= Falls Festival =

Australian music festival

The Falls Festival
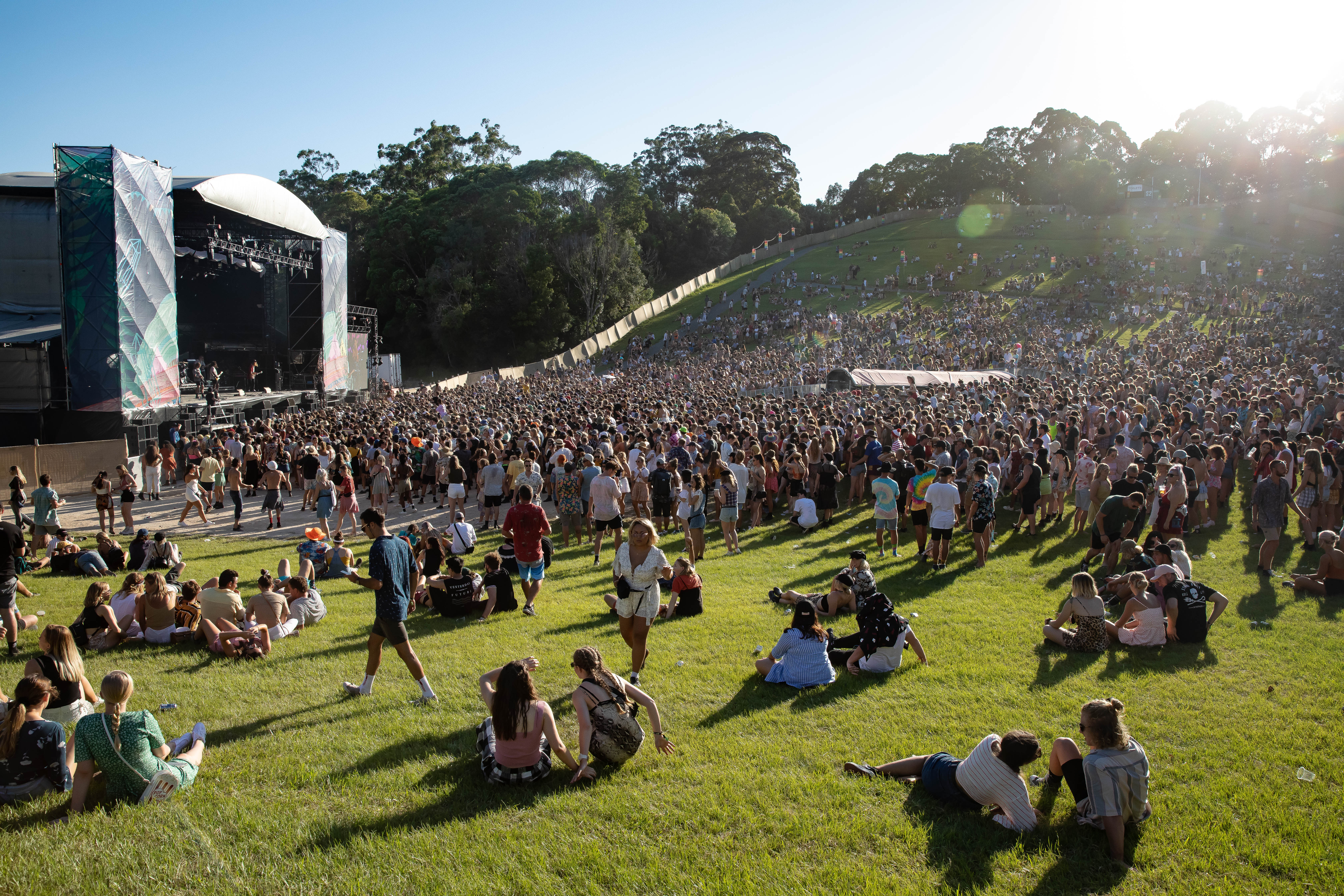
- Crowd at Falls Festival in 2018
- Genre: rock, indie, hip hop, electronic, blues & roots.
- Dates: Late December to early January
- Locations: Australia: Lorne, Victoria (1993–2019); Marion Bay, Tasmania (2003–2019); Byron Bay, New South Wales (2013–2023); Fremantle, Western Australia (2017–2023); Melbourne, Victoria (2022)
- Years active: 1993–2023
- Organiser: Secret Sounds
- Website: fallsfestival.com

Falls Festival, commonly known as , Falls Music & Arts Festival is an Australian music and arts festival whose events were traditionally held over the New Year period. It began in Lorne, Victoria in 1993 as Rock Above the Falls and later expanded to Marion Bay in Tasmania, Byron Bay in New South Wales and Fremantle in Western Australia. Its most recent events were held in Melbourne, Byron Bay and Fremantle during the 2022–23 summer. In May 2023, organisers announced that the festival would take time off to reconsider its future. By July 2026, it had not returned.

== History ==
Falls Festival began in Lorne, Victoria, in 1993 as Rock Above the Falls. The inaugural event attracted an unexpected crowd of about 11,000 people. The festival was extended to two days in 1995 and was renamed Falls Music & Arts Festival in 1996.

In 2003, the festival expanded to Marion Bay, Tasmania. In 2013, the festival expanded further to North Byron Parklands near Byron Bay, New South Wales. In January 2017, Falls Festival expanded to Western Australia with a sold-out two-day edition in central Fremantle.

After the festival commenced in December 2019, the remaining days of the Lorne edition were cancelled due to forecast extreme weather and bushfire risk. Falls Festival did not run during the 2020–21 or 2021–22 New Year periods because of COVID-19 restrictions.

In November 2021, Secret Sounds announced that the Marion Bay edition would not return after 17 years. The company’s co-chief executive, Jessica Ducrou, said the event had consistently lost money and no longer made financial sense.

The Victorian edition was held at the Sidney Myer Music Bowl in Melbourne from 29 to 31 December 2022. It had originally been planned for a site at Murroon, but an appeal against the approved planning permit delayed the process beyond the scheduled festival dates. Secret Sounds withdrew from the permit process in December 2022, citing the time and expense involved.

In May 2023, organisers announced that Falls Festival would take time off following its 2022–23 editions, saying the team needed a break and time to reconsider the festival’s future. By July 2026, the festival had not returned.

== Awards and nominations ==
At the 2009 FasterLouder Festival Awards, the Marion Bay edition of Falls Festival received the Favourite Venue & Location award.

In 2012, Falls Festival won the Qantas Award for Sustainable Tourism at the Victorian Tourism Awards. In 2013, the Marion Bay edition won the Major Festivals & Events category at the Tasmanian Tourism Awards, while the Lorne edition received the Qantas Award for Excellence in Sustainable Tourism at the Victorian Tourism Awards.

=== National Live Music Awards ===
The National Live Music Awards (NLMAs) are a broad recognition of Australia's diverse live industry, celebrating the success of the Australian live scene. The awards commenced in 2016.

Year	Nominee / work	Award	Result
National Live Music Awards of 2016	Falls Festival	Best Live Music Festival or Event	Nominated
National Live Music Awards of 2018	Falls Festival	Best Live Music Festival or Event	Nominated
National Live Music Awards of 2019	Falls Festival	Victorian Live Event of the Year	Won
National Live Music Awards of 2019	Falls Festival	Tasmanian All Ages Achievement	Won

== Lineups ==
=== 1996 ===
- Pennywise
- Radio Birdman
- Regurgitator
- Custard
- Powderfinger
- The Living End
- Even
- Dave Graney and the Coral Snakes
- Sidewinder
- Pollyanna
- Bodyjar
- Snout
- Moler
- Rebecca's Empire
- Meantime

=== 1997 ===
- Iggy Pop
- You Am I
- The Cruel Sea
- Hard Ons
- Lagwagon
- Superjesus
- Jebediah
- Shihad
- Grinspoon
- Guttermouth
- The Living End
- Even
- Something For Kate
- Deadstar
- Front End Loader
- Pre Shrunk
- Sprung Monkey

=== 1998 ===
- Blondie
- Mudhoney
- Bentley Rhythm Ace
- Rocket From The Crypt
- Unwritten Law
- Area-7
- The Avalanches
- Magic Dirt
- Moler
- You Am I
- Grinspoon
- Superjesus
- Nancy Vandal
- Ammonia
- Screamfeeder
- Even
- Bodyjar
- Something For Kate
- Frenzal Rhomb
- Violetine
- Voitek
- Honeysmack
- Pound System

=== 1999 ===
- Violent Femmes
- The Tea Party
- Freddy Fresh
- Regurgitator
- Something For Kate
- You Am I
- Frenzal Rhomb
- Superheist
- Killing Heidi
- DJ Boppa
- 28 Days
- Alex Lloyd
- Area-7
- Rhubarb
- Pollyanna
- The Fauves

=== 2000 ===
- Silverchair
- Reef
- The Vandals
- Freestylers
- Killing Heidi
- Superjesus
- The Avalanches
- Magic Dirt
- Bodyjar
- Groove Terminator
- John Butler Trio
- Skulker
- Pre Shrunk
- Sunk Loto
- 78 Saab
- Superheist
- Rocket Science
- Dallas Crane
- Nokturnl
- Nitocris
- The Waifs
- George
- Machine Gun Fellatio
- Resin Dogs
- Friendly (musician)
- Josh Abrahams
- 1200 Techniques
- Honeysmack
- Voitek

=== 2001 ===
- The Hives
- Stanton Warriors
- Grinspoon
- Regurgitator
- John Butler Trio
- Something For Kate
- 28 Days
- Resin Dogs
- Groove Terminator
- Alex Lloyd
- Paul Kelly
- Bodyjar
- Dr. Alex Paterson
- George
- Superheist
- Area-7
- One Dollar Short
- 1200 Techniques
- Dern Rutlidge
- Warped
- NuBreed
- On Inc
- Pound System
- Blueline Medic
- For Amusement Only

=== 2002 ===
- Jack Johnson
- The Black Eyed Peas
- Ozomatli
- Timo Maas
- The Vandals
- The Ataris
- Brad
- Grinspoon
- Machine Gun Fellatio
- Infusion
- Xavier Rudd
- 1200 Techniques
- The Casanovas
- You Am I
- Magic Dirt
- Jet
- Rocket Science
- The Drones
- Underside
- Antiskeptic
- The Gels
- The Butterfly Effect
- Groove Terminator
- Offcutts
- Warped
- Pete Murray
- Even
- Melatonin
- The Beautiful Girls
- The Sleepy Jackson
- Phil Smart
- Goodwill
- Samuel Jackson
- The Alias
- Ballpoint
- Three Rounds Shy (JJJ Unearthed)
- Ransom
- Quirk

=== 2003 ===
- Michael Franti and Spearhead
- Rollins Band
- Groove Armada
- Pennywise
- Reel Big Fish
- G. Love and Special Sauce
- Turin Brakes
- Ozomatli
- Mason Jennings
- Paul Kelly
- The Waifs
- Xavier Rudd
- Regurgitator
- The Beautiful Girls
- Cog
- The Mess Hall
- Trey
- Bodyjar
- Dallas Crane
- Dexter
- Bit By Bats
- Nubreed
- Krafty Kuts
- Cut Copy
- Missy Higgins
- TZU
- James De La Cruz
- Offcuts
- Danny Kelly and the Alpha Males
- The Butterfly Effect
- After The Fall
- Degrees K
- The Pictures
- Riff Random
- Ember Swift
- Bomba
- Gerling
- Harry Manx
- DJ's Kano & Ennio Styles
- Flagrant and Ben Shepard
- John Course and Goodwill
- Bugdust
- Epicure
- The Swedish Styles
- Carus
- Whalebone
- The Charlie Parkers
- Damon
- The Go Set
- The Double Agents
- Mick Hart
- SMC
- Unleash The Nugget
- Reflex
- Waiter
- Peter Cornelius and the Devilles
- The Fat Band
- Enola Fall
- Taiko Drum
- S. Jackson and Somantik
- Sharif Galal
- DJ Selekt and B Dub

=== 2004 ===
- The Black Keys
- De La Soul
- Billy Bragg
- The Living End
- The John Butler Trio
- Missy Higgins
- The Thrills
- Veruca Salt
- Spiderbait
- The Cat Empire
- Xavier Rudd
- Donavon Frankenreiter
- You Am I
- The Beautiful Girls
- Vusi Mahlasela
- Hilltop Hoods
- Rocket Science
- Dakota Star
- Bob Brozman
- Downsyde
- TZU
- The New Pollutants
- Butterfingers
- The Panics
- Hayden
- Sarah Blasko
- Even
- The Cops
- Betchadupa
- The Spazzys
- The Vasco Era
- Carus and The True Believers
- Epicure
- Mia Dyson
- Ash Grunwald
- The Hot Lies
- Clare Bowditch and the Feeding Set
- The Roys

=== 2005 ===
Artists who performed at the 2005 event included:

- The Dandy Warhols
- Ozomatli
- The Shins
- Ian Brown
- Wolfmother
- Pete Murray
- The Beautiful Girls
- The Vasco Era
- Faker
- TZU
- The Grates
- Hoodoo Gurus
- The Zutons
- Sarah Blasko
- End of Fashion
- The White Buffalo
- The Mess Hall
- Evermore
- Dallas Crane
- Lior
- Matt Walker and Ashley Davies
- 67 Special
- Ugly Duckling
- The Cat Empire
- Rolling Blackouts
- The Presets
- Eric Bibb
- Kelly Stoltz
- Little Birdy
- Ash Grunwald
- Dappled Cities Fly
- True Live
- Offcutts
- Katalyst and RuCL
- Rob Sawyer
- Mia Dyson
- Youth Group
- Dan Sultan & Scott Wilson
- The Embers

In 2005 tickets for the Marion Bay festival sold out two and a half days after going on sale on 15 August, and Lorne tickets selling out one week after coming on sale.

Further allocations of tickets for both festivals were released during December and sold out within hours of coming on sale. An unlimited number of Falls Festival patrons were able to attend the 'Falls Cinema' on Thursday 29 December (one day earlier than the official kick-off) in an effort to minimise traffic congestion. In Tasmania, the number of tickets available were capped at 9000.

=== 2006 ===
In early July, a new website for the 2006 event was launched. People were able to subscribe to the official mailing list and be entered into the draw to be offered tickets ahead of the official release date of 16 August. Subscribers that were selected were notified by 30 July. Tickets for the 2006 festival were put on sale as of 9 am, 16 August. All tickets to the Lorne event were gone in about 2 hours. The Marion Bay event followed suit, with all tickets sold out within 3.5 hours.

The announced performers as of 28 December, include:

- Modest Mouse
- Michael Franti and Spearhead
- Wolfmother
- Basement Jaxx
- The Bees
- John Butler Trio
- Saul Williams
- The Black Seeds
- Matt Costa
- The Vasco Era
- Dan Kelly and The Alpha Males
- The Fumes
- Dallas Frasca & Her Gentlemen
- You Am I
- The Audreys
- Youth Group
- Josh Pyke
- Blue King Brown
- Jamie Lidell
- Hilltop Hoods
- Eskimo Joe
- Unleash the Nugget
- Wolf & Cub
- Dexter
- Timmy Curran
- Labjacd
- Scribe
- The Sleepy Jackson
- The Mountain Goats
- Little Birdy
- The Exploders
- Jen Cloher and The Endless Sea
- Dan Sultan
- Cansei de Ser Sexy
- Ground Components
- FourPlay String Quartet
- Custom Kings
- Muph & Plutonic
- The Embers

Restrictions on ticket sales were made in 2006 (in the form of a ballot) in an attempt to curb the increasing practice of ticket resale, commonly known as 'scalping', as well as to make the access to tickets more equitable. The changes reflected similar alterations made to ticket sale procedures of other major Australian music festivals such as Splendour in the Grass and The Big Day Out. Previously, tickets had been released for sale in bulk and with no limit on the number of tickets able to be purchased by an individual, resulting in a high incidence of individuals purchasing multiple tickets, and a subsequent sell-out of tickets within 12 – 24 hours.

The restrictions included a purchasing limit of four tickets per any individual, as well as the initiation of an online ticket lottery, which randomly allocated the sale of approximately 50% of all tickets to a list of people who had registered their interest on the Festival's website. Tickets were also released on multiple dates rather than in bulk, to make sales more manageable and to increase consumer accessibility to the sale of tickets.

=== 2007 ===
The artists at the festival of 2007/08 included:

- Kings of Leon
- Groove Armada
- Paul Kelly
- Midnight Juggernauts
- Black Rebel Motorcycle Club
- The Waifs
- Gotye
- Built to Spill
- José González
- The Go! Team
- Blackalicious
- The Mess Hall
- Girl Talk
- Kev Carmody
- Whiskey Go Go's
- Neville Staple's Specials
- Adam Cousens**
- Bridget Pross**
- Magic Dirt*
- Sarah Blasko*
- Children Collide*
- Jackson Jackson*
- The Pipettes
- The Herd
- Lior
- Little Red
- Operator Please
- Old Man River
- Angus and Julia Stone
- The Beautiful Girls
- Regurgitator
- Clare Bowditch
- Downhills Home*
- Jeff Lang
- Cut Off Your Hands
- The Scientists of Modern Music
- Diafrix
- Mattafix
- Busdriver
- The Panics
- Dirty Harry and the Rockets**
- The Cops
- Nathan Weldon and the Two Timers**
- Special Patrol*
- Dukes of Windsor*
- Macromantics*
- The Paper Scissors*
- Dances With Voices*
- Goons of Doom*
- Whitley
- La Fiesta Sound System*
- Favela Rock DJs*
- Tokyo Apartment Party DJs*
- Thief Featuring DJ Gsan & Mugen with Paris Well*
- Jennifer Tutty & Katie Drover
- Hoops*
- Funktrust DJs*
- Uber Lingua DJs*
- New Young Pony Club*

(* Lorne Only), (** Marion Bay only)

Ticket purchasing procedures changed again in 2007, extending changes made to procedures in 2006. Changes included:

- the extension of the ticket lottery from 50% to 80% of all tickets – intended to increase the equity of ticket sale.
- the centralisation of all ticket sales to the Falls Festival Website – intended to eliminate the need to line up outside stores overnight to purchase a ticket, as well as prevent criminal problems associated with it such as littering and drinking in public.
- the inclusion of a name and date of birth printed on the Festival ticket – intended to further restrict scalping practices.

Tickets went on sale to the general public on Monday 10 September at 9 am AEST, with the 14,500 tickets to the Lorne event selling out on the day they were released.

=== 2008 ===
- Franz Ferdinand
- The Hives
- Santigold
- The Kooks
- Gomez
- Tegan and Sara
- Fleet Foxes
- Donavon Frankenreiter
- SoKo
- Jamie Lidell
- Cut Off Your Hands
- Mystery Jets
- Atmosphere feat. Brother Ali
- A-Trak
- Late of the Pier
- Sharon Jones & The Dap-Kings
- The Cat Empire
- The Grates
- Faker
- Lykke Li
- Augie March
- Blue King Brown
- Ash Grunwald
- TZU
- The Drones
- Architecture in Helsinki
- The Dodos
- Wolf & Cub
- Liam Finn
- Rocket Science
- Eli "Paperboy" Reed
- British India
- TinPan Orange
- Labjacd
- Violent Soho
- South Rakkas Crew
- Tame Impala
- The Holidays*
- Snob Scrilla*
- Grafton Primary
- Murs
- CW Stoneking & The Primitive Orchestra
- Laura Jean & The Eden Land Band
- Mamadou Diabate
- Kat Frankie
- Barons of Tang
- Dash & Will
- Skipping Girl Vinegar

Those marked with an asterisk (*) played in Lorne only.

=== 2009 ===
- Yeah Yeah Yeahs
- Moby
- Hilltop Hoods
- Grizzly Bear
- Rodrigo y Gabriela
- The Temper Trap
- Datarock
- The Dirty Love^
- Breakfast Balcony^
- Jamie T
- Amanda Blank*
- Dappled Cities*
- Wolfmother
- Xavier Rudd
- Emiliana Torrini
- Little Birdy
- Midnight Juggernauts
- Andrew Bird
- Lyrics Born
- Chairlift
- King Khan and the Shrines
- Editors
- Philadelphia Grand Jury
- Kaki King
- Sarah Blasko
- Art vs. Science
- DJ Yoda
- Liam Finn
- Lisa Mitchell
- Major Lazer Soundsystem (DJ Set)
- Patrick Watson
- Seasick Steve
- The View
- Urthboy
- White Rabbits
- Future of the Left
- Killaqueenz*
- Yves Klein Blue
- John Steel Singers
- Bertie Blackman*
- Washington*
- The Inspector Cluzo*
- Miami Horror*
- Wagons*
- Oh Mercy*
- Jordie Lane*
- Kid Sam*
- The Beards*
- Yacht Club DJs^
- Little Red
- The Phenomenal Handclap Band*
- Fully Fitted*
- The Vasco Era*
- Dan Sultan*
- Bag Raiders*
- Grrilla Step*
- Hoops DJ's*
- Whitley*
- Naysayer and Gilsun*
- Catcall*
- The Scare*
- Zac Cooper^
- The Paper Scissors*
- Andy Murphy & Chardy*
- Playing with Knives DJ's*

Funk'n'Soul Revue

- Marva Whitney & The Transatlantics*
- The Bamboos*
- Deep Street Soul*
- Mohair Slim
- DJ Kano*
- Emma Peel
- Anna's Go-Go Academy
- Russ Dewbury^
- Chris Gill
- Man Child

Those marked with an asterisk (*) played in Lorne only.
Those marked with a caret (^) played in Marion Bay only.

On 6 August 2009 some of the bands scheduled to play at the 2009 Falls Festival were leaked online due to a directory being left open on the official falls festival website. The organisers subsequently decided to officially release the entire first line-up announcement ahead of the scheduled 13 August release date.

On 7 October 2009 the Falls Festival announced that they would be putting on a pre-festival party, and extending the Falls Funk'n'Soul Revue to Lorne on 28 December. The extension of the revue made the Lorne festival a four-day event from 28 December to 1 January. The Funk'n'Soul Revue occurred over two days across the respective states, on the 28th in Lorne and on the 29th in Marion Bay with slightly differing lineups across the two locations.

=== 2010 ===
- Interpol
- MGMT
- Public Enemy (Performing their album Fear of a Black Planet in full)
- Joan Jett and the Black Hearts
- The Jezabels
- The National
- The Living End
- Dan Kelly (musician)
- Klaxons
- Angus & Julia Stone
- Tame Impala
- The Rapture
- Ladyhawke
- Cold War Kids
- Sleigh Bells
- Chris Baio (Vampire Weekend)
- Hot Hot Heat
- Paul Kelly
- Boy & Bear
- Children Collide
- The Beautiful Girls
- The John Butler Trio
- The Soft Pack
- Last Dinosaurs
- Dan Sultan*
- Sally Seltmann*
- The Cool Kids
- Junip
- Kitty, Daisy & Lewis
- Marina & The Diamonds*
- The Middle East
- Cloud Control
- Yacht Club DJs
- Washington
- The Public Opinion Afro Orchestra
- The Morning Benders
- The Bamboos
- Tijuana Cartel (band)
- A-Trak
- Edan The Dee-Jay*
- Ash Grunwald
- Beardyman
- The Cuban Brothers*
- World's End Press
- Casiokids
- Peaches
- Daara J Family
- Jamaica
- Charlie Parr
- Jonathan Boulet
- Big Scary
- Sampology
- Eagle and the Worm
- Jinja Safari
- Tim & Jean

=== 2011 ===
- Aloe Blacc
- Alpine
- An Horse
- Arctic Monkeys
- Arj Barker
- Babylon Circus
- Beirut
- CANT
- Crystal Castles
- CSS
- Dan Deacon
- DJ Yoda
- Easy Star All-Stars
- Emma Louise
- Fleet Foxes
- Grouplove
- J Mascis
- John Butler Trio
- Josh Pyke
- Josh Thomas
- Kimbra
- Lanie Lane
- Metronomy
- Missy Higgins
- Nouvelle Vague
- Papa vs Pretty
- PNAU
- Regurgitator (Playing Unit in full)
- The Scientists of Modern Music
- Scratch Perverts
- The Grates
- The Head and the Heart
- The Jezabels
- The Jim Jones Revue
- The Kooks
- The Naked & Famous
- Totally Enormous Extinct Dinosaurs (cancelled)
- Unknown Mortal Orchestra
- Young MC

Marion Bay Only

- The Dirty Love

Lorne Only

- 360
- Bass Kleph
- Dr Don Don
- Hook N Sling
- Lotek
- Mic Newman & Tornado Wallace
- Nina Las Vegas
- Oscar & Martin
- Strange Talk
- The Death Set
- Bleeding Knees Club
- The Bombay Royale
- Miles Kane
- Puta Madre Brothers
- Clairy Browne & The Bangin' Rackettes
- Boy in a Box
- Dub FX
- Guineafowl
- Gyuto Monks of Tibet
- Kim Churchill
- Lewis Floyd Henry

=== 2012 ===
- Angus Stone
- Ash Grunwald
- Ball Park Music
- Beach House
- Best Coast
- Bombay Bicycle Club
- Boy & Bear
- Coolio
- Cosmo Jarvis
- Django Django
- First Aid Kit
- Hilltop Hoods
- Hot Chip
- Jinja Safari
- Lisa Mitchell
- Lyke Giants
- Matt Corby
- Maxïmo Park
- Millions
- Sampology Presents a Falls Anniversary Live AV Show
- SBTRKT
- Sharon Van Etten
- The Flaming Lips
- The Hives
- The Vaccines
- Totally Enormous Extinct Dinosaurs
- Two Door Cinema Club
- Willis Earl Beal

Lorne Only

- Airwolf
- Ajax
- Alison Wonderland
- Bleeding Knees Club
- Cactus Channel
- Cassian
- Cub Scouts (Cub Sport)
- Daniel Champagne
- DZ Deathrays
- Elizabeth Rose
- Flume
- Fraser A. Gorman
- Grey Ghost
- Howlin' Steam Train
- Husky
- Indian Summer
- Jen Tutty & Katie Drover
- King Gizzard & the Lizard Wizard
- Miami Horror DJs
- Parachute Youth
- Peking Duk
- Regular John
- The Rechords
- The Trouble With Templeton
- Tinpan Orange
- Soccer Mum DJs
- World's End Press

=== 2013 ===
- !!!
- Asta
- Bombino
- Bonobo
- The Cat Empire
- Chet Faker
- Crystal Fighters
- Cyril Hahn
- Emma Louise
- Flight Facilities
- Gossling
- Grizzly Bear
- Hanni El Khatib
- Hermitude
- Horrorshow
- James Vincent McMorrow
- The John Steel Singers
- Johnny Marr
- London Grammar
- MGMT
- Neil Finn
- Oliver Tank
- The Paper Kites
- POND
- The Preatures
- The Roots
- The Rubens
- Rufus
- Solange
- Thundamentals
- Tom Odell
- Vampire Weekend
- Violent Femmes
- Violent Soho
- The War on Drugs
- White Denim
- The Wombats

=== 2014 ===
- Airling^
- Moses Gunn Collective^
- KLP (musician)^*
- Japanese Wallpaper*
- Benson*
- Just A Gent*
- Charlotte OC*
- Grmm*
- Horns of Leroy*
- Kilter*
- Henry Stone (Comedian)*
- Melbourne Gospel Choir*
- Pierce Brothers*
- Torren Foot*
- UV Boi *
- Yahtzel (DJ Set)*

Joining

- alt-J
- Art of Sleeping^*
- Ásgeir
- Big Freedia
- The Black Lips
- Bluejuice
- Charlotte OC*
- Cloud Control*^
- Cold War Kids
- Dan Sultan
- DMA's
- Fishing*^
- Glass Animals
- George Ezra
- Jagwar Ma
- Jamie xx
- Joey Bada$$
- John Butler Trio
- Julian Casablancas + The Voidz
- Kim Churchill
- Kingswood *^
- The Kite String Tangle
- Megan Washington *^
- Milky Chance
- Movement
- Northeast Party House *^
- The Presets
- Remi
- Röyksopp & Robyn
- Run The Jewels
- Safia
- SBTRKT (LIVE)
- Spiderbait
- Sticky Fingers
- Thelma Plum *^
- The Temper Trap
- Tensnake
- Tkay Maidza
- Todd Terje (LIVE)
- Tycho
- Vance Joy
- Wolf Alice

Those marked with a * played in Lorne only
Those marked with a ^ played in Byron Bay only

=== 2015 ===
In 2015 the events Lorne, Victoria venue was threatened by bushfires in the area and moved to Mount Duneed Estate, which is approximately 15 minutes from Geelong.

- Alpine
- The Strokes
- Art vs Science
- The Avener (FRA)
- Birds of Tokyo
- Bloc Party (UK)
- BØRNS (USA)
- Courtney Barnett
- Disclosure (UK)
- Django Django (UK)
- El Vez (USA)
- Fleetmac Wood
- Foals (UK)
- Gang of Youths
- Gary Clark Jr. (USA)
- Halsey (USA)
- Hiatus Kaiyote
- Hilltop Hoods
- King Gizzard & the Lizard Wizard
- Kurt Vile and The Violators (USA)
- Little May
- The Maccabees (UK)
- Mac DeMarco (CAN)
- Meg Mac
- Oh Wonder (UK)
- Paul Kelly & Merri Soul Sessions ft. Clairy Browne, Dan Sultan, Kira Piru, Vika & Linda Bull
- Rüfüs
- Seth Sentry
- Toro y Moi (USA)
- Weird Al Yankovic (USA)
- Young Fathers (UK)

+ more to be announced

=== 2016 ===
- Childish Gambino (USA)
- London Grammar (UK)
- The Avalanches
- Violent Soho
- Matt Corby
- Alison Wonderland
- Catfish and the Bottlemen (UK)
- Fat Freddy's Drop (NZ)
- Ta-Ku
- The Rubens
- The Jezabels
- Ball Park Music
- ~~Grouplove (USA)~~
- Bernard Fanning
- Jamie T (UK)
- Broods (NZ)
- Tkay Maidza
- Grandmaster Flash (USA)
- Illy
- Golden Features
- Hot Dub Time Machine
- DMA's
- AlunaGeorge (UK)
- Booka Shade (GER)
- Client Liaison
- Vallis Alps
- Parquet Courts (USA)
- City Calm Down
- L D R U
- Modern Baseball (USA)
- Tired Lion
- Remi
- Ry X
- Marlon Williams (NZ)
- Lemaitre (NOR)
- Shura (UK)
- Grouplove cancelled their appearance at Falls Festival due to singer Hannah Hooper suffering from vocal problems

=== 2017 ===
- Flume
- Fleet Foxes (US)
- The Kooks (UK)
- Glass Animals (UK)
- Peking Duk
- Angus and Julia Stone
- Foster The People (US)
- Liam Gallagher (UK)
- Vince Staples (US)
- Jungle (UK)
- Dune Rats
- The Smith Street Band
- DRAM (US)
- Daryl Braithwaite
- Everything Everything (UK)
- Allday
- The Jungle Giants
- Thundamentals
- Methyl Ethel
- Slumberjack
- D.D Dumbo
- Anna Lunoe
- DZ Deathrays
- Confidence Man
- Julia Jacklin
- Bad//Dreems
- Cosmo's Midnight
- Winston Surfshirt
- Luca Brasi
- Alex Lahey
- Camp Cope
- Flint Eastwood (US)
- Ecca Vandal
- Dave (UK)
- Total Giovanni

=== 2018 ===
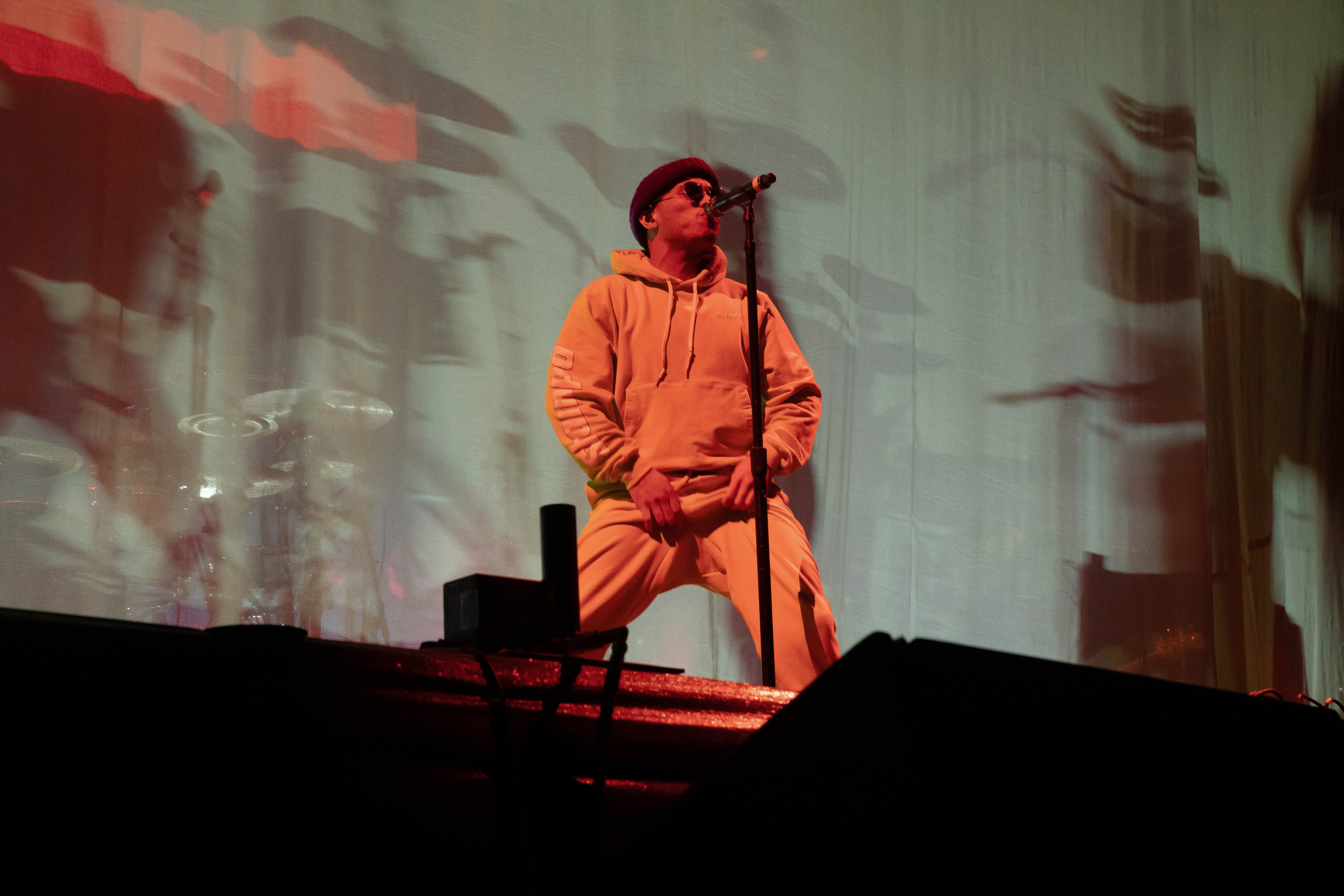
Anderson .Paak performing at Falls Festival in 2018.

- Anderson Paak & The Free Nationals (USA)
- Catfish and the Bottlemen (UK)
- Vance Joy
- Chvrches (UK)
- Hilltop Hoods
- Juice Wrld (USA)
- Interpol (USA)
- Toto (USA)
- Dizzee Rascal (UK)
- 88 Rising ft. Rich Brian, Joji, Niki, & 8 August (USA/IDN/JPN)
- Flight Facilities
- Amy Shark
- DMA's
- King Gizzard & the Lizard Wizard
- Golden Features
- First Aid Kid (SWE)
- Ocean Alley
- Hockey Dad
- Cashmere Cat (NOR)
- The Vaccines (UK)
- LPX (USA)
- Cub Sport
- Ruel
- Jack River
- Bishop Briggs (UK)
- Mallrat
- Briggs
- Touch Sensitive
- Tkay Maidza
- Dermot Kennedy (IRL)
- Tired Lion
- Hobo Johnson & The LoveMakers (USA)
- Soccer Mommy (USA)
- Running Touch
- Odette
- Kinder
- Mahalia (UK)
- Hatchie
- West Thebarton
- Tia Gostelow
- Kota Banks
- Triple One
- Alice Skye
- Sweater Curse
- Lex Deluxe

=== 2019 ===
- Halsey (USA)
- Vampire Weekend (USA)
- Disclosure (UK)
- Peking Duk
- Playboi Carti (USA)
- Of Monsters and Men (ISL)
- Pnau
- Lewis Capaldi (UK)
- Milky Chance (GER)
- John Farnham
- Banks (USA)
- Dope Lemon
- Vera Blue
- Yungblud (UK)
- G Flip
- Crooked Colours
- Parcels
- Thelma Plum
- #1 Dads
- Waax
- Baker Boy
- Psychedelic Porn Crumpets
- Amyl and the Sniffers
- The Japanese House (UK)
- Pink Sweats (USA)
- Good Dooogs
- Cxloe
- James Gillow
- Totty

=== 2023 ===
- Arctic Monkeys (UK)
- Lil Nas X (USA)
- Peggy Gou (KOR/GER)
- Chvrches (UK)
- Jamie xx (UK)
- Aminé (USA)
- Ocean Alley
- CamelPhat (UK)
- Spacey Jane
- DMA's
- G Flip
- PinkPantheress (UK)
- Rico Nasty (USA)
- Amyl and the Sniffers
- Mall Grab
- Ben Böhmer (GER)
- DJ Seinfeld (SWE/GER)
- Genesis Owusu
- TSHA (UK)
- CC:Disco
- Young Franco
- Anna Lunoe
- Luude
- Lastlings
- MAY-A
- Choomba
- The VANNS
- King Stingray
- Peach PRC
- Beddy Rays
- ~~Jean Dawson (USA)~~
- Telenova
- Biscits (UK)
- Barry Can't Swim (UK)
- Elkka (UK)
- Floodlights
- Wongo
- YNG Martyr
- 1300
- Moktar
- Magdalena Bay (USA)
- Dameeeela
- Ebony Boadu
- RONA.
- Elsy Wameyo
- Juno Mamba
- The Wiggles

== See also ==
- List of events in Tasmania
