= Thylacine (disambiguation) =

Thylacine may refer to:

- Thylacine, largest known carnivorous marsupial of modern times commonly known as the Tasmanian tiger
- Thylacine (band), Australian alternative band
- Thylacine Darner, or scientifically Acanthaeschna victoria, species of dragonfly in family Aeshnidae and endemic to Australia
- Thylacine (album), album by Monique Brumby
- Thylacine, African-French musicien and composer
