= MS Fest =

Former Australian music festival

- Logo of MS Fest 2008
- Genre: Rock, Hip hop, Electronic
- Dates: February - March
- Locations: Launceston, Australia (2006 -2011); Hobart, Australia (2012 - cancelled)
- Years active: 2006 - 2011
- Founders: MS Society
- Website: Official website

MS Fest was a music festival, held annually in Launceston, Tasmania Australia since 2006 until 2011 when the MS Society unsuccessfully attempted to establish a new event under the brand. Hobart, Tasmania. It was a single day event, held in February or March on a Saturday.

Silverchair playing at MS Fest 2007

The festival started in 2006 with a concert at Launceston's Regatta Ground to mark the 50th anniversary of the MS Society. The event sold out, and quickly became known as one of Tasmania's premier music events.

In 2007 the event operation and funding was taken over by Launceston-based events company Opcon and relocated to Inveresk Showground to accommodate a larger crowd. There was a main stage, featuring mostly rock and hip hop, and a secondary stage, the Ministry of Sound arena, which featured DJ and electronic music throughout the day.

In 2010, the festival returned to Inveresk Showground and sold over 13,000 tickets, the largest number of ticket sales to date.

Over the years of operation Opcon attempted to negotiate an arrangement with the MS Society of Tasmania that would be sustainable and respectful of the huge financial risk the company was undertaking to deliver the event. In 2011 the MS Society of Tasmania announced that instead of negotiating a sustainable position with Opcon they would take the MS Fest brand and operate a new event, relocating to the Hobart TCA Grounds at Hobart for the 2012 show. The MS Society and its new operator commented "The commercial environment in Launceston for the event changed and MS Fest’s future became unsound. This and the opportunity to host the event at such an iconic and pristine venue such as the TCA grounds in Hobart made this the clear and sensible choice for MS Tasmania. We look forward to people making a weekend of it and travelling down for a great show." However, mere days before it was scheduled to begin, the 2012 festival was cancelled due to lack of ticket sales and the overwhelming success of Opcons rebranded festival, Breath of Life continuing in Launceston. The MS Society of Tasmania accrued huge loses with the failed 2012 event effectively losing all the funds which have been delivered to the charity over the successful years of operation by Opcon. As of now nowhere is no immediate future for the MS Fest at this point, but organisers hope to resurrect it in the not-too-distant future.

== Line-Ups by Year ==
=== MS Fest 2006 ===
The 2006 festival was the first installment of MS Fest, held on Saturday, 11 March 2006 at the Royal Park Regatta Grounds, Launceston. The line-up of artists included:

- Grinspoon
- Shihad
- Rogue Traders
- The Herd
- Cog
- Bliss n Eso
- Behind Crimson Eyes
- Fast Crew
- Nubreed
- True Live
- DurbeyField
- Stand Defiant
- The Dead Abigails
- The Embers
- The Ten Bears
- Goodwill
- Poxy Music
- John Course
- Ajax

=== MS Fest 2007 ===
The 2007 event saw Silverchair's first Tasmanian performance in 7 years. The event was staged at Inveresk Showgrounds, Launceston, on Saturday, 10 March 2007. It featured a main stage and a Ministry of Sound arena, which featured DJs and electronic acts throughout the day. The event was emceed by Jabba. Artists who performed at the 2007 event include:

- Silverchair
- Pete Murray
- Butterfingers
- Spiderbait
- The Beautiful Girls
- Karnivool
- True Live
- The Scientists of Modern Music
- Trial Kennedy
- Mammal
- Bobby Flynn
- Modus
- This Future Chaos
- Cruel Like That
- Kid Kenobi & MC Shureshock
- Ajax
- Recut
- Little Cam
- Gillie
- Smithmonger
- Mind Electric
- The Stafford Brothers & Timmy Trumpet
- Klaus Hill
- Goodwill

=== MS Fest 2008 ===
The 2008 installment took place on Saturday, 16 February 2008. The 2008 event was the biggest so far, with over 11,000 in attendance. The artists who performed are:

- Hilltop Hoods
- Sneaky Sound System
- Little Birdy
- Kisschasy
- Cog
- The Presets
- Bliss n Eso
- Mark Dynamix
- Parkway Drive
- Behind Crimson Eyes
- Kid Kenobi & MC Shureshock
- TZU
- The Getaway Plan
- Timbre Terrorists
- The Embers
- Shock Corridor
- Your Damn Neighbours
- Goodwill
- Hook N Sling
- Sam La More
- Klaus Hill
- Phil K
- Dexter

=== MS Fest 2009 ===
- The Living End
- The Presets
- Faker
- Cog
- Gyroscope
- Josh Pyke
- Dukes of Windsor
- The Potbelleez
- The Scientists of Modern Music
- Carpathian
- Drapht
- Funkoars
- Paris Wells
- The Stafford Brothers
- Kid Kenobi & MC Shureshock
- Goodwill
- Hook N Sling
- The Aston Shuffle

=== MS Fest 2010 ===
The first installment of the line-up was announced on 15 September 2009.

- Parkway Drive
- Eskimo Joe
- Outkast
- Evermore
- Bliss N Eso
- Karnivool
- Kisschasy
- Black Japan
- The Sundance Kids
- Kate Miller-Heidke
- Silversun Pickups
- Sneaky Sound System
- The Potbelleez
- Dash & Will
- Funkoars
- Regular John
- Jessica Mauboy
- Miami Horror
- Sam La More
- Goodwill
- Hook N Sling
- The Aston Shuffle
- Tommy Trash
- Bass Kleph
- Short Stack

=== MS Fest 2011 ===
- The Presets
- Art vs. Science
- Lisa Mitchell
- Gotye
- Bag Raiders
- The Black Seeds
- Birds of Tokyo
- Yolanda Be Cool
- The Potbelleez
- Drapht
- Gyroscope
- Ash Grunwald
- Lowrider
- Dead Letter Circus
- British India
- The Aston Shuffle
- Urthboy
- Amy Meredith
- Horrorshow
- The Only
- Stafford Brothers
- Minx
- Jinja Safari
- Goodwill
- Tom Piper
- Anna Lunoe
- Architecture in Helsinki

=== MS Fest 2012 ===
Line-up announced via the festival's Facebook page on Friday 18 November 2011. The festival was cancelled in early 2012 due to low ticket sales and poor weather predictions. As of now, there is no immediate future for the MS Fest, but hopefully, it will be resurrected in the near future.

- Sparkadia
- The Naked and Famous
- Bomb the Bass
- Muscles
- Little Red
- Bluejuice
- Grafton Primary
- Amy Meredith
- Unkle Sounds
- San Cisco
- Matt Corby
- EVIL EDDIE
- Nina Las Vegas
- Sampology
- Acumen!
- Kuya
- Ajax
- Tijuana Cartel
- Salmonella Dub Sound System
- Fat Freddy's Drop

== See also ==
- List of events in Tasmania
