= Southern Roots Festival =

Annual music festival in Australia

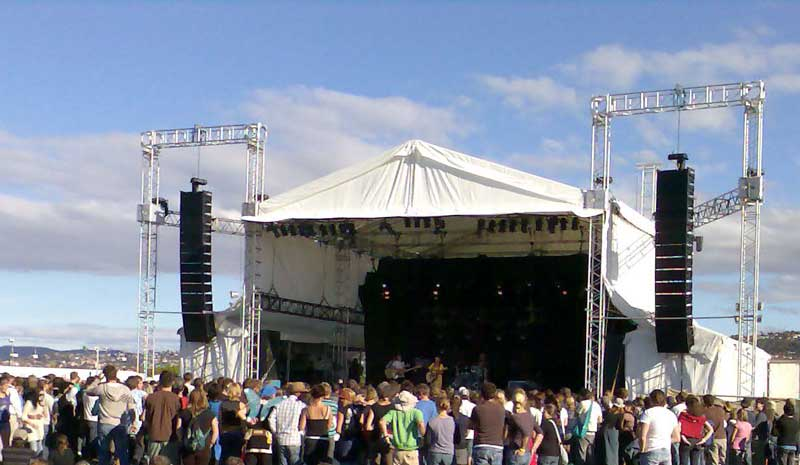
- Southern Roots main stage (2007)
- Genre: Rock, Hip hop, Electronic
- Dates: Easter
- Location: (Australia) Hobart
- Years active: 2007 – 2008
- Founders: Charles Touber
- Website: web.archive.org/web/20080420132310/http://www.southernroots.com.au/

Southern Roots was an annual music festival in Australia, held in Hobart, Tasmania. Similar to the Big Day Out, it is common that the well-known headlining acts will play on the outdoor "Main Stage" which overlooks the venue, and the lesser known (and often local) acts will perform on the indoor "Pavilion Stage". The stages are within a short walking distance of each another.

Other areas at the festival include: amusement rides, food and merchandise shopping areas, and one or more designated alcohol consumption areas to which access is restricted to those of the local drinking age.

== 2007 ==
The 2007 festival was held on 7 April 2007 (the Easter weekend) at the Royal Hobart Showgrounds in Glenorchy and featured the following line-up:

International acts: Pixies, Gomez, The Lemonheads, Iain Archer and Ben Kweller.

Australian acts: Wolfmother, The Vines, Xavier Rudd, Toni Collette & the Finish, Midnight Juggernauts, Dili Allstars, The Scientists of Modern Music, The Devil Rock 4, The Embers, Red Rival, Angus and Julia Stone and Pnau.

TnT (Tim Rogers and Tex Perkins) were also originally listed as attending the event but pulled out for unknown reasons.

Charles Touber, the event co-promoter, stated that with the 2007 event attracting between 8,000 and 10,000 people that the Festival would become an annual event. The showgrounds is an ideal location to host the event with buildings and good facilities, Touber praised the Royal Agricultural Society of Tasmania, saying they had bent over backwards to ensure the festival's success.

== 2008 ==
The 2008 festival was held at the Royal Tasmanian Botanical Gardens. The scheduled line-up was:

International acts: John Fogerty, Michelle Shocked, Patty Griffin.

Australian acts: Keith Urban, Music Maker Foundation, Amali Ward, Angus and Julia Stone, Bridget Pross, Unleash the Nugget, Pete Cornelius and the Devilles.

== 2009 ==
The 2009 festival was scheduled to be held in the town of Richmond, however the organisers cancelled the 2009 event, saying that the decline of the Australian dollar against the U.S. dollar made it difficult to book big-name international acts. Jock Campbell, the mayor of Clarence said the cancellation was a blow to the town, and he hoped that Southern Roots would return in 2010.

== See also ==
- List of events in Tasmania
