= Gone South =

Former music festival held in Tasmania, Australia

- Genre: Rock, Hip hop, Electronic
- Dates: various
- Location: (Australia) Tasmania
- Years active: 1999 – 2003
- Website: Official Website

Gone South was a music festival in Tasmania, Australia. It has been held in both Launceston and Hobart at various times. It has been promoted by local Hobart businessman Charles Touber, and more recently in conjunction with Karen Henderson.

The location of festivals in the state has always been a difficult problem, as unlike other states, Tasmania's population is evenly distributed inside and outside the capital city, and as a result there is huge rivalry between the north (Launceston) and south (Hobart) of the state. Hobart residents tend to be less keen to travel to a festival, whereas people from Launceston are used to events being in Hobart only, and therefore are not as averse to travelling.

The promoters have stated that Launceston is the best site for the festival as it is geographically the most centrally accessible city in Tasmania, located less than two hours' drive from Hobart, the north-west, and the east coast. The 2002 event that featured Incubus was held at Hobart due to State government sponsorship for that event. No plans for future events have currently been announced.

== 1999 Launceston ==
The first event was held in December 1999 at the Inveresk Railyards in Launceston. The line-up included Grinspoon, Paul Kelly, Killing Heidi, Silverchair, Powderfinger and Alex Lloyd. Touber greatly underestimated the popularity of the event, with huge queues for food, water and toilets most of the day. Despite this, the event proved extremely popular and drew crowds of 12,000 people - Launceston's population was 90,000 at the time.

== 2002 Hobart ==
The second was held at the TCA Ground at the Domain in Hobart in March 2002 under sponsorship from the state government. Featuring the American band Incubus and the Australian bands; Machine Gun Fellatio, Sonic Animation, Grinspoon, Killing Heidi and numerous Tasmanian bands. Despite bad weather and the late cancellation of a headlining act (Silverchair), the second festival drew crowds of over 13,000 people.

== 2002 Launceston ==
The third Gone South was in Launceston in November 2002. There were a few unusual changes that made this event less popular. First of all, country singer Kasey Chambers was one of the acts, which was very out of alignment with the other acts - Grinspoon, Alex Lloyd, Sonic Animation, Superheist, Motor Ace, You Am I and Pacifier. Second, it was only eight months since the previous concert. Third, it was in November, which was during exams for many school and University students. Amid threats to cancel the event due to poor ticket sales, the event went ahead, although a much smaller crowd than usual at 9000.

== 2003 Launceston ==
The fourth and most recent event was again in Launceston in December 2003. Scheduled for the weekend before Christmas, plans were looking great, with popular bands Powderfinger, John Butler Trio, The Living End, 1200 Techniques, and The Butterfly Effect on the line-up, as well as classic Australian band The Church. However, it happened that another festival, the Falls Festival, was announced at Marion Bay for New Year's Eve - less than two weeks later. The Falls Festival had a much bigger and wide-ranging line-up, as well as being in the south of the state. Sales for Gone South tickets were again very slow, and the event finally went ahead with as few as 7000 tickets sold. By comparison, the Falls Festival for that year sold around 10,000 tickets.

== See also ==
- List of events in Tasmania
