= The Embers (band) =

Australian band

- 2007 line-up (L-R): Michael Attard, Mark Vincent, Leonardo Martinez, Katy Humphries, Joel Delphin, Stu van Riel.

Background information
- Origin: Launceston, Tasmania, Australia
- Genres: Jazz fusion; roots; Latin; folk; rock; groove
- Years active: 2005–2008; 2011–present
- Members: Michael Attard; Katy Humphries; Miles Bender; Jai Larkman; Kilty Salter
- Past members: Joel Delphin; Leonardo Martinez; Stu van Riel; Mark Vincent; Michael Woods
- Website: facebook.com/embermembers

The Embers are an Australian roots-fusion band formed in Launceston in late 2005 by mainstays Michael Attard on acoustic guitar, lead vocals and harmonica; and Katy Humphries on saxophone, violin and backing vocals. They perform classical, jazz, folk, country and traditional Mexican music. They disbanded in 2008 and reformed in 2011, they released their debut studio album, Bright, in March 2015.

== History ==
The Embers were formed by friends late in 2005 and aimed to compete in the National Campus Band Competition (NCBC). Duncan Ewington of Sauce Magazine caught their performance at the Art School Ball of the University of Tasmania in Hobart in December; he described how, "The Embers were tight and original – I loved the panpipes and the charango guitar, violin and stand-up-bass – what a combo." They supported artists, the Violent Femmes, the Whitlams, Marcia Hines, the Red Eyes, True Live and the Exploders.

The Embers played the MS Fest and Falls Festival during 2006. In October of that year they travelled to Sydney for the NCBC. They won the national title against fellow state winners: Regicide (New South Wales), the Strange Little Girls (Queensland), Cellar Door (Victoria), Kingswood Country (Australian Capital Territory), Avedis (South Australia) and the Dee Dee Dums (Western Australia). The prize provided "$8,000 worth of band equipment... plus 3 days studio time and 3,000 mastered and duplicated CDs." Previous entrants include the Vines, Eskimo Joe, george and the Vasco Era.

In January 2007 they played at the Cygnet Folk Festival. They also performed at the inaugural International Southern Roots Festival in Hobart in that April. Also in April, the Embers used their prize from the NCBC to finish recording their debut self-titled extended play at Woodstock Studios in Melbourne, which was issued in August. By May 2007 the line-up was Michael Attard on acoustic guitar and lead vocals, Joel Delphin on drums, Katy Humphries on saxophone and violin, Leonardo Martinez on Pan flute, Andean flute, charango, Stu van Riel on bass guitar and double bass, and Mark Vincent on electric guitar.

After an appearance at the Falls Festival in 2008 the group disbanded. Subsequently Martinez returned to his native Mexico to work "in aquaculture research", van Riel became a nurse, and Vincent joined the air force. Attard and Humphries continued their music careers, working with the Launceston musicians.

The pair reformed the Embers in 2011 with temporary members including Norman Abdullah, Michael Woods, Carl Burlow and Luke Young. By April 2012 the line-up was Attard and Humphries joined by Miles Bender on keyboards and backing vocals; Kilty Salter on bass guitar and backing vocals; and Jai Larkman on drums, percussion and backing vocals. Attard described their use of several genres to Stephanie Eslake of Warp Magazine in December 2014, "At first I was into blues, but by the end things got more contemporary... We do it because people like all different styles of music – and not a lot of bands do all different styles." The group successfully applied for a grant from Arts Tasmania.

The band's debut album, Bright, was released in March 2015. It was recorded with Nicky Bomba producing at his Freeburgh Station studios, near the Victoria rural town of Bright; he also provided steel drum on a track. Girl.com.au's reviewer found, "[it] seamlessly melds elements of reggae, blues, rock and funk to create a long-player that is jam-packed with catchy songwriting, deft instrumentation and an almost tangible live sensibility." In August 2015 they started an east coast tour in support of the album's release. In August 2018 they performed at WilderFeast on Flinders Island, Tasmania.

2018- Now

The Embers continued to play various shows across the state including many at its 'Home Base' of the Royal Oak Hotel in Launceston, Junction Arts Festival, Festivale, The Taste Hobart, Beerfest Launceston, Fresh Hops St John, RAM in Bicheno, EchoFest, Party in the Paddock and other Flinders Island shows. From 2019 they embarked on a recording of established material with producer Lawrence Maddy for an EP release. Due to the confounding elements of 'the lost Covid years' and a nasty accident sustained by Katy to her bowing arm, release has only just come to fruition. The Embers are excited to launch the 5 track 'Eats Itself' EP at Altar in Hobart on 25th March.

== Band members ==
- Michael Attard – acoustic guitar, lead vocals, harmonica
- Joel Delphin – drums, percussion, vocals
- Katy Humphries – saxophone, violin, backing vocals
- Leonardo Martinez – Pan flute, Andean flute, charango, vocals
- Stu van Riel – bass guitar, double bass
- Mark Vincent – electric guitar
- Michael Woods – trumpet
- Miles Bender – keyboards, backing vocals
- Kilty Salter – bass guitar, backing vocals
- Jai Larkman – drums, percussion, backing vocals

== Discography ==
=== Albums ===
- Bright (March 2015)

=== Extended plays ===
- The Embers (August 2007)
- Eats Itself (March 2023)

=== Singles ===
- Mission (November 2014)
- Say I (October 2016)
