= Royal Launceston Show =

Annual agricultural event in Tasmania

- Also called: 'The Show'
- Observed by: Northern Tasmania
- Type: Northern public holiday
- Significance: Royal National Agricultural and Pastoral Society of Tasmania Limited
- Celebrations: Agricultural displays, sideshows, fashion parades
- Date: 09–12 October 2025
- Duration: 3 days
- Frequency: annual

The Royal Launceston Show is an annual event held in Carrick in October and is hosted by the Royal National Agricultural and Pastoral Society of Tasmania (RNAPS), established in 1873. The show marks a public holiday that is observed in Northern Tasmania only.

The Royal Launceston Show is principally an agricultural event which focuses on the primary industries of Tasmania, and rural lifestyle of many Tasmanians with events such as livestock judging, equestrian events, animal breeders competitions, produce competitions and wood chopping, although it also incorporates live entertainment, sporting events and more. A popular feature of the show is the sideshow area featuring showrides, foodstalls, games of skill, and showbag stalls.

Like its southern counterpart, the Royal Hobart Show, the event has recently shifted towards a carnival atmosphere than its previously more agrarian focus. From 2018, the show became a one day event on Thursday 11 October, a public holiday in the north of the state, known as Show Day.

In 2020 & 2021, the Show, due on 21 to 24 October, was cancelled due to restrictions related to the COVID-19 pandemic. Other cancellations happened from 1915 to 1918 & 1940 to 1944 (times of war).

In 2022 the show was relocated from Launceston to Carrick.

In 2024 the show was suspended and the event has not gone ahead in the following years of 2025 and 2026. The Public Holiday remains.

== See also ==
- List of events in Tasmania
