= List of events in Tasmania =

List of notable annual events and festivals in Tasmania, Australia

A range of events occur in Tasmania, from well-known sporting fixtures such as the Sydney to Hobart Yacht Race, Hobart International, and Royal Hobart Regatta, to major arts, cultural, and food festivals such as Dark Mofo, Taste of Summer, Agfest, and 10 Days on the Island. This is a list of those that are notable.

A wide range of events occur in Tasmania, including major standalone sporting fixtures such as the Sydney to Hobart Yacht Race, Hobart International, and Royal Hobart Regatta, as well as major arts, cultural, and food festivals such as Dark Mofo, Taste of Summer, Agfest, and 10 Days on the Island.

Tasmania also hosts recurring seasonal national sports fixtures, including Australian Football League (AFL) matches at Ninja Stadium and UTAS Stadium, Hobart Hurricanes home games in the Big Bash League and domestic cricket matches, and NBL home games featuring the Tasmania JackJumpers. This list focuses primarily on annual and recurring standalone events and festivals.

== List of annual and recurring events in Tasmania ==
Event	Type	Description	Month	Cadence
Cadbury Marathon	Sports & Recreation	Cadbury's Claremont instigated the inaugural Cadbury Marathon in 1983. Covering a distance over 42 kilometres (26 mi), the long-distance event begins and terminates at the factory. The event celebrated its 40th year in 2023.	Jan	Annual
Cygnet Folk Festival	Music & Festivals	Folk music and arts festival in Cygnet, Southern Tasmania.	Jan	Annual
Hobart Cup	Sports & Recreation	Premier thoroughbred horse racing event held at Elwick Racecourse.	Jan–Feb	Annual
Hobart International	Sports & Recreation	WTA Tour professional women's tennis tournament held at the Hobart International Tennis Centre.	Jan	Annual
Australian Wooden Boat Festival	Arts & Culture / Maritime	Maritime festival celebrating wooden boats, held at Sullivans Cove, Hobart.	Feb	Biennial
Launceston Cup	Sports & Recreation	Thoroughbred horse racing fixture held at Mowbray Racecourse.	Feb	Annual
Mystic Journey Stakes	Sports & Recreation	Group 3 thoroughbred horse race for mares held at Mowbray Racecourse during the Launceston Cup carnival.	Feb	Annual
National Penny Farthing Championships	Sports & Recreation	Running since 1983 in Evandale, the National Penny Farthing Championships is the largest event in the world dedicated to penny-farthing racing.	Feb	Annual
Party in the Paddock	Music & Festivals	Major multi-day music and arts festival held at Quercus Park in Carrick.	Feb	Annual
Rosebery Festival	Arts & Culture	Long-running community arts, music, live performance, and cultural festival in Rosebery.	Feb	Annual
Royal Hobart Regatta	Sports & Recreation	Three-day aquatic carnival and public holiday weekend on the River Derwent.	Feb	Annual
Burnie International	Sports & Recreation	A professional tennis tournament played on outdoor hardcourts. It is currently part of the ATP Challenger Tour and the ITF Women's Circuit.	Feb–Mar	Annual
10 Days on the Island	Arts & Culture	Statewide multi-artform cultural festival.	Mar	Biennial
A Taste of the Huon	Food & Agriculture	One of Southern Tasmania’s longest running outdoor festivals held over two days in the Huon Valley.	Mar	Annual
Hobart Festival of Comedy	Arts & Culture	Multi-day comedy festival presenting local, Australian, and international stand-up acts across Hobart.	Mar	Annual
Targa Tasmania	Sports & Recreation	Tarmac rally event held in stages across roads statewide.	Apr–May	Annual
Agfest	Food & Agriculture	Major agricultural field day and trade fair held in Carrick.	May	Annual
Dark Mofo	Arts & Culture	Midwinter arts, music, and performance festival hosted by MONA.	Jun	Annual
Festival of Voices	Arts & Culture	Celebrating the transformative power of singing, held annually in venues statewide.	Jul	Annual
Beaker Street Festival	Science & Community	Science and art festival centred at the Tasmanian Museum and Art Gallery and venues around Hobart.	Aug	Annual
TastroFest	Science & Community	Astronomy and science festival held in Ulverstone.	Aug	Annual
Tasmania Super440	Sports & Recreation	Supercars Championship round held at Symmons Plains Raceway near Launceston.	Aug–Sep	Annual
Junction Arts Festival	Arts & Culture	Contemporary art, light, and music festival held in Launceston.	Sep	Annual
Burnie Ten	Sports & Recreation	A 10 km road race held on a Sunday in October every year in Burnie along Emu Bay.	Oct	Annual
Royal Hobart Show	Food & Agriculture	Hobart city show and agricultural exposition.	Oct	Annual
Royal Launceston Show	Food & Agriculture	Launceston city show and agricultural exposition.	Oct	Annual
Wynyard Tulip Festival	Food & Agriculture	Flower and entertainment festival celebrating of coming of spring featuring displays of blooming flowers, live music and food.	Oct	Annual
The Unconformity	Arts & Culture	Cultural and site-specific arts festival exploring the landscape of Queenstown.	Oct	Biennial
Terror Australis Readers and Writers Festival	Arts & Culture	Annual crime and mystery literary festival held in southern Tasmania.	Oct–Nov	Annual
Farmgate Festival	Food & Agriculture	Agricultural tour celebrating farms, producers, and vineyards in the West Tamar.	Nov	Annual
Huon Show	Food & Agriculture	Agricultural and community show held in Ranelagh.	Nov	Annual
Point to Pinnacle	Sports & Recreation	Half-marathon run and walk from Wrest Point Hotel Casino to the summit of kunanyi / Mount Wellington.	Nov	Annual
Launceston to Hobart Yacht Race	Sports & Recreation	Coastal yacht race along Tasmania's eastern coast from the Tamar River to Hobart.	Dec	Annual
Melbourne to Hobart Yacht Race	Sports & Recreation	"Westcoaster" ocean yacht race from Port Phillip Heads around the western and southern coasts of Tasmania to Hobart.	Dec	Annual
Sydney to Hobart Yacht Race	Sports & Recreation	Blue-water yacht race starting in Sydney Harbour and finishing at Hobart's Sullivans Cove.	Dec	Annual
Burnie Gift	Sports & Recreation	Premier Australian running carnival considered one of the 'big three' professional Gifts in Australia.	Dec–Jan	Annual
Taste of Summer	Food & Agriculture	Waterfront food, wine, and produce festival held at Princes Wharf No. 1 in Hobart.	Dec–Jan	Annual

== Past events (no longer held) ==
- Falls Festival (Marion Bay edition) – New Year's Eve music and arts festival held in Marion Bay from 2003 to 2019.
- Gone South – Music festival formerly held in Launceston.
- MONA FOMA – Contemporary music and arts festival curated by Brian Ritchie and presented by MONA (held 2009–2024).
- MS Fest – Charity music event held in Launceston to raise money for multiple sclerosis.
- Southern Roots Festival – Music festival held in Hobart.
- Taste of Tasmania – Long-running summer food and beverage festival replaced by the Taste of Summer in 2021.

== See also ==
- Sport in Tasmania
- Culture of Tasmania
- Festivals of Australia
