= Festival of Voices =

- Genre: Choral, a cappella, contemporary, cabaret, classical
- Dates: June–July (winter)
- Frequency: Annually
- Locations: Hobart and regional Tasmania, Australia
- Coordinates: 42°53′00″S 147°19′48″E
- Years active: 2005–present
- Attendance: 35,000 (2025)
- Website: festivalofvoices.com

The Festival of Voices is an annual winter vocal music festival held in Hobart and across regional Tasmania, Australia. It presents performances, workshops and massed-singing events involving community choirs, professional vocal ensembles, soloists and guest artists.

== History ==
Festival of Voices was established in 2005 as a participatory winter event for singers of varying experience levels, from beginners to professional performers. The Festival of Voices predates the launch of Hobart's Dark Mofo winter arts festival in 2013.

The festival has since expanded to include events in regional Tasmania, including Launceston, the East Coast and the North West.

During the COVID-19 pandemic, the 2020 festival was cancelled. The festival returned in 2021 under public-health restrictions, with mask-wearing and COVID-19 check-in requirements applicable to all events.

== Funding and government support ==
Festival of Voices describes itself as a not-for-profit organisation and a registered charity.

The Tasmanian Government provided $2.25 million in funding to the festival for the period 2023 to 2025. In 2026, the City of Hobart provided a $72,000 events partnership, while the Tasmanian Government committed funding to the festival until 2028. The festival previously received a $50,000 capacity-building grant in 2014.

== Performers and guests ==
Performers and guests have included Australian artists Christine Anu, Beccy Cole, Kate Ceberano, Katie Noonan, Jean Stafford and Darren Percival, as well as international and visiting artists including The Exchange, Deke Sharon and Take 6.

== See also ==
- Dark Mofo
- Ten Days on the Island
- List of events in Tasmania
