= Lostep =

Australian production duo

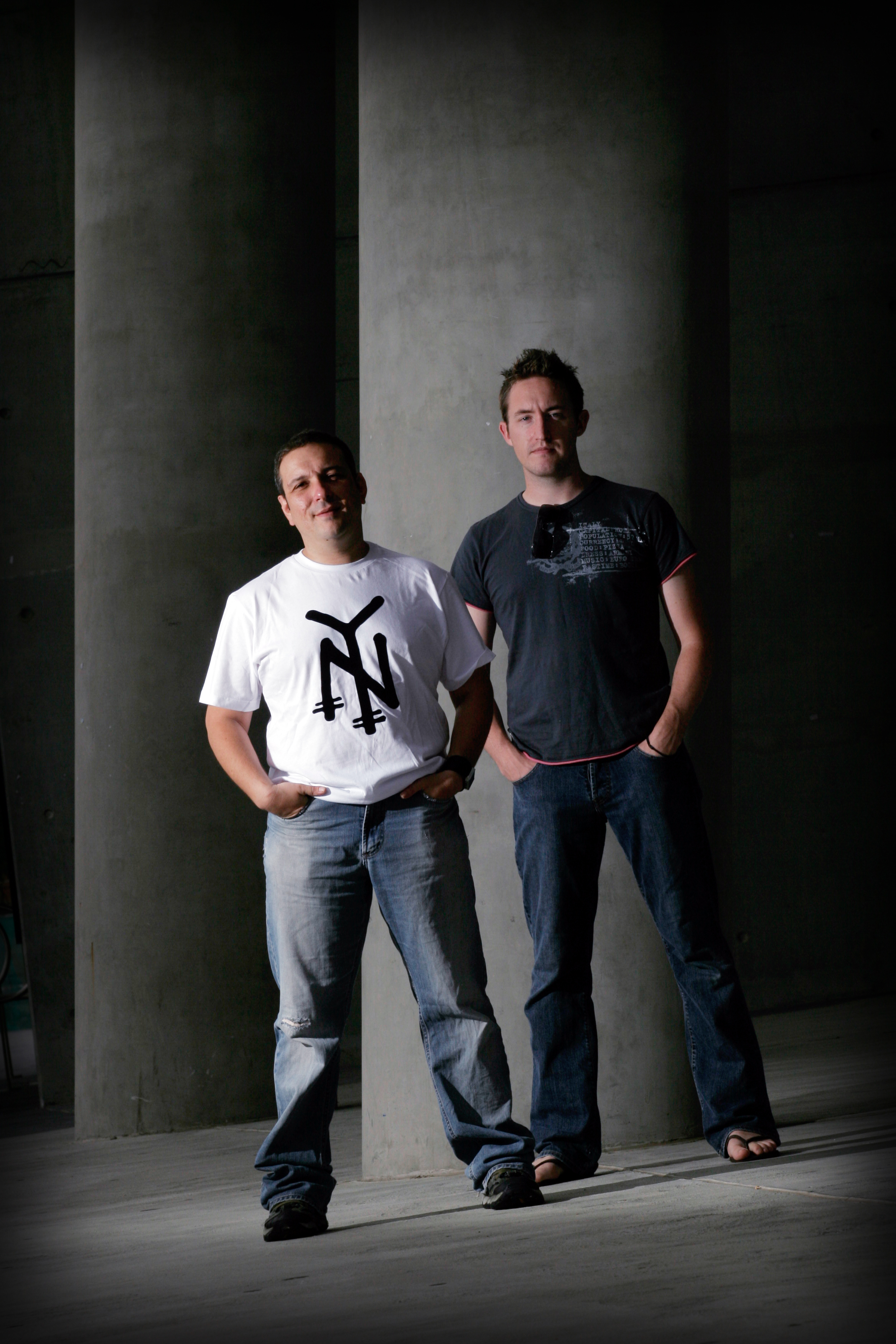

Background information
- Origin: Melbourne, Australia
- Labels: Global Underground
- Members: Luke Chable
- Past members: Phil K

Lostep was a production duo composed of Australian producers Luke Chable and Phil K. They have released singles on labels such as Eq [Grey]. Additionally, their music has appeared on compilations by Sasha and Dave Seaman. In April 2006, Lostep released their first full album, Because We Can on GU Music. The pair also used to DJ together.

== History ==
According to their website, accidental discovery is a theme which underlay Lostep's musical approach. While Luke Chable and Phil K were already successful DJs and producers, the collaboration that became Lostep was not necessarily a well-planned endeavor so much as something that took place organically over a period of time. Individually, Luke and Phil had both mixed albums and released records for some of the biggest electronic music labels in the world and had both performed in some of the world's biggest and best nightclubs. But it was through their mutual love for electronic music and the spirit of artistic collaboration that Lostep finally came to full fruition.

The two initially began a loose collaboration in the studio with the support of Ivan Gough, mostly just the two having fun remixing and creating experimental new material. Eventually the duo produced their first single as a group, titled "The Roots," featuring vocalist Lior Attar. Fellow DJ and producer Dave Seaman was enthusiastic about the track and featured it on his electronic mix compilation Global Underground 22: Dave Seaman in Melbourne, which was released in 2002.

The duo's next single "Burma" was another organic collaboration composed once again in Phil's loungeroom studio. The two sent the completed track to friend and fellow producer Sasha, who later included it in his CD compilation album, Involver, which was released in 2004.

Several years later, after months of on-again, off-again collaboration in the studio, Lostep released their first album, Because We Can, which quickly received widespread acclaim in the electronic music scene. The album has been described as a “dreamlike sequence,” rather than a typical mix album, and the musical style could fall under a variety of categories, including Breakbeat, IDM (Intelligent Dance Music), Deep House and experimental.

Phil K died of prostate cancer on November 1st, 2020.

== Discography ==
Studio albums

- 2006: Because We Can (Global Music Records)

Singles

- 2002: The Roots (feat. Lior Attar) (Global Underground)
- 2004: Burma (Global Underground)
- 2007: Dr Kings Surgery (Global Underground)
- 2007: Villain (Global Underground)
