= Huon Show =

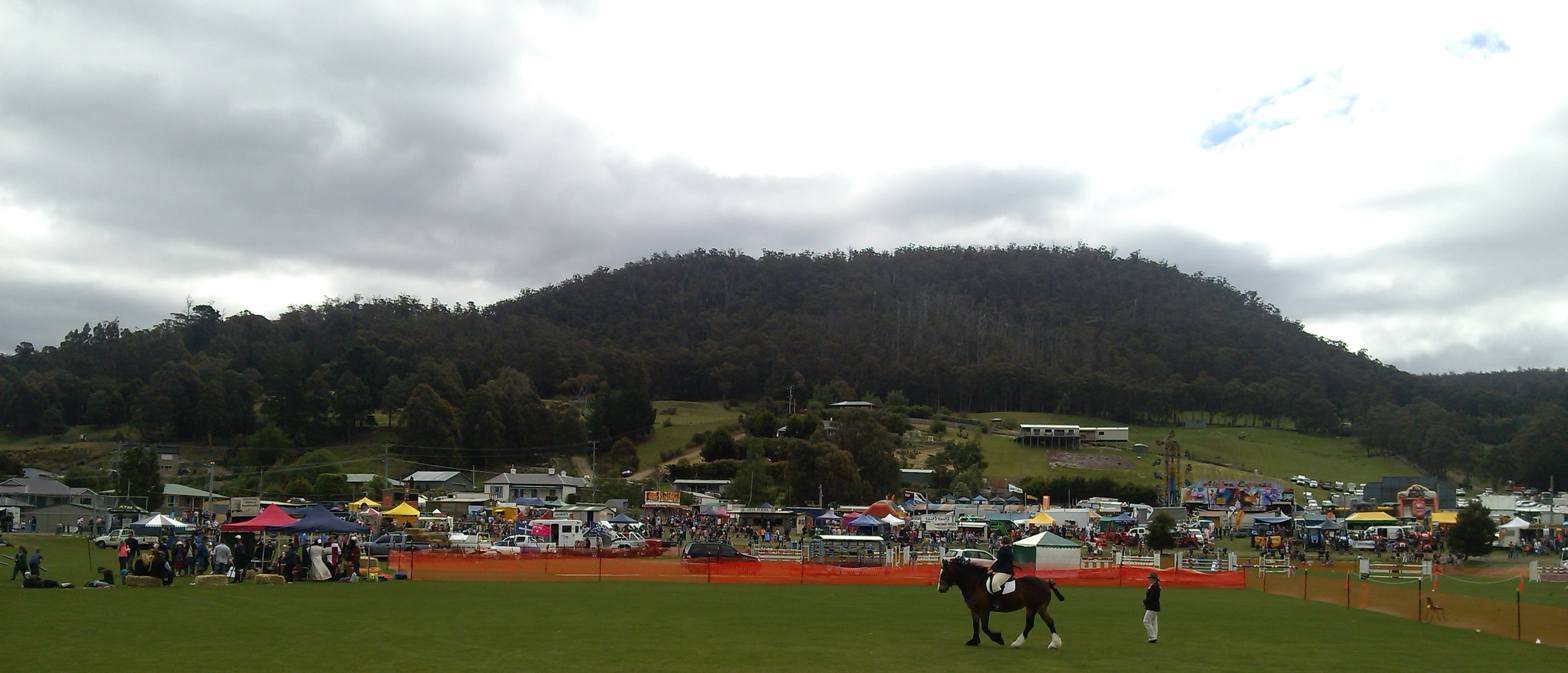
- 2014 Huon Show
- Status: Active
- Genre: Agricultural show
- Date: 2nd weekend of November
- Frequency: Annually
- Venue: Ranelagh Showgrounds
- Locations: Ranelagh, Huon Valley, Tasmania
- Country: Australia
- Years active: 1947–2019, 2022–
- Inaugurated: 8 December 1947
- Previous event: 15 November 2025
- Next event: 14 November 2026
- Attendance: 13,000
- Organiser: Huon Agricultural Society, Inc
- Website: huonshow.com.au

The Huon Show or Huon Agricultural Show is an annual agricultural show running from 1947 to 2019 & since 2022, located at Ranelagh Showgrounds in Ranelagh in the Huon Valley, Tasmania, Australia. It attracts around 13,000 visitors yearly, featuring a range of attractions including a large local produce section, exhibition livestock including a large Alpaca section, flower competitions, and over 102 stalls by local businesses. It is held on the second Saturday of every November, though it used to be held on 8 December, which was for some time a bank holiday for residents of the Huon Valley.

This show was on hiatus in 2020-21 because of COVID-19 pandemic, but it returned in 2022.

Marion Woodward has served as assistant secretary and then secretary of the show since 1967.

== See also ==
- List of events in Tasmania
