= What Happened Don't Lie =

Studio album by Offcutts
- Released: March 2007
- Genre: Indie pop
- Length: 33:50
- Label: Rubber Records
- Producers: Tommy Spender and Az

Offcutts chronology
| Diamond Bike EP (2006) | What Happened Don't Lie (2007) |

Professional ratings
Review scores
| Source | Rating |
|---|---|
| Time Off Magazine | 4.5/5 stars |

What Happened Don't Lie is the debut album from Melbourne band Offcutts. It is the first full-length release following seven EPs over five years.

== Track listing ==
1. "Diamond Bike"
2. "Fearless Fighters"
3. "By The Way"
4. "Shirt & Tie"
5. "Cold Morning Happiness"
6. "Valium Girl"
7. "Hub Cap"
8. "Hit Me with Your Best Shot (Pat Benatar Cover)"
9. "Stand Back"
10. "Youth Song"
