= Charles Touber =

Australian businessman and tour promoter

Charles Touber is an Australian businessman and tour promoter from Hobart, Tasmania. He is best known as the organiser of the Gone South series of festivals in Launceston and Hobart in the early 2000s, as well as the Southern Roots Festival in Hobart in 2007.

== Early life and career ==
Touber was a candidate for the Australian Senate in the 1996 Australian federal election, but did not win a seat.

Touber was formerly a member of a band called The Innocents, who were "one-hit wonders" in the 1970s, and reformed in 2000 to play at the International Pop Overthrow festival in the United States.

In more recent years Touber has acted as a music promoter. In 2004 he was unable to resurrect his Gone South Music Festival, and in 2009 his Southern Roots Festival failed, with Touber blaming rises in the Australian dollar. Also in 2009 a scheduled performance by international 1980s legends Madness was cancelled by its Promoter Touber the morning of the show, with Touber blaming poor ticket sales.

In 2011 Touber was appointed promoter of the cancelled 2012 MSFest, a fundraiser run for the MS Society of Tasmania in 2006, which had previously been funded and operated by promotions company Opcon from 2007 to 2011 delivering sellout events, and which at its peak had attracted an audience of 13,000. After the MS Society Of Tasmania's refusal to enter into a reasonable licensing agreement with its operating partner Opcon, Touber took over the event operation while the charity took up the funding and a new festival was established in Hobart under the MSFest brand. Despite best efforts there was no recovery for the event, which struggled to attract a satisfactory lineup along with the success of Opcon's rebranded Breath Of Life festival in Launceston. On 28 February 2012 - four days before the event - it was announced the MSFest 2012 was unviable, and was cancelled by the MS Society board with the charity accruing huge financial loses.
