= Enola Fall =

Australian musical group

- Also known as: Melatonin, Joe Nuttall and Enola Fall
- Origin: Hobart, Tasmania, Australia
- Genres: indie, Pop
- Years active: 2003–present
- Labels: MGM, Indie
- Members: Joe Nuttall; Mark Woodward; Paul Doyle
- Past members: Adam D’Andrea; Hamish Cruickshank; Kieran Holm; Linc LeFevre; Matthew Moller; Psam Parsons; Elliot Taylor

Enola Fall are an Australian indie rock, pop band formed in Hobart, Tasmania in 2003. Original members were Adam D’Andrea, Kieran Holm and Joe Nuttall; Nuttall has continued with later members of Mark Woodward and Paul Doyle.

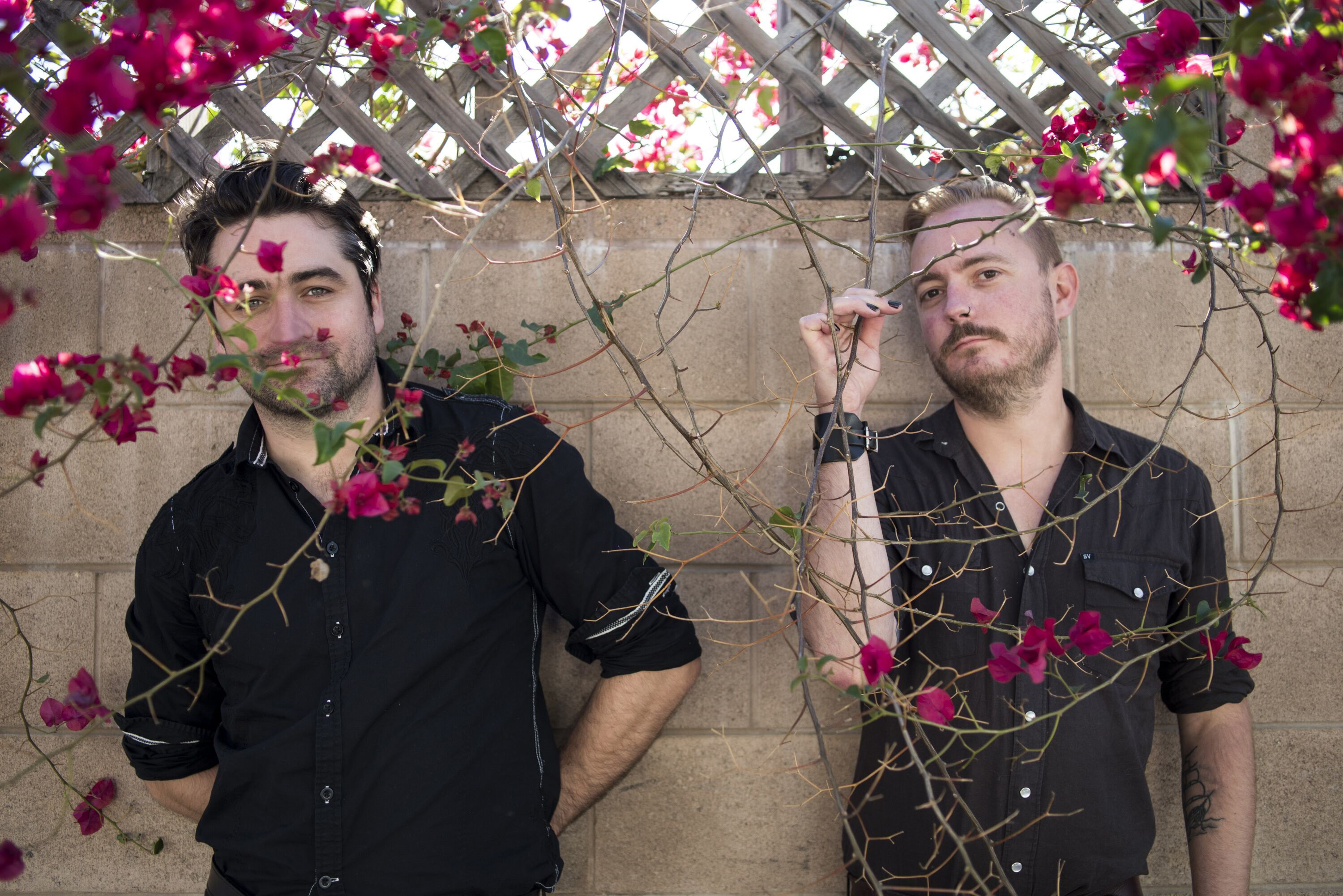
Joe Nuttall and Mark Woodward in 2019

== History ==
Melatonin formed in 2001 in Hobart, Tasmania with Adam D’Andrea on drums, Kieran Holm on bass guitar and Joe Nuttall on vocals and guitar. They released the self-titled debut album Melatonin in that year. They were joined by guitarist, Matthew Moller in 2002 and issued their second album, The City and the Sea. Psam Parsons on keyboards, mandolin and backing vocals became a member and their third album, It Always Comes to This appeared in 2003. They changed the band name from Melatonin to Enola Fall and performed at venues in Eastern Australia and at the Falls Festival music event in Marion Bay. Since 2003, they toured Europe five months and have supported Architecture in Helsinki, Eskimo Joe, The Panics, Violent Femmes, Amanda Palmer and Something for Kate.

Their first album as Enola Fall, We Never Sleep, was released in 2005 and is in the National Library of Australia collection. By December 2008, the line-up was Nuttall, Tristan Barnes, Elliot Taylor and Linc LeFevre. Their album, Glorious Five Year Plan, was issued on the MGM label and appeared on Apple's iTunes store on 10 January.

In 2011 the band released I am an Aerial followed by extensive touring with acts such as The Jezabels, The Beards, Tales in Space, Regurgitator, and performances at Falls, Peats Ridge, and MONA FOMA festivals. This was followed by the 'Suburban Lovers' EP and 'Heliotropic' in 2015.

The band then travelled to the US to perform at the Culture Collide and CMJ festivals.

The current band lineup consists of Joe Nuttall: Vocals, guitars, piano, Mark Woodward: Bass, vocals, woodwind and Paul Doyle: Drums.

In 2018 Enola Fall released their Bloodhound while based in the US. This was followed by residencies and touring across the West Coast. The upcoming album Submarine will be released in 2020 preceded by the lead single Be Fine.

== Discography ==
=== Albums ===
Melatonin

- Melatonin (2001)
- The City and the Sea (2002)
- It Always Comes to This (2003)

Enola Fall

- We Never Sleep (2005)
- Glorious Five Year Plan (MGM, 2008)
  1. "I Don't Drive"
  2. "Punctured Lung"
  3. "Isle of the Dead"
  4. "Glory Days"
  5. "We Become Wolves"
  6. "One Winged Plane"
  7. "Black Blood"
  8. "Every Prick Has His Day"
  9. "Tell It on the Mountain"
- I am an Aerial EP (Creative Vibes, 2011)
  1. "Andromeda"
  2. "Radio_None"
  3. "[Murder of Crows]"
  4. "I am an Aerial"
  5. "Letters to Me"
- Suburban Lovers EP (MGM, 2013)
  1. "Scared of Boys"
  2. "Friends in High Places"
  3. "Miseryguts"
  4. "Cold Souls"
  5. "Spiders in the Trees"
- Heliotropic (MGM, 2015)
  1. "Unloveable"
  2. "Stab On!"
  3. "Dirigibles"
  4. "Surrender"
  5. "Lions"
  6. "Pilot Light"
  7. "Down in the Well"
  8. "Heliotropic"
