= Josh Thomas (blues guitarist) =

Australian born blues guitarist (born 1970)

- Born: c. 1970
- Genres: Blues
- Occupation(s): Singer, guitarist, songwriter
- Instruments: Vocals; Guitar
- Years active: 1995–present
- Labels: CAAMA Music; Festival Mushroom Records
- Website: www.joshthomasmusic.com

Josh Thomas (born c. 1970) is an Australian blues guitarist born in Adelaide, South Australia. His family comes from the Northern Territory's Barkly Tablelands. His parents were from the stolen generation.

In the 1990s, he was a member of Thylacine, who released two albums through CAAMA music, Thylacine Live (1995) and Nightmare Dreaming (1997). In 1998 he won Triple J's Unearthed competition. He played guitars on the 2005 Australian Songwriters Association (ASA)'s 'Songwriter of the Year' award winning, "Someone Special" by Worldfly. Thomas is contracted to two record labels CAAMA Music and Festival Mushroom Records.

In 2009, Thomas supported Eric Bibb at the Darwin Entertainment Centre. In 2010 he headlined the Darwin Blues Festival, with his Jimi Hendrix tribute band, Purple Daze. He also performed at the 2011 Darwin Blues Festival with his band Cold Turkey.

In 2012, Thomas played lead guitar for Big Bill Morganfield's Australian performance.

== Solo discography ==
=== Albums ===
- The Blues – (30 January 2008)
- Bread 'n' Butta – (10 January 2009)
- Lady Luck – (27 February 2009)

=== Singles and EPs ===
- "Blues, Blues, Blues" – (2 February 2011)
- "Standing at the Crossroads" (22 March 2011)
