= Royal Hobart Showground =

Sports and show venue in Hobart, Tasmania

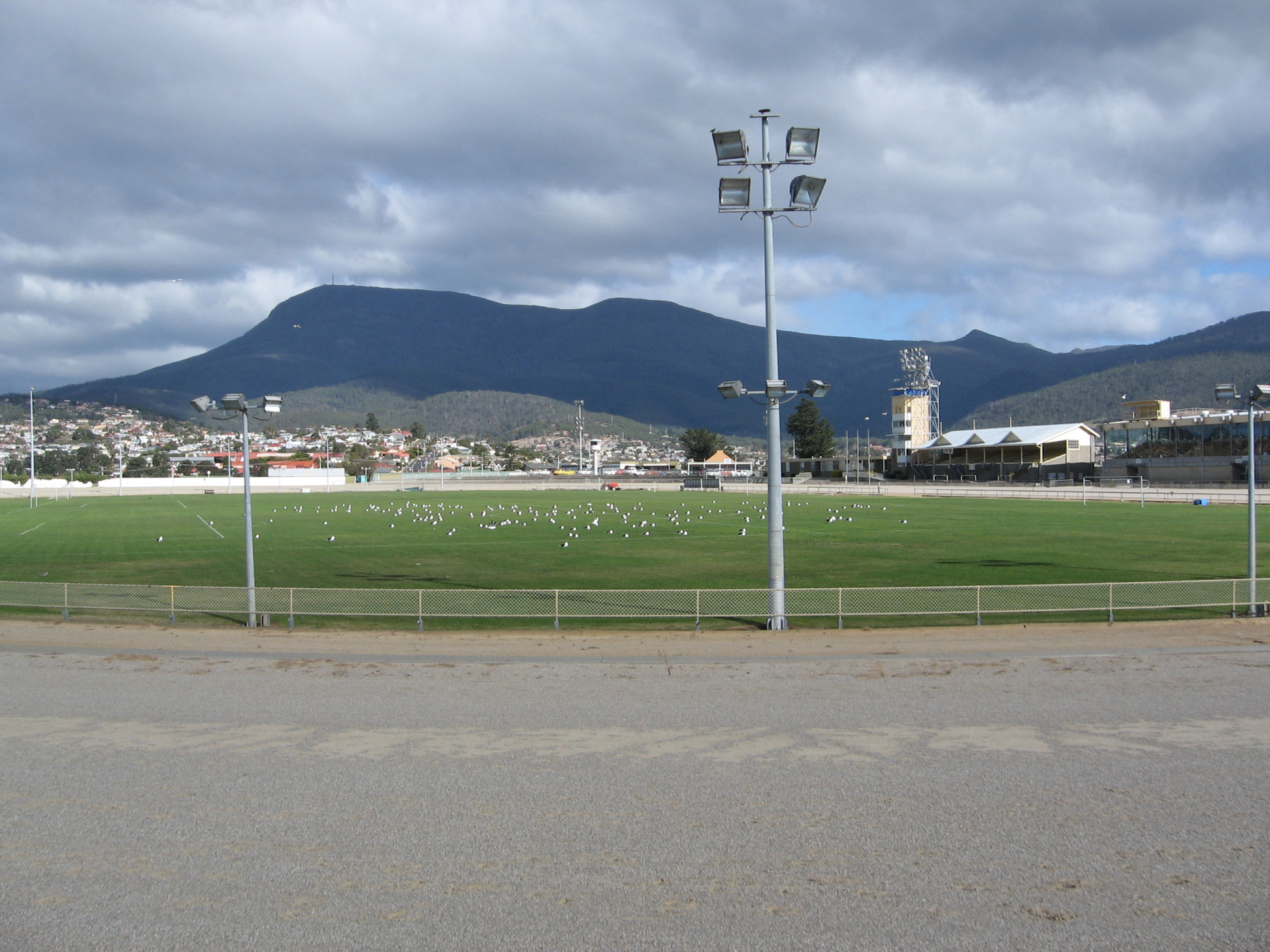
- Interactive map of Royal Hobart Showground
- Location: Glenorchy, Hobart.
- Coordinates: 42°49′48″S 147°17′09″E
- Owner: Royal Agricultural Society of Tasmania
- Surface: Mixed

Construction
- Opened: 1927
- Renovated: 1980

The Royal Hobart Showgrounds are the site of the Royal Hobart Show and many other smaller events including a market on the grounds every Sunday. The Royal Hobart Showground is located 10 km north of Hobart, between the junction to Brooker Highway/Goodwood Road and the Main Road in Glenorchy.

== Royal Hobart Show ==
The Royal Hobart Show is an annual event held at the Royal Showgrounds in October. The event focuses on the rural exploits of Tasmanians with events such as livestock judging and wood chopping. Also popular at the event are show bags and rides. In many ways it can be considered similar (although smaller) to the Sydney Royal Easter Show. The show runs for four days, Wednesday through to Saturday, ending on the fourth Saturday in October.

== History ==
The first show was in January 1822, in the Old Market Place, just in front of the present State Parliament House. The venue of the Royal Hobart Show has varied over the past 184 years and has included Salamanca Place, Bridgewater, New Town, Tattersalls Park and even the Hobart Town Hall.

In 1903, the Royal Agricultural Society of Tasmania purchased the 40 acres (160,000 m^{2}) of bushland then known as the "Elwick Knoll" at a cost of £2525. The following year the first Show was held at its current location, the Elwick Showground. In 1922 His Majesty King George V approved the granting of the prefix ‘Royal’ to the Society and in turn became known as The Royal Agricultural Society of Tasmania.

A $4 million redevelopment of the Showgrounds took place in 1980 and provided Pacing and Greyhound Racing facilities, an upgraded arena suitable for a variety of events, and the enclosed Grandstand and Amenities building which includes bars, restaurants, betting hall, meeting rooms and offices. The 1981 Inter Dominion was held at the Showgrounds. From 2004-2008, the Pacing facilities have merged with Thoroughbred Racing at Elwick Racecourse, just down the road.

=== Hobart Greyhound Racing Club ===
The Hobart Greyhound Racing Club (HGRC) switched to the Hobart Showground when it moved out of the TCA Ground in 1980. After racing for 26 years at the Showground, the HGRC moved to the new $20 million development at Elwick Racecourse in 2006.

=== Future redevelopment ===
In April 2012 the RAST (Royal Agricultural Society of Tasmania) board of management announced plans to redevelop large sections of the showgrounds, including parcelling out sections for commercial use and the demolition of the current Poultry, Dog, Cat and other exhibition pavilions to be replaced with just two pavilions for companion animals and livestock during the show.

== Other uses ==
In addition to the Royal Hobart Show that is conducted annually, The Showgrounds hosted the Royal Hobart International Wine show, the second largest Wine Show in Australia and the only Wine Show in the world believed to be conducted in line with ISO 9001 quality management system certification standards. In recent years the showground has hosted the Royal Hobart Fine Food Awards and the Tasmanian Vineyard of the Year Competitions, as well as attracting music events like the Southern Roots Festival in 2007 and the Eskimo Joe live show in 2006.

Since May 2007, the grounds have been the site of the headquarters of Football Federation Tasmania. In addition, various animal fancy events, including exhibits of cats, dogs, poultry, rabbits and guinea pigs, are held by animal fancier clubs at venues in the showgrounds.
