= Bianca Voitek =

German bodybuilder (born 1985)

Bianca Voitek (born 15 November 1985) is a German female bodybuilder.

She has been successful at following bodybuilding contests:

2003 Daunaucup Women 1 : 2 place
Newcomer Women 1 : 2 place
26. Oktober 2003 Int. Süddeutsche Meisterschaft Women 1 : 1 place
2005 Süddeutschen Meisterschaft Women 3.place
2005 Junior World Championship 4.place
2008 Deutsche Meisterschaft 2.place
2009 Süddeutsche Meisterschaft Women 2.place
