= Dern Rutlidge =

- Origin: Melbourne, Victoria, Australia
- Genre: Stoner rock
- Years active: 1998–2003
- Labels: High Beam Music, International Trash
- Members: Jason PC; Jason Miszewski; Craig Westwood; Callan O'Hara

Dern Rutlidge (stylised as DernRutlidge) were an Australian stoner rock band from Melbourne. Formed around 1998 by Jason Miszewski and Craig Westwood from Christbait and Budd, Jason PC from Blood Duster and Callan O'Hara from Drool. They were named after two characters in a Jack Daniels' ad.

Dern Rutlidge released one full-length album which was well received by critics. Beat magazine gave it their Album of the Week, The Age gave it 3.5* and Hellride Music gave it 9/10. The first single from the album, "Lines on the Table", was placed on high rotation on Triple J and they played a live set for Triple J's Home and Hosed program.

== Members ==
- Jason "P.C." Fuller - bass
- Craig Westwood - vocals, guitar
- Jason Miszewski - guitar
- Callan O'Hara - drums

== Discography ==
Albums:

Johnny No Stars

- Released: 2001
- Format: CD
- Label: High Beam Music

EPs and Singles:

All So Lonely

- Released: 1999
- Format: 7"
- Label: International Trash

High As The Sun on This Midnight Run

- Released: 1999
- Format: CD
- Label: International Trash

Skyblue (split with Warped)

- Released: 2000
- Format: 7"

"Lines on the Table" from the album Johnny No Stars

- Released: 2001
- Format: cd
- Label: High Beam Music

"When I'm Rockin'" from the album Johnny No Stars

- Released: 2001
- Format: cd
- Label: High Beam Music
