= Worldfly =

Band

Worldfly is a band from Darwin, Australia. Their current line-up is Michael Maher - vocalist; Rebecca Harris - cello; Stewart Taylor - bass; Jarren Boyd- drums; Brad Jackson - electric guitars.

They released their debut album, It's Too Late For Turning Back, in April 2009. It was produced by Tim Cole (Not Drowning Waving, David Bridie)

In May 2009 the album It's Too Late For Turning Back was selected as Feature Album and placed on high rotation on ABC DiG, one of the national digital radio services from Australian Broadcasting Corporation.

== Discography ==
- It's Too Late For Turning Back (2009)
- A World Gone Crazy (2013)
