= Thylacine (band) =

Australian rock band

- Origin: Darwin, Northern Territory, Australia
- Genres: Rock music
- Labels: CAAMA Music
- Past members: Josh Thomas; Brendon Barlow; Roger Prowse; Leon Hewer

Thylacine was a three piece Australian rock band from the Northern Territory active during the 1990s. Thylacine was formed by indigenous guitarist, Josh Thomas (Mixed Relations, Joe Geia, Us Mob), in Darwin, Northern Territory. The band toured from Darwin to Adelaide and performed at the Adelaide Grand Prix, universities and numerous folk festivals.

The band released the first album, Thylacine Live, through CAAMA Music, in 1995. It was described as being a good strong rock album.

In 1997 they released their second album, Nightmare Dreaming, also through CAAMA Music. The album was recorded and produced by Tom Colley at CAAMA Music Studios in Alice Springs and mastered at Grevillea Studios in Brisbane.

Nightmare Dreaming according to critics was a "passionate hard-core album with an obvious likeness to Nine Inch Nails. This album boasts rasping guitars and powerful deep vocals. The sequenced keyboards on several tracks stand out and Josh’s multi-instrumental skills are used to the full." It was also described as being "13 tracks for lost romantics who are standing on the edge of extinction, just like the Thylacine".
