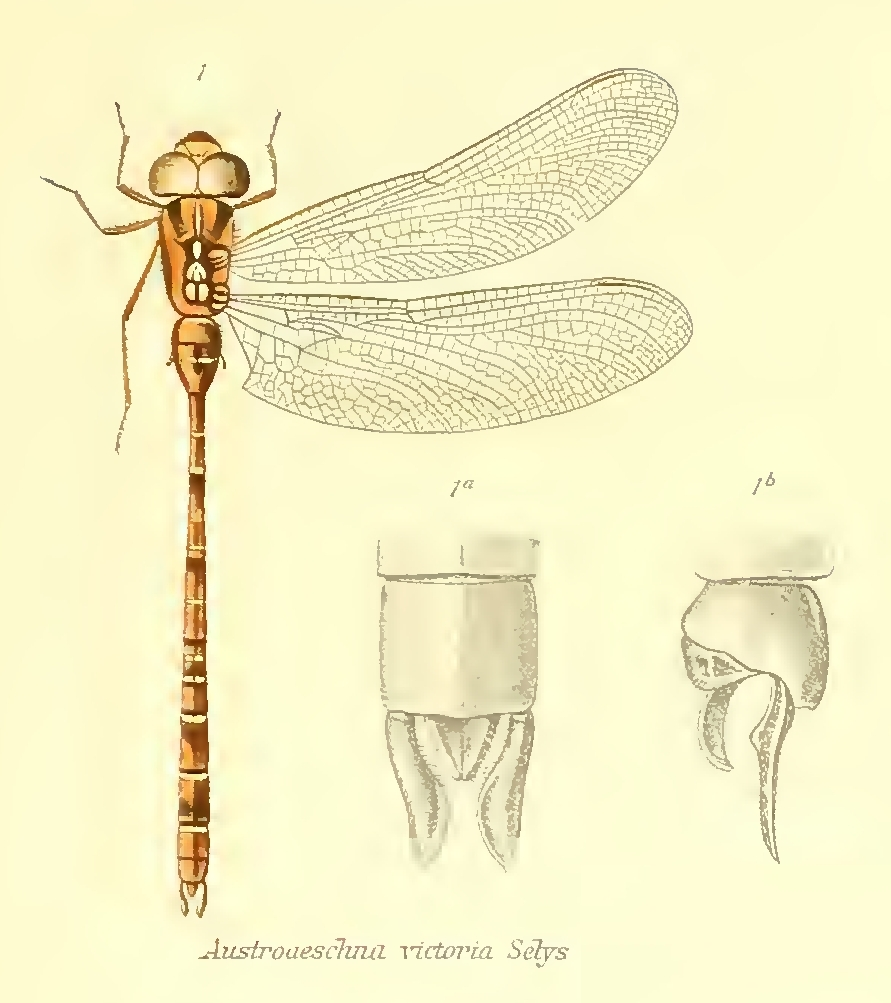
- Male

Conservation status
- Endangered (IUCN 3.1)

Scientific classification
- Kingdom: Animalia
- Phylum: Arthropoda
- Clade: Pancrustacea
- Class: Insecta
- Order: Odonata
- Suborder: Anisoptera
- Family: Aeshnidae
- Genus: Acanthaeschna; Selys, 1883
- Species: A. victoria

Binomial name
- Acanthaeschna victoria Martin, 1901

= Acanthaeschna victoria =

Thylacine darner

Species of dragonfly

Acanthaeschna victoria, the thylacine darner, is a species of Australian dragonfly in the family Aeshnidae. It is the only member of the genus Acanthaeschna. Acanthaeschna victoria is rare and endemic to coastal areas of both southern and northern New South Wales as well as southern Queensland. Its natural habitat is intertidal marshes. It is threatened by habitat loss.

== Appearance ==
Acanthaeschna victoria is a large, brown dragonfly with a distinctive dark band on the side of its body that runs from the head to the abdomen. Their abdomens are long and thin with bands around the segments. It has clear wings with a small dark stain at the nodus, the joint near the middle of the leading edge of each wing. The pterostigma is clear with a yellowish tinge to it.

== Etymology ==
The genus name Acanthaeschna is derived from the Greek ἄκανθα (akantha, "thorn" or "spine"), combined with -aeschna, a suffix commonly used for dragonflies associated with the Aeshna group. The name refers to the spine-like teeth at the tip of the female abdomen.

In 1901, René Martin named this species victoria, possibly in reference to Queen Victoria, who reigned from 1837 to 1901.

== Gallery ==
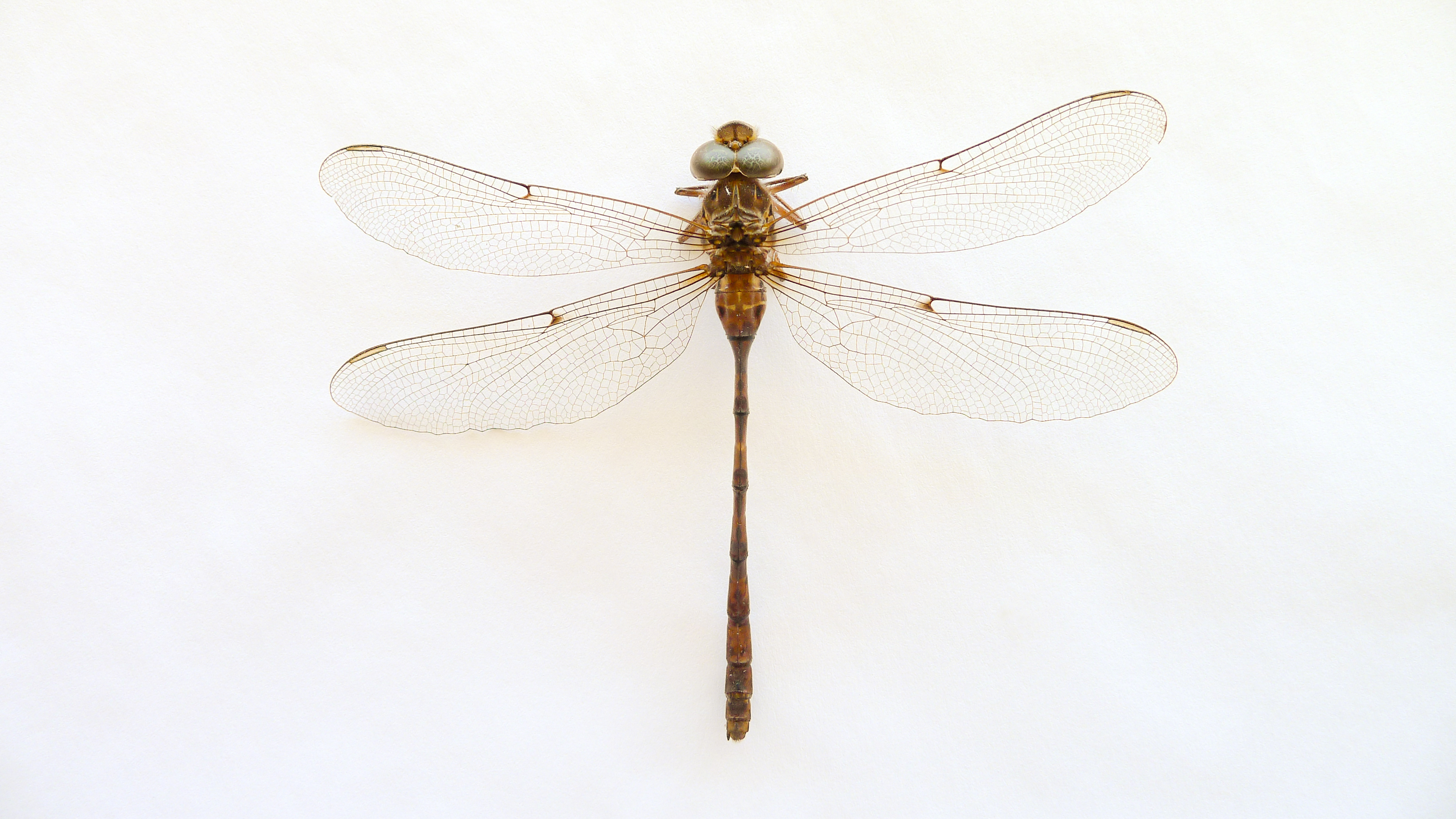
Female

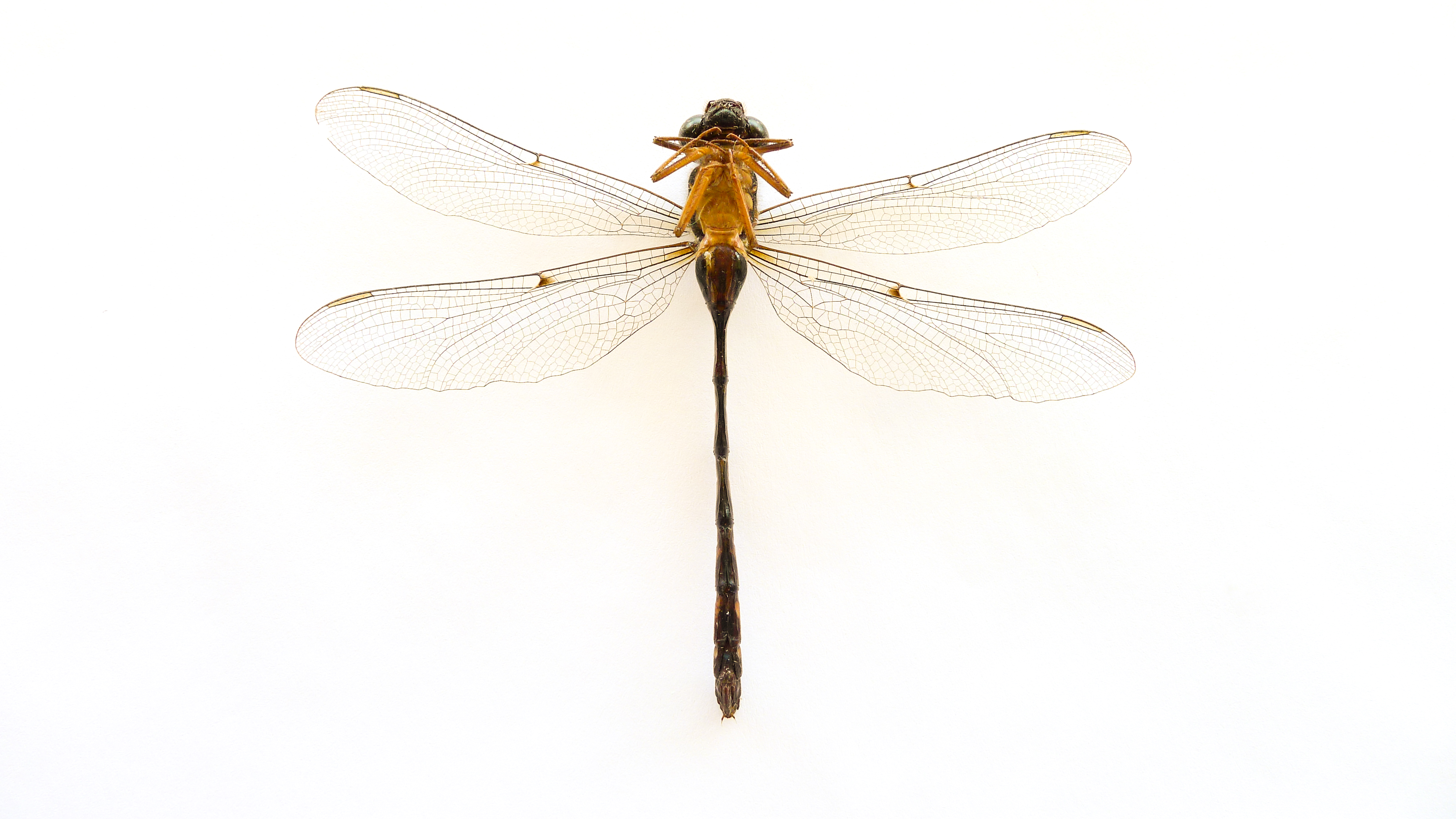
Female from below

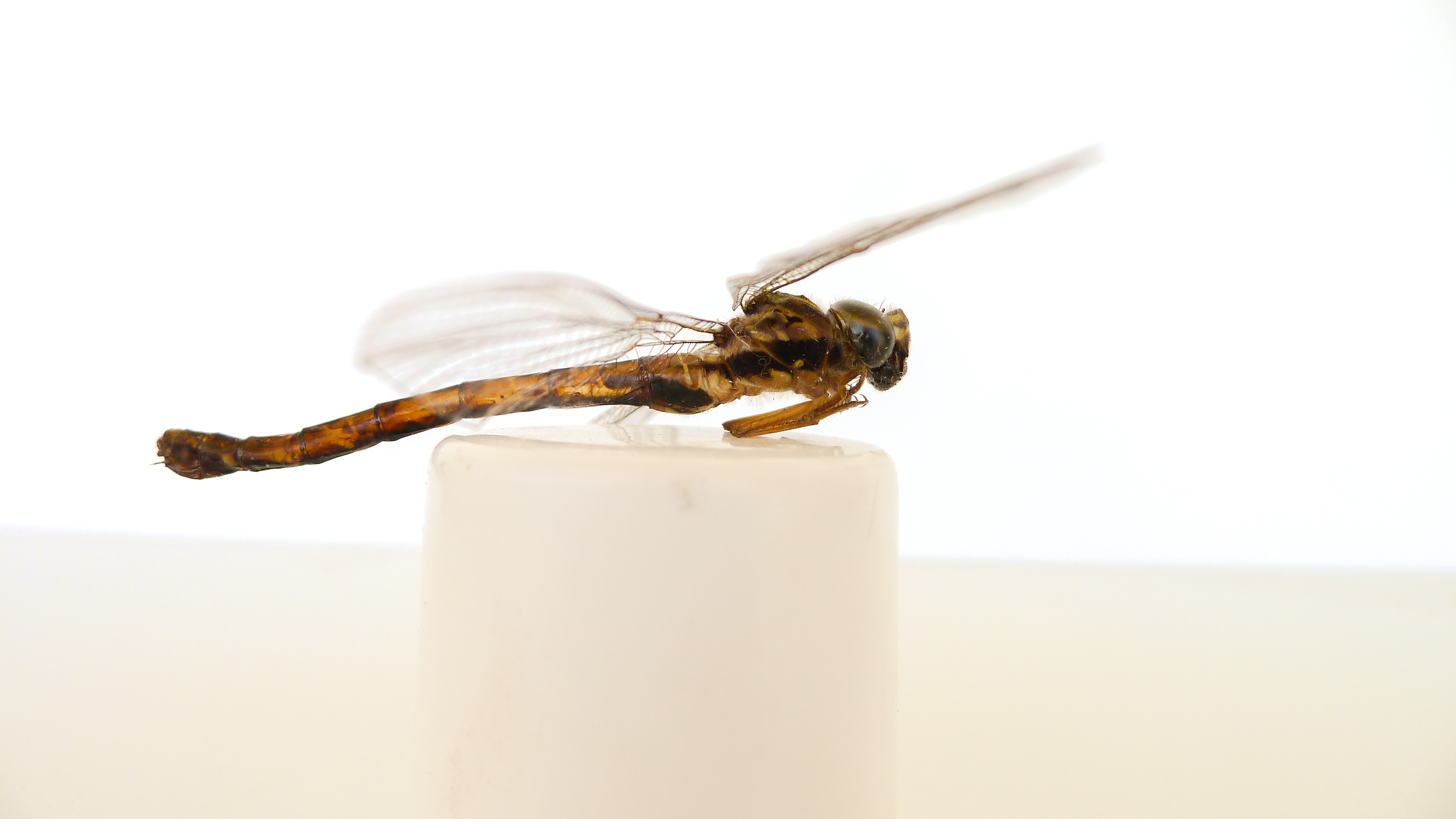
Female showing a broad dark band on the side of her body

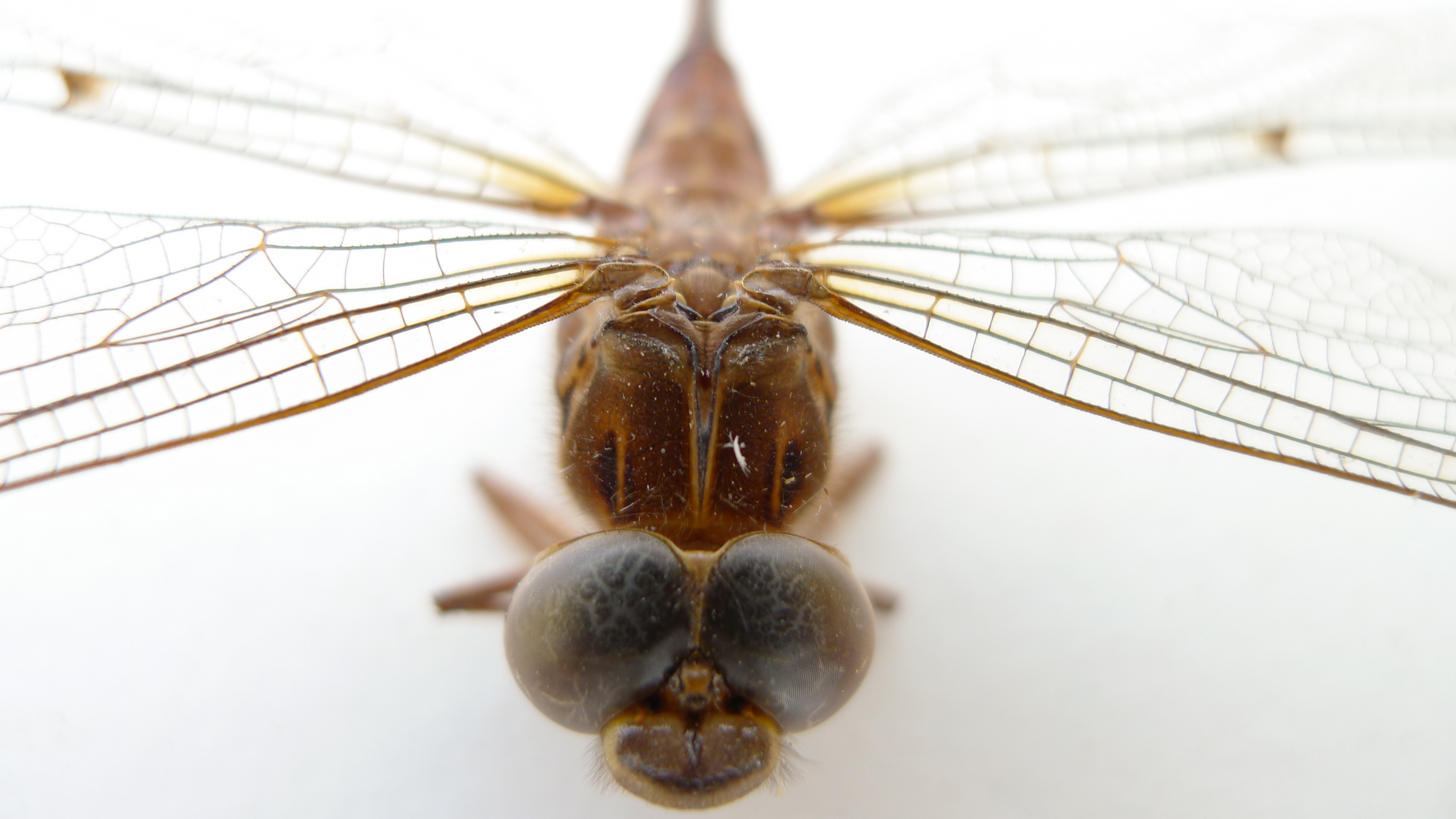
Eyes

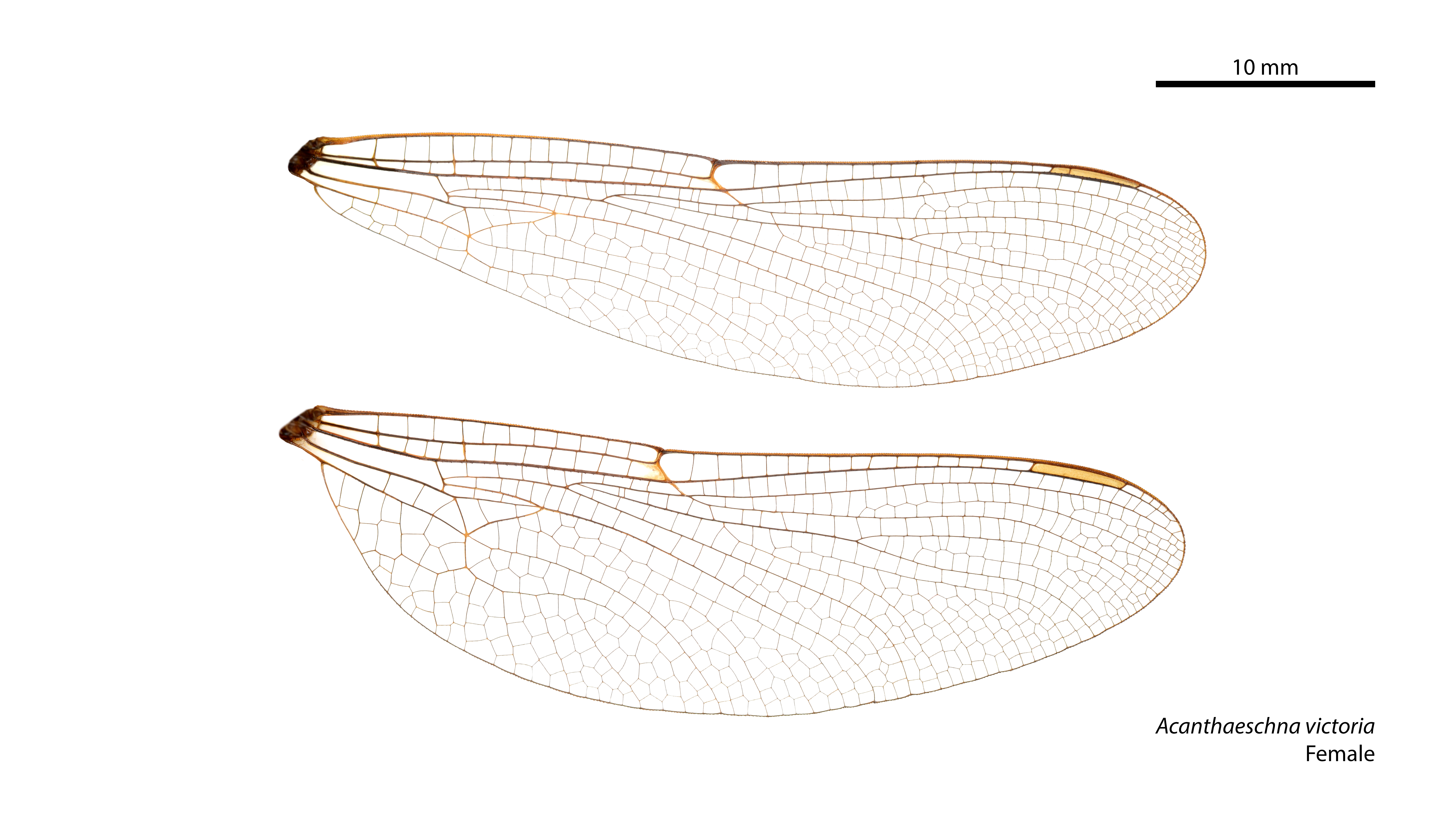
Female wings

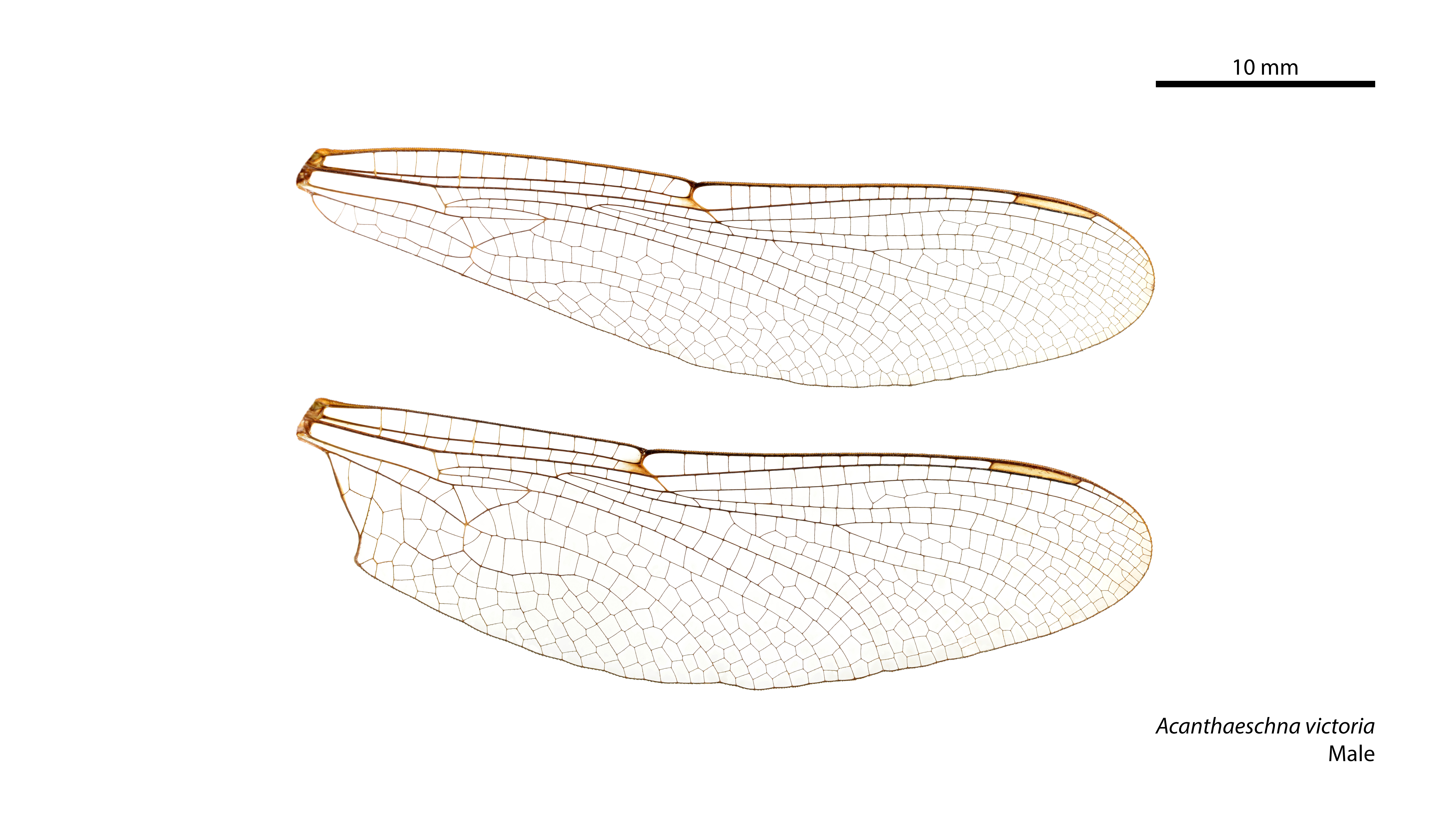
Male wings
