= Royal Hobart Show =

Annual event in Tasmania, Australia

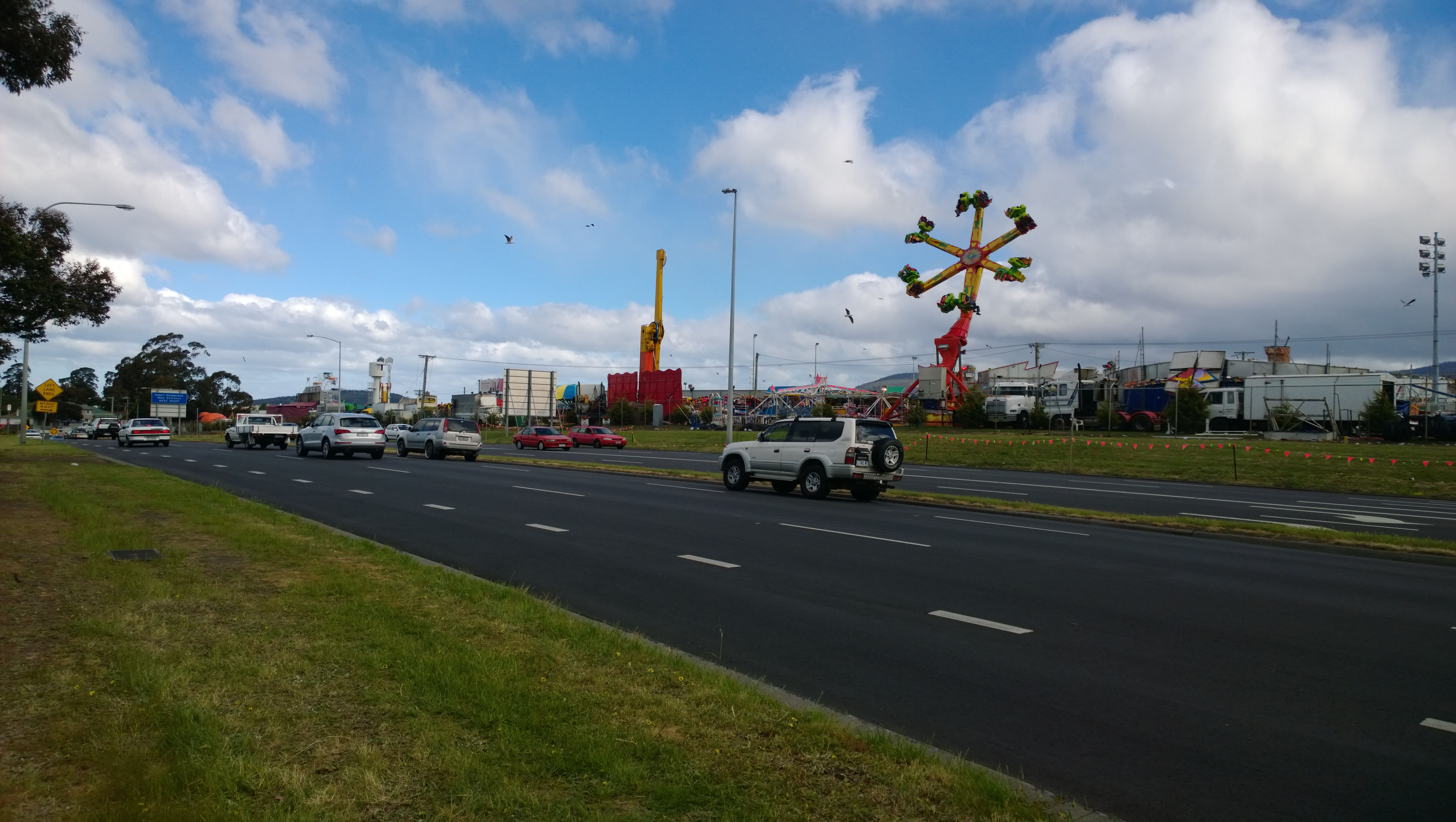
- The Royal Hobart Show from the Brooker Highway
- Also called: 'The Show'
- Observed by: Southern Tasmania
- Type: Southern public holiday
- Significance: Royal Agricultural Society of Tasmania
- Celebrations: Agricultural displays, sideshows, fashion parades
- Date: Wednesday through to Saturday, ending on the fourth Saturday in October
- Duration: 4 days
- Frequency: annual

The Royal Hobart Show is an annual event held in October at the Royal Showgrounds in Glenorchy, Tasmania, Australia. It is the largest of the Royal Shows held in cities and towns around the state by the Royal Agricultural Society of Tasmania. The event focuses on the rural exploits of Tasmanians with events such as livestock judging and wood chopping. Also popular at the event are show bags and rides.

The show runs for four days, Wednesday through to Saturday, ending on the fourth Saturday in October. The Thursday is a public holiday in the south of the Tasmania, known as Hobart Show Day. The Friday night traditionally has fireworks. The Saturday is known as family day and usually involves many discounts and savings on showbags and rides from the other days.

In many ways it can be considered similar (although smaller) to the Sydney Royal Easter Show.

== History ==
The first edition of the show was in 1822, and it was held near Salamanca Place.

The Great War cancelled the show from 1915 to 1918, and also 1940 to 1944 due to World War II.

At the 1968 show, stuntman Adrian Labans fell 50 feet (15.2 m) to his death from a high wire act.

In June 2020 that years show was cancelled due to restrictions caused by the COVID-19 pandemic in Australia.

== See also ==
- List of events in Tasmania
