= Cygnet Folk Festival =

Annual folk music festival in Tasmania, Australia

- Status: Active
- Genre: Folk festival
- Begins: 14 January 2022
- Ends: 16 January 2022
- Frequency: 2nd weekend in January
- Locations: Cygnet, Tasmania
- Coordinates: 43°09′00″S 147°04′12″E
- Country: Australia
- Years active: 44
- Inaugurated: January 1982
- Founder: The Huon Folk Inc Management Committee
- Previous event: 12 January 2024
- Next event: 10 January 2025
- Participants: 400–500 musicians
- Attendance: 6,000
- Leader: Huon Folk Inc
- Website: cygnetfolkfestival.org

The Cygnet Folk Festival, run since 1982, is a three-day folk music festival held in Cygnet in Tasmania, Australia, that occurs annually on the second weekend in January.

== History ==
The festival has developed as one of the premier cultural events in Tasmania's arts calendar. Every year on the second weekend in January, the small village of Cygnet, situated in the Huon Valley in the bay of Port Cygnet, presents a variety of music, dance, and related arts, over three days. Performances take place in the pubs, halls, cafes, churches, parks and streets of Cygnet. The festival allows for a range of concerts, workshops, master classes, poetry reading, youth awards, children's events, gourmet food stalls featuring local produce, sessions, arts and crafts market and dances. The program features an eclectic mix of artists including local Tasmanians, mainland Australians and international guests.

Some of the well-known festival headline acts over the years include Riley Lee, Afenginn, My Friend the Chocolate Cake, Stiff Gins, Zulya Kamalova, Rory McLeod and Frank Yamma.

The 2021 Festival was cancelled in May 2020 due to the COVID-19 pandemic in Australia. The 2022 Festival was scheduled for 14–16 January. It was to be the Festival's 40th anniversary, but after the spread of the Omicron variant of COVID-19, the festival was cancelled on 21 December 2021.

== See also ==
- List of events in Tasmania
