= Royal Agricultural Society of Tasmania =

The Royal Agricultural Society of Tasmania (RAST) is a Tasmanian Agricultural society based at the Hobart Showgrounds. The RAST organises many of the agricultural shows around Tasmania including the Royal Hobart Show. Originally called the “Van Diemen's Land Agricultural Society”, it was the first agricultural society formed in Australia. The society started in Hobart Town on 1 January 1822. The first show was conducted in January 1822, in the Old Market Place, just in front of the present State Parliament House. In 1922 His Majesty King George V approved the granting of the "Royal" prefix to the society, which in turn became known as the Royal Agricultural Society of Tasmania.

Annual elections of officers drew interest and participation from varying forms of agriculture over time.

It celebrated its 100th anniversary show in 2004.

== Publications ==
- Royal Show (Hobart, Tas.); Royal Agricultural Society of Tasmania (1900), Programme of events, Royal Agricultural Society of Tasmania
