= Offcutts =

Australian rock band

- Origin: Melbourne, Victoria, Australia
- Genres: Rock, pop, electronic
- Years active: 2002–2008
- Labels: Rubber/BMG, EMI
- Past members: see Members list below
- Website: MySpace

Offcutts were an Australian rock group formed in 2002 by mainstays Aram "Az" Cargill on guitar and Tommy Spender on lead vocals and bass guitar. Their music had high rotation on national youth radio, Triple J. They issued two albums, Thrift Shop Boutique (compilation album, 3 May 2004) and What Happened Don't Lie (March 2007), before disbanding in 2008.

== History ==
Offcutts were formed early in 2002 in Melbourne as a three-piece rock group, with Aram "Az" Cargill on guitar, Luke "Kano" Kane on drums and Dingo Spender (known as Tommy Spender ) on lead vocals and bass guitar. Their name acknowledges being the "offcuts" of other projects: they "grew from the ashes of other beats-based outfits and their DIY mentality had them boys swapping instruments, jamming with computers and recording the outcomes on MiniDisc." Spender listed his favourite Australian artists as Ross Hannaford, the Avalanches, the Necks and AC/DC. For live performances they added Manas Pandey on vocals.

Cargill and Spender had met on a work-for-the-dole course, Cargill recruited Spender on saxophone (ex-Murdoch) for his acid-jazz group, New World Souls. Spender later remembered, "my first proper band I played in was called Murdoch, kind of heavy math rock that I played saxophone over. Then New World Souls, which morphed into Offcutts. I also started a side project called The Sneaker Trio, which was with some best friends and such a highlight of my musical career." Cargill and Pandey were music students at North Metropolitan College of TAFE. After New World Souls had disbanded Cargill and Spender formed Offcutts. The group were influenced by a wide range of artists including the Beatles, Prince, James Brown, Daft Punk, and Mötley Crüe.

Offcutts combined elements of hip hop and beat poetry on their debut five-track extended play, Homestyles (25 February 2002), released on Rubber Records and distributed by the BMG label. Added to high rotation on national youth radio, Triple J, the lead track, "Hips", was an underground hit in Australia and was followed by the cross-over dance hit, "Everybody's Getting Back to the Music". Cargill explained the EP's launch being held at the group's home, "we wanted to do it in our own home. We had industry, friends, acquaintances and the odd free loader that we handed out an invite to on the road. I think we got like 500 people all up. We just wanted to have a party and put it in its environment rather than have it in a club."

Not satisfied though with the continued support from radio and a healthy growing audience, Offcutts made another genre shift and came back with their most successful pop single to date "Break It Down (James Brown)" off the Paper Bag / Plastic Bag twin EP release in August 2003. According to their label, "Plastic Bag is the electronic dance based music, aimed specifically at the dance floor" while "Paper Bag is the group incorporating guitars, bass, drums and rock n' roll." The Age's Andrew Drever felt that "the Paper Bag disc comprising rootsy rock tracks and the Plastic Bag set showcasing funked-up dance styles."

"Break It Down" was listed at No. 90 on the Triple J Hottest 100, 2003 by radio listeners. Bender described the track, "the song's actually about the feeling of rocking out. We've always made music like 'Break It', but I had no idea it was going to be played on (radio station) Nova or Video Hits. I just didn't want it to be a love song, but I didn't want it to be 'Rock'n'roll ain't dead' either. I wanted it to be a bit ambiguous, but also with raw sentiment, so people could just tune straight into it and go, 'I don't know what it means, but it rocks'." The band received international recognition when it was chosen as the theme music behind Sony PlayStation games and included in a major ad campaign screening during the American Super Bowl. "Break It Down (James Brown)" was selected for inclusion on the 2003 Triple J Hottest 100 compilation.

Their debut album, Thrift Shop Boutique, was released on 3 May 2004, which is a compilation of their "best musical moments to date. Featuring hits such as 'Break It (Down James Brown)', 'Hips' and the new single 'We Get' as well as 3 brand new tracks." In late 2004 Offcutts returned to the studio to work on their first studio album. In the meantime the group shared, with their fans, samplers via the release of advanced versions and rare collectables on a set of four EPs, The Singles Society, which spanned six months, starting in 2005. Radio stations added "The Lake", from the third instalment, to their play lists, which was critically acclaimed in the local press. Tracks by the group appeared on the soundtrack of the 2005 feature film, Aurora Borealis (starring Juliette Lewis and Donald Sutherland).

Offcutts decided to strip it all back for their full length offering, What Happened Don't Lie (March 2007). The lead single, "Stand Back" (October 2006), and the subsequent single, "Cold Morning Happiness", were added to Triple J's play list. The band split in late 2008.

Tom Spender issued a six-track EP, Modern Pest, under the name Spender in July 2013, which includes the track, "Hotel Home" with vocals by Gotye. Spender explained, "We recorded it two weeks before the release of 'Somebody That I Used to Know'. Literally, two weeks. I packed up my gear and said 'good luck, and I'll be in touch, speak to you soon'. And then he exploded. It's been an amazing journey following his rise."

Spender joined with Mama Kin to form Mama Kin Spender. They released their debut album Golden Magnetic in 2018 and it was nominated for the 2018 ARIA Award for Best blues and roots.

== Members ==
- Dingo Spender – lead vocals, bass guitar
- Aram Ion Tolner "Az" Cargill – lead guitar
- Luke "Kano" Kane – drums
- Manas Pandey – vocals, MC
- Yuri Ken Pavlinov – bass guitar

== Discography ==
=== Albums ===
- Thrift Shop Boutique (3 May 2004)
- What Happened Don't Lie (March 2007)

=== Extended plays ===
- Homestyle (25 February 2002)
- Plastic Bag / Paper Bag (August 2003) double EP
- Singles Society – Hub Cap (2005)
- Singles Society – Pole 2 Pole (September 2005)
- Singles Society – The Lake (December 2005)
- Singles Society – Diamond Bike (2005)

=== Singles ===
- "Break It Down (James Brown)"
- "Stand Back" (October 2006)

=== Compilations ===
- Thrift Shop Boutique
- Triple J Hottest 100, 2003
