= Phil K =

Australian DJ (1969–2020)

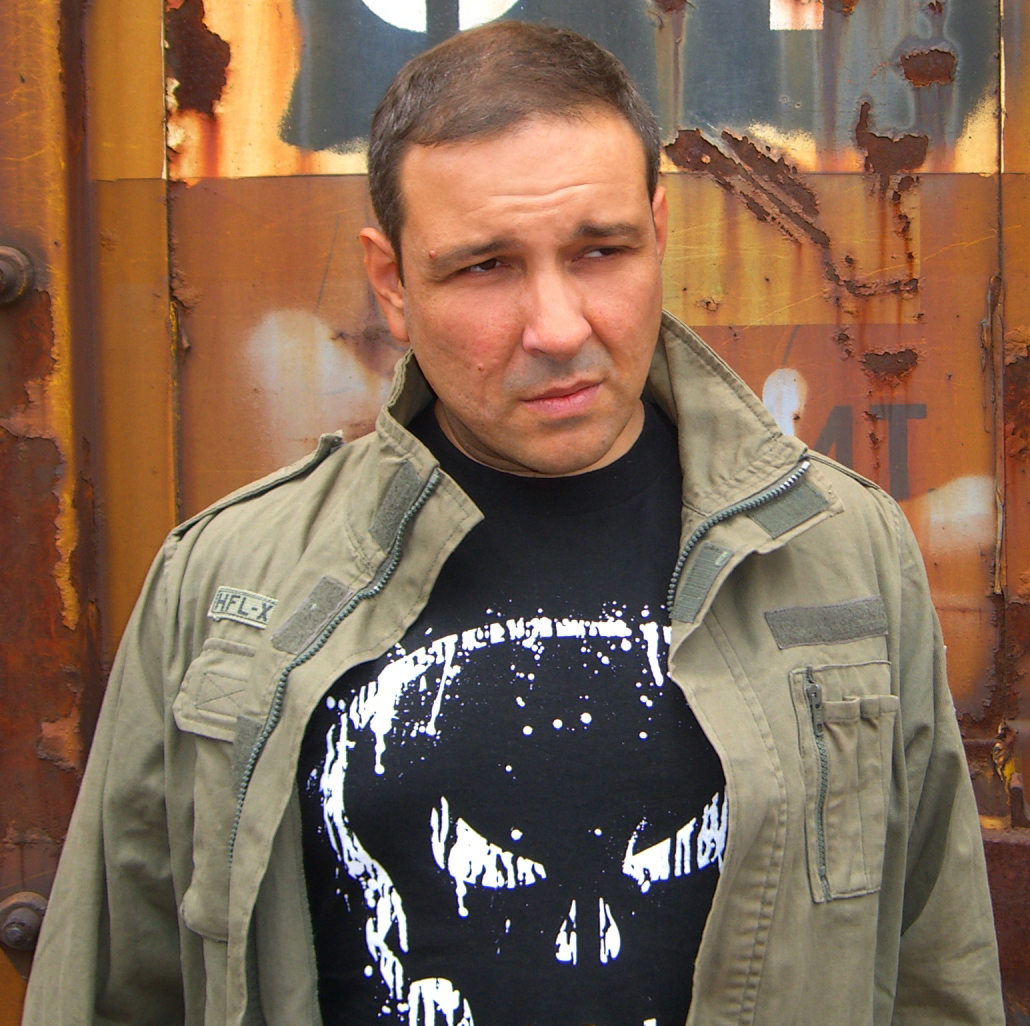
- Phil K in 2006

Background information
- Born: Phillip Krokidis; 6 May 1969
- Origin: Melbourne, Australia
- Died: 1 November 2020 (aged 51)
- Genres: Breakbeat
- Occupations: DJ, producer
- Website: philk.dj

Phillip Krokidis (6 May 1969 – 1 November 2020), known professionally as Phil K, was an Australian electronic music DJ and record producer from Melbourne. He was a member of the "Aussie breaks" music scene which also includes other Melbourne DJs such as Nubreed and Andy Page. In addition to DJing, Phil K also produced alongside Habersham and Dave Preston in The Operators and was also a member of Hi-Fi Bugs and Lostep. He was known primarily for his DJing of breakbeat music, but often weaved in other genres such as ambient, deep house, and techno and did not pigeonhole himself with a particular genre.

== Biography ==
Phil K started DJing in 1985, performing at his school's disco. He soon started working for a disco hire company setting up sound systems at venues. In the 1990s, Phil K worked for DMC, a seller of DJ gear and records. In 1996, Phil K released his first record, "Summer Breeze", as the Free Radicals with Andy Page and Ivan Gough. He co-founded a new label, Zero Tolerance Records, in 1998 with Page to release material by their duo, Hi-Fi Bugs. Now defunct, ZTR released electronic music from 1998 to 2004, releasing singles by artists such as Ivan Gough, Luke Chable, Hi-Fi Bugs, Andy Page and Gab Olivier.

In 2000, Phil K created his first commercial mix album for Global Recordings. The album won him the "Best Dance Compilation" award at the Dance Music Awards in 2001. His Kiss 100 "Friday Tapes" garnered him the award for "Best Radio Show". Phil K started working with fellow Australian Luke Chable and the two released "The Roots" on Boxed in 2002. After sending Sasha a demo of their next track, "Burma", he included it on the album Involver and the track was subsequently also released by GU Music. He also signed onto EQ/Stomp to mix the fourth entry in the Balance series. Balance 004 is a two disc release consisting of a "Breaks Mix" and a "House Mix" and won Phil K the 2003 DMA award for "Best Mix CD".

In 2005, Distinct'ive Breaks Records released Phil K's entry in the Y4k series and features a combination of melodic breaks, bassy techno and glitchy electro. The mix album featured "Cloudbrake", a "tech-edged" bass driven breakbeat track written by Phil K and Habersham. In 2006, Phil K and Chable as Lostep released Because We Can. The album combines emotive breakbeats and dirty electro rhythms with strange synths and samples.

On 1 November 2020, Phil K died of prostate cancer, aged 51.

== Technology ==
With Pioneer, Phil K developed a prototype for the DVJ-X1, the first visual and audio live mixer. Unlike some other DJs, Phil K did not hold vinyl "sacred" and enjoyed using newer digital technologies due to their flexibility.

== Selected discography ==
Singles

- 1996: Free Radicals - "Summer Breeze" (DanceNET)
- 2000: Hi-Fi Bugs - "Lydian & The Dinosaur" (Zero Tolerance Records)
- 2002: "Bushpig" (Super Charged)
- 2002: Lostep - "The Roots" (Boxed)
- 2004: Lostep - "Burma" (GU Music)
- 2004: The Operators - "Furball" (Lobotomy Records)
- 2005: "Cloudbrake" with Habersham (Audio Therapy)
- 2005: "They Just Won't Let Me Be" (Institution Recordings)

Albums

- 2000: Sound Not Scene (Global Recordings)
- 2002: Balance 004: Phil K (EQ/Stomp)
- 2003: Retro>Future (Functional Breaks)
- 2004: Renaissance Presents The Therapy Sessions: Dave Seaman & Phil K (Renaissance)
- 2005: Phil K Presents: Y4K (Distinct'ive Breaks Records)
- 2006: Lostep - Because We Can (GU Music)
- 2007: Hi Fi (Central Station)

Remixes

- Shpongle - "Dorset Perception" (Lostep's Balearic Breaks Re-Edit)
