= Special Patrol =

Iranian television series

- Genre: Police Action
- Screenplay by: Tala Motazedi Sadeq Khosh'hal
- Directed by: Mehdi Rahmani
- Opening theme: Babak Mirza-Khani
- Ending theme: Mohammad Motamedi
- Country of origin: Iran
- Original language: Persian
- No. of seasons: 1
- No. of episodes: 10

Production
- Producer: Saeed Sadi
- Cinematography: Mohamad Rasuli Mehdi Rezaei
- Editor: Mehdi Sadi

Original release
- Network: IRIB TV1 iFilm
- Release: 2016

Special Patrol (Persian: گشت ویژه; Gashteh Vizheh) is an Iranian television series written by Tala Motazedi and Sadeq Khosh'hal and directed by Mehdi Rahmani. The series was produced in 2016 and consists of ten episodes.

== Plot Summary ==
The subject of this television series revolves around the missions of a skilled and experienced police unit that confronts various criminal cases, working to face and resolve them. The characters of the series consist of several young officers who serve as patrol units. While on duty in the city, they encounter an incident and proceed to investigate it...

== Main Cast ==
- Hamid Gudarzi
- Shahed Ahmadlu
- Pedram Sharifi
- Mahmoud Pak Niat
- Amir Kazemi
- Ehsan Bayat-Far
