= NuBreed =

- Origin: Australia
- Years active: 2000-present
- Labels: Zero Tolerance Recordings; Distinct'ive Breaks Records; Mob Records
- Members: Jason Catherine Michael Walburgh Danny Bonnici

NuBreed is a trio of Australian record producers Jason Catherine, Michael Walburgh, and Danny Bonnici (vocalist). They have performed several remixes for artists such as The Crystal Method, Luke Chable, and Way Out West. They have also recorded several DJ mixes including Electric_02 for EQ Recordings and an entry in Distinct'ive Breaks Records' Y4k series. Their singles are most often released on Zero Tolerance Recordings and Mob Records.

== Discography ==
=== Studio albums ===
List of albums, with selected details
Title	Album details
The Original	Released: 2003; Label: Mob Records (MOBCD9003); Formats: CD

== Awards ==
=== ARIA Music Awards ===
The ARIA Music Awards is an annual awards ceremony that recognises excellence, innovation, and achievement across all genres of Australian music. They commenced in 1987. NuBreed were nominated for one award.

Year	Nominee / work	Award	Result
2004	The Original	Best Dance Release	Nominated
