= Groovin' the Moo =

Annual music festival in Australia

Groovin the Moo
- Genre: Australian, Rock, Alternative Rock, Indie Rock, Hip-hop, Electronic, Metalcore
- Dates: Late April – Early May
- Locations: Australia: Gloucester, New South Wales (2005); Narrandera, New South Wales (2005); Maitland, New South Wales (2006–2019, 2022–2023); Albury, New South Wales (2006–2007); Darwin, Northern Territory (2006); Townsville, Queensland (2008–2019); Bendigo, Victoria (2009–2019, 2022–2023); Canberra, Australian Capital Territory (2010–2019, 2022–2023); Bunbury, Western Australia (2010–2019, 2023); Oakbank, South Australia (2014–2016); Wayville, South Australia (2017–2019, 2023); Sunshine Coast, Queensland (2023); Lismore, New South Wales (2026-)
- Years active: 2005–2019, 2022–2023, 2026-
- Founders: Cattleyard Promotions
- Website: www.gtm.net.au

Groovin the Moo is an annual music festival that was held primarily in regional centres across Australia. The festival was held during autumn, typically in May of each year.

Groovin the Moo was established by Cattleyard Promotions and their first festival was held on Sunday 24 April 2005 in Gloucester, New South Wales. The festivals were held each year until 2019, but in 2020 and 2021 there were no festivals because of the COVID-19 pandemic.

Groovin the Moo returned in 2022 and 2023, but insufficient ticket sales led to the cancellation of the 2024 festival, before it returned in 2026 as a scaled-down single festival date in order to have a sustainable regrowth.

== History ==
The first incarnation of the festival occurred on 24 April 2005 at the Gloucester Showgrounds in New South Wales with crowds of over 1400, continuing to Narrandera (NSW Riverina) with crowds exceeding 1800. The following year the festival took place in Maitland, Albury and Darwin.

2007 was a break-through year for the festival, with headlining Australian act Silverchair and successful international act The Black Keys headlining, along with the largely popular Hilltop Hoods, John Butler Trio and You Am I. In 2008 Townsville was added to the tour's circuit, with Bendigo being added the following year.

2010 saw the inclusion of Bunbury and Canberra, with all shows selling out across the country.

In 2014, an Oakbank show was added to the tour and went on to sell out.

Australia's first pill testing trial was held at the 2018 festival in Canberra.

In 2020, and 2021, festivals were not held because of restrictions resulting from the COVID-19 pandemic in Australia. Tickets purchased for 2020 were valid for the event in 2022.

The 2024 and 2025 festivals did not go ahead; the former due to poor ticket sales and the latter due to financial concerns.

=== Festivals venues ===
City	State/Territory	Venue	Festivals
Albury	NSW	Albury Racecourse	2006–2007
Bendigo	VIC	Prince of Wales Showground	2009–2019, 2022–2023
Bunbury	WA	Hay Park	2010–2019, 2023
Canberra	ACT	University of Canberra (2010–2018); Exhibition Park (2019, 2022–2023)	2010–2019, 2022–2023
Darwin	NT	Darwin Amphitheatre	2006
Gloucester	NSW	Gloucester Showground	2005
Maitland	NSW	Maitland Showground	2006–2019, 2022–2023
Narrandera	NSW	Narrandera Showground	2005
Oakbank	SA	Oakbank Racecourse	2014–2016
Townsville	QLD	Lou Litster Park (2008–2009); Murray Sporting Complex (2010–2019, 2022–2023)	2008–2019
Wayville	SA	Adelaide Showground	2017–2019, 2023
Sunshine Coast	QLD	Kawana Sports Western Precinct	2023
Lismore	NSW	Oakes Oval	2026-

== Lineups year by year ==
As listed on the official website. Bold indicates headline act. All acts are Australian unless stated otherwise.

=== 2005 ===
Artist	Gloucester Sunday, 24 April	Narrandera Saturday, 22 October
**Screaming Jets**	Yes	No
Killing Heidi	Yes	No
Evermore	Yes	No
The Spazzys	Yes	No
Sender	Yes	No
Supersonic	Yes	No
Retro Rockets	Yes	No
Solver	Yes	No
Dirty Pink Jeans	Yes	No
The Common Code	Yes	No
Halo	Yes	No
Bullshit Rare	Yes	No
**Grinspoon**	No	Yes
Spiderbait	No	Yes
The Pictures	No	Yes
Sarah McLeod	No	Yes
Neon	No	Yes
Star Assassin	No	Yes
Local Knowledge (NZ)	No	Yes

Notes

- The Narrandera show was also known by some sources as "Groovin the Moo 2". While www.GTM.net.au still references the Narrandera show as taking place under the "ABOUT GTM" section, it is not referenced under the "PAST LINEUPS" section bringing into question the official status of this show today.

=== 2006 ===
	Maitland Saturday, 29 April	Darwin Saturday, 26 August	Albury Saturday, 25 November
**Hilltop Hoods**	Yes	No	Yes
Shihad	Yes	No	No
End of Fashion	Yes	No	No
The Herd	Yes	No	No
Faker	Yes	No	No
Clare Bowditch and the Feeding Set	Yes	No	No
The Vasco Era	Yes	No	No
True Live	Yes	Yes	Yes
Modular Lounge	Yes	No	No
Local Knowledge (NZ)	Yes	No	No
Bullshit Rare	Yes	Yes	Yes
**Gomez** (UK)	No	Yes	No
Youth Group	No	Yes	Yes
Augie March	No	Yes	No
The Mess Hall	No	Yes	No
The Drones	No	Yes	No
Ash Grunwald	No	Yes	No
John Butler Trio	No	No	Yes
You Am I	No	No	Yes
The Fumes	No	No	Yes
The Exploders	No	No	Yes
The Audreys	No	No	Yes
Trail Kennedy	No	No	Yes
Star Assassin	No	No	Yes

Notes

- "Gomez", from the United Kingdom, is credited as the first international act to appear at Groovin The Moo on www.GTM.net.au. However "Local Knowledge", from New Zealand, played twice before "Gomez" first appearance, once in 2005 & once in 2006.

=== 2007 ===
	Maitland ^{[A]}	Albury ^{[B]}
**Silverchair**	Yes	No
The Black Keys (US)	Yes	No
You Am I	Yes	No
The Presets	Yes	No
Sneaky Sound System	Yes	Yes
Midnight Juggernauts	Yes	Yes
Airborne	Yes	Yes
The Morning After Girls	Yes	No
Mia Dyson	Yes	Yes
Macromantics	Yes	No
Kid Confucius	Yes	Yes
The Camels	Yes	No
Snowman	Yes	No
2 Dogs DJs	Yes	No
Trial Kennedy	Yes	No
Astronomy Class	Yes	Yes
Tongue and Diaz	Yes	No
Radical Son	Yes	No
Hermitude	Yes	Yes
Good Buddha	Yes	No
Mister Savona	Yes	No
The Porkers	Yes	No
**Grinspoon**	No	Yes
Xavier Rudd	No	Yes
Blue King Brown	No	Yes
Clare Bowditch and The Feeding Set	No	Yes
The Bamboos	No	Yes
Mammal	No	Yes
Horsell Common	No	Yes
Third Estate	No	Yes
Urthboy	No	Yes
The Tongue	No	Yes
Mista Savona	No	Yes
Unkle Ho	No	Yes
Combat Wombat	No	Yes
Diafrix	No	Yes

Notes

- **A** Maitland Showground 12 May.
- **B** Albury Racecourse 24 November.

=== 2008 ===
	Maitland ^{[A]}	Townsville ^{[B]}
**The Presets**	Yes	Yes
Sneaky Sound System	Yes	Yes
The Herd	Yes	Yes
Spiderbait	Yes	Yes
Gyroscope	Yes	Yes
Karnivool	Yes	Yes
Custom Kings	Yes	Yes
The Galvatrons	Yes	No
Little Red	Yes	No
Katalyst	Yes	Yes
The Potbelleez	Yes	Yes
Azzido Da Bass **(GER)**	Yes	Yes
Pitch Black **(NZ)**	Yes	No
Bass Kleph	Yes	Yes
Dirty Laundry	Yes	No
Mark Dynamix	Yes	No
Hercules in NY	Yes	No
Amber Savage	Yes	Yes
That 1 Guy **(USA)**	No	Yes
Resin Dogs Sound System	No	Yes
The Last Kinection	Yes	No
Beats Working	Yes	No
The Middle East	No	Yes
Lover	No	Yes

Notes

- **A** Maitland Showground 26 April.
- **B** Lou Lister Park 3 May.

=== 2009 ===
- The Living End
- Hilltop Hoods
- The Grates
- De La Soul **(USA)**
- Architecture in Helsinki
- Little Birdy
- Muscles (DJ Set)
- Infusion
- Okkervil River **(USA)**
- Ratatat **(USA)**
- The Drones
- Van She
- Tame Impala
- Miami Horror (Live)
- The Twelves **(Brazil)**
- Horrorshow
- Christer **(CAN)**
- Hercules in NY
- Art vs. Science
- My Own Enemy - Pushover Winner

- 2 May 2009 – Lou Litster Park, Townsville.
- 9 May 2009 – Maitland Showground, Maitland.
- 16 May 2009 – Prince of Wales Showground's, Bendigo.

=== 2010 ===
- Vampire Weekend **(USA)**
- **Silverchair**
- Empire of the Sun
- Grinspoon
- Tegan and Sara **(CAN)**
- Spoon **(USA)**
- British India
- Lisa Mitchell
- Miami Horror
- Kisschasy
- Bag Raiders
- Kid Koala presents The Slew Live **(CAN)**
- Muph and Plutonic
- Funkoars
- Space Invadas Illy
- Ajax
- Jonathan Boulet
- **Yacht Club DJs**
- Killaqueens
- The Only

- Saturday 1 May, Bendigo, Prince of Wales Showground.
- Sunday 2 May, Townsville, Murray Sporting Complex – Townsville Cricket Grounds.
- Saturday 8 May, Maitland, Maitland Showground.
- Sunday 9 May, Canberra, The Meadows, University of Canberra.
- Saturday 15 May, Bunbury, Hay Park.

=== 2011 ===
- 360 (Bunbury only)
- AC Slater **(USA)**
- Art vs. Science
- Architecture in Helsinki
- The Aston Shuffle
- Birds of Tokyo
- Bliss n Eso
- Boy & Bear (Bunbury only)
- **Cut Copy**
- Darwin Deez **(USA)**
- Datarock **(NOR)**
- **Drapht**
- The Drums **(USA)**
- The Go! Team **(UK)**
- Gotye
- Gyroscope
- The Holidays
- Horrorshow
- House of Pain **(USA)**
- The Jezabels
- Nina Las Vegas Triple J
- Sampology AV/DJ Set
- Unkle-Live **(UK)**
- Washington
- The Wombats **(UK)**
  - The Wombats and The Holidays pulled out of the Bunbury show due to overseas commitments. They were replaced by Boy & Bear along with 360 and Pez.

- Sat 30 April, Prince of Wales Showground, Bendigo.
- Sun 1 May, Townsville Cricket Grounds, Townsville.
- Sat 7 May, Maitland Showground, Maitland.
- Sun 8 May, The Meadows, University of Canberra.
- Sat 14 May, Hay Park, Bunbury.

=== 2012 ===
- 360
- Adrian Lux **(SWE)**
- Andrew WK **(USA)** One Man Party Tour
- Ball Park Music
- Beni
- Big Scary
- Bluejuice
- ~~Chiddy Bang **(USA)**~~
- City and Colour **(CAN)**
- **Digitalism** **(GER)**
- The Getaway Plan
- Gold Fields
- Hermitude
- Hilltop Hoods
- **Kaiser Chiefs** **(UK)**
- Kimbra
- The Maccabees **(UK)**
- Matt Corby
- Muscles
- Mutemath **(USA)**
- Naysayer & Gilsun
- Parkway Drive
- Public Enemy **(USA)**
- Purple Sneakers DJs
- San Cisco
- Wavves **(USA)**

Local band Juwana opened the moo tent after winning competition

  - Ball Park Music replaced Chiddy Bang, who withdrew from the lineup so they could focus on promoting their (at the time) upcoming album.

- Sat 5 May, Prince of Wales Showground, Bendigo.
- Sun 6 May, Murray Sporting Complex, Townsville.
- Sat 12 May, Maitland Showground, Maitland.
- Sun 13 May, The Meadows, Canberra.
- Sat 19 May, Hay Park, Bunbury.

=== 2013 ===
- Allday (Bunbury only)
- Alison Wonderland
- Alpine
- The Amity Affliction
- The Bronx **(USA)**
- DZ Deathrays (DJ Set)
- **Example** **(UK)**
- Flume
- Frightened Rabbit **(UK)**
- Hungry Kids of Hungary
- The Kooks **(UK)**
- Last Dinosaurs
- Matt & Kim **(USA)**
- Midnight Juggernauts
- Pez
- Regurgitator
- Seth Sentry
- ShockOne
- Tame Impala
- Tegan and Sara **(CAN)**
- **The Temper Trap**
- They Might Be Giants **(USA)**
- Tuka With Ellesquire
- Urthboy
- DJ Woody's Big Phat 90's Mixtape **(UK)**
- Yacht **(USA)**
- Yolanda Be Cool
  - During Pez's performance at the Bunbury show, 360 came on stage and performed "The Festival Song"
  - Urthboy pulled out of the Bunbury show due to illness and was replaced with Allday

- Sat 27 Apr, Maitland Showground, Maitland.
- Sun 28 Apr, University of Canberra, Canberra.
- Sat 4 May, Prince of Wales Showground, Bendigo.
- Sun 5 May, Murray Sporting Complex, Townsville.
- Sat 11 May, Hay Park, Bunbury.

=== 2014 ===
- ~~Action Bronson **(USA)**~~
- Andy Bull
- Allday
- Architecture in Helsinki
- Cults **(USA)**
- **Disclosure** **(UK)**
- Dizzee Rascal **(UK)**
- Holy F**K **(CAN)**
- Illy
- The Jezabels
- The Jungle Giants
- Karnivool
- Kingswood
- The Kite String Tangle
- Loon Lake
- The Naked and Famous **(NZ)**
- Parkway Drive
- Peking Duk
- **The Presets**
- Robert Delong **(USA)**
- Thundamentals
- Vance Joy
- Violent Soho
- Wave Racer
- What So Not
  - Action Bronson cancelled his appearance at GTM 2014 due to ""unforeseen circumstances regarding recording commitments" and was replaced by Allday

- Friday, 25 April, Oakbank Racecourse, Oakbank.
- Saturday, 26 April, Maitland Showground, Maitland.
- Sunday, 27 April, University of Canberra.
- Saturday, 3 May, Prince of Wales Showground, Bendigo.
- Sunday, 4 May, Murray Sporting Complex, Townsville.
- Saturday, 10 May, Hay Park, Bunbury.

=== 2015 ===
- ASAP Ferg **(USA)**
- Ball Park Music
- Broods **(NZ)**
- Carmada
- Charli XCX **(UK)**
- The Delta Riggs
- DMA's
- **Flight Facilities**
- Hermitude
- **Hilltop Hoods**
- Hot Dub Time Machine
- Meg Mac
- Northlane
- One Day
- Peace **(UK)**
- Peaches **(CAN)**
- The Preatures
- RL Grime **(USA)**
- San Cisco
- Saskwatch
- Sticky Fingers
- Tkay Maidza
- Wolfmother
- You Me at Six **(UK)**

- Saturday 25 April, Oakbank Racecourse, Oakbank.
- Sunday 26 April, Hay Park, Bunbury.
- Saturday 2 May, Prince of Wales Showground, Bendigo.
- Sunday 3 May, University of Canberra, Canberra.
- Saturday 9 May, Maitland Showground, Maitland.
- Sunday 10 May, Murray Sports Complex, Townsville.

=== 2016 ===
- **Alison Wonderland**
- Boo Seeka
- Boy & Bear
- British India
- Client Liaison
- Danny Brown **(USA)**
- Drapht
- DZ Deathrays
- Emma Louise
- Golden Features
- Harts
- In Hearts Wake
- Illy
- Jarryd James
- MS MR **(USA)**
- ~~Mutemath **(USA)**~~
- Ngaiire
- Odesza **(USA)**
- Of Monsters and Men **(ISL)** (Bunbury only)
- **Ratatat** **(USA)**
- REMI
- The Rubens
- Safia
- Twenty One Pilots **(USA)**
- Vallis Alps
- ~~Vic Mensa **(USA)**~~
- What So Not
  - Mutemath and Vic Mensa cancelled their appearances at GTM 2016 for unspecified reasons and were replaced by Jarryd James and What So Not
  - Of Monsters and Men were added to the lineup, but only for the Bunbury show

- Saturday, 23 April, Maitland Showground, Maitland.
- Sunday, 24 April, University of Canberra, Canberra.
- Monday, 25 April, Oakbank Racecourse, Oakbank.
- Saturday, 30 April, Bendigo's Prince of Wales Showground, Bendigo.
- Sunday, 1 May, Townsville Cricket Grounds, Townsville.
- Saturday, 7 May, Hay Park, Bunbury.

=== 2017 ===
- Against Me! **(USA)**
- Allday
- Amy Shark
- Architects **(UK)**
- The Darkness **(UK)**
- **Dillon Francis** **(USA)**
- ~~DRAM **(USA)**~~
- George Maple
- Hayden James
- The Jungle Giants
- K.Flay **(USA)**
- L-FRESH the Lion
- Loyle Carner **(UK)**
- Methyl Ethel
- Milky Chance **(GER)**
- Montaigne
- Northeast Party House
- Pnau
- Slumberjack
- The Smith Street Band
- Snakehips **(UK)**
- Tash Sultana
- Thundamentals
- **Violent Soho**
- The Wombats **(UK)**
  - DRAM was originally announced to play GTM 2017, however he cancelled his appearance before the full lineup was announced for unknown reasons.
  - Tash Sultana cancelled her sets at the Maitland and Bendigo shows due to illness. She was replaced by Amy Shark in Bendigo.
  - Montaigne cancelled her set the Bendigo show due to illness. It is unknown who her replacement was.

- Friday 28 April, Adelaide Showground, Wayville (SA).
- Saturday 29 April, Maitland Showground, Maitland (NSW).
- Sunday 30 April, Murray Sports Complex, Townsville (QLD).
- Saturday 6 May, Bendigo's Prince of Wales Showground, Bendigo (VIC).
- Sunday 7 May, University of Canberra, Bruce (ACT).
- Saturday 13 May, Hay Park, Bunbury (WA).

=== 2018 ===
- Alex Lahey
- Aminé **(USA)**
- The Amity Affliction
- Baker Boy
- **Ball Park Music**
- Claptone **(GER)**
- Confidence Man
- Cosmo's Midnight
- Dean Lewis
- Duckwrth **(USA)** (Bunbury only)
- Duke Dumont **(UK)**
- **Flight Facilities**
- Grinspoon
- Lady Leshurr **(UK)**
- Mallrat
- N.W.A.'s DJ Yella ft. Playboy T **(USA)**
- Ocean Alley
- Paul Kelly
- Portugal. The Man **(USA)**
- Public Service Broadcasting **(UK)**
- Royal Blood **(UK)**
- Sampa the Great
- Skegss
- ~~SuperDuperKyle **(USA)**~~
- Tkay Maidza
- Vera Blue
- Winston Surfshirt
  - SuperDuperKyle cancelled his appearance at GTM 2018 due to changes in his album scheduling and was replaced by DJ Yella ft. Playboy T
  - Duckwrth was added to the lineup, but only for the Bunbury show

- Friday 27 April, Adelaide Showground, Wayville (SA)
- Saturday 28 April, Maitland Showground, Maitland (NSW)
- Sunday 29 April, University of Canberra, Bruce (ACT)
- Saturday 5 May, Bendigo's Prince of Wales Showground, Bendigo (VIC)
- Sunday 6 May, Murray Sports Complex, Townsville (QLD)
- Saturday 12 May, Hay Park, Bunbury (WA)

=== 2019 ===
- A$AP Twelvyy **(USA)**
- Angie McMahon
- Aurora **(NOR)**
- Billie Eilish **(USA)**
- Carmouflage Rose
- Coolio **(USA)**
- Crooked Colours
- DMA's
- Duckwrth **(USA)**
- Fisher
- **Flosstradamus** **(USA)**
- G Flip
- Haiku Hands
- **Hermitude**
- Hilltop Hoods
- Holy Holy
- Jack River
- Jimothy **(UK)**
- Just A Gent
- MØ **(DNK)**
- Nick Murphy
- Nicole Millar
- Regurgitator
- Rejjie Snow **(IRL)**
- ShockOne (Bunbury only)
- Sofi Tukker **(USA)**
- Spinderella **(USA)**
- Thelma Plum
- ~~Tokimonsta **(USA)**~~
- Trophy Eyes
- Wafia
  - Tokimonsta cancelled her appearance at GTM 2019 for unspecified reasons and was replaced by Wafia and Jimothy.
  - Fisher did not appear in Bunbury and was replaced with ShockOne.

- Friday 26 April, Adelaide Showground, Wayville (SA)
- Saturday 27 April, Maitland Showground, Maitland (NSW)
- Sunday 28 April, Exhibition Park, Canberra (ACT)
- Saturday 4 May, Bendigo's Prince of Wales Showground, Bendigo (VIC)
- Sunday 5 May, Murray Sports Complex, Townsville (QLD)
- Saturday 11 May, Hay Park, Bunbury (WA)

=== 2020 ===
The 2020 festival was cancelled due to a ban on gatherings of more than 500 people as well as international borders being closed to non-citizens in relation to the COVID-19 pandemic in Australia

- AJ Tracey **(UK)**
- Bhad Bhabie **(USA)**
- Blanco Brown **(USA)**
- The Cat Empire
- Channel Tres **(USA)**
- Clairo **(USA)**
- Darude **(FIN)**
- Dope Lemon
- E^ST
- Gang of Youths
- Hayden James
- Kelis **(USA)**
- Kira Puru
- Mallrat
- Manu Crooks
- Maxo Kream **(USA)**
- Ruby Fields
- San Cisco
- Slowly Slowly
- Sugarhill Gang **(USA)**
- Supergrass **(UK)**
- Tones and I
- The Veronicas
- Waax
- YBN Cordae **(USA)**

- Friday 24 April, Adelaide Showground, Wayville (SA)
- Saturday 25 April, Exhibition Park, Canberra (ACT)
- Sunday 26 April, Hay Park, Bunbury (WA)
- Saturday 2 May, Bendigo's Prince of Wales Showground, Bendigo (VIC)
- Sunday 3 May, Murray Sports Complex, Townsville (QLD)
- Saturday 9 May, Maitland Showground, Maitland (NSW)

=== 2022 ===
The festival returned in 2022 after the 2020 and 2021 festivals were cancelled, however the Townsville, Bunbury, and Wayville legs did not go ahead due to uncertainty regarding crowd capacity and national/international travel restrictions related to the COVID-19 pandemic in Australia

- Alice Ivy
- Broods **(NZ)**
- CHAII **(NZ)**
- Grentperez
- Hilltop Hoods
- Hockey Dad
- Hope D
- ~~HP Boyz~~
- Jesswar
- JK-47
- Lime Cordiale
- Mashd N Kutcher
- Masked Wolf
- Middle Kids
- ~~Milky Chance **(GER)**~~
- Montaigne
- **Peking Duk**
- Polaris
- RedHook
- **Riton** **(UK)**
- Shouse
- Snakehips **(UK)**
- Spiderbait
- Sycco
- Thomas Headon **(UK)**
- Wolf Alice **(UK)**
  - Milky Chance cancelled their appearance at GTM 2022 due to travel issues related to the COVID-19 pandemic in Europe and were replaced by Lime Cordiale
  - HP Boyz cancelled their appearance at GTM 2022 for unspecified reasons and were replaced by grentperez
  - Illy joined Mashd N Kutcher onstage during the Bendigo leg

- Saturday 23 April, Maitland Showground, Maitland (NSW)
- Sunday 24 April, Exhibition Park, Canberra (ACT)
- Saturday 30 April, Bendigo's Prince Of Wales Showground, Bendigo (VIC)

=== 2023 ===
The 2023 festival returned to its full 6 day touring schedule, however the Townsville leg was dropped due to "logistical and financial difficulties" related to the COVID-19 pandemic in Australia and a Sunshine Coast leg was added as a replacement

- **Alt-J** **(UK)**
- Amy Shark
- Ball Park Music
- Barkaa
- bbno$ **(CAN)**
- The Chats
- Choomba
- Confidence Man
- Denzel Curry **(USA)**
- DICE (Bunbury only)
- Eliza Rose **(UK)**
- **Fatboy Slim** **(UK)**
- Genesis Owusu
- Hilltop Hoods (Bunbury only)
- Laurel **(UK)**
- Luude
- Nothing But Thieves **(UK)**
- Ocean Alley
- ~~Omar Apollo **(USA)**~~
- Royel Otis
- Skegss
- ~~Skepta **(UK)**~~
- Slayyyter **(USA)**
- Slowly Slowly
- Sophie May **(UK)**
- Teen Jesus and the Jean Teasers
- Teenage Dads
- Teenage Joans
  - Omar Apollo and Skepta cancelled their appearances at GTM 2023 for unspecified reasons and were replaced by Nothing But Thieves and Genesis Owusu
  - bbno$ and Genesis Owusu cancelled their appearances at the Bunbury show for unknown reasons and were replaced by Hilltop Hoods and Dice

- Friday 21 April, Adelaide Showground, Wayville (SA)
- Saturday 22 April, Maitland Showground, Maitland (NSW)
- Sunday 23 April, Exhibition Park, Canberra (ACT)
- Saturday 29 April, Prince of Wales Showground, Bendigo (VIC)
- Sunday 30 April, Kawana Sports Western Precinct, Sunshine Coast (QLD)
- Saturday 6 May, Hay Park, Bunbury (WA)

=== 2024 ===
The 2024 festival was cancelled, with the organisers citing "insufficient ticket sales".

Prior to cancellation, it had been announced that the Maitland leg of the 2024 festival was to be moved to Newcastle due to "consistent patron feedback and consultation regarding their transport and accommodation needs”, and the Sunshine Coast leg was moved to a bigger venue due to the sell-out of its 2023 debut.

- Alison Wonderland
- Armani White **(USA)**
- The Beaches **(CAN)**
- Claire Rosinkranz **(USA)**
- DMA's
- The Grogans
- GZA (Wu-Tang) & The Phunky Nomads **(USA)**
- Hot Dub Time Machine
- Jacotené
- Jessie Reyez **(CAN)**
- Jet
- The Jungle Giants
- Kenya Grace **(UK)**
- King Stingray
- The Kooks **(UK)**
- Mallrat
- Meduza **(ITA)**
- Melanie C DJ Set **(UK)**
- Mura Masa DJ Set **(UK)**
- Nerve & Friends (ECB & Cloe Terare)
- The Rions
- San Cisco
- Stephen Sanchez **(USA)**

- Thursday 25 April, Adelaide Showground, Wayville (SA)
- Friday 26 April, Exhibition Park, Canberra (ACT)
- Saturday 27 April, Prince of Wales Showground, Bendigo (VIC)
- Saturday 4 May, Foreshore Park, Newcastle (NSW)
- Sunday 5 May, Stadium Precinct, Sunshine Coast (QLD)
- Saturday 11 May, Hay Park, Bunbury (WA)

=== 2026 ===
The 2026 festival was held as part of the annual Great Southern Night and was reduced to a smaller single stage event.

- Baker Boy
- **Denzel Curry** **(USA)**
- Dope Lemon
- Maple's Pet Dinosaur
- Matt Corby
- Ninajirachi
- The Chats
- The Terrys
- Tones and I

- Saturday 9 May, Oakes Oval, Lismore (NSW)

== THE PLOT ==
THE PLOT
- Genre: Electronic, Dance, Indie Rock
- Dates: November / December
- Locations: Australia: Sydney New South Wales (2013; 2015–); Melbourne, Victoria (2013)
- Years active: 2013; 2015–2017
- Founders: Cattleyard Promotions
- Website: www.ThePlot.co

Established in 2013 by parent company Cattleyard Promotions, THE PLOT is a sister music festival to Groovin the Moo which focuses more on emerging and breaking Australian musicians. Launched on 16 September and to date all of events have been held in metropolitan cities, unlike "Groovin the Moo" which is held in various regional centres across Australia.

=== 2013 ===
Bold indicates headline act.

	Sydney ^{[A]}	Melbourne ^{[B]}
**Alison Wonderland (DJ Set)**	Yes	Yes
Miami Horror	Yes	Yes
DJ Snake (FRE)	Yes	Yes
Naysayer & Gilsun (AV Set)	Yes	Yes
Touch Sensitive	Yes	Yes
Wave Racer	Yes	Yes
Remi	Yes	Yes
Tyler Touche	Yes	Yes
Gold Fields	Yes	Yes
Yolanda Be Cool	Yes	Yes
Citizen Kay	Yes	Yes
Hayden James	Yes	Yes
Purple Sneakers	Yes	Yes
Elizabeth Rose	Yes	Yes
Willow Beats	Yes	Yes
Indian Summer	Yes	Yes
Beni	Yes	Yes
Wordlife (Live)	Yes	Yes
Softwar	Yes	Yes
Club Mod DJs	Yes	Yes

Notes

- **A** Big Top Luna Park 14 December.
- **B** Palace Theater and Ding Dong Lounge 15 December.

The full lineup was announced on 9 October.

=== 2014 ===
The Plot was not held in 2014.

=== 2015 ===
Bold indicates headline act.

	Sydney ^{[A]}
**Art Vs Science**	Yes
SAFIA	Yes
Tkay Maidza	Yes
Urthboy	Yes
The Griswolds	Yes
Friend Within (UK)	Yes
Tuka	Yes
Matoma (Nor)	Yes
Spit Syndicate	Yes
Basenji	Yes
Asta	Yes
Ngaiire	Yes
Crooked Colours	Yes
Young Franco	Yes
Paces	Yes
Uv Boi	Yes
E^st	Yes
Boo Seeka	Yes
The Meeting Tree	Yes
Luke Million	Yes
L-Fresh The Lion	Yes
B Wise	Yes
Shantan Wantan Ichiban	Yes
Future Love Hungover	Yes
Luen	Yes
Jawz	Yes
Andy Garvey	Yes
Stoney Roads DJs	Yes
Sampa The Great	Yes

Notes

- **A** Parramatta Park 5 December.

The full lineup was announced on 30 September.

=== 2016 ===
- **A** Parramatta Park 19 December.

The full lineup was announced on 24 August.

A.B. Original, Alex Lahey, Allday, Amy Shark, Confidence Man, GL, Hellions, Soul Benefits, Kinder, Ebony Boadu, Sarah Connor, Amber Dubs, The Belligerents, The Bennies, Bootleg Rascal, Buoy, Cult Shotta, Dorsal Fins, Dylan Joel, E^ST, Elizabeth Rose, FROYO, Gold Fields, Hyjak, Indian Summer, Ivan Ooze (rapper), Jannath Beth + DJ Lili Joy, Japanese Wallpaper, Kazi A, Lanks, Luca Brasi, Mallrat, MMAD, Montaigne, Mumbles, Nardine, Nicole Millar, Ocean Alley, Onion Man, Paces, Pierce Brothers, Richard Bell, Running Touch, Tash Sultana, Thelma Plum, Tired Lion, Vera Blue, WSU Poets, Zeadala + Judenn, Ziggy Alberts.

=== 2017 ===
- **A** Parramatta Park 18 December.

The full lineup was announced on 23 August.

Airling, Alex The Astronaut, Alice Ivy, Bec Sandridge, Cable Ties, Clowns, Confidence Man, Dean Lewis, Dear Seattle, Dobby, Haiku Hands, Hatchie, Hollow Coves, Jess Locke, Kuren, Kyle Lionhart, Lastlings, Maddy Jane, Mallrat, Manu Crook$, Miss Blanks, Ninajirachi, Northeast Party House, Nyxen, Odette, Oh Boy, Okenyo, Ruby Fields, Saatsuma, Skegss, Sleepmakeswaves, Stella Donnelly, The Teskey Brothers, Tigertown, Waax, YoungstaCPT (RSA).

== Awards and nominations ==
=== ARIA Music Awards ===
The ARIA Music Awards is an annual awards ceremony that recognises excellence, innovation, and achievement across all genres of Australian music.

Year	Nominee / work	Award	Result	Ref.
2026	Groovin' the Moo	Best Music Festival	Nominated	

=== National Live Music Awards ===
The National Live Music Awards (NLMAs) are a broad recognition of Australia's diverse live industry, celebrating the success of the Australian live scene. The awards commenced in 2016.

Year	Nominee / work	Award	Result
National Live Music Awards of 2016	Groovin the Moo	ACT Live Event of the Year	Won
National Live Music Awards of 2019	Groovin the Moo	Best Live Music Festival or Event	Nominated
National Live Music Awards of 2019	Groovin the Moo	ACT Live Event of the Year	Won
