= Beyond the Valley =

Australian annual music festival

Beyond The Valley
- Genre: Electronic, Dance, Indie, Hip Hop.
- Locations: Barunah Plains Homestead, Victoria, Australia
- Years active: 2014–2019, 2021–
- Organiser: Untitled Group
- Website: beyondthevalley.com.au

Beyond the Valley (commonly known as BTV) is an Australian multi-day music festival that has been held annually since 2014. Currently it is held at Barunah Plains Homestead in Hesse, Victoria, Australia over the New Year's Eve period. It has previously taken place at Phillip Island Circuit, Phillip Island, Lardner Park, Warragul, and in Melbourne city.

== History ==
The festival was first held in 2014 on Phillip Island, just south of Melbourne. From 2015 through 2019 it was held at Lardner Park, Warragul, east of Melbourne. In 2020 the festival was not held due to the COVID-19 pandemic. In 2021 the festival was held at the Sidney Myer Music Bowl in Melbourne city, then in 2022 moved to Barunah Plains Homestead, about 1.5 hours drive west of Melbourne, where it has been held annually since. The Barunah Plains site encompasses a 100,000 square metre natural amphitheatre, from which the festival can be staged.

== Attire ==
Many people who attend BTV are referred to as the 'Naarmy Army', with attendees dressing in 'Naarmcore' style clothes. Naarmcore is a fashion trend that combines the Aboriginal name for Melbourne, Naarm, with the "normcore" style. It became popular on TikTok and is characterized by clothing like puffer jackets, cargo pants, hiking boots, and beanies.

Popular clothing items worn at BTV include scarves, bleached hats, jorts, baggy shirts, and carabiners around one's pants.

== Controversies ==
Festivalgoers in the 2022-23 edition of BTV were forced to wait upwards of eight hours in their cars in 37-degree heat, as the festival's traffic management plan came under scrutiny.

== Artists ==
=== 2014 ===
- Action Bronson (USA)
- AlunaGeorge (UK)
- Bag Raiders (DJ Set)
- Bakermat (NL)
- Ball Park Music
- Banoffee
- Basenji
- Claptone (GER)
- Collarbones
- Cosmo's Midnight
- Dillon Francis (USA)
- Fractures
- Friend Within (UK)
- Ganz (NL)
- Golden Features
- Goldlink (USA)
- Husky
- HWLS
- Kant (DNK)
- Kaytranada (CAN)
- Klo
- Lurch & Chief
- Midnight Juggernauts
- MØ (DNK)
- Motez
- Nina Las Vegas
- Peking Duk
- Pleasurekraft (USA)
- Pond
- Rüfüs
- Sinjin Hawke (CAN/USA)
- Sylvan Esso (USA)
- The Preatures
- Thomas Jack
- Vancouver Sleep Clinic
- Willow Beats
- Yumi Zouma (NZ)
- Allday
- Danny Brown (USA)
- Hermitude
- Tourist (UK)
- Slow Magic
- Tâches (UK)
- Holy Holy
- Indian Summer
- D.D Dumbo
- Ivan Ooze (rapper)
- Mansionair

=== 2015 ===
- Boys Noize (GER)
- Crooked Colours
- Dom Dolla
- Doorly (USA/UK)
- Finnebassen (NOR)
- Flight Facilities
- George Maple
- Ivan Ooze
- Jakubi
- Jamie xx (UK)
- Joy.
- The Jungle Giants
- The Kite String Tangle
- Last Dinosaurs
- Lovebirds (GER)
- Miami Horror
- Northeast Party House
- Odd Mob
- Oscar Key Sung
- Pusha T (USA)
- Remi
- RL Grime (USA)
- The Rubens
- San Cisco
- Set Mo
- Seth Troxler (USA)
- Snakehips (UK)
- Spacey Space
- Ta-ku
- Tkay Maidza
- Totally Enormous Extinct Dinosaurs (DJ Set) (UK)
- Touch_Sensitive
- UV Boi فوق بنفسجي
- Yung Lean (SWE)
- Client Liaison
- Skepta (UK)
- Kingswood
- Hayden James
- E^ST
- Sam Feldt (NL)
- Anna Lunoe
- Oliver Dollar (GER)
- Benson
- Porsches
- Broadway Sounds
- Nico Ghost
- Running Touch
- Feki
- Dividem

=== 2016 ===
- Alex Lahey
- Bag Raiders
- Bakermat (NL)
- Chance The Rapper (USA)
- Dena Amy
- Dune Rats
- DZ Deathrays
- Eats Everything (UK)
- Emma Louise
- Giraffage (USA)
- GoldLink (USA)
- Harts
- Hermitude
- highasakite (NOR)
- Hot Chip (DJ set) (UK)
- Hudson Mohawke (UK/USA)
- Japanese Wallpaper
- Jarryd James
- JME (UK)
- Kllo
- Kölsch (DJ Set) (DNK)
- Ladyhawke (NZ)
- Lastlings
- Lunice (CAN)
- Montaigne
- Motez
- MSTRKRFT (CAN)
- Oliver Huntemann (GER)
- Paces
- Pachanga Boys (MEX/GER)
- Phantogram (USA)
- Running Touch
- Ryan Hemsworth (CAN)
- SAFIA
- Skream (UK)
- Slumberjack
- Sonny Fodera
- Sticky Fingers
- Thundamentals
- Tokimonsta (USA)
- Total Giovanni
- Vera Blue
- Wafia
- What So Not
- ZHU (USA)
- Carl Craig (USA)

=== 2017 ===
- ScHoolboy Q (USA)
- The Presets
- Matt Corby
- Stormzy (UK)
- Mura Masa (UK)
- Stephan Bodzin (GER)
- 2MANYDJs (BEL)
- Adana Twins (GER)
- Âme (GER)
- Amy Shark
- Andhim (GER)
- The Belligerents
- B.Traits (CAN)
- Crooked Colours
- Cub Sport
- Cut Copy
- Dean Lewis
- DMAs
- Dom Dolla
- FKJ (FRA)
- GL
- George Maple
- Harvey Sutherland & Bermuda
- Hayden James
- Hot Dub Time Machine
- Ivan Ooze
- Jack River
- Lastlings
- Late Nite Tuff Guy
- Little Dragon (SWE)
- Marek Hemmann
- Meg Mac
- NAO (UK)
- Patrick Topping (UK)
- Pleasurekraft (USA)
- The Preatures
- Princess Nokia (USA)
- Ruby Fields
- Sampa The Great
- San Cisco
- Skegss
- PNAU
- Dena Amy
- London Topaz
- Mallrat
- Moonbase
- Set Mo

=== 2018 ===
- The Kooks (UK)
- Tash Sultana
- Bonobo (DJ Set) (UK)
- Duke Dumont (UK)
- PNAU
- AJ Tracey (UK)
- Alex Lahey
- Alice Ivy
- Anna
- Ball Park Music
- Big Words
- Bontan (UK)
- Boo Seeka
- Boogs
- CC:DISCO!
- City Calm Down
- Client Liaison
- DJ Tennis (ITA)
- Dom Dolla
- DZ Deathrays
- Fleetmac Wood (USA)
- Foals (DJ Set) (UK)
- Juliet Fox (GER)
- KiNK (BUL)
- Kölsch (DNK)
- Kuren
- SUPERDUPERKYLE (USA)
- Late Nite Tuff Guy
- Mall Grab
- Nastia (UKR)
- Nicole Millar
- Peggy Gou (KOR/GER)
- Remi
- Richy Ahmed (UK)
- Running Touch
- Safia
- Sonny Fodera
- The Jungle Giants
- Vera Blue
- Wafia
- Willaris. K
- Winston Surfshirt
- Yotto (FIN)
- Joey Bada$$ (USA)
- Fisher
- Oxia (FRA)
- Made in Paris
- Cassian
- ABSOLUTE. (UK)
- Jordan Brando
- London Topaz
- Interstellar Fugitives (USA)
- Clea
- Arroyo
- Cassettes For Kids
- Market Memories

=== 2019 ===
- RÜFÜS DU SOL
- Tyler, The Creator (USA)
- 16BL (NL)
- Bag Raiders
- CC:DISCO!
- Chris Lake (UK)
- Claptone (GER)
- Confidence Man
- Cub Sport
- Dena Amy
- Denis Sulta (UK)
- DJ Seinfeld (SWE)
- Dom Dolla
- Floating Points (UK)
- Green Velvet (USA)
- Hayden James
- Heidi (GER)
- Hobo Johnson And The Lovemakers (USA)
- Honey Dijon (USA)
- I Know Leopard
- Jordan Brando
- Kettama (IRL)
- Lastlings
- Late Nite Tuff Guy
- Lion Babe (USA)
- London Topaz
- Made in Paris
- Mallrat
- Matt Corby
- Meg Mac
- Methyl Ethel
- Motez
- Noir
- Owl Eyes
- Patrice Bäumel (GER)
- Rebūke (IRL)
- sama’ (PAL)
- Set Mo
- Shoreline Mafia (USA)
- Skepta (UK)
- Snakehips (UK)
- The Veronicas
- Desert Hearts Takeover including Mikey Lion, Lee Reynolds, Marbs, & Porky (USA)

=== 2021 ===
- PNAU
- Spacey Jane
- Hayden James
- Lime Cordiale
- Allday
- Alice Ivy
- Ball Park Music
- Boo Seeka
- Bradley Zero
- C.FRIM
- Choomba
- Cosmo's Midnight
- Crescendoll
- Dameeeela
- Elizabeth Cambage
- Eves Karydas
- Hot Dub Time Machine
- IJALE
- Jaguar Jonze
- JamesJamesJames
- Jenifer Loveless
- JK-47
- Jordan Brando
- King Stingray
- KYE
- Lastlings
- LOODS
- Lovebirds
- Mallrat
- Motez
- Nina Las Vegas
- Pretty Girl
- Running Touch
- Skin on Skin
- SophieGrophy
- Sycco
- Telenova
- Torren Foot
- Willaris. K
- X Club

=== 2022 ===
- BENEE (NZ)
- Bicep (UK)
- Charlotte De Witte (BEL)
- Denzel Curry (USA)
- DIPLO (USA)
- Dom Dolla
- Flight facilities
- Honey Dijon (USA)
- KAYTRANADA (CAN)
- Lime Cordiale
- Nelly Furtado (CAN)
- Patrick Topping (UK)
- Yeat (USA)
- Aitch (UK)
- Aroha
- Benson
- Budjerah
- Caitlin Medcalf
- Cassettes for kids
- Cloonee (UK)
- Confidence Man
- Denim Foura
- DJ Boring
- Folamour (FRA)
- Haai
- Hatchie
- Heidi
- Jay1 (UK)
- Jesswar
- JK-47
- Jnr Choi (UK)
- Job Jobse (NL)
- Jordan Brando
- JOY.
- Juicy Romance
- KEE'AHN
- Laura King
- Memphis LK
- Merci, Mercy
- Mia Rodriguez
- Ninajrachi
- Or:la (IRE/UK)
- Palms Trax (GER)
- PartiBoi69
- Remi Wolf (USA)
- Rest For The Wicked
- Sally C (IRE/GER)
- Sam Alfred
- San Cisco
- SG Lewis (UK)
- Shygirl (UK)
- Sofia Kourtesis (PE/GER)
- Stüm
- Swim
- Teen Jesus and the Jean Teasers
- The Illustrious Blacks (USA)
- TKAY MAIDZA
- Vera Blue
- X Club
- Willo
- Yarra
- Yung Lean (SWE)
