= NYE in the Park =

Australian annual music festival

NYE In The Park
- Genre: Electronic, Australian, alternative rock, hip-hop
- Dates: 31 December
- Location: Victoria Park, Sydney
- Years active: 2017–present
- Founders: Falcona
- Website: nyeinthepark.com

NYE In The Park is an annual music festival that is held in Victoria Park, Sydney, Australia. The first festival was held on 31 December 2017.

== Artist lineups by year ==
=== 2017 ===
- 2ManyDJs (DJ Set)
- Furnace & The Fundamentals
- Haiku Hands
- Hot Dub Time Machine
- Krafty Kuts & Chali 2NA
- Luen Jacobs
- Maribelle
- Mezko
- Nicole Millar
- Northeast Party House
- Paces (musician)
- Parcels (band)
- Purple Sneakers DJs
- Running Touch
- Total Giovanni
- Tiga (musician)
- Vera Blue
- Yahtzel
- Plus hosts: Retrosweat

=== 2018 ===
- The Presets
- The Jungle Giants
- Hayden James
- Hot Dub Time Machine
- Thundamentals
- Confidence Man (band)
- Luke Million
- One Day DJ's
- Thandi Phoenix
- The Meeting Tree
- Fleetmac Wood
- Cxloe
- Kinder
- SOSUEME DJ's
- Sideboob
- Tasker (producer)

=== 2019 ===
- Hermitude
- Girl Talk (musician) (USA) – exclusive
- Crooked Colours
- Safia
- Client Liaison
- Bag Raiders
- Sneaky Sound System
- Touch Sensitive
- Young Franco
- Graace
- Owl Eyes
- Alice Ivy
- Chase Zera
- Jawbreakers
- Happiness Is Health
- All My Friends DJs
- Van She Tech

=== 2021 ===
- PNAU
- Illy
- Spacey Jane
- The Presets
- What So Not
- Chase Zera
- Dena Amy
- George Alice
- Jim the Kween
- Kinder
- Mashd N Kutcher
- Poof Doof Drag Jamboree
- Sumner (band)
- Thandi Phoenix
- Yo! Mafia
