= Festival of the Sun =

Music festival in New South Wales, Australia

Coordinates: 31°25′40″S 152°54′44″E

Festival of the Sun (FOTSUN) is an annual outdoor music festival held in December at the Sundowner Breakwall Tourist Park, Port Macquarie, New South Wales, Australia. It was first held in 2001 and first ticketed in 2005.

== History ==
Originally launched by Simon Luke who had starting running numerous small free festivals in the region with funds pulled together from small local business support with the concept of building a live arts industry in the region. Festival of the Sun had really officially become known by 2003 once it was moved into the local tourist park still as a free festival with self funding. 2005 was the first ticketed year attracting approximately 1200 people. Festival of the Sun will be coming into its 17th official year in 2022. The COVID-19 pandemic caused the 2020 festival to be scrapped.

- 2005 Line Up: included Sarah Blasko, The Herd, The Mess Hall
- 2006 Line Up: included Augie March, The Beautiful Girls, Mia Dyson, Blue King Brown and The Black Market Rhythm Co.
- 2007 Line Up: included Gotye, Cog, Butterfingers, Clare Bowditch & The Feeding Set, Ash Grunwald, The Fumes, Kid Confucius, Subaudible Hum, The Boat People, Aurora Jane & Massive Change, The Sins, Tjupurru, Mr Percival and George Byrne
- 2008 Line Up: included The Panics, Lior, Kate Miller-Heidke, True Live, Operator Please, Wolf & Cub, That 1 Guy, The Vasco Era, Watussi, Mary Trembles, Dallas Frasca, Flamingo Crash, Barrel House, Roger That, The Jezabels
- 2009 Sold Out – Line Up: included Spiderbait, Little Birdy, The Beautiful Girls, Children Collide, Urthboy, Pez, Philadelphia Grand Jury, Bob Log III, The Wilson Pickers, Grant Walmsley & The Agents of Piece, Bonjah
- 2010 Line Up: Xavier Rudd, Regurgitator, Sharon Jones and the Dap Kings, British India, Calling All Cars, That One Guy, Dallas Frasca, Mojo Bluesmen, Lissa, Bob Corbett, The Mcmenamins, Lee Rosser, Ebb N Flo, Mojada, Sierra Fin, Slow Down Honey, Barrel House, The Chemist, The Seabellies, The Gin Club, Minnie Marks, Fans Dj's.
- 2011 Line Up: Art vs Science, Ladyhawke, Dan Sultan, Hungry Kids of Hungary, Floating Me.
- 2012 Line Up: Kimbra, Dead Letter Circus, Hermitude, DZ Deathrays, the Datsuns
- 2013 Line Up: You Am I, Ash Grunwald (featuring Scott and Andy from the Living End), Glass Towers (cancelled), Kingswood, Spit Syndicate, the Rubens, Stonefield, The Basics
- 2014: The Jezabels, Violent Soho, Shihad, Allday, Dune Rats
- 2015 – Sold Out in record time – Line Up: Jebediah, Alpine, Illy, Thundamentals, the Delta Riggs, Sleepmakeswaves, British India, Dune Rats, Tired Lion, Ecca Vandal
- 2016 – Sold Out in new record time – Line Up: Gang of Youths, Tash Sultana, the Smith Street Band, Seth Sentry, Bad Dreems, Montaigne, Urthboy, Dune Rats, Luca Brasi, Boo Seeka, L Fresh the Lion, Sahara Beck
- 2017 – On Sale 31 August – Line Up: Meg Mac, Ball Park Music, Horrorshow, Holy Holy, Kim Churchill, Bad Dreems, the Preatures, Sampa the Great, Ali Barter, Ivan Ooze, the Cactus Channel, Dear Seattle, Press Club, Maddy Jane, Betty and Oswald, Wharves, Son of Jaguar, SCABZ
- 2018: Vera Blue, Pond, Winston Surfshirt, Skegss, Tkay Maidza, Remi, Angie McMahon, West Thebarton, Slowly Slowly, Kramer, Emily Wurramara, Clowns, Boat Show, Pist Idiots, Good Doogs, Clews, Jess Locke, Body Type, Triple One, Halcyon Drive, Grace Turner
- 2020: cancelled
