= List of top 10 albums for 2017 in Australia =

This is a list of albums that charted in the top ten of the ARIA Album Charts, an all-genre albums chart, in 2017.

== Top-ten albums ==
The list is sorted chronologically by issue date with the date representing the first issue in which the album appeared in the top ten in 2017, regardless of whether an album charted in a previous year or not. Dates reached peak position are in 2017 unless otherwise noted.

Key

(#) - 2017 Year-end top 10 album position and rank

Issue date	Album		Peak	
Issue date	Title	Artist(s)	Position	Date
2 January	Christmas (#8)	Michael Bublé	1	5 December 2011
2 January	Friends for Christmas	John Farnham and Olivia Newton-John	1	19 December 2016
2 January	25 (#4)	Adele	1	30 November 2015
2 January	Blue & Lonesome	The Rolling Stones	1	12 December 2016
2 January	Ripcord	Keith Urban	1	16 May 2016
2 January	Trolls (#6)	Various artists	1	9 January
2 January	24K Magic	Bruno Mars	3	28 November 2016
2 January	The Secret Daughter	Jessica Mauboy	1	24 October 2016
2 January	Hardwired... to Self-Destruct	Metallica	1	28 November 2016
2 January	Suicide Squad	Various artists	1	15 August 2016
9 January	Sing	Various artists	2	16 January
9 January	Moana (#5)	Various artists	2	10 April
9 January	Ladies & Gentlemen	George Michael	2	16 November 1998
9 January	Starboy	The Weeknd	1	5 December 2016
16 January	X (#7)	Ed Sheeran	1	30 June 2014
23 January	I See You	The xx	1	23 January
23 January	Endless	The McClymonts	3	23 January
23 January	La La Land	Various artists	7	23 January
30 January	Dragonfly	Kasey Chambers	1	30 January
6 February	A Girl, a Bottle, a Boat	Train	5	6 February
6 February	After All These Years	Brian & Jenn Johnson	7	6 February
6 February	Notion	Tash Sultana	8	6 February
13 February	The Kids Will Know It's Bullshit	Dune Rats	1	13 February
13 February	Gimme Some Lovin': Jukebox Vol II	Human Nature	1	1 August 2016
13 February	The Rhapsody Tapes	Ocean Grove	5	13 February
13 February	Greatest Hits	Guns N' Roses	5	20 February
20 February	Fifty Shades Darker ^{[S]}	Various artists	1	20 February
20 February	Everyone We Know	Thundamentals	2	20 February
20 February	Human	Rag'n'Bone Man	3	20 February
20 February	Get On Your Feet	Adam Brand	7	20 February
27 February	Postcards from the Shell House	Busby Marou	1	27 February
27 February	Prisoner	Ryan Adams	3	27 February
6 March	Ironbark	The Waifs	1	6 March
6 March	Flying Microtonal Banana	King Gizzard & the Lizard Wizard	2	6 March
6 March	Bardo State	Horrorshow	4	6 March
6 March	Paint	Holy Holy	7	6 March
6 March	21	Adele	1	2 May 2011
13 March	÷ (#1)	Ed Sheeran	1	13 March
13 March	+	Ed Sheeran	1	14 August 2012
13 March	When We Fall	All Our Exes Live in Texas	8	13 March
13 March	After Hours, Close to Dawn	Kingswood	10	13 March
20 March	Beauty and the Beast	Various artists	4	3 April
20 March	19	Adele	3	18 July 2011
20 March	Purpose	Justin Bieber	1	23 November 2015
27 March	More Life	Drake	2	27 March
27 March	So Good	Zara Larsson	7	27 March
27 March	Blossom	Milky Chance	8	27 March
3 April	The 25th Anniversary Album	Lee Kernaghan	2	3 April
3 April	Mesmer	Northlane	3	3 April
3 April	The Afterlove	James Blunt	7	3 April
3 April	Lower the Bar	Steel Panther	10	3 April
10 April	Emperor of Sand	Mastodon	3	10 April
10 April	Automaton	Jamiroquai	7	10 April
17 April	Greatest Hits & Interpretations	Tina Arena	2	17 April
17 April	More Scared of You than You Are of Me	The Smith Street Band	3	17 April
17 April	Memories...Do Not Open	The Chainsmokers	4	17 April
17 April	PTX, Vol. IV - Classics	Pentatonix	10	17 April
24 April	Damn (#10)	Kendrick Lamar	2	24 April
24 April	A Tribute to Mario Lanza	Mark Vincent	3	24 April
24 April	The Search for Everything	John Mayer	5	24 April
1 May	Night Thinker	Amy Shark	2	1 May
1 May	Guardians of the Galaxy Vol. 2 (#9)	Various artists	2	15 May
1 May	Speeding	Allday	6	1 May
8 May	Off the Grid	Bliss n Eso	1	8 May
8 May	Humanz	Gorillaz	4	8 May
8 May	The Great Country Songbook Volume 2	Adam Harvey and Beccy Cole	6	8 May
8 May	Guardians of the Galaxy	Various artists	2	25 August 2012
15 May	Lovely Creatures: The Best of Nick Cave and the Bad Seeds ^{[G]}	Nick Cave and the Bad Seeds	8	15 May
22 May	Harry Styles	Harry Styles	1	22 May
22 May	After Laughter	Paramore	3	22 May
22 May	Welcome Home	Zac Brown Band	8	22 May
29 May	One More Light	Linkin Park	3	29 May
29 May	Superunknown	Soundgarden	1	28 February 1994
29 May	Audioslave	Audioslave	8	25 November 2002
29 May	The Records Were Ours	Pierce Brothers	9	29 May
29 May	California	Blink-182	2	11 July 2016
5 June	Brutal Dawn	Bernard Fanning	2	5 June
5 June	Ark	In Hearts Wake	3	5 June
5 June	Sgt. Pepper's Lonely Hearts Club Band	The Beatles	5 (Note: 2017 reissue)	5 June
5 June	Hi-Vis High Tea	Frenzal Rhomb	9	5 June
12 June	Hopeless Fountain Kingdom	Halsey	2	12 June
12 June	Camacho	Pete Murray	3	12 June
12 June	Relaxer	Alt-J	4	12 June
12 June	Last Young Renegade	All Time Low	5	12 June
12 June	Is This the Life We Really Want?	Roger Waters	7	12 June
19 June	Witness	Katy Perry	2	19 June
19 June	Truth Is a Beautiful Thing	London Grammar	3	19 June
19 June	Wonder	Hillsong United	4	19 June
19 June	Wolves	Rise Against	5	19 June
19 June	Heart Break	Lady Antebellum	6	19 June
26 June	Melodrama	Lorde	1	26 June
26 June	Feed the Machine	Nickelback	3	26 June
26 June	How Did We Get So Dark	Royal Blood	4	26 June
26 June	Crack-Up	Fleet Foxes	10	26 June
3 July	Murder of the Universe	King Gizzard & the Lizard Wizard	3	3 July
3 July	Evolve	Imagine Dragons	4	3 July
3 July	OK Computer OKnotOK 1997 2017	Radiohead	6	3 July
3 July	Grateful	DJ Khaled	7	3 July
3 July	Guide to Better Living	Grinspoon	8	3 July
10 July	Hydrograd	Stone Sour	2	10 July
10 July	Funk Wav Bounces Vol. 1	Calvin Harris	5	10 July
17 July	4:44	Jay-Z	3	17 July
17 July	Something to Tell You	Haim	4	17 July
24 July	Low Blows	Meg Mac	2	24 July
24 July	Baby Driver	Various artists	5	24 July
24 July	Punk Goes Pop Vol. 7	Various artists	10	24 July
31 July	Lust for Life	Lana Del Rey	1	31 July
31 July	Hybrid Theory	Linkin Park	2	28 January 2002
31 July	Meteora	Linkin Park	2	31 March 2003
31 July	Perennial	Vera Blue	6	31 July
31 July	Minutes to Midnight	Linkin Park	1	28 May 2007
31 July	Flower Boy	Tyler, the Creator	8	31 July
7 August	Everything Now	Arcade Fire	2	7 August
7 August	Count On Me	Judah Kelly	3	7 August
7 August	Paranormal	Alice Cooper	4	7 August
7 August	Killer	Dan Sultan	5	7 August
7 August	The Boy Who Cried Wolf	Passenger	6	7 August
7 August	Beautiful – A Tribute to Carole King	Various artists	8	7 August
14 August	Never Too Soon	Boo Seeka	8	14 August
21 August	Life Is Fine	Paul Kelly	1	21 August
21 August	Rainbow	Kesha	3	21 August
21 August	Jen Cloher	Jen Cloher	5	21 August
28 August	Go Farther in Lightness	Gang of Youths	1	28 August
28 August	Sketches of Brunswick East	King Gizzard & the Lizard Wizard	4	28 August
28 August	Dear Desolation	Thy Art Is Murder	5	28 August
28 August	Science Fiction	Brand New	6	28 August
28 August	The Peace and the Panic	Neck Deep	8	28 August
4 September	Villains	Queens of the Stone Age	1	4 September
4 September	A Deeper Understanding	The War on Drugs	5	4 September
4 September	Weight Falls	Kim Churchill	6	4 September
4 September	Fifth Harmony	Fifth Harmony	9	4 September
11 September	Freedom Child	The Script	5	11 September
11 September	Dream Your Life Away	Vance Joy	1	15 September 2014
11 September	American Dream	LCD Soundsystem	10	11 September
18 September	ARIA Number 1 Hits in Symphony	Anthony Callea	1	18 September
18 September	Sleep Well Beast	The National	2	18 September
18 September	All the Light Above It Too	Jack Johnson	3	18 September
18 September	Slowheart	Kip Moore	6	18 September
25 September	Concrete and Gold	Foo Fighters	1	25 September
25 September	Snow	Angus & Julia Stone	2	25 September
25 September	Love Yourself: Her	BTS	8	25 September
25 September	Out of Silence	Neil Finn	9	25 September
2 October	Wonderful Wonderful	The Killers	1	2 October
2 October	Gemini	Macklemore	3	2 October
2 October	The 50 Greatest Hits	Elvis Presley	7	2 October
9 October	Now	Shania Twain	1	9 October
9 October	Younger Now	Miley Cyrus	2	9 October
9 October	California Dreaming	Rick Price and Jack Jones	7	9 October
9 October	Tell Me You Love Me	Demi Lovato	8	9 October
9 October	Greatest Hits	Tom Petty and the Heartbreakers	9	9 October
9 October	Direct Hits	The Killers	10	9 October
16 October	Triple J Like a Version 13	Various artists	1	16 October
16 October	The Secret Daughter Season Two	Jessica Mauboy	2	16 October
16 October	Heaven Upside Down	Marilyn Manson	4	16 October
16 October	As You Were	Liam Gallagher	9	16 October
16 October	Stoney	Post Malone	9	30 October
23 October	Beautiful Trauma (#2)	Pink	1	23 October
23 October	Lotta Sea Lice	Courtney Barnett and Kurt Vile	5	23 October
23 October	Greatest Hits... So Far!!!	Pink	1	22 November 2010
30 October	Flicker	Niall Horan	2	30 October
30 October	The Sin and the Sentence	Trivium	4	30 October
30 October	Listen Without Prejudice Vol. 1	George Michael	2	17 September 1990
30 October	Essential Oils	Midnight Oil	7	12 November 2012
6 November	Vintage Modern	360	3	6 November
6 November	Heartbreak on a Full Moon	Chris Brown	5	6 November
6 November	Meaning of Life	Kelly Clarkson	6	6 November
6 November	Finally It's Christmas	Hanson	7	6 November
13 November	The Thrill of It All	Sam Smith	2	13 November
13 November	Conscious	Guy Sebastian	4	13 November
13 November	The Mortal Coil	Polaris	6	13 November
13 November	Red Pill Blues	Maroon 5	7	13 November
13 November	A Love So Beautiful	Roy Orbison with the Royal Philharmonic Orchestra	9	13 November
20 November	Reputation (#3)	Taylor Swift	1	20 November
20 November	Engraved in the Game	Kerser	5	20 November
20 November	Synthesis	Evanescence	6	20 November
20 November	The Live Tapes Vol. 4	Cold Chisel	9	20 November
27 November	Everyday Is Christmas	Sia	7	27 November
27 November	The Rest of Our Life	Tim McGraw and Faith Hill	9	27 November
4 December	Days Go By	Daryl Braithwaite	5	4 December
4 December	Christmas with Elvis and the Royal Philharmonic Orchestra	Elvis Presley with the Royal Philharmonic Orchestra	7	25 December
11 December	Songs of Experience	U2	5	11 December
18 December	What Makes You Country	Luke Bryan	6	18 December
25 December	Revival	Eminem	1	25 December
