= Felix Bloxsom =

Australian musician and songwriter

- Also known as: Plastic Plates
- Born: Sydney, New South Wales, Australia
- Genres: Jazz; rock
- Occupations: Record producer; drummer; composer; DJ
- Instruments: Drums; vocals
- Years active: 2000–present
- Labels: Kitsuné; Ultra Records; Sony Music Australia; Sweat It Out

Felix Bloxsom is an Australian musician and songwriter, known professionally as Plastic Plates. Bloxsom is best known for his drumming and for playing percussion, additionally working as a DJ and record producer.

Since completing Jazz studies at the Sydney Conservatorium of Music, Bloxsom has performed live and in the recording studio with a diverse group of artists across many styles and genres. These artists include MIKA, Sia, Daniel Merriweather, Empire of the Sun, Christina Aguilera, Kelly Clarkson, Jennifer Lopez, Edward Sharpe and the Magnetic Zeros, Paloma Faith, The Sleepy Jackson, Jamie Lidell, Kristina Train, The Presets, Leona Naess, Elliott Yamin, Sneaky Sound System, Will Young, Missy Higgins. Felix lives in New York City.

Felix was awarded 'Young Australian Jazz Artist of the Year' on 25 August at the 2004 Australian Jazz Bell Awards and 1st place in the National Jazz Awards at the 2004 Wangaratta Festival of Jazz.

== Connection to Sam Sparro ==
Bloxsom went to the same primary school in Sydney as Sam Sparro. Sparro has stated that the two were close friends. While the two were growing up, Felix's father and Sam's grandfather played in local jazz bands together. Bloxsom is credited as having played drums for every song that features the instrument on Sparro's second album Return to Paradise, as well as remixing the song "Shades of Grey" for the album's re-release. On February 14, 2014 the two collaborated again on Plastic Plates' single "Stay in Love".

== Discography ==
=== Singles ===
- Things I Didn't Know I Loved (ft. Simon Lord)
- More Than Love
- Toys
- Come On Strong
- Stay In Love (ft. Sam Sparro)

=== Remixes ===
- Midnight Juggernauts - Lara Vs The Savage Pack
- Empire of The Sun - Girl
- Sia - Cloud
- I Blame Coco - Turn Your Back On Love
- Body Language - Social Studies
- Gypsy and the Cat - Jona Vark
- Adele - Set Fire To The Rain
- Indian Summer - Loveweights ft Shaqdi
- The Human League - Sky
- Mark Ronson - Record Collection 2012
- Para One - Every Little Thing (ft. Irfane & Teki Latex)
- Strange Talk - Cast Away
- Katy Perry - The One That Got Away
- The Magician - I Don't Know What To Do (ft. Jeppe)
- Sam Sparro - Shades of Grey
- Van She - Jamaica
- All The Nights - Chasing Colours
- Sneaky Sound System - Friends
- The Presets - Promises
- The Wombats - Our Perfect Disease
- The Aston Shuffle - Can't Stop Now
- Nile Delta - Aztec
- Miami Horror - Real Slow
- Munk - Intimate Stranger
- Yolanda Be Cool - All That She Wants (ft. Fritz Helder & SYF)
- Sia - Chandelier
- Sia - Alive
