= Ivan Ooze =

Ivan Ooze may refer to:

- Ivan Ooze (Power Rangers), a character in Mighty Morphin Power Rangers
- Ivan Ooze (rapper) (born 1992), Australian rapper, singer, and songwriter
