= Sender (disambiguation) =

A sender is an entity engaged in sending something. Sender may also refer to:

- Sender (telephony), a circuit in an electromechanical telephone exchange sending telephone numbers and other information to another exchange
- the return address of a postal item
- the producer of a message in models of communication
- The Sender, a 1982 horror film
- Sender (film), a 2026 psychological thriller film
- a broadcast radio Transmitter
- Sender (name), a given name and surname
- Sender (band), a rock band from Bendigo
