= Treasure Fingers =

- Born: Ashley Jones
- Genres: Electronic; nu-disco; house
- Occupations: Record producer, DJ
- Instrument: Digital audio workstation
- Website: treasurefingers.com

Treasure Fingers is a DJ and producer based in Atlanta, Georgia, and is signed to Fool's Gold Records.

== Biography ==
Born in a small town in Oklahoma as Ashley Jones, he started originally in the drum and bass band Evol Intent.

He released the worldwide club smash Cross the Dancefloor which was remixed by of Chromeo, Lifelike and Laidback Luke. He has remixed for Chromeo, Miami Horror, Miike Snow among others. He also contributed production to Young Thug's Slime Season 2 .

== Singles ==
Year	Title	Label
2008	Cross The Dancefloor	Fool's Gold Records
2010	It's Love	Defected
2010	Keep Up ft. Haley Small	Fool's Gold Records
2012	Rooftop Revival	Scion A/V
2013	DYWT (with The Knocks)	Fool's Gold Records
2013	My Body (with The Knocks)	Fool's Gold Records
2014	'Names' (with BOSCO)	Fool's Gold Records
2014	Bad MF (with Anna Lunoe)	Nest HQ

== Remixes ==
Year	Title
2008	Chromeo '100%' (Treasure Fingers Remix)
2009	Miami Horror 'Don't Be On with Her' (Treasure Fingers Remix)
2009	Miike Snow 'Animal' (Treasure Fingers Remix)
2009	Empire of the Sun 'Walking on a Dream' (Treasure Fingers Remix)
2010	Classixx 'I'll Get You' ft. Jeppe (Treasure Fingers Remix)
2012	Foster The People 'Call It What You Want' (Treasure Fingers Remix)
2012	Childish Gambino 'Heartbeat' (Treasure Fingers Remix)
2012	Ladyhawke 'Black, White & Blue' (Treasure Fingers Remix)
2013	Totally Enormous Extinct Dinosaurs 'Without You' (Treasure Fingers Remix)
2013	Anna Lunoe 'Breathe' (Treasure Fingers Remix)
2013	Katy Perry 'Roar' (Treasure Fingers Remix)
2016	Indian Summer 'Been Here Before' (Treasure Fingers Remix)
2017	Moby 'Go' (Treasure Fingers Remix)
