= Kid Confucius =

Australian musical group

- Origin: Sydney, Australia
- Genres: Rock, Soul
- Years active: early 2000s–2010
- Labels: Brighton Boulevard Records, Inertia Distribution, Mushroom Publishing
- Members: Rob Hezkial; Andrew Guirguis; Benn Chapman; James Manson; Bart Denaro; Nathan Murray; James Blaxland; Michael Lion
- Past members: James Branson; Dan Cilia; Ray Wassef

Kid Confucius were an eight-piece Australian band from Sydney, Australia. They formed in 2001 and have since played well over 400 live shows around the country, including major festivals as well as their own headline shows at venues such as The Annandale Hotel and The Metro Theatre. In 2005 the band released a self-titled album and two singles "Words" and "Skintight." The album, a mish-mash of soul, hip-hop, pop and funk, received great critical acclaim, most notably from Rolling Stone who hailed the album as one of the standout local releases of the year. "Words" also enjoyed some solid months of radio and TV play. The band released its second album Stripes in 2007 with three singles "Closer", "Last Straw" and "Moment". Stripes was the band's attempt at making a Detroit-era Motown soul album and it was quick to earn rave reviews from press around the country as well as a publishing deal with Mushroom. "Moment" has enjoyed good radio play on triple j. Kid Confucius is set to release its third album in October 2008. The first single from this album, "Good Luck", is out now.

Kid C has also gained a stellar live reputation with many sold out appearances at various Sydney venues. The band has been touring nationally since 2004 as well as performing at big festivals such as Splendour in the Grass, Homebake, The Great Escape, Groovin' The Moo, Festival Of The Sun and more.

Taking a break from touring in early 2008, the band set its sights on writing and recording a new album - its third in as many years. The new album marks a dramatic and radical shift in style and sound for the band. With newfound influences such as Kings Of Leon, The Strokes, Phoenix and The Beatles meeting older influences such as Marvin Gaye and Otis Redding, the new Kid Confucius is more of a live garage soul experience.

== Band Split ==
On 29 March 2010, Kid Confucius announced on their website that they would be splitting. They advised it was an amicable split and that they were going to pursue other musical projects.

== Sound and influences ==
Kid Confucius draws a mix of elements like soul, pop, rock, and hip-hop. The band cites soul artists from Curtis Mayfield, Marvin Gaye, Stevie Wonder, Sly & The Family Stone and Otis Redding, pop from The Beatles and The Beach Boys to the Neptunes, and rock from groups such as Kings Of Leon, The Strokes, Phoenix and The Rolling Stones. The band's older sound also features hip-hop and neo-soul such as The Roots, Common and D'Angelo.

== Line up ==
The band's line up is as follows:

Lead Vocals

- Rob Hezkial

Backup Vocals, Rhythm Guitar

- Andrew Guirguis

Lead Guitar

- James Manson

drums

- Bart Denaro

Bass

- Nathan Murray

Trombone

- Benn Chapman

Tenor Saxophone

- James Blaxland

Alto Saxophone, Flute

- Michael Lion

== Discography ==
Albums

- Kid Confucius, 2005
- Stripes, 2007
- The Let Go, 2008

Singles

- Words, 2005
- Skintight, 2005
- Last Straw, 2006
- Closer, 2006
- Moment, 2007
- Good Luck, 2008

== Charts and awards ==
- Words, Triple J Net 50
- Words filmclip was on most requested clips list on Channel V for over two months.
- the album was featured as album of the week on FBi Radio and SBS Alchemy.
- Skintight film clip won a high commendation in cinematography from the Australian Cinematographers Society in 2005.
- Words nominated for a 2006 Urban Music Award.
- Won title Best Urban Act at Australian Dance Music Awards in November 2006
- Won title Best R&B Band at Australian Urban Music Awards in August 2007

== See also ==
- Australian hip hop
- Soul music
- Music of Australia
