= DJ Ajax =

Australian DJ

Ajax
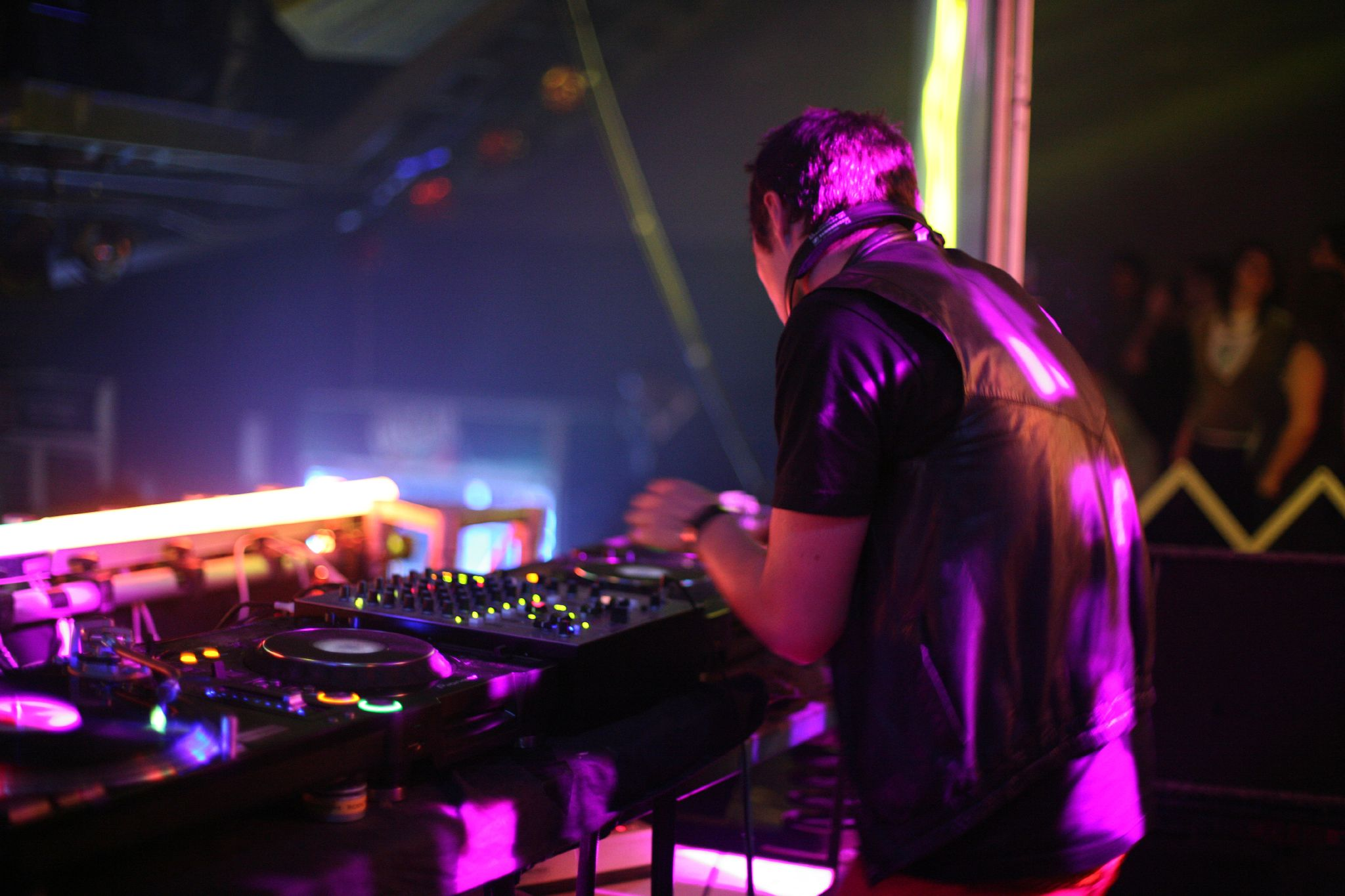
- Ajax DJing in Melbourne in 2005

Background information
- Also known as: Ajax
- Born: Adrian Thomas; 5 August 1971
- Origin: Australia
- Died: 28 February 2013 (aged 41) Parkville, Melbourne, Victoria, Australia
- Genre: Electro mash/ up
- Occupations: Disc jockey Record producer
- Label: Sweat It Out

Adrian Thomas (5 August 1971 – 28 February 2013), better known as DJ Ajax, was an Australian Electronic Dance Music DJ known for playing a wide range of styles, including electro, techno and electroclash.

== Career ==
Thomas was a radio show host for Sunsets (Bang Gang Show) on FBI Radio 94.5 and a founding member of Australian collective Bang Gang.

He toured France, USA and the UK in 2006 for Modular UK and released a remix/mix CD package Spin City through Tinted Records. In turn, he mixed Ministry of Sound Mashed 1 and Ministry of Sound Mashed 2 with Bang Gang DJs in 2002 and 2004 respectively, and a mix CD with Tiga titled INTHEMIX.05 in 2005.

Ajax was voted one of Australia's top 5 DJs in the inthemix 50 poll, taking out the number one spot in both 2006 and 2007. He started his own record label Sweat It Out in 2008 which went on to sign Rufus Du Sol, What So Not, Anna Lunoe, Yolanda Be Cool and Indian Summer among others.

== Death ==
Thomas was crossing a road in Parkville, an inner Melbourne suburb, in the early hours of 28 February 2013 when he was hit by a truck driver and died at the scene.
