= Ivan Ooze (rapper) =

Australian rapper

- Born: Benjamin Townsend
- Origin: Melbourne, Victoria, Australia
- Genres: Hip hop, Rap
- Occupations: Singer; Rapper
- Instrument: Vocals
- Years active: 2015–present
- Label: Cooking Vinyl Australia
- Website: www.ivanooze.com.au

Benjamin Townsend, known professionally as Ivan Ooze is an Australian rapper, singer and songwriter from Melbourne, Victoria. He first became known for viral videos he posted on Facebook in 2015. In 2020, Ivan Ooze started a duo project with Tasker titled 'Rest For The Wicked' and signed to EMI Music Australia.

== Career ==
Ivan Ooze has released two albums and has supported Wu-Tang Clan, Azealia Banks, Ice Cube, Cypress Hill and Bliss n Eso nationally around Australia. He has played at Australian festivals including Beyond The Valley Festival, The Grass is Greener, Festival Of The Sun and Yours and Owls.

== Discography ==
=== Albums ===
- '93 KFC Rotisserie Gold (2016)
- The Social Alien 2: Memoirs from the Milkyway (2017)
- Isolation of Mistaken Infamy (2026)

=== Singles ===
- "Ghosts" (2023)
- "Fire" (2015)
- "Bills" Featuring Ghostface Killah (2016)
- "Bounce That" (2017)
- "Clouds" (2017)
- "Get with It" (2017)
- "Accidental Romance" (2017)
- "Deserve" (2018)
- "Way Past Them" (2018)

==== As featured artist ====
- Noy – Swarm (2016)
- Krafty Kuts, Dynamite MC – Can I Get (2017)
- Crooked Colours – I Hope You Get It (2017), ARIA: Gold
- Bootleg Rascal – To The Moon (2018)
- Kuren (singer) – Flying Cars (2018)
- Dexter Seamus – Slow Down (2020)
- Congrats – Believe The Hype (2021)
- Joel Fletcher – Flutech (2022)
