= Crooked Colours =

Australian alternative dance group

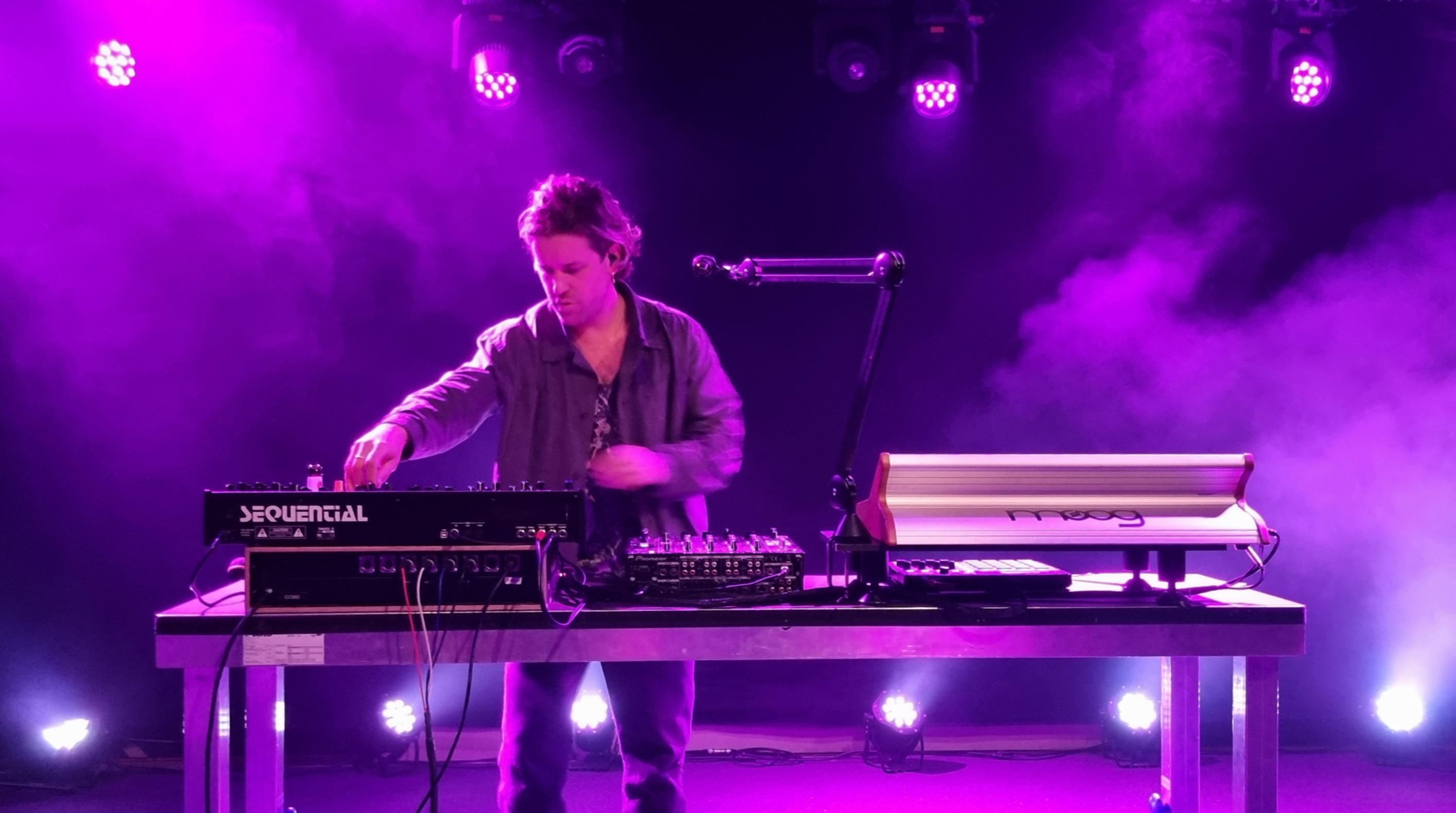

Background information
- Origin: Fremantle, Western Australia, Australia
- Genres: Indie dance; electronic dance; house
- Years active: 2013–present
- Label: Sweat It Out
- Members: Philip Leonard Slabber
- Past members: Leon Debaughn (2013-2023); Liam Merrett-Park (2013-2023)
- Website: www.crookedcoloursmusic.com

Crooked Colours is the alternative dance project of Australian singer, songwriter and music producer Philip Leonard Slabber (born 14 February 1991) . Based in Fremantle, Western Australia, the project is signed to record label Sweat It Out.

Slabber originally conceived the project with fellow producer Leon Debaughn in Perth in 2013. Later joined by drummer Liam Merrett-Park. The project's first album Vera was released in June 2017. Their sophomore album Langata was released in 2019.

In December 2023 Slabber made an announcement saying that both Debaughn and Merrett-Park "are moving on to the next stages of their lives" and that he would continue under the Crooked Colours name.

== Touring ==
Crooked Colours has performed at many festivals and events including: Groovin The Moo, Spilt Milk, Beyond The Valley, Falls Festival, Bonnaroo, and Splendour In The Grass.

== Discography ==
=== Studio albums ===
List of studio albums, with release date, label, and selected chart positions shown
Title	Details	Peak chart positions
Title	Details	AUS
Vera	Released: 23 June 2017; Label: Sweat It Out; Formats: CD, LP, digital download, streaming	68
Langata	Released: 17 May 2019; Label: Sweat It Out; Formats: CD, LP, digital download, streaming	52
Tomorrows	Released: 23 September 2022; Label: Sweat It Out / Atlantic Records; Formats: CD, LP, digital download, streaming	—
Dirt Road Gold	Released: 21 August 2026; Label: Sweat It Out; Formats: CD, LP, digital download, streaming	31

=== Extended plays ===
List of EPs, with release date and label shown
Title	Details
In Your Bones	Released: 9 May 2014; Label: Sweat It Out; Formats: Digital download, streaming
Triple J: Live At The Wireless 2019	Released: 24 April 2020; Label: Australian Broadcasting Corporation; Formats: Digital download, streaming

=== Singles ===
List of singles, with year released and album name shown
Title	Year	Certifications	Album
"Moontan Nocturnal"	2013		Non-album single
"Come Down"	2014		In Your Bones
"In Your Bones"	2014		In Your Bones
"Capricious"	2014		Non-album singles
"Another Way"	2015		Non-album singles
"Step"	2015		Non-album singles
"Flow"	2017	ARIA: Platinum	Vera
"I Hope You Get It" (featuring Ivan Ooze)	2017	ARIA: Gold	Vera
"Perfect Run"	2018		Vera
"I'll Be There"	2018	ARIA: Gold	Langata
"Do It Like You"	2018	ARIA: Platinum	Langata
"Hold On"	2019	ARIA: Gold	Langata
"Never Dance Alone" (featuring Ladyhawke)	2019		Langata
"I C Light" (Hosh Remix)	2019		Langata
"Love Language"	2020	ARIA: Gold	Tomorrows
"Falling"	2020		Tomorrows
"Superpowerful" (with Slenderbodies)	2021		Non-album single
"No Sleep"	2021		Tomorrows
"Rather Be With You" (with Hayden James)	2021		Non-album single
"Light Year" (featuring Masked Wolf and Jesiah)	2021		Tomorrows
"Feel It"	2022		Tomorrows
"Holiday"	2022		Tomorrows
"Tomorrows" (Kyle Watson Remix)	2022		Tomorrows
"Don't Give Up On Me" (KC Lights Remix)	2022		Tomorrows
"I Can't Forget You"	2025		Dirt Road Gold
"Pink Limo"	2026		Dirt Road Gold
"Come Thru"	2026		Dirt Road Gold
"Oxford"	2026		Dirt Road Gold
"All Yours" (featuring Georgi Kay)	2026		Dirt Road Gold
"Freo Dream"	2026		Non-album single

== Awards and nominations ==
=== AIR Awards ===
The Australian Independent Record Awards (known informally as the AIR Awards) are an annual series of awards which recognise, promote and celebrate the success of Australia's independent music sector. In 2018, Crooked Colours were nominated for one award,

Year	Nominee / work	Award	Result
2018	Vera	Best Independent Dance/Electronic Album	Nominated
