= Sweat It Out (record label) =

Australian dance music record label

- Founded: 2008
- Founder: Adrian Thomas
- Status: Active
- Distributor: Warner Music Australia
- Genre: Dance Music
- Country of origin: Australia
- Location: Sydney
- Official website: sweatitoutmusic.com

Sweat It Out is an Australian Dance Music record label founded by Adrian Thomas (a.k.a. Ajax) in 2008.

In February 2021, the label announced the launch of its publishing arm, bringing on a handful of songwriters as its first signees.

== Artists ==
- Ajax
- Anna Lunoe
- Anna Bass
- A-Trak
- Crooked Colours
- Caseno
- Dena Amy
- Dillon Francis
- Diplo
- Dom Dolla
- ELTE
- Enschway
- Free Nations
- Go Freek
- Indian Summer
- Karma Fields
- Luude
- Matilda Pearl
- Mazy
- Moli
- Motez
- Nicky Night Time
- PoloShirt
- Pricie
- Purple Disco Machine
- Rüfüs Du Sol
- Slumberjack
- Torren Foot
- What So Not
- Winston Surfshirt
- Yolanda Be Cool

== See also ==
- List of record labels
