= Hot Dub Time Machine =

Australian DJ

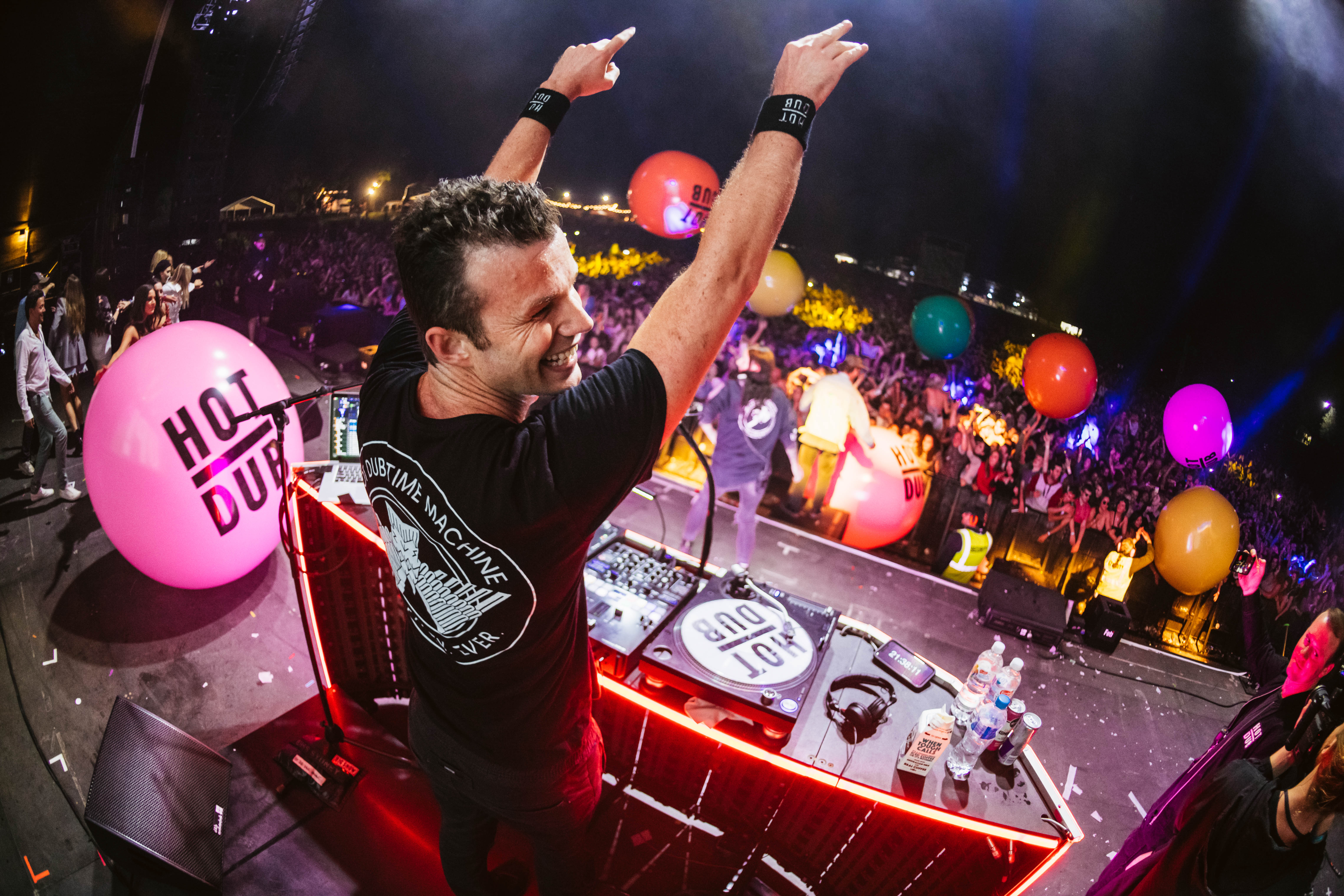

Background information
- Born: Tom Lowndes
- Origin: Sydney, New South Wales, Australia
- Occupation: DJ
- Years active: 2011–present
- Website: www.hotdubtimemachine.com

Tom Lowndes (DJ Tom Loud), known professionally as Hot Dub Time Machine, is an Australian DJ. He has had international success playing at festivals and events including the likes of: Coachella, Tomorrowland, Field Day, Stereosonic, Falls Festival, Groovin the Moo, Reading and Leeds Festival, Latitude Festival, FIB Benicassim and Splendour in the Grass.

He has toured extensively around Australia, the UK, Asia the USA and Europe. He has played at Brixton Academy in London twice and performed the biggest shows in the history of the Edinburgh Fringe at the Royal Highland Centre in with 13,500 people attending two shows in 2017. He has performed at the Edinburgh Fringe every year from 2012 to 2019.

== Background ==
Hot Dub shows usually consists of a two-and-a-half-hour mix of popular music in chronological order, starting from the 1950s or 1970s going through to the present, although he often plays shorter festival sets. It’s an audio-visual show with Lowndes mixing live on vinyl turntables using Serato and Mix Emergency.

== History ==
He developed the show for the 2011 Sydney Fringe Festival, but it first found success at the 2012 Adelaide Fringe, and 2012 Edinburgh Fringe.

=== 2013 ===
He sold over 15,000 tickets at the Edinburgh Fringe and was able to become a full time DJ at the age of 35.

=== 2014 ===
Lowndes transitioned from Fringe to mainstream festivals playing Falls Festival, Splendour in the Grass and played to 80,000 at Edinburgh’s Hogmanay NYE street party.

=== 2015 ===
Lowndes played at Groovin the Moo, Coachella, Stereosonic and Sydney’s ‘City to Surf’ Fun Run to 80,000 people.

=== 2016 ===
He performed at the Australian Open, British GP at Silverstone, Melbourne’s Cox Plate, Canberra’s Spilt Milk Festival, along with his own UK and Australian tours and started Hot Dub Wine Machine (see below).

=== 2017 ===
He performed at Latitude Festival in the UK, the Melbourne Cup and Beyond the Valley Fest.

=== 2018 ===
He performed at the Brisbane Commonwealth Games, Isle of Wight Festival, Rock Oz’Arènes in Switzerland, Reading and Leeds Festival, It’s the Ship Festival in Singapore and before the Australia - India 20/20 Cricket games at the SCG, MCG and Gabba.

=== 2019 ===
He performed in Hakuba Japan, the F1 Australian GP, Ability Fest, Electric Castle in Romania, Territory Day Darwin, FIB Benicassim, Tomorrowland, Marquee Singapore and Your’s and Owls Festival.

=== 2020 ===
While in COVID looked down Lowndes launched his ‘Hot Dub at Home’ livestream on Twitch, which was one of the biggest live streams of 2020 with over 150,000 unique viewers tuning into 13 free shows between April and October. Hot Dub at Home continued in 2021 culminating in a ‘I Feel Good’ fundraiser stream, raising over 60,000 for Lifeline Australia.

=== 2021 ===
Hot Dub played at ‘Beyond the City’ NYE in Melbourne’s Sidney Myer Music Bowl and started 2022 at Sydney’s iconic Field Day Festival.

== Wine Machine ==
Lowndes started the festival 'Hot Dub Wine Machine' with his former management in 2016 in McLaren Vale South Australia. Later re-branded as ‘Wine Machine’ the festival became an annual, national, touring festival from 2017. They also launched New Years Eve in the Park in Sydney in 2017, Stein Machine in Edinburgh and Snow Machine in Hakuba, Japan in 2020.

In 2020, Lowndes split with Wine Machine and is no longer at all involved in owning or running any festivals.As of May 2023 Hot dub still continues to play at wine machine festivals.

He is now managed by TMRW music
