= Pist Idiots =

Australian rock band

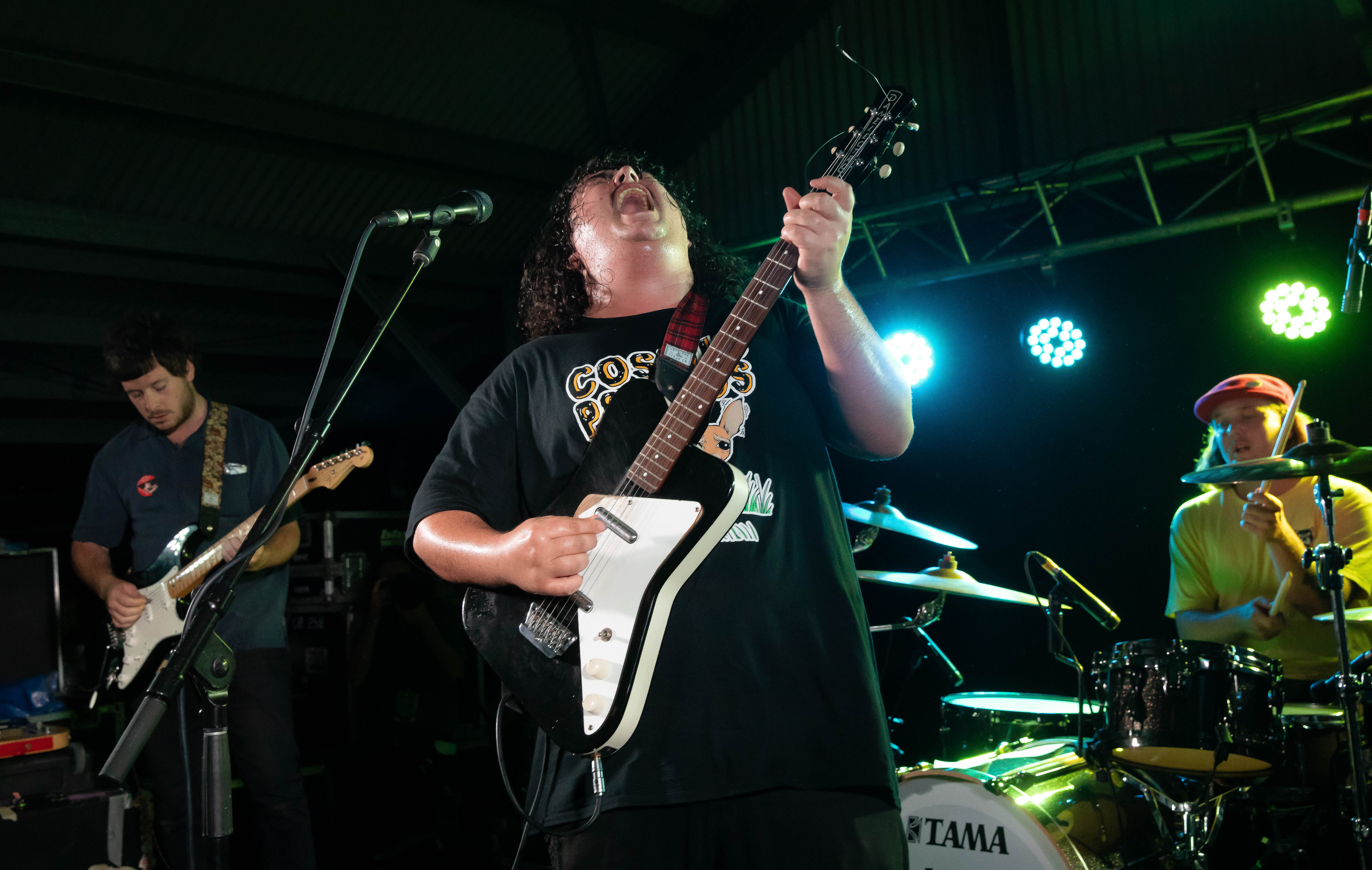
- Pist Idiots performing in 2018

Background information
- Origin: Revesby, New South Wales, Australia
- Genres: Pub rock; punk rock; garage rock
- Years active: 2017–present
- Labels: Flightless
- Members: Jack Griffith; Joseph Quine; Thomas Quine; Jonathon Sullivan
- Website: www.pistidiots.com

Pist Idiots are an Australian pub rock band from Revesby, New South Wales. The band's line-up consists of lead vocalist/rhythm guitarist Jack Griffith, drummer Jonathon Sullivan and brothers Joseph (lead guitar) and Thomas (bass) Quine.

The band's name comes from a suggestion by a friend who said "call yourself Pist Idiots" because they were drunk in the garage at the time. " Pist" serves as a homophone of "pissed", which is Australian slang for being exceptionally intoxicated.

Their debut studio album, Idiocracy, was released in September 2021.

== History ==
=== Pre-2017: Formation ===
In a 2019 interview with Tone Dead the guitarist and frontman Jack Sniff said "We were just mates from school. We just started playing together in a garage, then a trivia night and then to the Battle of the Bands. A year goes by and we were still hanging out, jamming, making songs and not really thinking too much about anything. Then, we supported our mates' band and started playing maybe once a week and then started playing three times a week for a good year and a half or two years, maybe. So, there was a big period where we were nonstop doing hard gigging."

=== 2017–present: Early EPs and Idiocracy ===
In May 2017, Pist Idiots released their debut single, "Fuck Off", the lead single from their debut self-titled EP. Following the EPs release, the band toured with The Gooch Palms and Skegss.

In July 2018 Pist Idiots released their second EP titled Princes. It spawned the singles "Leave It At That" and "Smile".

In September 2018, Pist Idiots released their third EP, Ticker. It was their first to be released on vinyl. The EP was proceeded by the singles "Motor Runnin'", "Roundhouse" and "Ticker".

On 10 September 2021, Pist Idiots released their debut studio album, Idiocracy. The album was produced by Alex Cameron and Chris Collins.

== Band members ==
- Jack Griffith ("Jack Sniff") – lead vocals, rhythm guitar
- Joseph Quine ("Joey Tomato") – lead guitar, backing vocals
- Thomas Quine ("Tommy Tomato") – bass guitar, backing vocals
- Jonathon Sullivan ("Belton Jon") – drums

Baby Cat

== Discography ==
=== Studio albums ===
List of studio albums, with release date, label, and selected chart positions shown
Title	Details	Peak chart positions
Title	Details	AUS
Idiocracy	Released: 10 September 2021; Label: Pist Idiots, Flightless (S44CD0006); Formats: CD, LP, digital download, streaming	12

=== Extended plays ===
List of EPs, with release date and label
Title	Details
Pist Idiots	Released: 31 May 2017; Label: Pist Idiots; Format: CD, Digital download, streaming
Princes	Released: 16 July 2018; Label: Pist Idiots; Format: CD, Digital download, streaming
Ticker	Released: 20 September 2019; Label: Space 44; Format: CD, Digital download, streaming, LP
