= Indian Summer (music producer) =

Australian record producer and DJ

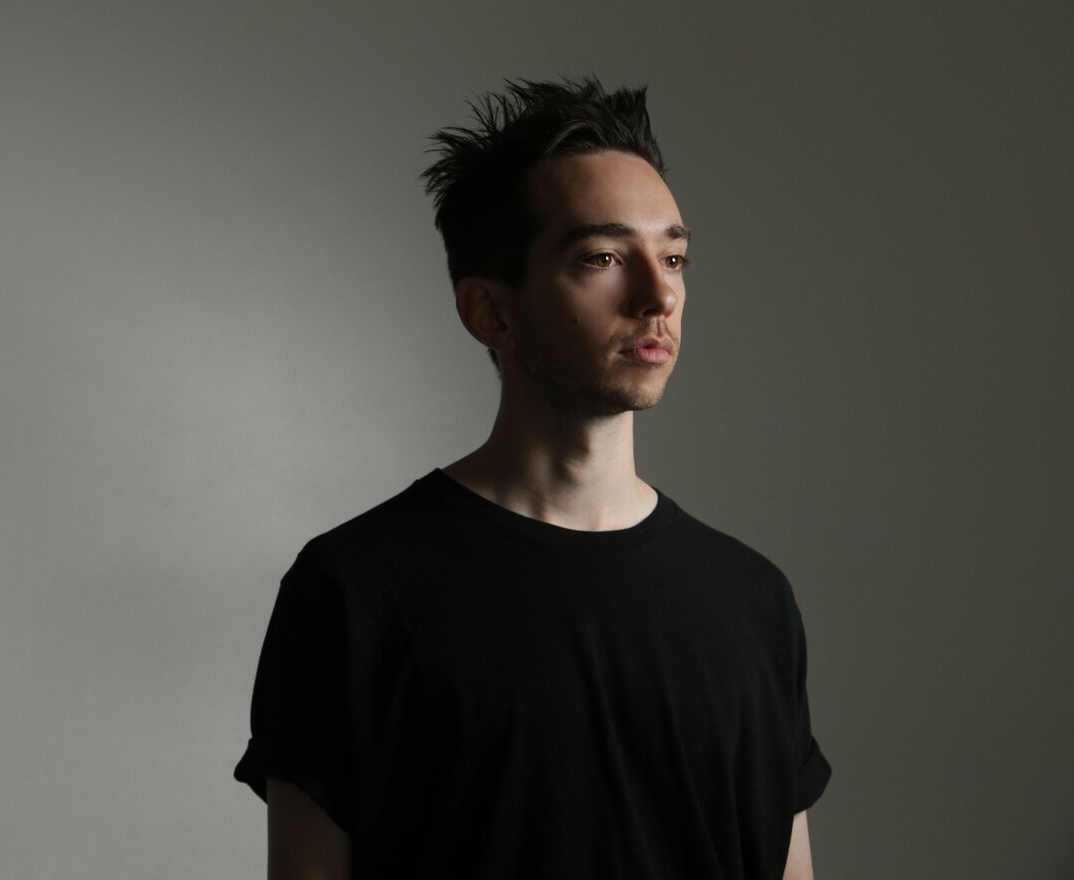
- Gleeson in 2019

Background information
- Born: Gabriel Gleeson; Melbourne, Victoria, Australia
- Genres: Electronic; dance; house; synth-pop
- Occupations: Record producer, DJ
- Instrument: Digital audio workstation
- Years active: 2010–present
- Labels: Sweat It Out! Music, Warner Music Group, Indian Summer Music
- Past members: Chevy Long
- Website: www.indiansummerau.com

Indian Summer is an electronic music project of Australian record producer, DJ, songwriter, and radio personality Gabe Gleeson. He also produces music under the name Gabe Ruth.

== Early life and education ==
Gabe Gleeson is the grandson of Italian/Australian filmmaker Giorgio Mangiamele.

He performed in bands throughout high school and studied design at university before leaving to focus on the project.

== Career ==
Indian Summer was previously a duo with Chevy Long.

In 2012 Indian Summer signed to Australian electronic label Sweat It Out! Music! Music by its late founder DJ Ajax, they embarked on their first Australian tour and were listed among FBi Radio's most played artists the following year. In 2014 they were invited to perform at SXSW, toured the United States (making appearances in support of Robert Delong and Digitalism), were named as one of MTV Australia's top producers of the year and mixed Sweat It Out! Music’s ‘Let’s Sweat’ compilation album released by Universal Music Australia. Indian Summer again toured domestically as part of Nina Las Vegas Presents alongside TKAY Maidza, Cosmo's Midnight, Motez, Touch Sensitive, and L D R U as well as for Sweat It Out! Music's 2015 Tour with Dom Dolla, Cassian and Go Freek.

In 2014, Indian Summer performed at Splendour In The Grass, Field Day, Falls Festival, and Beyond The Valley.

"Shiner", ft. Ginger & The Ghost, reached #1 on the Hype Machine chart in 2015; its recording and film clip were respectively added to rotation on triple j, Foxtel's Channel V and along with 'Loveweights' ft. Shaqdi, The ABC's Rage program. The act has been the subject of multiple features on triple j including two hour long Mix Up segments and its works have attracted unofficial video remixes from fans.

As of 2020, he also releases music under the pseudonym Gabe Ruth through Medium Rare Recordings. His 2022 single 'Make Your Move' was added to rotation on Triple J Unearthed Radio.

== Other activities ==
Gleeson was the editor of influential Australian electronic music website Purple Sneakers between 2012 and 2015, hosted its corresponding two-hour weekly radio program and has spoken on industry panels at EMC and BigSound.

== Discography ==
=== Albums and EPs ===
Title	Details	Tracklist
No Use	Released: 3 May 2013; Label: Sweat It Out! Music; Formats: Digital download	No Use; 1.01 My Heard Drops
Foreign Formula	Released: 14 June 2013; Label: Sweat It Out! Music; Formats: Digital download	Foreign Formula; Grand Rapids
Aged Care	Released: 2 February 2014; Label: Sweat It Out! Music; Formats: Digital download	Aged Care ft Benjamin Joseph; Pin Tweaks
Shiner ft. Ginger & The Ghost	Released: 24 October 2014; Label: Sweat It Out! Music; Formats: Digital download	Shiner ft. Ginger & The Ghost; Palm Kings
Loveweights	Released: 19 December 2014; Label: Sweat It Out! Music; Formats: Digital download	Loveweights ft. Shaqdi; The Quays
Late Night	Released: 16 December 2015; Label: Sweat It Out! Music, Warner Music Group; Formats: Digital download	Elliptical; Feel My Way; Kater Kall; Slideways

=== Singles ===
Title	Released	Label
Been Here Before ft Eloise Cleary	26 August 2016	Sweat It Out! Music; Warner Music Group
Love Like This ft. Lastlings	11 November 2016	Sweat It Out! Music; Warner Music Group
Right At Home ft. Aaron Michael	23 April 2018	Sweat It Out! Music

=== Remix EPs ===
Title	Details	Tracklist
Foreign Formula (Remixed)	Released: 30 August 2013; Label: Sweat It Out! Music; Formats: Digital download	Foreign Formula (Cosmo's Midnight Remix); Foreign Formula (Sinden Remix); Foreign Formula (Jam Xpress Remix); Foreign Formula (Yolanda Be Cool Remix)
Loveweights (Remixed)	Released: 15 December 2014; Label: Sweat It Out! Music; Formats: Digital download	Loveweights ft Shaqdi (VIP Edit); Loveweights ft Shaqdi (Plastic Plates Remix); Loveweights ft Shaqdi (Ape Drums Remix); Loveweights ft Shaqdi (Worthy Remix); The Quays
Shiner (Remixes)	Released: 24 October 2014; Label: Sweat It Out! Music; Formats: Digital download	Shiner ft Ginger & The Ghost (VIP Edit); Shiner ft Ginger & The Ghost (Option4 Remix); Shiner ft Ginger & The Ghost (Akouo Remix); Shiner ft Ginger & The Ghost (Mike Metro Remix)
Been Here Before (The Remixes)	Released: 30 September 2016; Label: Sweat It Out! Music; Formats: Digital download	Been Here Before ft Eloise Cleary (Treasure Fingers Remix); Been Here Before ft Eloise Cleary (Treasure Fingers Dub); Been Here Before ft Eloise Cleary (Røse Remix); Been Here Before ft Eloise Cleary (Kuren Remix); Been Here Before ft Eloise Cleary (Ghost Dogg Remix)
Love Like This (The Remixes)	Released: 9 December 2016; Label: Sweat It Out! Music; Formats: Digital download	Love Like This ft Lastlings (Bart B More Remix); Love Like This ft Lastlings (Bart B More Dub); Love Like This ft Lastlings (Kry Wolf Remix); Love Like This ft Lastlings (Kry Wolf Dub); Love Like This ft Lastlings (Lewis Cancut Remix); Love Like This ft Lastlings (Auro Remix)
Right At Home (Remixes)	Released: 8 May 2018; Label: Sweat It Out! Music; Formats: Digital download	Right At Home ft Aaron Michael (Extended Mix); Right At Home ft Aaron Michael (More Than Friends Remix); Right At Home ft Aaron Michael (Westend Remix); Right At Home ft Aaron Michael (BYOR Remix)

=== Remixes ===
Year	Title	Label
2011	Geoffrey O'Connor 'So Sorry' (Indian Summer Remix)	Self Released
2011	Architecture In Helsinki 'Escapee' (Indian Summer Remix)	Modular Recordings
2012	Polographia 'Righteous Hit' (Indian Summer Remix)	Self Released
2013	Kissy Sell Out 'Who Walks Alone' (Indian Summer Remix)	San City High
2013	Caseno 'Sebastien' (Indian Summer Remix)	Sweat It Out! Music
2013	Tyler Touche 'Technicolor Symphony' (Indian Summer Remix)	Self released
2013	Terace 'Running' ft. Jupiter Project (Indian Summer Remix)	Sweat It Out! Music
2013	Jessie Andrews 'You Won't Forget Tonight' ft. Comets We Fall (Indian Summer Remix)	Metropolis London Music Limited
2013	Sinden & Vato Gonzalez '$100 Infinite Kung Fu Vixens' (Indian Summer Remix)	Sweat It Out! Music
2013	Safia 'Listen To Soul, Listen To Blues' (Indian Summer Remix)	Self released
2014	CVIRO & GXNXVS 'Benjamins' (Indian Summer Remix)	October Records / Universal Music Australia
2014	The Aston Shuffle 'Tear It Down' (Indian Summer Remix)	Universal Music Australia
2014	Beni 'Protect' ft. Antony & Cleopatra (Indian Summer Remix)	Modular Recordings
2014	Elizabeth Rose 'Sensibility' (Indian Summer Remix)	Inertia
2015	Porsches 'Karate' (Indian Summer Remix)	Sweat It Out! Music
2015	Antony & Cleopatra 'Sirens' (Indian Summer Remix)	+1 Records, Vitalic Noise
2015	Yolanda Be Cool 'Sugar Man' (Indian Summer Remix)	Sweat It Out! Music

=== Compilations ===
Year	Label	Title	Details
2013	La.Ga.Sta.	Late Summer compilation Vol 3.	Appears on
2014	TheSoundYouNeed	TheSoundYouNeed Vol. 1	Appears on
2014	Sweat It Out! Music	'Let's Sweat' Vol 1.	Mixed by / appears on
2015	Sweat It Out! Music	Sweat It Out Classics	Appears on
2017	TheSoundYouNeed	TheSoundYouNeed Vol. 3	Appears on
2018	Sweat It Out! Music	Sweat It Out 2008 - 2018 (Mixed)	Appears on

=== Music videos ===
Year	Title	Director
2014	Shiner ft. Ginger & The Ghost	Jack Toohey
2015	Loveweights ft. Shaqdi	Tay Kaka & Liam Ozdemir
2017	Love Like This ft. Lastlings	Liam Ozdemir

== Gabe Ruth ==
=== Singles ===
Year	Title	Label
2020	Asking	Medium Rare Recordings
2020	Tell Em	Medium Rare Recordings
2021	Make My Night	Medium Rare Recordings
2021	Make My Night (4am Remix)	Medium Rare Recordings
2022	Make Your Move ft. Rosie Kate	Medium Rare Recordings
2024	Better Than You Thought (w/Douglas York)	HUGS

=== Remixes ===
Year	Title	Label
2020	Rosie Kate 'Silent & Grey' (Gabe Ruth Remix)	ATN Recordings
2021	TAYA & Jamie Vale 'Am I Wrong' (Gabe Ruth Remix)	Flotilla Records
