= Shaqdi =

Swedish-born songwriter

- Origin: Sweden
- Genres: future-soul; electronic; R&B
- Instruments: Vocals; piano; violin
- Years active: 2014–present
- Labels: Shaqdi, East Of Eden
- Website: Instagram

Shaqdi is a London-based Swedish-born songwriter artist. Shaqdi is using her Palestinian father's name as a pseudonym. Shaqdi learned to play the piano and violin when she was four. She grew up in a small town in Sweden, after high school she moved to Stockholm where she completed a degree in Kulturama.

In 2014 she performed feature vocals on the Indian Summer single Loveweights. In 2016, Shaqdi moved to London where she recorded her first single Lover produced by Zagor. Her debut EP Colorless was released in 2018. In 2020 she had released EP Daydreaming. In June 2023, Shaqdi collaborated with Ian Ewing and Latrell James on their newly released eclectic song, "Dayez".
