= Never Too Soon =

Studio album by Boo Seeka
- Released: 4 August 2017
- Label: Sureshaker; Warner Music Australia
- Producer: Ian Pritchett

Singles from Never Too Soon
- 1. "Oh My" Released: 1 April 2016; 2. "Does This Last" Released: 23 February 2017; 3. "Turn Up Your Light" Released: 30 June 2017

Never Too Soon is the debut studio album by Australian electropop duo Boo Seeka, released on 4 August 2017 through Sureshaker Records and Warner Music Australia.

The album debuted and peaked at number eight on the ARIA Albums Chart.

== Background ==
In an interview discussing on the album, band member Sam Croft said:

"This album best reflects our recent life experiences, encapsulating all we've encountered over the past two and a half years. Our recording process for the album followed no structure; we recorded vocals in carparks, tour buses and our studios in Sydney. One vocal loop was recorded into an iPhone on stage in a theatre in America. Ultimately every idea and piece of music we had come together in my bedroom studio, we then took it to our producer Ian Pritchett's garage studio and that's where the songs came to life."

== Reception ==
Triple J called the album "a beautifully crafted, worldly-sounding body of work that was recorded across three continents; in carparks, tour buses and their Sydney studios."

== Track listing ==
1. "Does This Last" - 3:33
2. "Humans" - 3:17
3. "Argo Misty" - 3:13
4. "Gold Sail" - 3:37
5. "Brooklyn" - 3:41
6. "Turn Up Your Light" - 3:55
7. "Oh My" - 3:16
8. "Calling Out" - 3:35
9. "Interlude (One Day Pt. 1)" - 1:33
10. "You and Me" - 4:01
11. "Calm Symphony" - 4:14

== Personnel ==
=== Musicians ===
Boo Seeka

- Ben Gumbleton – vocals
- Sam Croft – production

=== Technical ===
- Ian Pritchett – production

== Charts ==
Chart (2017)	Peak position
Australian Albums (ARIA)	8
