= Late Nite Tuff Guy =

Late Nite Tuff Guy (aka Carmelo Bianchetti, DJ HMC) is a South Australian DJ and electronic music producer, best known for his disco re-edits, including some official work for the Salsoul label.

== Biography ==
He launched his own label, Tuff Cuts, in 2013. He has officially produced remixes for artists including New Order, Herb Alpert and Timmy Thomas. His work during the 1990s under the pseudonym DJ HMC earned him the title of "Godfather of Australian Techno". He performs in nightclubs and at major music festivals regularly. In 2013, he won a remix competition for Jamiroquai's "Too Young To Die".
