= Haiku Hands =

Music group

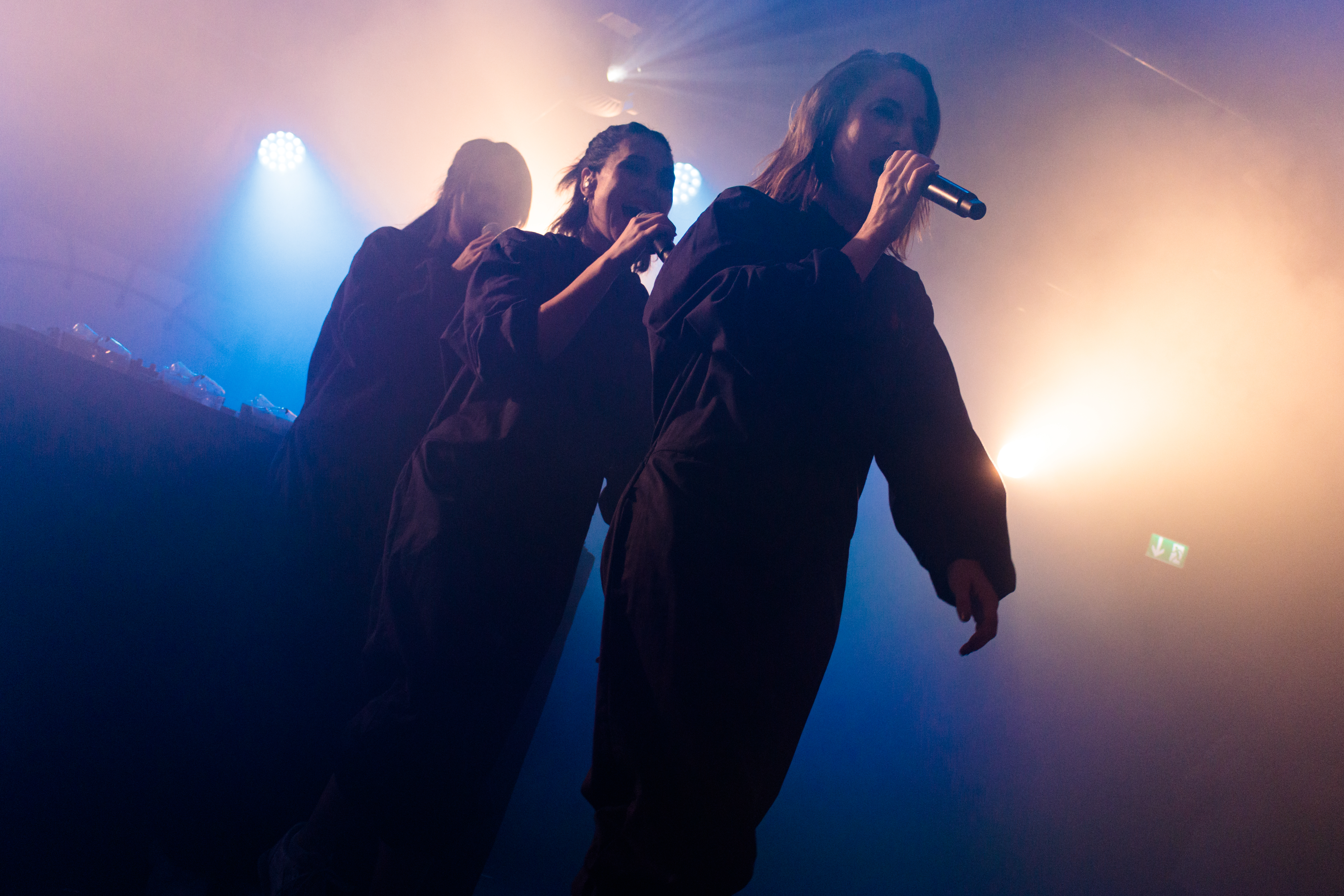
- Haiku Hands at Haldern Pop Festival 2019

Background information
- Origin: Sydney, Melbourne, Australia
- Genres: Dance; electronic; electropop; hip hop; pop
- Years active: 2017–present
- Members: Claire Nakazawa, Beatrice Lewis, Mie Nakazawa, Mataya Young
- Website: haikuhands.com.au

Haiku Hands are an alternative dance electronic music group from Sydney and Melbourne, Australia. The group consists of Claire Nakazawa, Beatrice Lewis, Mie Nakazawa, and performing member Mataya Young. The Nakazawa sisters are from Sydney and Lewis is from Melbourne.

== Touring ==
The group toured nationally with the Groovin' the Moo and Listen Out music festivals. They have also played festivals including Splendour in the Grass, St Jerome's Laneway Festival, Wonderland Scarehouse Tour, WOMADelaide, Pitch Festival and Party In The Paddock. Haiku Hands have supported Flight Facilities and Bloc Party on their Australian tours. In 2019, they toured with Sofi Tukker.

== Members ==
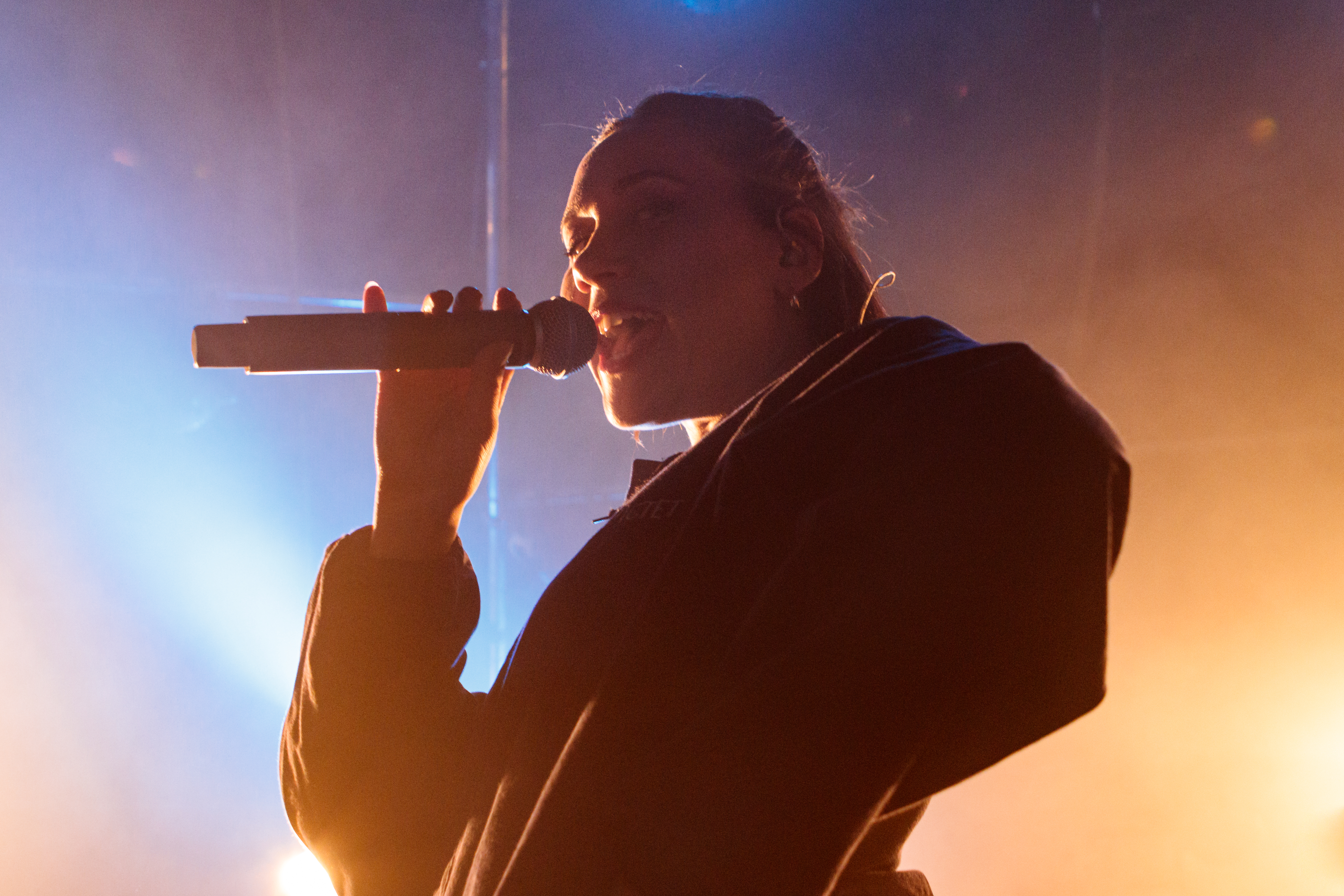
Mie Nakazawa

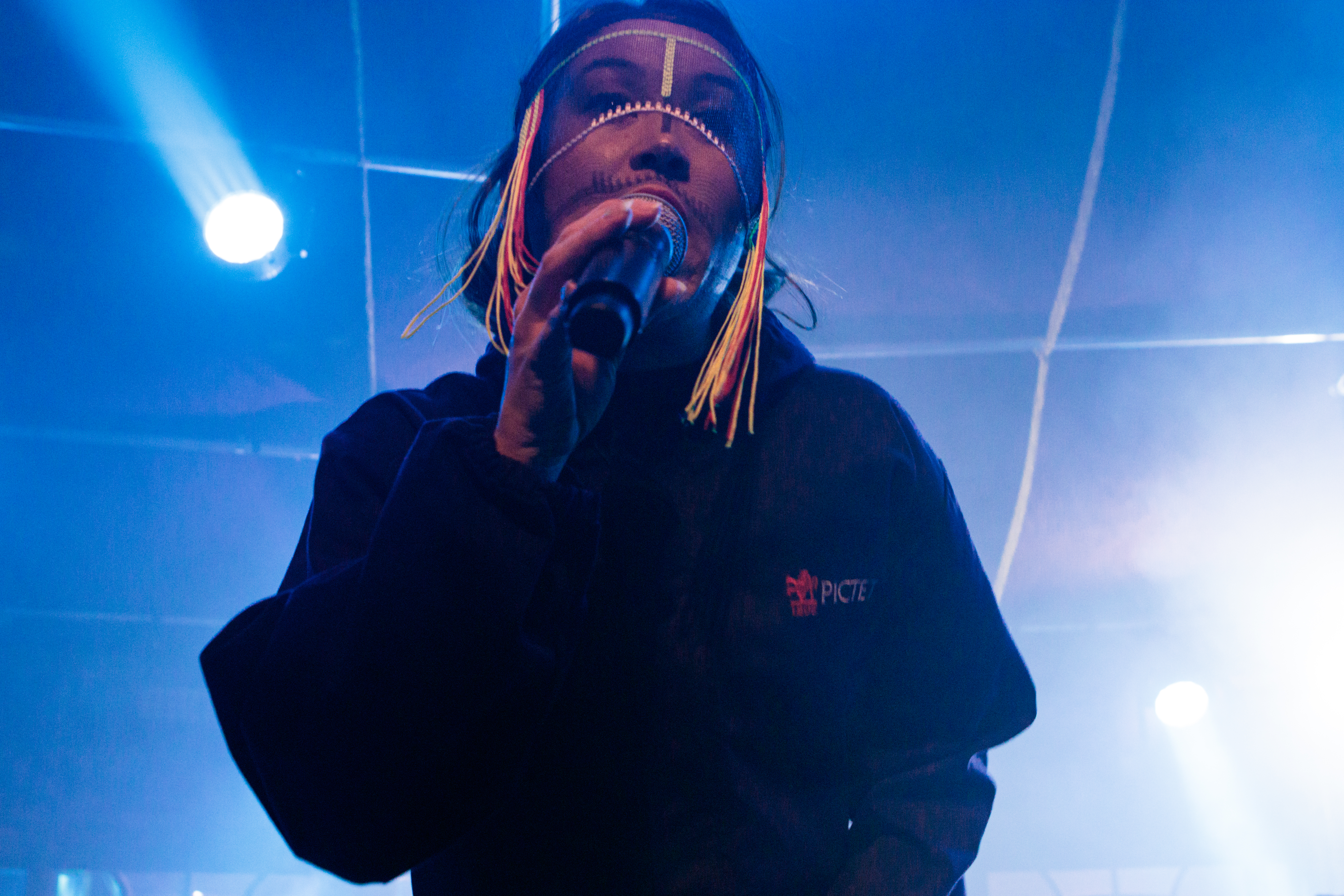
Claire Nakazawa

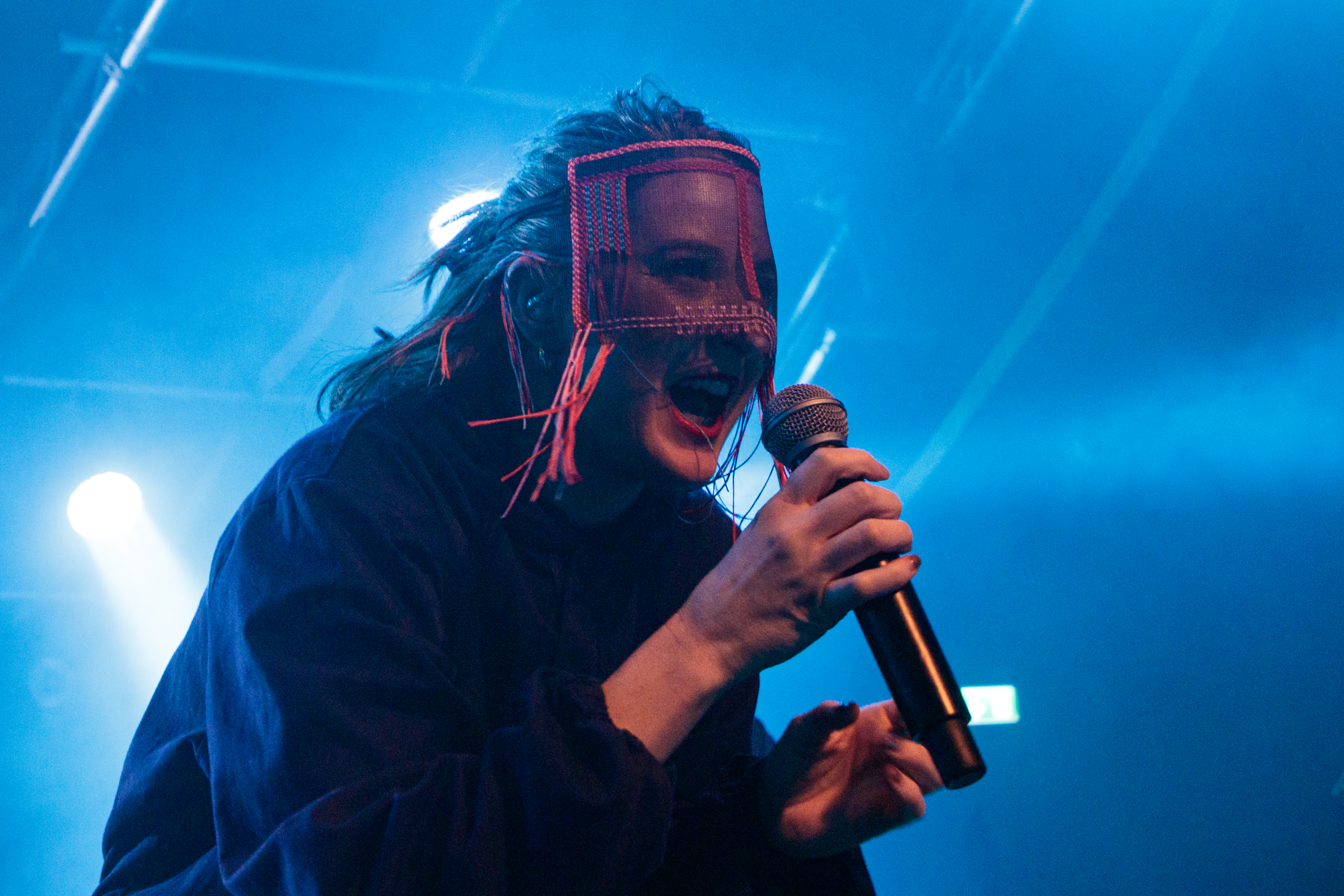
Beatrice Lewis

== Discography ==
=== Studio albums ===
List of studio albums, with release date and label shown
Title	Album details
Haiku Hands	Released: 11 September 2020; Label: Mad Decent, Caroline Music Australia; Formats: Digital download, streaming
Pleasure Beast	Released: 1 December 2023; Label: Spinning Top; Formats: digital download, streaming

=== Singles ===
List of singles, with year released and album name shown
Title	Year	Album
"Not About You" (Note: "Not About You" and "Jupiter" were later included on their debut album Haiku Hands.)	2017	Non-album singles
"Jupiter" (Note: "Not About You" and "Jupiter" were later included on their debut album Haiku Hands.)	2018	Non-album singles
"Squat" (featuring True Vibenation)	2018	Non-album singles
"Dare You Not to Dance"	2019	Non-album singles
"Onset" (featuring Mad Zach)	2019	Non-album singles
"Manbitch"	2020	Haiku Hands
"Fashion Model Art" (featuring Sofi Tukker)	2020	Haiku Hands
"Suck My Cherry"	2020	Freaky: Music from the Motion Picture
"Conclusions"	2021	Non-album singles
"Bye Bye"	2022	Non-album singles
"Nunchucka"	2023	Pleasure Beast
"Feels So Good"	2023	Pleasure Beast
"Kicks"	2024	Pleasure Beast (Deluxe)
"Freak Out" (with Baker Boy and Briggs)	2025	Djandjay

== Awards and nominations ==
=== AIR Awards ===
The Australian Independent Record Awards (commonly known informally as AIR Awards) is an annual awards night to recognise, promote and celebrate the success of Australia's Independent Music sector.

Year	Nominee / work	Award	Result	Ref.
2020	"Dare You Not to Dance"	Best Independent Dance or Electronica Single	Nominated	
2021	Haiku Hands	Breakthrough Independent Artist of the Year	Nominated	
2021	Haiku Hands	Best Independent Dance or Electronica Album or EP	Nominated	
2024	Pleasure Beast	Best Independent Dance or Electronica Album or EP	Nominated	
2025	"Kicks"	Best Independent Dance, Electronica or Club Single	Nominated	
