= Sender (band) =

Australian band

- Also known as: Zenyth
- Origin: Bendigo, Victoria, Australia
- Genres: Rock
- Years active: 1995–2014
- Label: Sony Music
- Past members: Bohdan Dower; Michael Fitt; Tom Mewett; Nathan Schifferle; James Addlem

Sender were an Australian rock band from Bendigo. Formed as Zenyth in 1995, they were the Victorian state winner of the Commonwealth Youth Affairs National Battle of the Bands in 1999. The line-up was Bohdan Dower on lead vocals, Michael Fitt on bass guitar, Tom Mewett on drums and Nathan Schifferle on guitar. The members were attending Bendigo Senior Secondary College. In 2001 they self-released an extended play (EP), Threedoublefivesix. They were the MusicOZ Artist of the year in 2001.

Zenyth changed their name to Sender and signed with Sony Music Australia in 2003. In 2004 they released a self-titled EP, The single "You're On Fire" debuted at No. 68 on the ARIA charts, peaking at No. 63. By 2005 Schifferle had been replaced by James Addlem on guitar. In 2007 the band released a web-only single, "Sleepwalker" on Bebo.com. Sender produced and recorded their debut album, No Way Out, which was released on their own label on 10 April 2010. Sender disbanded in 2014, playing their last gig at the Golden Vine Hotel in Bendigo. Dower told Chris Pedler of Bendigo Advertiser, "I hadn't made the effort to evolve the band's music and I was keen on exploring some solo stuff."

== Discography ==
=== Albums ===
List of albums, with selected details
Title	Details
No Way Out	Released: 2010; Format: CD, digital

=== Extended plays ===
List of EPs, with selected details
Title	Details
Threedoublefivesix (as Zenyth')	Released: May 2001; Format: CD
Sender	Released: 2004; Format: CD

=== Charting singles ===
List of singles, with selected chart positions
Title	Year	Peak chart positions	Album
Title	Year	AUS	Album
"You're On Fire"	2004	63	Sender
