= Anna Lunoe =

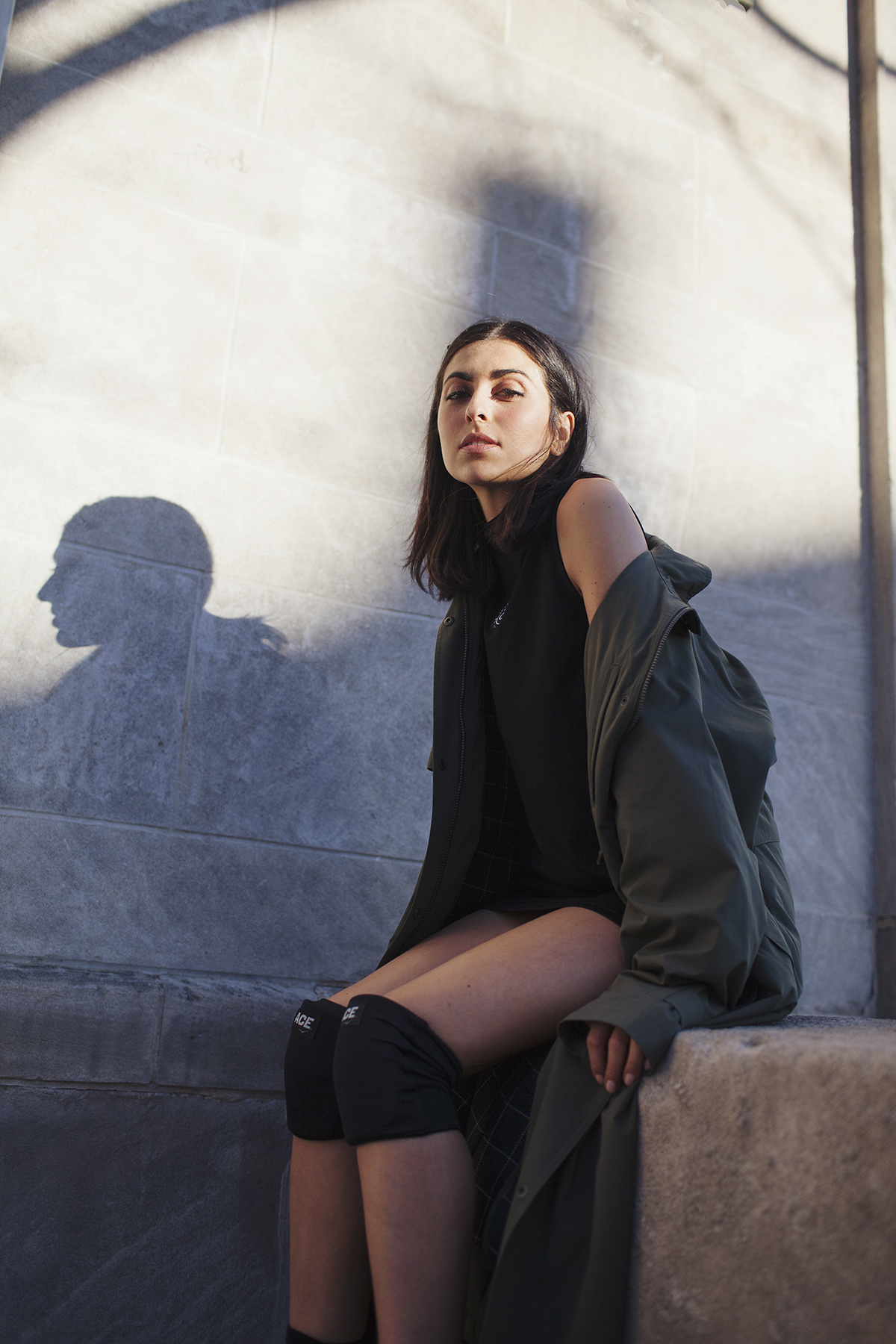
- Lunoe in 2015

Background information
- Born: May 26, 1986 (age 40)
- Origin: Sydney
- Genre: EDM
- Occupations: DJ; singer; songwriter; producer
- Instruments: Synthesizer; drum machine; music sequencer; personal computer
- Years active: 2010–present
- Labels: Owsla; Ultra Records; Spinnin' Deep; Sweat It Out

Anna Lunoe is an Australian DJ, vocalist, songwriter and producer now living in Los Angeles, California. Lunoe has performed at music festivals including Coachella, Lollapalooza, Ultra, TomorrowWorld and Hard Summer. She now hosts a weekly show on Apple Music 1.

== Early life ==
Anna Lunoe was born in Sydney, Australia. Originally of Danish and Lebanese descent, Lunoe grew up songwriting on her acoustic guitar. She began her music career as host of a dance show at FBi RADIO, an independent youth broadcaster in Sydney. She later became the first woman to mix for Ministry of Sound Australia. During her time at Ministry of Sound, she produced three compilations, which all went Gold in Australia and topped the Beatport Indie Dance Compilation Chart.

== Career ==
In early 2012, Lunoe relocated to Los Angeles to pursue her career. Shortly after arriving, Lunoe broke into the EDM world with her debut EP, Anna Lunoe & Friends, featuring Flume and Touch Sensitive. "Real Talk" received the No. 1 spot on the Beatport Indie Dance Chart for four months.. "I Met You", her collaborative effort with Flume, currently has over 4 million views on YouTube.

In 2014, "Bass Drum Dealer (B.D.D.)" was picked up by Skrillex for a release on his Nest imprint. She also released a Zane Lowe-premiered collaboration "Feels Like" with Totally Enormous Extinct Dinosaurs. After a festival run and 2-month US tour with The Weeknd, Lunoe's second EP, All Out, debuted at No. 4 on the iTunes Dance Chart.

In early 2015, she released "Pusher", alongside Sleepy Tom. To follow up, Lunoe teamed with Chris Lake to produce "Stomper".

On 18 June 2016, Lunoe made history by becoming the first solo female DJ to perform at Electric Daisy Carnival Las Vegas' main stage.

In April 2017, Lunoe announced that she was pregnant via an Instagram post, and proceeded to perform at the Coachella Valley Music and Arts Festival that weekend.

In 2019 and 2022, two of her songs were included in different Need for Speed video games, first the instrumental version of "303" in the installment "Heat" and later "Ice Cream" (with Nakamura Minami) in "Unbound".

On 27 February 2025, Lunoe released the single, "Girl", in collaboration with Melanie C.

== Additional work ==
In May 2015, Lunoe was approached by Zane Lowe of Beats 1 to work with a group of artists including Dr. Dre, Pharrell, Elton John and Drake on Apple's launch of Apple Music. Lunoe now hosts her own weekly program entitled Anna Lunoe Presents: HYPERHOUSE, broadcasting live to over 100 countries every Friday at 9PM PT/12AM ET on Beats 1 Radio. She has brought on dance acts such as Jamie XX, Diplo, Kaskade, Boys Noize, What So Not, Tokimonsta and many more.

In 2016, Lunoe launched her own touring and music platform, HYPERHOUSE, curating stages for thousands of fans at music festivals such as HolyShip and WMC along with a 15 city tour, bringing along Sleepy Tom, DJ Sliink, Rezz, Wuki and San Holo.

In 2019, Lunoe launched a new show on Apple Music titled danceXL.

== Discography ==
=== Albums ===
List of albums, with selected chart positions
Title	Album details	Peak chart positions
Title	Album details	AUS Artist
Pearl	Released: 25 October 2024; Label: NLVR (NLVR0225)	20

=== Extended plays ===
List of EPs, with selected details
Title	Details
All Out	Released: September 2014; Label: Ultra Records
Right Party	Released: June 2019; Label: Mad Decent / Sweat It Out!

== Awards and nominations ==
=== Environmental Music Prize ===
The Environmental Music Prize is a quest to find a theme song to inspire action on climate and conservation. It commenced in 2022.

Year	Nominee / work	Award	Result	Ref.
2025	"Deep Blue Sea"	Environmental Music Prize	Nominated	
