= Kuren (singer) =

- Born: Curtis Kennedy; 29 January 1998 (age 27); Hillston, Australia
- Genres: Electronica, Trap,
- Labels: One Two Records, UNIFIED Music Group

Curtis Kennedy, who performs as Kuren, is an Australian singer, musician, record producer and rapper from Sydney, Australia. He has performed at Splendour in the Grass, and Southbound. He released his debut album Melting Conceptually in June 2018.

== Discography ==
=== Singles ===
- Home Featuring (Ben Alessi)
- Mon Amour (Feat Austen)
- Mastercraft
- Bright Dawn
- Never Enough
- KILL

=== EPs ===
- Love Lost
- Tesseract

=== Studio albums ===
- Melting Conceptually

=== Remixes ===
- Indian Summer 'Been Here Before' ft Eloise Cleary (Kuren Remix)
