= Boo Seeka =

Australian solo project

- Origin: Sydney, New South Wales, Australia
- Genre: Electropop
- Years active: 2015–present
- Labels: Sureshaker (2015–2019); Warner Music Australia (2017– 2020); Disrupt Music Group (2020+)
- Members: Ben Gumbleton
- Past members: Sam Croft; Michael May
- Website: www.booseeka.com

Boo Seeka is the solo project of Australian electropop singer-songwriter, Ben "Boo" Gumbleton. Boo Seeka have released three studio albums.

== History ==
=== 2015-2018: Beginnings and Never Too Soon ===
Boo Seeka's debut single "Kingdom Leader" was released in January 2015.

In 2015, Boo Seeka covered MØ's "Pilgrim", which was included on Like a Version compilation. Boo Seeka was nominated for Unearthed Artist of the Year at the J Awards in 2015. In January 2016, their single "Deception Bay" was ranked at number 50 on the Triple J Hottest 100, 2015.

The band list Massive Attack, Mayer Hawthorne and Cody Chesnutt as influences.

On 4 August 2017, Boo Seeka released their debut album, Never Too Soon, which peaked at number 8 on the ARIA Charts.

=== 2020-present: Between the Head & the Heart ===
In May 2020, upon the release of "Take a Look", Gumbleton confirmed an upcoming second album.

On 22 June 2021, Gumbleton said that he and May had parted ways due to "fundamental differences" and Boo Seeka would now be a solo project.

Boo Seeka's second album, Between the Head & the Heart was released on 30 June 2022.

In October 2023, Boo Seeka announced the forthcoming release of their third studio album Midnight Highlight. In the following months Boo Seeka supported Boy & Bear on their tour of Europe.

== Members ==
=== Current ===
- Ben Gumbleton (2015–present)

=== Previous ===
- Sam Croft (2015-2018)
- Michael May (2019-2021)

== Discography ==
=== Studio albums ===
Title	Album details	Peak chart positions
Title	Album details	AUS
Never Too Soon	Released: 4 August 2017; Label: Sureshaker, Warner Music Australia; Formats: CD, LP, digital download, streaming	8
Between the Head & the Heart	Released: 20 June 2022; Label: Disrupt Music Group; Formats: LP, digital download, streaming	—
Midnight Highlight	Released: 19 January 2024; Label: Sony Music Australia; Formats: Digital download, streaming	—
Cigarettes on Sundown	Released: 23 October 2026; Label: Community Music; Formats: LP, digital download, streaming	10

=== Certified singles ===
List of certified singles
Title	Year	Certifications	Album
"Does This Last"	2017	ARIA: Gold	Never Too Soon

==== Other appearances ====
List of other appearances year released and album shown
Title	Year	Album
"Free" (Hayden James featuring Boo Seeka)	2022	Lifted

== Awards and nominations ==
=== J Awards ===
The J Awards are an annual series of Australian music awards that were established by the Australian Broadcasting Corporation's youth-focused radio station Triple J. They commenced in 2005.

Year	Nominee / work	Award	Result
J Awards of 2015	themselves	Unearthed Artist of the Year	Nominated
