= List of festivals in Australia =

The following is a list of festivals in Australia, including any established festival or carnival in Australia.

== Australian Capital Territory ==
Name	Location	Began	Dates	Notes
Art, Not Apart	Canberra	2010	March	Multi-Arts Festival (Website)
AusFest (Australian Independent Music Festival)	Canberra & Queanbeyan	2006	January	Australian and international Indie performers, arts and dance (previously in Melbourne, Adelaide & Brisbane) (Website)
Australia Day Live	Lawns of Parliament House, Canberra	1999	25 January	Starts with Australian of the Year award, followed by music and top acts. (Website)
Australian Science Festival	Canberra	1993	August	Week-long science festival held annually in May. (Website)
Canberra Balloon Spectacular	Canberra	1986	March	Formally known as Canberra Balloon Festival (Canberra Balloon Spectacular)
Canberra Comedy Festival	Canberra	2013	March	Local, Australian and International comedy acts. (Website)
Canberra Country Blues & Roots Festival	Hall	2009	November	Originally established as the Canberra Country Music Festival (Website)
Canberra District Wine Harvest Festival	Various venues across Canberra and the surrounding region	1990s	April	Wine festival held annually in April. (Website)
Canberra Craft Beer & Cider Festival	Canberra	2008	March	Beer & cider festival. (Website)
Canberra International Film Festival	Acton	1996	October–November	International film festival. (Website)
Canberra International Music Festival	Various venues across Canberra	1997	April–May	Chamber, classical, jazz, contemporary and world music festival (Website)
Canberra Nara Candle Festival	Canberra	2003	October	Japanese cultural festival (Website)
Canberra Writers Festival	Canberra	2016	August	Website
Enlighten Festival	Parliamentary Triangle	2011	First two weekends of March	Annual art and cultural festival, held in the evening (Website)
Fireside Festival	Canberra region	2006	July–August	Winter festival with food, wine and music. (Website)
Floriade	Commonwealth Park	1988	September–October	Flower and entertainment festival held annually. (Website)
Foreshore Summer Music Festival	Parliamentary Triangle	2007	November	Pop, electronic, indie, rock & hip-hop music.
Groovin the Moo	Canberra and various locations nationally	2005	May	Dance and music (Website)
Irish Film Festival Australia	Canberra (and across Australia)	2015	October-November	Annual national arts festival featuring Irish films. (Website)
National Folk Festival	Canberra	1967	5-Days over Easter	Folk music, dance, and arts festival. Workshops and sessions day/night. Held in various cities across Australia from 1967 to 1991. Held in Canberra annually since 1992 (Website)
National Multicultural Festival	Various venues – Civic, Canberra	1997	February	Arts, Music, Comedy, Parades, food and wine, street parties, exhibitions etc., held over three days. (Website)
Skyfire	Central Basin, Lake Burley Griffin	1988	March	Fireworks festival. (Website)
Sydney Spring International Festival of New Music	Sydney	1990	September	Dedicated to contemporary classical music. The Festival was held from 1990 to 2001 (twelve editions in total)
Summernats	Exhibition Park in Canberra (EPIC), Lyneham	1988	January	Car festival. (Website)
Stonefest	University of Canberra	2001	January	Rock music festival
Summer and Winter Festivals of Peace	Stage 88, Commonwealth Park	1994		Music and Peace festival
Summer Rhythm Festival	Goolabri, Sutton	2009	December	3 days, music, camping, and market stalls.
Trackside Festival	Thoroughbred Park (Canberra Racecourse), Lyneham	2009	November	Music, stores, carnival rides, international food & drink and market stalls
The Truffle Festival Canberra Region	Various locations – Canberra region	2003	July–August	
Tuggeranong Festival	Tuggeranong	1988	November	(Website)
Wine, Roses and all that Jazz	Various locations – Canberra region	2007	November	Wine and jazz festival

== New South Wales ==
Festival	Location	Began	Notes
Ardlethan German Beer and Wine Festival	Ardlethan	2007	German beer and wine festival held in July/August. (Website)
Arts in the Valley	Kangaroo Valley	2007	Classical music, arts festival held in May/June. (Website)
Australian Beer Festival	The Rocks	2005	Beer festival held annually in October. (Website)
Bankstown Bites Food Festival	Bankstown	2005	Food festival held annually in July. (Website)
Batlow CiderFest	Batlow	2012	Cider festival held on the third weekend in May. (Website)
Bellingen Fine Music Festival	Bellingen	September annually	Local to internationally known artists from classical, world, and jazz music traditions
Bellingen Readers & Writers Festival	Bellingen	2011	Writers festival. (Website)
Bello Winter Music	Bellingen	2015	Held in July yearly. (Website)
Biennale of Sydney	Various venues, Sydney	1973	Contemporary visual arts festival. Held every two years. (Website)
Bitter and Twisted Boutique Beer Festival	East Maitland		Annual beer festival held in November. (Website)
Big Day Out	Various venues, nationally	1992	Annual summer music festival. (Website)
Blackheath Rhododendron Festival	Blackheath	1953	Annual festival held in late October to early November. (Website)
Blacktown City Festival	Blacktown	1975	Annual festival held in May. Originated as the Crafty Bunyip Festival, changing to the Blacktown City Festival in 1979. Includes the Blacktown City Medieval Fayre held at Nurragingy Reserve, Doonside. (Website)
The Blue Mountains Ukulele Festival	Katoomba	2010	Held annually over the second weekend in February. (Website)
Byron Bay Bluesfest	Byron Bay	1990–2026	Blues music and cultural festival. Held annually over the Easter break. (Website)
Brigadoon	Bundanoon	1977	Annual Scottish festival held in April. (Website)
Bondi Short Film Festival	Bondi Beach	2001	Held annually in November. (Website)
Bring It On! Festival	Prairiewood, Sydney	2003	Music, sporting and arts festival, held annually at the end of National Youth Week in April. (Website)
Brisbane Water Oyster Festival	Ettalong Beach	2000	Held annually in November. (Website)
Byron Bay Film Festival	Byron Bay	2006	International Film Festival. (Website)
Byron Bay Surf Festival	Byron Bay	2010	Surf Culture Festival. (Website)
Byron Spirit Festival	Mullumbimby	2012	Yoga, Tantra, Music, Dance, Healing. (Website)
Byron Underwater Festival	Byron Bay	2007	Underwater Festival, Photography & Arts
Casino Beef Week	Casino	1982	Annual beef industry and community festival. (Website)
CoastFest	Gosford		Music and cultural Festival
Coffs Harbour International Buskers & Comedy Festival	Coffs Harbour	2001	Annual festival of street theatre and performers. Held annually in late September to early October. (Website)
Collector Village Pumpkin Festival	Collector	2003	Pumpkin themed country festival. Held annually in May. (Website)
Crows Nest Fest	Crows Nest	1991	
Crookwell Potato Festival	Crookwell	2011	Potato themed festival held in May. (Website)
Curryfest	Woolgoolga	2006	Cultural, music, dance and food festival. (Website)
Darling Harbour Fiesta	Darling Harbour, Sydney	1993	Latin music, dance, food and culture, held annually in October. (Website)
Defqon.1 Festival	Penrith	2009	Hardstyle electronic music festival, held annually in September up until 2018. Festival also held in the Netherlands since 2003 and Chile since 2015. (Website)
Deniliquin Ute Muster	Deniliquin	1999	The Deniliquin Ute Muster and Play on the Plains Festival is held on the October Labour Day long weekend. (Website)
Electrofringe	Sydney	1998	Annual electronic arts festival and community organisation. Formerly held in Newcastle 1998–2014. (Website)
Festival of Dangerous Ideas	Sydney	2009	Discussions and debates held annually at the Sydney Opera House. (Website)
Festival Fatale	Sydney	2016	Women's theatre festival at the Eternity Playhouse
Festival of Fisher's Ghost	Campbelltown	1956	Held annually in November: Arts, Music, Street Parade, Carnival, Cultural activities. (Website)
Festival of the Sun	Port Macquarie	2001	Outdoor music festival held in December. (Website)
Festival of the Winds	Bondi Beach, Sydney	1978	Kite Flying, Media Arts. Held annually in September. (Website)
FOMO Festival	Parramatta Park	2017	Music festival. (Website)
Folk by the Sea	Kiama	2013	Folk music festival, held annually in September. (Website)
Future Music Festival	Randwick Racecourse, Sydney	2006	Electro House Music
Granny Smith Festival	Eastwood, Sydney	1985	Apple themed festival celebrating local pioneer Maria Ann "Granny" Smith. Held annually in October. (Website)
The Gum Ball	Belford, Hunter Valley	2005	Music Festival. (Website)
The Good Dog! International Film Festival	Sydney	2012	Annual film festival featuring dogs. (Website)
The Henry Lawson Festival	Grenfell	1958	Annual arts festival held over the June long weekend. (Website)
Head On Photo Festival	Sydney	2010	Annual international photography festival (Website)
Holi Mahotsav	Darling Harbour, Sydney	2003	Annual cultural festival held in March. (Website)
Hunter Valley Steamfest	Maitland	1986	Steam Locomotive Festival held in April. (Website)
i4Give Festival	Prince Alfred Square, Parramatta	2023	Non-sequential festival promoting forgiveness.
Ignite Film Festival	Sydney	2004	Christian short film festival. (Website)
Irish Film Festival Australia	Sydney (and across Australia)	2015	Annual national festival held across October and early November featuring Irish films. (Website)
Illawarra Folk Festival	Bulli, Wollongong	1985	Annual international folk festival held on the 3rd weekend in January. (Website)
Lakemba Nights during Ramadan	Lakemba	2007	Multi-cultural food festival.
Let's Go Greek Festival	Parramatta	2014	Annual Greek cultural festival. (Website)
Ironfest	Lithgow	2000	Annual iron themed, historical and cultural festival held in April. (Website)
Jacaranda Festival	Grafton	1935	Folk festival held in late October to early November (Website)
KISS Arts Festival (Kiama International Seaside Arts Festival)	Kiama	2012	Annual festival held in April. Comedy, Music, Circus & Performance (Website)
Lanterns on the Lagoon and Sculptures in the Park	Tumut	2011	Festival focused on sustainable art and sculpture. (Website)
Maitland Indie Festival	Maitland	2020	Annual festival. The Maitland Indie Festival started in 2020, with its primary focus being on supporting local, independent literature, writing and music markets. (Website)
Malaysia Festival (MFest)	Pyrmont, Sydney	1990	Annual community and Malaysian cultural festival. (Website)
Merimbula Jazz Festival	Merimbula	1981	Jazz music Festival, held over the June long weekend. (Website)
Mullum Music Festival	Mullumbimby	2008	The biggest little festival happens each November (Website)
Mudgee Wine and Food Festival	Mudgee		Annual wine and food festival, held in September to early October. (Website)
Mulwala Rock Isle Festival	Mulwala	Easter weekend 1972	Rock Festival. Rain turned the Camp site into a quagmire and the final day was cancelled. (Website)
National Young Writers' Festival	Newcastle	1998	Writers Festival. (Website)
Newcastle Music Festival	Newcastle	2016	Annual fine music festival for classical, jazz and other genres, invited local and international performers. Festival Choir and Festival Orchestra opportunities for community members. (Website)
Newcastle Writers' Festival	Newcastle	2013	Annual writers festival with packed program of events, mostly free to the community. Range of writers and speakers on diverse topics. (Website)
Newton's Nation	Bathurst	2008	Annual gravity sports and music festival, formally known as Newton's Playground. (Website)
Newtown Festival	Newtown, Sydney	1978	Annual community festival which ran from 1978 to 2019. (Website)
O'Heart Festival	Tyalgum	2016	Three day long festival. Held mid to late August. (Website)
Orange Blossom Festival	Castle Hill	1960	Held annually in September. (Website)
Parramasala	Parramatta	2010	South Asian multicultural festival held in March. (Website)
Parkes Elvis Festival	Parkes	1993	Elvis Music Festival held annually in January. (Website)
Parramatta Lanes	Parramatta	2012	Street festival (Website)
Peak Festival	Perisher Valley	2009	Music festival held over the June long weekend. (Website)
Pohela Boishakh	Sydney Olympic Park	2008	Bengali New Year festival celebrated on 14 April.
Roaring 20s and all that Jazz Festival	Blue Mountains – Various locations	2013	1920s themed festival. Month-long event held in February. (Website)
Rootstock Sydney	Eveleigh, Sydney	2013	Sustainable food and wine festival. Held annually in November. (Website)
St Albans Folk Festival	St Albans	1980	Traditional and contemporary folk music festival, held annually in late April. (Website)
Scone Horse Festival	Scone	1980	Horse themed community festival held annually in October. Includes the Scone Cup. (Website)
See Change Festival	Jervis Bay area	2000	Biennial arts festival held in the Jervis Bay and St Georges Basin area, of the City of Shoalhaven, in late May and early June. (Website)
Shore Thing	Bondi Beach	2005	Annual New Year's Eve festival. (Website)
Spectrum Now Festival	Sydney – Various venues	2015	Art, Music, Stage, Talks and exhibitions. Held annually in March. (Website)
Splendour in the Grass	North Byron Parklands, Yelgun	2001	Music festival – Indie rock, hip hop, electronic, alternative. Held annually in July/August. (Website)
Stereosonic	Sydney Olympic Park	2007	Electronic and dance music festival (Website)
Sunburnt Christmas	Bondi Beach, Sydney	2002	Christmas Day Music Festival. (Website)
Surfing the Coldstream Festival	Yamba	2008	Annual festival held annually in October - Arts, music, film, entertainment. (Website)
Sydney Blues and Roots Festival	Windsor	2009	Music festival, held annually in October. (Website)
Sydney Cherry Blossom Festival	Auburn Botanic Gardens, Auburn, Sydney	2011	Held annually in August. (Website)
Sydney Children's Festival	First Fleet Park, The Rocks, Sydney	2008	Held annually in March. (Website)
Sydney Chinese New Year Festival	Sydney	1997	Annual festival held annually in January to February. (Website)
Sydney Comedy Festival	Sydney – Various venues	2005	Annual comedy festival held in April–May. (Website)
Sydney Craft Beer Week	Sydney – Various venues	2012	Beer Festival. (Website)
Sydney Festival	Sydney	1977	Major Arts Festival, held between first and last week of January, annually. (Website)
Sydney Film Festival	Sydney	1954	Annual film festival, held in June. (Website)
Sydney Fringe Festival	Various locations – Inner West, Sydney	1994 (2010 in current format)	Alternative arts and culture festival (Website)
Sydney Gay and Lesbian Mardi Gras	Sydney	24 June 1978	Festival, Parade and Party, during February/March annually. (Website)
Sydney International Piano Competition	Sydney	1977	International Piano Competition held every four years: 1981, 1985, 1988 (to coincide with the Australian Bicentennial celebrations), 1992, 1996, 2000, 2004 and 2012. (Website)
Sydney St Patrick's Day Festival	The Rocks	1790s in various forms. 1970s in current format.	Irish themed festival, currently held on weekends around 17 March. (Early history)(Website)
Sydney Underground Film Festival	Sydney	2006	Alternative, independent and experimental film festival. Held annually in Sydney at the Factory Theatre in Marrickville and in 2020 & 2021 streamed online due to COVID (Website)
Sydney Writers' Festival	Sydney	1997	Annual literary festival, held mid - late May. (Website)
Tamworth Country Music Festival	Tamworth	1973	Annual Country Music festival, held in January. (Website)
Taste of the World Beer Fest	New Lambton, Newcastle	2011	Annual beer festival in January. (Website)
Thirlmere Festival of Steam	Thirlmere	1989	Age of steam themed annual community festival, held in March. (Website)
This Is Not Art	Newcastle	1998	Independent contemporary arts festival, held annually in late September to early October. (Website)
Thredbo Jazz Festival	Thredbo	1987	Annual Jazz Music festival, held in May (Website)
Tropfest & Trop Jr	Parramatta, Sydney	1993	Short Film festival held in February. (Website)
Tulip Time	Bowral	1960	Annual spring festival. (Website)
Tweed Valley Banana Festival	Murwillumbah	1956	Last week in August each year. (Website)
Uranquinty Folk Festival	Uranquinty, Wagga Wagga	1970	Folk music festival, held annually on the October Labour Day long weekend. Originated as the Wagga Wagga Folk Festival held at Downside, until moving to Uranquinty in 1974. (Website)
Village Fair	Bathurst	1974	Music Festival – Rock, Alternative, Indie, Hip hop, Electronic.
Vivid Sydney	Sydney	2009	Annual outdoor lighting festival, held from May to June. (Website)
Wahroonga Food and Wine Festival	Wahroonga	2013	Annual food and wine festival. (Website)
Warners Bay Beer Festival	Warners Bay, Newcastle	2009	Beer Festival
Winter Magic Festival	Katoomba	1994	Annual festival celebrated around the Winter Solstice in June. (Website)

== Northern Territory ==
Festival	Location	Began / When	Notes
Alice Desert Festival	Alice Springs and the surrounding region	2000	Arts and cultural festival
Darwin Beer Can Regatta	Darwin	1974	Beer boat race
Darwin Festival	Darwin	1978	Arts and cultural festival
Darwin Fringe Festival	Darwin	2015	Arts and cultural festival
Henley-on-Todd Regatta	Alice Springs	1962	"Boat" race on the dry Todd River
Garma Festival of Traditional Cultures	Arnhem Land	1998	Celebration of the cultural inheritance of the Yolngu people.
Pure Sounds In The Park	Darwin	2009	Music festival
Bassinthegrass	Darwin	2003	Music festival
Bassinthedust	Alice Springs	2003	Music festival
Isotopia Festival	Darwin	2005	Music festival

== Queensland ==
Name	Location	Began	Date	Notes
Anywhere Theatre Festival	Brisbane	2011	May	Annual
Australian Festival of Chamber Music	Townsville	1991		
Apple & Grape Harvest Festival	Stanthorpe	1966	March	Biannual
Australian Italian Festival	Ingham	1995	First weekend in June	Annual A two-day festival celebrating Italian culture (Website)
Beef Australia	Rockhampton	1988	May	National Beef Exposition – Triennial
BeerFestABull	Innes Park	2010	22–23 September 2012	Annual
Big Day Out	Gold Coast	1994	January	Annual
Big Red Bash	Birdsville		July	Annual
Bleach*	Coolangatta	2010		Annual
Blues on Broadbeach Music Festival	Broadbeach	2002	May	Annual
Bris Funny Fest	Brisbane	2016	August	Annual fringe comedy festival
Brisbane Festival	Brisbane	1996	September–October	Annual
Brisbane International Film Festival	Brisbane	1992		Annual
Brisbane International Youth Music Festival	Brisbane	2012		
Brisbane Pride Festival	Brisbane	1990		Annual
Brisbane Writers Festival	Brisbane	1962	September	
Broadbeach Country Music Festival	Broadbeach	2012	August	Annual
Broadbeach Jazz Festival	Broadbeach	2012	August	Annual
Burleigh Heads Single Fin Festival	Burleigh Heads	2010		Annual
Buskers by the Lake	Lake Kawana, Sunshine Coast	2014	October	Annual
Cardwell UFO Festival	Cardwell	2014	Third Saturday in October	Annual
Cairns Festival	Cairns	1962	12 August–4 September	Annual
Cairns Winter Solstice Festival	Mount Garnet	2006	12–15 June	Annual
Cairns Ukulele Festival	Cairns	2010	July	Annual
Caloundra Music Festival	Caloundra	2007	28–30 September	Annual
Camooweal Drover's Camp Festival	Camooweal	1996	Fourth weekend of August	Annual
Capricorn Food & Wine Festival	Rockhampton	2013	September	Annual
Carnival of Flowers	Toowoomba	1950	September	Annual
Caxton Street Seafood and Wine Festival	Brisbane	1994		Annual
Centenary Rocks! Festival	Brisbane	2003	Last weekend of July	Annual
Childers Festival	Childers	1996	July	Annual
Cooly Rocks On	Coolangatta/Tweed Heads	2011	June	
Dead of Winter Festival	Brisbane	2009	June	Annual
Dingo Creek Jazz and Blues Festival	Traveston (near Gympie)	2002	Varies	Annual
Dirt n Dust Festival	Julia Creek	1995	April	Annual
Earth Roots Culture Festival	Brisbane	2017	Varies	Annual
Easterfest	Toowoomba	1999	Varies	Annual
The Dreaming	Woodford	2005	June	International indigenous festival
FOMO Festival	Brisbane	2016	January	Annual (Website)
The GarterBelts and Gasoline Nostalgia Festival	Mount Tamborine	2002		Annual
Gayndah Orange Festival	Gayndah	1990	June	Bi-Annual
Gemfest	The Gemfields	1988	August	Annual
Gigs & Digs Festival	Emerald	2017	August	Annual
Gladstone Harbour Festival	Gladstone	1962	Easter weekend	Annual
Go Troppo Arts Festival	Port Douglas	2008	October	
Gold Coast International Food, Wine and Music Festival	Robina	2002		Annual
Gold Coast Film Festival	Gold Coast	2002	April	Annual
Golden Days Festival	Coolum	2010	19 & 20 November 2011	Annual
Golden Mount Festival	Mount Morgan	1977	Labour Day weekend in May	Annual
Gympie Muster	Amamoor Forest Reserve	1982		Annual
Irish Film Festival Australia	Brisbane (and across Australia)	2015	October-November	Annual national arts festival featuring Irish films. (Website)
Island Elements Festival	Adder Rock, North Stradbroke Island	2015	23–25 October	Annual
Island Vibe Festival	Home Beach, North Stradbroke Island	2006	30 October–1 November	Annual
Jungle Love	Imbil, Queensland	2014	End of November	Music and arts festival
Kenilworth Celebrates!	Kenilworth	1997	September/October	Annual
Kenilworth Cheese, Wine and Food Fest	Kenilworth	2009	Easter Saturday	Annual
Kirra Kite Festival	Kirra	2000	July	Annual
Livid	Brisbane	1989-2003		Annual
Mary Valley Art Festival	Imbil	2000	July	Annual
May Day Fair	Blackwater		Labour Day weekend in May	Annual
Miles Back to the Bush Festival	Miles	2018	September	Biennial
Milking the Cow Beer Lovers Festival	Toowoomba	2010	June	Annual
Moura Coal & Country Festival	Moura	1971	August	Annual
Noosa Jazz Festival	Noosa	1992	September	Annual
Noosa Festival of Surfing	Noosa	1992	Late February/early March	Annual
Noosa Long Weekend Festival	Noosa	July 2001	July	Annual
Oktoberfest Brisbane	Brisbane	2002	October	Annual
Pop Up North Queensland (PUNQ) Festival	Townsville, Magnetic Island, Hinchinbrook Island, and Charters Towers	2017	July–August	Biennial
Port Douglas Carnivale	Port Douglas	1994	May	Annual
Queensland Beer Week	Queensland	2010	June	Annual
Queensland Music Festival	Queensland	1999		Biennial
Queensland Poetry Festival	Brisbane	1997	Last weekend of August	Annual
Redlands Spring Festival	Brisbane	1958	September	Annual
Reggaetown World Music Festival	Cairns	1987	10 & 11 September	Annual
Ripe	Noosa	2009		
River Sessions	Mackay	2009	July	Annual
Rockhampton River Festival	Rockhampton	2015	July	Annual
Screen It International Film Festival (SIFF)	Gold Coast	2014	September	Annual
Sea N Beats	Brisbane	2016	5–8 March	Annual
Shockwave Festival	Blackall	2014	2–3 August	Annual
Soundwave	Brisbane			Annual
Splendour in the Grass	Woodford	2010 & 2011	July	Held near Woodford in 2010 & 2011; usually Byron Bay
SPRUKE – Brisbane's Ukulele Festival	Brisbane	2013	Spring (usually late September or early October)	Biennial (Website)
Straight Out of Brisbane	Brisbane	2002		
STUFFit Student Film Festival	Sunshine Coast	2012	October	Student film festival, annual
Sunshine Coast Ukulele Fest	Sunshine Coast/Kenilworth	2014	14–17 April 2016	Annual (Website)
Surfers Paradise Festival	Surfers Paradise	??		Annual
Swell Sculpture Festival	Currumbin	2002	September	Annual
UQ Big Gig	UQ Brisbane	1990s?	February O week	Annual
Urban Country Music Festival	Caboolture	2004	Qld May Long Weekend	Annual
VDMfest	Biloela	2017	October	Annual
Village Festival	Yeppoon	2003	August	Annual
The Vision Splendid Outback Film Festival	Winton	2014	Late June – Early July	Annual
Wallaby Creek Festival	Rossville	2002	23–25 September	
Wintersun Festival	Coolangatta/Tweed Heads	1978	June	
Woodford Folk Festival	Woodford	1987	27 December–1 January	Annual
Yeppoon Pinefest	Yeppoon	1967	October	Annual
Yungaburra Folk Festival	Yungaburra	1997	May	Annual

== South Australia ==
Festival	Location	Began / When	Notes
Adelaide 500	Adelaide	1999	Was Clipsal 500; annual motor racing event on Adelaide streets in March
Adelaide Biennial of Australian Art	Art Gallery of South Australia	1990	"The flagship visual arts event of the Adelaide Festival of Arts"
Adelaide Cabaret Festival	Adelaide	2001	Annual in June
Adelaide Fashion Festival	Adelaide	2008	Annual
Adelaide Festival of Arts	Adelaide	1960	Was biennial, annual since 2012; aka Adelaide Festival
Adelaide Festival of Ideas	Adelaide	1999	Biennial
Adelaide Film Festival	Adelaide	2003	Biennial
Adelaide Food Fringe	South Australia	2020	One of South Australia's largest food and beverage festivals.
Adelaide Fringe	Adelaide	1960	Was biennial now annual (as of 2007)
Adelaide Guitar Festival	Adelaide	2007	Was annual now biennial (as of 2009)
Adelaide Jazz Festival	Adelaide	2023	
Adelaide Language Festival	Adelaide	2014	
Adelaide Writers' Week	Pioneer Women's Memorial Garden (Adelaide)	1960	Part of the Adelaide Festival; annual in March
Big Day Out	Adelaide	1993–2014	Multi-city music festival
Burnout	Mutonia, Alberrie Creek, Oodnadatta Track	2004	was Mighty Burning Demon Festival
Cabaret Fringe Festival	Adelaide	2008	Annual open-access festival in June
Cheesefest; Cheesefest + Ferment	Adelaide	2007–2013; 2017–	Ran as Cheesefest until 2013; Ferment 2017; Cheesefest & Ferment 2018–
A Day On The Green	Barossa Valley, then McLaren Vale		Annual
DreamBIG Children's Festival	Adelaide	1974	Biennial; formerly Come Out
Feast Festival	Adelaide	1997	Lesbian and gay arts festival
Fleurieu Folk Festival	Willunga, South Australia	2007	Folk Festival held annually in October on the Fleurieu Peninsula
FOMO Festival	Elder Park, Adelaide	2017	Multi-city festival in January
Future Music Festival	Adelaide	2006–2015	
Gawler Gourmet & Heritage Festival	Gawler		
Illuminate Adelaide	Adelaide	2021	Includes Adelaide Festival of Ideas
Kernewek Lowender	Kadina, Moonta and Wallaroo	1973	Biennial, Cornish-themed festival held in Copper Coast towns
Leafy Sea Dragon Festival	Fleurieu Peninsula	2005–2013(?)	
Live at the Zoo	Monarto	2008	(one-off)
Lizard's Revenge	Roxby Downs	2012	Annual Music Arts and Culture Festival
Nature Festival	South Australia	2020	Annual nature-themed fesival with +350 events across SA in 2026 (Website)
Oysterfest	Ceduna	1991	Held annually on the October Labour Day long weekend.
OzAsia Festival	Adelaide	2007	Annual; includes JLF International (literary festival) since 2018
SALA Festival	Adelaide	1998	South Australian Living Artists Festival, Annual Celebration of the Visual Arts
Schützenfest	Adelaide		Shooting and Beer Festival
Sea and Vines Festival	McLaren Vale		
Soundwave	Adelaide	2007–2015	Multi-city music festival
South Australia's History Festival	South Australia	2004	SA's largest festival, 1–31 May; over 600 individual events in 2016.
Stereosonic	Adelaide	2009–2005	Annual; electronic dance music festival
Tarnanthi	Art Gallery of South Australia, Adelaide	2015	Annual in October; Contemporary Aboriginal and TSI Art
Umbrella: Winter City Sounds	Adelaide	2016	Annual in July; multi-genre music festival in multiple venues
Vegan Festival	Rundle Park, Adelaide	2007	Annual in October; celebrates and showcases vegan food and lifestyle
WOMADelaide	Botanic Park, Adelaide	1992	Annual (since 2003); 4 days in March; world music

== Tasmania ==
Festival	Location	Began / When	Notes
Agfest	Carrick	1982	Held in May
Australian Wooden Boat Festival	Hobart	1994	Held in February, biennial
The Derwent Valley Autumn Festival	The Esplanade, New Norfolk	2000	Held in April
The Derwent Valley Medieval Festival	Kensington Park New Norfolk	2016	Held in October
Henley-on-Mersey	Bells Parade, Latrobe	1910	Held on Australia Day (26 January) featuring food, fun, fitness and ferrets.
Australian Shakespeare Festival	Hobart		Held in January
Dark Mofo	Hobart	2013	Held in June
Devil Country Muster	Smithton	2013	Held in February
Kentish Arts Festival	Sheffield		Held in March–April
Festivale	Launceston	1988	Held in February
Falls Festival	Hobart		Held in January
Festival of Broadway	Hobart		Held in June
Festival of King Island (FOKI)	King Island (Tasmania)	2013	1st weekend of February. (Website)
Fractangular Gathering – Open Air Collaborative Arts Festival	Buckland		Was held in February, no longer happening
Huon Valley Mid Winter Festival	Grove		
Mural Fest	Sheffield		Held on Easter Sunday
The Cygnet Folk Festival	Cygnet	1979	Held in January (Website)
Tamar Valley Beer Festival	Tamar Valley	2010	Held in January
Tasmanian Beerfest	Princes Wharf	2006	Held in November
TastroFest – Tasmania's Astronomy Festival	Ulverstone, North West Tasmania	2015	Held in August
The Taste Of Tasmania Festival	Hobart	1988	Held on 28 December– 3 January Annually (Website)
Taste of the Huon	Ranelagh	1995	Held in March
Terror Australis Readers and Writers Festival	Hobart	2019	Held in October/November (Website)
The Unconformity	Queenstown	2010	Held biennially in October (Website)
MONA FOMA	Hobart and Launceston	2008	Held in January until 2022, Held in February 2023 (Website)
Chocolate Winterfest, Latrobe	Latrobe	2004	Held in August - chocolate themed festival.
10 Days on the Island	Statewide	2001	Held in March (Website)

== Victoria ==
Festival	Location	Began	Date	Notes
Altona Bayside	Altona	1997		Community Festival with Street Parade and Fireworks, held annually over a weekend in March.
Apollo Bay Music Festival	Apollo Bay			
Art is... festival	Horsham	1995		Annual Arts Festival
ART+CLIMATE=CHANGE	Melbourne	2015		Biennial arts festival focusing on climate change and the environment.
Australian Contemporary Opera Co.	Melbourne, Yarra Valley	2017		Annual Opera Festival
Ballarat Beer Festival	Ballarat	1995		Annual Beer Festival In January
BeerFest	Melbourne	1952		Annual Beer Festival in February
Beers by the Bay	Mornington	1952		Annual Beer Festival on 17 November 2012
Begonia Festival	Ballarat	1952	March	Community cultural festival with begonia theme – Labour Day long weekend
Bendigo Blues & Roots Music Festival	Bendigo	2011		Annual Blues & Roots Music Festival usually held on the first week of November each year.
Bendigo Easter Festival	Bendigo	1871		Held annually over the Easter long weekend. Australia's oldest ongoing community festival.
Bendigo Writers Festival	Bendigo	2012		Writers festival held in August
Beyond The Valley Festival	Lardner, Victoria	2014		A multi-day music festival held annually at Gippsland Parklands in Lardner, Victoria, Australia over the New Year's Eve period.
Big West Festival	Footscray	1997		Biennial Contemporary Arts and Cultural Festival
Broadford Country Music Festival	Broadford			Country music festival
Bruthen Blues and Arts Festival	Bruthen	1994	third weekend in February annually	
Brewers Feast Craft Beer and Food Festival	Melbourne	2016 to present	first weekend in December annually	
Buddha's Day and Multicultural Festival	Federation Square, Melbourne	1995		Annual Buddhist Festival celebrating the Buddha's Birthday
Castlemaine State Festival of the Arts	Castlemaine	1976		Multi-arts, 10-day, Biennial Festival in odd years, March/April.
Dancing Ground Festival	Gembrook	2011		Weekend dance and movement workshop festival. Camping based, includes meals. Annually in February.
Environmental Film Festival Melbourne	Melbourne	2010		Environmental films from Australia and around the world
Earthcore	Pyalong	1993		Earthcore hosted the first Bush Doof to be held in Australia and continues to every year during November.
Falls Festival	Lorne	1993		Music festival – 29 December to 1 January
Fest la Frog	French Island	7–13 April		
Festival of Sails	Geelong	1844		
Foggy Mountain Bluegrass Festival	Kinglake	2014	October	Annual festival – Bluegrass music performances and workshops (Website)
Folk Rhythm & Life	Eldorado	1996		
Freeplay Independent Games Festival	Melbourne	2004	May	Australia's longest-running and largest independent games festival.
Gala Day	Geelong	1916		Festival held annually in November. (Website)
Geelong Highland Gathering	Geelong	1857	March	Annual Festival held in Geelong. The original Highland Gathering was held on New Years Day and was organised and promoted by the local "Commun Na Feinne" Society formed in 1856. Clans known to attend include attend Boyd, Buchanan, Donald, Donnachaidh (Robertson), Edmonstone, Fraser, Grant, MacLeod, MacDonald, MacKenzie, McLaughlin, MacLean, MacPherson, Thomas, Sinclair, Scottish Gaelic, VSU. Geelong Highland Gathering Association Website
Globe to Globe World Music Festival	Clayton South	2001		Festival held annually around Australia Day. (Website)
Good Beer Week	Melbourne	2011		runs from 18 to 26 May
Grampians Grape Escape	Halls Gap	1991		Food, wine, music festival in the Grampians National Park. Held annually, first weekend of May.
The Grass Is Greener	Cairns			
Great Australian Beer Festival	Geelong	2013		a Beer Festival Held annually, early February.
Guildford Banjo Jamboree	Guildford	2004	September	Annual music festival – performances, workshops (Website)
Healesville Music Festival	Healesville	2010	November	Annual music festival with performances, workshops in a variety of venues (Website)
Irish Film Festival Australia	Melbourne (and across Australia)	2015	October-November	Annual national arts festival featuring Irish films. (Website)
Let Them Eat Cake NYD	Werribee Mansion	2011	New Year's Day	A NYD gathering for electronic music lovers featuring artisanal food, manicured gardens and art installations (Website)
Maldon Easter Fair	Maldon	1878		Held annually over the Easter long weekend. Australia's oldest continuous Easter Fair.
Maldon Folk Festival	Maldon	1974		Held annually over the weekend before the Melbourne Cup.
Melbourne Art Fair	Melbourne	1988		A biennial contemporary art fair. The first international art fair hosted in Australia.
Melbourne Flower and Garden Show	Melbourne			
Melbourne Fringe Festival	Melbourne	1983		
Melbourne Food and Wine Festival	Melbourne	1993		
Melbourne International Games Week	Melbourne	2015		A week of events celebrating gaming culture in arts and education.
Melbourne International Singers Festival	Melbourne	2010		Festival for choirs, singing groups and individual singers. Held over the Queen's Birthday Weekend in June. (website)
Melbourne Jazz Festival	Melbourne	1998		Music festival – May
Melbourne Jazz Fringe Festival	Melbourne	2005		Music festival – May
Melbourne International Arts Festival	Melbourne	1986		
Melbourne International Comedy Festival	Melbourne	1987		
Melbourne International Film Festival (MIFF)	Melbourne	1951		Film festival – October
Melbourne Queer Film Festival	Melbourne	1991		Film festival – March
Melbourne School Bands Festival	Melbourne	1989		Music festival
Melbourne Ukulele Festival (MUF)	Northcote	2010		Music festival – March
Melbourne Underground Film Festival (MUFF)	Melbourne	1996		Film festival – August
Melbourne Writers Festival	Melbourne	1986	August	(Website)
Meredith Music Festival	Meredith	1991		Music festival
Midsumma Festival	Melbourne	1989		Summer lesbian and gay festival
Mildura Jazz Food and Wine Festival	Mildura	1979		Traditional and contemporary jazz, food and wine
Mildura Palimpsest Biennale	Mildura			Contemporary site-specific visual arts festival
Mildura Wentworth Arts Festival	Mildura	1996		A large regional arts festival
Mildura Writers Festival	Mildura	1994		Program of workshops, lectures and discussion forums
Moyneyana Festival	Port Fairy			Summer festival
Moomba	Melbourne	1955		
Murray River International Music Festival	Mildura	2003		Beautiful music in beautiful locations
Nati Frinj	Natimuk	2000		Arts festival
National Celtic Festival	Portarlington			Celtic festival
Next Wave Festival	Melbourne	1985		Arts festival
Pako Festa	Geelong West	1983		Cultural festival
Pitch Music & Arts Festival	Moyston	2017	March	Electronic music and arts festival (Website)
Poppykettle Festival	Geelong	1981		Arts festival
Port Fairy Folk Festival	Port Fairy	1977		Folk, blues, roots, Celtic, world music festival. Labour Day weekend annually.
Port Fairy Spring Music Festival	Port Fairy	1990		Open-air free annual festival, classical as well as other genres of music
Pyramid Rock Festival	Pyramid Rock, Phillip Island	2004		Music festival 30 December – 1 January (held annually)
Queenscliff Music Festival	Queenscliff	1997		Music festival
Rainbow Serpent Festival	Beaufort	1997		Electronic music festival
Rheola Charity Carnival	Rheola	1871		
St Jerome's Laneway Festival	Melbourne	2004		Music festival
St Kilda Festival	St Kilda	1981		Music festival – 2nd Sunday in February
Sex Camp	Victoria	2012		A weekend of workshops, discussion, food, film and performance
Sustainable Living Festival	Melbourne	1998		Sustainable living festival
Stringybark Festival	Melbourne	1985		Sustainability / environmental festival – 3rd weekend in October
Sydney Road Street Party	Brunswick	1989		Cultural festival
Tarra Festival	Yarram	1972		Easter festival
Tesselaar Tulip Festival	Silvan	1954		Tulip festival
Thai Culture and Food Festival	Melbourne	2004		Multicultural festival
The Big Freeze Winter Family Festival	Cranbourne	2016		Encouraging families to stay active, creative and use their imaginations over winter
The Village Continuum Festival	Bolinda	2014	Melbourne Cup Weekend (Saturday to Monday)	3 day, fully catered, camping festival. Traditional crafts, nature skills & well-being tools. (Website)
Toast to the Coast	Geelong	2004	3–4 November 2012	
Wandong Country Music Festival	Wandong	1972		Country music festival
Weerama	Werribee	1978		
Williamstown Literary Festival	Williamstown	2002		Literary festival April/May annually
Winchelsea Festival	Winchelsea, Victoria	2000		Country festival, November annually
Wine and Cheese Fest	Williamstown, Victoria	2014		Wine and cheese festival, annually in October
Woodend Winter Arts Festival	Woodend	2004		Classical music and literature festival (Queen's Birthday Weekend)
YIRRAMBOI Festival	Melbourne	2017		Indigenous Australian culture, biennially in May

== Western Australia ==
Festival	Location	Began / When	Notes
Augusta River Festival	Augusta		Music festival held in March
Avon Valley Writers Festival	Toodyay		Writers festival held in September
Big Sky Readers and Writers Festival	Geraldton		Writers festival held in September
Boyup Brook Country Music Festival	Boyup Brook		Country music, ute and truck muster, markets, bush poetry, art exhibitions, workshops, held in February
Blues at Bridgetown Festival	Bridgetown	1993	WA's longest running Blues & Roots Music Festival, held on the 2nd weekend of November each year.
Brave New Works Festival	Denmark	1994	Held in March.
Broome Arts & Music Festival	Broome		Music, arts and cultural festival held in March
Channel 7 Mandurah Crab Fest presented by LiveLighter	Mandurah	1999	Food and music festival held in March
Corrugated Lines: A festival of words	Broome		Writers festival held in August
Darlington Arts Festival	Darlington		Community festival held in November
Denmark Festival of Voice	Denmark	2003	Music festival held on the June long weekend.
Elmar's Food & Beer Festival	Perth		beer festival
Fairbridge Festival	Pinjarra	1992	Folk, blues, roots, Celtic, acoustic, world music festival held in April
FeBREWary	Perth		beer festival in 1–28 February 2013
Festival of Country Gardens	Balingup		Flora festival held in May
Festival of The Wind	Esperance		Food and music festival held in March
FotoFreo Festival	Fremantle		International photography festival held biennially in April
Fremantle Children's Fiesta	Fremantle		An annual event celebrating children, and reflecting the diversity of the Fremantle community, held in Samson Park
Fremantle Festival	Fremantle	1905	Art and music festival held in November
Fremantle Heritage Festival	Fremantle		Art, music, cultural festival held in May
Fremantle Street Arts Festival	Fremantle	1997	Arts festival held in April
Fremantle Tomato Festival	Fremantle	2004	One-day tomato festival held in either February or March as part of the Fremantle Village Art Market
Great Southern Taste Festival	Albany		Food, wine, art and music festival held in February/March
GWN Great Southern Multi-Cultural Festival	Albany		Food and wine festival with street stalls held in March
Irish Film Festival Australia	Perth (and across Australia)	2015	Annual national arts festival featuring Irish films. (Website)
Jurien Bay Easter Festival	Jurien Bay		
Kimberley Writers Festival	Kununurra	2005	Writers festival held in July
Kings Park and Botanic Gardens Wildflower Festival	Kings Park		Flora festival held in September
Leederville Street Festival	Leederville		Food and wine festival with street stalls held in November
Mango Festival	Broome		Food festival held in November
Margaret River Readers & Writers Festival	Margaret River		Writers festival held in May
Margaret River Wine Region Festival	Margaret River		Wine festival held in November
Moondyne Festival	Toodyay	1984	Cultural festival celebrating the history of Toodyay, with markets and entertainment, first Sunday in May
Mount Barker Wine Festival Weekend	Mount Barker		Wine festival held in January
Mundaring Truffle Festival	Mundaring	2007	Food festival with a focus on edible truffles and other local produce, held in July
Nambung Country Music Muster	Nambung		Country Music festival including Bush Poets held last weekend in October
Nannup Music Festival	Nannup		Music festival held in March
Narrogin Spring Festival	Narrogin		Open gardens, markets, music, food, street parade and other entertainment, held in October
Ningaloo Whaleshark Festival	Exmouth		Environmental, arts and ocean sport festival held in May
Northam Motorcycle Festival	Northam		Motorcycle festival held in October
Northam International Festival	Northam		Music, arts and cultural festival held in November
Over The Fence Comedy Film Festival	Perth	1996	Travelling independent Australian comedy film festival held from May until March the following year
Pemberton Autumn Festival	Pemberton		Food & wine festival held on the first Saturday in May every year
Perth Beer Festival	Perth		beer festival
Perth Fashion Festival	Perth		Fashion festival held in September
Perth Fringe Festival	Perth	January–February 2011	Arts and cultural festival held in January/February
Perth Garden & Outdoor Living Festival	Perth		Gardening festival
Perth International Arts Festival	Perth	1953	Art, music, film, and theatre festival held in January and February
Perth International Comedy Festival	Perth	2012	Curated comedy festival held in Mt Lawley over 19 days in May.
Perth Medieval Fayre	Supreme Court Gardens, Perth		Fayre held in the style of a renaissance fair. 3rd Saturday in March
Red Earth Arts Festival	Karratha	2010	Arts festival held in September
Revelation – Perth International Film Festival	Perth	1997	Film festival held in July
Rock It Festival	Joondalup		Biennial Music festival held at the Arena Joondalup in March and December
Rockingham Community Fair	Rockingham		Family festival held in November
Rollercoaster	Mandurah	2004	Annual music festival held on the Mandurah foreshore in December
Shinju Matsuri – Festival of the Pearl	Broome	1972	Music, arts and cultural festival held in September
South West Craft Beer Festival	Busselton		beer festival in February
SPLIF Festival	Perth	2001	Independent short film festival for West Australian film makers held in January
Spring In The Valley Festival	Swan Valley		Wine and music festival held in October
Sprung in the Alley Craft Beer Festival	Perth		beer festival
Staircase To The Moon Festival	Broome		Heritage, and environmental festival held in March
Stuffit	Wanneroo		Taxidermy festival held in March
The Sunshine Festival	Geraldton	1959	Community Festival held in October
UWA Annual Spring Feast	Perth	1999	Night market international food festival held in October
Vintage Blues Festival	Albany		Wine and music festival held in January at Wignalls Wines
WA Beer Week	Perth		beer festival
WA Food and Wine Festival	Perth		Food and wine festival held in June
West Coast Blues & Roots Festival	Fremantle		Sunset Events music festival held in February
Whale Song Augusta Festival	Augusta	2010	Music and entertainment, whale-watching, to celebrate the arrival of the southern right and humpback whales in the waters of Augusta during their annual migrations, first week of June
Wild West Comedy Festival	Perth	2007	Comedy Festival
Words in the Valley Writers & Readers Festival	Bridgetown		Writers festival held in July
York Jazz Festival	York		Jazz music festival held in September/October
Yum In My Tum – a food festival just for kids!	Whiteman Park, Perth		WA's only food festival dedicated to children, takes place annually on the last weekend in November

== See also ==
- List of festivals
- List of festivals in Brisbane
- List of Australian music festivals
