= List of music festivals in Australia =

This is a list of music festivals in Australia, including festivals that have stopped running.

== A–E ==
- Adelaide Guitar Festival
- Adelaide Jazz Festival
- Alternative Nation Festival
- Arockalypse Now
- Australian Festival of Chamber Music
- Australian Gospel Music Festival
- Bassinthedust
- Bassinthegrass
- Bendigo Blues and Roots Music Festival
- Beyond The Valley
- Big Day Out (in capital cities 1992–2014)
- Big Red Bash
- Blacken Open Air
- Byron Bay Bluesfest
- Break the Ice
- Brutefest
- Camp Doogs
- Canberra Country Music Festival
- Castlemaine State Festival
- CoastFest
- Come Together Music Festival
- Creamfields Australia
- Darwin International Guitar Festival
- Defqon.1 Festival
- Dingo Creek Jazz & Blues Festival
- Distorted Music Festival
- Drencherfest
- Earthcore
- Easterfest
- EPIK

== F-L ==
- Fairbridge Festival
- Falls Festival
- Festival of the Sun
- Flippin' the Bird
- Froth and Fury
- Global Gathering
- Golden Plains
- Gone South
- Good Things
- The Grass is Greener
- Groovin The Moo
- Gympie Muster
- The Great Escape
- Homebake
- Invasion Fest
- Laneway Festival
- Listen Out
- Live at the Zoo
- Livid

== M–O ==
- Melbourne Dethfest
- Melbourne International Jazz Festival
- Meredith Music Festival
  - List of Meredith Music Festival lineups by year
- Metal for the Brain
- Metal on the Murray
- Metal to the Max
- Metal United Down Under
- Mildura Country Music Festival
- Moomba Festival
- Mountain Sounds (festival)
- MS Fest
- Mundi Mundi Bash
- Nannup Music Festival
- Narara Music Festival
- No Sleep Til Festival
- Offshore Festival
- One Night Stand

== P–T ==
- Parklife Festival
- Party in the Paddock PITP
- Peats Ridge Festival
- Planetshakers
- Port Fairy Folk Festival
- Primary Schools Music Festival
- Pyramid Rock Festival
- Queensland Music Festival
- Rainbow Serpent Festival
- Raggamuffin Music Festival
- Rewind 80s Festival Australia
- Rock-It Festival
- Rollercoaster
- Shredfest
- Soulfest
- SoundFest
- Soundwave Festival
- Southbound
- Southern Roots Festival
- Spilt Milk (festival)
- Splendour in the Grass
- Spliffs n Riffs
- St Jerome's Laneway Festival
- Stereosonic
- Stompen Ground
- Stonefest
- Subsonic Music Festival
- Summadayze
- Summersault
- Sunbury music festival
- Sydney Eisteddfod
- Sydney Intervarsity Choral Festival (SIV)
- Taste of Chaos
- Tamworth Country Music Festival
- The Grass Is Greener
- Torch Fest

== U ==
- Umbrella: Winter City Sounds (Adelaide)
- Unify
- Ultra Music Festival

== V–Z ==
- V Festival (Australia)
- Village Fair
- Vivid LIVE
- Wandong Country Music Festival
- Wangaratta Festival of Jazz
- West Coast Blues & Roots Festival
- Woodford Folk Festival
- WOMADelaide
- Yarrapay Festival
- Yours and Owls

== See also ==
- List of festivals in Australia
