= Tim Webber =

Welsh visual effects supervisor

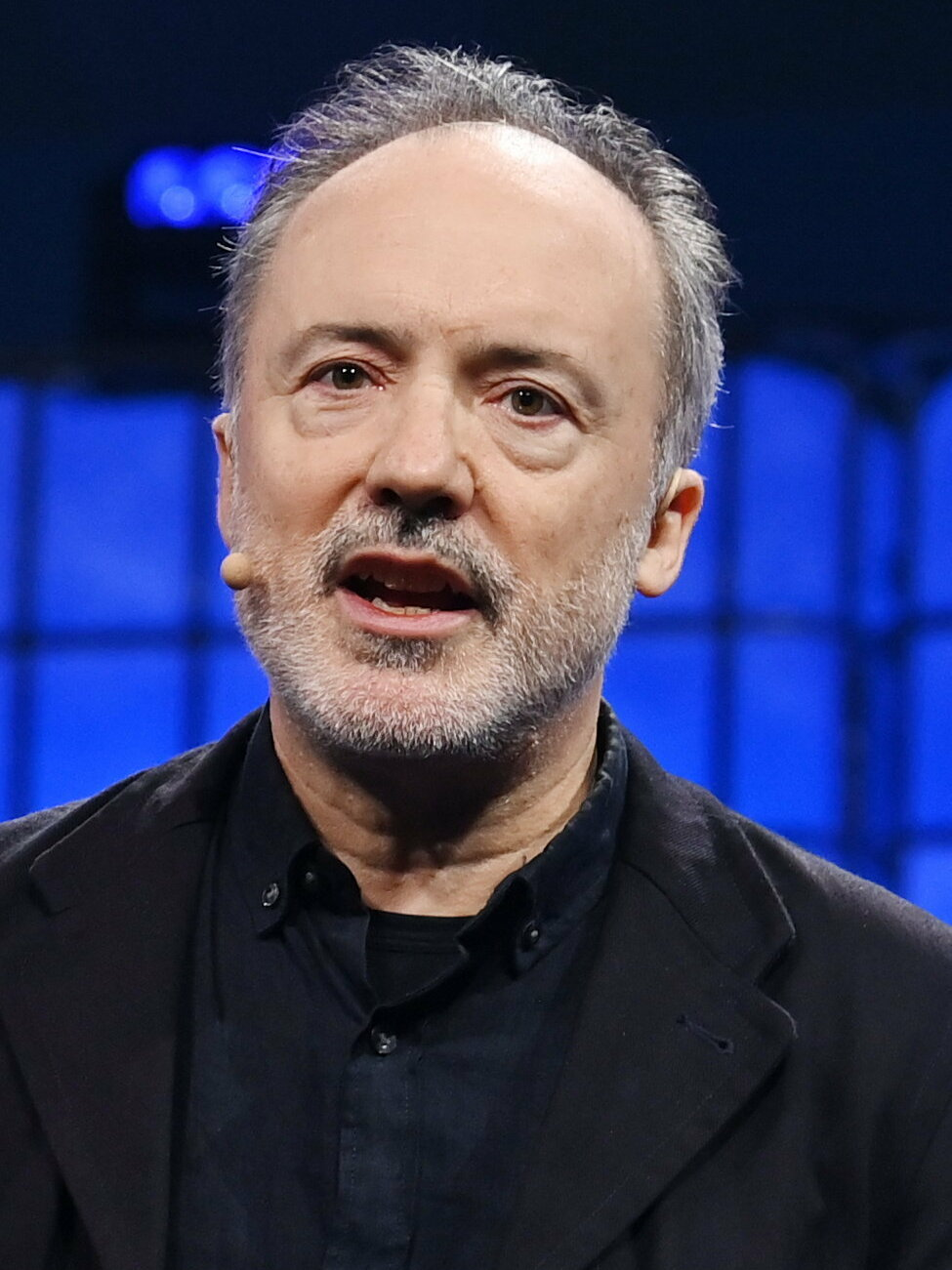
- Webber celebrating VFX Oscar win for Gravity
- Born: Wales
- Education: St Catherine's College, Oxford
- Occupation: Visual Effects Supervisor
- Awards: Academy Award for Best Visual Effects (2014)

Tim Webber is a Welsh visual effects supervisor and is chief creative officer at visual effects studio Framestore. He is known for his work on Harry Potter and the Goblet of Fire (2005), The Dark Knight (2008), Children of Men (2006), and Gravity (2013), for which he received an Academy Award for Best Visual Effects at the 86th Academy Awards.

== Education ==
Webber was educated at St Catherine's College, Oxford, graduating in physics in 1987.

== Career ==
In 1988, Webber joined the British visual effects company Framestore, based near Oxford Street in London. He led the company's push into Digital Film and Television, developing Framestore's virtual camera and motion rig systems. He has been the visual effects supervisor in some of the most technically and artistically challenging projects, including, Christopher Nolan's The Dark Knight (2008), James Cameron's Avatar (2009), and Louis Leterrier's Clash of the Titans (2010). He was Warner Brothers’ VFX supervisor on Alfonso Cuarón's space epic, Gravity (2013), with the techniques involved in the film realized by Webber and the Framestore team, taking three years to complete. David Heyman, co-producer of Gravity, hired Webber to oversee the film's visual effects work.

For his work on Gravity, he won both the BAFTA Award for Best Special Visual Effects at the 67th British Academy Film Awards, and an Academy Award for Best Visual Effects at the 86th Academy Awards.

In 2014, Webber was awarded the Royal Photographic Society Progress medal and Honorary Fellowship, which is awarded in recognition of any invention, research, publication or other contribution which has resulted in an important advance in the scientific or technological development of photography or imaging in the widest sense.

In 2023, Webber released his directorial and writing debut, in the form of sci-fi short film FLITE. Starring Alba Baptista, FLITE is set in a semi-submerged London of 2053 and brought some of the techniques first explored on the film Gravity into the present day. Using state of the art virtual production techniques, FLITE also tested FUSE - Framestore Unreal Shot Engine - which puts Epic Games Unreal Engine, and all the benefits of real-time, at the heart of a VFX pipeline. FLITE has won several awards including Best Genre at HollyShorts Film Festival 2023, Best Animation at The Soho London Independent Film Festival 2024 and Best Post Production and Best Score at Ignite Film Festival 2023. FLITE is available to watch on YouTube.

== Selected filmography ==
- Harry Potter and the Goblet of Fire (2005)
- The Dark Knight (2008)
- Avatar (2009)
- Children of Men (2006)
- Gravity (2013)
