= Bangtail muster =

Annual event in Alice Springs, Australia

The Bangtail muster is an annual event, in the form of a parade, hosted in Alice Springs (Mparntwe) each May to coincide with the May Day public holiday as this traditionally marks the beginning of the mustering season in Central Australia. The event is run by the Rotary Club of Alice Springs and it runs from the Todd Mall to ANZAC Oval.

It was first held in 1959 and it is designed to celebrate the history of the town. The event is named in honour of the "bangtail" in which, after cattle were mustered the hairy end of the tail would be cut; these tails were then counted so they could work out how many cattle had been mustered.

== Gallery ==
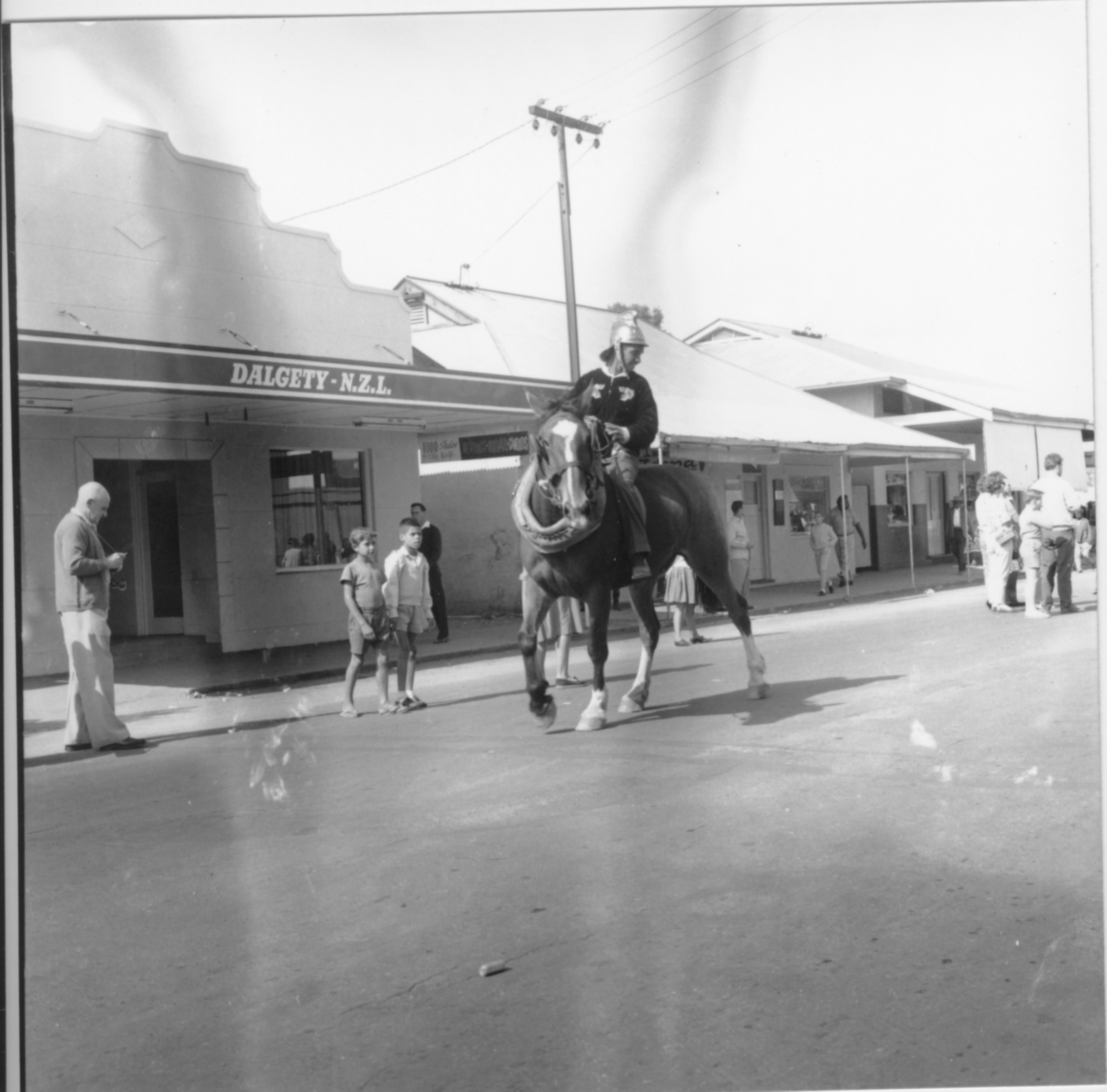
The first Bangtail Muster in 1959

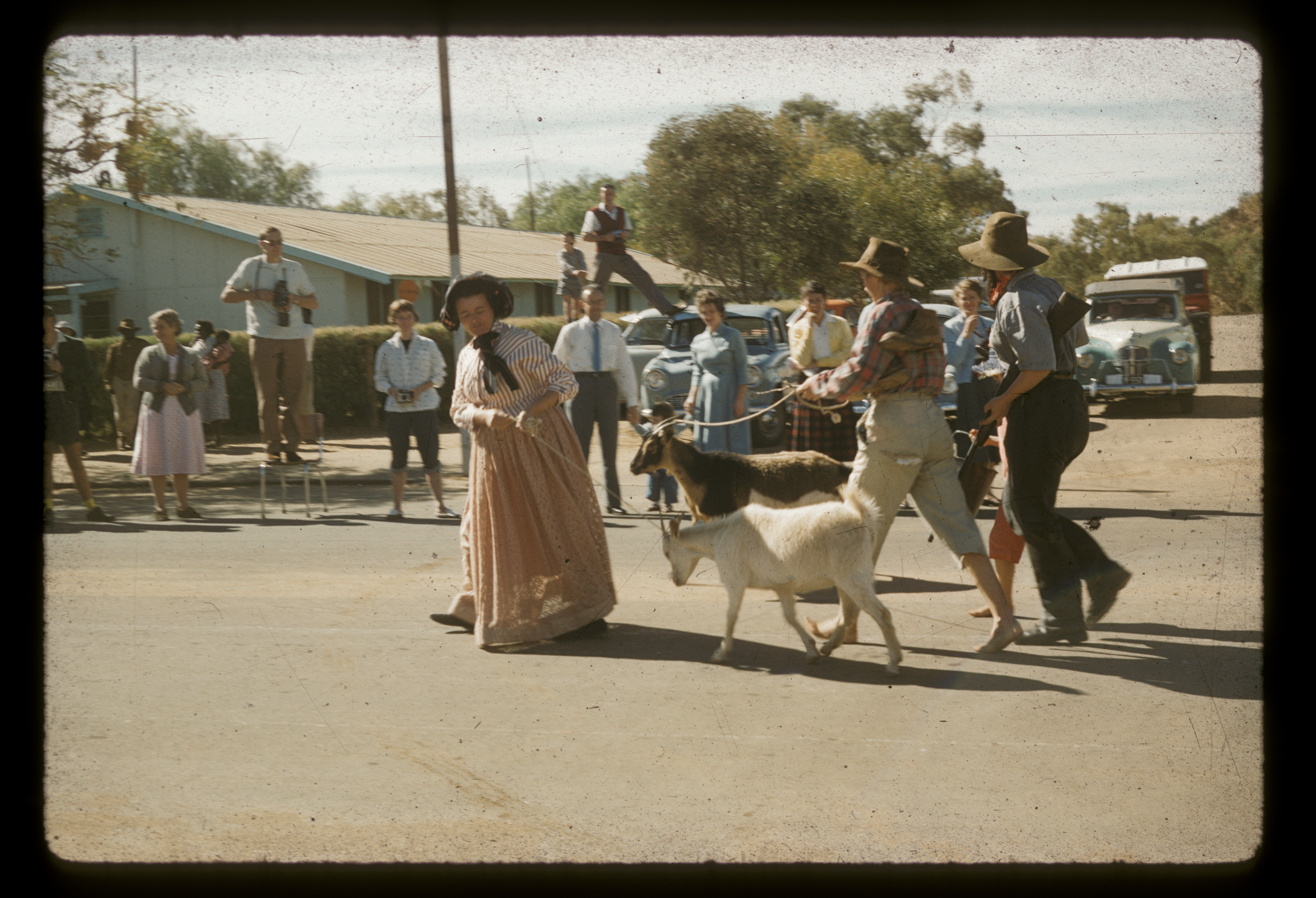
The first Bangtail Muster in 1959

Crowds watching the Bangtail Muster on Todd Street, 1960

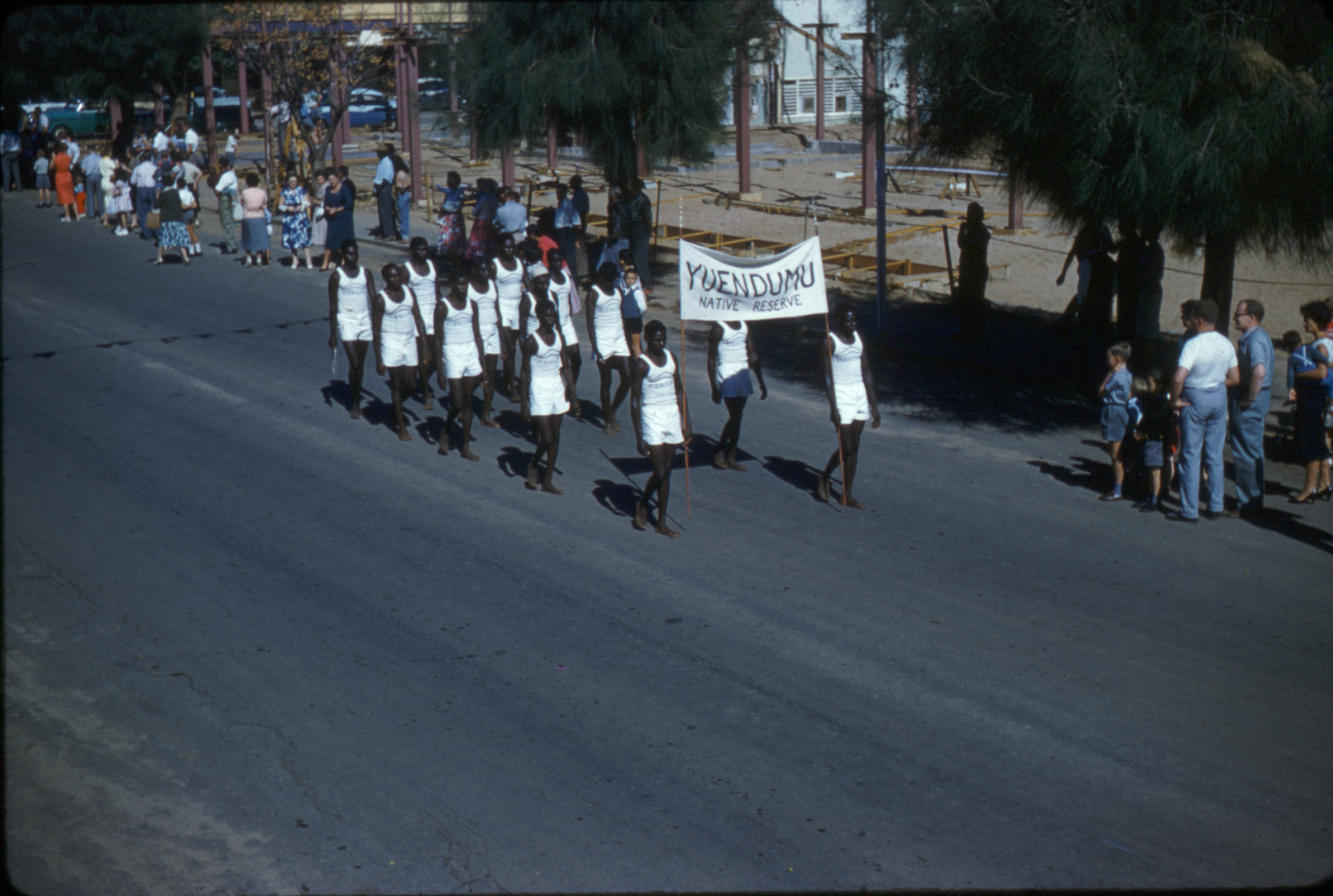
A group from Yuendumu marching, 1961

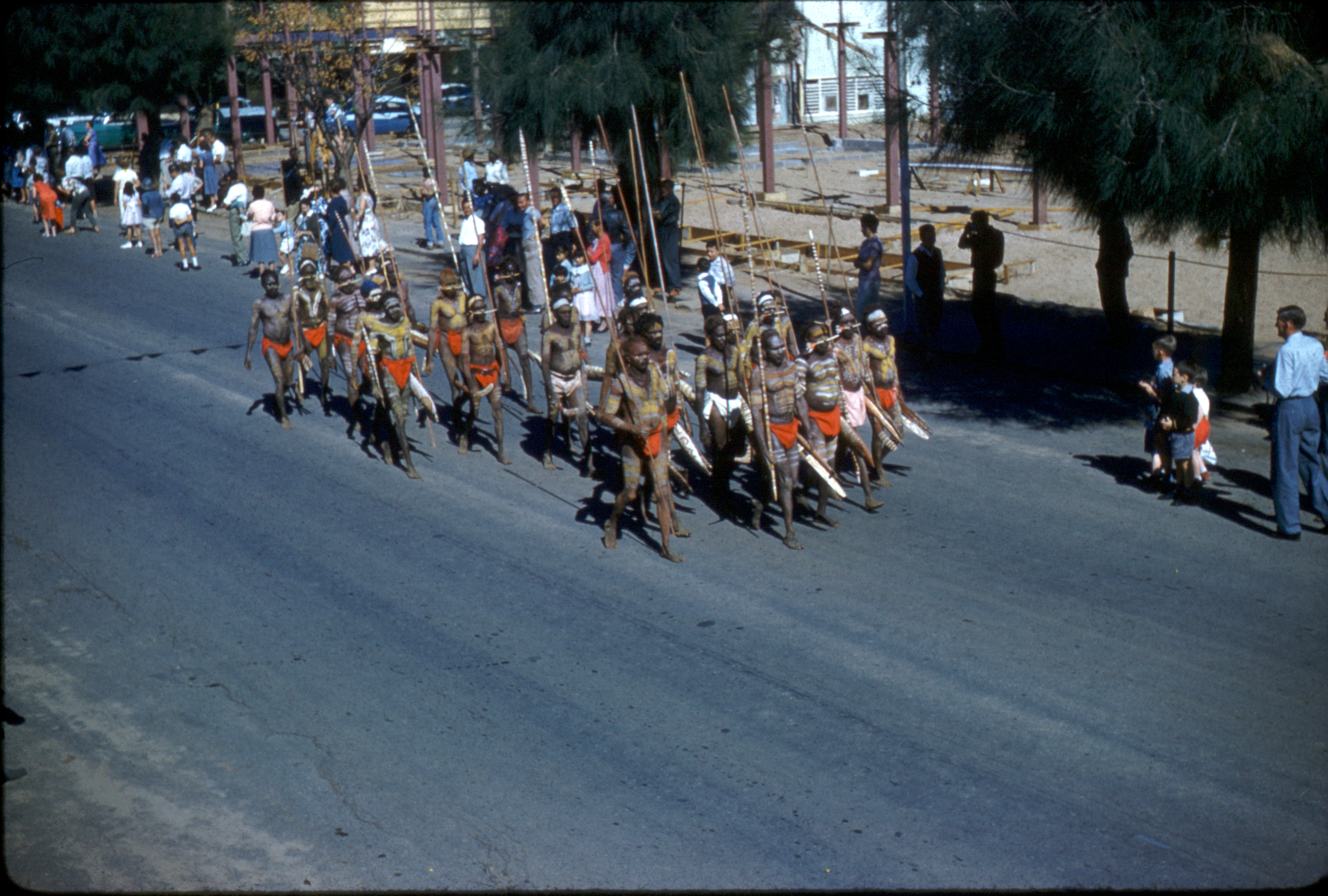
A second group from Yuendumu marching, 1961

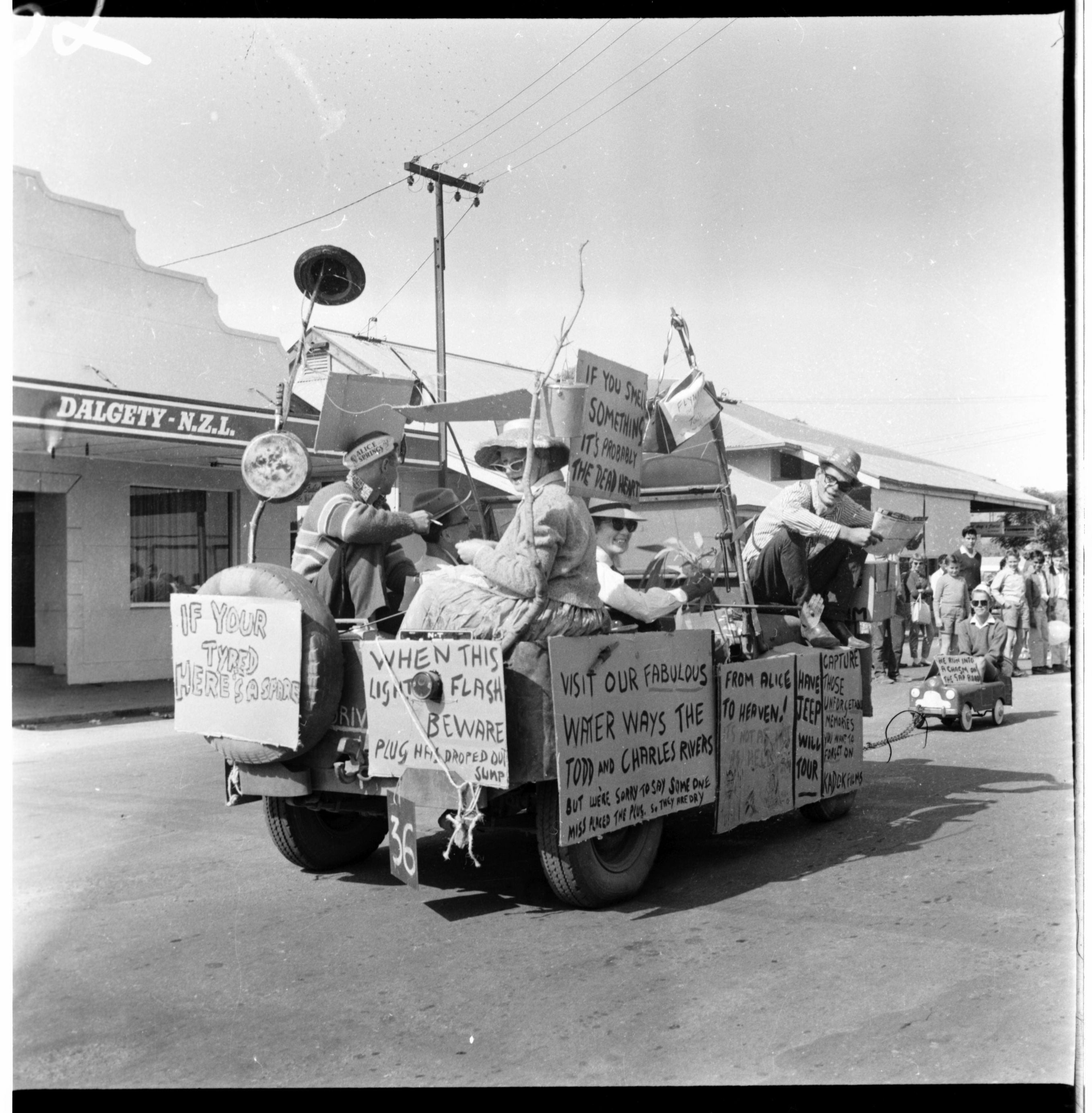
Float with multiple signs at the Bangtail Muster, 1963

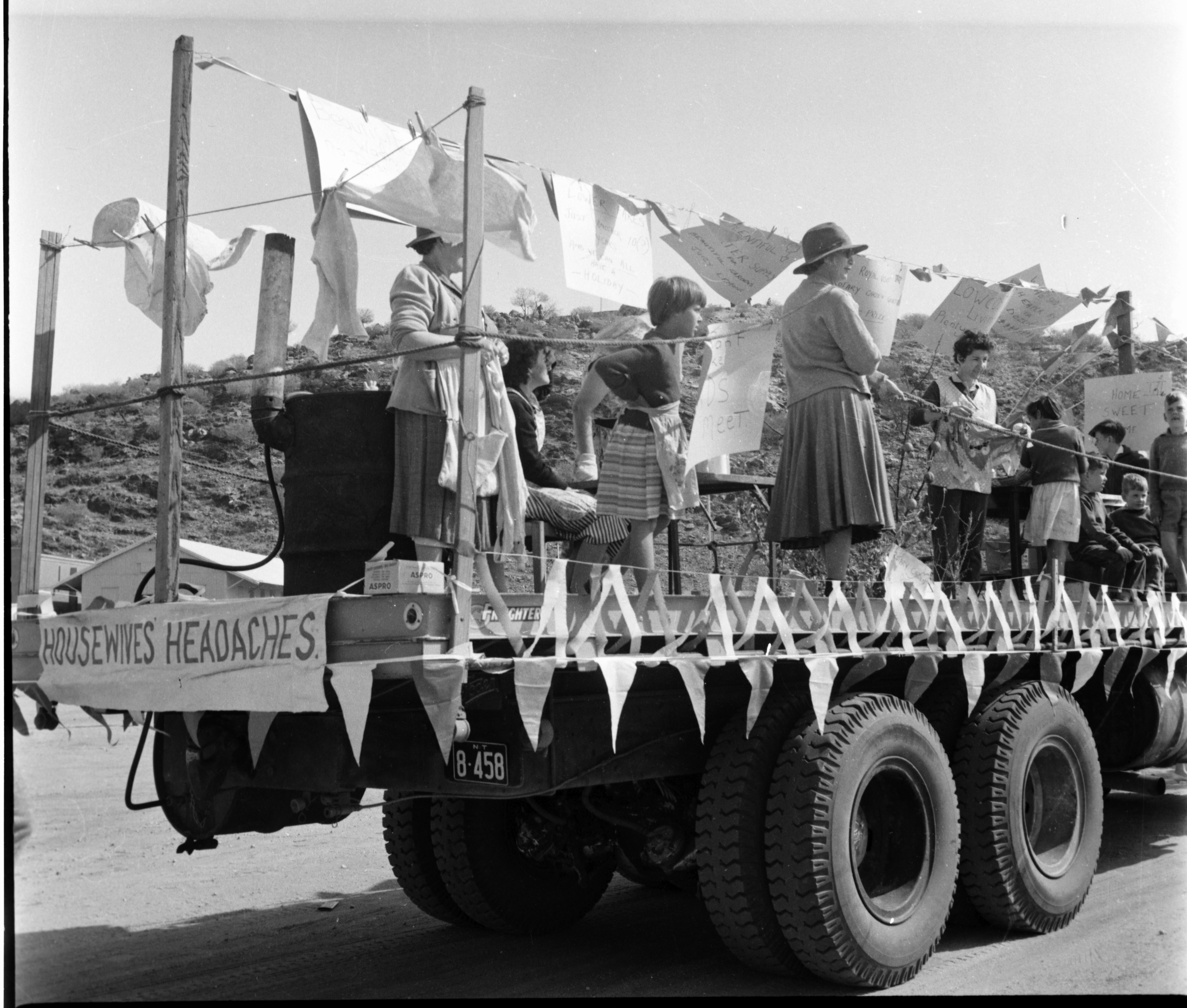
'Housewives headaches' at the Bangtail Muster, 1963

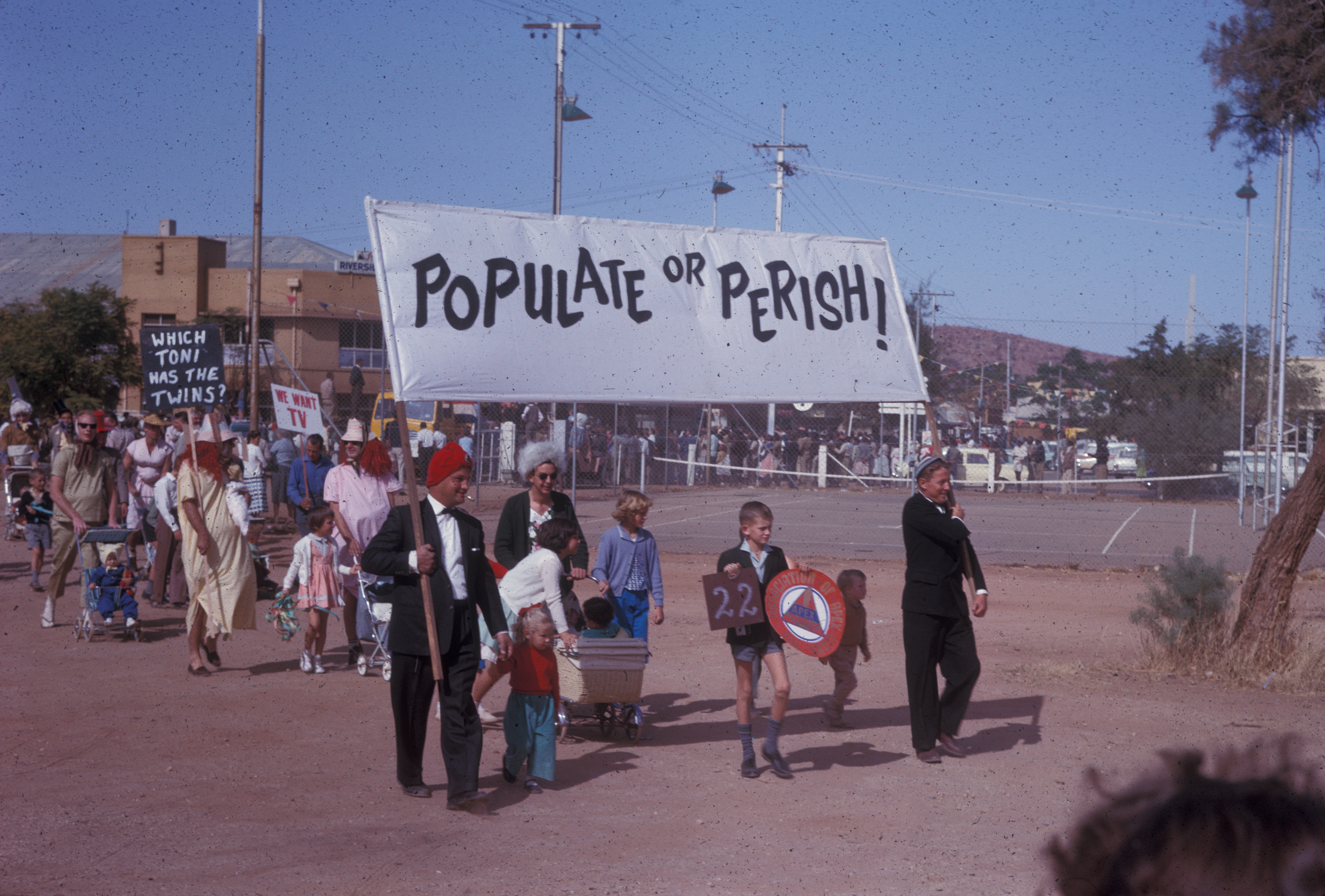
'Populate or perish' at the Bangtail Muster, 1963

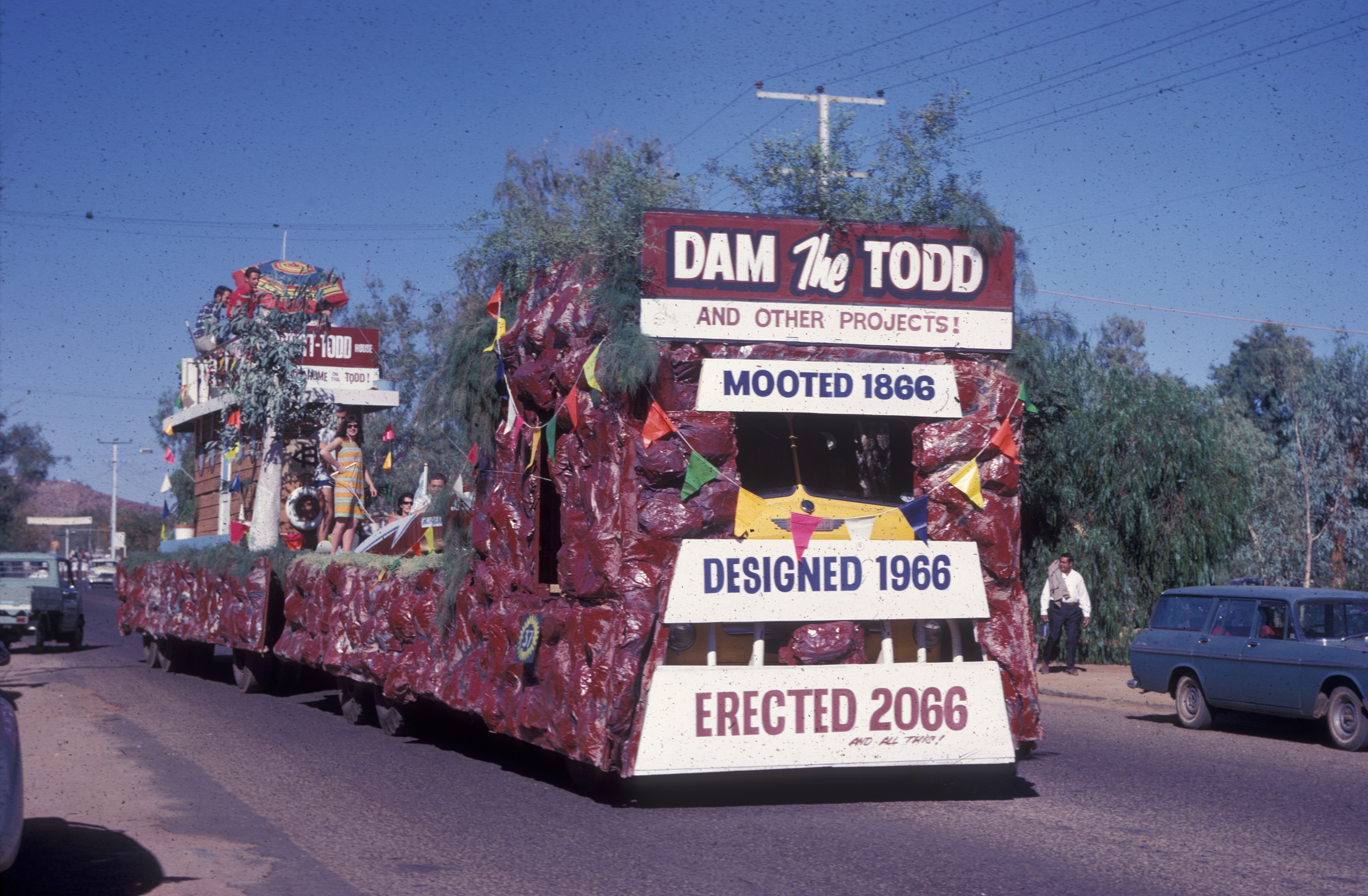
'Dam the Todd' [Todd River] at the Bangtail Muster 1963

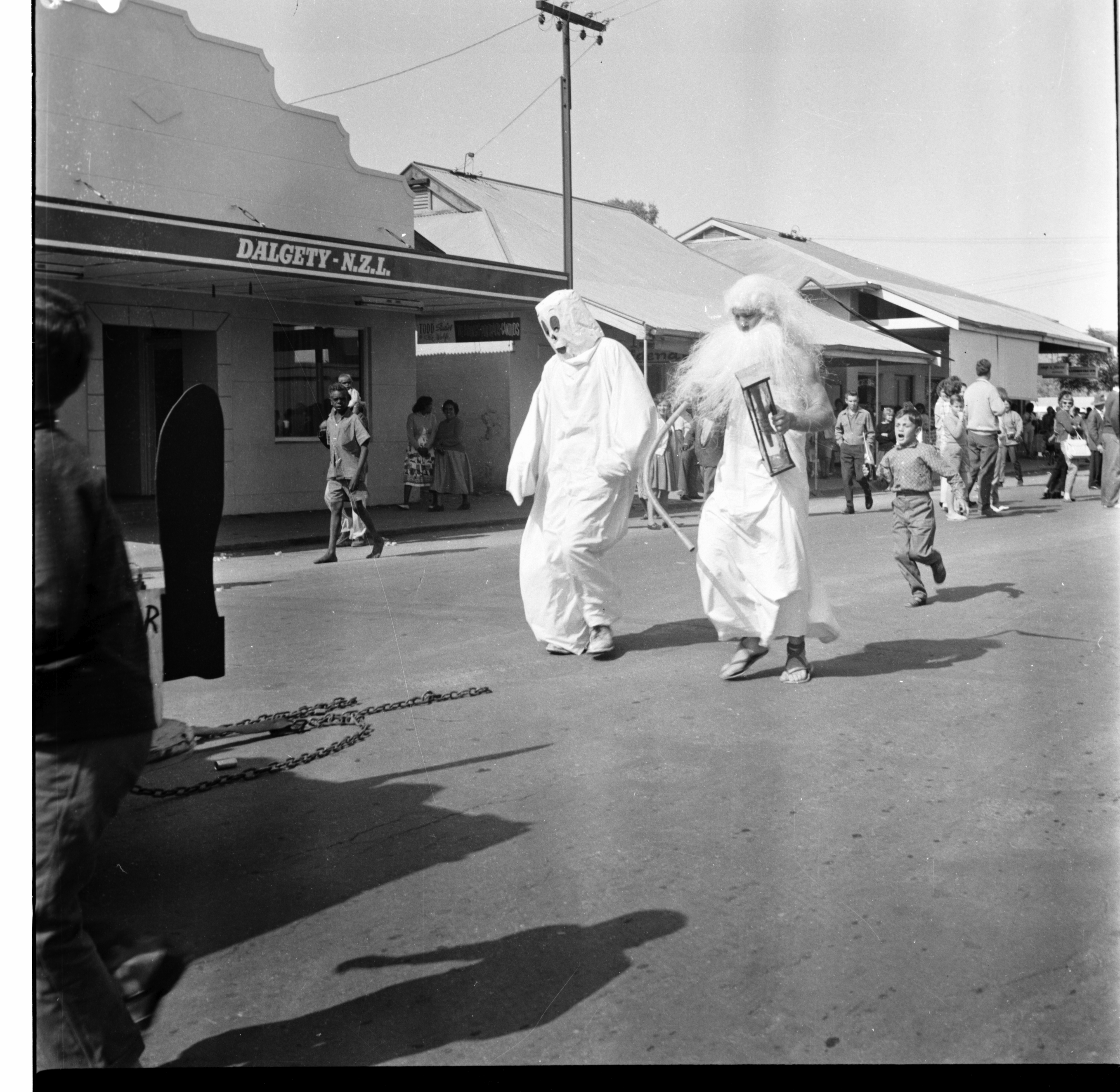
Dressed up entries in the Bangtail Muster, 1963

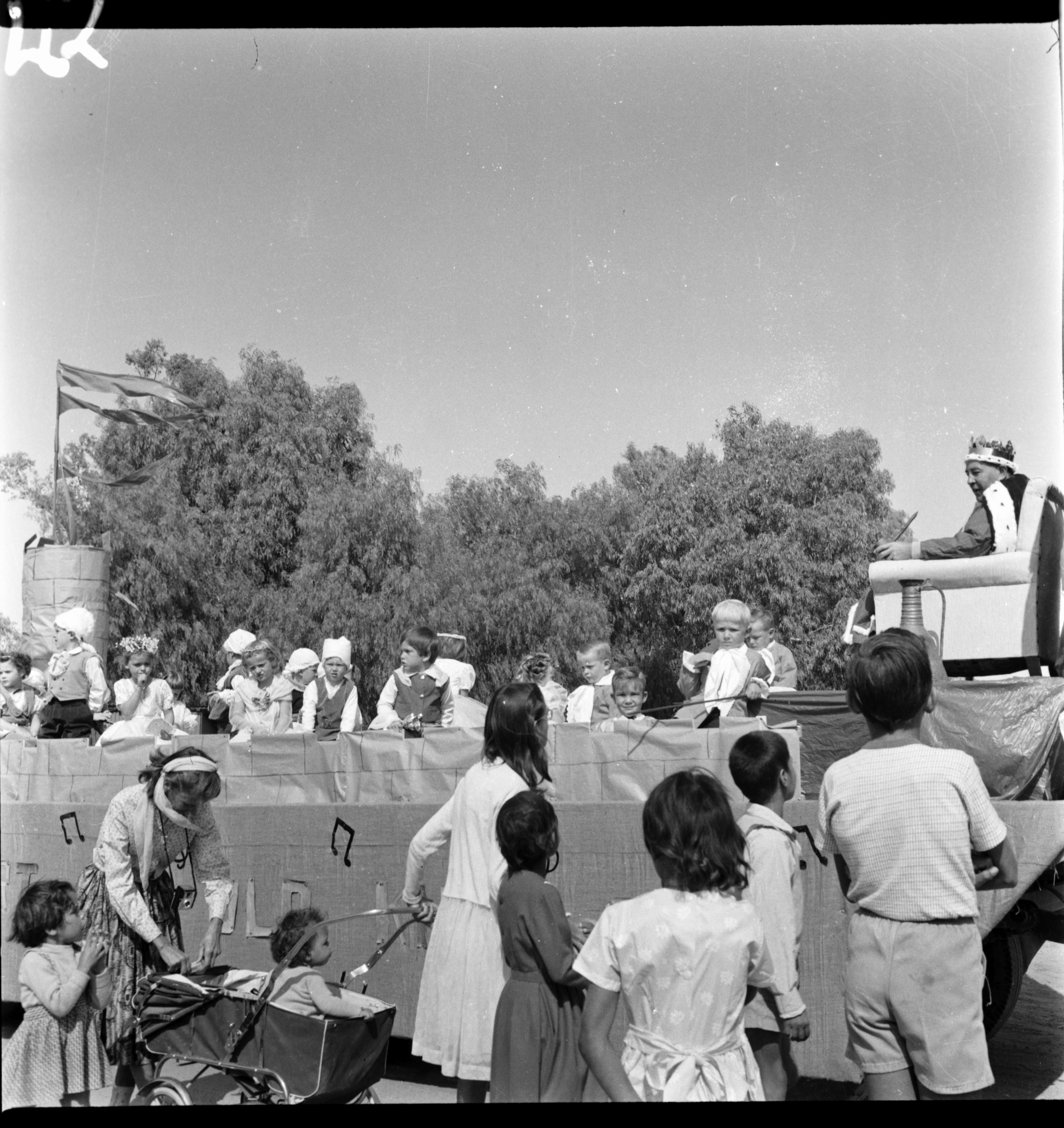
'The court of [illegible] Cole, Bangtail Muster, 1963

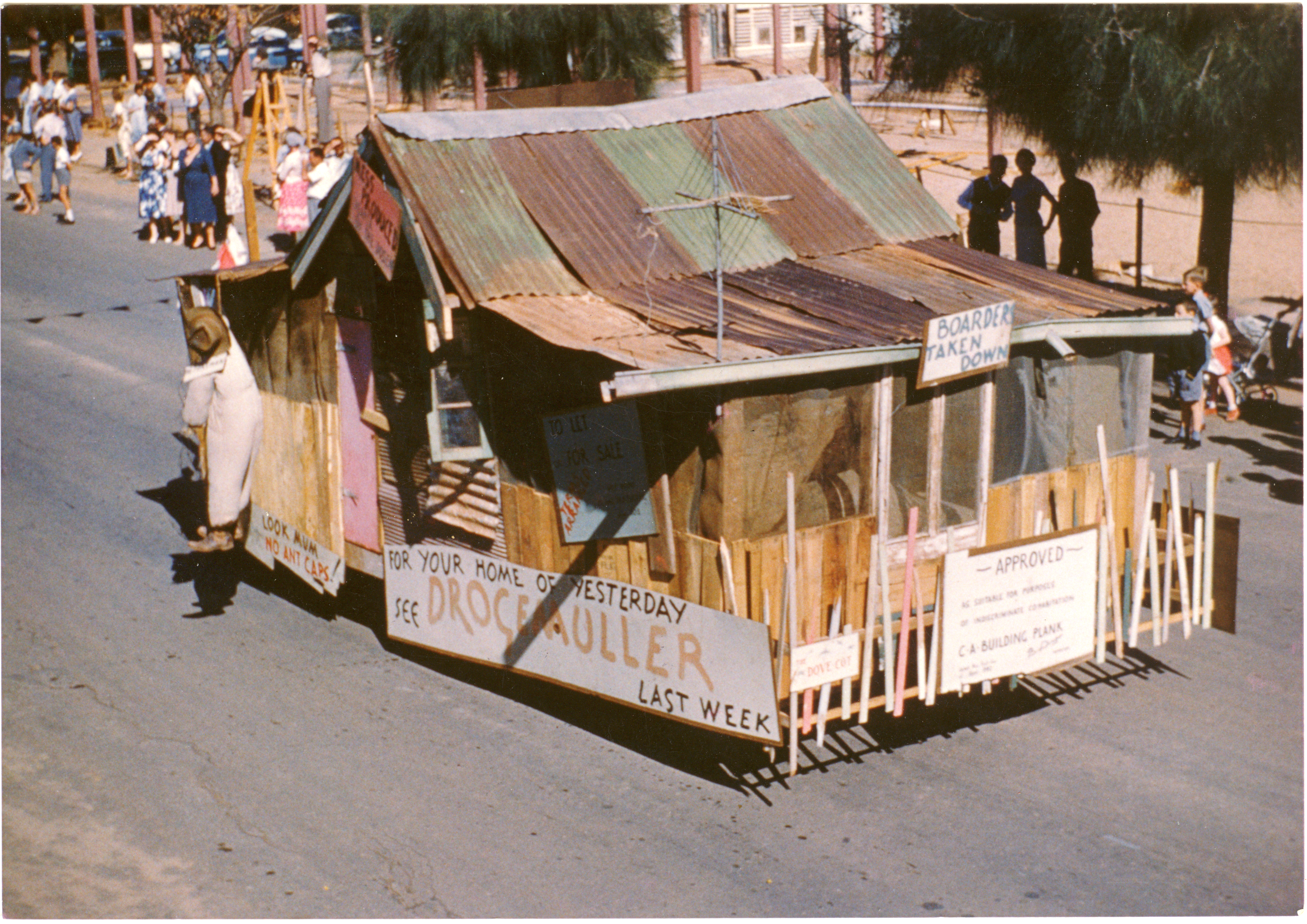
A protest float tin the Bangtail Muster, date unknown

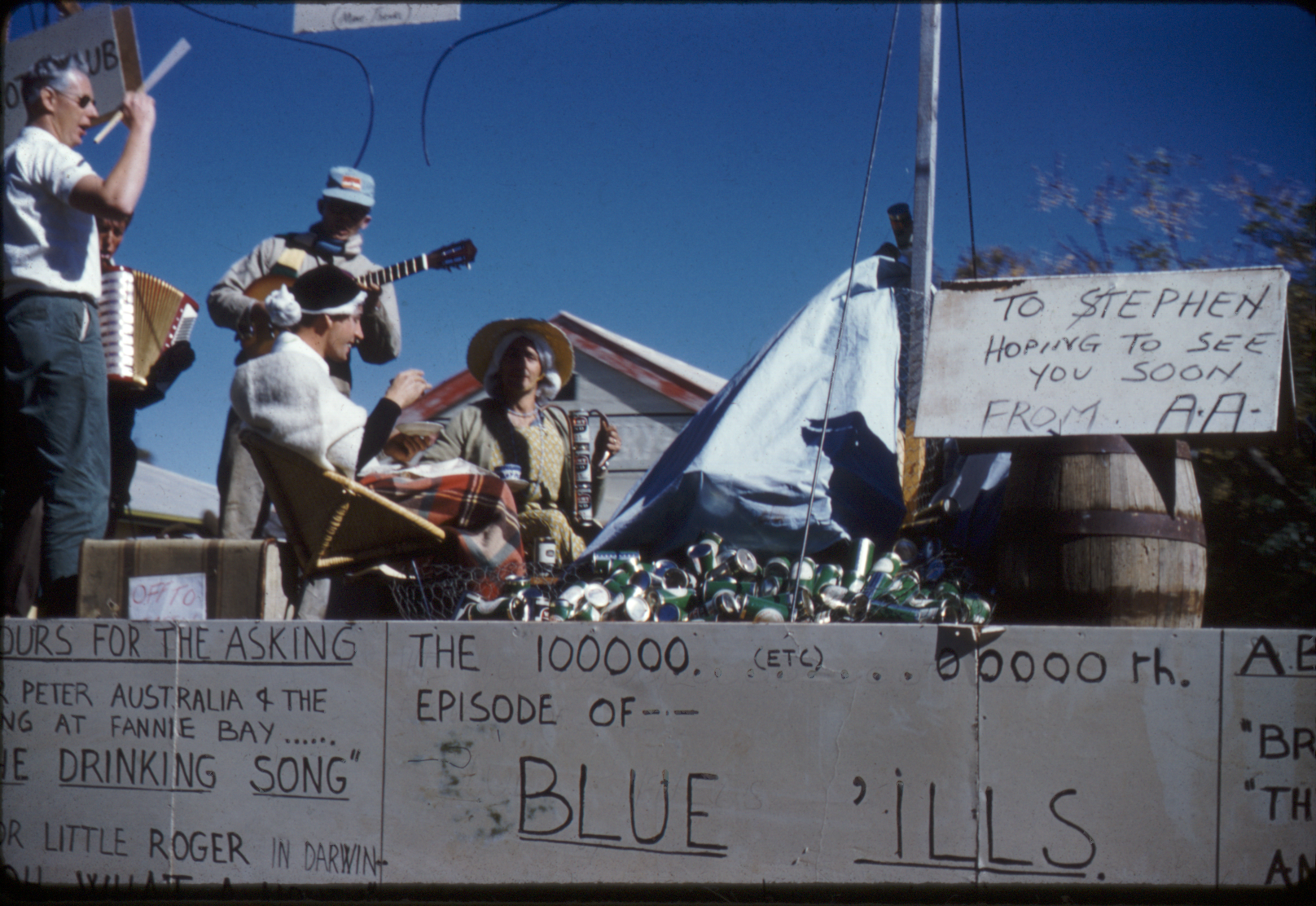
An Apex Club float celebrating singing and drinking, date unknown

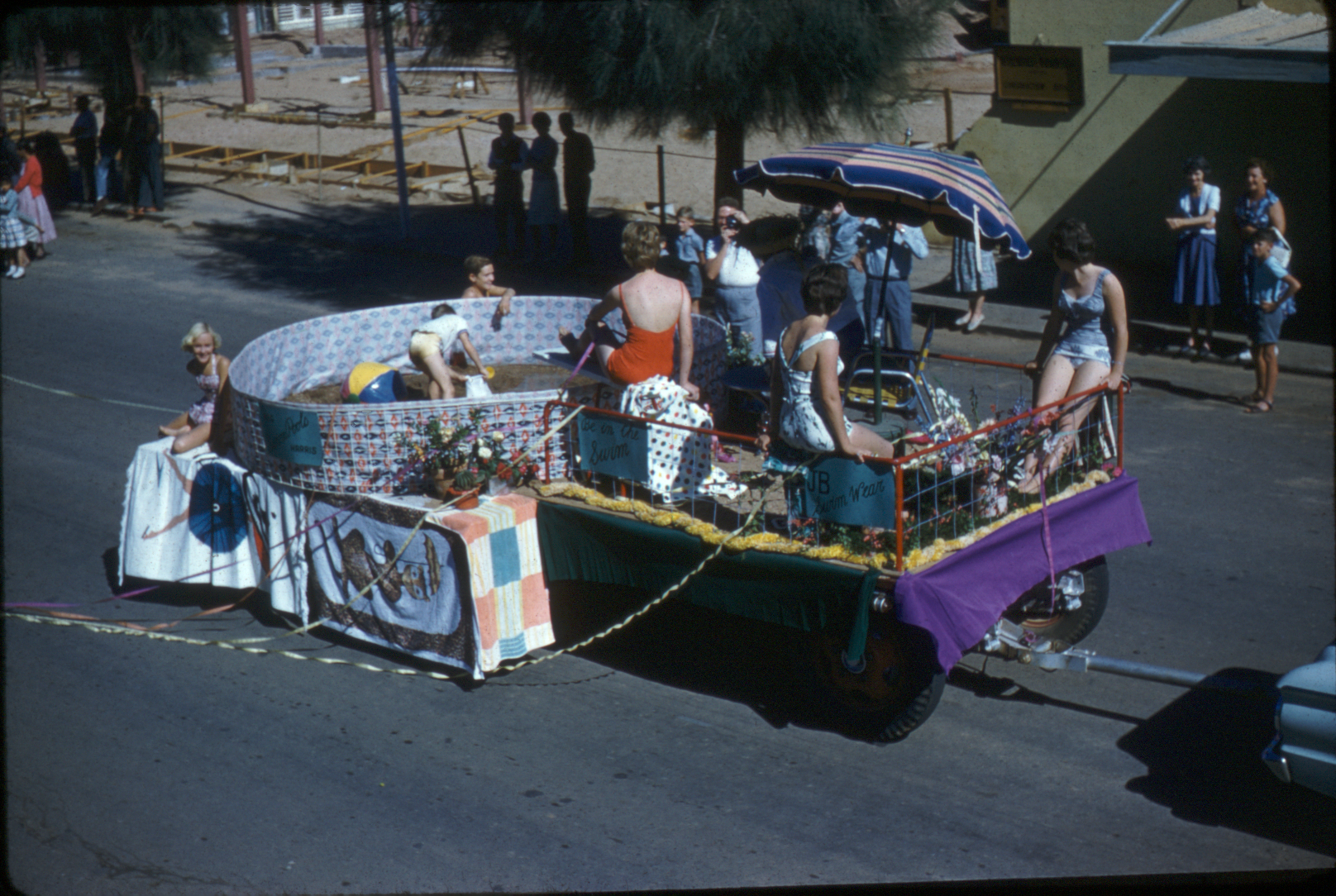
Rag Harris' float with swimming pool, date unknown

== See also ==
- Henley-on-Todd Regatta
- List of festivals in Australia
