= Henley-on-Todd Regatta =

"Boat" race in Alice Springs, Australia

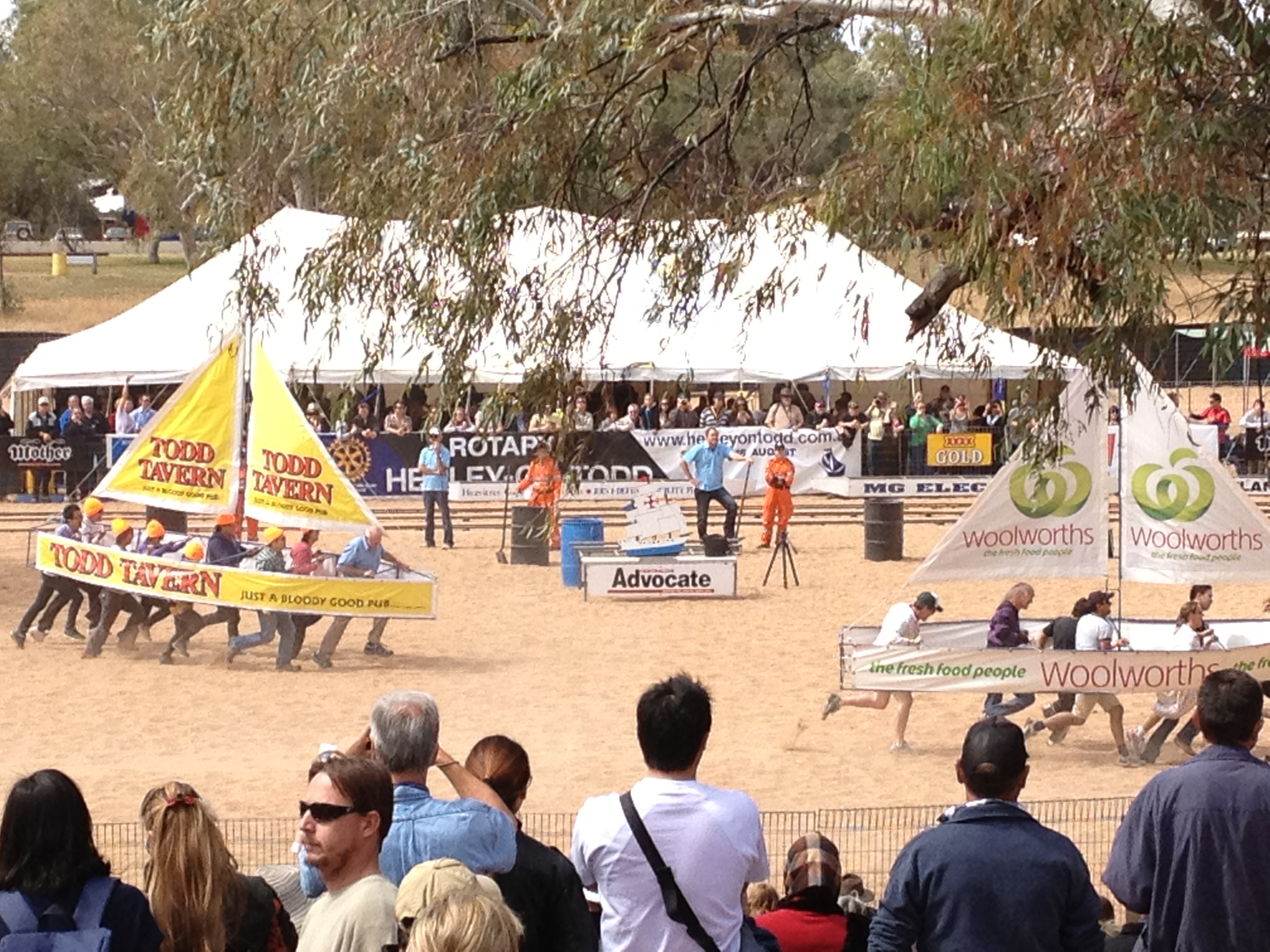
Competition at 51st Henley-on-Todd Regatta in August 2012

The Henley-on-Todd Regatta is a "boat" race held annually in the typically dry sandy bed of the Todd River (Lhere Mparntwe) in Alice Springs, Australia.

It began – and continues – cautiously as a joke at the expense of the original British colonisers and the formal atmosphere of the British river races which continue today. Every year on the third Saturday of August, the town holds a mock regatta which large numbers of locals and tourists attend. Food and drink are sold at stalls, "no fishing" signs are put up, and the celebration takes all day. It is the only dry river regatta in the world; thus, in 1993 the event was cancelled for the year due to water in the river. However, the Alice Springs Hash House Harriers and Katherine Hash House Harriers running groups put their boat entry into the water and completed the course under protest of the track officials. This was televised by ABC and shown around Australia on the nightly news.

"Boats" are made from metal frames and hung with banners and advertisements, and teams of "rowers" run their boats in races through the hot sand. Races are also held in washtubs, human-sized hamster wheels and at the final event, modified trucks decked out as boats are driven by teams armed with flour bombs and water cannon. Many bystanders end up as casualties of the final battle. Traditional teams include pirates and vikings, complete with costumes. Who wins the final battle can be difficult to determine; even the announcers occasionally get a blast.

== History ==
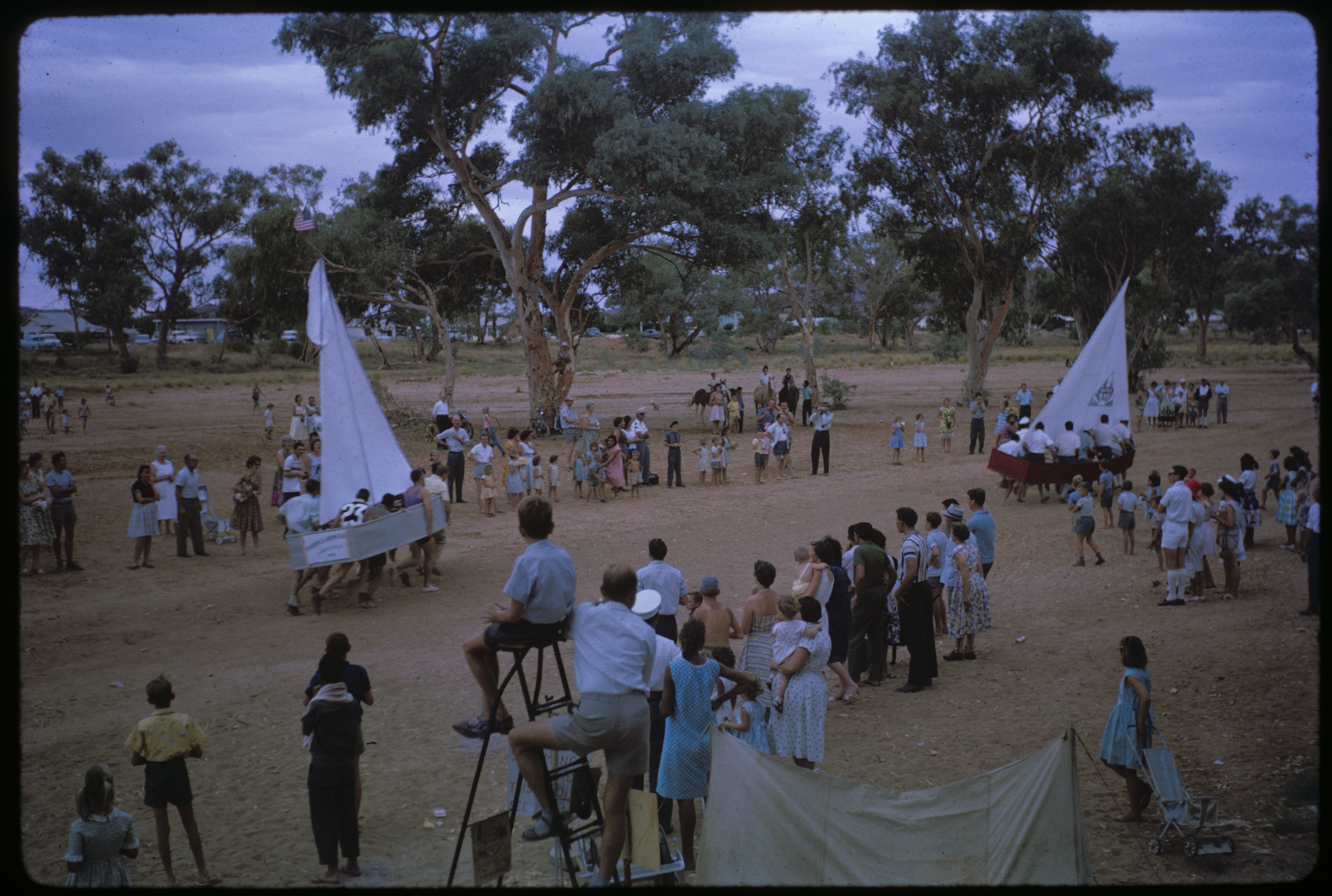
The first Henley-on-Todd in December 1962

Reg Smith at the Alice Springs Meteorological Bureau proposed an actual regatta along the lines of the famous Henley Royal Regatta (at Henley-on-Thames, thus the name of the regatta) in 1962. The idea was taken up by the Rotary club of Alice Springs, and despite the fact that the town was 1,500 kilometres (930 mi) from the nearest large body of water this was never seen as a problem.

The Henley-On-Todd Regatta is run entirely on a volunteer basis by a committee based in 'the Alice'. Funds raised go towards the three Rotary clubs based in Alice Springs.

== See also ==
- Bangtail muster
- List of festivals in Australia
