= Thai Culture and Food Festival =

Thai cultural festival in Melbourne, Australia

Coordinates: 37.817798°S 144.968714°E

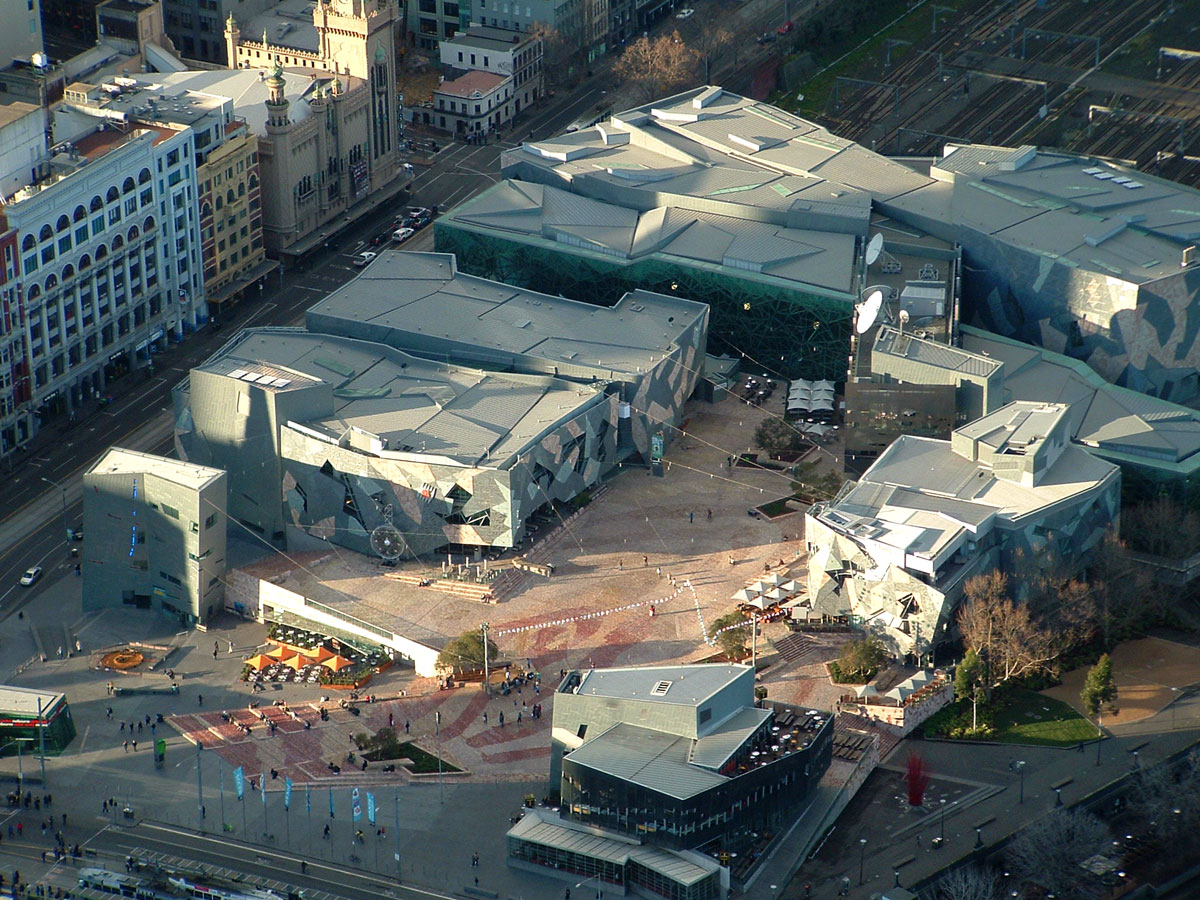
Aerial view of Federation Square, where the festival is held

The Thai Culture and Food Festival is a multicultural festival held at Federation Square in Melbourne, Victoria, Australia. Held since 2004, it attracts over 40,000 visitors to enjoy Thai food, music, traditional dance, martial arts and fashion.

== History ==
Victoria has a growing Thai community of over 10,000 people. The festival began in 2004 and was founded by Thai Culture and Food Festival Inc. a not-for-profit incorporated association in Melbourne, Australia to enable the Thai community to celebrate the traditional Songkran festival and to promote Thai culture and food to Australian audiences.

The festival usually starts with prayers by local Buddhist monks, followed by an opening ceremony with various dignitaries. Then on the main stage at Fed Square Thai dances are performed. Interspersed with other cultural performances are a number of special shows. In 2006, the 60th anniversary of King Bhumibol Adulyadej of Thailand ascension to the throne was celebrated with a performance by the Melbourne Jazz Ensemble of a number of the king's own jazz compositions. The 2007 Festival celebrated the king's 80th birthday.

Many of Melbourne's Thai restaurants sell Thai food from stalls on the riverside terrace. Thai products are sold from stalls in the main square.

== 2013 Program ==
The 10th Anniversary of Thai Culture and Food festival was held on 20 March 2013. The Australian Thai Artist Interchange were invited to present The Hua Krathi Project as part of the festival program. The Hua Krathi Project showcased contemporary Thai art across University, commercial galleries and public spaces. It was instigated and curated by Rushdi Anwar and Melanie Jayne Taylor.
