= Darwin International Guitar Festival =

Festival in Darwin, Northern Territory, Australia

Coordinates: 12°22′23″S 130°53′01″E

The Darwin International Guitar Festival was held once every two years at the Charles Darwin University, Darwin, Northern Territory, Australia. The festival attracted many Australian guitarists including Karin Schaupp, Saffire, and Slava Grigoryan. Many international stars, such as John Williams, also attended.

Australian composers such as Richard Charlton, Peter Sculthorpe and Nicholas Routley were also features of the festival.
