= I4Give Foundation =

Non-profit organisation to encourage forgiveness

i4Give Foundation
- Formation: December 2020
- Founder: Daniel & Leila Abdallah
- Region served: Australia
- Website: www.i4give.com

The I4Give Foundation (Stylised "i4Give Foundation") is an Australian non-profit organisation which aims to increase forgiveness amongst communities. The foundation is behind the i4Give day on 1 February, and the i4Give week which begins on 1 February and ends on 7 February. It is a large adovacte towards forgiveness in Australia, largely inspired by the Maronite Catholic belief of forgiveness.

== Background ==
On 1 February 2020, three of Daniel and Leila's Abdallah's children walked with their four other relatives down Bettington Road, Oatlands, to get ice cream. However, while walking, a driver identified as Samuel Davidson under the influence of drugs and alcohol struck the seven children, with the parents' three children and their cousin dying. The three other children were hospitalised, with two recovering afterwards, and one receiving permanent brain damage. Samuel was charged with 20 offences including four counts each of manslaughter, dangerous driving occasioning death, and driving with a high-range blood alcohol reading and driving through a red light. He later had his 28-year sentence reduced to 20 years, 15 of those years without parole. Three days after the deaths, Leila Abdallah publicly forgave the driver, stating "Right now I can't hate him [...] I think in my heart to forgive him, but I want the court to be fair. It's all about fairness. I'm not going to hate him, because that's not who we are." She later confirmed her forgiveness, stating "we have forgiven him so we are able to grieve peacefully". The crash occurred at the Oatlands Golf Course perimeter. A memorial 200 meters from site of the crash was proposed, but denied. Local Member of Parliament Geoff Lee, Prime Minister (at the time) Scott Morrison, and Oppositions Leader Chris Minns criticised the move, Lee calling it "cold hearted", and Morrison stating that the move was "distressing", and that he was talking to Australian Premier Dominic Perrottet about the denial. Daniel Abdallah labeled the move "disappointing". The memorial was later approved to be built, and was built on the Saturday 3 February 2024. Its opening was welcomed by politicians such as Anthony Albanese and Chris Minns. The family later had another child named Selina, a mix of the two daughters names that died in the incident, Sienna and Angelina.

== History and Development ==
=== Foundations and Growth ===
In December 2020, the i4Give foundation was founded, along with i4Give day and i4Give week, held for the first time on 1 February 2021. From June 2021, the "Four Angels" law was enforced in New South Wales, inspired by the death of the four children. The law gives a harsher penalty to drivers found to have a combination of illegal drugs and alcohol in their system. Leila Abdallah was named mother of the year in May 2021. In June 2022, the Abdallah family was invited to attend the World Meeting of Families 2022 in Rome. After the death of Queen Elizabeth II, Australian Prime Minister Anthony Albanese invited Daniel Abdallah to her funeral in September 2022, along with 10 other Australians for "extraordinary contributions to their communities", citing his founding of the i4Give Foundation and its influence within Australian communities. A three year annual grant of AUD $65,000 was contributed to the i4Give Foundation by City of Parramatta in 2023. A further $10,000 was granted by the City of Parramatta in 2026 for an "Olive Branch Community Gathering" on i4Give Day 2027 to "promote kindness, forgiveness, and meaningful community connection".

The family became good friends with former Prime Minister Scott Morrison. As of 2026, Morrison is the chairman of the i4Give foundation. In 2021, Morrison faced backlash after using a photo of his attendance at the launch of i4Give for a father's day tribute on Instagram.

=== Public Statements and Outreach ===
In August 2025, Daniel Abdallah sat down with the driver Samuel Davidson for a 7NEWS Spotlight interview, meeting at maximum security prison Cessnock Correctional Centre. The interview was allowed under "exceptional circumstances" after eight months of planning and work between the network, psychologists and Corrective Services NSW. Abdallah stated that he would let Davidson out of prison if he could, while Davidson disagreed and thought he "[didn't] deserve that". Abdallah further extrapolated on the idea of forgiveness, stating that at the end of Davidson's term, he would be invited to his "family home [for a] BBQ together" rather than the typical offender-victim relationship.

Following the assassination of Charlie Kirk in September 2025, and Erika Kirk's public statement of forgiveness of the alleged shooter Tyler Robinson, the i4Give foundation and it's chairman Scott Morrison commended Kirk's decision to forgive through official channels as a "powerful example of what Christianity calls us to". In 2026, on the sixth annual i4Give day, the i4Give Foundation called for families affected by the 2025 Bondi Beach shooting to "look at forgiveness [in tragedy]".

== i4Give Day ==
i4Give day is a reoccurring date hosted annually on 1 February. The date of the accident was chosen as the date for i4Give intentionally, in order to be remember the tragedy as a day of forgiveness rather than sadness. Its aim is to spread the message of forgiveness throughout Australia.

The New South Wales Government, former Prime Minister of Australia Scott Morrison and current Prime Minister Anthony Albanese have both expressed their encouragement of the day, Morrison choosing to publicly forgiving Barnaby Joyce at an i4Give event held within The Kings School in 2022.

On 1 February 2025, the fifth annual i4Give Day was held, during which Danny and Leila Abdallah launched the 4 Steps to Forgiveness at the Calyx in Sydney’s Royal Botanic Gardens. This four-step framework— to acknowledge, accept, surrender, and voice forgiveness—was named in honour of their four lost children and offers a structured approach to processing grief. The event was hosted by former Prime Minister Scott Morrison and attended by NSW Premier Chris Minns, along with the parents of the jailed driver. Leila Abdallah emphasised, “Forgiveness is a decision, not a feeling. It is for your peace, not for the other person".

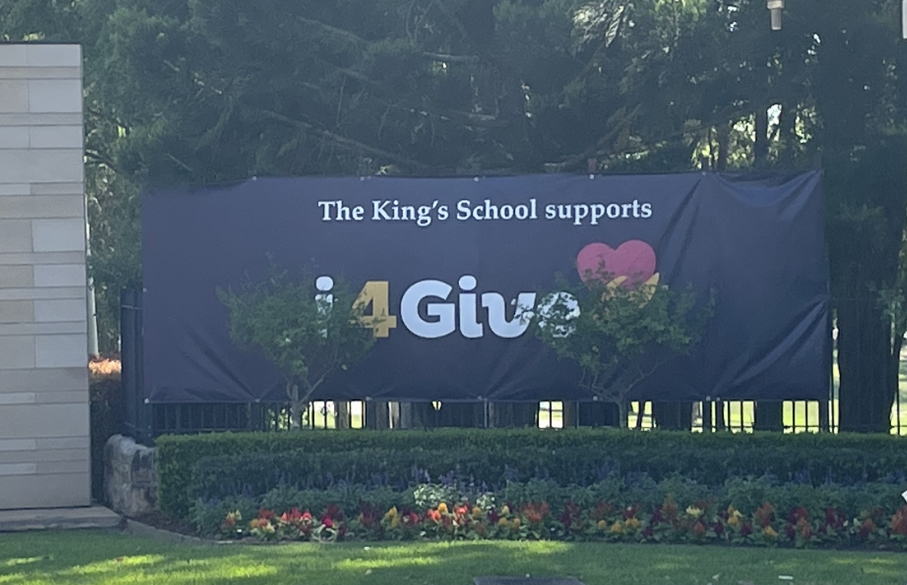
A temporary banner outside The King's School, Parramatta displaying their support for the i4Give Foundation in February 2023.

== i4Give Events ==
=== i4Give Week ===
The i4Give foundation also created a week long event named "i4Give week", which lasts from 1 February to 7 February annually, in which numerous actives are supposed to be held throughout.

=== i4Give Sunday ===
"i4Give Sunday" was also created, held on the Sunday within the first week of February, which encourages churches across Australia to "unite in a shared embrace of the Christ centred approach to forgiveness". The Kings School's "Kings Community Church" partnered with the foundation for a chapel service in 2022, which was live-streamed on YouTube. The service was also held in 2023, with then Headmaster Tony George making a speech.

=== i4Give Festival ===
The i4Give foundation runs a Gala Event on i4Give day every year, the first two being postponed due to covid. On 4 February 2023, the first free i4Give festival was held in Prince Alfred Park. The park was chosen as Leila Abdallah used to take her children to the park before the crash. Its aim was to encourage young people to start forgiving at a young age. Anthony Albanese held a speech at the event, and multiple members and former members of parliament attended, including Scott Morrison, Andrew Charlton, Dominic Perrottet, Chris Minns, and Donna Davis. Many members of the Canterbury-Bankstown Bulldogs Australian Rugby League team were also in attendance, who had previously supported the i4Give Cup in 2022. The father of the relative that died in the crash, Bob Sakr, also attended.

On 1 March 2025, the i4Give festival returned, supported by the Parramatta City Council.

=== i4Give Cup ===
The i4Give Cup is an event held by the i4Give foundation. It is a joint initiative between the National Rugby League (NRL) teams the Canterbury-Bankstown Bulldogs and the Parramatta Eels, in order to support the family and their decision to forgive. It was launched Tuesday 7 June 2022 at Accor Stadium by Bulldogs captain Josh Jackson and Eels captain Clint Gutherson. The event was attended by Bulldogs then-CEO Aaron Warburton, and former NRL players Tim Mannah, Terry Lamb and Hazem El Masri. The match was held between the Eels and the Bulldogs on 13 June 2022, with the i4Give cup presented by Daniel Abdullah to the winning team (the Bulldogs). It was held for a second time in 2023, on Monday 12 June at Accor Stadium, in which the Parramatta Eels won 34–12 against the Bulldogs. It was held in 2024 on 10 June 2024 between the Bulldogs and Eels, the bulldogs emerging victorious 22-18. It was further held again in 2025 and 2026.

In August 2024, junior rugby league clubs Carlingford Cougars and Dundas Shamrocks introduced their own version of the i4Give Cup, inspired by the Abdallah family's message of forgiveness. The initiative was driven by a friendship between Danny Abdallah and junior coach Oliver Samaha, aiming to promote unity and sportsmanship among young players. Players from both teams swapped jerseys as a symbolic gesture of camaraderie.

== See also ==
- List of guests at the state funeral of Elizabeth II
