= Newton's Nation =

Australian sports festival since 2008

Newton's Nation, originally Newton's Playground, is an Australian sports festival since 2008.

== History ==
=== 2008 ===
The initial Newton's Playground festival was run by Bathurst Council. The event was the idea of Simon Rollins, he was an events person at Bathurst Council, and looking for new ways to utilise Mt Panorama (a famous car racing track). The event would centre around skateboard and luge racing on Mt Panorama. Within the Australian downhill community Mount Panorama is a special destination. It is illegal to skate on the mountain, and it had been discussed many times on online forums such as Charlie Dont Skate about holding an event or race. Eddie Spearing, a New Zealand skater, contacted Bathurst Council about holding a slalom race on Mt Panorama. He posted on Charlie Don't Skate the original idea, and then rang Bathurst Council. He was put in contact with Simon Rollin, and the gravity games event was started. Bathurst Council was the main organiser, they contracted the sports organising bodies to provide the sports. The skateboard racing (downhill, luge, gravity bikes, slalom) was contracted to ASRA (Australian Skateboard Racing Association). ASRA was a very young sporting association, which was formed out of the Sydney skateboard slalom scene.

Sports in this initial festival included downhill skateboarding, slalom, street luge, classic luge, inline skating, gravity bike, BMX freestyle, Mountain Bike, Wake Boarding, Parkour and a skateboard mini ramp. Bands such as Grinspoon provided concerts.

The global downhill sanctioning body was IGSA. The first Newtons Playground was a World Cup under IGSA. The President Marcus Rietema was the IGSA official at Newtons. He thought the idea of a music festival wrapped around a gravity sports event a unique idea. He was prepared to grant the second event in 2009 World Championship status. Under IGSA rules, there were a certain number of events each year designated World Cup. Competitors would get ranking points for their finishing place in the race. Racer with the most points wins the World Cup. One of these events would be the World Championship race. The winner of this race would be crowned World Champion. Effectively there were two overall winners each year under IGSA: World Cup winner and World Championship. Newton's Playground was given World Championship status in 2009.

=== 2009 ===
Bathurst Council did not participate in the second year of Newton's Playground due to budget constraints. The event was privatised, Simon Rollin put together a consortium to run a second year of Newton's Playground. At the early stages of planning the venture was cancelled. Although the festival around Newton's Playground was cancelled, ASRA approached Bathurst Council and asked to run the IGSA World Championship event. Council agreed to let ASRA run the racing on Mt Panorama, and ASRA funded the event via rider fees, sponsorship and a NSW Sports department grant that recognised the significance of bringing a world class event to NSW. was to be the sanctioning bodyMost of the downhill sports events continued. The event was organized by the Australian Skateboard Racing Association (ASRA) and was sanctioned by the International Gravity Sports Association (IGSA) who designated the race as the 2009 World Championships. The Open Downhill Skateboarding World Championship was won by Kevin Reimer from Vancouver, Canada. Nick Duffield from Adelaide, an Australian won the Street Luge World Championship and Andy Lally from Decula, Georgia, USA was the Classic Luge World Championship. Brianne Davies from Vancouver, Canada won the Women's Downhill Skateboarding World Championship and Evren Ozan from Laguna Beach, California, USA was the Junior Downhill Skateboarding World Champion.

The event was significant due to the amateur ASRA event organiser putting on a World Championship event. The then President of ASRA Hagbath Strom resigned from his full-time job and spent 6 months organising the event. ASRA Vice President David Robinson and James Hopkin worked out of the first premises of Hopkin Skate on creating a way to film and broadcast the racing on Mt Panorama. There had been other downhill racing events that filmed and broadcast the racing, Newtons Playground was the first IGSA World Championship to be filmed from top to bottom and the racing was broadcast onto screens on the mountain. The technique was using the analogue output of a digital camera and sending the signal up a cat5 cable, using boosters to increase the signal, receiving the four video streams in a mixing desk in Castrol Tower, at the top of Mt Panorama, output to video screens and also capturing the feed to later upload online. It was the first time skaters from around the work watched racing within the day of it happening online.

The World Championships was called Newtons Playground. From the success of that 2009 event, Bathurst Council gave the rights to the event to another Simon Rollin consortium. The new event would be rebranded Newtons Nation, to move away from the Bathurst Council trademarks of Newtons Playground.

=== 2010 ===
Newton's Playground was renamed Newton's Nation by advertising firm Channel Zero. Newton's Nation Unit Trust was formed with the owners of Channel Zero, Popcorn Events and Mojo Events. This festival ran from 26 to 28 November including music by artists such as Bliss n Eso, You Am I and Birds of Tokyo. Roller-suit designer Buggy Rollin also appeared.

The festival conducted a promotional road trip of various Australian cities in October 2010 and October 2011.

=== 2012 ===
Ben Perry from Channel Zero took over Newtons Nation in 2012. In partnership with Samsung, it was a sports festival with live bands.

Vert skateboarding made its first appearance with Renton Miller headlining the demonstrations

Last year of downhill racing under the IGSA.

First year of live racing broadcast on YouTube, a world first.

=== 2013 ===
Newtons Nation in 2013 was extreme sports only, no music.

Downhill racing was the first World Cup under the new global body International Downhill Federation (IDF)

=== 2017 ===
The race was revived in February 2017 as the first leg of the International Downhill Federation (IDF) World Cup series.
