= Soulfest festival =

Soulfest was a music festival held in 2014 featuring Australian and international artists. Venues included Sydney, Melbourne, Brisbane and Auckland. Soulfest's music was solely jazz, hip hop, RnB and neo-soul.

== History ==
The idea for the festival came from the promoter John Denison, who is the director at International Entertainment Group. He wanted to create a smaller festival with a different feel which would stand out in Australia, focusing on hip hop and neo-soul. Soulfest was first held in October 2014 at variety of popular venues across Australia and New Zealand to much acclaim from both fans and critics.

On 11 May 2015, Soulfest announced its return for its second year. The first artist announcement included the Mary J Blige, Jill Scott, Jhene Aiko, Charlie Wilson, De La Soul, Talib Kweli, Floetry, Eric Benét, Dwele, Daniel Merriweather, Kamasi Washington, Remi, Dj Trey and Thandi Phoenix. The 2015 festival was cancelled due to poor ticket sales.

== Artist line-ups ==
The 2014 line-up included D'Angelo, Common, Maxwell, Angie Stone, Mos Def, Antony Hamilton, Aloe Blacc, Musiq Soulchild, Leela James, Ms. Murphy, Miracle, Thandi Phoenix, Milan Ring, Nathaniel Willemse, Ngaiire, Bec Laughton, Mark Lowndes, Jordan Rakei, Noah Slee, Gang of Brothers, Darryl Beaton and the D1 Cartel, M-Phazes, Sovereign, Inigo, EMRSN.

== Venues ==
Sidney Myer Music Bowl, Victoria Park Broadway, Western Springs Stadium, Riverstage Amphitheatre.
