= Rollercoaster (Australian festival) =

- Genre: Rock music & Alternative rock
- Dates: December
- Location: Mandurah, Western Australia
- Years active: 2005–2008
- Organiser: Peel Projects
- Website: Official website

Rollercoaster was an annual Australian music festival held at the western foreshore (Hall Park) at Mandurah in December. The festival mainly featured modern rock music.

The first festival was held in 2005 with approximately 9,700 patrons, with between 8,500 and 9,000 people attending in 2007. The headliners for the 2007 concert were originally The Black Keys (the first international act to perform at Rollercoaster) however the band had to withdraw due to a family member's illness and they were replaced by You Am I.

The largest musical festival however was the 'Mandurah Festival' held in January, 1994 for which the headlining act was INXS, who drew an attendance of 12,000 people.

== Artist lineups by year (incomplete) ==
26 December 2005

The Living End, Gyroscope, Spiderbait, End of Fashion, Karnivool, Kisschasy, Cowtown, The Fuzz

26 December 2006

Grinspoon, Frenzal Rhomb, The Butterfly Effect, Gyroscope, Downsyde, Behind Crimson Eyes, Cowtown, Birds of Tokyo

29 December 2007

Hilltop Hoods, You Am I, Shihad, Kisschasy, Jebediah, Birds of Tokyo, Ash Grunwald, Sneaky Weasel Gang

27 December 2008

The Living End, Gyroscope, Sneaky Sound System, Cut Copy, Operator Please, The Teenagers (France), Tame Impala
