= Ballarat Begonia Festival =

Carnival and community cultural festival

Coordinates: 37°32′49″S 143°49′18″E

- Genre: Carnival, Flower Show
- Dates: Labour Day long weekend, March
- Frequency: annual
- Locations: Ballarat, Lake Wendouree, Ballarat Botanical Gardens
- Years active: 73
- Inaugurated: 1953
- Attendance: 28,000 (2012)
- Organiser: City of Ballarat
- Website: http://www.ballaratbegoniafestival.com/

Ballarat Begonia Festival is a carnival and community cultural festival held annually in Ballarat, Victoria, Australia. Run since 1953, it is a major tourist attraction of the city. Themed around the begonia flower which blooms in the temperate Ballarat climate, traditional features of the festival programme include floral displays and plantings on the main city streets, a centrepiece parade down Sturt Street including floats constructed by local community groups including sporting clubs, businesses, educational institutions, musicians and special interest groups and military tattoo.

== Origins ==
The festival was inspired by the success of the Edinburgh Festival, with the first plans for a similar festival in Australia and Ballarat put forward by then Ballarat Mayor William Ernest Roff and Greater Ballarat Association president Edgar Bartrop in June 1952 with an aim of setting up a festival before the Melbourne 1956 Summer Olympics. The concept quickly gained favour with the community and in late 1952, an organising committee was formed and the decision was made to fast-track the festival for the following year. A begonia theme was selected to promote the city's reputation for begonia gardens.

== History ==
The first festival was held on 12 March 1953. Run by the Greater Ballarat Association and facilitated by the Department of Education, it was known as the Ballaarat Begonia Festival. A parade of 6,000 students witnessed by 20,000 was held in the city, including the Begonia Dance and other folkdances and crowning of the "Queen of the Begonias", trade displays and songs from the Ballarat choir. 100,000 begonia plants were placed in planter boxes along the city's main streets and the civic centre at Alfred Hall on Grenville Street was used as an exhibition space for the first flower show.

The second Begonia Festival featured a visit from Queen Elizabeth II. With Alfred Hall having been damaged by fire, the floral displays moved from the city centre to the Botanic Gardens.

During the 1990s, the event began to wane in popularity and in the face of dwindling attendance organisers struggled to finance its coordination.

The City of Ballarat took over the running of the festival in 1996 providing additional funding however attendances continued to decline until organisers more than once threatened to end the festival. A partial revival in attendances was marred by poor weather in 2010. However the publicity generated by the threat of its cancelation rallied the community behind the event and new attendance records were set in 2011 and 2012 due in part through increased promotion by newly created Ballarat Regional Tourism.

Attendance
2008	16,000
2009	15,500
2010	13,998
2011	23,500
2012	28,500

The 2021 Festival was scheduled for 6 – 28 March.
