= Ignite Film Festival =

Film festival

Coordinates: 33°50′20.32″S 151°12′32.96″E

- Location: Sydney, Australia
- Established: 2004

The Ignite Film Festival is a Christian short film festival held annually in Sydney, Australia. The major goal of the festival is to develop young Christian film makers and to encourage people to be creative about communicating the truths of the Bible. Each film is no longer than five minutes and includes the theme for the year.

== Ignite Film Festival themes ==
Each year, Ignite Film Festival has a theme of an item or action being incorporated in the entry films to ensure that they are unique.

- 2013 - Joy
- 2012 - Hope
- 2011 - Life
- 2010 - Love
- 2009 - Animals
- 2008 - Rock or Stone
- 2007 - Light
- 2006 - Fire
- 2005 - H_{2}O
- 2004 - Parable

== Winners ==
- 2013 - White as Snow - Directed by Leah Beanland
- 2012 - Centre - Directed by Michael Snowdon
- 2011 - Abide With Me - Directed by Matt Nelson and Damien Madden. Sanctity of Life Category - Dear Mum - Directed by Anthony Vallejos
- 2010 - Remember Me - Directed by David Cairns
- 2009 - Enmity - Directed by Matthew Carson-Drever
- 2008 - Atarashii Tabidachi
- 2007 - A Great Light
- 2006 - Arthur
- 2005 - Love Thy Neighbour - Directed by James Cogswell & Will Mitchell
- 2004 - The Great Feast - Directed by Tim Andrews
