= CoastFest =

Music festival in New South Wales, Australia

CoastFest is a three-day music event held on the Central Coast of New South Wales, Australia, at The Point Wolstoncroft Sport and Recreation Camp Gwandalan on Lake Maquarie. The event hosts Blues & Roots, World, Folk and Alternative musicians, as well as a host of local performers.

The festival also features:

- Dance Workshops and Performance
- Indigenous Space and activities
- Poetry and Storytelling
- Art Space and Craft Workshops, featuring the work of local artists
- Tipi Talking Space and Healing Village
- Chai Tent and Acoustic Jam Space
- Drama, Theatre and Circus
- Kids Festival and Activities
- Film and Multimedia
- Drum circle and stomping ground for dance and fire-twirling
- World food stalls and market place
- Fire Event and Festival finale.

The event is primarily a music festival which encourages "non-mainstream" genres, such as Traditional Folk, World music, Blues and Roots, as well as Alternative, Fusion and Contemporary Acoustic music. The Festival is also a celebration of the Art & Culture of the Central Coast and includes, dance, theatre, visual arts and crafts. It also encourages participation by various cultural and community groups to demonstrate and share their skills, customs, beliefs and modes of spirituality, both during the festival and throughout the planning process.

The festival celebrates the home of the Darkinjung people and the "Land of Whale Dreaming". It promotes a sustainable future for the Central Coast and its people by encouraging the participation of environmental and conservation groups and speakers in its "EcoFest" area. The festival is "not for profit", however it is managed so as to be financially sustainable, and able to cover costs, expenses and future development.

CoastFest organisers implement systems and policies to run the organization and the festival using principles which lessen the impact it has on the environment. During EcoFest and throughout the festival itself, organisers strive to demonstrate and encourage the sharing of knowledge, ideas, information and techniques which ensures a sustainable future for the people of the Central Coast.

CoastFest is more than a traditional "Folk Festival", and it evolves as time goes by. It is created by, and as a celebration for, the people of the Central Coast. Part of the aim of the CoastFest organization is to develop a new sense of community, through participation and interaction, and to be inclusive rather than exclusive.

Much emphasis is given to community involvement in the planning process itself, the Festival should then be seen as a culmination of community endeavour and collaboration. The primary theme for CoastFest is Unity, Community, Family & Diversity, it demonstrates that we can all come together to celebrate our differences.

According to their official website the festival last ran from 5 to 7 September in 2008 and that there would be none in the following year, due to lack of funding, although the organisers were negotiating for a venue for 2010. However, as from March 2012 the festival had not reappeared.
