= Live at the Zoo =

2008 music festival in Australia

- Genre: Indie, alternative, dance, hip-hop, electronic
- Dates: 10–13 April (Easter Long Weekend)
- Location: Australia: Monarto, South Australia
- Years active: 2008

Live at the Zoo was a music festival held over the Easter long weekend at Monarto, South Australia in 2008. It lasted from 10 to 13 April and was a multiple day music/camping festival. The event consisted of 4 stages. The main stage which hosted the headline International and Local bands, the Chimp tent where local bands performed, the all night dance tent which ran for 54 hours from 12.01 Saturday morning through to dawn on Monday morning and the final stage was the Acacia Circuittree which was a non-stop beats stage.

The festival was panned as a failure. Because the festival did not sell enough tickets, a number of the bar staff and security walked out rather than work unpaid, leading to general anarchy as concertgoers helped themselves to the alcoholic beverages.
