= The Grass Is Greener (festival) =

Music festival in Queensland, Australia

- Genre: Australian, Rock, Alternative Rock, Indie Rock, Hip-hop, Electronic
- Dates: October
- Locations: Cairns and Gold Coast, Queensland, Australia (2016-present) Canberra and Bendigo (2022-present)
- Years active: 2016–present
- Website: http://thegrassisgreener.com.au/

The Grass Is Greener is an annual all ages music festival that is held in Cairns and The Gold Coast, Queensland (Previously in Mackay, Australia). Their first festival was held on Saturday April 23, 2016 in Cairns, Queensland.

== Lineups year by year ==
As listed on the official website.

=== 2016 ===
==== April ====
- Allday (rapper)
- Will Sparks
- Slumberjack
- Ivan Ooze
- Gill Bates
- Tigerilla

==== October ====
- Hermitude
- LDRU
- Lookas (USA)
- Spit Syndicate
- Tired Lion
- Benson
- Feki
- Nora En Pure (ZA)
- Pon Cho
- Mallrat
- Getso
- Tenzin

=== 2017 ===
- Peking Duk
- Allday
- What So Not
- Ocean Alley
- British India
- Sachi (NZ)
- Willow Beats
- Greta Stanley
- Enschway
- Ekali (CAN)
- J-el
- Faure
- Drewboy & The Sax Addicts
- Will Anderson

=== 2018 ===
- Carmouflage Rose
- Darude (FIN)
- Dear Seattle
- Ember
- Emme (CAN)
- Godlands
- Hayden James
- Herobust (USA)
- J-el
- k?d (USA)
- Kinder
- Kota Banks
- Kwame
- Luca Brasi
- Made in Paris
- Manu Crooks
- Noah Devega
- Perto
- ShockOne
- Safia
- The Jungle Giants
- Xavier Mayne
- Tenzin

=== 2019 ===
- Tyga (USA)
- Amy Shark
- Hermitude
- Peking Duk DJ set (Gold Coast only)
- Golden Features
- The Veronicas
- Mallrat
- Crooked Colours
- Habstrakt (FRA)
- Holy Goof (UK)
- The Kite String Tangle
- The Aston Shuffle
- Kolombo (BEL)
- Graace
- Jordan Burns
- Choomba
- Sophiegrophie
- Taleena
- Reynier
- Jake Carmody
- SVLT (Gold Coast only) (USA)
- Lachy Faure (Cairns only)
- Hosted by Tenzin

=== 2022 ===
- Alok (BRA)
- Aluna (UK)
- Boo Seeka
- Brux
- Crush3D
- ~~Jordan Burns~~
- Juno Mamba (Geelong only)
- Little Fritter
- Market Memories
- ~~Mashd N Kutcher~~
- Maya Jane Coles (UK)
- ~~Mikalah Watego~~
- ~~Mood Swing & Chevy Bass~~
- ~~Noy~~
- ~~Onefour~~
- ~~Piero Pirupa (ITA)~~
- Pnau
- Sidepiece (USA) (Gold Coast and Canberra only)
- Sticky Fingers
- TDJ (CAN)
- The Grogans (Geelong only)
- Ty Dolla $ign (USA)
- ~~Vnssa (USA)~~
- Volaris (UK)
- Wafia (Cairns only)
- Wongo
- YG (USA)
- ~~Zero (UK)~~
- Zhu (USA) DJ Set
