= Listen Out =

Australian annual multi-city outdoor music festival

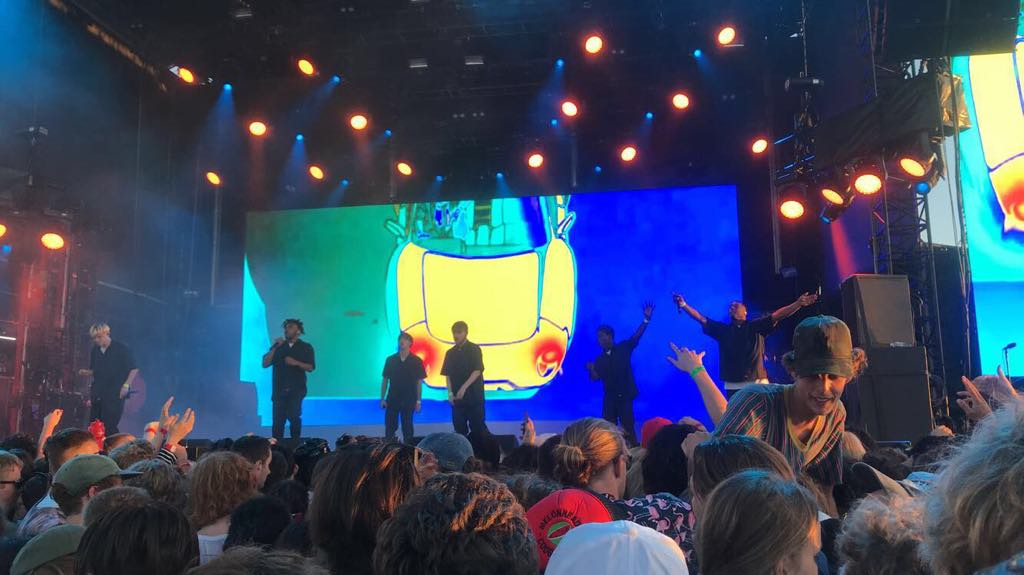
- Brockhampton performing at Listen Out 2018
- Genre: Hip-Hop, Indie, and Electronic
- Dates: September–October
- Locations: Sydney, Melbourne, Perth, Brisbane
- Years active: 2013–present
- Organiser: Fuzzy Operations
- Website: Fuzzy official website

Listen Out is an annual Australian music festival held in Sydney, Perth, Melbourne and Brisbane since September 2013. In 2018, an inaugural alternative version of Listen Out, titled Listen In took place in South Australia and New Zealand. The standard festival is held from late September to early October. Each Listen Out concert is a one-day event attracting both domestic and international hip-hop, indie, and electronic musicians. Listen Out uses three stages; Atari stage, 909 stage and Third base (formerly branded by Red Bull as Crate Diggers stage and Universal Store's Young Bloods stage).

Listen Out has been organised since inception by Fuzzy Operations. It attracted over 68,000 attendees during its 2016 festival tour. In parallel with the festival national youth radio Triple J runs an Unearthed competition, where the state winner performs at their capital's venue. The 2020 and 2021 festivals were cancelled due to the COVID-19 pandemic in Australia. It resumed in 2022 and continues to the present.

== History ==
Listen Out was created by Fuzzy after they had cancelled another music festival, Parklife. The new festival has an emphasis on "intelligent strains of dance music". Listen Out's inaugural tour commenced on 28 September 2013 in Sydney, before proceeding to Perth and then Melbourne and finishing in Brisbane. and continued as an annual event. It consists of three stages, two of which (Atari and 909’s) have identical artist line-ups. The Atari stage is the festival's main stage and features the head-liners of the festival. The 2013 and 2014 tour allocated only electronic music acts to perform on the Atari stage, with Indie and Hip-hop acts taking place on the 909 stage. theMusic.com.au's writer described the 2014 festival, "boutique national dance music event. bringing quality dance music to four spectacular inner city venues."

From 2015 onward, these roles were changed as Hip-Hop acts now exclusively occurred on the Atari stage and the 909 stage became exclusively electronic music. Unlike these stages, Third base stage is used to showcase local upcoming talent from each state, with different line-ups for each leg of the show. In more recent iterations of the event, these line-ups now contain acts that tour with the festival over multiple venues, however minor tweaks are made to each state's line-up to continue showcasing local talent for each. From 2013 to 2015 the festival's third stage was sponsored by Red Bull as the Crate Diggers stage. In 2016 after Fuzzy lost its Red Bull sponsorship, the stage was sponsored by Universal Store and re-branded the Young Bloods stage. In 2017 Fuzzy formally changed it to 3rd Base, without financial support of any sponsor.

Each year the winners of the annual Triple J Unearthed competition for each state were given a time slot for the related Listen Out concert. The winner performed on either the Atari or 909 stage depending on the year. In 2018 Fuzzy began a new, smaller version of Listen Out named Listen In to reach audiences in South Australia and New Zealand featuring a smaller selection of six acts from the longer Listen Out version of the tour. In 2019 the South Australian Listen In festival was announced but the New Zealand leg of the tour is yet to be announced. The 2020 and 2021 Listen Out festivals were all cancelled due to the COVID-19 pandemic in Australia. They resumed in 2022 and continues to the present.

== Artist line-up by year ==
=== 2013 ===
2013
Atari	909	Crate Diggers			
Softwar (Sydney only); El Dario (Perth only); Otologic (Melbourne only); Nick WoodWard (Brisbane only); Laura Jones; Rüfüs; Miguel Campbell; Classixx; Azealia Banks; Duke Dumont; Disclosure	Cosmo's Midnight (Triple J Unearthed; Sydney only); Hayden James (Sydney only); Yahtzel (Sydney only); Sable (Triple J Unearthed; Perth only); Slumberjack (Perth only); Zeke (Perth only); Andee Frost (Melbourne only); Friendships (Triple J Unearthed; Melbourne only); Motez (Melbourne only); Gurps (Brisbane only); Rattraps (Triple J Unearthed; Brisbane only); Tyler Touché (Brisbane only); Alunageorge; John Talabot; Just blaze; TNGHT; Touch sensitive	(Sydney): Paradise Lost; Sosueme; Slow Blow; John Glover; Beni	(Perth): Drifter & Pussymittens; France China; Black & Blunt; Charlie Bucket; Oli & James A; Gracie & Sistym	(Melbourne): Scattermusic; Fletch; Simon TK; Sleep D Plays; Flip 3k & David Bass; Post Percy; Salvador & Les Level	(Brisbane): Aydos & Brat Camp; OP thomas Prime & Charlie Hustle; Benn Hopkins & Bruno Watt; Cosmo Cater; Stretch paper cranes & Audun

=== 2014 ===
2014
Atari	909	Crate Diggers			
UV boi (Triple J Unearthed); Just a Gent (Triple J Unearthed; Sydney only); Slumberjack (Triple J Unearthed; Perth only); Deja (Triple J Unearthed; Melbourne only); UV boi (Triple J Unearthed winner; Brisbane only); Bondax; Chet faker; Flume; Golden features; Kilter; Totally Enormous Extinct Dinosaurs; Yahtzel; ZHU	Four Tet; Schoolboy Q; Shlohmo; Snakehips; Ta-Ku; Tkay Maidza; Young Fathers	(Sydney): Ben Morris; Joyride; Kali; Low Motion; Motorik; Playmode; Wordlife	(Perth): Casual Connection; Genga & Benny P; Gracie + Sistym; Micah Black; Philly Blunt; Shaddow Brothers; Troy Division & Bunj	(Melbourne): Butters; Edd Fisher; Hans DC; Jack Love & Jacob Malmo; Matt Radovich; Ollie Holmes; Sweetland	(Brisbane): Approche & Elleyet; Audun & Sessionkatz; Mr Sparkles & Pete Smith; Silvertouch & Nicky Doof; Sweeney & Tucker; Thomas Prime & Jazzy Jeff; Varcity & Gurps

=== 2015 ===
2015
Atari	909	Crate Diggers			
Alison Wonderland; Childish Gambino (USA); Client Liaison; Halfway Crooks; ILoveMakonnen (USA); Joey Badass (USA); Jordan Burns; Odesza (USA); Rae Sremmurd (USA)	B Wise (Triple J Unearthed; Sydney only); GRRL PAL (Triple J Unearthed; Perth only); Running Touch (Triple J Unearthed; Melbourne only); Feki (Triple J Unearthed; Brisbane only); Dusky (UK); George FitzGerald (UK); Golden Features; Hayden James; Lido (NOR); Roland Tings; Ryan Hemsworth (CAN); Sbtrkt (UK)	(Sydney): Ariane; Bad Ezzy; Discovery; Moriarty; Motorik; Tom Tilley; Typhonic	(Perth): Black & Blunt; Deadweight; Discovery; Genga & Oh Dear!; Klean Kicks & Aslan; Shadow Brothers; Troy Division	(Melbourne): Ara Koufax; Brooklyn Queenz; Discovery; Dizz 1; Jack love; Jonno Haze; Mat cant	(Brisbane): Charlie Hustle; Discovery; Jimmy D & MJ Monsta; Jordan James & Kendall Banks; Lachness & Lavitz; Mark Maxwell; Percy Miracles

=== 2016 ===
2016
Atari	909	Young Bloods			
Anderson Paak and Free Nationals (USA); ASAP Ferg (USA); Baauer (USA); Joy; Ngaiire; One Day; Rüfüs; Stormzy (UK); Sui Zhen; Travis Scott (USA); Yung Lean (SWE)	Wallace (Triple J Unearth; Sydney onlyed); Tobacco Rat (Triple J Unearthed; Perth only); Alice Ivy (Triple J Unearthed; Melbourne only); Midas.Gold (Triple J Unearthed; Brisbane only); Claptone (GER); Cosmo's Midnight; Gorgon City (UK); Jauz (USA); LDRU; Tash Sultana; Tchami (FRA); Willow Beats	(Sydney): Colour Castle; Elijah Scadden; Flex Mami; Gradz; Honey DJs; Made in Paris; Turquoise Prince LTC	(Perth): Amber Akilla & D A W S; Avance & Childish Antics; Axen; Bockman & Shobu; CasueL; Chino Gambino; Command Q; Time Pilot	(Melbourne): Airwolf; Ara Koufax; One Puf; Pillow Pro; SAL; Smutlee; MIMI	(Brisbane): Doe vs Nado; Lastlings; Macey Cherry vs Crvcks; Mutual Friends DJs; No vs Yvng Jalapeno; Quix; Turqoise Prince LTC

=== 2017 ===
2017
Atari	909	3rd Base			
Bryson Tiller (USA); Future (USA) (Melbourne, Perth only) ^{[A]}; Hermitude (Sydney and Brisbane only); Jai Wolf (USA); Little Simz UK); Mac Miller (USA); Mallrat; Safia; What So Not	Mookhi (Triple J Unearthed; Sydney only); Feels (Triple J Unearthed; Perth only); King IV (Triple J Unearthed; Melbourne only); Miss Blanks (Triple J Unearthed; Brisbane only); Duke Dumont (UK); Getter (USA); Green Velvet (USA); Kučka; Malaa (FRA); Pnau; Touch sensitive; Vallis Alps	(Sydney): Alice Ivy; Annie Bass; Clyspo; Kayex; Ninajirachi; Nyxen; Willaris K	(Perth): Alice Ivy; Elise Keddie; Ninajirachi; Nyxen; Palais; Spire; Tobacco Rat	(Melbourne): Alice Ivy; CC:Disco!; Muto; Ninajirachi; Nyxen; One Puf	(Brisbane): Alice Ivy; Lowdown; Kid Fiction; Ninajirachi; Nyxen; Skorpio; Varcity

Notes

- A Future withdrew from Sydney and Brisbane and returned to USA for personal reasons. Hermitude were announced as replacements. Future returned back to Sydney and Brisbane for replacement shows in February 2018.

=== 2018 ===
2018
Atari	909	3rd Base			
ASAP Rocky (USA); Brockhampton (USA); Haiku Hands; Kira Puru; ~~Lil Skies (USA)~~; Noname (USA); Poloshirt; Skepta (UK); Skrillex (USA)	Triple One (Triple J Unearthed; Sydney only); Reija Lee (Triple J Unearthed; Perth only); Eilish Gilligan (Triple J Unearthed; Melbourne only); Yu Yi (Triple J Unearthed; Brisbane only); CamelPhat (UK); Col3trane (UK); Confidence Man; Enschway; Fisher; Glades; Kllo; Petit Biscuit (FRA); Snakehips (UK)	(Sydney): Ariane; Flexmami; Godlands; Imbi the Girl; Made in Paris; Marlie; Milan Ring; Moonbase; Purple Sneakers DJ	(Perth): Flexmami; Godlands; Hyclass; Imbi the Girl; Made in Paris; Moonbase; WYN; Your Girl Pho	(Melbourne): Daws; Flexmami; Godlands; Imbi the Girl; Made in Paris; Mimi; Moonbase; Soju Gang	(Brisbane): Beatrice; Flexmami; Godlands; Imbi the Girl; Made in Paris; Moonbase

=== 2019 ===
2019
Atari	909	Juno
6Lack (USA); Denzel Curry (USA); Diplo (USA); Ebony Boadu; Flume; Miss Blanks; Schoolboy Q (USA); Triple One; Wafia	A.Girl (Triple J Unearthed winner; Sydney only); Hoodzy (Triple J Unearthed winner; Perth only); Jamo (Triple J Unearthed winner; Melbourne only); Nerve (Triple J Unearthed winner; Brisbane only); Cosmo's Midnight; Doja Cat (USA); Dom Dolla; Hannah Wants (UK); Jeffe; JPEGMafia (USA); Leikeli47 (USA); Malaa (FRA); Set Mo; Slowthai (UK)	Enschway (Sydney only); Twerl (Perth only); Whethan (USA) (Melbourne & Brisbane only); Biscits (UK); Coda Conduct; Flava D (UK); Kinder; Luude; Perto; Riton (UK); Young Franco

=== 2022 ===
Sources:

- 24kGoldn (USA)
- AJ Tracey (UK) (Note: AJ Tracey did not perform at the Perth show due to illness)
- Barkaa
- bbno$ (CAN)
- Blanke
- Bru-C (UK)
- Central Cee (UK)
- Chris Lake (UK)
- Culture Shock (UK)
- Dameeeela
- Dave Winnel
- Disclosure (UK)
- ~~Doechii (USA)~~ (Note: Doechii had to withdraw from the lineup at the last minute due to contracting COVID-19. As a result, bbno$ played an extended set in both Melbourne and Perth, JessB was added to the line-up for the same weekend, and she was replaced by Dave Winnel and Pania during the Sydney, Brisbane, and Adelaide shows.)
- Electric Fields
- James Hype (UK) (Note: James Hype did not perform at the Perth show due to illness)
- JID (USA)
- JessB (NZ) (Melbourne and Perth only)
- The Jungle Giants
- Kito (USA)
- Louis the Child (USA)
- LP Giobbi (USA)
- Meduza (ITA)
- Memphis LK
- Miiesha
- Nia Archives (UK)
- Pania
- Pirra
- ~~Polo G (USA)~~ (Note: Polo G withdrew from the lineup due to unspecified reasons. He was replaced by JID.)
- Pretty Girl
- Qrion (JPN/USA)
- Stace Cadet and KLP
- Roddy Ricch (USA)
- Tove Lo (SWE)
- Trippie Redd (USA)
- ~~Young Thug (USA)~~ (Note: Young Thug was removed from the line-up due to his arrest on gang-related charges. He was replaced by Roddy Ricch and Trippie Redd)

=== 2023 ===
Sources:

- 1tbsp
- ArrDee (UK)
- Ayebatonye
- Coi Leray (USA)
- Donatachi
- Flowidus
- Four Tet (UK)
- Friction (UK)
- Handsome
- Hannah Laing (UK)
- Ice Spice (USA)
- JBEE (UK)
- JPEGMafia (USA)
- Jyoty (UK)
- Kenny Beats (USA)
- Kobie Dee
- Lil Uzi Vert (USA)
- Mallrat
- Marc Rebillet (USA)
- ~~Metro Boomin (USA)~~ (Note: Metro Boomin withdrew from the line-up due to personal reasons and was replaced by Onefour.)
- Onefour
- Piri (UK)
- Skrillex (USA)
- Spinall (NGA)
- venbee (UK)
- Vv Pete
- Willo
- Wongo b2b Little Fritter
- Young Franco
- Yunè Pinku (UK)

=== 2024 ===
- 21 Savage (USA)
- AK Sports (UK)
- Ben Gerrans
- The Blessed Madonna (USA)
- Cassian (USA)
- Conducta (UK)
- Disco Lines (USA)
- Djanaba
- EarthGang (USA)
- ~~Flo Milli (USA)~~ (Note: Flo Milli withdrew from the lineup due to mental health reasons and was replaced by EarthGang)
- Folamour (FRA)
- Foura b2b Tom Santa
- Gold Fang (Brisbane and Sydney only)
- Jazzy (IRL)
- Jessie Reyez (CAN)
- John Summit (USA)
- Koven (UK)
- ~~Lil Tjay (USA)~~ (Note: Lil Tjay was removed from the lineup at the last minute due to undisclosed travel related reasons)
- Lithe
- A Little Sound (UK)
- Miss Kaninna
- Sampa the Great (ZAM)
- Skepta (UK)
- Soju Gang
- Sub Focus- Evolve (UK)
- ~~Teezo Touchdown (USA)~~ (Note: Teezo Touchdown withdrew from the lineup the day before the first Listen Out date due to undisclosed reasons. He was replaced by YNG Martyr)
- ~~Tyla (RSA)~~ (Note: Tyla withdrew from the lineup days out from the first Listen Out date due to a back injury, which also resulted in most of her other world tour dates being cancelled. She was replaced by Sampa the Great)
- YNG Martyr

== Footnotes ==
City	Venue	Years Held
Sydney	Brazilian Fields, Centennial Park	2013–Present
Melbourne	Observatory Precinct, Royal Botanic Gardens	2013–2014
Melbourne	Catani Gardens, St Kilda	2015–Present
Perth	Ozone Reserve	2013–2015
Perth	Western Parklands, HBF Arena Joondalup	2016–Present
Brisbane	Cultural Forecourt, Southbank	2013
Brisbane	The Avenues & Expo Place, Brisbane Showgrounds	2014–2015
Brisbane	The Sporting Fields, Victoria Park	2016–2018
Brisbane	Brisbane Showgrounds	2019–Present

== Controversies ==
Listen Out has had a history of drug related controversies. During the Melbourne leg of the inaugural Listen Out tour, police arrested 13 people in relation to drug related offences. Police were also able to seize $10,000 worth of cocaine, ecstasy and prescription drugs. At the Sydney leg of the same tour 94 were charged by police for drug related offences. The 2014 version of listen had 37 festival attendees arrested in Melbourne for drug offences. The Sydney leg of the 2015 tour had seven people were arrested due to drug supply, with one carrying over 100 MDMA pills. A further 114 revellers were charged with drug possession at the same show.

In the 2016 run of the Listen Out, during the Victorian leg of the tour a woman aged 27 died of a suspected drug overdose. As a result, the Victorian police allocated more resources to the event for following years including additional passive alert drug detection dogs tat the following year's tour. Perth's 2017 leg of the tour had nine people charged with drug related offences. The Melbourne leg had 38 people arrested on similar grounds. Sydney's leg also lead to the arrest of 116 people relating to drug offences.

In 2018 following the deaths of two teenagers at the Defqon.1 festival, the NSW government heightened police presence at festivals, as Listen Out was the next festival to occur in New South Wales after Defqon.1 media attention gravitated towards it. As a result of the increased police presence, 159 people were charged with drug offences and 5 charged with drug supply. 12 people were taken to hospital at the NSW festival and 7 of these were found to be drug related issues. At the Melbourne leg of the tour in the same year 30 were charged with drug possession and one charged with trafficking cocaine.

Following a successful drug checking trial at Groovin' the Moo earlier in 2018, the Australian Festival Association suggested to implement this at more festivals as a preventative measure to lessen deaths at music festivals, this was met with a "no tolerance policy" from New South Wales' premier Gladys Berejiklian. Fuzzy representatives replied that governments should be more open to pill testing in order to create safer festivals.
