= Caught in a Reverie =

Studio album by the Dreggs
- Released: 26 April 2024
- Length: 43:13
- Label: The Dreggs Music
- Producer: Paddy Macrae; Zane Harris; Alex Hendriksson; Tim Goodburn; Matt Corby

The Dreggs chronology
The Sea's Embrace (2018)	Caught in a Reverie (2024)	The Art of Uncommon Practice (2025)

Singles from Caught in a Reverie
- 1. "For Your Love" Released: 2 June 2023; 2. "Take a Little Time" Released: 29 September 2023; 3. "Places" Released: 14 February 2024; 4. "Peeps with the Goods" Released: 22 March 2024

Caught in a Reverie is the debut album by Australian indie duo the Dreggs consisting of Paddy Macrae and Zane Harris. The album was released on 26 April 2024, independently. The album was preceded by the release of four singles: "For Your Love", "Take a Little Time", "Places" and "Peeps with the Goods". To support Caught in a Reverie, the duo will embark on album launch parties throughout Queensland and Victoria and on an album tour throughout the UK/EU, and set to return for another tour throughout Australia and New Zealand.

At the AIR Awards of 2025, the album was nominated for Independent Album of the Year.

== Background ==
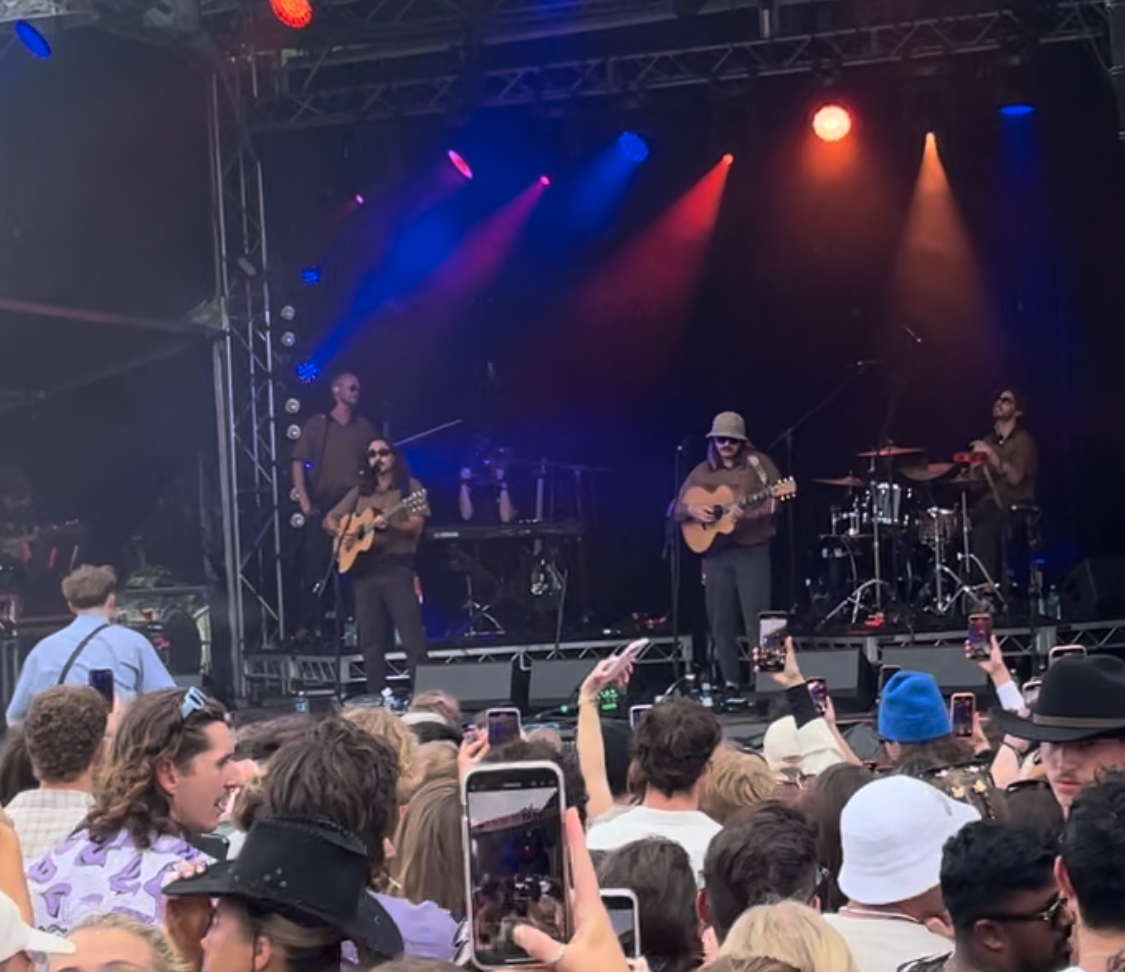
The Dreggs performing at Spilt Milk in Ballarat 2023

Caught in a Reverie was released independently by the duo, with all tracks co-written by Macrae and Harris. For years the duo had been releasing singles independently and had stated their plans to release their debut album on their socials throughout 2023. The duo released four singles "For Your Love", "Take a Little Time", "Places" and "Peeps with the Goods".

The duo announced the album and its release date on their socials on the 16 February 2024. This was followed up with the announcement of album launch parties throughout Queensland and Victoria in Australia, and a tour to support the album throughout the UK and Europe all in 2024. The duo will follow up their UK/EU tour with another tour throughout Australia and New Zealand.

In January the duo was announced as the first feature artist for Triple J Unearthed in 2024, after appearing at their first Triple J sponsored festival Spilt Milk in 2023. The duo was also set to make their debut at the Australian music festival Splendour in the Grass in 2024 on the main stage, but the festival was cancelled shortly after tickets went on sale, with Macrae stating "For everything to get cancelled in the blink of an eye, it's terrifying."

== Reception ==
Rolling Stone Australia described the opening track "Peeps with the Goods" as a standout song and that it "sets the tone for the rest of the luminous indie folk tracks." PerthNow writer Zach Margolius described the album as the soundtrack to "Sunshine Coast's laidback lifestyle". Lauren Katulka of Sounds of Oz found the album to be "a little darker" but that it maintains the duo's typical "positive place". She also found the album to be "hopeful". Tracey Moyle of Good Call Live remarked that the single "Places" has an "upbeat sing-along feeling that epitomises The Dreggs" and that this album was "truly worth the wait".

== Track listing ==
All tracks are written by Paddy Macrae and Zane Harris, except where noted.

Caught in a Reverie track listing
No.	Title	Writer(s)	Length
1.	"Peeps with the Goods"	Paddy Macrae; Zane Harris; Matt Corby; Alex Henriksson	2:42
2.	"Train Left the Station"		4:15
3.	"Places"		4:17
4.	"Look to the Stars"		4:11
5.	"I'm a Little Older"		2:46
6.	"For Your Love"		4:12
7.	"Sad Old Song"		4:30
8.	"Come So Far" (featuring Brook St)		3:11
9.	"Berlin"	Macrae; Harris; Henriksson	3:47
10.	"She Picks Flowers"		2:28
11.	"All My Friends"		3:15
12.	"Take a Little Time"		3:39
Total length:			43:13

== Personnel ==
All credits taken from physical Caught In A Reverie Vinyl

Musicians

- Paddy Macrae – lead vocals, guitar, piano, banjo, bass
- Zane Harris – backing vocals, guitar, percussion
- Jack Campbell – drums/percussion (tracks 3, 11)
- Jarith Hughes – drums (tracks 2, 10, 12)
- Jason Daniels and Hannah Olivia of Brook St - featuring artist (track 8)

Technical

- Alex Henriksson – recording, production (tracks 2, 5, 6, 8, 9, 10, 12)
- Matt Neighbour – mixing (tracks 2, 5, 6, 8, 9, 10, 12)
- Tim Goodburn – recording, production, mixing (tracks 3, 4, 7, 9, 11)
- Paddy Macrae – recording, production (track 4)
- Matt Corby – production, mixing (track 1)
- Paul Blakey (12th & Vine Post) – mastering (all tracks)
- Jack Tierney (Listen to the Graphic) - artwork
- Recorded at Pease Media Studio, Rainbow Valley Records and Bignote Productions

== Charts ==
Chart performance for Caught in a Reverie
Chart (2024)	Peak position
Australian Albums (ARIA)	29
