= Nyxen =

Australian singer, songwriter and musician

- Origin: Sydney
- Genres: Synth Pop; Electronica; Dance
- Instruments: Guitar; Vocals; Keyboard; Violin; Digital audio workstation
- Years active: 2016–present
- Labels: Unknown Records
- Website: http://nyxenmusic.com.au/

Chelsea Lester, known by her stage name Nyxen, is an Australian singer-songwriter, musician, DJ, and music producer. She was born in Tokyo. Nyxen has performed at a range of Australian music festivals including Listen Out, Field Day, Yours and Owls, and Splendour in the Grass. She supported Australian deep house producer Golden Features on his national tour. Nyxen received high rotation for her songs "In The City" and "Chains" on Australian radio station triple j.

== Discography ==
=== Extended plays ===
- You (2016)

=== Singles ===
- "Running" (2017)
- "Monster" (2017)
- "Is It Love" (2017)
- "In The City" (2017)
- "Chains" (2018)
- "The Monologue" Featuring Coda Conduct (2019)
- "Insomnia" (2019)
- "Red P-Plates" (2019)
- "Nightmare" (2020)
- "Tunnels" (2021)
- "PXNK" (2022)
- "Silence in Motion" (2022)

=== Albums ===
- PXNK (2022)
