= I Want to Live with You =

I Want to Live with You may refer to:

- "I Want to Live with You", a song by Tina Arena from her 1997 album In Deep
- "I Want to Live with You", a song by Alex Lahey from her 2019 album The Best of Luck Club
