= Parklife Festival =

Parklife is the name of two major music festivals:

- Parklife Music Festival, a former annual Australian music festival held from 2000 to 2013
- Parklife (festival), an annual music festival held in Manchester, United Kingdom
