= Middle Palms =

Australian indie rock band

- Origin: Nipaluna/Hobart, Tasmania, Australia
- Genres: Indie pop, rock, reggae
- Years active: c. 2019–present
- Label: Independent
- Members: Sam Sherlock; Floyd Taylor; Charlie Wilkinson; Callum Waller

Middle Palms is an Australian indie pop rock band from Hobart, consisting of Sam Sherlock (vocals), Floyd Taylor (guitar), Charlie Wilkinson (bass) and Callum Waller (drums).

Middle Palms formed while in high school and blend smooth vocals and catchy guitar riffs with reggae-influenced grooves. Their sound is influenced by artists such as Coldplay, The Whitlams, and Ocean Alley. They have built a growing fanbase through regular performances in Tasmanian venues and private party bookings. Their debut EP, Runaway Girl, was released on 21 December 2024.

== Career ==
The band gained initial recognition through Triple J Unearthed, receiving national radio play in April 2024. They released the singles "Talk Too Much" and "Fingers" in 2024.

The band regularly performed at various venues across Tasmania and quickly gained demand for private party bookings. Their debut EP was anticipated for release in 2024, showcasing their evolving sound that fuses indie pop rock with reggae elements.

=== 2025 ===
In January 2025, Middle Palms won Triple J Unearthed's competition to perform at Party in the Paddock. They appeared on the main stage in February 2025 alongside Empire of the Sun and The Kooks at the festival which saw 13,000 people attend.

Throughout the year they opened for The Moving Stills, and released their third single Slow Down.

They finished off 2025 performing at Great Escape Music Festival alongside Lime Cordiale, Spacey Jane, Hockey Dad, San Cisco, and local acts PowderKeg and Glass Media.

== Discography ==
=== Extended plays ===
Title	Details
Runaway Girl	Released: 21 December 2024; Label: Independent

=== Singles ===
Title	Released
Talk Too Much	Released: 4 January 2024; Label: Independent
Fingers	Released: 1 May 2024; Label: Independent
Slow Down	Released: 17 May 2025; Label: Independent
High	Released: 31 July 2026; Label: Independent
