= PARIS (Australian musician) =

Australian musician

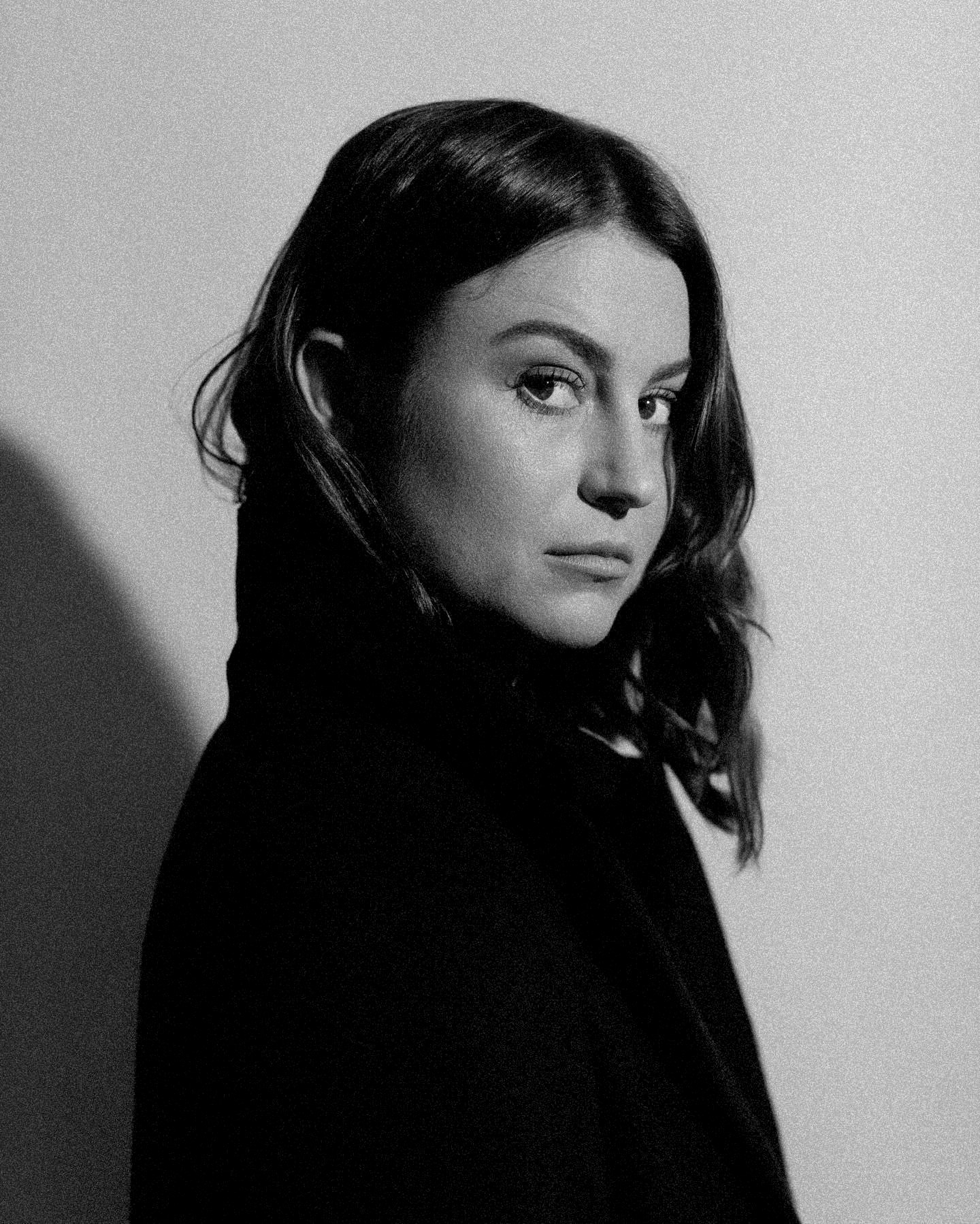

Background information
- Birth name: Paris Forscutt
- Origin: Sydney, Australia
- Genres: Techno
- Instrument(s): DJ, Music Producer
- Years active: 2012–present
- Labels: Of Leisure, Upon Access

Paris Forscutt, known by her stage name PARIS, and formerly Made in Paris, is an Australian musician, DJ, and music producer.

== Career ==
Paris Forscutt was born in Pambula, New South Wales, and began producing music in 2012. Her first single The Taker was released on the Birmingham based record label Bloc Beatz Records in 2013. After releasing several EPs and one album as Made in Paris, in June 2022 she announced her stage name would now be PARIS.

After her music gained popularity, Paris moved to Sydney where she is now based, and where she runs her record label Upon Access.

She has performed at many Australian and international music festivals and venues. These have included Lost Paradise, Beyond The Valley, The Grass is Greener, Listen Out, and Splendour in the Grass.

== Discography ==
=== Albums ===
- EXORDIUM (2021)

=== EPs ===
- Gravity (2020)
- Switch (2013)
- Your Body (2014)
- You're Wrong (2016)
- Canopies (2017)

=== Singles ===
- "The Taker" (2013)
- "Switch" (2013)
- "Your Body" (2014)
- "You're Wrong" (2016)
- "Canopies" (2017)
- "Sonorous" (2017)
- "Lost Perception (2017)
- "Mass Movement" (2017)
- "Erratic" (2018)
- "Burial" (2018)
- "Reconnect" (2018)
- "Captive / River Of India (2018)
- "Glad i Met You" (2020)
- "Azibo" (2020)
- "Pursuit" (2019)

=== Remixes ===
- "Phycho Game"- PTN (2013)
- "Konsti"- FEDECKX (2014)
- "Fallen"- LO'99, Marshall F (2017)
- "Fat Dolphins"- Faximile (2017)
- "Day Spa"- Eduardo Muchacho (2018)
- "Faces Of Meth"- Nick Coleman (2019)
- "Windowscene"- Luttrell (2019)
- "Another Life"- Rufus Du Sol (2019)
