= The Buoys (Australian band) =

Australian punk band

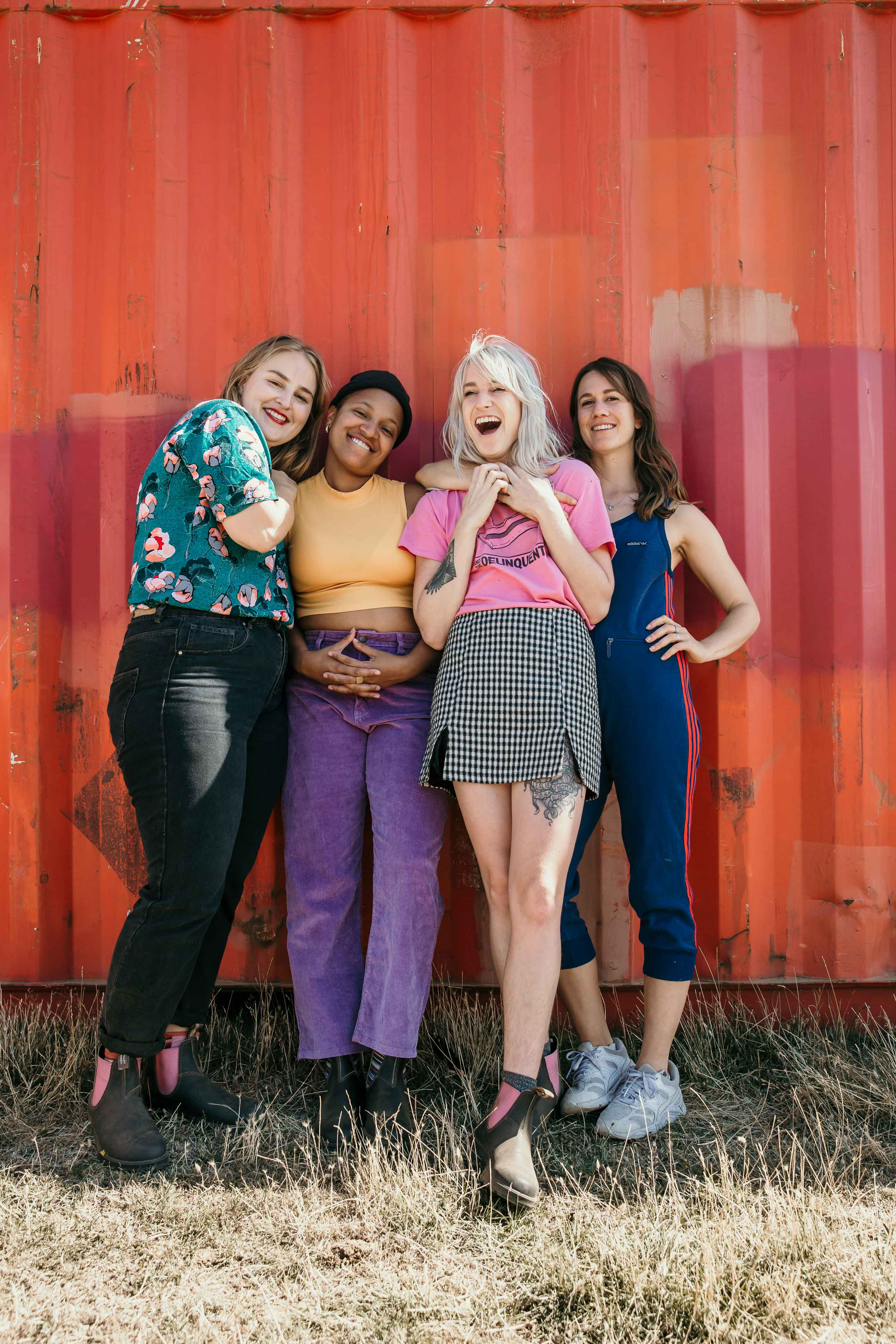
- L to R: Hilary Geddes, Courtney Cunningham, Zoe Catterall, Tess Wilkin; Party In The Paddock, Launceston, February 2020

Background information
- Origin: Sydney, New South Wales, Australia
- Genre: Alternative rock
- Years active: 2016–present
- Spinoffs: Dead Witch, Green Screen, Mega Fäuna, Hilary Geddes Quartet
- Members: Zoe Catterall; Tess Wilkin; Courtney Cunningham; Hilary Geddes
- Past members: Anthea Compton; Roslyn Helper; Sophie Moroney; Ellie Moroney; Emily Jane
- Website: www.thebuoysband.com

The Buoys are an Australian alternative rock band formed in 2016. Since May 2019, the line-up has been Courtney Cunningham on bass guitar, Hilary Geddes on lead guitar, Tess Wilkin on drums, and Zoe Catterall, the band's founding mainstay, on rhythm guitar and lead vocals. The Buoys released their debut studio album Lustre in 2024, and have released three extended plays, Soft Boy (2017), All This Talking Gets Us Nowhere (2020) and Unsolicited Advice for Your DIY Disaster (2021), as well as several singles. They have toured both nationally and internationally with the likes of Hoodoo Gurus, IDLES, The Dandy Warhols, Arctic Monkeys and more.

== History ==
The Buoys were formed in 2016, initially as a three-piece, by Zoe Catterall on rhythm guitar and lead vocals, Sophie Moroney on drums and Emily Jane on bass guitar hoping for more female musicians in their hometown, Cronulla, New South Wales. They played their first show with Ruby Fields (f.k.a. Stay at Home Mum). Their five-track debut extended play, Soft Boy, appeared in November 2017. It was described by Dave McCarthy of Laundry Echo as a "furious debut five track from our new favourite queens of four to the floor punk songs."

McCarthy felt their debut single, "Liar Liar", displayed "an unrelenting onslaught of fuzzy guitars and bouncing drums that build a platform for nonchalant vocals to sound fed-up and fierce in equal measure upon." Come Here Floyd staff writer observed, "a fast paced dictation for love's complications and weird underpinnings. The ladies in the 3 piece band calmly fixates the right calculations towards why the complexity between one and his/her significant other. It's a challenge for sure."

During 2017 Emily Jane was replaced by Elle Moroney on bass guitar, who was replaced in turn by Roslyn Helper in 2018 and then by Courtney Cunningham later that year. Anthea Compton joined on lead guitar during 2018 and Tess Wilkin replaced Sophie Moroney on drums. The Buoys released a single, "Blues Point Road", in May 2018, which Catterall described as about "being left completely in the dark about someone’s intentions." Their following singles, "Arm Wrestle" (August) and "Make It Clear" (October) were stand-alone singles.

The Buoys had intended to release a second EP, Split Lip, but had a change of musical direction. The group released two singles in 2019, "Inside Outside" (April) and "Gold" (July). The line-up of Catterall, Cunningham, and Wilkin were joined by Hilary Geddes on lead guitar in May 2019. During that year the Buoys embarked on their first national tour, supporting DZ Deathrays, Polish Club and VOIID, before setting off on the 2019/2020 Australian festival circuit, playing at the likes of Fairgrounds, Farmer and the Owl and Festival of the Sun.

In February 2020, the Buoys played at the last-ever Party in the Paddock festival. They performed as support to Violent Soho at the Lansdowne Hotel. They were described by NME's David James Young as "a band that has been asserting themselves as one of Sydney's great indie-rock hopes." The group were signed to Spunk! Records and issued their seventh single, "Wah", in April. Young observed, "[it] is one of the shortest and fastest songs the band has ever released – a throwback to mid-90s riot-grrrl and 80s punk." Hayden Davies of Pilerats felt the song was "a perfect example of their brilliance and the exact type of work they're putting out to ensure their space in tomorrow's music world."

The band released their second EP, All This Talking Gets Us Nowhere, in July 2020. They launched it with two sold-out shows at the Lansdowne Hotel in August 2020. They followed with a third EP, Unsolicited Advice for Your DIY Disaster, in October 2021. Chanel Issa of Hysteria Magazine highlighted the tracks, "Car Park", "Lie to Me Again" and "Drive Me Home" as stand-outs. During March and April 2023 the Buoys and Eliza & The Delusionals co-headlined an Australian east coast tour. In that year the Buoys playing "I Want You" was used in an ad for Fox League's coverage of NRLW.

Band members announced in May 2024 that their debut album, Lustre, was due to be released in July. Simultaneously they issued another single, "Check Mate", which is a collaboration with alternative rocker, Alex Lahey. Lustre, which includes previously released singles, was recorded with Chris Collins in Northern Rivers, New South Wales.

== Band members ==
Current members

- Zoe Catterall – lead vocals, rhythm guitar (2016–present), lead guitar (2016–2018)
- Tess Wilkin – drums, percussion, backing vocals (2018–present)
- Courtney Cunningham – bass guitar, backing vocals (2018–present)
- Hilary Geddes – lead guitar, backing vocals (2019–present)

Past members

- Emily Jane – bass guitar, backing vocals (2016–2017)
- Sophie Moroney – drums, percussion (2016–2018)
- Ellie Moroney – bass guitar, backing vocals (2017–2018)
- Anthea Compton – lead guitar, backing vocals (2018–2019)
- Roslyn Helper – bass guitar, backing vocals (2018)

Timeline

== Discography ==
=== Albums ===
Title	Album details	Peak chart positions
Title	Album details	AUS
Lustre	Released: 12 July 2024; Label: Sony Music Australia / Arcadia; Formats: LP, digital download, streaming	78
Concrete Cowboy	Released: 23 October 2026; Label: Sony Music Australia; Formats: Digital download, streaming, CD	31

=== Extended plays ===
Title	EP details
Soft Boy	Released: 15 November 2017; Label: Self-released; Formats: Digital download, streaming
All This Talking Gets Us Nowhere	Released: 10 July 2020; Label: Spunk; Formats: Digital download, streaming, 12" vinyl
Unsolicited Advice for Your DIY Disaster	Released: 13 October 2021; Label: Spunk; Formats: Digital download, streaming, 12" vinyl

== Awards and nominations ==
=== APRA Awards ===
The APRA Awards are held in Australia and New Zealand by the Australasian Performing Right Association to recognise songwriting skills, sales, and airplay performance by its members annually.

Year	Nominee / work	Award	Result	Ref.
2024	"I Want You"	Most Performed Rock Work	Nominated	

=== J Awards ===
The J Awards are an annual series of Australian music awards that were established by the Australian Broadcasting Corporation's youth-focused radio station Triple J. They commenced in 2005.

Year	Nominee / work	Award	Result	Ref.
2024	Lustre	Australian Album of the Year	Nominated	

=== Rolling Stone Australia Awards ===
The Rolling Stone Australia Awards are awarded annually in January or February by the Australian edition of Rolling Stone magazine for outstanding contributions to popular culture in the previous year.

Year	Nominee / work	Award	Result	Ref.
2025	The Buoys	Best New Artist	Shortlisted	
