= Coda Conduct =

Australian hip hop duo

- Origin: Canberra, Australia
- Genres: Australian hip hop
- Label: Elefant Traks
- Members: Sally Coleman; Erica Mallett

Coda Conduct were an Australian hip hop duo consisting of Sally Coleman (born 1992) and Erica Mallett (born 1993). In addition to performing as Coda Conduct, the two are known as Sally & Erica, who presented the breakfast show program on national radio station Triple J from January 2020 to November 2020. Soon after, the band announced on Instagram that they had broken up.

== Early lives and career ==
Both members of Coda Conduct grew up in southern Canberra – Coleman in Garran, and Mallett in Hughes – but they met while travelling in India in 2012. They bonded over a love of hip hop, and formed Coda Conduct a few months after returning to Australia. In 2015 they released their first EP Butter Side Up. Coda Conduct have since released several popular singles including “Usually I’m Cool”, “Love For Me” and "The Monologue", featuring Nyxen. On stage, they have supported the likes of Thundamentals, Horrorshow and Tkay Maidza, and performed at Groovin' the Moo, Listen Out and Spilt Milk.

As radio presenters, Coleman and Mallett hosted a weekly hip hop show called What’s Good on Sydney's FBi Radio from 2015 to 2017. In 2018, Sally & Erica began to host Weekend Arvos on Triple J. They also regularly filled in as guest presenters for the Weekday Breakfast and Drive shows. On 22 October 2019, it was announced the duo would present triple j's Breakfast in 2020, replacing Ben Harvey and Liam Stapleton. On 17 November 2020, they announced that they would be leaving Triple J to pursue alternative careers.

== Discography ==
=== Extended plays ===
List of EPs, with release date and label shown
Title	EP details
Butter Side Up	Released: 2015; Label: Formats: Digital download, streaming, CD
Other People's Problems	Released: 2019; Label: Formats: Digital download, streaming

=== Singles ===
List of singles, with year released and album name shown
Title	Year	Album
"Paint It Gold"	2015	Butter Side Up
"Click Clack (Front N Back)"	2016	Non-album singles
"Usually I'm Cool"	2016	Non-album singles
"Love For Me"	2018	Non-album singles
"The Monologue" (featuring Nyxen)	2019	Other People's Problems
"Leaving Home"	2019	Other People's Problems
"Animal Kingdom"	2019	Other People's Problems
"Lying to Myself" (featuring Kinder)	2019	Other People's Problems
