= I Love You Like a Brother =

Studio album by Alex Lahey
- Released: 6 October 2017
- Length: 35:52
- Labels: Alex Lahey, Nicky Boy Records
- Producer: Oscar Dawson

Alex Lahey chronology
B-Grade University (2016)	I Love You Like a Brother (2017)	The Best of Luck Club (2019)

Singles from I Love You Like a Brother
- 1. "Every Day's the Weekend" Released: 28 July 2017; 2. "Lotto in Reverse" Released: 30 August 2017; 3. "I Haven't Been Taking Care of Myself" Released: 15 September 2017; 4. "There's No Money" Released: 17 November 2017; 5. "I Love You Like a Brother" Released: 18 March 2018

Professional ratings
Aggregate scores
Source	Rating
Album of the Year	80/100
AnyDecentMusic?	7.8/10
Metacritic	80/100
Review scores
Source	Rating
DIY	4/5 stars
The Music	4.5/5 stars
NME	4/5 stars
No Ripcord	8/10 stars
Pitchfork	7.6/10
PopMatters	8/10
SoundBlab	7/10
Spectrum Culture	4/5 stars
The Sydney Morning Herald	4/5 stars
Under the Radar	8/10

I Love You Like a Brother is the debut studio album by Australian singer-songwriter Alex Lahey. It was released on 6 October 2017 and peaked at number 15 on the ARIA Charts.

At the J Awards of 2017, the album was nominated for Australian Album of the Year.

At the ARIA Music Awards of 2018, the album was nominated for Breakthrough Artist – Release.

== Track listing ==
All tracks are written by Alex Lahey; "Awkward Exchange" co-written with Sam Telford and Sam Scott.

No.	Title	Length
1.	"Every Day's the Weekend"	3:10
2.	"I Love You Like a Brother"	2:50
3.	"Perth Traumatic Stress Disorder"	2:15
4.	"I Haven't Been Taking Care of Myself"	3:46
5.	"Backpack"	3:59
6.	"Awkward Exchange"	3:51
7.	"I Want U"	3:48
8.	"Lotto in Reverse"	4:00
9.	"Let's Call It a Day"	4:19
10.	"There's No Money"	3:54

== Personnel ==
Musicians

- Alex Lahey – vocals, guitar, keys, alto saxophone, bass guitar, marimba, tubular bells, glockenspiel, xylophone, programming, timpani, vibraphone
- Samuel Humphrey – guitar
- Jonathan Skourletos – bass guitar
- Oscar Dawson – guitar, keys, percussion, background vocals, producer, engineer
- Ali Barter – background vocals
- Bec Sandridge – background vocals
- Oliver Whitehead – tenor saxophone
- Darcie Foley – trombone
- Liam McGorry – trumpet

Additional personnel

- Aaron Dobos – engineer
- Matt Redlich – mastering
- Giulia Giannini McGauran – front cover image
- Felicity Case-Mejia – cover design

== Charts ==
Chart (2017)	Peak position
Australian Albums (ARIA)	15
