= Kira Puru =

Australian musician

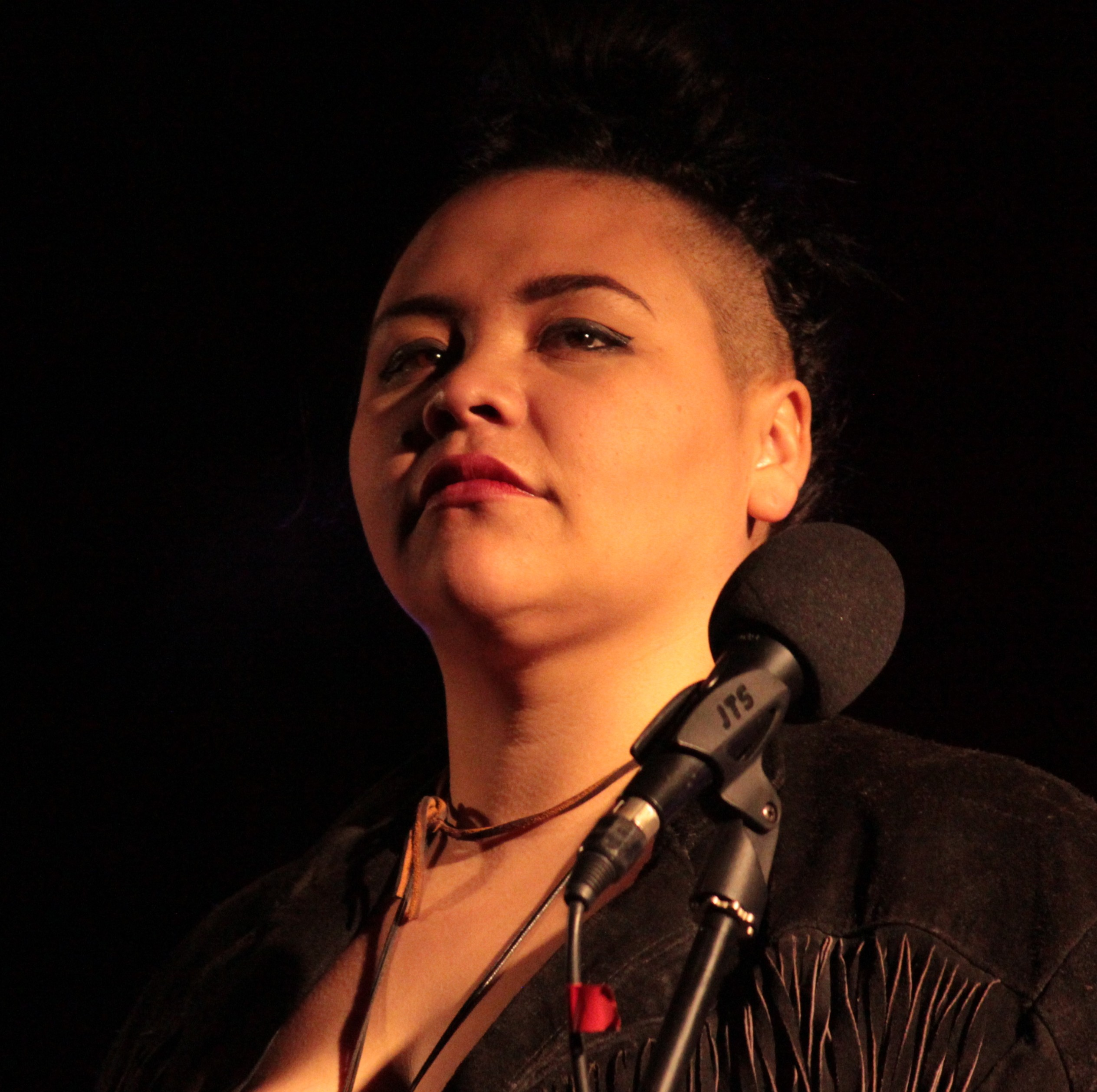
- Puru in 2013

Background information
- Origin: Cardiff, New South Wales, Australia
- Genres: Disco, pop
- Years active: 2013–present
- Labels: Sony Music Australia, New Tribe Music

Kira Puru is a gender-fluid Australian musician. She is of Maori descent, her father being from the Tainui tribe, and grew up in Cardiff, New South Wales, near Newcastle. Puru has been described as "Señorita, swagger and a troublemaker" by Triple J whose self-titled EP was released in 2018 by New Tribe Music, a joint venture record label with Sony Music Australia. i-D Magazine called Puru "a charismatic stage persona" and she has performed at festivals and events including: Splendour in the Grass, Spilt Milk, Listen Out, and Groovin' the Moo.

== Career ==
In 2012, Puru voiced Lonely Child, the opening credit theme to ABC and Blakfella Films' award-winning drama series, Redfern Now.

In 2013, Puru moved to Melbourne, Australia, to launch her career as a solo artist after a string of collaborations with Paul Mac, Illy, Paul Kelly, and Urthboy.

Puru released the single "Tension" in 2017 then followed on with "Molotov" which The Guardian said is a "Slinky, attitude-laden song" and was ranked 75th on the Triple J Hottest 100, 2018. In 2018, Puru toured nationally with Listen Out, and in support of Vera Blue and The Rubens.

She has recorded on the Sony label.

In 2019, she toured nationally as the supporting act for Peking Duk and in May, Puru went on a national tour for her single "Everything's Better Without You" with Kinder as support. The video for her new single "Why Don't We Get Along" was launched by Clash magazine which they described as "Perfect Pop" also produced by long term collaborator Jon Hume (Sofi Tukker).

In 2020 Puru toured with UK artist Yungblud for his Falls Festival side shows where she was compared to US artist Lizzo. She called out radio for not playing enough Australian Music and Triple J were one of the first to take up her challenge. In April 2020, Puru released her single "Idiot" with a "hook that’s an effortless ear worm". Junkee Media said "Kira Puru's Tiktok account is fantastic" including luring Tones and I and a bunch of other musicians to imitate the heavy metal band Korn.

In 2022, in celebration of their release, Talk With Me, produced by Keli Holiday and mixed by Dave Hammer, Puru launched a Cidre/Gewurztraminer wine in collaboration with South Australian wine makers, VHS Wines and Guilty Pleasures.

Alongside music, Puru has a career as a creative director and photographer. In 2025, she received an ARIA Award nomination in the category of Best Cover Art, for her work on Thelma Plum's 2024 album I'm Sorry, Now Say It Back.

In 2026, Puru launched an acting career, playing Flora in Season 2 of Amazon's Deadloch, and Kat in ABC's Bad Company, written by Anne Edmonds.

== Personal life ==
Puru uses she/they pronouns.

== Discography ==
=== Extended plays ===
Title	Details
Kira Puru	Released: 21 September 2018; Label: Kira Puru, Sony Music; Format: CD streaming, digital download

=== Singles ===
==== As lead artist ====
Year	Title	Album
2015	"All Dulled Out"	non album single
2017	"Three Dots" (with Yeo)	non album single
2017	"Tension"	Kira Puru EP
2018	"Molotov"	Kira Puru EP
2018	"Fly"	Kira Puru EP
2019	"Everything's Better Without You"	non album single
2019	"Why Don't We Get Along"	non album single
2020	"Idiot"	non album single
2022	"Talk with Me"	TBA
2023	"All My Boyfriends"	TBA

==== As featured artist ====
List of singles as featured artist, showing year released, and album name
Title	Year	Album
"Talk" (Illy featuring Kira Puru)	2013	Cinematic
"State of War" (Paul Mac featuring Kira Puru & Goodwill)	2015	Holiday From Me
"Daughter of the Light" (Urthboy featuring Kira Puru)	2016	The Past Beats Inside Me Like a Second Heartbeat

== Awards and nominations ==
=== National Live Music Awards ===
The National Live Music Awards (NLMAs) are a broad recognition of Australia's diverse live industry, celebrating the success of the Australian live scene. The awards commenced in 2016.

Year	Nominee / work	Award	Result
2018	Kira Puru	Live Voice of the Year	Nominated
2018	Kira Puru	Live R&B or Soul Act of the Year	Nominated
2018	Kira Puru	Best Live Voice of the Year - People's Choice	Nominated
2020	Kira Puru	Victorian Live Act of the Year	Nominated

=== ARIA Music Awards ===
The ARIA Music Awards is an annual awards ceremony across all genres of Australian music. Kira Puru has received one nomination.

Year	Nominee / work	Award	Result
2025	I'm Sorry, Now Say It Back	Best Cover Art	Nominated
