= Choomba =

Australian electronic music duo

- Origin: Perth, Western Australia
- Genres: Tech house; bass
- Occupation: Record producers
- Instrument: Digital audio workstation
- Years active: 2019–present
- Labels: Spinnin'; EMI Music Australia
- Members: Christian Benson; Tim Benson
- Website: www.linktree/choombamusic

Choomba is an Australian electronic dance music duo consisting of cousins, record producer Christian Benson and Timothy Benson. The project formed in 2019. They received full rotation on Triple J with their song "La Luh". The pair have played Wildlands Festival, Spilt Milk and The Grass Is Greener. They hosted the electronic music program The Nudge on Triple J from August 2021 until their departure in March 2022.

== Career ==
Choomba first started in Amsterdam. Christian picked up drums at high school before moving to Perth where an Avicii video on YouTube inspired him to try producing.

On 11 March 2022, the duo announced their departure from Triple J after six months on air, citing a significant international tour schedule which they stated would "limit their ability to present the show to its full potential and capacity."

=== Luude's "Down Under" remix success ===
In 2021, Luude remixed Men at Work's "Down Under" as a drum and bass track, which became popular song online. Men at Work's lead singer Colin Hay re-recorded the vocal for the track's official release on the Sweat It Out record label with the track, now credited to Luude featuring Colin Hay, charting at number 32 on the UK Singles chart on 7 January 2022 and at number 48 in Australia.

== Musical style and influences ==
Choomba's musical style consists of tech house and bass.

== Discography ==
=== Extended plays ===
List of EPs, with release date, selected chart positions, and label shown
Title	EP details
Choomdooskins	Released: 2019; Label: Choomba (independent); Format: Digital download, streaming

=== Singles ===
==== As lead artist ====
List of singles, with year released, selected chart positions, and album name shown
Title	Year	Peak chart positions	Album
Title	Year	AUS Club	Album
"Wantchu"	2019	—	Non-album singles
"La Luh"	2020	42	Non-album singles
"Say It" (feat. LP Giobbi & Blush'ko)	2021	—	Non-album singles
"White Mercedes"	2021	—	Non-album singles
