= Alex Lahey =

Australian musician

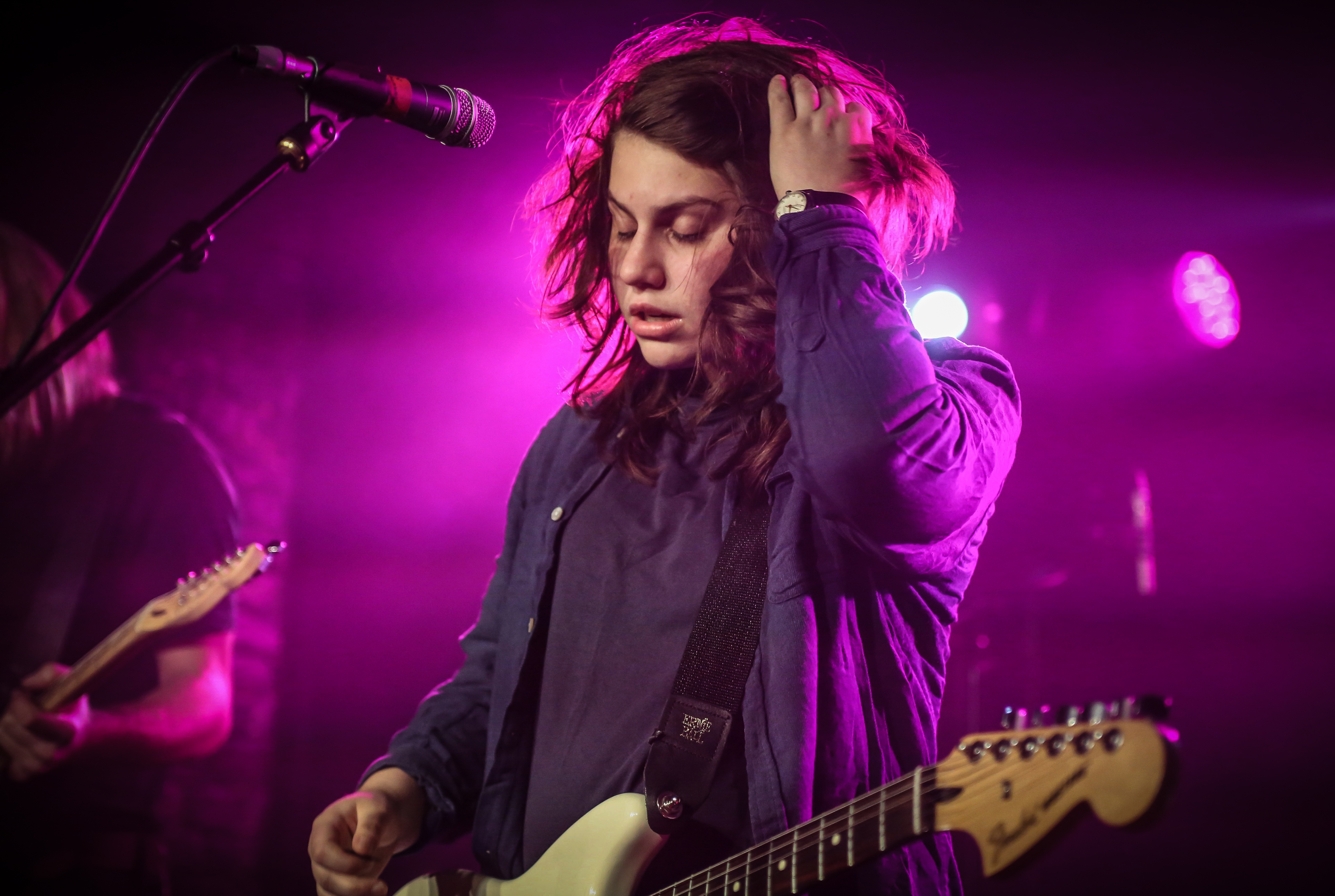
- Lahey performing at Omeara, London

Background information
- Born: Alexandra Lahey; July 30, 1992 (age 34); Melbourne, Victoria, Australia
- Genres: Alternative; indie; rock; pop
- Occupation: Musician
- Instruments: Vocals; guitar; saxophone; keyboards
- Years active: 2011–present
- Labels: Nicky Boy Records; Dead Oceans; Liberation Music
- Website: alexlahey.com.au

Alexandra Lahey (/ˈleɪhi/ LAY-hee) is an Australian alternative rock singer-songwriter and multi-instrumentalist. She has released three full-length albums: I Love You Like a Brother (2017), The Best of Luck Club (2019) and The Answer Is Always Yes (2023).

In addition to her solo work, Lahey has a reputation as a sought-after collaborator, and has co-written and produced for artists including Maggie Lindemann, Teen Jesus and the Jean Teasers, Christian Lee Hutson, The Buoys, Gordi and more.

== Early life ==
Alex Lahey was born and grew up in Albert Park, a suburb of Melbourne, where she lived with her parents and younger brother, Will. At 13 years old, she started taking saxophone lessons while teaching herself guitar. Following high school, she started university courses in both music and arts but dropped out of the music component to join local group, Animaux, on vocals and saxophone. In 2014, her question asking from how high a steak would need to be dropped to be cooked by the heat of atmospheric re-entry appeared in Randall Munroe's book What If?. After completing her arts degree Lahey decided to start a solo music career.

== Career ==
=== 2016–2018: B-Grade University and I Love You Like A Brother ===
Lahey's song "You Don't Think You Like People Like Me" received Pitchfork's Best New Track Award, and it was voted into the Triple J Hottest 100 of 2016 at No. 97. Lahey subsequently won a Triple J Unearthed prize, leading to a performance slot at Splendour in the Grass and a nomination for a J Award as Unearthed Artist of the Year.

In June 2016, Lahey won the Josh Pyke Partnership, for unsigned artists, which is co-sponsored by Pyke, Australasian Performing Right Association (APRA) and Australasian Mechanical Copyright Owners Society (AMCOS). She received a AUD$7500 grant, a song writing mentorship from Pyke and introduction to music industry officials. Lahey won the prize ahead of 200 entries and Pyke explained, "the song she submitted was immediately stuck in my head, and her lyrics were compelling and clever. Her turn of phrase was quirky and intelligent, and really relatable... I reckon most of us have been in the situation that's portrayed in the song 'You Don’t Think You Like People Like Me'."

Lahey's debut extended play (EP), B-Grade University, was released on 29 July 2016, via Caroline Australia Records with distribution by Universal Music Australia. It reached No. 95 on the ARIA Top 100 Physical Albums and No. 8 on the ARIA Hitseekers Albums charts.

In January 2017 Lahey signed to Dead Oceans, which re-released her EP. On 6 October 2017 she issued her debut album, I Love You Like a Brother, through her own independent label, Nicky Boy Records/Dead Oceans via Caroline Australia/Universal Music Australia. Laura Stanley of Under the Radar observed, "[she] shares scenes from her own period of self-discovery, which makes for a fierce and incredibly fun debut full-length... the record standouts happen when Lahey and her bandmates zoom through spells of heartache with candidness and in a sharp pop-punk style."

I Love You Like a Brother was placed on several albums-of-the-year lists, including Bandcamp Daily (at No. 40), Noisey, the Sydney Morning Herald, Under the Radar, BrooklynVegan, and redbull.com. Spin Magazine would also cite the album as one of the magazine's 13 "Favorite Overlooked Albums of 2017". After touring Australia through October 2017, Lahey undertook an international tour of US and Europe from December 2017 and April 2018. At the ARIA Music Awards of 2018 she was nominated for Breakthrough Artist – Release.

=== 2019–present: The Best of Luck Club and The Answer Is Always Yes ===
In May 2019, Lahey released her second album The Best of Luck Club. The album was produced by Catherine Marks along with Lahey. Lahey spent all of 2019 touring Australia, North America, Europe and the UK and had extensive touring plans for 2020 before they were cancelled due to the COVID-19 pandemic. The song "Misery Guts" from the album was featured in the video game Tony Hawk's Pro Skater 1+2.

In 2020, Lahey wrote and recorded the original song "On My Way" for Sony Pictures Animation's The Mitchells vs. the Machines, now Netflix’s biggest original animated release of all time. The song was also released on the official film soundtrack via Sony Classical.

On 21 October 2021, Lahey revealed she had signed with Liberation Records and released "Spike the Punch".

On 31 August 2022, Lahey released a single, "Congratulations", and announced a national tour, her first since 2019, beginning in October 2022. Her third studio album, The Answer Is Always Yes, was released on 19 May 2023.

In February 2026, Lahey launched a podcast called AL, Kate & All Their Mates with former AFLW player Kate McCarthy.

Lahey celebrated the 10th anniversary of debut EP B-Grade University, expanding the original release with new re-recordings.

== Personal life ==
Lahey is gay. Her partner is fellow Australian musician Gordi. The two released a collaboration, "Dino's", in early 2021.

Lahey is an avid supporter of the St Kilda Football Club and performed at the club's 150th anniversary game at the MCG in 2023.

== Discography ==
=== Studio albums ===
| Title | Album details | Peak chart positions | |
| Title | Album details | AUS | UK Rock |
|---|---|---|---|
| I Love You Like a Brother | Released: 6 October 2017; Label: Nicky Boy Records/Dead Oceans (NBR001/DOC136); Format: CD, LP, digital download, streaming | 15 | — |
| The Best of Luck Club | Released: 17 May 2019; Label: Nicky Boy Records/Dead Oceans (NBR002/DOC196); Format: CD, LP, digital download, streaming | 30 | 35 |
| The Answer Is Always Yes | Released: 19 May 2023; Label: Liberation, Mushroom; Format: LP, digital download, streaming | 55 | — |
"—" denotes a recording that did not chart or was not released in that territory.

=== Extended plays ===
List of EPs, with release date and label shown
| Title | EP details |
|---|---|
| B-Grade University | Released: 29 July 2016; Label: Caroline Music Australia/Dead Oceans (AL001CD/DOC134); Re-released: 17 July 2026; Format: CD, LP, Digital download |
| Between the Kitchen and the Living Room | Released: 29 May 2020; Label: Caroline Music Australia/Dead Oceans; Formats: Digital download, streaming |

=== Singles ===
==== As lead artist ====
| Title | Year | Certification | Album |
|---|---|---|---|
| "Air Mail" | 2015 | | Non-album single |
| "You Don't Think You Like People Like Me" | 2016 | | B-Grade University |
| "Let's Go Out" | 2016 | | B-Grade University |
| "Ivy League" | 2016 | | B-Grade University |
| "Wes Anderson" | 2017 | | B-Grade University |
| "Every Day's the Weekend" | 2017 | ARIA: Gold | I Love You Like a Brother |
| "Lotto in Reverse" | 2017 | | I Love You Like a Brother |
| "I Haven't Been Taking Care of Myself" | 2017 | | I Love You Like a Brother |
| "There's No Money" | 2017 | | I Love You Like a Brother |
| "I Love You Like a Brother" | 2018 | | I Love You Like a Brother |
| "Don't Be So Hard on Yourself" | 2019 | | The Best of Luck Club |
| "Am I Doing It Right?" | 2019 | | The Best of Luck Club |
| "Unspoken History" | 2019 | | The Best of Luck Club |
| "Welcome to the Black Parade" (Triple J Like a Version) | 2019 | | Non-album single |
| "Sucker for Punishment" | 2020 | | Non-album single |
| "Merry Christmas (I Don't Want to Fight Tonight)" | 2020 | | Non-album single |
| "Dino's" (with Gordi) | 2021 | | Non-album single |
| "Spike the Punch" | 2021 | | Non-album single |
| "Congratulations" | 2022 | | The Answer Is Always Yes |
| "Shit Talkin'" | 2022 | | The Answer Is Always Yes |
| "Good Time" | 2023 | | The Answer Is Always Yes |
| "They Wouldn't Let Me in" | 2023 | | The Answer Is Always Yes |
| "The Sky Is Melting" | 2023 | | The Answer Is Always Yes |
| "On the Way Down" | 2023 | | The Answer Is Always Yes |
| "Ego Is Not a Dirty Word" | 2023 | | Mushroom: Fifty Years of Making Noise (Reimagined) |
| "Newsreader" | 2023 | | The Answer Is Always Yes (re-issue) |
| "When the Rain Comes Down" | 2023 | | The Answer Is Always Yes (re-issue) |
| "Break the Ice" (with Bob Junior) | 2025 | | Non-album single |
| "Don't Wanna Know" / "Rock & Roll Queen" | 2025 | | Non-album single |
| "You Don't Think You Like People Like Me" (featuring Tegan and Sara) | 2026 | | B-Grade University (10th Anniversary) |
| "Let's Go Out" (featuring Slowly Slowly (band)) | 2026 | | B-Grade University (10th Anniversary) |

==== As featured artist ====
| Title | Year | Album |
|---|---|---|
| "Skinny Dipping" (Stand Atlantic featuring Alex Lahey) | 2019 | Skinny Dipping |

==== Other appearances ====
| Title | Year | Album |
|---|---|---|
| "On My Way" | 2021 | The Mitchells vs. the Machines (Original Motion Picture Soundtrack) |

=== Selected production and writing discography ===
| Year | Artist | Song | Label | Role |
|---|---|---|---|---|
| 2020 | Sweater Curse | "Close" | Independent | Co-writer |
| 2020 | Gordi | "Sandwiches" | Jagjaguwar/Liberation | Add. engineering |
| 2020 | Gordi | "Limits" | Jagjaguwar/Liberation | Add. engineering |
| 2020 | BLOXX | "Give Me The Keys" | Chess Club | Co-writer |
| 2020 | Maggie Lindemann | "Knife Under My Pillow" | swixxzaudio | Co-writer |
| 2020 | Maggie Lindemann | "Crash and Burn" | swixxzaudio | Co-writer |
| 2021 | Keli Holiday | "Where You Feel" | Independent | Co-Writer |
| 2021 | Japanese Wallpaper | "Leave A Light On" | Wonderlick / Sony Music | Co-Writer, backing vocals |
| 2021 | Gordi | "Grass Is Blue" | Jagjaguwar/Liberation | Producer, engineer |
| 2022 | Teen Jesus and the Jean Teasers | "Pretty Good for a Girl Band" EP | Domestic La La | Producer, co-writer |
| 2022 | Christian Lee Hutson | "Rubberneckers" | Anti | Co-writer |
| 2022 | Maggie Lindemann | "how could you do this to me" ft Kellin Quinn | swixxzaudio | Co-writer |
| 2022 | Maggie Lindemann | "cages" | swixxzaudio | Co-writer |
| 2022 | Gordi | "Way I Go" | Jagjaguwar/Liberation | Producer, engineer, co-writer |
| 2024 | The Buoys | "Check Mate" | Sony Music/Arcadia | Co-writer |
| 2025 | Gordi | "Peripheral Lover" | Liberation | Co-writer |
| 2025 | Gordi | "Cutting Room Floor | Liberation | Co-writer |
| 2025 | Maggie Lindemann | "spine" | swixxzaudio | Co-writer |

== Awards and nominations ==
=== AIR Awards ===
The Australian Independent Record Awards (commonly known informally as AIR Awards) is an annual awards night to recognise, promote and celebrate the success of Australia's Independent Music sector.

| Year | Nominee / work | Award | Result |
|---|---|---|---|
| 2017 | herself | Best Independent Artist | Nominated |
| 2017 | herself | Breakthrough Independent Artist | Nominated |
| 2017 | B-Grade University | Best Independent Album | Nominated |
| 2017 | "You Don't Think You Like People Like Me" | Best Independent Single or EP | Nominated |
| 2018 | herself | Best Independent Artist | Nominated |
| 2018 | I Love You Like a Brother | Best Independent Album | Nominated |
| 2018 | "Every Day's the Weekend" | Best Independent Single or EP | Won |
| 2024 | The Answer Is Always Yes | Best Independent Rock Album or EP | Nominated |

=== APRA Awards ===
The APRA Awards have been presented annually since 1982 by the Australasian Performing Right Association (APRA), "honouring composers and songwriters".

| Year | Nominee / work | Award | Result | Ref. |
|---|---|---|---|---|
| 2018 | "Everyday’s the Weekend" | Song of the Year | Shortlisted | |

=== ARIA Music Awards ===
The ARIA Music Awards is an annual award ceremony event celebrating the Australian music industry.

| Year | Nominee / work | Award | Result | Ref. |
|---|---|---|---|---|
| 2018 | I Love You Like a Brother | Breakthrough Artist | Nominated | |
| 2023 | The Answer Is Always Yes | Best Adult Contemporary Album | Nominated | |

=== J Award ===
The J Awards are an annual series of Australian music awards that were established by the Australian Broadcasting Corporation's youth-focused radio station Triple J. They commenced in 2005.

| Year | Nominee / work | Award | Result |
|---|---|---|---|
| 2016 | herself | Unearthed Artist of the Year | Nominated |
| 2017 | I Love You Like a Brother | Australian Album of the Year | Nominated |

=== Music Victoria Awards ===
The Music Victoria Awards, are an annual awards night celebrating Victorian music. They commenced in 2005.

| Year | Nominee / work | Award | Result | Ref. |
|---|---|---|---|---|
| 2016 | "You Don’t Think You Like People Like Me" | Best Song | Nominated | |
| 2016 | herself | Best Female Artist | Won | |
| 2016 | herself | Best Emerging Artist | Nominated | |
| 2018 | herself | Best Solo Artist | Nominated | |
| 2019 | herself | Best Solo Artist | Nominated | |
| 2021 | "Dino's" (with Gordi) | Best Victorian Song | Nominated | |

=== National Live Music Awards ===
The National Live Music Awards (NLMAs) are a broad recognition of Australia's diverse live industry, celebrating the success of the Australian live scene. The awards commenced in 2016.

| Year | Nominee / work | Award | Result |
|---|---|---|---|
| 2016 | herself | The Heatseeker Award (Best New Act) | Nominated |
| 2017 | herself | International Live Achievement (Solo) | Nominated |
| 2017 | herself | People's Choice - Live Act of the Year | Nominated |
| 2018 | herself | International Live Achievement (Solo) | Nominated |
| 2018 | herself | Victorian Live Act of the Year | Won |
