= Fuzzy Operations =

Australian music festival promoter

- Type: Subsidiary of Superstruct Entertainment
- Industry: Live music promotion
- Genre: Electronic dance music, Hip hop, Indie
- Founded: 1996
- Founders: John Wall, Ming Gan
- Headquarters: Sydney, New South Wales, Australia
- Area served: Australia, New Zealand
- Key people: Adelle Robinson (CEO)
- Products: Field Day, Listen Out, Harbourlife
- Website: fuzzy.com.au

Fuzzy Operations (commonly known as Fuzzy) is a leading Australian music event promoter based in Sydney. Founded in 1996, the company is credited with pioneering the outdoor electronic music festival circuit in Australia, launching major annual events including Field Day, Harbourlife, and Listen Out.

== History ==
Fuzzy was founded in 1996 by DJs and promoters John Wall and Ming Gan. The company's initial events were club nights at the Sydney venue Sublime. In 2000, Fuzzy launched Parklife, which expanded into a national touring festival and helped popularise the "indie-dance" movement in Australia.

== Corporate ownership ==
In 2018, Fuzzy was acquired by Superstruct Entertainment, a global festival platform founded by James Barton and backed by Providence Equity Partners. This acquisition integrated Fuzzy into a network of over 80 international festivals, including Sónar and Sziget.

In June 2024, global investment firm KKR acquired Superstruct Entertainment from Providence for approximately €1.3 billion ($1.4 billion). In October 2024, CVC Capital Partners joined KKR as a strategic partner in the ownership group.

== Major festivals ==
=== Field Day ===
Launched on New Year's Day 2002, Field Day is held at The Domain. It is positioned as a "smart alternative" to traditional New Year's Eve parties and has featured international headliners such as Skrillex, Tyler, the Creator, and Flume.

=== Listen Out and Listen In ===
In 2013, Fuzzy replaced the national Parklife tour with Listen Out, a boutique touring festival focusing specifically on electronic and hip-hop music. The event tours Sydney, Melbourne, Perth, and Brisbane. In 2018, the company launched a sub-brand, Listen In, specifically for the Adelaide and Auckland markets.

=== Harbourlife ===
Harbourlife is a boutique house music event held annually at Mrs Macquaries Point. It is notable for its proximity to the Sydney Opera House and has historically hosted high-profile house artists like Fatboy Slim and Carl Cox.

== Controversies and advocacy ==
In 2024 and 2025, Fuzzy faced public scrutiny regarding its ownership by KKR. NSW Greens MP Cate Faehrmann questioned the NSW Government's decision to award up to $500,000 in viability funding to Listen Out and Field Day, citing KKR's external investments in defense and surveillance technology. In May 2025, several artists pulled out of Superstruct-affiliated festivals, including the UK edition of Field Day, in protest of the KKR connection.
