= Godlands =

Australian musician, DJ, and music producer

- Born: Annabel Hartlett
- Origin: Adelaide, South Australia, Australia
- Genres: EDM, trap
- Instruments: DJ, record producer
- Years active: 2017–present
- Labels: Dim Mak; Monstercat

Annabel Hartlett, known by her stage name Godlands, is an Australian DJ, songwriter, and music producer. Godlands has performed at many Australian music festivals and events including: Tomorrowland, Festival X 2019, Party In The Paddock, This That, Alison Wonderland's Scarehouse Project, Wildlands, Factory Presents, Touch Bass, and Spilt Milk. Godlands is signed to Steve Aoki's record label Dim Mak Records, and United Talent Agency.

== Discography ==
=== Extended plays ===
- 4 U Only (2019)
- Ready 2 Rage (2021)
- GODSP33D (2022)
- Bleach (2023)

=== Singles ===
2017

- "Finally"
- "Hit Em Like This"

2018

- "Everybody Knows"
- "Pleasures"
- "Wild"
- "Horses" ft Jessica Lamont
- "2 Clips"

2019

- "Valour" (featuring Boi)
- "Back Now"
- "Lowkey" (with Nxsty, featuring Lil Traffic)
- "Hellraiser" (with Blanke)

2020

- "Drop It Low" (featuring Yung Bambi)
- "Smoke Em Up" (featuring SAMPLEGOD)
- "JOHNNY"

2022

- "GODSP33D"
- "Tell Me"(with Tisoki)
- "Cashmere" (featuring boler mani)
- "SLEEPER / SICKO"

2023

- "u want me"
- "Charmer"
- "Crashing"

== Personal life ==
She is the sister of former AFL players Hamish Hartlett (Port Adelaide) and Adam Hartlett (Carlton). She was educated at Sacred Heart College.
