= Field Day (Sydney festival) =

Australian annual music festival

- Status: Active
- Genre: Electronic dance music, Hip hop, Indie
- Frequency: Annual (New Year's Day)
- Locations: The Domain, Sydney, New South Wales
- Country: Australia
- Years active: 2002–present
- Founded: 2002
- Founder: Fuzzy Operations
- Attendance: 25,000–28,000
- Website: fieldday.com.au

Field Day is an annual outdoor music festival held on New Year's Day at The Domain in Sydney, Australia. Established in 2002 by the promoter Fuzzy Operations, the event has become a fixture of the Australian summer festival season, typically attracting between 25,000 and 28,000 attendees.

== History ==
=== 2002–2010: Establishment and growth ===
The inaugural Field Day was held on January 1, 2002. It was conceived as a "smart alternative" to the high-intensity parties of New Year's Eve, focusing on a mix of electronic, house, and indie-dance music. The festival saw rapid growth throughout the 2000s, being voted the "Best Event" in New South Wales in the annual InTheMix 50 poll in both 2007 and 2008.

=== 2021–2025: Challenges and COVID-19 ===
For the first time since its inception, the 2021 edition of Field Day was cancelled due to the COVID-19 pandemic in Australia. The festival returned in 2022 with a reduced capacity and a focus on domestic talent.

The 2024 edition saw a significant police presence, with 25 people charged with drug offences and 91 detected in possession of illicit substances. Despite these challenges, the event remained one of the few large-scale Australian festivals to continue operating through the industry-wide downturn of 2024–2025.

=== 2026: 25th Anniversary and "CAMP GROUND" ===
In 2026, Field Day celebrated its 25th anniversary. To mark the milestone, the festival introduced a new stage titled CAMP GROUND, specifically dedicated to Sydney's queer talent and curated by members of the LGBTQIA+ community. The anniversary lineup featured headliners Carl Cox and Jamie Jones performing both solo and back-to-back sets, alongside The Presets, Patrick Topping, and Deborah De Luca.

== Location ==
Since its founding in 2002, Field Day has been held at The Domain, a 34-hectare public parkland located on the eastern edge of the Sydney central business district on the traditional lands of the Gadigal people. The site's proximity to the Oxford Street precinct has historically contributed to the festival's popularity within Sydney's LGBTQIA+ community.

In 2026, Field Day was officially accepted into the "Oxford Street Pride Charter," a commitment to maintaining the precinct as a safe and inclusive haven for queer communities. The festival layout typically utilizes multiple stages across the Phillip and Crescent precincts of The Domain, with the main entrance located on Art Gallery Road across from the Art Gallery of New South Wales.

== See also ==
- Parklife Music Festival
- Fuzzy Operations

== See also ==
- Parklife Music Festival
- Fuzzy Operations
