= Spilt Milk (festival) =

Australian multi-city music festival

- Genre: Australian; rock; alternative rock; indie rock; hip-hop; electronic
- Dates: November and December
- Locations: Canberra, Australia (2016–present); Gold Coast (2019–present); Ballarat (2019–2025); Perth (2023–present); Geelong (2026–present)
- Years active: 2016–present
- Founders: Kicks Entertainment
- Website: spilt-milk.com.au

Spilt Milk is an Australian music festival first held exclusively in Canberra in 2016 before expanding to Ballarat in 2019, Gold Coast in 2022, and Perth in 2023.

Spilt Milk was established by Kicks Entertainment and has sold out within hours every single year of launching.

The festival is normally held in November and December each year, although the 2020, 2021 and 2024 festivals did not go ahead, the former two due to restrictions related to the COVID-19 pandemic in Australia and the latter related to financial costs and fluctuating ticket sales, though the 2024 edition was able to run as smaller "House Party" events instead.

== Awards and nominations ==
=== ARIA Music Awards ===
The ARIA Music Awards is an annual awards ceremony that recognises excellence, innovation, and achievement across all genres of Australian music.

Year	Nominee / work	Award	Result	Ref.
2026	Spilt Milk	Best Music Festival	Nominated	

=== National Live Music Awards ===
The National Live Music Awards (NLMAs) are a broad recognition of Australia's diverse live industry, celebrating the success of the Australian live scene. The awards commenced in 2016.

Year	Nominee / work	Award	Result
National Live Music Awards of 2018	Spilt Milk	ACT Live Event of the Year	Won
National Live Music Awards of 2018	Spilt Milk	ACT Live Event of the Year	Won

== Lineups year by year ==
As listed on the official website. Bold indicates headline act. All acts are Australian unless stated otherwise.

=== 2016 ===
In Alphabetical Order

- Allday
- Champion Ruby
- Coda Conduct
- Cosmo's Midnight
- Client Liaison
- Dena Amy
- DMA's
- E^ST
- Emma Stevenson
- FB Perimeter
- **Flume**
- Gang Of Youths
- Genesis Owusu
- Hermitude
- Honey Dijon **(USA)**
- Honeysuckle
- Hot Dub Time Machine
- Kangaroo Life Saver
- LDRU
- Lucy CLiche
- ~~Magda Bytnerowicz~~
- Megan Bones
- Olympia
- Paces
- Peking Duk
- Randomer **(UK)**
- Skin & Bones
- Sondrio
- Slumberjack
- Sticky Fingers
- Turquoise Prince LTC
- Valerie Yum
- Ventures
- Vince Staples **(USA)**
- Violent Soho
- Young Monks

=== 2017 ===
In Alphabetical Order

- **Alison Wonderland**
- Avon Stringer
- Bad Dreems
- **Blanke**
- Carmada
- Cashmere Cat **(NOR)**
- Casual Connection
- Clique
- Crooked Colours
- Dean Lewis
- Dune Rats
- Feki
- Illy
- Jax Jones **(UK)**
- KG
- Kilter
- King Gizzard & the Lizard Wizard
- **Lorde** **(NZ)**
- Mallrat
- Manila Folder
- Mia Sorlie
- Megan Bones
- Pon Cho
- Remi x Sampa the Great
- San Cisco
- Sports
- Super Cruel
- Tash Sultana
- Vallis Alps
- Vance Joy
- What So Not
- Winston Surfshirt

=== 2018 ===
In Alphabetical Order

- Angus & Julia Stone
- Blanke
- Carmouflage Rose
- Channel Tres **(USA)**
- ~~**Childish Gambino** **(USA)**~~
- Clique
- Cub Sport
- Ebony Boadu
- Golden Features
- Hatchie
- Hayden James
- Jack River
- Kinder
- Kira Puru
- Kwame
- Manu Crooks
- Methyl Ethel
- Miss Blanks
- Moaning Lisa
- **Peking Duk**
- **RL Grime** **(USA)**
- Rolling Blackouts Coastal Fever
- **ShockOne**
- Skegss
- Thandi Phoenix
- The Jungle Giants
- The Wombats **(UK)**
- Thundamentals
- Vera Blue
- Willaris. K
- YG **(USA)**

- Childish Gambino withdrew from the lineup due to a foot injury. He was replaced by Angus & Julia Stone and Golden Features.

=== 2019 ===
- Allday
- Arno Faraji
- Bene **(NZ)**
- Choomba
- Chvrches **(UK)**
- Clique
- Confidence Man
- Dom Dolla
- Dune Rats
- G Flip
- **Godlands**
- **Golden Features**
- Groove City
- Illy
- Juice Wrld **(USA)**
- **Khalid** **(USA)**
- Kota Banks
- Lastlings
- Lime Cordiale
- Mansionair
- Middle Kids
- Ocean Alley
- Psychedelic Porn Crumpets
- Rat!hammock (Ballarat only)
- Running Touch
- Sippy
- Teen Jesus and the Jean Teasers (Canberra only)
- Tones and I
- Winston Surfshirt

- The Ballarat festival would be Juice Wrld's final performance before his death on 8 December 2019.

=== 2022 ===
In Alphabetical Order

- A.Girl
- Beddy Rays
- **Billy Xane**
- Clique (Canberra only)
- **Fisher**
- **Flume**
- G Flip
- Genesis Owusu
- Hayden James
- King Stingray
- Kobie Dee
- Latifa Tee
- Little Fritter
- Mallrat
- Mansionair
- Ninajirachi
- Peach PRC
- Spacey Jane
- Stand Atlantic
- Steve Lacy **(USA)**
- ~~Stormzy **(UK)**~~
- Telenova
- The Wombats **(UK)**
- Toro y Moi **(USA)** (Canberra only)
- YNG Martyr
- Young Franco
- 1300
- Stormzy withdrew from the lineup due to "circumstances beyond his control" and was replaced by Steve Lacy

=== 2023 ===
- Aitch **(UK)**
- Budjerah
- Brittany De Marco (Canberra only)
- Chris Lake **(UK)**
- Clique (Canberra only)
- Cub Sport
- Dave Winnel (Canberra only)
- ~~David Kushner **(USA)**~~
- Dermot Kennedy **(IRE)**
- Djanaba
- **Dom Dolla**
- G.A.C.T. (Canberra only)
- Grentperez
- Jessie Murph **(USA)**
- Killjoy **(UK)** (Canberra only)
- Lastlings
- Latto **(USA)**
- Lime Cordiale
- MAY-A
- **Mincy**
- Ocean Alley
- Pacific Avenue
- Peach PRC
- POOLCLVB
- **Post Malone** **(USA)**
- RedHook
- Royel Otis
- Ruel
- The Buoys
- The Dreggs
- Tia Gostelow
- Tkay Maidza
- Waxlily (Canberra only)
- Zach Knows (Canberra only)

- David Kushner withdrew from the lineup due to "unforeseen circumstances" and was replaced by Ruel

=== 2025 ===
- Baby J
- Chance Pena **(USA)**
- ~~D4vd **(USA)**~~
- **Doechii** **(USA)**
- Dominic Fike **(USA)**
- Don West
- Ennaria
- Esha Tewari
- Genesis Owusu
- **Kendrick Lamar** **(USA)**
- Lyric
- Mia Wray
- Nessa Barrett **(USA)**
- Ninajirachi
- Rebecca Black **(USA)**
- Rum Jungle
- Sara Landry **(USA/NLD)**
- Schoolboy Q **(USA)**
- Skin on Skin
- Sofia Isella **(USA)**
- Sombr **(USA)**
- South Summit
- The Dreggs
- Restricted
- The Rions

- D4vd was removed from the lineup and his Australian sideshows were cancelled due to an ongoing homicide investigation against him in the USA. He was later replaced by Genesis Owusu.

=== 2026 ===
- Aleksiah
- Baby Keem **(USA)**
- Becca Hatch
- Borderline **(NZ)**
- DMA's
- F3miii **(IRE)**
- Fat Papi **(NZ)**
- Harry Hayes
- jigitz **(USA)**
- Kettama **(IRE)**
- **Lewis Capaldi** **(UK)**
- Leyla Ebrahimi **(USA)**
- Maisie Peters **(UK)**
- Miss Kaninna
- Pash
- **Raye** **(UK)**
- Remi Wolf **(USA)**
- Samara Cyn **(USA)**
- STÜM
- The Moving Stills
- The Terrys
- Tobiahs
- Yes Boone
