= Imbi the Girl =

Australian singer-songwriter, rapper and poet

imbi
- Born: Imbar Amira Nassi; 16 April 1997 (age 29); Sydney
- Genres: Hip hop; R&B
- Occupations: Singer-songwriter; rapper; poet
- Years active: 2017–present

Imbar Amira Nassi, known as Imbi the Girl (styled as imbi the girl), is an Australian singer-songwriter, rapper and poet who was born and raised in Sydney.

== Career ==
In June 2017, imbi the girl's debut single "acidic" was released which was soon followed by the release of "V.I.P." in September.

imbi the girl is listed as a feature artist on Esoterik's 2018 single "Wide Awake", part of his EP My Astral Plane which was nominated for the 2018 ARIA Award for Best Urban Release.

In April 2018, imbi the girl was announced as a winner of the Triple J Unearthed and NIDA competition that saw students direct and produce a music video which was premiered on the television show rage later in the year.

imbi the girl's debut EP, for me, was released in September 2018, shortly after the release of their third single "swell". They describe the EP as "a small taste of the goodness that is yet to come."

In May 2019, imbi the girl travelled to London after being chosen by APRA AMCOS to take part in SongHubs, which aims to connect local and international songwriters.

In October 2019, imbi the girl was nominated for Live Voice of the Year (NSW) at the National Live Music Awards.

== Touring ==
imbi the girl has performed at festivals such as Groovin The Moo, BIGSOUND, Laneway, Party in the Paddock and Festival of the Sun.

In September 2018, they toured nationally with Listen Out which saw performances in Melbourne, Perth, Sydney and Brisbane.

imbi the girl has supported artists such as FKJ, Sampa the Great, Horrorshow, as well as Odette on her national tour throughout March and April in 2019.

In April 2019, imbi the girl announced their first headline tour, visiting venues in Sydney, Melbourne and Brisbane in June.

== Influences ==
In an interview with Oyster, imbi the girl said they "grew up listening to Amy Winehouse and Macy Gray with my mum, and Wyclef Jean and The Fugees with my dad". As Imbar got older, they "started listening to Chance the Rapper, Childish Gambino, Noname and Lizzo". imbi the girl credits Allen Ginsberg and Sarah Kay as notable poetic influences. They told Gay Times magazine that they've "always looked up to Missy Elliott and her ability to be who she was unapologetically and express herself truthfully through not only her music but her fashion and her whole demeanour".

== Personal life ==
imbi the girl is queer and non-binary. They use they/them and he/him pronouns.

== Discography ==
=== Extended plays ===
Title	Album details
for me	Released: 14 September 2018; Format: Digital download
back then	Released: 14 November 2019; Format: Digital download

=== Singles ===
==== As lead artist ====
Title	Year	Album
"acidic"	2017	for me
"V.I.P."	2017	for me
"swell"	2018	for me
"i used to" (featuring SUPEREGO)	2019	back then
"our room"	2019	back then
"peaches & scream" (featuring Genesis Owusu)	2019	back then

==== As featured artist ====
Title	Year	Album
"Contraband & Conversation" (Spit Syndicate featuring imbi the girl & Kai)	2018	Orbit
"Wide Awake" (Esoterik featuring imbi the girl & Spazzy D)	2018	My Astral Plane
"You See Me" (Oh Boy featuring imbi the girl)	2018	Non-album single
