= The Dreggs =

Australian folk pop duo

- Origin: Sunshine Coast, Queensland, Australia
- Genres: Folk pop
- Years active: 2017–present
- Label: The Dreggs
- Members: Paddy Macrae; Zane Harris

The Dreggs are an Australian folk pop duo formed in 2017 consisting of Paddy Macrae and Zane Harris from Bribie Island. Emerging from the Sunshine Coast's thriving music scene, the band has rapidly evolved into a formidable international live act, renowned for their high-energy, mass-singalong performances. They released their highly acclaimed debut album, Caught in a Reverie, in 2024, followed by their sophomore album, The Art of Uncommon Practice, in July 2025, which saw the band pushing into bolder, expansive rock sonic territory.

== Career ==
=== 2017–2022: Career beginnings and multiple singles ===
The duo was formed in 2017 by Paddy Macrae and Zane Harris, busking in the streets up the Sunshine Coast. The name, the Dreggs, comes from when they were promoting one of their local live shows and Harris said, "Let's see what these Dreggs have done." The duo liked the sound of it and adopted it as their artist name.

The Dreggs released their debut single "Give Myself to You" in 2017 and a 6-track EP titled Seas Embrace in May 2018.

In 2018 the duo released the singles titled "Gold" and "Feel Alive".

Throughout 2019 the duo released the singles "Just for One Night" and "You And Me".

During 2020 the duo released the five singles; "Postcards", "Simple Question", "Call Me Home", "A Song to Be Named" and "Keepsake".

2021 brought about the duo's singles, "Head Above Water", "Let You Go" and "Your Love".

The singles titled, "The Forest Song", "Hold Me Closer" and "Madeline" were released throughout 2022 by the duo.

=== 2023–2024: Increasing popularity and Caught in a Reverie ===
In July 2023, "Give Myself to You" was certified gold in Australia.

On 2 June 2023, the duo released the track "For Your Love" from their debut album. Later in the year on September 29 the duo released another track from the album titled "Take a Little Time".

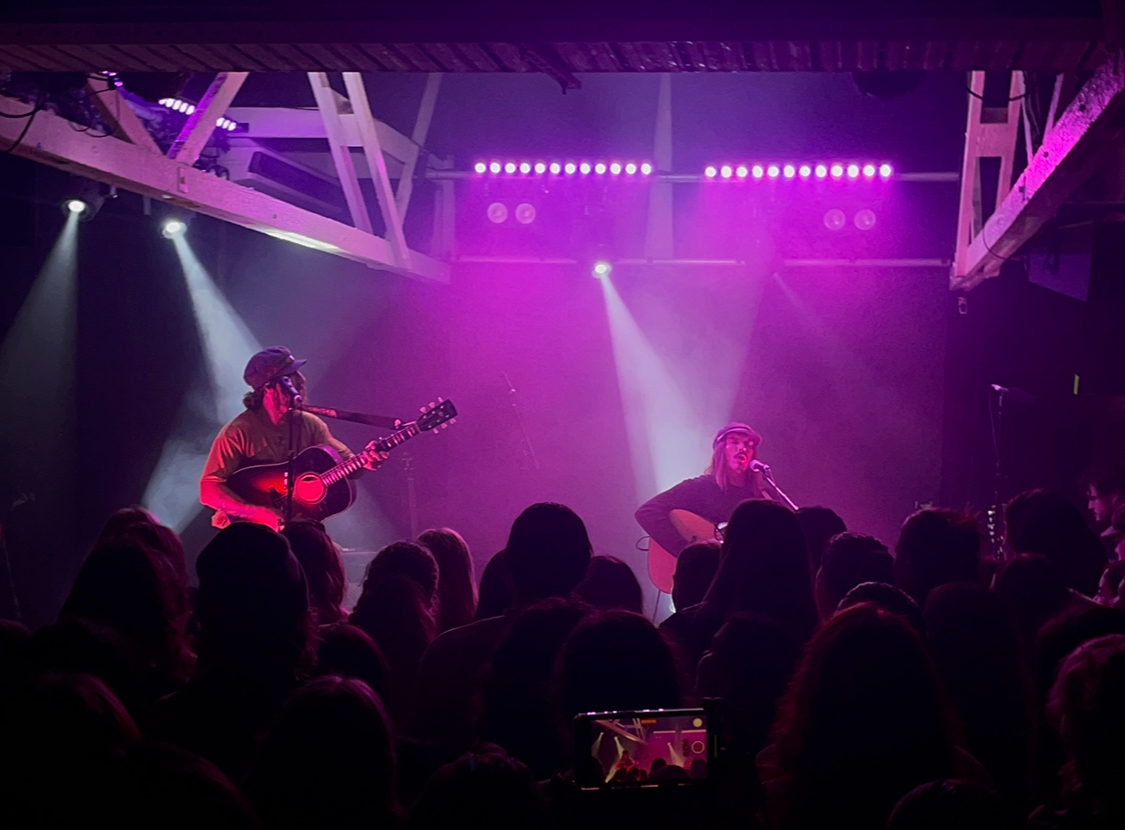
The Dreggs Performing at Torquay Hotel 2023

The Dreggs were the first feature artist for Triple J Unearthed in 2024 further increasing their growth and reach.

In November and December 2023 the Dreggs appeared at their first Triple J sponsored music festival, Spilt Milk and performed at Canberra, Gold Coast, Ballarat and Perth.

In February 2024 the duo released their single "Places" on Triple J. A couple of days later they announced their upcoming debut album titled Caught in a Reverie, which features 12 tracks and will be released on 26 April 2024. To support the album the duo announced album launch parties in parts of Queensland and Victoria. The duo also announced a UK/EU tour to support the album, as well as another tour throughout Australia and New Zealand.

The duo was announced as one of the acts to perform at Australian music festival, Splendour in the Grass in July 2024, their first appearance at the festival. However the major festival was cancelled merely weeks after ticket went on sale. The duo revealed they were set to perform on the main stage and were publicly vocal on the impacts this cancellation has on the Australian music scene with Macrae stating "For everything to get cancelled in the blink of an eye, it's terrifying".

The duo released their fourth single from their album titled "Peeps with the Goods" on 22 March 2024, the track has Australian artist Matt Corby credited as a writer and producer for the track.

On 26 April 2024 the duo released their debut album Caught in a Reverie, which features 12 tracks.

=== 2025: The Art of Uncommon Practice ===
In 2025, The Dreggs entered a bold new era with the release of their sophomore album, The Art of Uncommon Practice (released July 25, 2025). Preceded by singles like "Get Knocked Down" and "We Don't Talk"—co-written and co-produced by Matt Corby and Chris Collins—the album pushed the band's signature sound into driving indie-rock territory.

The year also marked their milestone debut on Triple J's prestigious Like A Version, where they delivered a widely praised, high-energy cover of A-ha's 80s classic "Take On Me". The performance was a massive success, leading to The Dreggs securing two spots in the Triple J Hottest 100 of 2025: their "Take On Me" cover landed at #70, alongside their original single "We Don't Talk" at #91.

Following a massive sold-out Australian national tour in July, The Dreggs embarked on an extensive global run, including major headline tours across North America, the UK, and Europe throughout late 2025. The band is also slated to perform at major 2026 festivals, including Lime Cordiales Lime Fest.

=== Studio albums ===
List of albums, with selected details
Title	Album details	Peak chart positions
Title	Album details	AUS
Caught in a Reverie	Released: 26 April 2024; Label: The Dreggs; Format: CD, LP, digital download, streaming	29
The Art of Uncommon Practice	Released: 25 July 2025; Label: The Dreggs; Format: CD, LP, digital download, streaming	63

=== Extended plays ===
List of EPs, with selected details
Title	Details
Seas Embrace	Released: May 2018; Label: Self-released; Format: Digital

=== Certified singles ===
List of certified singles, with year released year and certifications
Title	Year	Certifications	Album
"Give Myself to You"	2017	ARIA: Platinum	Seas Embrace

== Awards and nominations ==
=== AIR Awards ===
The Australian Independent Record Awards (commonly known informally as AIR Awards) is an annual awards night to recognise, promote and celebrate the success of Australia's Independent Music sector.

Year	Nominee / work	Award	Result	Ref.
2025	Caught in a Reverie	Independent Album of the Year	Nominated	
2025	The Dreggs	Breakthrough Independent Artist of the Year	Nominated	

=== Queensland Music Awards ===
The Queensland Music Awards (previously known as Q Song Awards) are annual awards celebrating Queensland, Australia's brightest emerging artists and established legends. They commenced in 2006.

Year	Nominee / work	Award	Result (wins only)	Ref.
2026	"We Don't Talk"	Folk Award	Won	
