= Every Day's the Weekend =

Single by Alex Lahey

from the album I Love You Like a Brother
- Released: 28 July 2017
- Length: 3:10
- Label: Alex Lahey, Nicky Boy Records
- Songwriter(s): Alex Lahey

Alex Lahey singles chronology
"Wes Anderson" (2017)	"Every Day's the Weekend" (2017)	"Lotto in Reverse" (2017)

Music video
- "Every Day's the Weekend" on YouTube

"Every Day's the Weekend" is a song by Australian recording artist Alex Lahey. The song was released in July 2017 as the lead single from Lahey's debut studio album, I Love You Like a Brother, and was certified gold in 2019.

Upon release, Lahey said "I wrote it about that feeling when you really like someone, you're hanging out all the time, and the rest of your life falls by the wayside. It's almost like, 'oh I'm just going to pull a sickie and hang out', that sort of vibe. So, the song is about losing sight of maybe what's important to you as an individual for the supposed benefit of maybe spending time with someone else."

At the AIR Awards of 2018, the song won Best Independent Single.

== Certification ==
Region	Certification	Certified units/sales
Australia (ARIA)	Gold	35,000^{‡}
^{‡} Sales+streaming figures based on certification alone.
