= The Answer Is Always Yes =

Studio album by Alex Lahey
- Released: 19 May 2023
- Genre: Indie rock
- Length: 34:53
- Label: Liberation

Alex Lahey studio album chronology
The Best of Luck Club (2019)	The Answer Is Always Yes (2023)

Singles from The Answer Is Always Yes
- 1. "Congratulations" Released: 1 September 2022; 2. "Shit Talkin'" Released: 11 November 2022; 3. "Good Time" Released: 31 January 2023; 4. "They Wouldn't Let Me In" Released: 31 March 2023; 5. "The Sky Is Melting" Released: 5 May 2023; 6. "On the Way Down" Released: 19 May 2023

Singles from The Answer Is Always Yes (Expanded Edition)
- 1. "Newsreader" Released: 21 September 2023; 2. "When the Rain Comes Down" Released: 6 October 2023

The Answer Is Always Yes is the third studio album by Australian singer-songwriter Alex Lahey. It was released on 19 May 2023 via Liberation Music, and supported by a North American tour from May to June. It is Lahey's first record to feature external songwriters and co-producers, marking a stylistic departure from her first two albums.

At the 2023 ARIA Music Awards, the album was nominated for Best Adult Contemporary Album.

At the AIR Awards of 2024, the album was nominated for Best Independent Rock Album or EP.

== Production ==
Music publication Billboard found the album to have an optimistic outlook on life despite its lyricism focusing on some discomforting topics, with Taylor Mims writing "her positivity breaks through with fuzzy guitar riffs, playful pop tunes, angsty post-punk tracks and her ever-present sense of humor". The Answer Is Always Yes is Alex Lahey's first album to feature external collaborators, whom the artist was originally reluctant to introduce, but upon reflection: "I was able to let them do their best work ... and that's why it worked".

== Release and promotion ==
On 1 September 2022, lead single "Congratulations" was issued alongside a music video and dates for a regional tour beginning in October 2022. Upon the release, Lahey explained she was "drawn to examine her past relationships, and reckon with the feeling she had when seeing her former partners move on". She also hinted that the single was "the first taste in a long-awaited new chapter". On 11 November, second single "Shit Talkin'" was released. The record was officially announced on 1 February 2023 following the premiere of third single, "Good Time", on Triple J.

Following the release of the album, Lahey embarked on a 23-date North American tour, going from May to June. In August 2023, she commenced a nationwide Australian tour.

On 21 September 2023, Lahey announced an expanded edition of The Answer Is Always Yes, which released on 6 October. A new single, "Newsreader", was issued alongside the news.

== Reception ==
Professional ratings
Review scores
Source	Rating
The Line of Best Fit	7/10
The Newcastle Herald	3.5/5 stars
Pitchfork	7.5/10

John Amen of The Line of Best Fit concluded the album had a "lighter palette" with "sonics relatively subdued, mixes less raucous" compared to her first two records. He concluded that "her melodies are consistently enrolling, and her lyrics [...] are aptly accessible". Writing for Beat Magazine, Bryget Chrisfield said that The Answer Is Always Yes was an "ebullient and infinitely relatable" listen.

== Track listing ==
Standard edition track listing
No.	Title	Writer(s)	Producer(s)	Length
1.	"Good Time"	Alex Lahey; Jacknife Lee	Lee	3:11
2.	"Congratulations"	Lahey; Bradley Hale	Lahey; John Castle	2:50
3.	"You'll Never Get Your Money Back"	Lahey; Jenny Owen Youngs; Jess Abbott	Lahey; Castle	3:07
4.	"The Sky Is Melting"	Lahey; Ali Barter; Oscar Dawson	Lahey; Dawson	4:06
5.	"On the Way Down"	Lahey; Dawson	Lahey; Dawson	3:35
6.	"Makes Me Sick"	Lahey; Sean Kennedy	Lahey; Dawson	4:04
7.	"Shit Talkin'"	Lahey; John Mark Nelson	Lahey; Castle	3:19
8.	"Permanent"	Lahey; Suzy Shinn	Lahey; Castle	3:33
9.	"They Wouldn't Let Me In"	Lahey; Chris Collins	Lahey; Collins	2:43
10.	"The Answer Is Always Yes"	Lahey; Jonny Shorr	Lahey; Dawson	4:25
Total length:				34:53

Expanded edition track listing
No.	Title	Writer(s)	Producer(s)	Length
11.	"It Doesn't Matter Anymore"	Lahey; Christian Lee Hutson; Paul Daniel Cherewick	Lahey; Castle; Sam Cromack	3:12
12.	"Newsreader"	Lahey; Hutson; Youngs	Lahey; Castle	3:39
13.	"When the Rain Comes Down"	Lahey; Youngs; Abbott	Lahey; Castle	3:49
Total length:				45:40

== Charts ==
Chart performance for The Answer Is Always Yes
Chart (2023)	Peak position
Australian Albums (ARIA)	55
