= Manu Crooks =

- Born: Emmanuel Adu
- Origin: Sydney, New South Wales, Australia
- Genres: Hip hop
- Occupations: Rapper, record producer
- Labels: Independent
- Website: https://www.manucrooks.com/

Emmanuel Adu, better known by his stage name Manu Crooks, is a recording artist based in Sydney.

== Biography ==
Emmanuel Adu grew up in Ghana and moved to Australia when he was 12 years old where he attended Parramatta High School. He found his love for music at an early age and began producing as a teenager. Manu has performed at many events and festivals including: Rolling Loud Festival, Splendour in the Grass, Falls Festival and Spilt Milk.

== Discography ==
=== EPs ===
List of EPs, with selected details
| Title | Details |
|---|---|
| Mood Forever | Released: August 2017; Format: Digital; Label: Mood Forever |
