= The Best of Luck Club =

Studio album by Alex Lahey
- Released: 17 May 2019
- Length: 40:21
- Label: Nicky Boy/Caroline

Alex Lahey chronology
I Love You Like a Brother (2017)	The Best of Luck Club (2019)	The Answer Is Always Yes (2023)

Singles from The Best of Luck Club
- 1. "Don't Be So Hard On Yourself" Released: 20 February 2019; 2. "Am I Doing It Right?" Released: 4 April 2019; 3. "Unspoken History" Released: 8 May 2019

Professional ratings
Aggregate scores
Source	Rating
Metacritic	77/100
Review scores
Source	Rating
Clash	8/10
Consequence of Sound	B+
DIY	3.5/5 stars
Exclaim!	8/10
Pitchfork	7.8/10

The Best of Luck Club is the second studio album by Australian singer-songwriter Alex Lahey. It was released on 17 May 2019 through Nicky Boy Records/Caroline Australia. The album peaked at number 30 on the ARIA Charts.

Lahey announced in February 2019 that the album would be followed by a nationwide Australian tour in 2019.

== Track listing ==
No.	Title	Length
1.	"I Don't Get Invited to Parties Anymore"	4:08
2.	"Am I Doing It Right?"	4:07
3.	"Interior Demeanour"	3:48
4.	"Don’t Be so Hard on Yourself"	4:18
5.	"Unspoken History"	4:30
6.	"Misery Guts"	2:33
7.	"Isabella"	3:37
8.	"I Need to Move On"	4:13
9.	"Black RMs"	4:34
10.	"I Want to Live with You"	4:33

== Charts ==
Chart (2019)	Peak position
Australian Albums (ARIA)	30
