= Perto (musician) =

Australian DJ

- Also known as: Perto
- Born: Rupert Howarth; Sydney, Australia
- Genres: Electronic; hyperpop
- Occupations: DJ; producer
- Instrument: Vocals
- Years active: 2017–present
- Labels: Warner Music Australia; Atlantic; Parlophone; Columbia
- Website: iamperto.com

Rupert Howarth, better known by his stage name Perto, is an Australian singer, DJ and music producer from Sydney, Australia. He gained global recognition after a video of his live performance went viral on Facebook in 2018.

== Early life ==
Perto grew up in Australia, not coming from a musical background. He started DJing friends' parties at the age of 10 after hearing Skrillex's Bangarang in the car. From there he attended Ableton Liveschool in Kings Cross, where he became the youngest graduate ever, surpassing the previous record holder, Flume.

== Career ==
Perto began networking with EDM icons by waiting outside of nightclubs and theaters in Sydney. From there, he grew a loyal following on SoundCloud before being signed to Warner Music Australasia at the age of 16.

Perto has been cited as producing with the likes of Timbaland, Billie Eilish, Iann Dior, Skrillex, Internet Money, Diplo, Ken Carson, and glaive.

He has toured Australia and Asia, playing the likes of Listen Out Festival, Grass is Greener Festival and Creamfields Hong Kong.

Perto was named one of the 50 Most Stylish Men in Music in 2019 by GQ Australia.

In 2020, he was set to make his U.S. debut performance in Miami followed by a full U.S. tour, but the shows had to be cancelled due to the rising concerns surrounding the COVID-19 pandemic.

In 2023, Perto signed with Columbia Records and released the single "Jester" on September 8 of that year. Following two additional singles, "Gore" and "Dead On," he released the extended play Bozo on December 1, 2023.
