= Carmouflage Rose =

Australian rapper/musician

- Also known as: Larry Herrington, Graham Herrington
- Born: Zimbabwe
- Origin: Brisbane, Australia
- Label: Sony Music Australia

Larry Herrington, known by his stage name Carmouflage Rose, is an Australian musician, singer, songwriter and rapper. He has played at Australian festivals and events including: Spilt Milk and Groovin The Moo. Larry signed a deal with Sony Music Australia in 2018. His song "Late Nights" was streamed 8.5 million times and was one of the top 30 songs played Triple J in 2017, and was the Gold in 2018.

On 19 March 2021, Carmouflage Rose released the double-A sided single "Tipsy"/"Powerplay".

== Discography ==
=== Extended plays ===
Title	Details
Taste	Released: 12 October 2018; Formats: Digital download, streaming; Label: Carmouflage Rose, Sony Music Australia
A Night With No Moon	Released: 6 August 2021; Formats: Digital download, streaming; Label: Carmouflage Rose, Sony Music Australia

=== Singles ===
List of singles, with certifications, showing year released and album name
Title	Year	Certifications	Album
"Late Nights"	2017	ARIA: Platinum	Taste
"Wildflowers"	2018		Taste
"Let Me Down" (featuring George Maple)	2018		Taste
"Sele"	2019		non album singles
"Million Styles"	2019		non album singles
"Tipsy"/"Powerplay"	2021		A Night With No Moon
"Bittersweet"	2021		A Night With No Moon

== Awards ==
=== Queensland Music Awards ===
The Queensland Music Awards (previously known as Q Song Awards) are annual awards celebrating Queensland, Australia's brightest emerging artists and established legends. They commenced in 2006.

Year	Nominee / work	Award	Result (wins only)
2020	"Sele"	Hip Hop / Rap Song of the Year	Won
