= Parklife Music Festival =

2000–2012 Australian annual touring music festival

- Status: Defunct
- Genre: Indie dance, Electronica, Hip hop
- Frequency: Annual (September/October)
- Locations: National (Sydney, Melbourne, Brisbane, Adelaide, Perth)
- Country: Australia
- Years active: 2000–2012
- Founded: 2000
- Founder: Fuzzy Operations
- Website: fuzzy.com.au

Parklife Music Festival was an annual national touring music festival held in major cities across Australia. Established in 2000 by the Sydney-based promoter Fuzzy Operations, the festival played a significant role in popularising the "indie-dance" movement in Australia throughout the 2000s.

The festival was traditionally held in late September and early October, marking the start of the Australian summer festival season. In 2013, it was retired and replaced by the boutique touring event Listen Out.

== History ==
=== 2000–2004: Inception and national expansion ===
Parklife debuted in 2000 at Centennial Park in Sydney. Originally conceived as a Sydney-only event, it focused on high-quality electronic music in a "picnic" atmosphere, differentiating itself from the warehouse raves of the era.

Due to its success, the festival expanded into a national tour in the early 2000s, visiting Melbourne, Brisbane, Perth, and Adelaide.

=== 2005–2012: The Indie-Dance era ===
During the mid-to-late 2000s, Parklife became synonymous with the "indie-dance" crossover movement, booking acts that blended live instrumentation with electronic production. Key performers during this period included The Presets, Digitalism, Justice, and M.I.A..

At its peak, the festival was regarded as one of Australia's "big four" touring festivals alongside Big Day Out, Stereosonic, and Future Music Festival.

== Retirement and Listen Out ==
In June 2013, Fuzzy Operations announced that Parklife would be retired. The decision was made to move away from the "large-scale" touring model in favour of a more curated, boutique experience. The successor, Listen Out, was launched the same year with a smaller footprint and a more specific focus on electronic and hip-hop music.

== Notable headliners ==
- 2007: Justice, M.I.A., Digitalism
- 2008: Goldfrapp, 2ManyDJs, Soulwax, Dizzee Rascal
- 2009: Empire of the Sun, Crystal Castles, Tiga, Kaskade, A-Trak
- 2010: Groove Armada, Missy Elliott, 2ManyDJs, The Dandy Warhols, Cut Copy
- 2011: Duck Sauce, The Streets, The Gossip, Lykke Li, Santigold, Death From Above 1979
- 2012: The Presets, Nero, Robyn, Passion Pit, Tame Impala, Justice (DJ set)
