= Party in the Paddock =

Australian music festival

Party In The Paddock
- Genre: Australian, rock, alternative rock, pop, dance, indie rock, hip-hop, electronic,
- Dates: February
- Locations: Carrick, Tasmania, Australia (2013-2020) (2023–)
- Years active: 2013–2020 2023–
- Website: http://www.partyinthepaddockfestival.com.au/

Party In The Paddock is an annual 4-day music festival presented by Vibestown Productions that is held in Carrick, Tasmania, Australia. Their first festival began in 2013 with local acts only.

== Lineups year by year ==
As listed on the official website. Bold indicates headline act. All acts are Australian unless stated otherwise.

== Artist lineups ==
Headline acts highlighted in bold.

=== 2014 ===
- **Kingswood**
- **Sticky Fingers**
- Stonefield
- Sam Simmons
- Thomas Jack
- Kingfisha
- Benjalu
- Bec & Ben
- The Lazys
- Guthrie
- Heloise
- Enola Fall
- Chase City
- The Lyrical
- The Blue Ruins
- The Pretty Littles
- Younger Dryars
- Christopher Coleman Collective
- The Vanns

Lyall Moloney, Big Nothing, The Mornings, Jed Appleton, Pete Cornelius and The Devilles, The Lawless Quartet, The Embers, Zac Slater Trio, Bootleg Rascal, Captives, Lulu & The Paige Turners, Adam Cousens, Dark Matter Of Story Telling, 7th Street Entry, Joseph Joseph, The 88's, The Bone Shack, Ursine, Shanti Dreads

=== 2015 ===
- **The Beautiful Girls**
- **Allday**
- Jinja Safari
- Dune Rats
- The Smith Street Band
- Tommy Franklin
- Willow Beats
- The Delta Riggs
- Dappled Cities
- Luca Brasi
- Little Bastard
- KLP (DJ Set)
- Drunk Mums
- The Dead Love
- Younger Dryas
- The Middle Names
- Akouo
- Save The Clock Tower
- Sheriff
- Lepers & Crooks
- Our House
- The Familiars
- Briggie Smalls

+ more

=== 2016 ===
- **Violent Soho**
- **Spiderbait**
- **The Preatures**
- British India
- Tkay Maidza
- Vallis Alps
- Bad Dreems
- Harts
- Roland Tings
- Tired Lion
- Ecca Vandal
- Nina Las Vegas
- Sleepmakeswaves
- Lurch & Chief
- The Belligerents
- Akouo
- Hockey Dad
- Koi Child
- The Bennies
- Ocean Alley
- The Embers
- Jed Appleton
- Denni
- Dameza
- Kowl

+ more

=== 2017 ===
- **Sticky Fingers**
- **Hermitude**
- **The Smith Street Band**
- **Tash Sultana**
- Paces
- Opiuo
- Remi
- Kim Churchill
- Vera Blue
- Montaigne
- Luca Brasi
- Boo Seeka
- The Bennies
- Sampa the Great
- Skegss
- KLP
- Lyall Moloney
- The Vanns
- Trophy Eyes
- The Pretty Littles
- Gold Member
- Planet
- Guthrie
- PITP Allstars
- Sheriff
- Denni
- Chase City
- Elegant Shiva
- The Saxons
- Sumner
- The Bad Dad Orchestra
- Banquet
- Bad Beef
- Isla Ka
- The Sleepyheads
- Sundaze
- Sofala

=== 2018 ===
- **Grouplove** (USA)
- **Gang Of Youths**
- **The Avalanches (DJ Set)**
- **Meg Mac**
- **Ball Park Music**
- **Client Liaison**
- **The Preatures**
- Thundamentals
- Tkay Maidza
- Mallrat
- Holy Holy
- Aunty Donna
- Crooked Colours
- Kirin J. Callinan
- Tired Lion
- Waax
- 30//70
- Psychedelic Porn Crumpets
- Kinder
- Dear Seattle
- Baker Boy
- Godlands
- POW! Negro
- Slowly Slowly
- Drop Legs
- Younger Dryas
- The Saxons
- Sumner
- Sofala
- The Bad Dad Orchestra
- Slim Jeffries
- Kallidad
- Lincoln Le Fevre
- Angharad Drake
- Lazer Baby
- Sundaze
- Bad Beef
- Bansheeland
- S L O W
- Jack Mclaine & Friends
- King Cake
- Emma Anglesey
- Flxw
- +triple j Unearthed Winner

=== 2019 ===
- **Lily Allen** (UK)
- The Presets
- The Jungle Giants
- Vera Blue
- DZ Deathrays
- Winston Surfshirt
- Middle Kids
- Luca Brasi
- Yungblud (UK)
- Riton & Kah-Lo (UK)
- Remi
- G Flip
- Didirri
- Alex the Astronaut
- Alice Ivy
- Slowly Slowly
- Haiku Hands
- Maddy Jane
- Kwame
- Cable Ties
- Kinder
- Good Doogs
- Adrian Eagle
- Thando
- Tyne-James Organ
- A. Swayze & The Ghosts
- Matt Okine + Gen Fricker
- Drop Legs
- Imbi The Girl
- The Saxons
- Amastro
- Chase City
- Tomgirl
- The Sleepyheads
- Kat Edwards
- Ewah & The Vision Of Paradise
- Seaside
- Stevie Jean
- Hugo Bladel
- Empire Park
- Squeef
- Meres
- Good Lekker
- Bone Shack
- Teens
- Rat Child

=== 2020 ===
- **Matt Corby**
- **Hermitude**
- **Dune Rats**
- **Broods** (NZ)
- Cosmo's Midnight
- Jack River
- Sneaky Sound System
- Briggs
- Mallrat
- Mahalia (UK)
- Lime Cordiale
- Confidence Man
- Odette
- The Chats
- Dear Seattle
- Tora
- I Know Leopard
- Press Club
- These New South Whales
- Arno Faraji
- True Vibenation
- The Dead Love
- Ninajirachi
- The Butlers (NZ)
- Claire Anne Taylor
- The Vanns
- Miiesha
- Bakers Eddy
- Klue
- First Beiege
- Ro
- Batz
- Denni
- Raccoon Dog
- Cool Out Sun
- 100
- The Buoys
- Ant Beard
- Karate Boogaloo
- The Embers
- Isla Ka
- Darvid Thor
- Hurricane Youth
- Jay Jarome Band
- Celeste
- Slaughterhäus Surf Cult
- In the Flowers
- Meg Hitchcock (UK)
- Medhanit
- Mangana Dancers

=== 2023 ===
- Gang of Youths
- DMA'S
- BENEE
- The Presets
- Vera Blue
- Meg Mac
- Genesis Owusu
- Vengaboys
- Yung Gravy
- Methyl Ethel
- Hockey Dad
- Slowly Slowly
- Young Franco
- Bag Raiders (DJ set)
- JK-47
- Peach PRC
- Beddy Rays
- Art vs Science
- Caravana Sun
- Hope D
- Pacific Avenue
- Odd Mob
- Teen Jesus & The Jean Teasers
- Big Twisty & The Funknasty
- Nerve
- Kinder
- Maddy Jane
- Sumner
- Sex On Toast
- Jono Ma
- The Rions
- Carla Geneve
- 1300
- Odd Mob
- Tommy Franklin Dance Aerobics
- Tyler Richardson
- Kat Edwards
- Close Counters (DJ set)
- Jade Zoe
- The Moving Stills
- Seaside
- Denni
- Medhanit
- Squeff
- Jed Appleton Band
- In The Flowers
- Lazer Baby
- Ewah & The Vision of Paradise
- Cyber Switch
- HOLiDAY
- Kudu Joy
- The Saxons
- Queenie
- Zios
- Apricot Ink
- Arunya Lee Olive
- Mere
- Celeste Evelyn
- Miss Kaninna
- Alec Smith
- Suneden & The Seg Street Band
- Isabel Rumble
- Je Bahl
- Slaughterhaus Surf Cult
- Just Flare
- EMA
- World Class Cinema
- Stacy Whale
- Baby Lemur
- Savage Honey
- Lune River
- Thai Swan
- Dirty Motel
- Mortality Trope
- 2 Actual DJs
- Eddy Whitehooves

=== 2024 ===
- Rudimental (UK)
- Milky Chance (EU)
- Tash Sultana
- Ruel
- Lime Cordiale
- G Flip
- The Darkness (UK)
- Hayden James
- Ball Park Music
- Holy Holy
- San Cisco
- K.Flay (USA)
- Chris Lorenzo (UK)
- The Vanns
- Petey (USA)
- Jack River
- Teenage Dads
- The Smith Street Band
- Royel Otis
- The Grogans
- Anna Lunoe
- Kim Churchill
- Barkaa
- The Rions
- CC: Disco!
- Memphis LK
- Big Wett
- The Buoys
- Forest Claudette
- Rum Jungle
- South Summit
- Jacoténe
- Little Fritter
- Wongo
- Willo
- Ben Gerrans
- The Regime
- Jem Cassar-Daley
- 1tbsp
- Battlesnake
- Mincy
- Bec Stevens
- Billy Otto
- Bella Amor
- Lotte Gallagher
- Anesu
- Tanzer
- Djanaba
- Moreton
- Versace Boys
- Chase City
- The Sleepy Heads
- In The Flowers
- Jeqa
- Slim Jeffries
- Lennon Wells
- The Bad Dad Orchestra
- Tasha Zappala
- Uncle Geezer
- The Tinderboxers
- Parker
- Music Mates
- Tony Velvet
- The Seeding
- Laphrodisiac
- Lasca Dry
- Swaz Benjamin
- Bambi O’Hara
- Zandy
- Cathy Diver
- Gay Panic
- Clay Crosier
- Flower Extract
- Bonsai
- Jazzy Faith
- Golden Sunbird
- Morphlink
- The Milk Incident
- The Huskees
- Sam McMeekin
- Luca Brasi
- The Terrys
- DICE
- Kita Alexander
- Moktar
- Maple Glider
- Wildfire Manwurrk
- Denim
- NayNay
- Clover Blue
- Rupert Bullard
- Eliza Bird
- T McGee
- HIJVCKED
- 2 Actual DJ’s
- Charlie Woods
- Changas
- RiVaLu
- VØID
- Will Parks

=== 2025 ===
- Empire of the Sun (AUS)
- AURORA (NOR)
- The Kooks (UK)
- Amyl and the Sniffers (AUS)
- Oliver Tree (USA)
- Still Woozy (USA)
- Role Model (USA)
- Angie McMahon (AUS)
- King Stingray (AUS)
- The Rubens (AUS)
- Thelma Plum (AUS)
- Teen Jesus and the Jean Teasers (AUS)
- Middle Palms (Triple J Unearthed Winners)(AUS)
- Pond (AUS)
- Nina Las Vegas (AUS)
- Willaris. K (AUS)
- Allday (AUS)
- Babe Rainbow (AUS)
- Kobie Dee (AUS)
- Mildlife (AUS)
- Boo Seeka (AUS)
- Sycco (AUS)
- The Dreggs (AUS)
- Slowly Slowly (AUS)
- Medium Build (USA)
- King Mala (USA)
- DICE
- Sam Alfred
- Floodlights
- Full Flower Moon Band
- Mo'Ju
- IN2STELLAR
- Lucille Croft
- Sasquin
- Rā Bellatrix
- Emi Emi
- Glitchcraft
- Princess Drip
- Sumner
- THE VOVOS
- Cool Out Sun
- Bocce
- Evangelo
- The Dolly Parton Experience
- Morality Trope
- Mum And Dad
- Kito
- Jerome Farah
- Radio Free Alice
- Large Mirage
- B. Raymond & The Gold Tones
- Zac Henderson
- Donna Hayze
- John Murray
- Chloe Dadd
- Velvet Trip
- Holiday Mystics
- Wöølworths\Flushot
- The Embers
- Backyard Business
- Rosetntd
- Latifa Tee
- Seaside
- Lasca Dry
- Tai Harlii
- Baz & Grom
- Monny
- Funeral Jeans
- Party Dozen
- Foura
- Dizzy Days
- Grace Chia
- Flow Kobra
- The Southern River Band
- The Beefs
- Blusher
- Surely Shirley
- Gÿps & Spice
- Alec Smith
- Spooky Eyes
- Rivalu
- Kah-Lo
- A. Swayze & The Ghosts
- Mincy
- Queenie
- Ant Enoch
- Powderkeg
- Rupert Bullard
- Tomma
- Ruby Fields
- Playlunch
- LO'99
- Devaura
- Rabbit The Band
- Baltimöre Charlót
- Hunks
- Jimi The Kween

=== 2026 ===
- Sam McMeekin
- Ocean Alley
- Sofi Tukker (USA)
- The Veronicas
- Sophie Ellis-Bextor (UK)
- The Temper Trap
- Flight Facilities
- Peking Duk
- Ball Park Music
- Peach PRC
- Mallrat
- Genesis Owusu
- Baby J (USA)
- Blondshell (USA)
- Dune Rats
- Billie Marten (UK)
- Baker Boy
- Sons of the East
- Old Mervs
- In Hearts Wake
- The Preatures
- Ruby Fields
- The Terrys
- Stüm
- Pretty Girl (DJ Set)
- Ben Lee
- Keli Holiday
- Mansionair
- RedHook
- Jade LeMac (CAN)
- Mia Wray
- Bad//Dreems
- Miss Kaninna
- Harvey Sutherland
- The Belair Lip Bombs
- Rona
- Kaiit
- 3% (group)
- Torren Foot
- Gut Health
- Big Noter
- Baalti (IND)
- Close Counters (DJ Set)
- BVT
- The Pretty Littles
- Sex Mask
- Drifting Clouds
- KSMBA
- Denni
- Hellcat Speedracer
- Radium Dolls
- Medhanit
- Waxx Off
- Bean Magazine
- Gimmy
- Marvell
- O & The Mo
- Lahgo
- Piper Butcher
- Suneden
- Lennon Wells
- Sunshine Brothers
- Turtle Skull
- Afrodisiac
- Krystal Rivvers
- Bonsai
- The Wattles
- Teens
- Powderkeg
- Nice House
- Oscar O'Shea
- L$F
- Tony Velvet
- DJ Dadbod
- Dvrkworld
- Tranquility Unknown
- Dylan Boys
- Holly.etc
- Ekidna
- Q.E.
- Rā Bellatrix
- Hijvckd
- Vivid
- De Leon
- Binga
- Glass Media
- OM3
- Liam Johnston
- Blush
- Kate Rigby
- Willtrax
- Frogs in Suits
- Track + Field
- 2 Hot Bitche$$
- Cosmic Cowgirl

== See also ==
- List of events in Tasmania
