= Wongo (music producer) =

Australian music producer and DJ

Mathew Ladgrove, known professionally as Wongo, is an Australian electronic dance music producer and DJ. He is most known for his song "Groove Society" with Canadian DJ A-Trak Matt is the founder of his own label, 'Box of Cats'. His song 'Fireball' Feat. Rubi Du, peaked at number 5 on the Top 50 Aria Club charts.

== Discography ==
=== Singles ===
List of singles, with year released and album name shown
Title	Year	Album
"Feel Good"	2009	Non-album singles
"Klaxon"	2014	Non-album singles
"Shakin"	2014	Non-album singles
"Maybe Why Not Feat. Cut Snake "	2015	Non-album singles
"HollyWood feat. Nacho Pop"	2015	Non-album singles
"Drop"	2016	Non-album singles
"Be 2 Be"	2016	Non-album singles
"Make It Up"	2016	Non-album singles
"Doin' It/ Fantastic "	2017	Non-album singles
"Crunch"	2017	Non-album singles
"Handle It"	2017	Non-album singles
"Paradise (feat. San Mei)"	2017	Non-album singles
"Sub Circus"	2018	Non-album singles
"Why"	2018	Non-album singles
"Get Moody	2018	Non-album singles
"Robots & Machines"	2018	Non-album singles
"Tic Toc"	2019	Non-album singles
"Caught Up"	2019	Non-album singles
"I'm The DJ feat. Nacho Pop"	2019	Non-album singles
"D.A.D"	2020	Non-album singles
"Shake It"- Billy Kenny (artist)	2020	Non-album singles
"Not For Radio"	2020	Non-album singles
"Real Love (feat. Mia Milla)"	2020	Non-album singles
"Gotta Get Away "	2020	Non-album singles
"Danger Zone"	2020	Non-album singles
"Fireball (feat. Rubi Du)"	2021	Non-album singles
"Not For Radio Pt 2"	2021	Non-album singles
"Groove Society- A-Trak"	2021	Non-album singles
"Love Hotline"	2022	Non-album singles
"Apple (feat. Jade Alice)'"	2022	Non-album singles

=== EPs ===
- Wiggle Out Ep (2009)
- Beat The Game Ep (2015)
- Periodicals (2016)
- Redline Ep (2018)
