= Ran Nir =

Israeli singer-songwriter

Ran Nir רן ניר
- Born: 8 November 1984 (age 42); Jerusalem, Israel
- Genres: Indie pop; folk; rock
- Occupations: Singer-songwriter, musician, producer
- Instruments: Vocals; guitar; bass; keyboard; saxophone
- Years active: 2006–present
- Labels: IMU (I Am You Music Group); Cargo; Clouds Hill
- Formerly of: Asaf Avidan and the Mojos
- Website: www.ran-nir.com

Ran Nir (Hebrew: רן ניר; 8 November 1984) is an Italian–Israeli folk, pop, and alternative singer-songwriter, producer and multi-instrumentalist based in Sweden. He was the bass player and a founding member of the group Asaf Avidan and the Mojos from 2006 to 2011, with which he holds a multi-platinum album for The Reckoning and for the European number-one hit "One Day / Reckoning Song". After the breakup of the Mojos and Asaf Avidan, Nir released music shortly under the name LNFT, from 2012 to 2018, before releasing his debut solo studio album Obsession in 2019, and his second album Greener Pastures in 2022 with Hamburg-based label Clouds Hill. Nir also writes music with and for other artists, as well as producing music and writing score for film.

== Career ==
=== 2006–2011: Asaf Avidan & the Mojos ===
Ran Nir together with Asaf Avidan founded the band Asaf Avidan & the Mojos in 2006. He wrote and co-produced music as well as played bass for the band. The band released three studio albums (The Reckoning, Poor Boy / Lucky Man and Through the Gale), with The Reckoning being certified Gold and Platinum in Israel. The Reckoning's title single became a big success and its remix by German DJ Wankelmut reached No. 1 in more than ten countries. The band also received nominations including MTV Europe Music Award for Best Israeli Act in 2009, Echo Award for Song of the Year 2014, World Music Awards for World's Best Video and World's Best Song for "One Day/Reckoning Song", both in 2014. The band ceased operation in 2011.

=== 2011: The Wrong Demons ===
During 2011, the final year of work with Asaf Avidan & The Mojos, Nir together with drummer Yoni Sheleg and guitarist Roi Peled (ex-Asaf Avidan & The Mojos) released the digital EP In/Between under the band name "The Wrong Demons", where Nir was one of the two lead singers, co-producer, composer, lyricist, bass player and arranger.

=== 2012–2018: LNFT ===
After the cessation of Asaf Avidan and the Mojos, Ran Nir started a rock band called LNFT (Elephant – Live Free Not Troubled) in 2012. The band released their debut album Tales of a Drunken Man that same year, which was named one of the best rock albums of the year in Israel. Nir moved to Berlin, Germany in 2014 as he worked on their second album Time to Bleed, recorded in both Israel and Germany by Nir and Fabien Leseure. The album was released in Israel in 2014 with Nana Disc and later for the rest of the world in 2015 with Cargo Records.

=== 2014–2022: I Am You Music Group (IMU Records) ===
In 2014, Nir together with Andrew Campbell, started the music management company, publishing, booking and record label IMU Records under the name I Am You Music Group in Germany. The record label has released music by musicians like Totemo, ORI, Dan Billu, Sivan Talmor, Bucharest, InAbell, Trace Kotik and Nir's debut album Obsession. After the COVID-19 pandemic the two decided to close the company and pursue different paths.

=== 2019: Obsession ===
Nir released his solo ten-track studio album Obsession in 2019. The album was recorded and produced by Nir and co-producer Erez Frank in Berlin, Germany. The album's title song and single "Obsession" was released with an animated video by Yonatan Ber prior to the album's release.

The album received positive reviews and the title track "Obsession" reached millions of streams, and was used in the soundtrack of the film Ein Nasser Hund, by director Damir Lukačević.

=== 2022: Greener Pastures ===
Nir released his ten-track second studio album Greener Pastures in 2022. The album was recorded and produced by Nir and co-producer Erez Frank in Berlin, Germany. The album was released via the Hamburg-based label Clouds Hill.

The single "I Am with You" reached millions of streams on the different streaming platforms.

== Personal life ==
Ran Nir was born in Jerusalem, Israel. He moved to Berlin, Germany in 2014. He is married to writer and journalist My Amelie Roman Fagerlind, the two have two children.

== Discography ==
=== Asaf Avidan & the Mojos ===
==== Studio albums ====
Title	Album details	Peak chart positions							Sales	Certifications
Title	Album details	AUT	BEL (Fl)	BEL (Wa)	FRA	GER	ITA	SWI	Sales	Certifications
The Reckoning	Released: 2008 (Israel) / 2012 (Europe); Label: Telmavar, Columbia; Formats: CD, digital download	31	91	93	26	23	70	33	ISR: 20,000	IFPI ISR: Gold
Poor Boy / Lucky Man	Released: 2009 (Israel) / 2011 (France); Label: Telmavar, Columbia; Formats: CD, digital download	—	—	—	108	—	—	—		
Through the Gale	Released: 2010 (Israel); Label: Telmavar; Formats: CD, digital download	—	—	—	—	—	—	—		
"—" denotes an album that did not chart or was not released in that territory.

==== Singles ====
Title	Year	Peak chart positions									Certifications	Album
Title	Year	AUT	BEL (Fl)	FRA	GER	ITA	NLD	SWE	SWI	UK	Certifications	Album
"Reckoning Song" (Israel only)	2008	—	—	—	—	—	—	—	—	—		The Reckoning
"Weak" (Israel only)	2008	—	—	—	—	—	—	—	—	—		Non-album singles
"One Day / Reckoning Song" (Wankelmut remix)	2012	1	1	2	1	1	1	1	1	30	Platinum	Non-album singles

=== LFNT ===
==== Albums ====
Title	Album details
Tales of a Drunken Man	Released: 2012 (Israel); Label: LFNT / Nana Disc / IMU; Format: Digital download, CD, vinyl
Time to Bleed	Released: 2014 (Israel), 2015 (rest of the world); Label: LFNT / Nana Disc / Cargo; Format: Digital download, CD, vinyl

=== Ran Nir ===
==== Albums ====
Title	Album details
Obsession	Released: 2019; Label: IMU; Format: Digital download, vinyl
Greener Pastures	Released: 2022; Label: Clouds Hill; Formats: Digital download, vinyl
