= My Head Is a Jungle =

2013 single by Wankelmut and Emma Louise

Single by Wankelmut and Emma Louise

from the album vs Head vs Heart
- Released: 2 January 2013
- Genre: Folktronica; tech house
- Length: 3:33
- Label: Get Physical Music; Poesie Musik; Ego (Italy)
- Songwriters: Emma Louise Lobb; Jacob Dilßner; Taan Newjam
- Producers: Wankelmut; Taan Newjam

Wankelmut singles chronology
"One Day / Reckoning Song (Wankelmut Rmx)" (2012)	"My Head Is a Jungle" (2013)	"Wasted So Much Time" (2014)

Emma Louise singles chronology
"Boy" (2012)	"My Head Is a Jungle" (2013)	"Freedom" (2013)

"My Head Is a Jungle" is a remixed version of Australian singer-songwriter Emma Louise's solo single "Jungle", credited to German producer Wankelmut and Emma Louise. It was released on 2 January 2013 through German label Poesie Musik, a sublabel of Get Physical Music. "My Head Is a Jungle" charted across Europe, having the most success in Italy and the United Kingdom, where it reached number 5.

A remix by MK not released on the original press received airplay in mid-2014, and is more popular by YouTube views than the original.

In January 2022, the song went viral on TikTok as part of the "My Head Is A Jungle" trend, almost 11 years since the release of the original version and 9 years since the Wankelmut remix was released.

== Track listings ==
Digital download / 12" vinyl (Part 1)

1. "My Head Is a Jungle" (Original Mix) – 7:45
2. "My Head Is a Jungle" (Kasper Bjorke's Liquid Lips Remix) – 6:15
3. "My Head Is a Jungle" (Solee Remix) – 8:21

Digital download / 12" vinyl (Part 2)

1. "My Head Is a Jungle" (Extended Vocal Mix) – 6:33
2. "My Head Is a Jungle" (Gui Boratto Remix) – 7:00
3. "My Head Is a Jungle" (Gui Boratto Dub Mix) – 7:32

Digital download (Part 3)

1. "My Head Is a Jungle" (MK Remix) – 8:37
2. "My Head Is a Jungle" (MK Trouble Dub) – 8:44

Italian enhanced CD maxi

1. "My Head Is a Jungle" (Extended Vocal Mix) – 6:33
2. "My Head Is a Jungle" (Original Mix) – 7:45
3. "My Head Is a Jungle" (Gui Boratto Remix) – 7:00
4. "My Head Is a Jungle" (Gui Boratto Dub Mix) – 7:32
5. "My Head Is a Jungle" (Solee Remix) – 8:21
6. "My Head Is a Jungle" (Kasper Bjorke's Liquid Lips Remix) – 6:15
7. "My Head Is a Jungle" (Gui Boratto Remix – Short Edit) – 3:29
8. "My Head Is a Jungle" (Radio Edit) – 3:33
- includes "My Head Is a Jungle" video (3:33)

Digital download (MK Remix)

1. "My Head Is a Jungle" (MK Remix – Radio Edit) – 3:27
2. "My Head Is a Jungle" (Area10 MK Remix – Radio Edit) – 4:30
3. "My Head Is a Jungle" (MK Remix) – 8:39
4. "My Head Is a Jungle" (Area10 MK Remix) – 8:23
5. "My Head Is a Jungle" (My Head Is a Dub MK Remix) – 7:38
6. "My Head Is a Jungle" (MK Trouble Dub) – 8:45

Digital download (The UK Remixes)

1. "My Head Is a Jungle" (Billon Remix) – 5:44
2. "My Head Is a Jungle" (Friend Within Remix) – 7:02
3. "My Head Is a Jungle" (Friend Within Dub) – 7:00

== Charts ==
=== Weekly charts ===
2013–2015 weekly chart performance
Chart (2013–2015)	Peak position
Austria (Ö3 Austria Top 40)	55
Belgium (Ultratop 50 Flanders)	34
CIS Airplay (TopHit)	125
France (SNEP)	80
Germany (GfK)	29
Russia Airplay (TopHit)	143
Ukraine Airplay (TopHit)	75

2026 weekly chart performance
Chart (2026)	Peak position
Russia Streaming (TopHit)	95

MK remix

Chart (2014)	Peak position
Belgium Dance (Ultratop Flanders)	31
Belgium Dance (Ultratop Wallonia)	27
Belgium (Ultratip Bubbling Under Wallonia)	24
Ireland (IRMA)	39
Italy (FIMI)	5
Netherlands (Single Top 100)	68
Poland Dance (ZPAV)	36
Scotland Singles (OCC)	4
Slovakia Singles Digital (ČNS IFPI)	35
Switzerland (Schweizer Hitparade)	35
UK Dance (OCC)	2
UK Singles (OCC)	5

=== Year-end charts ===
Chart (2013)	Position
Italy (FIMI)	16

Chart (2014)	Position
UK Singles (OCC)	80

== Certifications ==
Region	Certification	Certified units/sales
Germany (BVMI)	Gold	150,000^{‡}
Italy (FIMI)	2× Platinum	60,000^{‡}
United Kingdom (BPI)	2× Platinum	1,200,000^{‡}
^{‡} Sales+streaming figures based on certification alone.
