= Dimmi che non passa (EP) =

EP by Violetta Zironi
- Released: 12 December 2013
- Recorded: 2013
- Genre: Pop rock, folk, country pop
- Length: 21:37
- Label: Sony Music
- Producer: Lucio Fabbri, Michele Canova Iorfida

Violetta Zironi chronology
Dimmi che non passa (2013)	Half Moon Lane (2018)

Singles from Dimmi che non passa
- 1. "Dimmi che non passa" Released: 2013

Dimmi che non passa is Violetta Zironi's debut EP, released after the end of season 7 of the Italian version of The X Factor in 2013. It features her first single, title track "Dimmi che non passa", four of the cover songs she performed during the TV show and a classic Italian song of the 1940s called "Ma l'amore no", performed with the sole accompaniment of her ukulele.

The EP peaked at # 13 in the Italian FIMI official chart.

== Track listing ==
1. “Dimmi che non passa” (Christian Lavoro) – 3:21
2. “Let Her Go” (Mike Rosenberg) – 3:22
3. “Friday I'm in Love” (Robert Smith) – 2:41
4. “Le tasche piene di sassi” (Lorenzo Cherubini / Franco Santamecchi) – 3:49
5. “Reckoning Song” (Asaf Avidan) – 2:17
6. “Ma l’amore no” (Giovanni D’Anzi / Michele Galdieri) – 2:44
7. “Dimmi che non passa” (Karaoke version) – 3:23

== Credits ==
All tracks produced and arranged by Lucio Fabbri, except “Le tasche piene di sassi”, produced by Lucio Fabbri, arranged by Lucio Fabbri and Marco Forni; and "Dimmi che non passa" produced by Michele Canova Iorfida. All tracks recorded and mixed at Metropolis Recording Studio by Alessandro Marcantoni, except "Dimmi che non passa" recorded at Sunset Sound Studio 3 by Geoff Neal, mixed at Pinaxa Studio by Pino Pischetola.

== Charts ==
Weekly chart performance for Dimmi che non passa
Chart (2013–14)	Peak position
Italian Albums (FIMI)	13
