= Dimmi che non passa =

Dimmi che non passa may refer to:

- Dimmi che non passa (EP), 2013 EP by Violetta Zironi
- "Dimmi che non passa" (song), 2013 song by Violetta Zironi
