= Violetta Zironi =

Italian singer-songwriter and actress (born 1995)

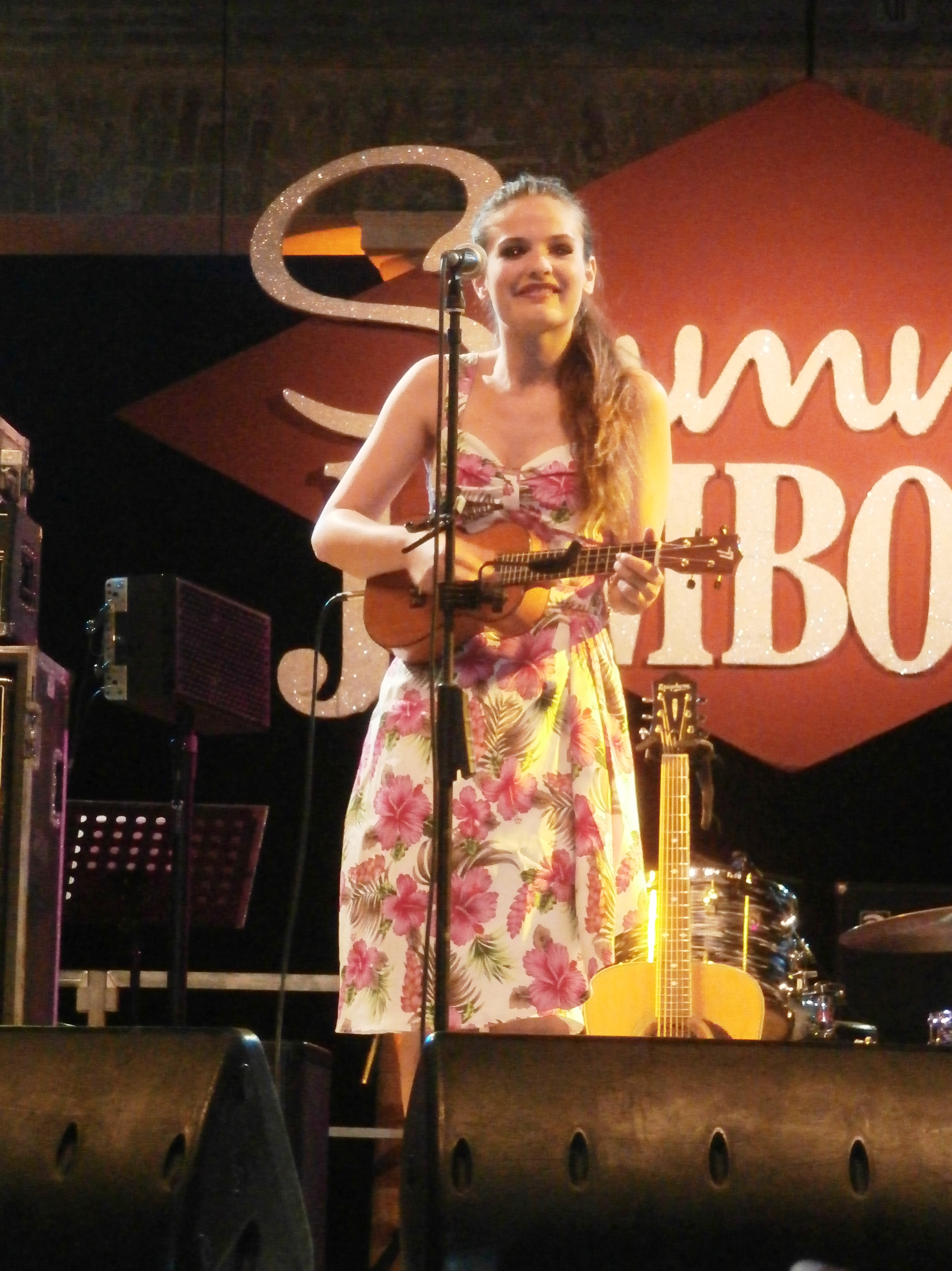
- Zironi performing in 2014

Background information
- Born: 5 April 1995 (age 31); Correggio, Emilia-Romagna, Italy
- Genres: Folk; pop; country
- Occupations: Singer-songwriter; actress
- Instruments: Vocals; guitar; ukulele
- Years active: 2012–present
- Labels: Sony Music (2013–15); Pon't Danic Music (2017–present)
- Website: violettazironi.com

Violetta Zironi (born 5 April 1995) is an Italian singer-songwriter and actress.

In 2013, she took part in season 7 of the Italian version of The X Factor with her ukulele which soon became her signature instrument. She reached the final and finished third. She debuted with her EP Dimmi che non passa, containing her debut single "Dimmi che non passa".

In 2020, she starred in the Netflix's original film Rose Island, directed by Sydney Sibilia.

== Biography ==
=== Early years ===
Violetta Zironi is born in Correggio, Emilia Romagna, to comic book artist and screenwriter Giuseppe Zironi, who worked for Walt Disney Italia, RAI and Mediaset, and municipal clerk Annalisa Sansone. She was first introduced to music aged three, when she joined a local children's choir, before starting taking piano lessons.

Violetta started performing live in her early teens, singing and playing guitar, often accompanied by her father Giuseppe on harmonica and by Oscar Abelli on drums, touring in local festivals and clubs. In 2012, she met ukulele player Luca "Jontom" Tomassini, who introduced Violetta to this instrument. They performed together at the 2012 YOUkulele Festival in Rome, and Jontom wanted Violetta as a guest on his EP Likelike Highway, released by the independent label Insomnia Records.

=== 2013–2014: The X Factor and her first EP ===
In 2013 Violetta showed up at the auditions for season 7 of the Italian version of The X Factor with her ukulele which soon became her signature instrument, and after impressing the judges with her version of "Shortnin' Bread" she was admitted to the live show and included in the "Under 25 Girls" team mentored by Mika. During the live shows, she performed songs such as "Let Her Go" by Passenger, "Le tasche piene di sassi" by Italian popstar Jovanotti, "Friday I'm in Love" by The Cure, "One Day / Reckoning Song" by Asaf Avidan, "Royals" by Lorde, "9 to 5" by Dolly Parton, "Skinny Love" by Birdy and "One" by U2. She finished third place and released her debut EP entitled Dimmi che non passa with Sony Music on 13 December 2013.

In 2014, Violetta was chosen to perform Dorothy Gale's songs in the Italian version of Legends of Oz: Dorothy's Return. On 21 June 2014, she released her second single "Il primo giorno d'estate", written by Luca Mattioni and Mario Cianchi, and produced by Alessandro Magnanini. During the summer, her version of "Bring Me Sunshine" was used for the TV commercial of brand Pavesini.

On 2 August 2014 she performed at the rockabilly festival "Summer Jamboree" in Senigallia, when she opened Ben E. King's show and duet with him performing "Stand By Me".

On 25 November 2014 her version of "Winter Wonderland" was included in the compilation X Factor Christmas 2014, released by Sony Music.

=== 2015–2016: Post-X Factor and Written in Scars Tour ===
In 2015 Violetta's song "Eppure mi va" was included in a shortlist of 60 tracks set to compete in the newcomers section of the Sanremo Music Festival 2015, but didn't make it to the final competition. In April, Violetta guest-starred in Jack Savoretti's Written in Scars Tour, being the opening act of almost all the Italian shows and also joining the singer on stage. She once again took part in the selections for the "Newcomers" section at the Sanremo Music Festival 2016 and again her song "Piccola ferita" was included in the shortlist, but didn't make it to the stage.

On 3 June 2016, she released her third single "Semplice", written and performed together with Italian singer-songwriter Zibba.

=== 2017–2021: Projects in Germany ===
In 2017, she moved to Berlin and signed with label Pon't Danic Music, releasing a new EP entitled Half Moon Lane on 23 February 2018.

On 14 September 2019, she released another EP entitled Scenes from My Lonely Window.

=== 2022: Transition to Web3 ===
In December 2021, at a time when she was considering leaving the music industry, Zironi learned about music NFTs and decided to pursue releasing her music on the Ethereum blockchain. She released her first collection, Handmade Songs, in January 2022 and began hosting regular Twitter spaces about music NFTs.

The success of Handmade Songs encouraged her to release a larger collection. In April 2022, she collaborated with Nifty Music to release Moonshot, a collection of 2500 NFTs featuring five songs written by her and Michael Ochs and produced by Matt Rollings at Sound Emporium Studios in Nashville. The collection also featured artwork drawn by her father, Giuseppe Zironi, who was an illustrator at Walt Disney Studios.

== Discography ==
=== Compilation ===
Year	Album	Details
2019	My Songs	Label: Pon't Danic Music; Formats: LP, CD

=== Extended plays ===
Title	EP details	Peak chart positions	Certifications
Title	EP details	ITA	Certifications
Dimmi che non passa	Released: 13 December 2013; Label: Sony Music; Format: CD, download	13	—
Half Moon Lane	Released: 23 February 2018; Label: Pon't Danic Music; Format: CD, digital download	—	—
Scenes from My Lonely Window	Released: 14 June 2019; Label: Pon't Danic Music; Format: CD, digital download	—	—
Moonshot	Released: April 2022; Label: None; Format: Ethereum NFT	—	—
Handmade Songs	Released: 26 April 2026; Label: None; Format: Digital download	—	—
"—" denotes an item that did not chart in that country.

=== Singles ===
Title	Year	Peak	Album / EP
Title	Year	ITA	Album / EP
"Dimmi che non passa"	2013	6	Dimmi che non passa
"Il primo giorno d'estate"	2014	—	Non-album single
"Semplice" (feat. Zibba)	2016	—	Non-album single
"Don't Make Me a Fool"	2017	—	Half Moon Lane
"Toast"	2017	—	Half Moon Lane
"One More Goodbye"	2018	—	Scenes from My Lonely Window
"Little Wound" (feat. Ed Prosek)	2018	—	Scenes from My Lonely Window
"Lonely Window"	2019	—	Scenes from My Lonely Window
"Oasis"	2019	—	Scenes from My Lonely Window
"When I Wake"	2019	—	My Songs
"Hungry to Kill"	2019	—	My Songs
"I Never Needed Christmas"	2020	—	Non-album single
"When You're Not Around"	2021	—	Non-album single
"Poor Millionaire"	2021	—	Non-album single
"Come What May" (with Ed Prosek)	2021	—	Non-album single
"10 Years"	2023	—	Non-album single
"Heavenly Angels"	2023	—	Non-album single
"A Little Rain Must Fall"	2026	—	Handmade Songs
"Gypsy Heart"	2026	—	Non-album single
"Blaze of Glory"	2026	—	Non-album single
"—" denotes an item that did not chart.

=== Other charted songs ===
Title	Year	Peak	Album / EP
Title	Year	ITA	Album / EP
"Let Her Go"	2013	81	Dimmi che non passa

=== Guest appearances ===
Year	Artist	EP	Contribution
2012	Jontom	Likelike Highway	Vocals and acoustic guitar on "Jackson", "Ghost" and "Wherever I Go"

Singles as featured artist
Title	Year	Main Artist(s)	Peak	Album / EP
"Wherever You Go" (feat. Violetta Zironi)	2020	Jewelz & Sparks	—	Non-album single
"Donna" (feat. Violetta Zironi)	2021	Turista Per Sempre	—	Non-album single
"Donna" (Boris Meinhold Remix)	2023	Turista Per Sempre	—	Non-album single
_{"—" denotes an item that did not chart.}

=== Other appearances in compilation albums ===
Year	Song(s)	Album
2013	"Dimmi che non passa"	X Factor Compilation 2013
2013	"Le tasche piene di sassi"	X Factor Compilation 2013
2014	"Winter Wonderland"	X Factor Christmas 2014

=== Music videos ===
Year	Title	Director	Ref.
2013	"Dimmi che non passa"	Tom Summers	
2014	"Il primo giorno d'estate"		
2017	"Half Moon Lane"	Elisabeth Damke	
2017	"Don't Make Me a Fool"	John Bird	

== Filmography ==
Film
Year	Title	Role	Notes
2018	Il flauto magico di Piazza Vittorio	Pamina	
2020	Rose Island	Franca	
2022	Io e Spotty	Sissi	

== Awards and nominations ==
Year	Award	Nomination	Work	Result
2014	Kid's Choice Awards	Best Italian Act	Herself	Nomination
