= Lilac Everything =

Studio album by Emma Louise
- Released: 14 September 2018
- Studio: Bear Creek Studio, Seattle
- Label: Liberation
- Producer: Tobias Jesso Jr.

Emma Louise chronology
Supercry (2016)	Lilac Everything (2018)	Dumb (2025)

Singles from Lilac Everything
- 1. "Wish You Well" Released: 15 June 2018; 2. "Mexico" Released: 22 July 2018; 3. "Falling Apart" Released: 27 August 2018

Lilac Everything (subtitled A Project by Emma Louise) is the third studio album by Australian singer Emma Louise, released on 14 September 2018. The album peaked at number 143 on the ARIA Charts.

Lilac Everything was written by Louise during a visit to Mexico and recorded at Bear Creek Studio in Seattle with Tobias Jesso Jr. The album marks Jesso Jr.'s first time working as a producer.

During the final moments of recording, Louise asked Jesso Jr. to dramatically pitch all of her vocals down, with Louise saying: "It was honestly the most relieving decision I've ever made, musically. It just felt so right. I didn't even have to think about it. It made the album swell. It expanded. I think, creatively, I was able to do whatever I wanted."

Louise toured the album across Australia in September 2019.

At the AIR Awards of 2019, Lilac Everything was nominated for Best Independent Album.

== Singles ==
"Wish You Well" was released as the lead single on 15 June 2018, the same day as the album was announced. The song was described as "dramatic" by Amnplify and "bold" by ABC.

"Mexico" was released on 22 July 2018 as the album's second single. The track shares the same title as the birthplace for the album.

"Falling Apart" was released on 27 August 2018, complete with a live video. Emma Louise said "'Falling Apart' was the last song I wrote for the album. I was having a lot of conflicting feelings and went to a friend's party. I arrived too early and they had a piano. I wrote the song and then left before anyone arrived."

== Reception ==
Professional ratings
Review scores
Source	Rating
The Music	3.5/5 stars

Keira Leonard from The Music said: "The change in pitch on Lilac Everything is so extreme that Emma Louise is unrecognisable from her past works; as we hear a far more androgynous vocal style rather than the feminine, higher pitch we're familiar with." Leonard also wrote that "Once you get over the initial confusion of such a drastic change, you're in for one emotionally immersive ride. And immersed you will be, as the hypnotic Louise sings her poignant, universally-felt tales; making it a brave, gripping and influential release."

Shaad D'Souza from Vice said "Lilac Everything bears no resemblance to vs Head vs Heart or Supercry whatsoever; rather than looking to electronics or alt-pop, Lilac Everything trades in wide, earthy soul and spare, romantic folk music, not entirely dissimilar in colour to Feist's Let It Die... The phrase 'radical departure' is overused and meaningless, so to put it plainly: Lilac Everything sounds nothing like Emma Louise."

Happy Mag called the album "her most spellbinding work to date".

Women in Pop said: "The altered vocals bring previously unheard qualities and timbres to Emma Louise's voice, and are in many ways the perfect complement to the threads of melancholy that wind through the album." adding "Lilac Everything isn't your typical pop release, and is miles away from Emma Louise's previous electro-tinged releases, but it is perhaps because of that it is such a special release - pop music as art in the most engaging and moving way possible."

== Track listing ==
No.	Title	Writer(s)	Length
1.	"Wish You Well"	Emma Louise Lobb	4:10
2.	"Falling Apart"	Lobb; Blessed Samuel Joe-Andah; Jonathan Visger; Kosuke Edward Kasza	3:15
3.	"Just The Way I Am"	Lobb	3:33
4.	"Never Making Plans Again"	Lobb	3:40
5.	"Gentleman"	Lobb	3:39
6.	"Shadowman"	Lobb; Tobias Jesso Jr.	3:42
7.	"Solitude"	Lobb; Jimmie Kirkpatrick	1:48
8.	"Mexico"	Lobb	4:11
9.	"A Book Left Open in a Wild Field of Flowers"	Lobb	3:54
10.	"When It Comes to You"	Lobb	4:02

== Charts ==
Chart (2018)	Peak position
Australian Albums (ARIA)	143

== Release history ==
Region	Date	Format	Label	Catalogue
Various	14 September 2018	CD; digital download; streaming	Liberation Records	LRCD0004
Australia	14 September 2018	LP	Liberation Records	LRLP0004
