= Tamar Eisenman =

Israeli musical artist

Tamar Eisenman תמר אייזנמן
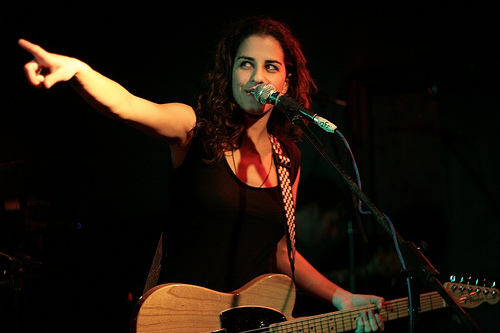

Background information
- Born: July 2, 1980 (age 45); Jerusalem
- Genres: Folk, rock, blues, pop
- Occupations: Singer, songwriter, guitarist, producer
- Instruments: Guitar, vocals, bass guitar
- Years active: 2001–present
- Labels: Zipi's Baby, NMC Music, Odacity
- Website: www.eisenwoman.com

Tamar Eisenman (Hebrew: תמר אייזנמן; born July 2, 1980) is a blues-folk-rock guitarist, singer, songwriter and producer, born in Jerusalem.

Eisenman launched her musical career in 2003 in Israel with the release of her self-titled EP "Tamar Eisenman EP". She later released studio albums. – "5 feet 4, Gymnasium", "Time for Creation", and "Limbo". In 2010 Eisenman opened for Jeff Beck in Caesarea amphitheater and initiated several new projects as guitarist and producer. Eisenan also recorded and performed with Danny Sanderson, Asaf Avidan, Miki Gavrielov, David Broza, and Kaki King. Eisenman is mainly known for her acoustic guitar handpicking electric guitar sound integrated with her bluesy pop songwriting.

== Early life ==
Eisenman was born in Jerusalem and spent part of her childhood with her family in San Francisco, where she started playing the guitar at the age of six. At the age of twelve, Tamar started taking guitar lessons with Aharoni Ben Ari focusing on blues and jazz. A few years later she started writing her first songs and playing with local bands, as well as participating in the project for young bands in Jerusalem at the Yellow Submarine

== Musical career ==
At the age of twenty, Eisenman started performing with other musicians as a lead guitarist and musical producer. At the same time, she released her self-produced EP in 2003, established her trio, and began performing with her own repertoire. In 2005, eisenman released her full-length album, "5 feet 4" – her height in shoes – including 15 songs written and composed by herself and produced by Amir Ben Ami (Hadag Nachash). In 2006, Tamar joined the Danny Sanderson band as guitarist and vocalist. A year later she moved to Tel Aviv and joined The Tonight Band of Lior Schleien’s late night TV Tonight ("Ha Layla"), an Israeli version of The Tonight Show, which won the Israeli Academy Award for Best Talk Show.

In 2009, after signing to NMC Music Eisenman released her first single from Gymnasium, her 3rd album. "Hit Me" was her first national radio hit. Following her second radio hit Sun, she released her 3rd album and toured constantly across Israel and in venues and festivals around the world. CMJ festival (NY) Sappho festival (Greece), Bam Café (NY), The Water Rats (London) and was chosen to open for Jeff Beck in Caesarea.

In 2011, Eisenman released her 4th album "Time for Creation", which included 12 tracks mixed by Tamir Muskat. Later that year she musically produced a tribute concert in Tel Aviv celebrating Bob Dylan's 70th birthday.

In August 2015 Eisenman released her latest album "Limbo". Her first full album in Hebrew included songs written by Yankale Rotblit and David Avidan. The duet version "Tam" was recorded with musician and singer Rona Kenan.

In 2017 the "On My Way" compilation album was released worldwide. In 2018 Eisenman won an Israeli Emmy nomination for best original score for the soundtrack to the documentary "רמטכ"לים".

== Personal life ==
As of 2022 she is living in New York City with a female partner and they are raising a child.

== Discography ==
Studio Albums

- 2017 – רמטכ"לים Soundtrack
- 2017 – On My Way (Odacity, Magenta, NMC Music))
- 2015 – Limbo/לימבו (Zipis Baby, NMC Music)
- 2011 – Time for Creation (Zipis Baby, NMC Music)
- 2009 – Gymnasium (Zipis Baby, NMC Music)
- 2005 – 5 Feet 4 (Zipis Baby, The Eighth note)
- 2003 – Tamar Eisenman EP (Zipi's Baby)

Additional projects and collaborations

- 2017 – אריק ברמן, אהבה ואלוהים אחרים (Music production)
- 2016 – Coincidence, Ronen Green (Music production)
- 2015 – Mama Blues, J-Town girl, Give Me Words / "Rage against The Eclipse", Hadara Levin Areddy (guitars and music production)
- 2013 – Puzzle, Ronen Green (Guitars, vocals, music production)
- 2012 – בלדה לאישה Israeli women singers anthology 1940 –2011 ( "2 Step Dance")
- 2012 – מסע בלוז איתי פרל Itay Pearl (Guitar)
- 2012 – Sunrise, Amit Friedman Sextet (Vocals)
- 2010 – לא חברה, Movie by Sivan ben Ari. Soundtrack
- 2009 – Lo Yafrid Davar/לא יפריד דבר Danny Sanderson (Guitars, vocals)
- 2008 – משחקי פחד Ido Mosseri (Guitars)
- 2008 – סוג של ורוד Tamar Giladi (Guitars)
- 2008 – The Reckoning, Asaf Avidan
- 2007 – שאנן סטריט, הבזק אור חולף (Vocals)
- 2007 – Rock Rimon, 84 Steps theme song for TV show
- 2007 – Stefan Braun\סטפן בראון, Movie by Itamar Alkalay. Soundtrack (Guitars, programming)
- 2007 – חוטים, Ronit Rolland (Guitars and co-arrangements/musical producer)
- 2006 – Now that You're leaving" Ep, Asaf Avidan (Guitars, bass, vocals, co-arrangements)
- 2002 – Magic Time, Hadara Levin Areddy (Guitars)
- 2002 – King O, Hadara Levin Areddy (Guitars)
- 2001 – Live at Tmuna Theater, Hadara Levin Areddy (Guitars)
- 2001 – This Is a True Story/ The Rough Cut, Hadara Levin Areddy (Guitars)
