= Wankelmut =

German DJ and producer (born 1987)

- Born: Jacob Dilßner; 17 July 1987 (age 38)
- Origin: Friedrichshain, East Berlin, East Germany
- Genres: Electronica; house; trip hop
- Occupations: DJ; record producer; record label owner
- Years active: 2011–present
- Website: wankelmut.com

Jacob Dilßner (born 17 July 1987), better known by his stage name Wankelmut, is a German electronic music DJ and record producer based in Berlin. He rose to fame internationally through the remix hit "One Day / Reckoning Song (Wankelmut Remix)".

== Career ==
=== Early beginnings ===
Dilßner lived in Friedrichshain, a Berlin borough. He studied at Georg-Herwegh-Oberschule and followed piano lessons. He enrolled for university studies picking Philosophy and Political Science and while studying, did DJing on a part-time basis at various Berlin venues, notably Sisyphos and M.I.K.Z. . He chose the name Wankelmut, a German term for "fickleness" describing his music as "fickle music, diverse and multi-faceted".

=== 2012: "One Day / Reckoning Song" ===
His fame came with his remix of Asaf Avidan & The Mojos song "Reckoning Song" that he heard during a visit to the United States. In winter 2011, he remixed it with Ableton Live, cutting, filtering and adding a simple 4/4 groove to the song into "One Day / Reckoning Song (Wankelmut Rmx)" adding it to his SoundCloud account. The remix went viral through support by various blogs and playing of the remix in various clubs all over Europe. After being approached by a number of labels, it was released by Four Music, who already held the rights to the original song by Asaf Avidan & the Mojos. It became one of house music's biggest hits of 2012, internationally topping the charts in many European countries including Germany. An official music video was released as well. In 2012, he was nominated for "best single" for the song at 1 Live Krone and in 2013 was nominated for "Hit of the Year (national and international)" at the 2013 Echo Awards.

=== 2013–present: "My Head Is a Jungle" ===
Wankelmut put his university studies on hold as he engaged on a pan-European tour. He also worked on various remixes for his first proper solo-release, a remix of "Jungle", a song from Emma Louise. The remix release under the title "My Head Is a Jungle" credits Wankelmut & Emma Louise. While on holiday in Australia in January 2013, Dilßner spontaneously played a free show, stating: "I’ve made enough money in Europe recently. I’ve had huge support from fans in Melbourne and I’d like to play a show for them. Get me two CDJs and a mixer and I’ll make a party."

In 2022 Wankelmut released an educational masterclass showing how he creates his music and giving career advice to aspiring producers.

== Discography ==
=== Extended plays ===
Title	Details
Wood & Wine	Released: January 17, 2014; Label: Get Physical Music; Formats: Digital download
Sirens	Released: August 15, 2016; Label: Get Physical Music; Formats: Digital download

=== Mixes ===
Title	Details
Wankelmoods Vol. 1	Released: November 2, 2012; Label: Get Physical Music; Formats: Digital download
Wankelmoods Vol. 2	Released: June 6, 2014; Label: Get Physical Music; Formats: Digital download

=== Singles ===
Year	Title	Peak chart positions											Certifications	Album
Year	Title	GER	AUT	BEL	DEN	FRA	ITA	NL	NOR	SWE	SWI	UK	Certifications	Album
2012	"One Day / Reckoning Song (Wankelmut Remix)"	1	1	1	2	2	1	1	4	8	1	30	BEL: Platinum; DEN: Gold; ITA: 4× Platinum	The Reckoning
2013	"My Head Is a Jungle" (with Emma Louise)	29	55	34	—	80	5	68	—	—	35	5	BPI: 2× Platinum; ITA: 2× Platinum	vs Head vs Heart
2014	"Wasted So Much Time" (featuring John Lamonica)	—	—	—	—	—	—	—	—	—	—	—		Non-album single
2017	"Almost Mine" (with Charlotte OC)	—	—	—	—	—	—	—	—	—	—	—		Non-album single
2018	"Work of Art" (with Alexander Tidebrink)	—	—	—	—	—	—	—	—	—	—	—		Non-album single
"—" denotes a single that did not chart or was not released in that territory.
