= Dumb (album) =

Studio album by Emma Louise and Flume
- Released: 22 August 2025
- Length: 32:12
- Label: Flume
- Producer: Flume

Emma Louise chronology
| Lilac Everything (2018) | Dumb (2025) |

Flume chronology
| We Live in a Society (2025) | Dumb (2025) |

Singles from Dumb
- 1. "Easy Goodbye" Released: 18 July 2025; 2. "Shine, Glow, Glisten" Released: 1 August 2025; 3. "Monsoon" Released: 22 August 2025

Dumb (stylised in all caps) is a collaborative studio album by Australian singer-songwriter Emma Louise and Australian electronic musician Flume. The album was announced on 18 July 2025 alongside its lead single and released on 22 August 2025.

Upon announcement, Louise said: "The title Dumb is loaded with weight for me... At first, naming the album Dumb felt irreverent and freeing, but later I realised how deeply it connected to my own fear of being seen as stupid and unworthy. This album is me reclaiming that word, letting go of shame, and promising myself I'll never abandon my voice again."

Flume and Louise previously collaborated on the 2022 single "Hollow", from Flume's third studio album Palaces.

At the 2025 ARIA Music Awards, the album was nominated for Best Engineered Release.

== Singles ==
The lead single "Easy Goodbye" was released on 18 July 2025. HappyMag TV described it as "Stunning, cinematic and emotionally grounded – a raw story of neurodivergence, vulnerability and self-acceptance wrapped in genre-defying electronica. A bold, beautiful start to a deeply personal album that promises to challenge, comfort, and spark some serious inner reflection."

"Shine, Glow, Glisten" was released on 1 August 2025 alongside its video, directed by Jonathan Zawada.

"Monsoon" was released on 22 August 2025, with its music video being directed by Jonathan Zawada and Michael Hili.

== Track listing ==
All tracks are written by Emma Louise Lobb and Harley Streten.

Dumb track listing
| No. | Title | Length |
|---|---|---|
| 1. | "All of the Worlds" | 2:06 |
| 2. | "Monsoon" | 2:51 |
| 3. | "Shine, Glow, Glisten" | 3:10 |
| 4. | "Feel Ur Love" | 4:12 |
| 5. | "Easy Goodbye" | 4:14 |
| 6. | "Stay" | 3:06 |
| 7. | "Whenever You Want" | 2:31 |
| 8. | "Homicide" | 3:55 |
| 9. | "Brand New" | 3:44 |
| 10. | "Truce" | 2:23 |
| Total length: | | 32:12 |

== Personnel ==
Credits adapted from Tidal.

- Emma Louise – vocals
- Flume – production
- Eric J Dubowsky – mixing
- Matt Curtin – mix assistant
- Matt Colton – mastering

== Charts ==
Chart performance for Dumb
| Chart (2025) | Peak position |
|---|---|
| Australian Artist Albums (ARIA) | 11 |
