= Gold Shadow =

Studio album by Asaf Avidan
- Released: 12 January 2015 (physical); 22 January 2015 (downloads)
- Recorded: 2013–2014
- Genre: Folk rock, blues rock, indie rock
- Label: Telmavar Records / Columbia (Israel); Polydor-Universal Music (Europe)

Asaf Avidan chronology
Different Pulses (2012)	Gold Shadow (2015)	The Study on Falling (2017)

Singles from Gold Shadow
- 1. "Over My Head"; 2. "Little Parcels of an Endless Time"; 3. "Gold Shadow"

Gold Shadow is the second solo studio album of Israeli artist Asaf Avidan after his first album entitled Different Pulses. The album containing 12 tracks was released on 12 January 2015 in Israel on Telmavar Records and in Europe on Polydor-Universal Music and on iTunes and Amazon on January 22, 2015.

== Track list ==
1. "Over My Head" (2:37)
2. "Ode to My Thalamus" (3:38)
3. "The Jail That Sets You Free" (3:18)
4. "Little Parcels of an Endless Time" (3:25)
5. "My Tunnels Are Long and Dark These Days" (4:32)
6. "Gold Shadow" (4:30)
7. "Let's Just Call It Fate" (3:12)
8. "These Words You Want to Hear" (3:27)
9. "A Part of This" (3:42)
10. "Bang Bang" (3:23)
11. "The Labyrinth Song" (4:08)
12. "Fair Haired Traveller" (4:11)

== Charts ==
=== Weekly charts ===
Chart (2015)	Peak position
Belgian Albums (Ultratop Flanders)	102
Belgian Albums (Ultratop Wallonia)	24
French Albums (SNEP)	3
German Albums (Offizielle Top 100)	75
Swiss Albums (Schweizer Hitparade)	12

=== Year-end charts ===
Chart (2015)	Position
Belgian Albums (Ultratop Wallonia)	197
French Albums (SNEP)	62
