= Il primo giorno d'estate =

- Cover art for "Il primo giorno d'estate" single

Single by Violetta Zironi
- Released: 21 June 2014
- Recorded: 2014
- Genre: Pop
- Length: 3:20
- Label: Sony Music
- Songwriters: Luca Mattioni and Mario Cianchi
- Producer: Alessandro Magnanini

Violetta Zironi singles chronology
"Dimmi che non passa" (2013)	"Il primo giorno d'estate" (2014)	"Semplice" (2016)

Music video
- "Il primo giorno d'estate" on YouTube

"Il primo giorno d'estate" (lit. 'The first day of summer') is the second single by Violetta Zironi released on 21 June 2014. The song was released for digital download only and up to date never made its appearance in any album or EP.

== Writing and recording ==
Music and lyrics to the song were written by Italian songwriters Luca Mattioni and Mario Cianchi. The track is basically a pop song with lyrics and atmosphere recalling the typical lightheartedness of summer.

== Music video ==
The music video was shot in Marina di Ravenna, Italy in June 2014. From her Facebook page, Violetta's fans were offered to take part in the shooting of the video which took place mostly at the "Hana Bi" beach and in other locations of the small sea town. The video was officially released on 4 July 2014.

== Live performances ==
To date the song was performed live only once, during Violetta's show at "Galleria Porta di Roma" in Rome. In that occasion Violetta performed the song with the sole accompaniment of an acoustic guitar.
