= Full Hearts & Empty Rooms =

EP by Emma Louise
- Released: 15 April 2011
- Length: 15:03
- Label: Emma Louise (independent); MGM
- Producer: Mark Myers (Note: All tracks)

Emma Louise chronology
Autumn Tongues (2008)	Full Hearts & Empty Rooms (2011)	vs Head vs Heart (2013)

Emma Louise EP chronology
Autumn Tongues (2008)	Full Hearts & Empty Rooms (2011)

Singles from Full Hearts & Empty Rooms
- 1. "Jungle" Released: 5 March 2011

Full Hearts & Empty Rooms is the second extended play by Australian recording artist Emma Louise, released independently through Louise's Bandcamp on 31 March 2011.

The EP was later released independently on compact disc on 15 April 2011, with distribution handled by MGM Records.

Full Hearts & Empty Rooms achieved minor critical and commercial success, debuting and peaking at number 93 on the ARIA Albums Chart and attaining a platinum certification, and receiving the award for Best Independent Single/EP at the 2011 AIR Awards.

== Recording ==
Full Hearts & Empty Rooms was recorded with Mark Myers, who produced and engineered the EP, whilst Matt Redlich mastered the tracks.

== Critical reception ==
Professional ratings
Review scores
Source	Rating
The AU Review	8/10 stars

Kat Mahina from The AU Review said: "Full Hearts & Empty Rooms is a striking debut from a talented artist who is bound to make waves around the nation this year with her pretty, uncomplicated pop. Emma Louise wears her heart firmly on her sleeve. Now would be a good time to jump on board her band wagon."

== Commercial performance ==
Full Hearts & Empty Rooms debuted and peaked at number 93 on the ARIA Albums Chart for the chart dated 19 October 2011. The EP was later certified gold on 30 September 2012.

== Awards and nominations ==
=== AIR Awards ===
Year	Nominee / work	Award	Result	Ref.
2011	Herself	Best Breakthrough Independent Artist	Won	
2011	Full Hearts & Empty Rooms	Best Independent Single/EP	Nominated	

== Track listing ==
Full Hearts & Empty Rooms track listing
No.	Title	Writer(s)	Producer(s)	Length
1.	"Bugs"	Emma Louise	Mark Myers	3:52
2.	"Jungle"	Louise	Myers	3:22
3.	"Al's Song"	Louise	Myers	3:20
4.	"1000 Sundowns"	Louise	Myers	4:29
Total length:				15:03

== Personnel ==
Adapted from the EP's liner notes.

=== Musicians ===
- Emma Louise – writing, vocals, guitar (1–4)

Other musicians

- Mark Myers – bass, guitar, keys (1–4)
- Daniel Ogilvie – drums, percussion (1–4)

=== Technical ===
- Mark Myers – production, engineering (1–4)
- Matt Redlich – mastering (1–4)

=== Artwork ===
- Mel Baxter at Moonshine Madness – design, artwork

== Charts ==
Chart performance for Full Hearts & Empty Rooms
Chart (2011)	Peak position
Australia (ARIA Charts)	93

== Certifications ==
Certifications for Full Hearts & Empty Rooms
Region	Certification	Certified units/sales
Australia (ARIA)	Platinum	70,000^{^}
^{^} Shipments figures based on certification alone.

== Release history ==
Release history and formats for Full Hearts & Empty Rooms
Region	Date	Format	Label	Catalogue	Ref.
Australia	31 March 2011	Digital download	Emma Louise (independent)	Not applicable	
Australia	15 April 2011	CD; digital download	Emma Louise (independent); MGM	EL002	
