= Talk Baby Talk =

2016 single by Emma Louise

Single by Emma Louise

from the album Supercry
- Released: 18 March 2016
- Length: 3:14
- Label: Liberation Music
- Songwriter(s): Emma Louise
- Producer(s): Pascal Gabriel

Emma Louise singles chronology
"Underflow" (2015)	"Talk Baby Talk" (2016)	"West End Kids" (2016)

Music video
- "Talk Baby Talk" on YouTube

"Talk Baby Talk" is a song by Australian singer Emma Louise, released on 18 March 2016 as the second single from Emma Louise's second studio album Supercry.

Emma Louise said "'Talk Baby Talk' is a song about a lack of communication in a relationship. Lots of things left unsaid calls for lots of room in the mind to make stories. There is a lot of tension and frustration in the song. I couldn't express my feelings and thoughts to someone so I ended up bottling it up and it came out as this song."

== Music video ==
The music video was directed by Dylan Duclos and premiered on 31 March 2016. The music video illustrates a narrative featuring a troubled couple, with Emma Louise cutting a striking figure throughout. Dylan Duclos said "When I first heard 'Talk Baby Talk', there was something implicitly brooding about it and that was something I wanted to explore visually. Emma came to me with a loose idea of what she wanted to do and from there, we went back and forth until we were happy with what we had."

== Reception ==
Sosefina Fuamoli from The AU Review said "Emma's vocals haunt on the track, floating over an irresistible groove and production that will have you hooked from the onset" and showing "her writing chops once more".

Liam Apter from Pilerats said "With the 808 drums hidden in the background of the song it oozes a sensuality that comes alive when Emma Louise sings, 'Why can't we just talk about it / We used to be such good friends'." Apter called the song "beautiful".

Alexander Kelly from Best Before said "The harrowing track centres on simple drum snaps and subtle layers of harrowing guitars, eventually flourishing in the most robotic of ways, with siren-like synths ensnaring and pulsating through her immaculate vocal displays."
