= Boy (Emma Louise song) =

2012 single by Emma Louise

Single by Emma Louise

from the album vs Head vs Heart
- Released: 7 June 2012
- Length: 4:32
- Label: Emma Louise
- Songwriter(s): Emma Louise
- Producer(s): Pascal Gabriel

Emma Louise singles chronology
"It's Only Natural" (2011)	"Boy" (2012)	"My Head Is a Jungle" (2013)

Music video
- "Boy" on YouTube

"Boy" is a song by Australian singer Emma Louise, released on 7 June 2012 as the lead single from Emma Louise's debut studio album vs Head vs Heart.

The song won the Emma Louise the award for Most Popular Female at the 2013 Queensland Music Awards.

== Music video ==
The music video premiered on 19 June 2012 It was produced and directed by Alex Barnes and Silver Screen Pictures.

== Reception ==
Natalie Salvo from Life Music Media opined it sat "somewhere between the pleasant, classic pop of Fleetwood Mac and the interesting layers that peppered Pajama Club's sound" with music that "accentuates Louise’s amazing and versatile voice."

Beat Magazine said "Boy is a warm, low-key tune with a dense landscape of synth notes and a metronomic rhythm" before calling the song "nice."

Purple Sneakers said "It's a song you can't help but fall in love with" saying "Her hushed vocal tones have the presence of Florence and the Machine and the delicacy of Bat For Lashes."
