= Underflow (song) =

2015 single by Emma Louise

Single by Emma Louise

from the album Supercry
- Released: 7 November 2015
- Length: 3:37
- Label: Liberation Music
- Songwriter(s): Emma Louise
- Producer(s): Pascal Gabriel

Emma Louise singles chronology
"Two Bodies" (2014)	"Underflow" (2015)	"Talk Baby Talk" (2016)

Music video
- "Underflow" on YouTube

"Underflow" is a song by Australian singer Emma Louise, released on 7 November 2015 as the lead single from Emma Louise's second studio album Supercry.

Emma Louise said "I wrote 'Underflow' about a feeling of knowing that a change is about to come. This feeling was bubbling up inside me. I knew that with the change would be both good and bad things. It’s about moving forward and accepting change. Whether it be the end of a relationship or the start of another exciting journey."

The song placed second at the 2016 Vanda & Young Global Songwriting Competition.

== Music video ==
The music video premiered on 14 December 2015. Shot by Dylan Duclos, who said "Working with Emma was great. To collaborate with an artist who has such a clear direction in terms of her aesthetic and image was really cool and proved such a smooth process."

== Reception ==
The Music said "[it] is an atmospheric, almost-haunting composition, at once both lush and starkly minimal, with the lyrics and music having come from a demonstrably personal place".

Lauren Ziegler from Indie Shuffle called the song "stunning" and "heartbreaking" saying "The instrumental layers see delicate, muffled piano trickles meeting an ambient, emotive soundscape. There's a real delicacy, a real vulnerability in Louise's breathy voice - I feel immediately, wholly enveloped by her melody and her lyrics. I'm hooked."

== Track listings ==
Digital download

1. "Underflow" - 3:37

Digital download

1. "Underflow" (Little Dragon Remix) - 4:52

Digital download

1. "Underflow" (Yeo Remix) - 4:52
