= Through the Gale =

Studio album by Asaf Avidan & the Mojos
- Released: 2010 (Israel)
- Recorded: 2009–2010
- Label: Telmavar Records (Israel)

Asaf Avidan & the Mojos chronology
Poor Boy / Lucky Man (2009)	Through the Gale (2010)

Through the Gale is the third album of Asaf Avidan & the Mojos in Israel released in 2010 independently after the success of their debut 2008 album The Reckoning and the follow-up 2009 album Poor Boy / Lucky Man.

== Track list ==
1. "Hoist Up the Colors!"
2. "Through the Gale"
3. "The Sirens & the Sea"
4. "At the Edge of the Map"
5. "Sailors Are We"
6. "Poseidon's Fury Unleashed"
7. "Oh Western Wind"
8. "Turn of the Tides Under the Northern Lights"

== Credits ==
- All songs written and composed by Asaf Avidan.
- Arranged by Asaf Avidan & the Mojos and Ori Winokur.
- Produced by Ori Winokur and Asaf Avidan.
- Recorded by – Ronen Hajaj at Ogen Studio
- Ogen assistant engineers – Yair Nisimov, Shlomi Gvili, Sharon Inbar
- Mixed by – Ronen Hajaj on the road in different hotel rooms
- Summing at Pluto Studios
- Mastered by Alan Ward at Electric City Mastering

Instruments

- Asaf Avidan – Vocals, Guitar
- Hadas Kleinman – Cello
- Ran Nir – Bass
- Roi Peled – Guitar
- Yoni Sheleg – Drums & Percussion

Additional instruments

- Ori Winokur – Piano & backing vocals on track 5
- Asaf Avidan – Synth on tracks 2, 3
- Hadas Kleinman – backing vocals on track 3
- All the Mojos – backing vocals on track 5
- CD, Cover & Map Design by – Noa Dolberg
- Illustrations by Reno Marca & Lilach Shmilovit
- Art Direction – Asaf Avidan
