= Supercry =

Studio album by Emma Louise
- Released: 15 July 2016
- Label: Liberation Music
- Producer: Pascal Gabriel

Emma Louise chronology
vs Head vs Heart (2013)	Supercry (2016)	Lilac Everything (2018)

Singles from Supercry
- 1. "Underflow" Released: 7 November 2015; 2. "Talk Baby Talk" Released: 18 March 2016; 3. "West End Kids" Released: 8 July 2016; 4. "Illuminate" Released: October 2016

Supercry is the second studio album by Australian recording artist Emma Louise, released on 15 July 2016. The album debuted at number 14 on the ARIA Albums Chart.

Emma Louise toured the album throughout October and November 2016.

== Singles ==
"Underflow" was released as the lead single on 7 November 2015. The music video premiered on 14 December 2015. The song placed second at the 2016 Vanda & Young Global Songwriting Competition.

"Talk Baby Talk" was released as the second single on 18 March 2016. Paul McBridge from Music Feeds called it "an emotion-charged last roll of the relationship dice."

"West End Kids" was released as the third single on 8 July 2016. Its video premiered in August 2016, and Sosefina Fuamoli from The Music AU described it as "Creepy, hypnotic and captivating."

"Illuminate" was released in October 2016 as the fourth and final single. A video was released to promote the single. Emma Louise said about the song, "It's about coming out of a dark time and being determined to turn yourself around for good."

A video for "I Thought I Was a Ship" was released in July 2016 to promote the album, with auspOp saying, "It's clear that 'I Thought I Was a Ship' isn't single material, but it's an utterly beautiful sub-five-minute advertisement for the album."

== Reception ==
Professional ratings
Review scores
Source	Rating
The Music	3.5/5 stars
The Brag	4/5 stars
The AU Review	9.5/10 stars

Clare Armstrong from The Music said, "Supercry is the kind of thoughtful pop that has you still thinking about the songs days later."

Natalia Morawski from The Brag said, "The top half of the album is radio-ready, with its catchy hooks and big production, but the back end is where Louise shines," calling the album "A pleasure to hear".

Claire Arnold from The AU Review said, "Supercry is exquisitely produced, articulating intimate emotions with immense vulnerability and competence. Fusing hauntingly beautiful vocals with delicate keys, Emma Louise continues to craft blissful indie pop that is earnest and relatable."

Paul McBridge from Music Feeds said, "Supercry will soothe your tortured soul and ease you into a state of transcendence within no time. By the end of a first listen, it's still unclear exactly what a Supercry is, but with this collection of songs, Emma Louise has cemented her place as one of Australia's finest young songwriters."

== Track listing ==
No.	Title	Writer(s)	Length
1.	"All We Ask Is Time"	Emma Louise Lobb	2:14
2.	"Talk Baby Talk"	Lobb	3:14
3.	"Underflow"	Lobb	3:37
4.	"West End Kids"	Lobb	3:49
5.	"Everything Will Be Fine"	Lobb	4:37
6.	"Illuminate"	Lobb	3:58
7.	"Colours"	Lobb	3:07
8.	"Shut the Door"	Lobb	3:41
9.	"Nowhere"	Lobb	3:18
10.	"Grace"	Lobb	3:35
11.	"I Thought I Was a Ship"	Lobb	4:40

== Charts ==
Chart (2016)	Peak position
Australian Albums (ARIA)	14

== Release history ==
Region	Date	Format	Label	Catalogue
Australia	23 March 2013	CD; digital download	Liberation Music	LMCD0286
