= Emma Louise =

Australian singer (born 1991)

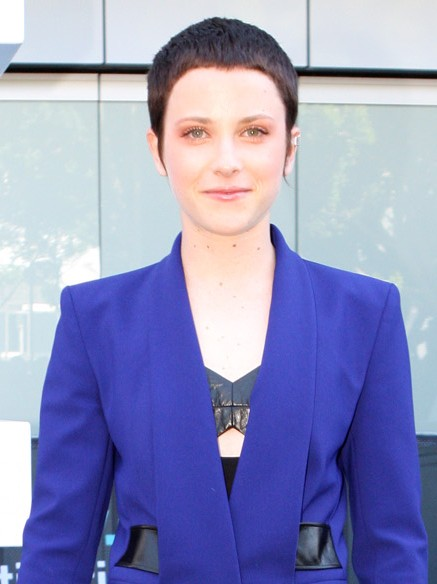
- Lobb at the ARIA Music Awards of 2013

Background information
- Born: Emma Louise Lobb; 16 July 1991 (age 35); Cairns, Queensland, Australia
- Genres: Pop; indie
- Occupation: Singer-songwriter
- Years active: 2007–present
- Website: emmalouise.net

Emma Louise Lobb (born 16 July 1991), known professionally as Emma Louise, is an Australian singer-songwriter. She is best known for her 2011 debut single "Jungle". Two studio albums, Vs Head vs Heart (March 2013) and Supercry (July 2016), have reached the ARIA Albums Chart top 15. At the ARIA Music Awards of 2013 she was nominated for Best Female Artist.

== Biography ==
=== 1991–2012: Early life and EPs ===
Emma Louise Lobb was born in July 1991. She grew up in Cairns. Lobb told ABC news "My dad bought me my first guitar when I was six and I wrote my first song when I was in grade nine, which was about a dog. I started to write serious songs… when I was in grade ten."

At the 2007 Queensland Music Awards Lobb won Best Secondary School song and the People's Choice Award with the guitar-driven ballad, "Kim's Song" despite the song only being available on her MySpace

Lobb issued a five-track extended play, Autumn Tongues, in 2008. It was recorded with Mark Myers at Pegasus Studios, Cairns. She moved from Cairns to Brisbane in early 2010 where she initially worked as an events manager. In the following year described her influences, "My biggest musical role models are Missy Higgins, Josh Pyke, Sarah Blasko and Lior. Missy Higgins really inspired me to start writing music."

In April 2011, Lobb released another EP, Full Hearts & Empty Rooms, and one of its four tracks, "Jungle", received high rotation on the national youth radio, Triple J. The EP reached the ARIA Singles Chart top 100. During that year she toured in support of Boy & Bear. She was nominated for the 2011 J Award in the Unearthed talent contest for artist of the year. On the Triple J Hottest 100, 2011, "Jungle" was listed at No. 23 by the station's listeners in its on line poll.

=== 2013–present: Studio albums ===
In March 2013, Lobb released her debut studio album, Vs Head vs Heart, which peaked at No. 12 on the ARIA Albums Chart. She was nominated for Best Female Artist at the ARIA Music Awards of 2013. She has won categories at the Queensland Music Awards in that year. Also in 2013 year German DJ and producer, Wankelmut, remixed Lobb's track, "Jungle", which was released as "My Head Is a Jungle". It subsequently reached double platinum status in Italy and top 30 in Germany. International fashion house Yves Saint Laurent used "Jungle" in their worldwide advertising campaign for Black Opium perfume in 2014.

In 2014, She collaborated with Australian electronic duo, Flight Facilities, featuring on their single, "Two Bodies", released in September 2014, which reached the ARIA top 100 and was placed at No. 39 on Triple J Hottest 100, 2014.

In 2015 Lobb was the opening act for English singer, Sam Smith, on the Oceania leg of their In the Lonely Hour Tour. She was also the main support on Smith's second Australian tour, during November–December of that year.

In 2015, Lobb signed with Liberation Music She issued her second solo album, Supercry, on 11 July 2016, which reached No. 14.

In 2016, Lobb appeared in an advertising campaign for South Australian Tourism Commission. The ad has her singing a version of the INXS song, "Never Tear Us Apart".

In September 2018, Lobb released her third studio album, Lilac Everything: A Project by Emma Louise

In August 2025, Lobb released Dumb, a collaborative album with Australian artist and producer Flume.

In March 2026, Lobb release "God Between Us", the lead single from her fourth solo studio album Sunshine for Happiness, scheduled for release on 1 May 2026.

== Personal life ==
Lobb married Canadian musician Tobias Jesso Jr. in January 2019; they have since had a child.

== Discography ==
=== Studio albums ===
Title	Album details	Peak chart positions	
Title	Album details	AUS	FRA
vs Head vs Heart	Released: 22 March 2013; Label: Emma-Louise, MGM (EL003)	12	87
Supercry	Released: 15 July 2016; Label: Liberation Music (LMCD0286)	14	—
Lilac Everything: A Project by Emma Louise	Released: 14 September 2018; Label: Liberation (LRCD0004)	143	—
Dumb (with Flume)	Released: 22 August 2025; Label: Flume, ADA (5021732532824)	—	—
Sunshine for Happiness	Released: 1 May 2026; Label: Future Classic (FCL648CD)	—	—

=== Extended plays ===
Title	Details	Peak chart positions	Certifications
Title	Details	AUS	Certifications
Autumn Tongues	Released: 2008	—	
Full Hearts & Empty Rooms	Released: 31 March 2011; Label: Emma-Louise, MGM (EL002)	93	ARIA: Platinum

=== Singles ===
==== As lead artist ====
Title	Year	Peak chart positions										Certifications	Album
Title	Year	AUS	AUT	BEL (Fl)	BEL (Wa)	FRA	GER	ITA	NED	SWI	UK	Certifications	Album
"Jungle"	2011	—	—	99	17	3	—	—	100	27	—		Full Hearts & Empty Rooms
"1000 Sundowns"	2011	134	—	—	—	—	—	—	—	—	—		Full Hearts & Empty Rooms
"It's Only Natural" (Lior and Emma Louise)	2011	—	—	—	—	—	—	—	—	—	—		They Will Have Their Way
"Boy"	2012	—	—	—	—	—	—	—	—	—	—		vs Head vs Heart
"My Head Is a Jungle" (Wankelmut and Emma Louise)	2013	—	55	34	64	80	29	5	68	35	5	BPI: 2× Platinum; ITA: 2× Platinum	vs Head vs Heart
"Freedom"	2013	—	—	—	—	—	—	—	—	—	—		vs Head vs Heart
"Mirrors"	2013	—	—	—	—	—	—	—	—	—	—		vs Head vs Heart
"Pontoon"	2013	—	—	—	—	—	—	—	—	—	—		vs Head vs Heart
"Underflow"	2015	115	—	—	—	—	—	—	—	—	—		Supercry
"Talk Baby Talk"	2016	—	—	—	—	—	—	—	—	—	—		Supercry
"West End Kids"	2016	—	—	—	—	—	—	—	—	—	—		Supercry
"Illuminate"	2016	—	—	—	—	—	—	—	—	—	—		Supercry
"Wish You Well"	2018	—	—	—	—	—	—	—	—	—	—		Lilac Everything: A Project by Emma Louise
"Mexico"	2018	—	—	—	—	—	—	—	—	—	—		Lilac Everything: A Project by Emma Louise
"Falling Apart"	2018	—	—	—	—	—	—	—	—	—	—		Lilac Everything: A Project by Emma Louise
"Easy Goodbye" (with Flume)	2025	—	—	—	—	—	—	—	—	—	—		Dumb
"Shine, Glow, Glisten" (with Flume)	2025	—	—	—	—	—	—	—	—	—	—		Dumb
"Monsoon" (with Flume)	2025	—	—	—	—	—	—	—	—	—	—		Dumb
"God Between Us"	2026	—	—	—	—	—	—	—	—	—	—		Sunshine for Happiness
"Nothing Could Tear Us Apart"	2026	—	—	—	—	—	—	—	—	—	—		Sunshine for Happiness

==== As featured artist ====
Title	Year	Peak chart positions		Album
Title	Year	AUS	FRA	Album
"The Sound of Silence" (RocKwiz featuring Emma Louise & Husky)	2012	—	148	Sunday Morning (RocKwiz album)
"Two Bodies" (Flight Facilities featuring Emma Louise)	2014	67	—	Down to Earth
"Arty Boy" (Flight Facilities featuring Emma Louise)	2017	—	—	Non-album single
"Hollow" (Flume featuring Emma Louise)	2022	—	—	Palaces

=== Other album appearances ===
List of other album appearances, with selected details
Title	Year	Album
"Tessellate" (Triple J Like a Version)	2013	Like a Version (Volume 9)
"Two Bodies (live)" (Flight Facilities featuring Emma Louise)	2015	Live with the Melbourne Symphony Orchestra
"Far Away" (Airling featuring Emma Louise)	2017	Hard to Sleep, Easy to Dream
"Into My Arms" (Triple J Like a Version)	2017	Like a Version (Volume 13)
"If Only I Could" (Flight Facilities featuring Emma Louise)	2021	Forever

== Awards and nominations ==
=== AIR Awards ===
The Australian Independent Record Awards (commonly known informally as AIR Awards) is an annual awards night to recognise, promote and celebrate the success of Australia's Independent Music sector.

Year	Nominee / work	Award	Result
2011	Herself	Breakthrough Independent Artist	Won
2011	Full Hearts & Empty Rooms	Best Independent Single/EP	Nominated
2019	Lilac Everything	Best Independent Album	Nominated

=== APRA Awards ===
The APRA Awards are presented annually from 1982 by the Australasian Performing Right Association (APRA), "honouring composers and songwriters". They commenced in 1982.

Year	Nominee / work	Award	Result	Ref.
2012	"Jungle"	Song of the Year	Shortlisted	

=== ARIA Music Awards ===
The ARIA Music Awards is an annual awards ceremony that recognises excellence, innovation, and achievement across all genres of Australian music.

Year	Nominee / work	Award	Result
2013	Vs Head Vs Heart	Best Female Artist	Nominated
2025	Eric J Dubowsky for Emma Louise and Flume – Dumb	Best Engineered Release	Nominated

=== J Awards ===
The J Awards are an annual series of Australian music awards that were established by the Australian Broadcasting Corporation's youth-focused radio station Triple J. They commenced in 2005.

Year	Nominee / work	Award	Result
2011	Herself	Unearthed Artist of the Year	Nominated

=== Queensland Music Awards ===
The Queensland Music Awards (previously known as Q Song Awards) are annual awards celebrating Queensland, Australia's brightest emerging artists and established legends. They commenced in 2006.

Year	Nominee / work	Award	Result (wins only)
2007	"Kim's Song"	Secondary School Song of the Year	Won
2007	"Kim's Song"	The Courier-Mail People's Choice Award	Won
2011	"Jungle"	Song of the Year	Won
2011	"Jungle"	Pop Song of the Year	Won
2011	"1000 Sundowns"	Folk Song of the Year	Won
2013	vs Head vs Heart	Album of the Year	Won
2013	herself	Export Achievement Award	awarded
2013	herself (for "Boy")	The Courier-Mail People's Choice Award Most Popular Female	Won

=== Vanda & Young Global Songwriting Competition ===
The Vanda & Young Global Songwriting Competition is an annual competition that "acknowledges great songwriting whilst supporting and raising money for Nordoff-Robbins" and is coordinated by Albert Music and APRA AMCOS. It commenced in 2009.

Year	Nominee / work	Award	Result
2016	"Underflow"	Vanda & Young Global Songwriting Competition	2nd
