= Dimmi che non passa (song) =

- Caption from "Dimmi che non passa" music video

Single by Violetta Zironi
- Released: 12 December 2013
- Recorded: 2013
- Genre: Folk, country pop
- Length: 3:20
- Label: Sony Music
- Songwriter: Christian Lavoro
- Producer: Michele Canova Iorfida

Violetta Zironi singles chronology
"Dimmi che non passa" (2013)	"Il primo giorno d'estate" (2014)

Music video
- "Dimmi che non passa" on YouTube

"Dimmi che non passa" is the first single by Violetta Zironi, from her debut EP of the same name released on 12 December 2013, the day after the final of season 7 of the Italian version of The X Factor.

== Writing and recording ==
Music and lyrics to the song were written by Italian singer-songwriter and guitar player Christian "Chris" Lavoro. The track is basically a fresh pop song but with a country and folk mood, and has its signature marks in the opening whistle which occurs again after the chorus and before the final, and in the easy-to-remember melody of the chorus, "sticky as a chewing gum" in the words of Mika, Violetta's mentor during the TV show. The song was recorded at Sunset Sound Studio 3 in Milan, during Violetta's stay in The X Factor loft.

== Music video ==
The music video was shot in Milan, Italy in December 2013. It was directed by a team of directors under the alias name of Tom Summers. It was officially released on 23 December 2013.

== Live performances ==
The song was first performed live on 5 December 2013 during the semi-final of The X Factor. Two days later Violetta performed the song on stage again during her first concert after the beginning of the TV show, right before the final; during this performance she turned to English the lyrics to the second chorus. The following week the song was performed again in The X Factor final, held at Mediolanum Forum near Milan, Italy. Soon after the final, Violetta opened the concert of Italian rock band Elio e le Storie Tese in her hometown Reggio Emilia; in this occasion she sang "Dimmi che non passa" with the sole accompaniment of her ukulele.

== Reception ==
The song peaked at No. 6 in the Italian Top Download Chart the week following its release and has been aired by most Italian radio stations.

== Credits and personnel ==
=== Recording ===
- Record producer – Michele Canova Iorfida
- Engineering – Geoff Neal
- Studio Assistant – Morgan Stratton
- Additional Recording & Editing – Patrizio "Pat" Simonini
- Mixing – Pino "Pinaxa" Pischetola
- Mixing assistance – Sean Leonard

=== Personnel ===
- Drums – Victor Indrizzo
- Bass – Sean Hurley
- Piano / B3 – Jeff Babko
- Acoustic and Electric Guitar – Michael Landau

== Charts ==
Weekly chart performance for "Dimmi che non passa"
Chart (2013)	Peak position
Italy (FIMI)	6
