= One Day / Reckoning Song =

2008 single by Asaf Avidan

"Reckoning Song"

Single by Asaf Avidan & the Mojos

from the album The Reckoning
- Released: 2008 (Israel)
- Recorded: 2008
- Genre: Folk; soul
- Length: 2:46
- Label: Telmavar
- Songwriter: Asaf Avidan
- Producers: Asaf Avidan; Ori Winokur

Asaf Avidan & the Mojos singles chronology
"Reckoning Song" (2008)	"Weak" (2008)

"One Day / Reckoning Song (Wankelmut Rmx)"

Single by Asaf Avidan
- Released: June 1, 2012
- Recorded: 2012
- Genre: House; folktronica; trip hop
- Length: 3:32
- Label: Fine; Four; Columbia; Sony
- Songwriter: Asaf Avidan
- Producer: Wankelmut (remix)

Asaf Avidan singles chronology
"One Day / Reckoning Song (Wankelmut Rmx)" (2012)	"Different Pulses" (2012)

Wankelmut singles chronology
"One Day / Reckoning Song (Wankelmut Rmx)" (2012)	"My Head Is a Jungle" (2013)

"Reckoning Song" is a song written by Israeli singer-songwriter Asaf Avidan and performed by Asaf Avidan and the Mojos. The original under this title is track number 5 on the band's 2008 album The Reckoning.

A remixed version of the song credited as "One Day / Reckoning Song (Wankelmut Rmx)" produced by German DJ Wankelmut became a huge commercial success in many European charts, including number one positions in Austria, Belgium, Hungary, Netherlands, Switzerland, Italy and Germany. It also charted in Poland, France, Denmark, Sweden, Latvia, Luxembourg and Romania. The song is released on the Four Music label and distributed throughout Europe by Sony. The Wankelmut Remix is the version that received radio play in the UK and was described as "having all the hallmarks of classical minimal techno". The single is Asaf Avidan's follow-up to "Different Pulses" from his 2012 solo album of the same name. The song was featured in a Hyundai commercial in 2016.

== Music video ==
A music video was prepared for the single release on 22 June 2012. The video was directed by Daniel Franke and Sander Houtkruijer and stars performance artists Voin de Voin, Stephanie Ballantine and Blagoy Veogalb. From the same directors and performers there was a second version where the script occurs in day light. This second version has been removed from YouTube and all video media without notice.

== Cover versions ==
In November 2013 a version of the track inspired by the Wankelmut remix was sung by young Italian singer Violetta Zironi during season 7 of the Italian version of The X Factor. The track was also recorded and included in her debut EP "Dimmi che non passa" released in December 2013.

== Track listing ==
Digital promo – Four Music / Columbia
1. "One Day / Reckoning Song (Wankelmut Rmx)" – 3:30
Digital download (Beatport) – Fine Records
1. "One Day / Reckoning Song (Wankelmut Rmx)" – 7:16
CD single – Four Music
1. "One Day / Reckoning Song (Wankelmut Rmx)" (radio edit) – 3:30
2. "One Day / Reckoning Song (Wankelmut Rmx)" (club mix) – 7:16
CD maxi – Four Music
1. "One Day / Reckoning Song (Wankelmut Rmx)" (radio edit) – 3:33
2. "One Day / Reckoning Song (Wankelmut Rmx)" (club mix) – 7:18
3. "One Day / Reckoning Song (Wankelmut Rmx)" (Wankelmut in dub mix) – 4:53
4. "Reckoning Song" – 2:49
5. "One Day / Reckoning Song (Wankelmut Rmx)" (instrumental) – 4:53
6. "One Day / Reckoning Song (Wankelmut Rmx)" (day version) (video) – 3:30
7. "One Day / Reckoning Song (Wankelmut Rmx)" (night version) (video) – 3:30

== Chart positions ==
=== Weekly charts ===
Chart (2012–13)	Peak position
Austria (Ö3 Austria Top 40)	1
Belgium (Ultratop 50 Flanders)	1
Belgium (Ultratop 50 Wallonia)	1
Czech Republic Airplay (ČNS IFPI)	2
Denmark (Tracklisten)	2
France (SNEP)	2
Germany (GfK)	1
Hungary (Dance Top 40)	1
Hungary (Rádiós Top 40)	1
Hungary (Single Top 40)	3
Israel International Airplay (Media Forest)	7
Italy (FIMI)	1
Italy Airplay (EarOne)	1
Luxembourg Digital Songs (Billboard)	1
Netherlands (Dutch Top 40)	1
Netherlands (Single Top 100)	1
Norway (VG-lista)	4
Poland Airplay (ZPAV)	1
Poland Dance (ZPAV)	20
Portugal (Billboard)	2
Romania TV Airplay (Media Forest)	1
Scottish Singles Sales (Official Charts)	29
Slovakia Airplay (ČNS IFPI)	1
Spain (Promusicae)	33
Sweden (Sverigetopplistan)	8
Switzerland (Schweizer Hitparade)	1
UK Singles (Official Charts)	30
US Hot Dance/Electronic Songs (Billboard)	21

=== Year-end charts ===
Annual chart rankings for "One Day / Reckoning Song"
Chart (2012)	Position
Austria (Ö3 Austria Top 40)	5
Belgium (Ultratop Flanders)	5
Belgium (Ultratop Wallonia)	4
Denmark (Tracklisten)	43
France (SNEP)	11
Germany (Media Control Charts)	5
Hungary (Dance Top 40)	30
Hungary (Rádiós Top 40)	5
Italy (FIMI)	9
Italy Airplay (EarOne)	43
Netherlands (Dutch Top 40)	12
Netherlands (Mega Top 100)	9
Sweden (Sverigetopplistan)	38
Switzerland (Schweizer Hitparade)	4
Chart (2013)	Position
Belgium (Ultratop Wallonia)	62
France (SNEP)	14
Hungary (Dance Top 40)	1
Hungary (Rádiós Top 40)	13
Italy (FIMI)	37
Italian Airplay (EarOne)	63
Sweden (Sverigetopplistan)	47
Switzerland (Schweizer Hitparade)	56
Chart (2014)	Position
France (SNEP)	142
Hungary (Dance Top 40)	59
Chart (2015)	Position
France (SNEP)	193

== Certifications ==
Region	Certification	Certified units/sales
Austria (IFPI Austria)	Platinum	30,000^{*}
Belgium (BRMA)	Platinum	30,000^{*}
Denmark (IFPI Danmark)	Gold	15,000^{^}
France (SNEP)	Platinum	150,000^{*}
Germany (BVMI)	Platinum	300,000^{^}
Italy (FIMI)	4× Platinum	120,000^{‡}
Portugal (AFP)	Gold	10,000^{‡}
Sweden (GLF)	3× Platinum	120,000^{‡}
Switzerland (IFPI Switzerland)	3× Platinum	90,000^{^}
United Kingdom (BPI)	Silver	200,000^{‡}
Streaming
Denmark (IFPI Danmark)	3× Platinum	5,400,000^{†}
^{*} Sales figures based on certification alone.^{^} Shipments figures based on certification alone.^{‡} Sales+streaming figures based on certification alone.^{†} Streaming-only figures based on certification alone.

== Release history ==
Regions	Dates	Format(s)	Label
Australia	June 4, 2012	digital download	Columbia Records
Austria	June 4, 2012	digital download	Columbia Records
France	June 4, 2012	digital download	Columbia Records
Germany	June 4, 2012	digital download	Columbia Records
Italy	June 4, 2012	digital download	Columbia Records
Luxemburg	June 4, 2012	digital download	Columbia Records
New Zealand	June 4, 2012	digital download	Columbia Records
Switzerland	June 4, 2012	digital download	Columbia Records
Belgium	June 29, 2012	digital download	Four Music
Canada	June 29, 2012	digital download	Four Music
Denmark	June 29, 2012	digital download	Columbia Records
United States	August 21, 2012	digital download	Columbia Records
Ireland	October 5, 2012	digital download	Four Music
United Kingdom	October 5, 2012	digital download	Four Music

== See also ==
- List of Dutch Top 40 number-one singles of 2012
- List of number-one hits of 2012 (Italy)
