= Jungle (Emma Louise song) =

2011 single by Emma Louise

Single by Emma Louise

from the album Full Hearts & Empty Rooms
- Released: 31 March 2011
- Recorded: 2011
- Genre: Indie pop
- Length: 3:22
- Songwriter: Emma Louise
- Producer: Mark Myers

Emma Louise singles chronology
"Jungle" (2011)	"It's Only Natural" (2011)

Music video
- "Jungle" on YouTube

"Jungle" is a song by Australian singer Emma Louise, which was uploaded to Triple J Unearthed on 5 March 2011, before being released officially on 31 March 2011, as the lead single from Louise's second EP, Full Hearts & Empty Rooms. An accompanying music video was released on 23 May 2011.

At the Queensland Music Awards of 2011, "Jungle" won Song of the Year.

The song gained international success with a remix by German DJ Wankelmut, retitled "My Head Is a Jungle", in January 2013. Louise's solo version has charted in its own right in a number of countries, most notably peaking at number three on the French Singles Chart. After the success of the Wankelmut remix, Louise included both versions on the European edition of her 2013 studio album, vs Head vs Heart.

"Jungle" was used in season 1, episode 9 of the Australian prison drama Wentworth. It was also used in season 8, episode 2 of Grey's Anatomy.

In January 2022, the song went viral on TikTok as part of the "My Head Is a Jungle" trend, almost eleven years since the release of the original version and nine years since the Wankelmut remix.

== Music video ==
In the music video for "Jungle", Louise sings the song stuck in a dark room with light bulbs hanging from the ceiling. In between cutouts, she is seen reading a book and opening a suitcase in the attic. The length of the video is 3 minutes and 23 seconds. An edit of the same video was made for the Wankelmut remix, at a length of 3 minutes and 33 seconds.

== Track listings ==
Digital download

1. "Jungle" – 3:22

Digital download

1. "Jungle" (Arundel Remix) – 4:52

== Charts ==
=== Weekly charts ===
Chart (2011, 14–15)	Peak position
Belgium (Ultratop 50 Wallonia)	17
France (SNEP)	3
Netherlands (Single Top 100)	100
Switzerland (Schweizer Hitparade)	27

=== Year-end charts ===
Chart (2014)	Position
France (SNEP)	58
Chart (2015)	Position
Belgium (Ultratop Wallonia)	48
France (SNEP)	75
