= X Factor (Italian TV series) season 7 =

X Factor
- Season 7
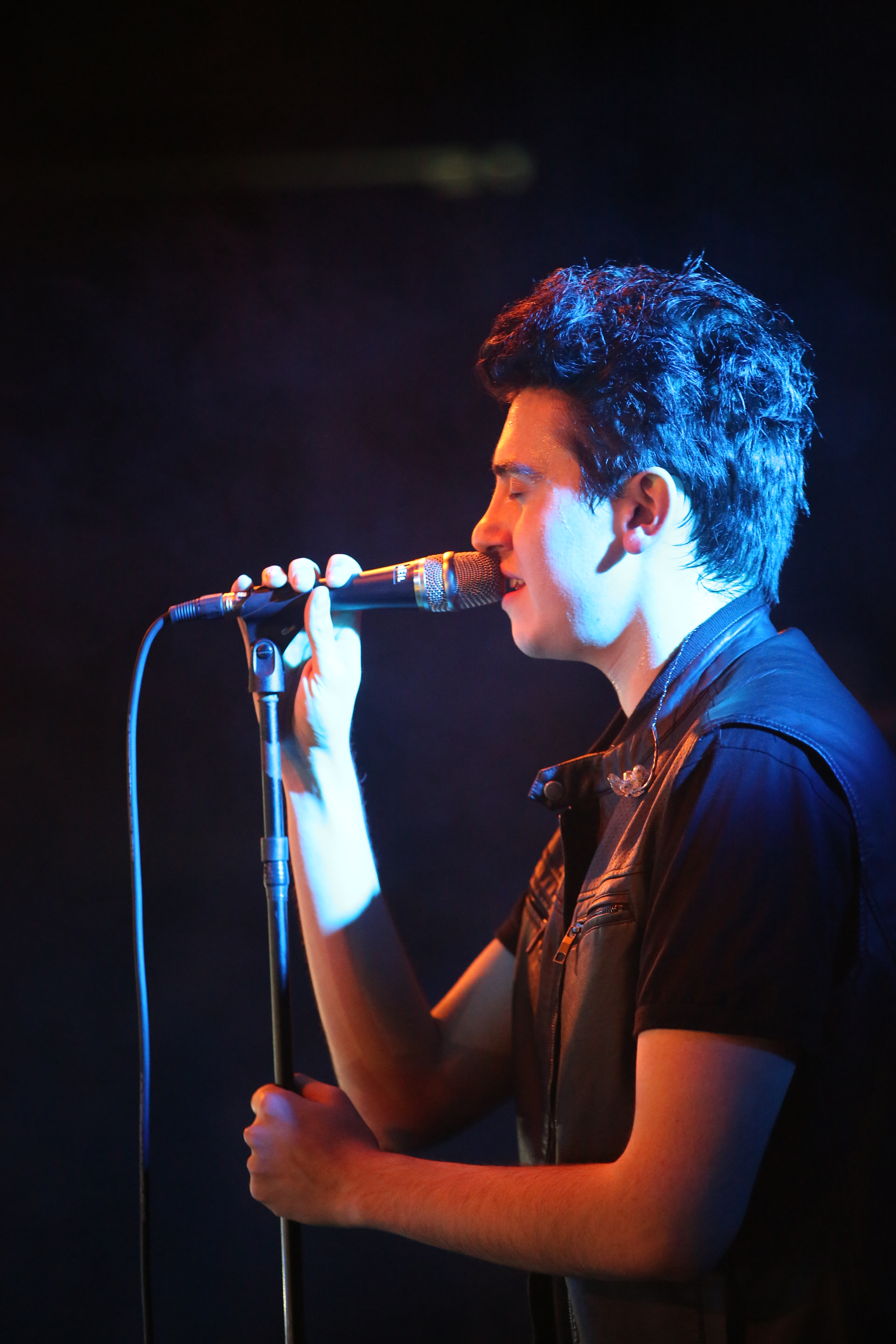
- Hosted by: Alessandro Cattelan (Sky Uno)
- Judges: Elio; Mika; Morgan; Simona Ventura
- Winner: Michele Bravi
- Winning mentor: Morgan
- Runner-up: Ape Escape
- Finals venue: X Factor Arena, Milan (Weeks 1-7); Mediolanum Forum, Assago (Week 8)

Release
- Original network: Sky Uno; Cielo
- Original release: 26 September – 12 December 2013

Season chronology
- ← Previous; Season 6 Next → Season 8

X Factor is an Italian television music competition to find new singing talent; the winner receives a € 300,000 recording contract with Sony Music. Before the start of the auditions process it was announced that Elio, Morgan and Simona Ventura would be confirmed as judges and mentors, whilst Mika has been chosen for replacing Arisa in the role; also Alessandro Cattelan returned as host. The seventh season aired on Sky Uno starting from 26 September 2013 to 12 December 2013.

Auditions for season 7 took place in Naples, Genoa and Milan in June 2013; bootcamp took place in Milan for two days, on 26 and 27 June. Unconfirmed rumors revealed that Elio will mentor the Over-25s, Morgan the boys, Mika the girls and Ventura the groups; they selected their final three acts during judges' houses.

Michele Bravi, a member of the category Boys and mentored by Morgan, was announced the winner of the competition on 12 December 2013. His winner's single, "La vita e la felicità", released immediately after the end of the show, was co-written by Italian singer-songwriter Tiziano Ferro.

== Judges, presenters and other personnel ==
Series 7 Judges

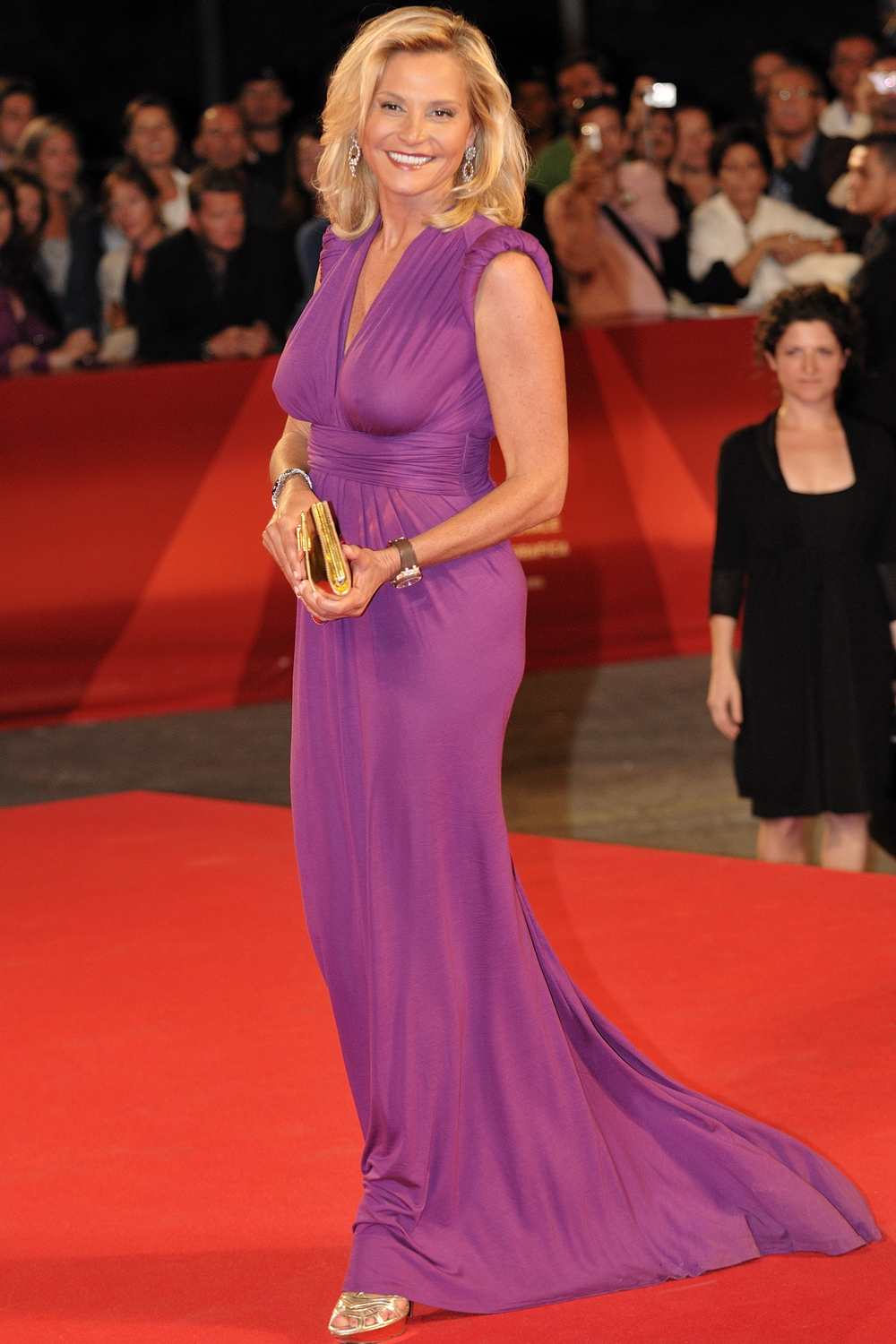
Simona Ventura

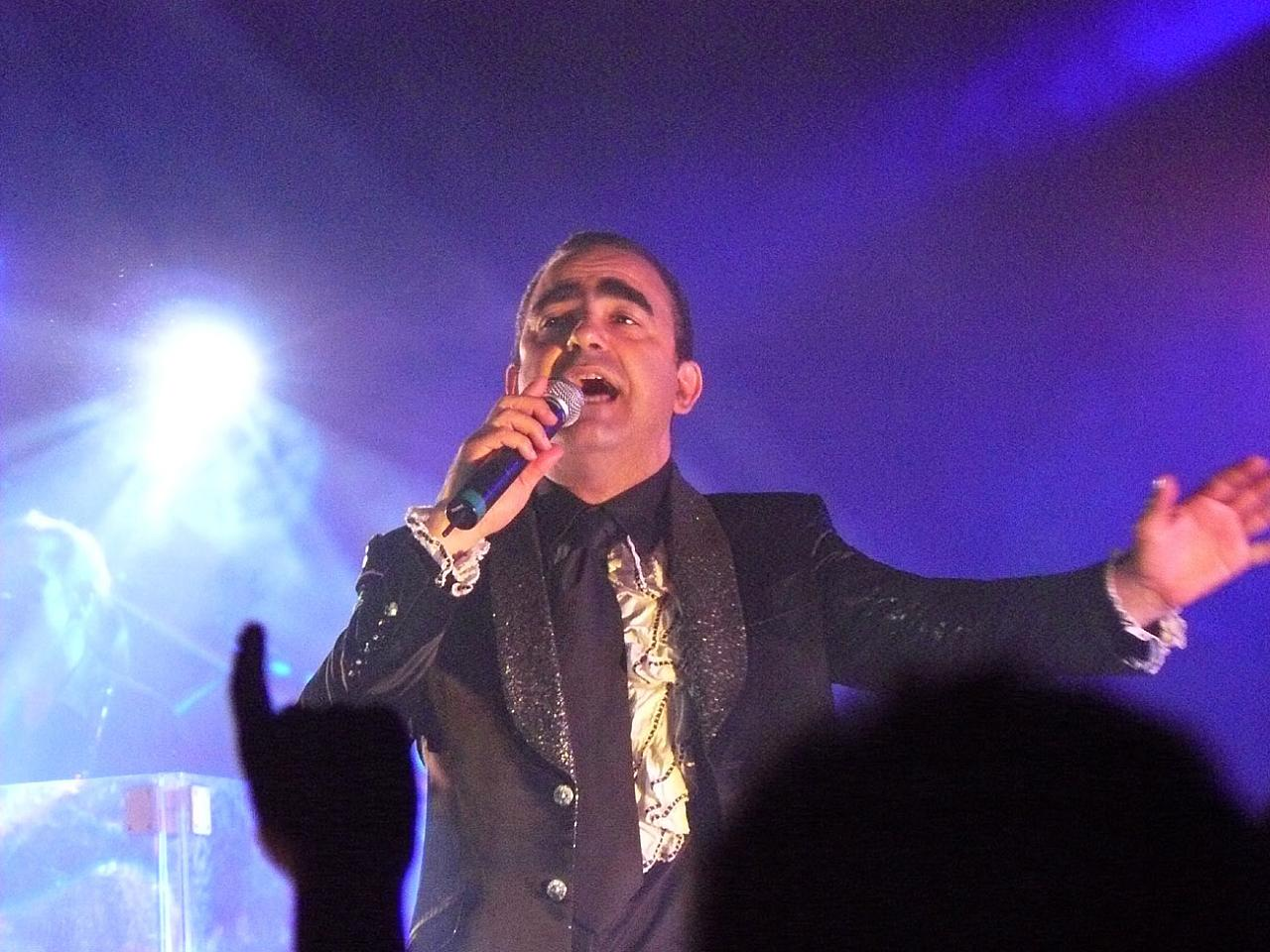
Elio

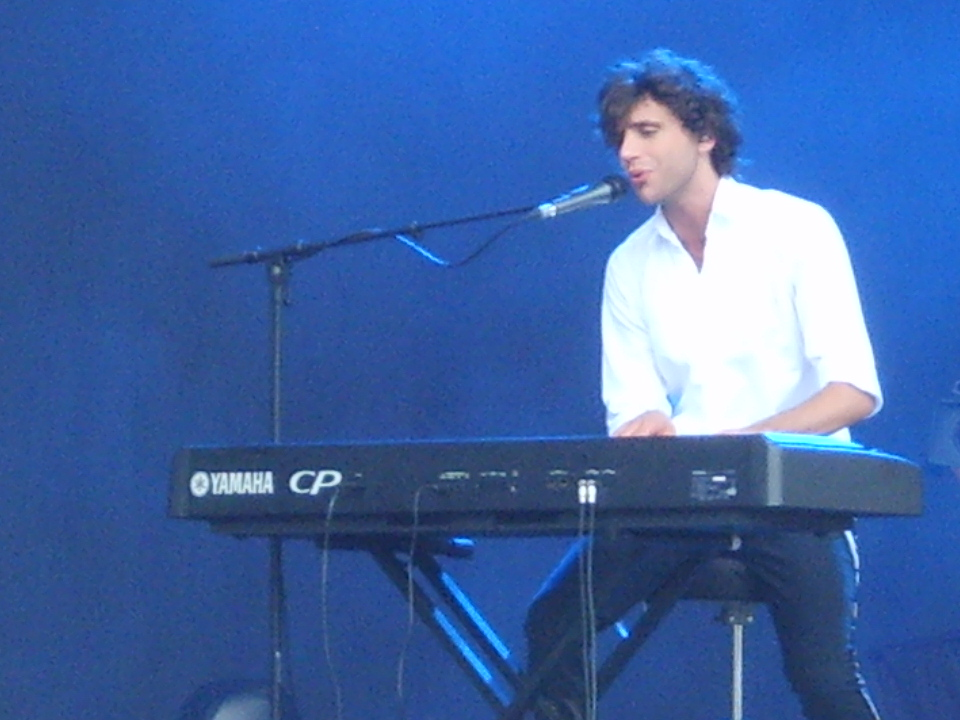
Mika

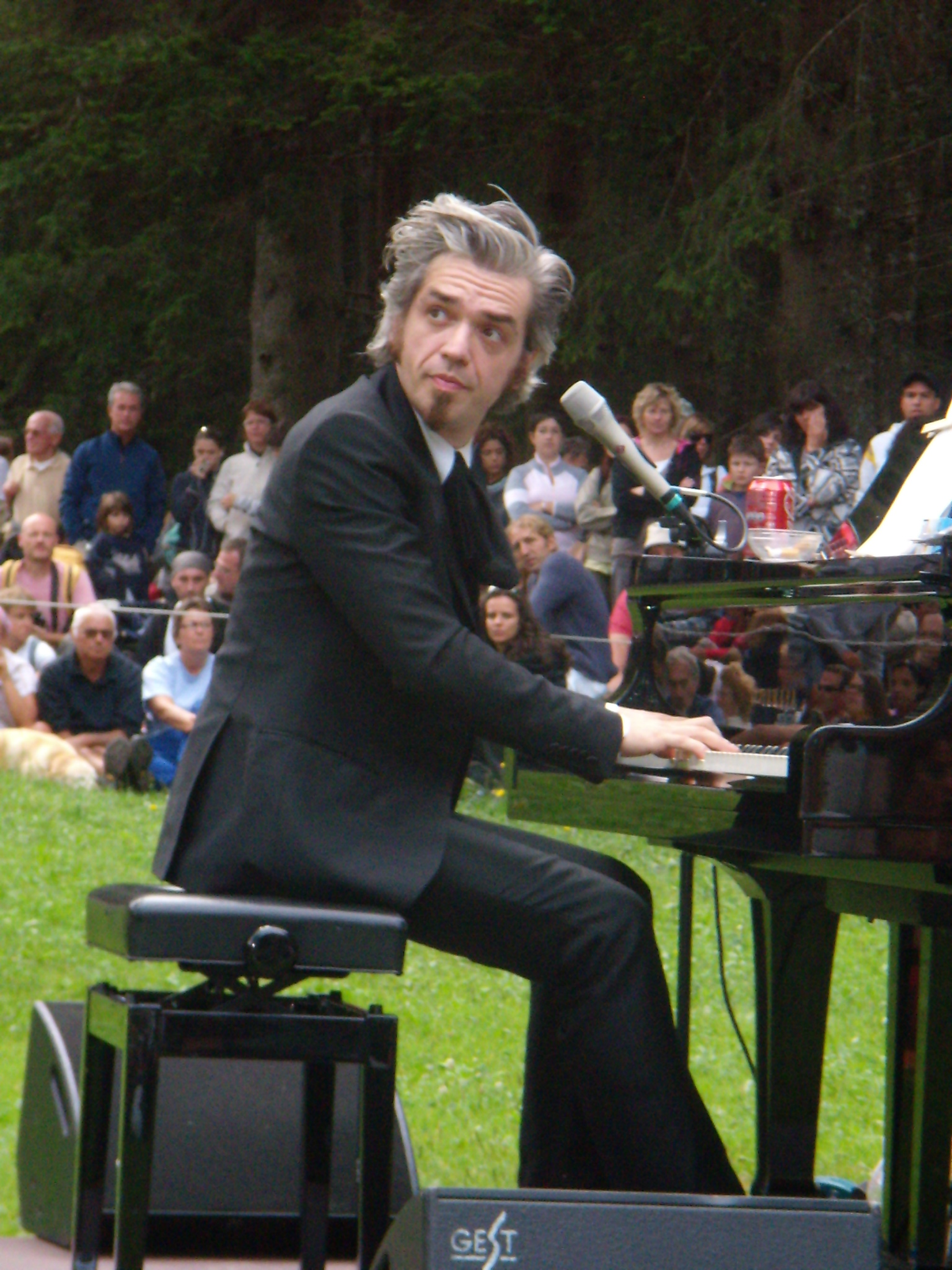
Morgan

During the sixth Live Show of the season, Arisa complained about voting mechanism, and tossed allegations against Simona Ventura, accusing her of being «phony» in judging her acts. In February 2013, Sky Movies and Entertainment vice-president Andrea Scrosati announced in an interview to Corriere della Sera that Arisa would not be confirmed as a mentor. At first, even Morgan and Elio seemed intended to leave the show; newspapers and websites cited Malika Ayane, Lorella Cuccarini and Gigi D'Alessio as possible replacements. On 23 April it was announced that Mika would be the first non-Italian mentor in the competition history; finally, on 12 and 19 May the presences of Morgan and Elio were confirmed.

Alessandro Cattelan has been confirmed to present the main show on Sky Uno HD in February 2013. Also vocal coaches Alberto Tafuri, Paola Folli and Gaetano Cappa, music-director Lucio Fabbri and art-director and choreographer Luca Tomassini were confirmed, whilst Mika chose Rossana Casale as the fourth vocal coach.

=== Applications and auditions ===
Cities that auditions and/or pre-auditions were held in.

A preliminary phase of auditions was held:

- at Castel Sant'Elmo, Naples, from 12 to 14 May 2013;
- at Unicredit Tower, Milan, from 25 to 27 May 2013.

The judges auditions was held:

- at 105 Stadium, Genoa, on 1 and 2 June 2013;
- at Teatro Dal Verme, Milan, from 17 to 19 June 2013.

On 18 June auditions Fedez starred as guest-judge.

=== Bootcamp ===
Bootcamp took place at Mediolanum Forum, Assago, over two days, on Wednesday 26 and Thursday 27 June.

=== Judges' houses ===
"Home visits" was broadcast on 17 October. Morgan mentored the Boys at E-Werk, Berlin, assisted by Asia Argento; Mika took the Girls at Slane Castle, Republic of Ireland, assisted by Marco Mengoni; Elio auditioned the Over 25s at Museo del Violino, Cremona, with Linus, and Ventura tested the Groups at Officine Grandi Riparazioni, Turin with Davide Dileo.

The twelve eliminated acts were:

- Boys: Andrea Butturini, Marco Colonna, Alberto Galuppini
- Girls: Chiara Grispo, Valentina Livi, Roberta Pompa
- 25+: Valeria Crescenzi, Sebastiano Di Santo, Adriana Salvadori
- Groups: Dynamo, Extra, Mr. Rain & Osso

In the second live show, the eliminated act of the home visits, Roberta Pompa was brought back, after a final showdown with Mr. Rain & Osso.

== Contestants and categories ==
Key:

– Winner
– Runner-up
– Third place

Category (mentor)	Acts			
Boys (Morgan)	Michele Bravi	Andrea D'Alessio	Lorenzo Iuracà	
Girls (Mika)	Gaia Galizia	Roberta Pompa	Valentina Tioli	Violetta Zironi
25+ (Elio)	Aba	Fabio Santini	Alan Scaffardi	
Groups (Ventura)	Ape Escape	FreeBoys	Street Clerks	

== Live shows ==
=== Results summary ===
The number of votes received by each act were released by Sky Italia after the final.

Colour key

–	Contestant was in the bottom two/three and had to sing again in the final showdown
–	Contestant was in the bottom three but received the fewest votes and was immediately eliminated
–	Contestant received the fewest public votes and was immediately eliminated (no final showdown)
–	Contestant received the most public votes

Weekly results per contestant
Contestant	Week 1		Week 2		Week 3		Week 4		Week 5		Quarter-Final		Semi-Final		Final		
Contestant	Part 1	Part 2	Part 1	Part 2	Part 1	Part 2	Round 1	Round 2	Round 1	Round 2	Round 1	Round 2	Round 1	Round 2	Round 1	Round 2	Round 3
Michele Bravi	—N/a	3rd 20.71%	2nd 19.89%	—N/a	1st 24.80%	—N/a	—N/a	1st 30.12%	1st 23.77%	—N/a	1st 26.73%	1st 27.41%	1st 31.00%	1st 29.88%	1st 37.33%	1st 42.67%	Winner; 57.33%
Ape Escape	—N/a	2nd 24.28%	—N/a	1st 22.69%	3rd 21.16%	—N/a	1st 25.35%	—N/a	2nd 18.03%	—N/a	3rd 15.43%	5th 14.55%	2nd 22.08%	3rd 24.11%	2nd 22.61%	2nd 31.49%	Runner-up; 42.67%
Violetta Zironi	—N/a	1st 24.33%	1st 25.54%	—N/a	—N/a	1st 28.13%	—N/a	2nd 22.16%	3rd 13.79%	—N/a	5th 14.56%	3rd 18.27%	3rd 19.19%	2nd 26.10%	3rd 21.59%	3rd 26.04%	Eliminated (final)
Aba	—N/a	5th 10.20%	—N/a	5th 10.34%	—N/a	5th 14.96%	—N/a	3rd 17.81%	5th 10.07%	—N/a	2nd 15.98%	2nd 24.19%	4th 15.58%	4th 19.91%	4th 18.48%	Eliminated (final)	
Andrea D'Alessio	3rd 20.51%	—N/a	—N/a	2nd 21.13%	—N/a	2nd 20.53%	2nd 22.66%	—N/a	4th 11.18%	—N/a	4th 14.74%	4th 15.57%	5th 12.15%	—N/a	Eliminated (semi-final)		
Gaia Galizia	2nd 22.29%	—N/a	4th 15.10%	—N/a	4th 11.86%	—N/a	—N/a	4th 16.12%	7th 8.16%	1st 39.54%	6th 12.56%	—N/a	Eliminated (quarter-final)				
Fabio Santini	5th 10.78%	—N/a	6th 9.42%	—N/a	5th 10.14%	—N/a	5th 11.80%	—N/a	8th 6.52%	2nd 31.66%	Eliminated (Week 5)						
Valentina Tioli	1st 24.31%	—N/a	—N/a	4th 15.68%	2nd 22.43%	—N/a	3rd 20.66%	—N/a	6th 8.48%	3rd 28.80%	Eliminated (Week 5)						
Street Clerks	—N/a	4th 12.15%	5th 13.72%	—N/a	—N/a	3rd 19.55%	—N/a	5th 13.78%	Eliminated (Week 4)								
Roberta Pompa	Not in live show		—N/a	3rd 20.74%	—N/a	4th 16.84%	4th 19.53%	—N/a	Eliminated (Week 4)								
Alan Scaffardi	4th 13.18%	—N/a	3rd 17.82%	—N/a	6th 9.42%	—N/a	Eliminated (Week 3)										
FreeBoys	6th 8.27%	—N/a	—N/a	6th 7.94%	Eliminated (Week 2)												
Lorenzo Iuracà	—N/a	6th 8.33%	Eliminated (Week 1)														
Final showdown	FreeBoys, Lorenzo Iuracà		Fabio Santini, FreeBoys		Alan Scaffardi, Aba		Roberta Pompa, Fabio Santini	Gaia Galizia, Street Clerks	Fabio Santini, Gaia Galizia		Gaia Galizia, Ape Escape		Andrea D'Alessio, Aba		No final showdown or judges' vote: results will be based on public votes alone		
Judges' vote to eliminate															No final showdown or judges' vote: results will be based on public votes alone		
Elio's vote	Lorenzo Iuracà		FreeBoys		Alan Scaffardi		Roberta Pompa	Street Clerks	Gaia Galizia		Gaia Galizia		Andrea D'Alessio		No final showdown or judges' vote: results will be based on public votes alone		
Mika's vote	Lorenzo Iuracà		FreeBoys		Aba		Fabio Santini	Street Clerks	Fabio Santini		Ape Escape		Andrea D'Alessio		No final showdown or judges' vote: results will be based on public votes alone		
Morgan's vote	FreeBoys		Fabio Santini		Alan Scaffardi		Roberta Pompa	Gaia Galizia	Fabio Santini		Ape Escape		Aba		No final showdown or judges' vote: results will be based on public votes alone		
Ventura's vote	Lorenzo Iuracà		Fabio Santini		Alan Scaffardi		Roberta Pompa	Gaia Galizia	Fabio Santini		Gaia Galizia		Aba		No final showdown or judges' vote: results will be based on public votes alone		
Eliminated	Lorenzo Iuracà; 3 of 4 votes majority		FreeBoys; 2 of 4 votes Deadlock		Alan Scaffardi; 3 of 4 votes majority		Roberta Pompa; 3 of 4 votes majority	Street Clerks; 2 of 4 votes Deadlock	Valentina Tioli; Public vote 28.80% to save		Gaia Galizia; 2 of 4 votes Deadlock		Andrea D'Alessio; 2 of 4 votes Deadlock		Aba; Public vote 18.48% to save	Violetta Zironi; Public vote 26.04% to save	Ape Escape; Public vote 42.67% to win
Eliminated	Lorenzo Iuracà; 3 of 4 votes majority		FreeBoys; 2 of 4 votes Deadlock		Alan Scaffardi; 3 of 4 votes majority		Roberta Pompa; 3 of 4 votes majority	Street Clerks; 2 of 4 votes Deadlock	Fabio Santini; 3 of 4 votes majority		Gaia Galizia; 2 of 4 votes Deadlock		Andrea D'Alessio; 2 of 4 votes Deadlock		Aba; Public vote 18.48% to save	Violetta Zironi; Public vote 26.04% to save	Michele Bravi; Public vote 57.33% to win

=== Live show details ===
==== Week 1 (24 October 2013) ====
- Group performance: "Qualcosa che non c'è" (with Elisa)
- Celebrity performers: Chiara ("The Final Countdown"/"Il futuro che sarà"/"Purple Rain"/"L'esperienza dell'amore"/"Distratto"), Francesca Michielin ("Cigno nero"/"Due respiri"), Elisa ("L'anima vola") and Icona Pop ("I Love It")

Contestants' performances on the first live show
Part 1
Act	Order	Song	Result
Gaia Galizia	1	"Seven Nation Army"	Safe
Andrea D'Alessio	2	"Clint Eastwood"	Safe
FreeBoys	3	"Baby Can I Hold You"	Bottom two
Fabio Santini	4	"Sotto casa"	Safe
Valentina Tioli	5	"Where Is the Love?"	Safe
Alan Scaffardi	6	"Creep"	Safe
Part 2
Act	Order	Song	Result
Michele Bravi	7	"Carte da decifrare"	Safe
Aba	8	"You Oughta Know"	Safe
Street Clerks	9	"Wake Me Up"	Safe
Lorenzo Iuracà	10	"Se sapessi come fai"	Bottom two
Violetta Zironi	11	"Let Her Go"	Safe
Ape Escape	12	"Burn It Down"	Safe
Final showdown details
Act	Order	Songs	Result
FreeBoys	13	"Umbrella"	Safe
FreeBoys	15	"Grazie perché" (a cappella)	Safe
Lorenzo Iuracà	14	"Emozioni"	Eliminated
Lorenzo Iuracà	16	"Kiss from a Rose" (a cappella)	Eliminated

Judges' votes to eliminate

- Ventura: Lorenzo Iuracà – backed her own act, FreeBoys.
- Morgan: FreeBoys – backed his own act, Lorenzo Iuracà.
- Mika: Lorenzo Iuracà – considered it appropriate to continue the project of an Italian boyband.
- Elio: Lorenzo Iuracà – having revealed the difficulties in approaching the songwriting.

==== Week 2 (31 October 2013) ====
- Group performance: "Walk on the Wild Side"
- Celebrity performers: Ellie Goulding ("Burn")

Contestants' performances on the second live show
Part 1
Act	Order	Song	Result
Street Clerks	1	"Nice che dice"	Safe
Gaia Galizia	2	"Bitch"	Safe
Alan Scaffardi	3	"Don't Let Me Be Misunderstood"	Safe
Michele Bravi	4	"See Emily Play"	Safe
Fabio Santini	5	"Basket Case"	Bottom two
Violetta Zironi	6	"Le tasche piene di sassi"	Safe
Part 2
Act	Order	Song	Result
FreeBoys	7	"Let Me Entertain You"	Bottom two
Aba	8	"Lover to Lover"	Safe
Andrea D'Alessio	9	"Another Brick in the Wall"	Safe
Roberta Pompa	10	"Trouble"	Safe
Ape Escape	11	"Luce (Tramonti a nord est)"	Safe
Valentina Tioli	12	"Raggamuffin"	Safe
Act	Order	Song	Result
Fabio Santini	13	"Suspicious Minds"	Safe
FreeBoys	14	"Try"	Eliminated

Judges' votes to eliminate

- Elio: FreeBoys – backed his own act, Fabio Santini.
- Ventura: Fabio Santini – backed her own act, FreeBoys.
- Mika: FreeBoys – wanted to give Santini another chance.
- Morgan: Fabio Santini – could not decide so chose to take it to deadlock.

With both acts receiving two votes each, the result went to deadlock and a new public vote commenced for 200 seconds. FreeBoys were eliminated as the act with the fewest public votes.

==== Week 3 (7 November 2013) ====
- Theme: Songs from the 1990s
- Celebrity performers: John Newman ("Love Me Again"), Mika and Chiara ("Stardust")

Contestants' performances on the third live show
Part 1
Act	Order	Song	Result
Ape Escape	1	"Smells Like Teen Spirit"	Safe
Fabio Santini	2	"Everybody Hurts"	Safe
Gaia Galizia	3	"I'll Stand by You"	Safe
Alan Scaffardi	4	"Black Hole Sun"	Bottom two
Valentina Tioli	5	"Ghetto Supastar (That Is What You Are)"	Safe
Michele Bravi	6	"Cieli neri"	Safe
Part 2
Act	Order	Song	Result
Aba	7	"Why"	Bottom two
Andrea D'Alessio	8	"Digging in the Dirt"	Safe
Violetta Zironi	9	"Friday I'm in Love"	Safe
Street Clerks	10	"...Baby One More Time"	Safe
Roberta Pompa	11	"All That She Wants"	Safe
Act	Order	Song	Result
Alan Scaffardi	12	"This Time"	Eliminated
Aba	13	"I Put a Spell on You"	Safe

Judges' votes to eliminate

- Elio: Alan Scaffardi – considered Aba the best singer in the competition
- Morgan: Alan Scaffardi – found Aba's performances more convincing.
- Mika: Aba – appreciated Scaffardi's passion.
- Ventura: Alan Scaffardi – considered Aba had an untapped potential.

==== Week 4 (14 November 2013) ====
- Theme: Hell Factor (double elimination)
- Group performance: "The Passenger"
- Celebrity performers: Luca Carboni and Tiziano Ferro ("Persone silenziose"), Tom Odell ("Another Love")

Contestants' performances on the fourth live show
Part 1
Act	Order	Song	Result
Roberta Pompa	1	"True Colors"	Bottom two
Ape Escape	2	"Mentre tutto scorre"	Safe
Valentina Tioli	3	"When I Was Your Man"	Safe
Fabio Santini	4	"La casa in riva al mare"	Bottom two
Andrea D'Alessio	5	"Grease"	Safe
Final showdown detail
Act	Order	Song	Result
Roberta Pompa	6	"Cornflake Girl"	Eliminated
Fabio Santini	7	"Stuck in a Moment You Can't Get Out Of"	Safe
Part 2
Act	Order	Song	Result
Gaia Galizia	8	"Monna Lisa"	Bottom two
Street Clerks	9	"Some Nights"	Bottom two
Aba	10	"Crazy in Love"	Safe
Michele Bravi	11	"Reality"	Safe
Violetta Zironi	12	"One Day / Reckoning Song"	Safe
Final showdown detail
Act	Order	Song	Result
Gaia Galizia	13	"Every You Every Me"	Safe
Street Clerks	14	"Fix You"	Eliminated

Judges' votes to eliminate (Part 1)

- Mika: Fabio Santini – backed his own act, Roberta Pompa.
- Elio: Roberta Pompa – backed his own act, Fabio Santini.
- Morgan: Roberta Pompa – thought that Santini could have more chances in the music business.
- Ventura: Roberta Pompa – considered Santini particularly original.

Judges' votes to eliminate (Part 2)

- Mika: Street Clerks – backed his own act, Gaia Galizia.
- Ventura: Gaia Galizia – backed her own act, Street Clerks.
- Elio: Street Clerks – considered Galizia particularly interesting.
- Morgan: Gaia Galizia – could not decide so chose to take it to deadlock.

With both acts receiving two votes each, the result went to deadlock and reverted to the earlier public vote. Street Clerks were eliminated as the act with the fewest public votes.

==== Week 5 (21 November 2013) ====
- Theme: Hell Factor (double elimination)
- Group performance: "It Don't Mean a Thing (If It Ain't Got That Swing)" (with Matthew Morrison)
- Celebrity performers: Fedez ("Nuvole di fango"/"Cigno nero"/"Alfonso Signorini (eroe nazionale)") and Editors ("A Ton of Love")

Contestants' performances on the fifth live show
Round 1
Act	Order	Song	Result
Andrea D'Alessio	1	"Do It Again"	Safe
Aba	2	"Rolling in the Deep"	Safe
Valentina Tioli	3	"Dove sei"	Bottom three
Ape Escape	4	"Going Under"	Safe
Violetta Zironi	5	"Royals"	Safe
Fabio Santini	6	"Nuntereggae più"	Bottom three
Michele Bravi	7	"Mad World"	Safe
Gaia Galizia	8	"I Wish I Was a Punk Rocker (With Flowers in My Hair)"	Bottom three
Round 2
Act	Order	Song	Result
Valentina Tioli	9	"Man Down"	Eliminated
Fabio Santini	10	"Costruire"	Showdown
Gaia Galizia	11	"Celebrity Skin"	Showdown
Final showdown detail
Act	Order	Song	Result
Fabio Santini	12	"Tryin' to Get to You" (a cappella)	Eliminated
Gaia Galizia	13	"Mercedes Benz" (a cappella)	Safe

Judges' votes to eliminate

- Elio: Gaia Galizia – backed his own act, Fabio Santini.
- Mika: Fabio Santini – backed his own act, Gaia Galizia.
- Morgan: Fabio Santini – found Galizia's performances more convincing.
- Ventura: Fabio Santini – considered Galizia more deserving of staying in the competition.

==== Week 6: Quarter-final (28 November 2013) ====
- Theme: Dance performance (Round 1); Mentor's Choice (Round 2)
- Group performance: "Beautiful Day"/"Bicycle Race" (with Elio e le Storie Tese)
- Celebrity performers: Marco Mengoni ("Non passerai"/"Pronto a correre"/"L'essenziale") and Olly Murs ("Hand on Heart")

Contestants' performances on the sixth live show
Round 1
Act	Order	Song	Result
Andrea D'Alessio	1	"Rapper's Delight"	Safe
Ape Escape	2	"Don't You Worry Child"	Safe
Violetta Zironi	3	"9 to 5"	Safe
Aba	4	"When Love Takes Over"	Safe
Michele Bravi	5	"Promised Land"	Safe
Gaia Galizia	6	"Heavy Cross"	Bottom two
Round 2
Act	Order	Song	Result
Michele Bravi	7	"Red Roses for a Blue Lady"	Safe
Aba	8	"Kozmic Blues"	Safe
Andrea D'Alessio	9	"Can't Find My Way Home"	Safe
Ape Escape	10	"Yes I Know My Way"	Bottom two
Violetta Zironi	11	"Skinny Love"	Safe
Act	Order	Songs	Result
Gaia Galizia	12	"Song 2"	Eliminated
Ape Escape	13	"Madness"	Safe

Judges' votes to eliminate

- Mika: Ape Escape – backed his own act, Gaia Galizia.
- Ventura: Gaia Galizia – backed her own act, Ape Escape.
- Elio: Gaia Galizia – stated that he had preferred Ape Escape.
- Morgan: Ape Escape – considered Galizia more interesting for the music business.

With both acts receiving two votes each, the result went to deadlock and reverted to the earlier public vote. Gaia Galizia was eliminated as the act with the fewest public votes.

==== Week 7: Semi-final (5 December 2013) ====
- Theme: Previously unreleased songs (Round 1); Mentor's Choice (Round 2)
- Group performance: "Spirito e virtù" (with Morgan)
- Celebrity performers: Katy Perry ("Unconditionally")

Contestants' performances on the seventh live show
Round 1
Act	Order	Song	Writers	Result
Ape Escape	1	"Invisibili"	Andrea Bonomo, Gianluigi Fazio and Ape Escape	Safe
Andrea D'Alessio	2	"Venerdì"	Andrea D'Alessio and Gaetano Cappa	Bottom two
Violetta Zironi	3	"Dimmi che non passa"	Christian Lavoro	Safe
Aba	4	"Indifesa"	Nicky Holland, Murray James and Aba	Safe
Michele Bravi	5	"La vita e la felicità"	Tiziano Ferro and Zibba	Safe
Round 2
Act	Order	Song		Result
Violetta Zironi	6	"One"		Safe
Aba	7	"Nutbush City Limits"		Bottom two
Michele Bravi	8	"Little Wing"		Safe
Ape Escape	9	"Whatever You Want"		Safe
Final showdown detail
Act	Order	Song		Result
Andrea D'Alessio	10	"Je so' pazzo"		Eliminated
Aba	11	"One Night Only"		Safe

Judges' votes to eliminate

- Morgan: Aba – backed his own act, Andrea D'Alessio.
- Elio: Andrea D'Alessio – backed his own act, Aba.
- Ventura: Aba – considered D'Alessio more original.
- Mika: Andrea D'Alessio – could not decide so chose to take it to deadlock.

With both acts receiving two votes each, the result went to deadlock and reverted to the earlier public vote. Andrea D'Alessio was eliminated as the act with the fewest public votes.

==== Week 8: Final (12 December 2013) ====
- Theme: Celebrity duets (Round 1); Previously unreleased songs (Round 2); "My song" (own choice, Round 3)
- Group performance: "Man in the Mirror" (all X Factor acts with Mario Biondi, Elisa, Giorgia and Marco Mengoni)
- Celebrity performers: Giorgia ("Quando una stella muore"), Mika and Morgan ("Altrove"/"Relax, Take It Easy"/"Altre forme di vita"/"We Are Golden"), One Direction ("Story of My Life"), Elisa ("Ecco che")

Contestants' performances on the final live show
Round 1
Act	Order	Song		Result
Ape Escape	1	"Labyrinth" (with Elisa)		Safe
Violetta Zironi	2	"L'essenziale" (with Marco Mengoni)		Safe
Aba	3	"(They Long to Be) Close to You" (with Mario Biondi)		Fourth place
Michele Bravi	4	"Gocce di memoria" (with Giorgia)		Safe
Round 2
Act	Order	Song		Result
Violetta Zironi	5	"Dimmi che non passa"		Third place
Michele Bravi	6	"La vita e la felicità"		Safe
Ape Escape	7	"Invisibili"		Safe
Round 3
Act	Order	Song 1	Song 2	Result
Ape Escape	8	"Walk This Way"	"Tu sì 'na cosa grande" (a cappella)	Runner-up
Michele Bravi	9	"Anima fragile"	"Blue Valentines" (a cappella)	Winner
