= Different Pulses =

Studio album by Asaf Avidan
- Released: 2012 (Israel); 2013 (Europe)
- Recorded: 2011–2012
- Genres: Folk rock, blues rock, indie rock
- Labels: Telmavar Records / Columbia (Israel); Polydor-Universal Music (Europe)
- Producer: Tamir Muskat

Asaf Avidan chronology
Avidan in a Box (2012)	Different Pulses (2012)	Gold Shadow (2015)

Singles from Different Pulses
- 1. "Different Pulses" Released: 2012

Different Pulses is the first solo studio album of Israeli artist Asaf Avidan after the split-up of his band "Asaf Avidan and the Mojos". The album containing 11 tracks was released in Israel on Telmavar Records in 2012 with a European release in 2013 on Polydor-Universal Music.

== Track list ==
1. "Different Pulses" (4:30)
2. "Setting Scalpels Free" (3:41)
3. "Love It or Leave It" (4:30)
4. "Cyclamen" (4:02)
5. "613" (4:00)
6. "Thumbtacks in My Marrow" (3:27)
7. "Conspiratory Visions of Gomorrah" (5:24)
8. "A Gun & a Choice" (3:17)
9. "Turn" (4:05)
10. "The Disciple" (4:49)
11. "Is This It?" (3:40)

== Charts ==
Chart (2013–2014)	Peak position
Belgian Albums Chart (Flanders)	82
Belgian Albums Chart (Wallonia)	24
French Albums Chart	5
Italian Albums Chart	10
Swiss Albums Chart	39
