= Poor Boy / Lucky Man =

Studio album by Asaf Avidan & the Mojos
- Released: 9 September 2009 (Israel); April 2011 (France)
- Recorded: 2008–2009
- Labels: Telmavar Records (Israel); Sony-Columbia

Asaf Avidan & the Mojos chronology
The Reckoning (2008)	Poor Boy / Lucky Man (2009)	Through the Gale (2010)

Poor Boy / Lucky Man is the second album by Asaf Avidan & the Mojos. It was independently released in Israel in 2009 after the success of their debut 2008 album The Reckoning.

Released in Israel on 9/9/09 (9 September 2009), the album was originally released in two different names, covers and second track title, leaving it up to the audience to decide whether this figure was poor or lucky. Again hugely popular like The Reckoning album, it would reach gold status in Israel in five months; it garnered ecstatic reviews.

The album was released in parts of Europe in April 2011. Among others, it was album of the month on France's national FIP radio, in the newspaper Libération, and in Germany's eclipsed magazine. The album found also limited commercial success in France reaching #108 in the official Top 200 French Albums Chart, staying six weeks in the French albums chart.

== Track list ==
1. "Brickman" (3:46)
2. "Poor Boy", "Lucky Man" or "Poor Boy / Lucky Man" (4:36)
3. "Got It Right" (2:51)
4. "My Favorite Clown" (5:16)
5. "Small Change Girl" (5:03)
6. "The Ghost of a Thousand Little Lies" (5:05)
7. "Wasting My Time" (3:21)
8. "Jet Plane" (3:37)
9. "Little Stallion" (2:04)
10. "Your Anchor" (4:30)
11. "Losing Hand" (4:26)
12. "Painting on the Past" (4:01)
13. "Out in the Cold" (3:40)
14. "My Latest Sin" (9:16)

== Credits ==
- All songs written and composed by Asaf Avidan.
- Arranged by Asaf Avidan & the Mojos and Ori Winokur.
- Produced & Mixed by Ori Winokur and Asaf Avidan.
- Recorded at Ogen Studio by Ori Winokur
- Ogen assistant engineers – Yair Nisimov, Shlomi Gvili, Sharon Inbar
- Mastered at Abbey Road Studios by – Steve Rook

Instruments

- Asaf Avidan – vocals, guitar
- Hadas Kleinman – cello
- Ran Nir – bass
- Roi Peled – guitar
- Yoni Sheleg – drums

Guest artists (alphabetically):

- Marina Maximilian Blumin – B. vocals on tracks 6 & 13
- Moshe Levi – Hammond on track 2
- Shlomi Shaban – piano on tracks 5, 6 & 10
- Keren Ann Zeidel – B. vocals on track 2

Additional musicians

- Avi Schneider – trombone on tracks 1 & 11
- Sefi Zisling – trumpet on tracks 1, 4 & 11
- Yuval “Tubi” Zolotov – tuba on tracks 1 & 11

Additional instruments:

- Asaf Avidan – accordion (track 1), xylophone (track 1), harmonica (track 5)
- Hadas Kleinman – melodica (track 12)
- Roi Peled – mandolin (track 1), xylophone (track 1), didjeridoo (track 3), saz (track 3).
- All Mojos contributed backing vocals (some better than others) (tracks 1,3,4,7,8,11)
- Ori Winokur – backing vocals (track 5)
- Art & illustration – Lilach Shmilovitch
- Art & design – Roy Barazani
- Photos – Noa Magger
- Art direction – Asaf Avidan

== Charts ==
Chart (2011)	Peak position
French Albums Chart	108
