= Vs Head vs Heart =

vs Head vs Heart

Studio album by Emma Louise
- Released: 23 March 2013
- Label: Emma Louise, Arts Queensland, B1 Recordings
- Producer: Matt Redlich

Emma Louise chronology
Full Hearts & Empty Rooms (2011)	vs Head vs Heart (2013)	Supercry (2016)

Singles from vs Head vs Heart
- 1. "Boy" Released: June 2012; 2. "Freedom" Released: February 2013; 3. "Mirrors" Released: April 2013; 4. "Pontoon" Released: August 2013

vs Head vs Heart is the debut studio album by Australian recording artist Emma Louise, released independently on 23 March 2013 with Arts Queensland and distributed by MGM Records. The album debuted at number 12 on the ARIA Albums Chart.

At the ARIA Music Awards of 2013, the album was nominated for Best Female Artist.

At the Queensland Music Awards of 2013, vs Head vs Heart won Album of the Year.

Emma Louise described the cover art as expressing "the beauty that can come out of vulnerability".

Emma Louise supported the album with a 21-date vs Head vs Heart Australian tour across May and June 2013.

== Singles ==
"Boy" was released as the lead single from vs Head vs Heart on 7 June 2012. Natalie Salvo from Life Music Media opined it sat "somewhere between the pleasant, classic pop of Fleetwood Mac and the interesting layers that peppered Pajama Club's sound." The video was directed and produced by Alex Barnes and released on 19 June 2013.

The second single "Freedom", was released in February 2013, alongside the album's announcement.

The third single "Mirror", was released in late April 2013. The song tells the tale of feeling threatened by other people outside of a relationship with Emma Louise saying "I guess this song is a cowardly way to say, stay away from my man." The video was released on 3 May 2013.

"Pontoon" was released as the fourth and final single in August 2013. The video was shot throughout southeast Queensland and northern New South Wales in 2013.

The European version of the album also includes the single "Jungle" from the 2011 extended play Full Hearts & Empty Rooms and the Wanklemut remix "My Head Is a Jungle".

== Reception ==
Professional ratings
Review scores
Source	Rating
Scene Point Blank	8/10 stars

Lucia Osborne Crowley from The Music said "Emma Louise's debut album, Vs Head Vs Heart, is quietly confident, managing to be incredibly brave and humble all at once. The singer displays her raw talent for vocal tone and composition, but also establishes a willingness to push the boundaries of her genre while exploring very personal content in her insightful songs."

Zoe Radas from Beat called it "a clever album", saying "[it] manages to be thoughtful but still always pulsing with propulsion. It takes its time but utilises some fantastic electronic elements which ensure it's always moving forward in some way. "

Aideen from Scene Point Blank said "Vs Head Vs Heart is a strong debut, and has the sound of an album that captures moments of weakness and makes them sound beautiful. Even at its most contemplative and low this album is a compulsive listen. Sometimes vulnerability can be a very good thing.

== Track listing ==
Australian release
No.	Title	Writer(s)	Length
1.	"17 Hours"	Emma Louise Lobb	4:47
2.	"Atlas Eyes"	Lobb	4:59
3.	"Boy"	Lobb	4:32
4.	"Stainache"	Lobb	5:23
5.	"Mirrors"	Lobb	3:50
6.	"Freedom"	Lobb	4:09
7.	"Braces"	Lobb	2:46
8.	"Cages"	Lobb	4:45
9.	"Pontoon"	Lobb	4:45
10.	"To Keep Me Warm"	Lobb	8:55

European release
No.	Title	Writer(s)	Length
1.	""Jungle""	Lobb	3:23
2.	"17 Hours"	Lobb	4:47
3.	"Atlas Eyes"	Lobb	4:59
4.	"Boy"	Lobb	4:32
5.	"Stainache"	Lobb	5:23
6.	"Mirrors"	Lobb	3:50
7.	"Freedom"	Lobb	4:09
8.	"Braces"	Lobb	2:46
9.	"Cages"	Lobb	4:45
10.	"Pontoon"	Lobb	4:45
11.	"To Keep Me Warm"	Lobb	5:05
12.	"My Head Is a Jungle" (bonus track) (with Wankelmut)	Lobb; Jacob Dilßner; Taan Newjam	3:34

European 2014 re-release (Bonus disc)
No.	Title	Length
1.	"Nightsong"	4:22

== Charts ==
Chart (2013–15)	Peak position
Australian Albums (ARIA)	12
French Albums (SNEP)	87
USA Top Heatseers (Billboard)	13

== Release history ==
Region	Date	Format	Edition(s)	Label	Catalogue
Australia	23 March 2013	CD; digital download	Standard	Emma Louise, Arts Queensland, MGM Records	EL003
Europe	March 2013	CD; digital download	European version	B1 Recordings, UMA	060253739132 5
France	10 November 2014	CD; digital download	European version + Bonus single	UMA, Island Records	060253739132 5 + 4706338
