= Asaf Avidan =

Israeli singer and songwriter (born 1980)

Asaf Avidan אסף אבידן
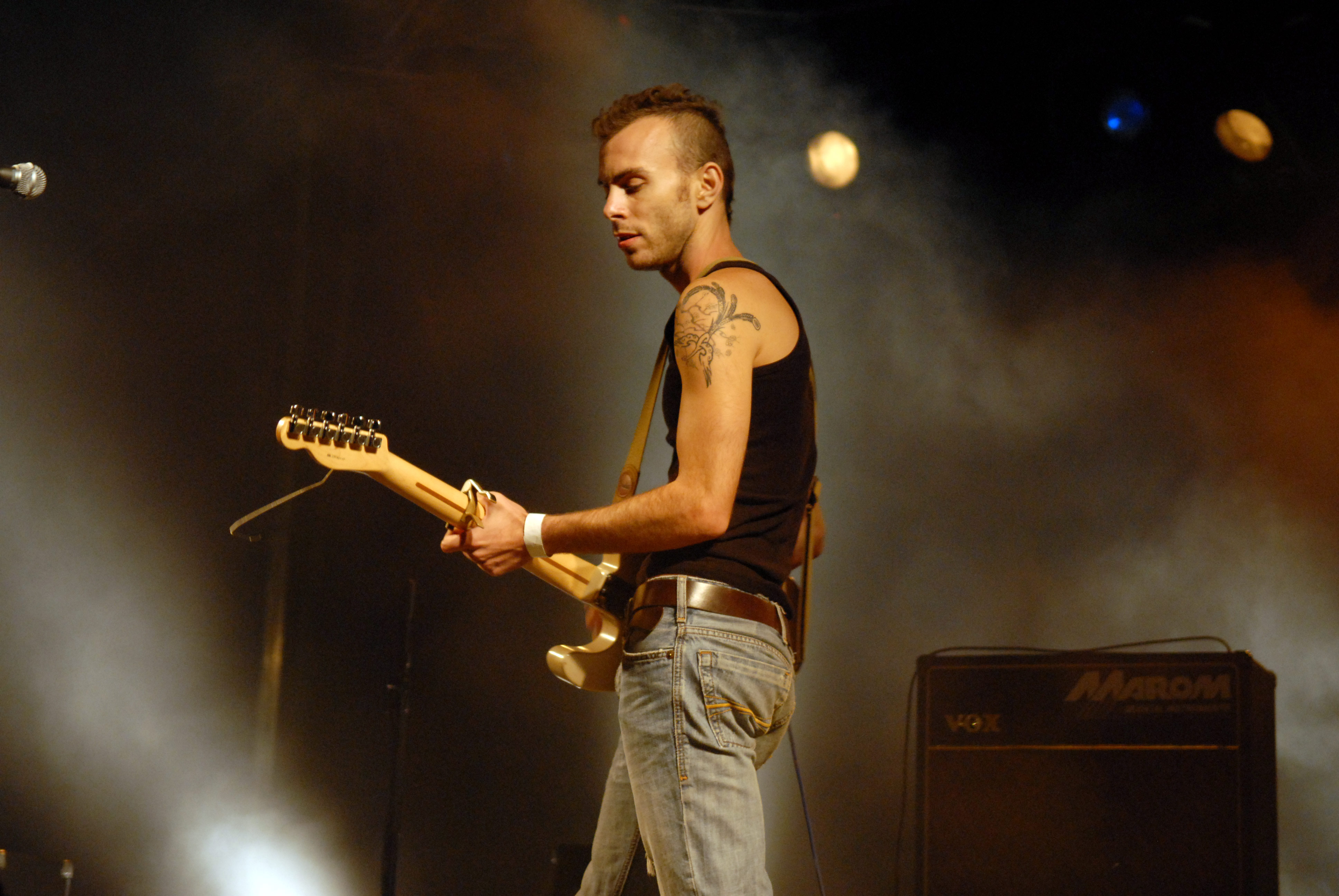
- Asaf Avidan

Background information
- Born: March 23, 1980 (age 46); Jerusalem, Israel
- Genre: Indie
- Instruments: Vocals; guitar; harmonica; piano
- Years active: 2000s–present
- Labels: Telmavar; Fiction; UMG
- Website: www.asafavidan.com

Asaf Avidan (Hebrew: אסף אבידן) is an Israeli singer and songwriter, born in Jerusalem, Israel, raised in Jamaica and currently resides in France.

From 2006 to 2011, he was part of the band Asaf Avidan & the Mojos, independently releasing three studio albums. Their debut record, The Reckoning, was certified Gold in Israel following release, and a 2012 remix, One Day / Reckoning Song by Wankelmut, was certified Gold and Platinum in multiple countries.

In 2012, Avidan started a solo career.

== Life and career ==
=== 1980–2006: Early life and career ===
Asaf Avidan was born in Jerusalem. Avidan's grandparents emigrated from Romania to Israel. He spent 4 years of his youth in Jamaica.

He completed mandatory army service in the Israel Defense Forces, and studied animation at Jerusalem's Bezalel Academy of Arts and Design, with his final project short film "Find Love Now" winning an award at the Haifa Film Festival that year. Subsequently, Avidan moved to Tel Aviv and worked as an animator. In 2006, after breaking up with his long-time girlfriend, he moved back to Jerusalem, releasing his first EP Now That You're Leaving later that year.

=== 2006–2011: Asaf Avidan & the Mojos ===
Asaf Avidan & the Mojos
- Origin: Israel
- Genre: Indie
- Years active: 2006–2011
- Label: Independent
- Past members: Asaf Avidan; Ran Nir; Yoni Sheleg; Roi Peled; Hadas Kleinman
- Website: www.asafavidan.com

In late 2006, while on tour in Israel, Avidan and Ran Nir decided to put together a band, who would consist of Nir on bass guitar, Yoni Sheleg (Johnny Snow) on drums, Roi Peled on guitar and backing vocals, Hadas Kleinman on cello, and Avidan on lead vocals, guitar and harmonica. The group's original name was Asaf Avidan & the Mojo Jive Cats, but it was soon after shortened to Asaf Avidan & the Mojos.

The group released their debut studio album The Reckoning independently in March 2008, founding Telmavar Records with Avidan's brother Roie. The album was met with critical and commercial acclaim, reaching Gold status in Israel. It was aided by two singles — "Reckoning Song" and "Weak" — as well as by a tour throughout Europe. Later in 2012, a remix of "Reckoning Song" by German disc jockey Wankelmut — retitled into "One Day / Reckoning Song" — would attain widespread commercial success, topping the charts and being certified Gold and Platinum in countries including Germany, Italy and Netherlands. The single's attention would lead to The Reckoning entering the record charts in various European regions in 2012.

Poor Boy / Lucky Man, the band's second album, was released in Israel in September 2009 to favorable reviews. For promotion, the band embarked on a worldwide tour from 2009 to 2011, during which they had appeared and performed on several notable occasions in Germany, France, China and the United States. Meanwhile, Asaf Avidan and the Mojos premiered their third and last record Through the Gale in November 2010. In 2012, following the group taking a short break, Avidan announced the group would disband to allow him to pursue a solo career.

=== 2012–present: Solo career ===
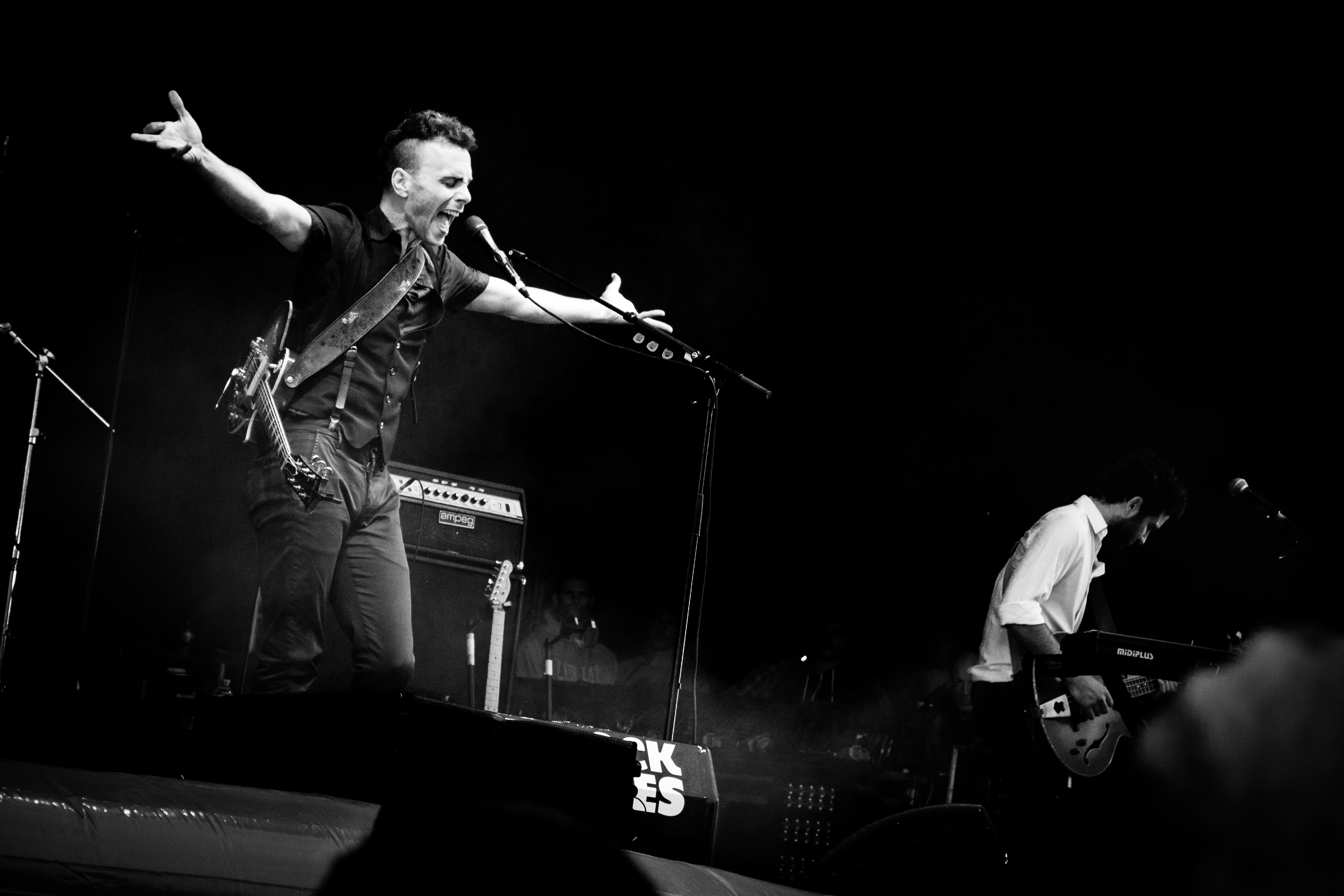
Avidan performing at the French rock festival Eurockéennes de Belfort in 2013.

In 2012, Avidan released the single "Different Pulses", followed by the release of his debut solo studio album of the same name. For promotion, the singer embarked on a European tour where he also performed during the 2013 Sanremo Music Festival in Italy. Different Pulses entered record charts in various countries and was awarded a Platinum certification by France's Syndicat National de l'Édition Phonographique (SNEP). The singer's follow-up record Gold Shadow (2015) was also attained Gold status in France. The album was also aided by several venues, including in Boston, United States. The Study on Falling followed in 2017. In the same year, Avidan was featured on the song "Baila Leila" from Goran Bregović's Three Letters from Sarajevo (2017).

== Debate ==
In a March 2015 interview conducted by French newspaper Le Monde, Avidan stated: "I don't really feel Israeli. As Israelis, what unites us is the fear. We are always the persecuted, and that is why I am no longer interested in living in Israel, to not feel that fear". The singer's statement sparked controversy and received widespread commentary and media attention in Israel, prompting Avidan to respond by saying: "In every interview I gave from the first second I always said I am not an Israeli artist, but an artist from Israel. I am not coming to represent Israel. I am not a politician. I am not a diplomat. And as a son to diplomats I never wanted to be one".

In 2023, Avidan applied for Romanian citizenship, because his grandparents were Romanian Jews. On June 12, 2026, he was granted Romanian citizenship.

== Discography ==
=== As part of Asaf Avidan & the Mojos ===
==== Studio albums ====
| Title | Album details | Peak chart positions | | | | | | | Sales | Certifications |
| Title | Album details | AUT | BEL (Fl) | BEL (Wa) | FRA | GER | ITA | SWI | Sales | Certifications |
|---|---|---|---|---|---|---|---|---|---|---|
| The Reckoning | Label: Telmavar, Columbia; Released: 2008 (Israel) / 2012 (Europe); Formats: CD, digital download | 31 | 91 | 93 | 26 | 23 | 70 | 33 | ISR: +20,000 | IFPI ISR: Gold |
| Poor Boy / Lucky Man | Label: Telmavar, Columbia; Released: 2009 (Israel) / 2011 (France); Formats: CD, digital download | — | — | — | 108 | — | — | — | | |
| Through the Gale | Label: Telmavar; Released: 2010 (Israel); Formats: CD, digital download | — | — | — | — | — | — | — | | |
"—" denotes an album that did not chart or was not released in that territory.

==== Singles ====
| Title | Year | Album |
|---|---|---|
| "Reckoning Song" (Only in Israel) | 2008 | Non-album singles |
| "Weak" (Only in Israel) | 2008 | Non-album singles |

=== Solo ===
==== Albums ====
Studio albums

| Title | Album details | Peak chart positions | | | | | | Certifications |
| Title | Album details | BEL (Fl) | BEL (Wa) | FRA | GER | ITA | SWI | Certifications |
|---|---|---|---|---|---|---|---|---|
| Different Pulses | Label: Telmavar, Columbia, Polydor, Universal; Released: 2012 (Israel) / 2013 (Europe); Format: CD, digital download | 82 | 24 | 5 | — | 10 | 39 | SNEP: Platinum |
| Gold Shadow | Label: Telmavar, Columbia, Polydor, Universal; Released: 12 January 2015; Format: CD, digital download | 102 | 24 | 3 | 75 | 54 | 12 | SNEP: Gold |
| The Study on Falling | Label: Telmavar; Released: 3 November 2017; Format: CD, digital download | — | 39 | 11 | — | — | 18 | |
| Anagnorisis | Label: Telmavar, Embassy of Music; Released: 11 September 2020; Format: CD, vinyl, digital download | — | 48 | 21 | 100 | — | 11 | |
| Unfurl | Label: Telmavar, Embassy of Music; Released: 10 October 2025; Format: CD, vinyl, digital download | 168 | 154 | — | — | — | 65 | |
"—" denotes an album that did not chart or was not released in that territory.

Live albums

| Title | Album details |
|---|---|
| Avidan in a Box | Label: Telmavar / Columbia; Released: 2012 (Israel) / 2013 (Europe); Format: CD, digital download |

==== Extended plays ====
| Title | EP details |
|---|---|
| Now That You're Leaving | Label: Telmavar; Released: 2006 (Israel); Format: CD, digital download |

==== Singles ====
| Title | Year | Peak chart positions | | | | | | | | | Certifications | Album |
| Title | Year | AUT | BEL (Fl) | FRA | GER | ITA | NLD | SWE | SWI | UK | Certifications | Album |
|---|---|---|---|---|---|---|---|---|---|---|---|---|
| "One Day / Reckoning Song" (Wankelmut Remix) | 2012 | 1 | 1 | 2 | 1 | 1 | 1 | 8 | 1 | 30 | BEA: Platinum; BVMI: Platinum; FIMI: 4× Platinum; GLF: 3× Platinum; IFPI AUT: Platinum; IFPI SWI: 3× Platinum; SNEP: Platinum | The Reckoning (re-release) |
| "Different Pulses" | 2012 | — | 88 | 44 | — | — | — | — | — | — | | Different Pulses |
| "Love It or Leave It" | 2013 | — | 122 | 103 | — | — | — | — | — | — | | Different Pulses |
| "Over My Head" | 2014 | — | — | 107 | — | — | — | — | — | — | | Gold Shadow |
| "Gold Shadow" | 2015 | — | — | 114 | — | — | — | — | — | — | | Gold Shadow |
| "My Old Pain" | 2017 | — | — | 36 | — | — | — | — | — | — | | The Study on Falling |
"—" denotes a single that did not chart or was not released in that territory.
