= The Reckoning (Asaf Avidan & the Mojos album) =

Studio album by Asaf Avidan & the Mojos
- Released: 2008 (Israel); 15 January 2010 (Europe); 17 August 2012 (re-release)
- Recorded: 2006–2008
- Label: Telmavar Records (Israel); Sony/Columbia

Asaf Avidan & the Mojos chronology
The Reckoning (2008)	Poor Boy / Lucky Man (2009)

Singles from The Reckoning
- 1. "Reckoning Song" Released: 2008; 2. "Weak" Released: 2008

The Reckoning is an album by the Israeli band Asaf Avidan & the Mojos, released in Israel in 2008. The album's 15 tracks blended rock, folk and blues with Avidan's lyrics about relationships and betrayal. The album was certified gold status in a year, and platinum later, and would eventually become the biggest selling "independent" record of all time in Israel. It was chosen as Album of the Year (2008) by various media, including Time Out Tel Aviv.

"Reckoning Song" was the first single released from the album in Israel. It would eventually become a huge international hit for Asaf Avidan retitled and remixed as "One Day / Reckoning Song (Wankelmut Rmx)".

"Weak", the second single of the album, became a huge radio hit and its video was "Video of the Year" on Israel's music channel. "Weak" would also be the title song of the film L'Arbre (English title The Tree) by Julie Bertuccelli, which starred Charlotte Gainsbourg and was the closing film at Cannes Film Festival 2010.

== Track listing ==
Telmavar release (2008)

1. "Maybe You Are" (2:44)
2. "Hangwoman" (3:02)
3. "Her Lies" (3:51)
4. "Weak" (3:33)
5. "Reckoning Song" (2:46)
6. "Sweat & Tears" (3:32)
7. "Rubberband Girl" (2:55)
8. "A Phoenix Is Born" (1:03)
9. "Over You Blues" (2:57)
10. "Empty Handed Saturday Blues" (4:06)
11. "A Ghost Before the Wall" (3:11)
12. "Growing Tall" (3:26)
13. "Little More Time" (5:11)
14. "Devil's Dance" (3:32)
15. "Of Scorpions & Bells" (4:34)

- "The Devil and Me" [hidden track] (3:06)

Columbia re-release (2012)

16. "One Day / Reckoning Song" (Wankelmut remix) [radio edit] (bonus track) (3:32)

== Personnel ==
- All songs written and composed by Asaf Avidan
- Arranged by Asaf Avidan & the Mojos and Ori Winokur
- Produced by Ori Winokur and Asaf Avidan
- Recorded & mixed at Ogen Studio by Yair Nisimov & Sharon Inbar
- Mastered at Kevorkian Mastering by Fred Kevorkian

The Mojos

- Asaf Avidan – vocals, guitar
- Roi Peled – guitar
- Ran Nir – bass
- Hadas Kleinman – cello
- Joni Snow (Yoni Sheleg) – drums

Special guests

- Ronit Rolland – piano & accordion on track 15
- Tamar Eisenman – Backing vocals on track 6

Other

- Album & cover design by Michelle Rolland
- All illustrations by Lilach Shmilovitch
- Center photo by Omri Barel

== Charts ==
=== Weekly charts ===
Chart (2012–2013)	Peak position
Austrian Albums (Ö3 Austria)	31
Belgian Albums (Ultratop Flanders)	91
Belgian Albums (Ultratop Wallonia)	93
French Albums (SNEP)	26
German Albums (Offizielle Top 100)	23
Italian Albums (FIMI)	70
Swiss Albums (Schweizer Hitparade)	33

=== Weekly charts ===
Chart (2013)	Position
French Albums (SNEP)	97
