= Ocean Alley discography =

Discography of Australian group Ocean Alley

- Studio albums: 5
- EPs: 4
- Live albums: 1
- Singles: 26

The discography of Australian alternative psychedelic rock band Ocean Alley, consists of 5 studio albums, 1 live album and 4 extended plays. They are best known for the 2018 single "Confidence".

== Albums ==
=== Studio albums ===
List of studio albums, with release date and selected chart positions and certifications shown
Title	Album details	Peak chart positions		Certifications
Title	Album details	AUS	NZ	Certifications
Lost Tropics	Released: 13 May 2016 (Australia); Label: Ocean Alley; Formats: CD, digital download, streaming	70	—	
Chiaroscuro	Released: 9 March 2018 (Australia); Label: Community Music (OA001CD); Formats: CD, digital download, streaming	11	—	ARIA: Gold
Lonely Diamond	Released: 19 June 2020; Label: Community Music (OA002CD); Formats: CD, digital download, streaming	3	—	
Low Altitude Living	Released: 14 October 2022; Label: Community Music (OA003CD); Formats: CD, digital download, streaming	3	5	
Love Balloon	Released: 19 September 2025; Label: Community Music (OA004CD); Formats: CD, digital download, streaming	3	13	

=== Live albums ===
List of live albums
Title	Album details
Live in Melbourne '23	Released: 19 December 2025; Label: Ocean Alley; Formats: digital download, streaming

== EPs ==
List of EPs released, with year released and label shown
Title	EP details	Peak chart positions
Title	EP details	AUS
Yellow Mellow	Released: 8 September 2013; Label: Independent; Format: CD, digital download, LP (2017)	41
In Purple	Released: 28 August 2015; Label: Independent; Format: CD, digital download, LP	50
Ocean Alley - Audio Tree Live	Released: July 2019; Label: Audiotree; Format: Digital download, streaming	—
Triple J Live at the Wireless	Released: 29 May 2020; Label: Australian Broadcasting Corporation; Format: Digital download, streaming	—

== Singles ==
List of singles, with year released, selected chart positions and certifications, and album name shown
Title	Year	Peak chart positions				Certifications	Album
Title	Year	AUS	JJJ Hottest 100	MEX Ang. Air.	NZ Hot	Certifications	Album
"Space Goat"	2015	—	—	—	—		In Purple
"Muddy Water"	2015	—	—	—	—		In Purple
"Holiday"	2016	—	—	—	—	ARIA: Platinum; RMNZ: Platinum	Lost Tropics
"Lemonworld"	2016	—	—	—	—	ARIA: Platinum; RMNZ: 2× Platinum	Lost Tropics
"Overgrown"	2017	—	—	—	—		Chiaroscuro
"The Comedown"	2017	—	48	—	—	RMNZ: Platinum	Chiaroscuro
"Confidence"	2018	9	1 (Note: "Confidence" has polled at No. 1 in the Hottest 100 of 2017, No. 35 of the Hottest 100 of the 2010s (2020), and No. 65 in the Hottest 100 of Australian Songs (2025).)	—	16	ARIA: 6× Platinum; RMNZ: 6× Platinum	Chiaroscuro
"Bones"	2018	—	—	—	—		Chiaroscuro
"Knees"	2018	—	10	—	—	ARIA: 3× Platinum; RMNZ: 2× Platinum	Chiaroscuro
"Baby Come Back" (Triple J Like a Version)	2018	91	3 (Note: "Baby Come Back" has polled at No. 16 in the Hottest 100 of 2017 and No. 3 in the Hottest 100 of Like a Version (2023).)	—	—	RMNZ: Platinum	Non-album single
"Happy Sad"	2018	—	100	—	—	RMNZ: Gold	Chiaroscuro
"Stained Glass"	2019	—	54	—	26		Lonely Diamond
"Infinity"	2019	—	24	—	17	RMNZ: Gold	Lonely Diamond
"Tombstone"	2019	—	14	—	7	ARIA: Platinum; RMNZ: Platinum	Lonely Diamond
"Hot Chicken"	2020	—	—	—	31		Lonely Diamond
"Way Down"	2020	— (Note: "Way Down" did not enter the ARIA Top 50 Singles Chart, but peaked at number 18 on the Australian Artists Singles Chart.)	72	—	5		Lonely Diamond
"Breathe / Comfortably Numb / Money" (Triple J Like a Version)	2021	—	24 (Note: "Breathe/Comfortably Numb/Money" has polled at No. 54 in the Hottest 100 of 2021 and No. 24 in the Hottest 100 of Like a Version (2023).)	—	39		Non-album single
"Touch Back Down"	2021	—	20	—	15	ARIA: Gold; RMNZ: Gold	Low Altitude Living
"Deepest Darkness"	2022	—	56	—	27		Low Altitude Living
"Home"	2022	—	62	—	26		Low Altitude Living
"Double Vision"	2022	—	59	—	25		Low Altitude Living
"Tangerine"	2024	—	15	—	15		Love Balloon
"Left of the Dealer"	2025	—	87	—	—		Love Balloon
"Love Balloon"	2025	81	17	19	16	ARIA: Gold	Love Balloon
"Drenched"	2025	—	44	—	6		Love Balloon
"First Blush"	2026	—	43	—	10		Love Balloon

=== Other charted and certified songs ===
List of other charted and certified songs, with year released, peak chart positions, certifications, and album name shown
Title	Year	Peak chart positions	Certifications	Album
Title	Year	NZ Hot	Certifications	Album
"Partner in Crime"	2016	—	ARIA: Gold; RMNZ: Platinum	Lost Tropics
"Ain't No Use"	2025	18		Love Balloon
"Sweet Boy"	2025	21		Love Balloon

== See also ==
- Music of Australia
