= Like a Version =

Live music segment on Triple J

- Genre: Live music
- Running time: Around 8:00 am every Friday
- Country of origin: Australia
- Home station: Triple J
- Hosted by: Abby Butler and Tyrone Pynor
- Created by: Mel Bampton
- Original release: 2004 – present
- Website: www.abc.net.au/triplej/like-a-version/
- Podcast: Official website

Like a Version is a long-running weekly segment on Australian youth radio station Triple J. It involves musicians playing two songs in the studio: one of their own songs and then a cover version.

The series was created by presenter Mel Bampton in 2004 as part of the Mel in the Morning program. The title is wordplay on the song "Like a Virgin" by Madonna. Early performances were more intimate, with most covers in the first years featuring only acoustic instruments, but as the segment has evolved, recordings have moved into larger studios to accommodate full bands.

The segment has grown in popularity over the years, leading to the release of compilation CDs featuring the covers. Some particularly well-received covers have made it into annual Triple J Hottest 100 polls – in the 2021 countdown, the Wiggles made history as their cover of Tame Impala's "Elephant" became the first Like a Version to take out the number one spot. In 2023, Triple J celebrated 20 years of the segment with a one-off Triple J Hottest 100 of Like a Version, which was won by the DMA's cover of Cher's "Believe".

== Volume One (2005) ==
23-track compilation CD released in 2005 by ABC Music.

1. Grinspoon – "The Drugs Don't Work" (Richard Ashcroft)
2. The Pictures – "Milkshake" (Pharrell Williams/Chad Hugo)
3. Jebediah – "Raindrops Keep Fallin' on My Head" (Burt Bacharach/Hal David)
4. Salmonella Dub – "Get Up, Stand Up" (Bob Marley/Peter Tosh)
5. Speedstar – "There Is a Light That Never Goes Out" (Steven Morrissey/Johnny Marr)
6. Little Birdy – "These Boots Are Made for Walkin'" (Lee Hazlewood)
7. The Cat Empire – "Hotel California" (Don Felder/Don Henley/Glenn Frey)
8. End of Fashion – "Quicksand" (David Bowie)
9. Bertie Blackman – "Tyrone" (Erica Wright/N. Hurt)
10. Goodshirt – "Gouge Away" (The Pixies)
11. Love Outside Andromeda – "Andy Warhol" (David Bowie)
12. Darren Hanlon – "Don't Stop" (Christine McVie)
13. Damien Rice – "When Doves Cry" (Prince) (contains a portion of Led Zeppelin's "Babe I'm Gonna Leave You" (Anne Bredon/Jimmy Page & Robert Plant)
14. John Butler Trio – "Message in a Bottle" (Sting)
15. Gorgeous – "Little Suicides" (Anton Fier/Lori Carson)
16. Lazy Susan – "Are You Old Enough" (Paul Hewson)
17. Betchadupa – "Sweet Dreams" (Philip Judd)
18. Starky – "Show a Sign of Life" (Josh Malerman/Mark Owen)
19. Serena Ryder – "Illegal Smile" (John Prine)
20. Missy Higgins – "Moses" (Patty Griffin)
21. Big Heavy Stuff – "Hyperballad" (Björk)
22. Donavon Frankenreiter – "Stay Young" (Graham Lyle/Benny Gallagher)
23. Clare Bowditch – "Hallelujah" (Leonard Cohen)

== Volume Two (2006) ==
22-track compilation CD released in 2006 by ABC Music.

1. Gyroscope – "Monument" (Jebediah)
2. The Herd – "I Was Only 19" (Redgum)
3. Eels – "I Could Never Take the Place of Your Man" (Prince)
4. Sophie Koh – "Creep" (Radiohead)
5. Spoon – "Upwards at 45 Degrees" (Julian Cope)
6. Sarah Blasko – "Goodbye Yellow Brick Road" (Elton John)
7. The Drones – "Words from a Woman to Her Man" (Beasts of Bourbon)
8. Lior – "The Needle and the Damage Done" (Neil Young)
9. Holidays on Ice – "The Holiday Song" (The Pixies)
10. Crooked Fingers – "Long Black Veil" (Lefty Frizzell/Johnny Cash)
11. Tegan and Sara – "Dancing in the Dark" (Bruce Springsteen)
12. Evermore – "Relapse" (Little Birdy)
13. Holly Throsby – "Mistress" (Red House Painters)
14. 67 Special – "Scar" (Missy Higgins)
15. Live@Subs – "Rolled Up" (Long Beach Dub Allstars)
16. Mia Dyson – "Can't Let Go" (Lucinda Williams)
17. The Panda Band – "My Mistake" (Split Enz)
18. The Mountain Goats – "Wild World" (The Birthday Party)
19. Kate Miller-Heidke – "Little Water Song" (Ute Lemper/Nick Cave/Bruno Pisek)
20. The Tea Party – "The Maker" (Daniel Lanois)
21. New Buffalo – "Don't Let Me Be Misunderstood" (Nina Simone)
22. Willy Mason – "The Way I Am" (Merle Haggard)

== Volume Three (2007) ==
20-track compilation CD and 10 video DVD released in 2007 by ABC Music.

1. Ben Folds – "Such Great Heights" (The Postal Service)
2. Sharon Jones – "This Land Is Your Land" (Woody Guthrie)
3. Eskimo Joe – "Hey" (Pixies)
4. Josh Pyke – "House at Pooh Corner" (Nitty Gritty Dirt Band)
5. The Magic Numbers – "Crazy in Love" (Beyoncé)
6. Bob Evans – "Beautiful to Me" (Little Birdy)
7. Mattafix – "Boulevard of Broken Dreams" (Green Day)
8. The Bellrays – "Highway to Hell" (AC/DC)
9. Shout Out Louds – "Streams of Whiskey" (The Pogues)
10. Pivot – "Woman" (Wolfmother)
11. Custom Kings – "The Boys of Summer" (Don Henley)
12. SubAudible Hum – "Africa" (Toto)
13. Gomez – "Breakfast in America" (Supertramp)
14. Blue King Brown – "You Don't Love Me (No, No, No)" (Dawn Penn)
15. The Kill Devil Hills – "Look at Miss Ohio" (Gillian Welch)
16. The Zutons – "Runaway" (Del Shannon)
17. Macromantics – "Jump" (Kris Kross)
18. Broken Social Scene – "Kennel District" (Pavement)
19. Angus and Julia Stone – "Tubthumping" (Chumbawamba)
20. Something for Kate – "Rock the Casbah" (The Clash)

== Volume Four (2008) ==
19-track compilation CD and 14 video DVD released in 2008 by ABC Music.

1. Regina Spektor – "Real Love" (John Lennon)
2. Katalyst featuring Stephanie McKay – "Hang Me Up to Dry" (Cold War Kids)
3. The Panics – "Wide Open Road" (The Triffids)
4. C. W. Stoneking – "Seven Nation Army" (The White Stripes)
5. British India – "And I Was A Boy From School" (Hot Chip)
6. Plan B – "Stop Me If You Think You've Heard This One Before" (The Smiths)
7. Crowded House – "Everybody's Talkin''" (Harry Nilsson)
8. Saosin – "Time After Time" (Cyndi Lauper)
9. Lou Rhodes – "Satellite" (Elliott Smith)
10. Dappled Cities – "More Than a Woman" (Bee Gees)
11. Bit by Bats – "Orinoco Flow" (Enya)
12. After The Fall – "Only the Good Die Young" (Billy Joel)
13. Paul Kelly – "Rehab" (Amy Winehouse)
14. Snowman – "Strange Fruit" (Billie Holiday)
15. The Veils – "State Trooper" (Bruce Springsteen)
16. Nouvelle Vague – "Ever Fallen in Love (With Someone You Shouldn't've)" (Buzzcocks)
17. Jamie T – "Hoover Street" (Rancid)
18. Little Barrie – "White Light/White Heat" (The Velvet Underground)
19. Émilie Simon – "I Wanna Be Your Dog" (The Stooges)

== Volume Five (2009) ==
20-track compilation CD and 14-track DVD released in November 2009 by ABC Music.

1. The Kooks – "Kids" (MGMT)
2. Bob Evans – "Not Fair" (Lily Allen)
3. Ben Harper and Relentless7 – "Under Pressure" (Queen and David Bowie)
4. Lisa Mitchell – "Romeo and Juliet" (Dire Straits)
5. Sparkadia – "This Boy's in Love" (The Presets)
6. Urthboy – "London Calling" (The Clash)
7. Philadelphia Grand Jury – "99 Problems" (Jay-Z)
8. Little Birdy – "Do Right Woman" (Aretha Franklin)
9. Whitley – "Dancing Queen" (ABBA)
10. TZU – "Heavy Heart" (You Am I)
11. The Drones – "Suicide Is Painless" (Johnny Mandel – theme from M*A*S*H)
12. The Wombats – "There She Goes" (The La's)
13. Tiki Taane – "Use Somebody" (Kings of Leon)
14. Liam Finn and EJ Barnes – "Old Man" (Neil Young)
15. Bertie Blackman – "In the Air Tonight" (Phil Collins)
16. Bluejuice – "Every Little Step" (Bobby Brown)
17. Kisschasy – "Alex Chilton" (The Replacements)
18. Mat McHugh and The Blackbird – "Only You" (Yazoo)
19. Hermitude – "Joga" (Björk)
20. Holly Throsby – "Berlin Chair" (You Am I)

=== Weekly charts ===
Chart (2010)	Peak position
Australian Albums (ARIA)	29

== Volume Six (2010) ==
21-track compilation CD and 16-track DVD released in October 2010 by ABC Music.

1. The Temper Trap – "Dancing In The Dark" (Bruce Springsteen)
2. Basement Birds – "My People" (The Presets)
3. Grizzly Bear – "Boy from School" (Hot Chip)
4. Washington – "Santeria" (Sublime)
5. Mumford and Sons – "Unfinished Business" (White Lies)
6. The Last Kinection – "Rhythm Is a Dancer" (Snap!)
7. John Butler Trio – "I Want You Back" (The Jackson 5)
8. Yves Klein Blue – "Walk On The Wild Side" (Lou Reed)
9. Jonathan Boulet – "Colour Television" (Eddy Current Suppression Ring)
10. Old Man River – "Clap Your Hands" (Sia)
11. Jen Cloher and Jordie Lane – "Electric Feel" (MGMT)
12. Darren Hanlon – "Together in Electric Dreams" (Philip Oakey)
13. Band of Skulls – "Strict Machine" (Goldfrapp)
14. Space Invadas – "Sweet Disposition" (The Temper Trap)
15. OK Go – "Wave of Mutilation" (The Pixies)
16. Alexisonfire – "(I'm) Stranded" (The Saints)
17. Cloud Control – "Pursuit Of Happiness" (Kid Cudi)
18. The Boat People – "Bulletproof" (La Roux)
19. Grinspoon – "When You Were Mine" (Prince)
20. Miami Horror – "The Logical Song" (Supertramp)
21. Regina Spektor – "No Surprises" (Radiohead)

=== Weekly charts ===
Chart (2010)	Peak position
Australian Albums (ARIA)	2

=== Year-end charts ===
Chart (2010)	Position
Australian Albums (ARIA)	78

=== Certifications ===
Region	Certification	Certified units/sales
Australia (ARIA)	Gold	35,000^{^}
^{^} Shipments figures based on certification alone.

== Volume Seven (2011) ==
23-track compilation CD and 15-track DVD released in November 2011 by ABC Music.

1. Owl Eyes – "Pumped Up Kicks" (Foster the People)
2. Plan B – "Runaway" (Kanye West)
3. Art vs. Science – "Harder, Better, Faster, Stronger" (Daft Punk)
4. Andy Bull – "Everybody Wants to Rule the World" (Tears for Fears)
5. Busby Marou – "Girls Just Want to Have Fun" (Cyndi Lauper)
6. Sarah Blasko – "Hey Ya!" (OutKast)
7. Dialectrix – "Buy My A Pony" (Spiderbait)
8. Kaiser Chiefs – "Record Collection" (Mark Ronson and the Business Intl.)
9. Stonefield – "Magic Carpet Ride" (Steppenwolf)
10. Angus and Julia Stone – "Say It Right" (Nelly Furtado)
11. Eskimo Joe – "Somebody That I Used to Know" (Gotye and Kimbra)
12. Children Collide – "Reckless" (Australian Crawl)
13. Adalita – "Burning Up" (Madonna)
14. The Vines – "Clint Eastwood" (Gorillaz)
15. Eagle and the Worm – "Tightrope" (Janelle Monáe and Big Boi)
16. The Kills – "One Silver Dollar" (Marilyn Monroe)
17. Oh Mercy – "Evil Woman" (Electric Light Orchestra)
18. Gossling – "Dance the Way I Feel" (Ou Est le Swimming Pool)
19. Paul Dempsey – "Daniel" (Bat For Lashes)
20. Calling All Cars – "Don't Sit Down 'Cause I've Moved Your Chair" (Arctic Monkeys)
21. The Beards – "Sharp Dressed Man" (ZZ Top)
22. Sally Seltmann – "You're So Vain" (Carly Simon)
23. The Seabellies – "Am I Ever Gonna See Your Face Again?" (The Angels)

=== Weekly charts ===
Chart (2011)	Peak position
Australian Albums (ARIA)	5

=== Year-end charts ===
Chart (2011)	Position
Australian Albums (ARIA)	24
Chart (2012)	Position
Australian Albums (ARIA)	43

=== Certifications ===
Region	Certification	Certified units/sales
Australia (ARIA)	Platinum	70,000^{^}
^{^} Shipments figures based on certification alone.

== Volume Eight (2012) ==
21-track compilation CD and 14-track DVD released in October 2012 by ABC Music.

1. Bluejuice – "Video Games" (Lana Del Rey)
2. Hilltop Hoods – "So What'cha Want" (Beastie Boys)
3. Boy and Bear – "Walking on a Dream" (Empire of the Sun)
4. City and Colour – "Settle Down" (Kimbra)
5. Missy Higgins – "Hearts a Mess" (Gotye)
6. Electric Guest – "Ritual Union" (Little Dragon)
7. Austra – "None Of Dem" (Robyn)
8. Husky – "Need You Tonight" (INXS)
9. Jinja Safari – "Ignition (Remix)" (R. Kelly)
10. Josh Pyke – "Endless Summer" (The Jezabels)
11. The Herd featuring Radical Son, Nooky and Sky High – "A Change Is Gonna Come" (Sam Cooke)
12. Matt Corby – "Lonely Boy" (The Black Keys)
13. Julia Stone – "Feeding Line" (Boy and Bear)
14. Deep Sea Arcade – "Let Forever Be" (The Chemical Brothers)
15. Jebediah – "Apartment" (Custard)
16. Ladyhawke – "White Rabbit" (Jefferson Airplane)
17. Bon Iver – "Coming Down" (Anaïs Mitchell)
18. Active Child – "Sweet Dreams (Are Made of This)" (Eurythmics)
19. Cosmo Jarvis – "Spinning Around" (Kylie Minogue)
20. Thundamentals – "Brother" (Matt Corby)
21. The Medics – "Blowin' in the Wind" (Bob Dylan)

=== Weekly charts ===
Chart (2012)	Peak position
Australian Albums (ARIA)	3

=== Year-end charts ===
Chart (2012)	Position
Australian Albums (ARIA)	34

=== Certifications ===
Region	Certification	Certified units/sales
Australia (ARIA)	Platinum	70,000^{^}
^{^} Shipments figures based on certification alone.

== Volume Nine (2013) ==
20-track compilation CD and 20-track DVD released in October 2013 by ABC Music.

1. Something for Kate – "Sweet Nothing" (Calvin Harris)
2. San Cisco – "Get Lucky" (Daft Punk)
3. Emma Louise – "Tessellate" (Alt-J)
4. Vance Joy – "Rolling in the Deep" (Adele)
5. Hermitude featuring Elana Stone – "Get Free" (Major Lazer)
6. HAIM – "Strong Enough" (Sheryl Crow)
7. Tame Impala – "Prototype "(Outkast)
8. KINGSWOOD – "Wolf" (First Aid Kit)
9. Seth Sentry – "Punch In The Face" (Frenzal Rhomb)
10. Abbe May – "Pony" (Ginuwine)
11. Bonjah – "Royals" (Lorde)
12. Tuka – "I'm Into You" (Chet Faker)
13. The Bamboos – "Lost" (Frank Ocean)
14. Jimblah – "Resolution" (Matt Corby)
15. Ash Grunwald featuring Urthboy, Scott Owen and Andy Strachan from the Living End – "Feel Good Inc." (Gorillaz)
16. Chance Waters – "Little Lion Man" (Mumford and Sons)
17. The Trouble with Templeton – "The District Sleeps Alone Tonight" (The Postal Service)
18. FIDLAR – "Red Right Hand" (Nick Cave and the Bad Seeds)
19. Spit Syndicate – "Latch" (Disclosure)
20. Little Green Cars – "To The Last" (James Blake)

=== Weekly charts ===
Chart (2013)	Peak position
Australian Albums (ARIA)	1

=== Year-end charts ===
Chart (2013)	Position
Australian Albums (ARIA)	40

=== Certifications ===
Region	Certification	Certified units/sales
Australia (ARIA)	Gold	35,000^{^}
^{^} Shipments figures based on certification alone.

== Volume Ten (2014) ==
19-track compilation CD and 25-track DVD released in October 2014 by ABC Music.

1. Chvrches – "Do I Wanna Know?" (Arctic Monkeys)
2. John Butler Trio – "Happy" (Pharrell Williams)
3. Chet Faker – "(Lover) You Don't Treat Me No Good" (Sonia Dada)
4. Alex Turner – "Feels Like We Only Go Backwards" (Tame Impala)
5. Karnivool – "Hey Now" (London Grammar)
6. RÜFÜS – "My Number/Charlotte" (Foals/Booka Shade)
7. First Aid Kit – "Love Interruption" (Jack White)
8. Glass Animals – "Love Lockdown" (Kanye West)
9. REMI – "Since I Left You" (The Avalanches)
10. The Jezabels – "Don't Stop Believin'" (Journey)
11. The Delta Riggs – "Gooey" (Glass Animals)
12. Meg Mac – "Bridges" (Broods)
13. James Vincent McMorrow – "West Coast" (Lana Del Rey)
14. Northeast Party House – "Covered In Chrome" (Violent Soho)
15. Saskwatch – "Let Her Go" (Jagwar Ma)
16. Dan Sultan – "Southern Sun" (Boy and Bear)
17. Ásgeir – "Stolen Dance" (Milky Chance)
18. Illy – "Ausmusic Month Medley" (Silverchair, Hilltop Hoods, Paul Kelly, and Flume)
19. Lorde – "Retrograde" (James Blake)

=== Weekly charts ===
Chart (2014)	Peak position
Australian Albums (ARIA)	1

=== Year-end charts ===
Chart (2014)	Position
Australian Albums (ARIA)	21
Chart (2015)	Position
Australian Albums (ARIA)	66

=== Certifications ===
Region	Certification	Certified units/sales
Australia (ARIA)	Platinum	70,000^{^}
^{^} Shipments figures based on certification alone.

== Volume Eleven (2015) ==
40-track compilation CD released on 2 October 2015 by ABC Music.

Disc 1:

1. Thelma Plum – "Gold" (Chet Faker)
2. The Wombats – "Do You Remember" (Jarryd James)
3. Ball Park Music – "Diane Young" (Vampire Weekend)
4. Foals – "Daffodils" (Mark Ronson)
5. Montaigne – "Chandelier" (Sia)
6. #1 Dads featuring Tom Snowdon – "Two Weeks" (FKA Twigs)
7. Dustin Tebbutt – "Young Folks" (Peter Bjorn and John)
8. Gang of Youths – "All My Friends" (LCD Soundsystem)
9. One Day – "Not Many" (Scribe)
10. Little May – "Great Southern Land" (Icehouse)
11. Dorsal Fins – "Pash" (Kate Ceberano)
12. Kilter featuring Ngaiire – "Ice Cream" (Muscles)
13. I Know Leopard – "Waterfalls" (TLC)
14. The Belligerents – "Praise You" (Fatboy Slim)
15. Client Liaison – "Party/! (The Song Formerly Known As)" (Christine Anu/Regurgitator)
16. The Griswolds – "Riptide" (Vance Joy)
17. Hiatus Kaiyote – "Dare" (Gorillaz)
18. Jarryd James – "Say It Ain't So" (Weezer)
19. Boo Seeka – "Pilgrim" (MØ)
20. Jebediah – "Go" (The Chemical Brothers)

Disc 2:

1. Mark Ronson – "I Sat by the Ocean" (Queens of the Stone Age)
2. SAFIA – "Left Hand Free" (Alt-J)
3. Vance Joy – "Fake Plastic Trees" (Radiohead)
4. Highasakite – "Heavenly Father" (Bon Iver)
5. Peking Duk – "Can't Get You Out of My Head" (Kylie Minogue)
6. Catfish and the Bottlemen – "Read My Mind" (The Killers)
7. Mansionair – "Seasons (Waiting on You)" (Future Islands)
8. Tired Lion – "Saramona Said/1979" (Violent Soho/The Smashing Pumpkins)
9. Sticky Fingers – "Delete" (DMA's)
10. Carmada – "Lean On" (Major Lazer)
11. Asta – "I Wanna Dance with Somebody (Who Loves Me) featuring Allday" (Whitney Houston)
12. Holy Holy – "Love Will Tear Us Apart" (Joy Division)
13. Philly – "Three Little Birds" (Bob Marley and the Wailers)
14. The Grenadiers – "Vitriol" (Bluejuice)
15. Jesse Davidson – "Sober" (Childish Gambino)
16. Lisa Mitchell – "Zombie" (Jamie T)
17. Rudimental – "Ready or Not" (Fugees)
18. Kim Churchill – "Just For You" (Sticky Fingers)
19. Milky Chance – "Shake It Off" (Taylor Swift)
20. Bluejuice – "End of the Road" (Boyz II Men)

=== Weekly charts ===
Chart performance for Like a Version: Volume Eleven
Chart (2015)	Peak position
Australian Albums (ARIA)	1

=== Year-end charts ===
Chart performance for Like a Version: Volume Eleven
Chart (2015)	Position
Australian Albums (ARIA)	24
Chart (2016)	Position
Australian Albums (ARIA)	95

=== Certifications ===
Region	Certification	Certified units/sales
Australia (ARIA)	Gold	35,000^{^}
^{^} Shipments figures based on certification alone.

== Volume Twelve (2016) ==
39-track compilation CD released on 7 October 2016 by ABC Music.

Disc 1:

1. Broods – "One Dance" (Drake)
2. The Rubens – "King Kunta/Hello" (Kendrick Lamar/Adele)
3. Tame Impala – "Confide in Me" (Kylie Minogue)
4. Childish Gambino – "So Into You" (Tamia)
5. E^ST – "Bitter Sweet Symphony" (The Verve)
6. Cub Sport – "Ultralight Beam" (Kanye West)
7. Luca Brasi – "How to Make Gravy" (Paul Kelly)
8. Urthboy – "Roll Up Your Sleeves" (Meg Mac)
9. Sarah Blasko – "Life On Mars" (David Bowie)
10. In Hearts Wake – "Vice Grip" (Parkway Drive)
11. The Temper Trap – "Multi-Love" (Unknown Mortal Orchestra)
12. Vera Blue – "Breathe Life" (Jack Garratt)
13. Tuka – "Big Jet Plane" (Angus and Julia Stone)
14. Modern Baseball – "Dope Calypso" (Violent Soho)
15. Ayla – "Throw Your Arms Around Me" (Hunters and Collectors)
16. The Cat Empire – "Get Some" (Lykke Li)
17. Yeo – "Forces" (Japanese Wallpaper)
18. Ngaiire – "The Less I Know the Better" (Tame Impala)
19. Jake Bugg – "If I Could Change Your Mind" (Haim)
20. Grouplove – "Bullshit" (Dune Rats)

Disc 2:

1. Paces featuring Guy Sebastian – "Keeping Score" (L D R U)
2. Drapht – "Frankie Sinatra" (The Avalanches)
3. MS MR – "Genghis Khan" (Miike Snow)
4. Boy and Bear – "Back to Black" (Amy Winehouse)
5. The Murlocs – "Every 1’s a Winner" (Hot Chocolate)
6. Airling – "U Got It Bad" (Usher)
7. Art vs. Science – "Enter Sandman" (Metallica)
8. Claptone – "How Deep Is Your Love?" (The Rapture)
9. Dylan Joel – "You've Got a Friend in Me" (Randy Newman)
10. Bad Dreems – "Can't Feel My Face" (The Weeknd)
11. Anne –Marie – "Listen to Soul, Listen to Blues" (Safia)
12. Methyl Ethel – "Cry Me A River" (Justin Timberlake)
13. City Calm Down – "Spanish Sahara" (Foals)
14. Alpine – "Cigarettes Will Kill You" (Ben Lee)
15. Robbie Miller – "Say My Name" (Odesza)
16. The Jungle Giants – "Lights and Music" (Cut Copy)
17. Raury – "L$D" (ASAP Rocky)
18. Olympia – "Dreams" (Beck)
19. Art of Sleeping – "Hotline Bling" (Drake)

=== Weekly charts ===
Chart (2016)	Peak position
Australian Albums (ARIA)	1

=== Year-end charts ===
Chart (2016)	Position
Australian Albums (ARIA)	27

=== Certifications ===
Region	Certification	Certified units/sales
Australia (ARIA)	Gold	35,000^{^}
^{^} Shipments figures based on certification alone.

== Volume Thirteen (2017) ==
38-track compilation CD released on 6 October 2017 by ABC Music.

Disc 1:

1. DMA's – "Believe" (Cher)
2. Northeast Party House – "Redbone" (Childish Gambino)
3. Haim – "That Don't Impress Me Much" (Shania Twain)
4. Holy Holy – "Hold Up" (Beyoncé)
5. Flume featuring Vince Staples, Kučka, Vera Blue and Ngaiire – "My Boo" (Ghost Town DJ's)
6. The Jezabels – "If You Go" (Sticky Fingers)
7. Matt Corby – "Chains" (Tina Arena)
8. Slumberjack featuring K.Flay – "Paper Planes" (M.I.A.)
9. Violent Soho – "Lazy Eye" (Silversun Pickups)
10. Glass Animals – "Crazy" (Gnarls Barkley)
11. Vallis Alps – "New Slang" (The Shins)
12. Horrorshow – "No Aphrodisiac" (The Whitlams)
13. Camp Cope – "Maps" (Yeah Yeah Yeahs)
14. Paul Dempsey – "Edge of Town" (Middle Kids)
15. Milky Chance – "I'm Like a Bird" (Nelly Furtado)
16. Maggie Rogers – "Say Something Loving" (The xx)
17. M-Phazes – "Weathered" (Jack Garratt)
18. PUP – "You Don't Get Me High Anymore" (Phantogram)
19. Alex Lahey – "Torn" (Natalie Imbruglia)
20. Julia Jacklin – "Someday" (The Strokes)

Disc 2:

1. A.B. Original featuring Paul Kelly and Dan Sultan – "Dumb Things" (Paul Kelly)
2. Elk Road featuring Lisa Mitchell – "Crave You/The Less I Know the Better" (Flight Facilities/Tame Impala)
3. Amy Shark – "Miss You Love" (Silverchair)
4. Kingswood – "Say My Name" (Destiny’s Child)
5. Ta-ku featuring Wafia – "Leave (Get Out)" (JoJo)
6. Bishop Briggs – "Monday" (Matt Corby)
7. Polish Club – "Never Be like You" (Flume)
8. sleepmakeswaves – "Children" (Robert Miles)
9. Emma Louise – "Into My Arms" (Nick Cave and the Bad Seeds)
10. Margaret Glaspy – "Let Me Love You" (DJ Snake and Justin Bieber)
11. Ásgeir – "Love$ick" (Mura Masa and ASAP Rocky)
12. Birdz – "Djäpana (Sunset Dreaming)" (Yothu Yindi)
13. AURORA – "Teardrop" (Massive Attack)
14. Big Scary – "Come As You Are" (Nirvana)
15. Winston Surfshirt – "21 Questions" (50 Cent)
16. Kasabian – "Insane in the Brain" (Cypress Hill)
17. Middle Kids – "Don't Dream It's Over" (Crowded House)
18. Tash Sultana – "Electric Feel" (MGMT)

=== Weekly charts ===
Chart (2017)	Peak position
Australian Albums (ARIA)	1

== Volume Fourteen (2018) ==
39-track compilation CD released on 19 October 2018 by ABC Music.

Disc 1:

1. Gang of Youths – "Blood" (The Middle East)
2. Chvrches – "LOVE." (Kendrick Lamar)
3. Ball Park Music – "My Happiness" (Powderfinger)
4. Ocean Alley – "Baby Come Back" (Player)
5. Meg Mac – "Let It Happen" (Tame Impala)
6. Phoenix – "No Woman" (Whitney)
7. The Kooks – "Feel It Still" (Portugal. The Man)
8. Joyride – "Since U Been Gone" (Kelly Clarkson)
9. Angus and Julia Stone – "Passionfruit" (Drake)
10. Dean Lewis – "Mended" (Vera Blue)
11. Eves Karydas – "(You Make Me Feel Like) A Natural Woman" (Aretha Franklin)
12. Wolf Alice – "Boys" (Charli XCX)
13. Thundamentals – "Ivy" (Frank Ocean)
14. Lanks – "Numb" (Hayden James)
15. Tia Gostelow – "We Are The People" (Empire of the Sun)
16. B Wise – "Under The Bridge" (Red Hot Chili Peppers)
17. West Thebarton – "You've Got The Love" (Florence and The Machine)
18. Grinspoon – "Get Out" (Chvrches)
19. Alex the Astronaut – "If I Could Start Today Again" (Paul Kelly)

Disc 2:

1. Odette – "Magnolia" (Gang of Youths)
2. Tonight Alive – "Affirmation" (Savage Garden)
3. Loyle Carner – "Gimme The Mic" (George Benson)
4. Crooked Colours – "Suga Suga" (Baby Bash)
5. Press Club – "When You Were Young" (The Killers)
6. Gordi – "In the End" (Linkin Park)
7. Billie Eilish – "Bad" (Michael Jackson)
8. Ziggy Alberts – "Juke Jam" (Chance The Rapper)
9. Slum Sociable – "Somebody To Love Me" (Mark Ronson and The Business Intl.)
10. Sløtface – "Supercut" (Lorde)
11. Tired Lion – "Death To The Lads" (The Smith Street Band)
12. GoldLink – "Frontin'" (Pharrell Williams)
13. The Preatures – "Everything Now" (Arcade Fire)
14. Tove Styrke – "Loving Is Easy" (Rex Orange County)
15. Kuren – "Unforgettable" (French Montana)
16. Cloud Control – "Dreams" (The Cranberries)
17. Nothing But Thieves – "What Can I Do If The Fire Goes Out?" (Gang of Youths)
18. Superorganism – "Congratulations" (MGMT) and "Congratulations" (Post Malone)
19. Woodes – "Lay It On Me" (Vance Joy)
20. George Maple – "We Found Love" (Calvin Harris and Rihanna)

=== Weekly charts ===
Chart (2018)	Peak position
Australian Albums (ARIA)	6

== Volume Fifteen (2019) ==
42-track compilation CD released on 18 October 2019 by ABC Music.

Disc 1:

1. Denzel Curry – "Bulls On Parade" (Rage Against the Machine)
2. Amy Shark – "Be Alright" (Dean Lewis)
3. Adrian Eagle – "Confidence" (Ocean Alley)
4. Holy Holy – "Green Light" (Lorde)
5. Aurora – "Across the Universe" (The Beatles)
6. Ceres – "A Thousand Miles" (Vanessa Carlton)
7. Allday and The Veronicas – "Big Yellow Taxi" (Joni Mitchell)
8. Pond – "Ray Of Light" (Madonna)
9. Glades – "Straight Lines" (Silverchair)
10. Skegss – "Here Comes Your Man" (Pixies)
11. Hilltop Hoods – "Can't Stop/In the Air Tonight" (Red Hot Chili Peppers/Phil Collins)
12. Cosmo's Midnight featuring Asta – "Sing It Back" (Moloko)
13. Lily Allen – "Deep End" (Lykke Li)
14. Kwame – "Alright" (Kendrick Lamar)
15. DZ Deathrays featuring The Gooch Palms – "Love Shack" (The B-52s)
16. Graace – "Complicated" (Avril Lavigne)
17. San Cisco – "4Ever" (Clairo)
18. Fidlar – "xanny" (Billie Eilish)
19. SAFIA – "No One Knows" (Queens Of The Stone Age)
20. Jack River – "Truly Madly Deeply" (Savage Garden)
21. Yungblud featuring Halsey – "I Will Follow You into the Dark" (Death Cab for Cutie)

Disc 2:

1. Thelma Plum – "Young Dumb and Broke" (Khalid)
2. Vance Joy – "Elastic Heart" (Sia)
3. Charli XCX – "Don't Delete the Kisses" (Wolf Alice)
4. Dear Seattle – "The Special Two" (Missy Higgins)
5. Kira Puru – "Last Friday Night (T.G.I.F.)" (Katy Perry)
6. The Presets – "Power and The Passion" (Midnight Oil)
7. Laurel – "Happy Man" (Jungle)
8. Cub Sport – "when the party's over" (Billie Eilish)
9. Brockhampton – "Un-Thinkable (I'm Ready)" (Alicia Keys)
10. Ruby Fields – "The Unguarded Moment" (The Church)
11. Hockey Dad featuring Hatchie – "I Try" (Macy Gray)
12. Thandi Phoenix – "Glory Box" (Portishead)
13. Hein Cooper – "The Fear" (Lily Allen)
14. Clea – "Nothing Breaks Like a Heart" (Mark Ronson and Miley Cyrus)
15. Slowly Slowly – "Skinny Love" (Bon Iver)
16. Broods – "My Old Man" (Mac Demarco)
17. The Herd – "Bodies" (Wafia)
18. Nicole Millar – "Reborn" (Kids See Ghosts)
19. King Princess – "Fell In Love With A Girl" (The White Stripes)
20. Parcels – "I Will Always Love You" (Dolly Parton)
21. The Wombats – "White Christmas" (Bing Crosby)

=== Weekly charts ===
Chart performance for Like a Version: Volume Fifteen
Chart (2019)	Peak position
Australian Albums (ARIA)	6

== Volume Sixteen (2020) ==
40-track compilation CD released on 23 October 2020 by ABC Music / Universal Music Australia.

Disc 1:

1. Alex Lahey – "Welcome to the Black Parade" (My Chemical Romance)
2. Lime Cordiale – "I Touch Myself" (Divinyls)
3. Taka Perry featuring A.Girl, Emalia and Gia Vorne – "Jesus Walks" (Kanye West)
4. Eves Karydas – "Painkiller" (Ruel)
5. Polish Club – "Say So" (Doja Cat)
6. Childish Gambino – "Lost In You" (Chris Gaines)
7. Angie McMahon – "Knowing Me, Knowing You" (ABBA)
8. Hermitude featuring Jaguar Jonze – "Heart –Shaped Box" (Nirvana)
9. Bugs – "Charlie" (Mallrat)
10. Milky Chance – "Dance Monkey" (Tones and I)
11. Benee – "Mile High" (James Blake featuring Travis Scott and Metro Boomin)
12. Gordi – "Wrecking Ball" (Miley Cyrus)
13. Hauskey – "Mr. Brightside" (The Killers)
14. Dominic Fike – "Bags" (Clairo)
15. Stella Donnelly – "Love Is in the Air" (John Paul Young)
16. Kim Churchill – "Don't Know How to Keep Loving You" (Julia Jacklin)
17. Jimblah – "What's Going On" (Marvin Gaye)
18. The Naked and Famous – "Blinding Lights" (the Weeknd)
19. Gengahr – "Everything I Wanted" (Billie Eilish)
20. Northlane – "Get Free" (The Vines)

Disc 2:

1. G Flip featuring Thandi Phoenix, JessB, Jess Kent, Isabella Manfredi, Rosie Fitzgerald, Alex the Astronaut, Clio Renner, Kate Richards, Bernice Tasara and Carla Dobbie – "Lady Marmalade" (Christina Aguilera, Lil' Kim, Mýa and Pink)
2. Fergus James – "Soaked" (Benee)
3. Azure Ryder – "Don't Start Now" (Dua Lipa)
4. Chillinit featuring Lil Dijon – "Sugar" (Brockhampton)
5. Stand Atlantic – "Righteous" (Juice Wrld)
6. Japanese Wallpaper – "California" (Phantom Planet)
7. Leikeli47 – "No Diggity" (Blackstreet featuring Dr. Dre and Queen Pen)
8. Alex the Astronaut – "Mr. Blue Sky" (Electric Light Orchestra)
9. Petit Biscuit – "1901" (Phoenix)
10. Nilufer Yanya – "Super Rich Kids" (Frank Ocean featuring Earl Sweatshirt)
11. The Vanns – "Hey, Ma" (Bon Iver)
12. Wafia – "My My My!" (Troye Sivan)
13. Jarryd James – "When the War Is Over" (Cold Chisel)
14. Maddy Jane – "Unwritten" (Natasha Bedingfield)
15. Mickey Kojak – "Parlez Vous Francais?" (Art vs. Science)
16. Of Monsters and Men – "Circles" (Post Malone)
17. Becca Hatch – "Burn for You" (John Farnham)
18. Bad//Dreems featuring Peter Garrett, Mambali and Emily Wurramara – "Blackfella/Whitefella" (Warumpi Band)
19. Yours Truly – "Don't Look Back In Anger" (Oasis)
20. Tones and I – "Forever Young" (Alphaville)

=== Weekly charts ===
Chart performance for Like a Version: Volume Sixteen
Chart (2020)	Peak position
Australian Albums (ARIA)	32

== Best Australian Like a Version ==
=== Volume 1 (2025) ===
To celebrate the 50th year of Triple J, a compilation album featuring iconic Australian covers was released on LP record.

Side A:

1. DMA's – "Believe" (Cher)
2. G Flip – "Cruel Summer" (Taylor Swift)
3. Royel Otis – "Murder on the Dancefloor" (Sophie Ellis-Bextor)
4. Ruby Fields – "The Unguarded Moment" (The Church)
5. Flume – "Shooting Stars" (Bag Raiders)
6. Lime Cordiale – "I Touch Myself" (Divinyls)
7. Missy Higgins – "One of Your Girls" (Troye Sivan)

Side B:

1. South Summit – "Roxanne" (The Police)
2. The Wiggles – "Elephant" (Tame Impala)
3. Dune Rats – "Am I Ever Gonna See Your Face Again" (The Angels)
4. King Stingray – "Yellow" (Coldplay)
5. San Cisco – "Get Lucky" (Daft Punk)
6. Angie McMahon – "Knowing Me, Knowing You" (ABBA)

=== Volume 2 (2026) ===
Side A:

1. Ocean Alley – "Baby Come Back" (Player)
2. The Veronicas – "12 to 12" (Sombr)
3. Beddy Rays – "Khe Sanh" (Cold Chisel)
4. Playlunch – "It's Raining Men" (The Weather Girls)
5. Spacey Jane – "Here Comes the Sun" (The Beatles)
6. Stand Atlantic – "Righteous" (Juice Wrld)

Side B:

1. Camp Cope – "Seventeen Going Under" (Sam Fender)
2. The Dreggs – "Take On Me" (A-ha)
3. Cub Sport – "When the Party's Over" (Billie Eilish)
4. Genesis Owusu – "Paint It Black" (The Rolling Stones)
5. Jem Cassar-Daley – "The Sweet Escape" (Gwen Stefani)
6. Keli Holiday – "I'm on Fire" (Bruce Springsteen)

=== See also ===
- Triple J Hottest 100 of Like a Version

== See also ==
- Live Lounge, a cover version segment on BBC Radio 1
- Even Better Than the Real Thing, a series of charity albums made up of covers by Ireland's Today FM
