= The Velvet Club =

Australian indie rock band

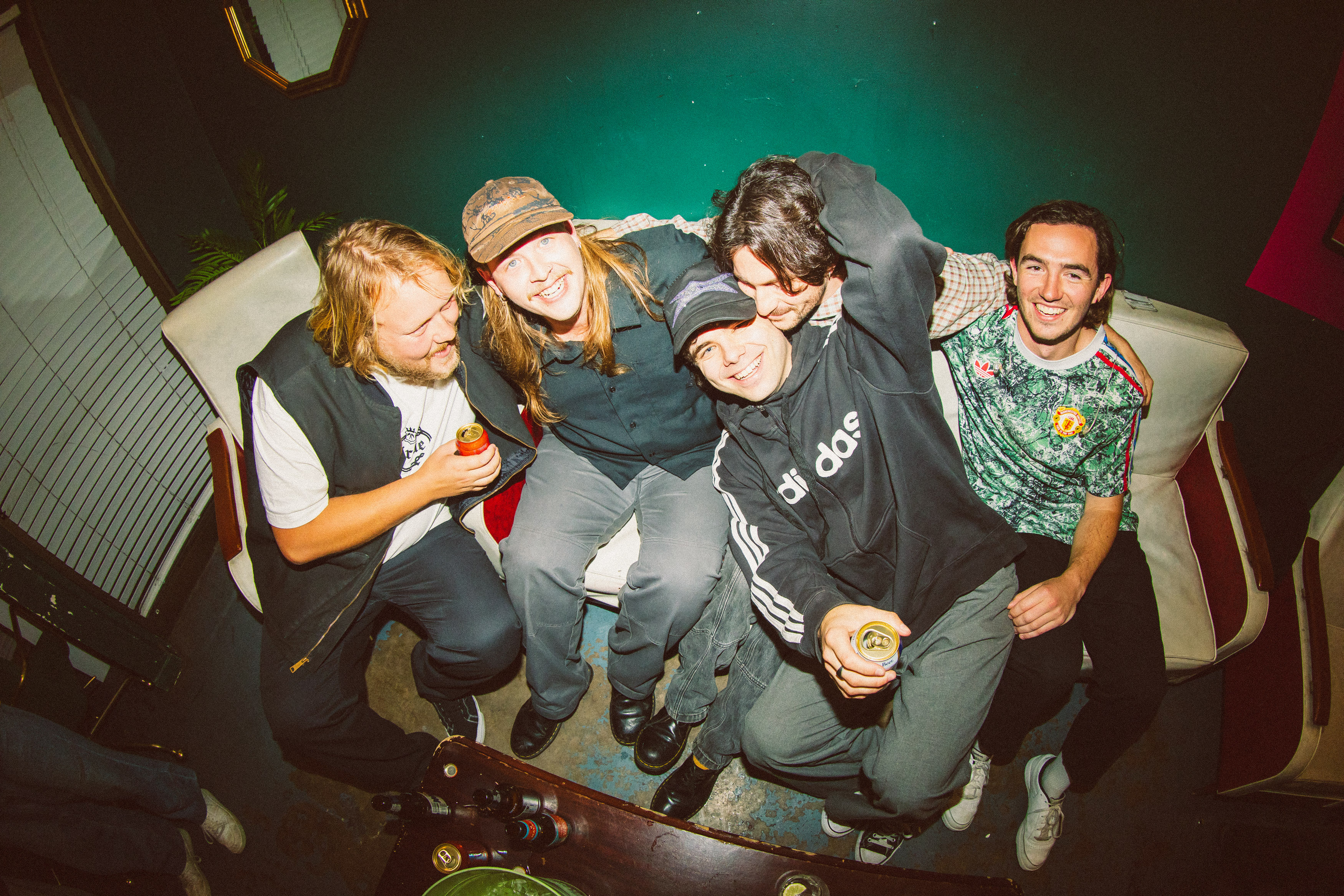
- The Velvet Club backstage in Melbourne.

Background information
- Origin: Melbourne, Victoria, Australia
- Genres: Indie rock, alternative rock
- Years active: 2018–present
- Label: Community Music
- Members: AJ Tilyard; Thomas Otten; Lachlan McDowell; Andrew Dooris; Sam McRae
- Past members: Aiden Inglis; Scott MacDougall

The Velvet Club is an Australian indie rock band formed in Melbourne in 2018. The band consists of lead vocalist and guitarist AJ Tilyard, guitarist Thomas Otten, rhythm guitarist Lachlan McDowell, bass guitarist Andrew Dooris, and drummer Sam McRae.

The band released their debut studio album, Are You Falling In Love?, in July 2026. It debuted at number 29 on the ARIA Charts Albums Chart, number two on the ARIA Australian Albums Chart, and number three on the AIR Independent Label Albums Chart.

== History ==
=== 2018–2023: Formation and early years ===
The Velvet Club was formed in Melbourne, Australia in 2018. Their first Australian tour came in support of the Rions in 2022. Throughout 2022, the group released a sequence of singles including "Love Me The Same" and "Thinking Straight" to form their EP “Lose Track.”

=== 2024–present: Space Between and debut album ===
In 2024, the band released their extended play (EP), Space Between, preceded by the singles "Sleeping In" and "Gets Me Down".

The band toured the EP nationally including a slot on the Triple J stage at Bigsound 2024.

In late 2025, the band released "Anything", the lead single for their upcoming LP. The band followed this with a series of 2026 single releases, including "Blue", "We Don't Talk", and "I Need Something Too". On 10 July 2026, the band officially released their 10-track debut studio album, Are You Falling In Love? through Community Music, exploring themes of mental health, heartbreak, and healing. The album was mixed by Scott Horscroft and mastered by George Georgiadis.

== Band members ==
=== Current members ===
- AJ Tilyard – lead vocals, rhythm guitar, keyboards, percussion
- Thomas Otten – lead guitar
- Lachlan McDowell – rhythm guitar
- Andrew Dooris – bass guitar
- Sam McRae – drums

=== Former members ===
- Aiden Inglis – bass guitar
- Scott MacDougall – bass guitar

== Discography ==
=== Studio albums ===
Title	Album details	Peak chart positions			
Title	Album details	AUS	AUS Aus.	AIR Indie	AIR 100%
Are You Falling In Love?	Released: 10 July 2026; Label: Community Music; Formats: Digital download, streaming, vinyl	29	2	3	2

=== Extended plays ===
Title	EP details
Extended Play	Released: 2019; Format: Digital download, streaming; Label: Independent
Lose Track	Released: 8 February 2023; Format: Digital download, streaming; Label: Independent
Space Between	Released: 2024; Format: Digital download, streaming; Label: Independent
