= UNIFIED Music Group =

Australian music company

- UNIFIED Music Group's logo
- Industry: Music
- Founded: 2011
- Founder: Jaddan Comerford
- Headquarters: Richmond, Melbourne, Australia
- Number of locations: 6 (Melbourne, Sydney, Los Angeles, New York, Nashville, Toronto)
- Area served: Worldwide
- Key people: Jaddan Comerford (CEO, founder)
- Divisions: Recorded Music, Artist Management, Merchandise Services, Touring and Events
- Subsidiaries: Community Music
- Website: https://unifiedmusicgroup.com

Unified Music Group (stylised as UNIFIED) is an independently owned, Australian music company. It was founded in 2011. The company operates in Melbourne, Sydney, Los Angeles, New York, Nashville and Toronto

== Activities ==
UNIFIED Music Group manages the record label UNFD, the merchandise store 24Hundred, and music festivals such as UNIFY—A Heavy Music Festival and The Hills Are Alive. The artist management division represents artists such as Vance Joy, Violent Soho, and The Amity Affliction. As of March 2018, UNIFIED's labels — UNFD, ONETWO, NLV Records, Exist. Recordings, THAA Records, and Domestic La La — are distributed globally through the company's distribution service Community Music.

== Divisions ==
UNIFIED Music Group has four divisions that oversee various artists and music services.

=== Recorded Music ===
UNIFIED Music Group runs a publishing service in collaboration with Mushroom Publishing, formed in 2011.

In 2021, UNIFIED launched Community Music, its music distribution and artist services branch. Community Music releases music from artists including Pete Murray, Ocean Alley, Maddy Jane, LANKS and more.

The distribution service was expanded in 2024 with the announcement of a A$10 million investment by Comerford.

=== Artist Management ===
As of August 2025, UNIFIED Music Group's current roster includes:

- Azure Ryder
- Bella Amor
- Ben Gerrans
- Ben Quad
- Bodyjar
- Bones and Jones
- Crown Lands
- Dan Sultan
- Emma Donovan
- Emma Louise
- Ennaria
- FELIVAND
- Free Throw
- HUNNY
- ISHAN
- Jack River
- Jet
- Microwave
- Ocean Alley
- Polyphia
- Safia
- Scott LePage
- Teen Jesus and the Jean Teasers
- The Amity Affliction
- The Dirty Nil
- The Grogans
- The Rions
- The Stamps
- Tim Henson
- Turnover
- Vance Joy
- Violent Soho
- Wade Forster

=== UNIFIED Grant ===
In 2016, the company launched the UNIFIED Grant consisting of five $5,000 grants. It aims to aid young people who want to work in the music industry but are not musicians, such as photographers, producers, videographers, web developers, graphic designers, journalists, app builders, and data analysts.

=== Merchandise Services ===
UNIFIED Music Group's Merchandise Services division operates merchandise companies both independently and in collaboration with Australian labels and businesses. UNIFIED founded the merchandise store 24Hundred in 2013. The division has collaborated with other companies to create additional merchandise stores, including STL Tones, The Music Vault, and The Vinyl Store.

=== Touring and Events ===
UNIFY - A Heavy Music Gathering launched in 2015. The festival was held in Tarwin Lower, and featured The Amity Affliction and Northlane. The 2018 installment featured Parkway Drive, Architects, and The Amity Affliction.

In 2015, UNIFIED opened its London office.

In 2016, UNIFIED launched UNIFY Presents, a touring company, with Live Nation Australia, . Sample tours includeBring Me the Horizon's 2016/2017 tour, Architects' 2017 tour, A Day To Remember's Bad Vibes Tour, Enter Shikari's Redshift Tour, and Northlane / In Hearts Wake's Equinox Tour.

In 2017, UNIFIED joined Live Nation and Secret Sounds to promote the first Australian instalment of Download Festival. The festival took place in Melbourne in March 2018. The lineup included Korn, Prophets of Rage, Limp Bizkit, Mastodon, NOFX, Good Charlotte and more.

In 2023, UNIFIED announced that UNIFY's future was "not certain".
