= Tara Simmons =

Australian musician (1984–2019)

- Born: 22 March 1984
- Origin: Brisbane, Australia
- Died: 17 January 2019 (aged 34)
- Genres: Folk; Pop; Alternative; Rock; Electronica
- Years active: 2006–2019
- Label: Independent
- Website: Tarasimmons.com

Tara Emily Simmons (22 March 1984 – 17 January 2019) was an Australian musician from Brisbane, Australia. Simmons was proficient in voice, keys and sometimes cello and was known for her use of bedroom, bathroom and kitchen items to sample extra sounds for her recordings.

== History ==
Simmons began to play the piano at the age of three and the cello at the age of eight, dabbling in songwriting along the way. Vocal lessons soon followed and she attended a performing arts school that taught her music technology and performance. She then went on to study at university, in both production and songwriting at the Queensland University of Technology.

== Early career ==
In 2005, Simmons began recording her self-financed, self-produced seven-track debut EP Pendulum but quickly shelved it, thinking it wasn't good enough. She eventually sent a copy to Caroline Tran at Australian radio station Triple J radio who took a liking to its lead single 'Everybody Loves You' and played it a number of times. The song also went on to be a finalist at the Q Song Awards 2006 and selected as a feature song for Triple J OzMusic Month. She eventually realized the EP's potential and it was released in August 2006.

Immediately returning to the studio, this time with her cellist Briony Luttrell, Simmons began recording songs for her four track second EP All The Amendments. By the time it was released in February 2007, Simmons had garnered the attention of the community and national radio and played as support for My Latest Novel and Home Video.

Triple J radio once again played an important part in the promotion of All The Amendments, playing the EP's lead single 'The Recycling Bin Song'.

In October 2007, Tara had the 11 tracks from her two previous EPs remastered and repackaged onto a single disc compilation entitled EPilation, a term Tara herself created to mean "EP compilation."

== Debut album, recognition (2007–2008) ==
Also in October 2007, Tara began work on songs for her debut album with co-producer Briony Luttrell. Recording in the apartment they share, Tara and Briony began work on a track called 'You And Me', which is commonly referred to as "that song with the three cellos" when they perform it live.

In August 2008, a new song from Tara's recent recording sessions called Shake was nominated for a Q Song Award in the Pop Category. On Valentine's Day 2009, Tara once again sold out the Judith Wright Centre for the launch of her debut album Spilt Milk. She performed the album in its entirety plus "Pendulum" from her first EP and a cover of They Might Be Giants' song Dr. Worm.

== All You Can (2009) ==
In November 2009, Tara released a brand new EP by the name of All You Can. It was a production collaboration between herself and producer Yanto Browning and spawned two radio singles 'All You Can' and 'I Cannot Be Saved'.

== It's Not Like We're Trying To Move Mountains, YesYou (2011–2012) ==
Most of 2011 was spent in the studio recording with producer Yanto Browning (The Medics, The Jungle Giants, Kate Miller-Heidke, Art of Sleeping) on some material, originally intended to be released as a collaborative side-project. A new song, presumably from these sessions, emerged on YouTube in August called "Honey" though it's not indicated if this will be from the forthcoming release. The first official single "Be Gone" was played on Australia's national youth broadcaster triple j on 11 August 2011 on Zan Rowe's show and it was soon available on iTunes backed with "Honey". The second single "Where Do You Go" debuted on triple j in April on Home & Hosed and was also added to spot rotation. Her second album title It's Not Like We're Trying To Move Mountains was revealed recently during her support slot for Brooklyn's School of Seven Bells in Brisbane. It was released in Australia on 28 September via Inertia. The album contained the previous two singles "Be Gone" and "Where Do You Go" and a third was lifted upon the album's release called "Weekend of Hearts", a song co-written with Dean McGrath of Hungry Kids of Hungary. She embarked on a co-headline tour with Pluto Jonze called "From The Mountains to the Sea".

She also spent much of 2012 touring as the female vocalist for Brisbane-based production duo YesYou whose debut single "The Half Of It" had experienced some radio success. So far, she has only contributed to one actual recording of the band, a cover of Peter Bjorn and John's song "Young Folks" released on the Ministry of Sound Uncovered Vol 4 compilation.

Her song "Be Gone" featured in episode six, season six of Gossip Girl called 'Where The Vile Things Are'.

== Death ==
Simmons died on 17 January 2019, aged 34, following a lengthy battle with breast cancer.

== Band members ==
Circa 2008 – 2011:

- Tara Simmons: vocals, keys, laptop, cello
- Briony Luttrell: cello
- Emma Hales: cello
- Chris O'Neill: drums
- Justin Bliss: double bass
- Robert Davidson: double bass

Circa 2012:

- Tara Simmons (vocals, keys)
- Chris O'Neill (drums)
- Lucas Arundell (synths, guitars)
- Zac Gould (guitars)

== Discography ==
=== Albums ===
- Spilt Milk (February, 2009)
- It's Not Like We're Trying To Move Mountains (September 2012)
- Show Me Spirit ‘Til The End (2020)

=== EPs ===
- Pendulum (August, 2006)
- All The Amendments (February, 2007)
- All You Can (November 2009)

=== Singles ===
- "Everybody Loves You" (2006)
- "The Recycling Bin Song" (2007)
- "When You Say That I Don't Care About You" (2009)
- "All You Can" (2009)
- "I Cannot Be Saved" (2010)
- "Be Gone" b/w "Honey" (2011)
- "Where Do You Go" (2012)
- "Weekend of Hearts" (2012)
- "Achromatopsia" (2018)
- "North" (2019)

=== Compilations ===
- EPilation (2008)
- Mixed Mountains – remix EP (2013)

=== Soundtrack appearances ===
- All My Friends Are Leaving Brisbane (2007) Track: Everybody Loves You]]
- SLiDE (2011) Track: I Cannot Be Saved

=== Compilation appearances ===
- Songs of Applewood (2007) Track: Go And Stop with Guy Webster
- Ministry of Sound Uncovered Vol 4. Track: Young Folk singing lead vocals for YesYou

== In popular culture ==
- All My Friends Are Leaving Brisbane – "Everybody Loves You"
- Wentworth (TV series) S4E10 – "We're All Scared"
- Gossip Girl S6E06 – "Be Gone"
- Please Like Me S2E02 – "No Sleep Tonight"
