= Scary Movies (The Rions song) =

Single by the Rions

from the album Minivan
- Released: 22 March 2023
- Label: The Rions; Community Music
- Songwriters: Noah Blockley; Oscar Dawson; Charlie Gradon; Harry O'Brien; Harley Wilson
- Producer: Chris Collins

The Rions singles chronology
"Anakin" (2022)	"Scary Movies" (2023)	"Minivan" (2023)

"Scary Movies" is a song by Australian indie rock band the Rions, released on 22 March 2023 as the lead single from the band's debut extended play, Minivan.

In 2025, the song was certified gold by the Australian Recording Industry Association (ARIA) for selling the equivalent of 35,000 units.

== Critical reception ==
Vasili Papathanasopoulos from Milky Milky Milky said "The song explores the flurry of new love and the wholesome emotions that follow, and arrives alongside a German Expressionist-inspired visual."

== Certifications ==
Certifications for "Scary Movies"
Region	Certification	Certified units/sales
Australia (ARIA)	Gold	35,000^{‡}
^{‡} Sales+streaming figures based on certification alone.
