= Happiness in a Place It Shouldn't Be =

EP by the Rions
- Released: 27 September 2024
- Length: 22:11
- Label: Community Music

The Rions chronology
Minivan (2023)	Happiness in a Place It Shouldn't Be (2024)	Everything Every Single Day (2025)

Singles from Happiness in a Place It Shouldn't Be
- 1. "Sweet Cocoon" Released: 19 April 2024; 2. "Physical Medicine" Released: 5 July 2024; 3. "Time Will Try" Released: 28 August 2024

Happiness in a Place It Shouldn't Be is the second extended play by Australian indie rock group the Rions. It was announced in early July 2024 and released on 27 September 2024. The EP peaked at number 35 on the ARIA Charts.

At the AIR Awards of 2025, the EP was nominated for Best Independent Rock Album or EP, whilst Twnty Three were nominated for Independent Publicity Team of the Year for their work on this release.

== Reception ==
Pace Proctor from The AU Review gave it 4 out of 5 saying "While the EP delivers plenty of upbeat, festival-ready tunes, its also introspective, emotionally charged, and showcases The Rions’ evolving range and experimentation. Whether it's the country twang of 'Friend', the anthemic build of 'Time Will Try', or the glossy synths of 'Physical Medicine', The Rions navigate a variety of styles without losing their distinct sound, and it rocks."

== Track listing ==
Happiness in a Place It Shouldn't Be track listing
No.	Title	Writer(s)	Length
1.	"Sweet Cocoon"	Noah Blockley; Asher McLean; Tom Partington; Harley Wilson	2:54
2.	"Passionfruit"	Blockley; McLean; Partington; Wilson; Chris Collins	2:49
3.	"Friend"	Blockley; McLean; Partington; Wilson	4:12
4.	"Time Will Try"	Blockley; McLean; Partington; Wilson	4:18
5.	"Physical Medicine"	Blockley; McLean; Partington; Wilson; Collins	3:55
6.	"The Part"	Blockley; McLean; Partington; Wilson	4:20
Total length:			22:11

== Charts ==
Weekly chart performance for Happiness in a Place It Shouldn't Be
Chart (2024)	Peak position
Australian Albums (ARIA)	35
