= Everything Every Single Day =

Studio album by the Rions
- Released: 3 October 2025
- Genre: Pop rock
- Length: 47:22
- Label: Community Music
- Producer: Chris Collins

The Rions chronology
Happiness in a Place It Shouldn't Be (2024)	Everything Every Single Day (2025)

Singles from Everything Every Single Day
- 1. "Shut You Out" Released: 19 March 2025; 2. "Maybe I'm Just a Freak" Released: 28 May 2025; 3. "Tonight's Entertainment" Released: 25 July 2025; 4. "Cry" Released: 5 September 2025; 5. "Scumbag" Released: 3 October 2025

Singles from Everything Every Single Day (Deluxe)
- 1. "Idol" Released: 6 March 2026; 2. "How to Breathe" Released: 8 May 2026

Everything Every Single Day is the debut studio album by Australian indie rock group the Rions, released on 3 October 2025 via Community Music and peaked at number 5 on the ARIA Albums Chart..

Everything Every Single Day received critical acclaim, was nominated for Australian Album of the Year at the 2025 J Awards.

In March 2026, the group released "Idol"; the lead single from the deluxe version of the album, scheduled for release in May 2026.

The album was nominated for the 2026 NSW Music Prize.

== Background and release ==
Everything Every Single Day was announced on 26 July 2025, alongside a national promotional tour. Upon announcement, the group said: "It's the most open wound we've allowed the world to see so far. Our triumphs, regrets, shortcomings, philosophies, hopes and dreams — all on a silver platter."

The album was supported by an Australian national theatre tour throughout October 2025 before dates in the UK and Europe in November 2025.

== Critical reception ==
Everything Every Single Day received critical acclaim.

John Zebra from AAA Backstage said "the Rions deliver their most emotionally charged and musically ambitious work to date. Blending pristine pop rock with influences ranging from Sam Fender and the Japanese House to the Beatles, the album balances vulnerability with cinematic scope." Emily Wilson of the Note described the album as "a sensitive and all-encompassing project, a representation of four young men doing their best to understand their place in society." Triple J called the album "13 pristine pop-rock tracks."

== Track listing ==
All lyrics are written by Harley Wilson; all music is composed by Noah Blockley, Asher McLean, Tom Partington, and Harley Wilson. "Tonight's Entertainment", "Shut You Out", "Married to the Job", "Lobby Calls", "Cry", and "Adelaide" composed with Christopher Collins.

Everything Every Single Day track listing
No.	Title	Length
1.	"Maybe I'm Just a Freak"	4:12
2.	"Tonight's Entertainment"	3:10
3.	"Welcome to the Conversation"	3:44
4.	"Shut You Out"	3:54
5.	"The Art My Mother Likes"	3:03
6.	"Married to the Job"	3:27
7.	"Oh How Hard It Is to Be 20"	2:49
8.	"Maybe It's Everything"	3:52
9.	"Scumbag"	3:53
10.	"Lobby Calls"	3:40
11.	"Wear Me Thin"	3:22
12.	"Cry"	3:21
13.	"Adelaide"	4:55
Total length:		47:22

Everything Every Single Day Deluxe (Disc 2) track listing
No.	Title	Length
1.	"Idol"	3:30
2.	"Brittle"	3:43
3.	"How to Breathe" (with Matt Corby)	3:40
4.	"Dirt"	3:22
5.	"I Don't Know You"	3:43
6.	"She'll Make a Fool Outta Me"	2:37
7.	"Maybe I'm Just a Freak" (piano version)	4:02

== Personnel ==
Credits adapted from Tidal.

=== The Rions ===
- Noah Blockley – vocals, bass guitar
- Asher McLean – guitar
- Tom Partington – drums
- Harley Wilson – guitar (all tracks), piano (1, 2), keyboards (5, 6, 13)

=== Additional contributors ===
- Chris Collins – production, mixing, engineering
- George Georgiadis – mastering

== Charts ==
Chart performance for Everything Every Single Day
Chart (2025)	Peak position
Australian Albums (ARIA)	5
