= Rhythm & Alps =

Rhythm and Alps
- Dates: 30 December – 31 December
- Locations: Wānaka, New Zealand
- Years active: 2011–present
- Website: www.rhythmandalps.co.nz

Rhythm and Alps (commonly known as R&A) is the South Island sister festival of Rhythm & Vines held in Cardrona Valley near Wānaka, New Zealand. The festival began in 2011 in Terrace Downs (Mount Hutt) and in 2013 relocated to its current venue Cardrona Valley.

== Line-ups ==
=== Episode 1 (2011) ===
Episode 1 took place on the last two days of 2011. It featured Grandmaster Flash, Skream and Benga, Flying Lotus, Foreign Beggars, LTJ Bukem, Netsky, Dub FX, Brookes Brothers, Six60, 1814, Homebrew, Antix, Stinky Jim, A Hori Buzz, Tali Live and Acoustic, The Eastern, Dubwise & MC Silva, Soulware, Soulsystem, Ghost, Cyril Orsen, Fried Chicken SoundSystem, DJ Substance, Soul Trader, Kev Fresh, Nacoa, DJ Tido, Knuckles, Seth Hamilton, Tim Seargent, Toby Nice, Reality Chant, Confucius and Dave Boogie.

=== Episode 2 (2012) ===
Episode 2 took place on the last two days of 2012 and attracted approximately 4000 people. It featured SBTRKT, Disclosure Live, Unknown Mortal Orchestra, Flume, Electric Wire Hustle, Opiuo, Spektrum, The Upbeats, Fiord, High Contrast, Camo & Krooked, Logistics (musician), S. P. Y, MC Wrec, Chali 2na, The Gaslamp Killer, DJ Yoda, A Hori Buzz, The Nudge, Die! Die! Die!, Tripswitch, Ruby Frost, Fiord, Crushington, Shes So Rad, Tali Live, Reality Chant Jah Red Lion & Mc Silva, Thank You City, Pikachunes, Dub Terminator, Tim Richards, Glass Vaults, Alphabethead Departure Lounge, Amiria Grennel, The Shocking And Stunning, Razorwyre, The Transistors, Louis Barkerhey Lady, Kev Fresh, Dj Spell, Deejay Dredford, Og, The Merchants Of Flow, Soulsystem, Dj Tido, Will Styles, Mike T, Chiccoreli, Bone Traders, Seth Hamilton, Soul Trader, St Eden, and Cure Motel.

=== Episode 3 (2013) ===
Episode 3 took place on the last two days of 2013. It featured Rudimental, Shapeshifter, Hospitality Presents: Camo & Krooked, High Contrast, Danny Byrd, Metrik and Dynamite MC, Zane Lowe, The Veils, Dj Zinc, Nathan Haines Feat. Kevin Mark Trail, David Dallas, Cairo Knife Fight, Tahuna Breaks, The Funk Hunters, P-Money, Recloose, @Peace, Truth, Freddie Cruger Aka Red Astaire, Spikey Tee, Concord Dawn, Bulletproof, Louis Baker, Mayavanya, The Nomad, Reality Chant & Mc Silva & Jah Red Lion, Steve Ward, Jamie Stevens, Thankyou City, Estére, Thanks, Ruse, Gasp, Lewis Tennant, Steezie Wonder, Sticky Fingaz, Kev Fresh, Play Djs (R.I.A & C:She), Seth Hamilton and Holly Arrowsworth.

=== Episode 4 (2014) ===
Episode 4 took place on the last two days of 2014. It featured Bastille, Shapeshifter, Zane Lowe, Chet Faker, Just Blaze, London Elektricity & MC Wrec, DC Breaks, MØ, Mr Carmack, Mad Professor, Addison Groove, The Cuban Brothers, State of Mind, Ayah Marar, Meta and the Cornerstones, Little May, Team Dynamite, Dopra, Sorceress, Kamand, Haz Beats, Longwalkshortdock, The Nomad, Kev Fresh, Uone, Timmus, Drax Project, Play DJ's, Deep Fried Dub and Ribera.

=== Episode 5 (2015) ===
Episode 5 took place on the last two days of 2015 and attracted 10,000 people. It featured Carl Cox, Sticky Fingers, Chali 2na and the House of Vibe, Opiuo Band, Ed Rush and Optical, Dub Phizix and Strategy, DJ Marky, Mala, Machinedrum, Ame, Weird Together, Electric Wire Hustle, Ahoribuzz, Reality Chant and Deadly Hunta, Kamandi, Arma Del Amor, Remi, JPS, Stickybuds, Summer Thieves, Amit, Kaiser Souzai, Out of Sorts, Thanks Murry Sweetpants and Kumara Funk DJs.

=== Episode 6 (2016) ===
Episode 6 took place on the last two days of 2016. It featured Akil the MC, Arma del Amor, Baynk, Cut Chemist, Cut Snake, Devilskin, Dub FX, Dusky, Ekali, Gareth Thomas, Heidi, Icicle Live ft SP:MC, Isaac Chambers, Ocean Alley, Opiuo, Pacific Heights, Spikey Tee, Tokimonsta, S. P. Y, Thank You City and Young Tapz.

=== Episode 7 (2017) ===
Episode 7 took place on the last two days of 2017. It featured Fat Freddy’s Drop, Ocean Alley, Little Dragon, and Cigarettes After Sex.

=== Episode 8 (2018) ===
Episode 8 took place on the last two days of 2018. It featured Action Bronson, Bicep, DJ Wilkinson, The Black Seeds, Julia Deans, and Matt Corby.

=== Episode 9 (2019) ===
Episode 9 took place on the last two days of 2019. It featured RL Grime, Shapeshifter, Ladi6, and Wilkinson.

=== Episode 10 (2020) ===
Episode 10 took place on the last two days of 2020. It featured Fat Freddy's Drop, Benee, Quix, Shihad, Six60, and The Phoenix Foundation.

=== Episode 11 (2021) ===
Episode 11 took place on the last two days of 2021. It featured a local line-up due to the ongoing COVID-19, situation, Dimension (DJ set), Friction, Culture Shock, Molly and the Chromatics and Carnivorous Plant Society.

=== Episode 12 (2022) ===
Episode 12 took place on the last two days of 2022. It featured Andy C, Chase and Status, Concord Dawn, Cosmo's Midnight, Sampa the Great, and King Gizzard & the Lizard Wizard.

=== Episode 13 (2023) ===
Episode 13 took place on the last two days of 2023. It featured BENEE, Fat Freddy's Drop, Peking Duk, and Ocean Alley.

Ocean Alley band member Lach Galbraith publicly apologised after he was caught shoplifting at a hunting and fishing store in Queenstown, New Zealand while visiting for the festival.

=== Episode 14 (2024) ===
Episode 14 took place on the last two days of 2024.

=== Episode 15 (2025) ===
Episode 15 is scheduled to take place on the last two days of 2025.
