= Night Light (The Rions song) =

2021 song by the Rions

Single by the Rions
- Released: 9 April 2021
- Recorded: Forbes Street Studios, 2020
- Label: the Rions
- Songwriters: Noah Blockley; Tom Partington; Asher McLean; Harley Wilson
- Producer: Callum Howell

The Rions singles chronology
"Head Still Hurts" (2020)	"Night Light" (2021)	"Disassociation" (2021)

"Night Light" is a song by Australian indie rock band the Rions, released independently on 9 April 2021. The song led to the group winning the Triple J Unearthed High songwriting competition.

Following the win, triple j Unearthed's music director Dave Ruby Howe said "As difficult as it is to turn more than 1,400 entries into just five finalists, it's a desperately hard decision to pick a winner to top the class of 2021. In the end, Sydney's the Rions edged ahead of the competition by presenting an undeniable all-round package that impressed all of us at triple j Unearthed – not to mention the Triple J textline which popped off with every play of their roaring single 'Night Light'."

The song was vote in at number 51 in the Triple J Hottest 100, 2021.

The song featured on the Soundtrack to Our Teenage Zombie Apocalypse.

In 2024, the song was certified gold by the Australian Recording Industry Association (ARIA) for selling the equivalent of 35,000 units.

== Certifications ==
Certifications for "Night Light"
Region	Certification	Certified units/sales
Australia (ARIA)	Gold	35,000^{‡}
^{‡} Sales+streaming figures based on certification alone.
