= Lost Tropics =

Studio album by Ocean Alley
- Released: 13 May 2016
- Studio: Jungle Studios
- Length: 39:37
- Label: Ocean Alley
- Producer: Callum Howell

Ocean Alley chronology
In Purple (2015)	Lost Tropics (2016)	Chiaroscuro (2018)

Singles from Lost Tropics
- 1. "Holiday" Released: 3 February 2016; 2. "Lemonworld" Released: 4 April 2016

Lost Tropics is the debut studio album by Australian rock band Ocean Alley, released on 13 May 2016. Following the album's release, the band completed an 8 week tour of Europe. The album was re-released in June 2021 for Record Store Day, which saw the album debut inside the ARIA top 100, at number 83. It re-entered the chart in 2023, peaking at number 70.

== Reception ==
Brian Winters from The Pier said "Lost Tropics, The band's first full-length rides on the heels of two successful, EPs Yellow Mellow (2013) and In Purple (2015). Lost Tropics is Ocean Alley's effort to combine the raw, upbeat energy of Yellow Mellow with the dark, tantalizing sounds from In Purple."

Rolling Stone Australia said "While the core of Ocean Alley's sun-soaked psych-reggae roots remain, Lost Tropics is a bold statement of confidence. The refined production tames the introduction of more experimental jazz, pop and prog elements... Ocean Alley craft a uniquely unforced balance between their unrestrained rock fusion and a pop directness"

== Track listing ==
Lost Tropics track listing
No.	Title	Length
1.	"Lemonworld"	3:14
2.	"Hold On"	3:19
3.	"Pretty Little Devil"	3:21
4.	"Feel"	3:38
5.	"Holiday"	3:12
6.	"Stripes in My Mind"	3:09
7.	"Sleep on It"	3:02
8.	"Millionaires"	3:23
9.	"Fly on the Wall"	4:03
10.	"Partner in Crime"	6:32
11.	"Jellyfish"	2:44
Total length:		39:37

== Charts ==
Chart performance for Lost Tropics
Chart (2021–2023)	Peak position
Australian Albums (ARIA)	70

== Release history ==
Release history and formats for Lost Tropics
Region	Date	Format	Label	Catalogue	Ref.
Australia	13 May 2016	CD; digital download	Ocean Alley		
Australia	April 2017	Vinyl	Ocean Alley		
Australia	4 June 2021	Aquamarine orange vinyl	Ocean Alley	OALT001	
