= My Mistake (Split Enz song) =

Single by Split Enz

from the album Dizrythmia
- B-side: "Crosswords"
- Released: September 1977
- Recorded: Air Studios, London, 1977
- Genre: Progressive rock
- Length: 3:02
- Label: Mushroom Records
- Songwriter(s): Tim Finn; Eddie Rayner
- Producer(s): Geoff Emerick; Split Enz

Split Enz singles chronology
"Another Great Divide" (1977)	"My Mistake" (1977)	"Bold as Brass" (1977)

"My Mistake" is a 1977 song by New Zealand art rock group Split Enz. It was released in September 1977 as the lead single from their studio album Dizrythmia.

"My Mistake" was the first Split Enz song to achieve a top 20 chart position, peaking at #15 in Australia and #21 in the band's native New Zealand.

== Music video ==
The music video for "My Mistake" has a cabaret style. It begins with most of the group in front of a stage playing the music in a dimly lit amphitheatre. Tim Finn walks onto stage and begins to sing. The stage lights up eventually and all the band members can be seen. Throughout the video, Tim Finn performs 'magic tricks' assisted by editing (such as disappearing and appearing items). As is heard on the album version of the song, Finn then scats along with the trumpet solo performed by band member Robert Gillies. At the end of the video, while playing, Gillies' trumpet disappears, and Eddie Rayner's piano disappears as he's playing it.

== Track listing ==
=== UK 12" vinyl ===
Side A

1. "My Mistake" - 2:56
2. "Crosswords" - 3:21

Side B

1. "The Woman Who Loves You" - 6:46

=== Standard 7" vinyl ===
1. "My Mistake" - 2:40
2. "Crosswords" - 3:21

== Cover versions ==
The Panda Band covered the song in 2006 on Australian youth radio station Triple J's Like a Version segment.

== Personnel ==
All members of the performing personnel feature in the music video for "My Mistake".

- Tim Finn - vocals
- Neil Finn - backing vocals, guitars
- Eddie Rayner - piano
- Noel Crombie - percussion
- Robert Gillies - trumpet
- Malcolm Green - drums
- Nigel Griggs - bass

== Charts ==
Chart (1977)	Peak position
Australia (Kent Music Report)	15
New Zealand (Recorded Music NZ)	21
