= Azure Ryder =

Australian singer/songwriter

- Born: Azure Ryder; April 25, 1996 (age 30)
- Origin: Sydney, Australia
- Genres: Alternative rock; indie rock; pop
- Occupation: Singer
- Instrument: Vocals, Guitar, Piano
- Years active: 2020–present
- Label: Island Records
- Website: https://www.azureryder.com/

Azure Ryder (born 1996) is an Australian musician, singer, songwriter based in Sydney. She spent time in the USA and United Kingdom writing and recording music as well as performing at numerous venues before returning to Sydney. She released her debut EP, Running With The Wolves, on 27 March 2020. Azure Covered Dua Lipa's song "Don't Start Now" for Triple J's Like a Version Ryder's third EP, Ladder to the Moon was released on 29 October 2021

Speaking on the Ladder to the Moon Ryder said "This EP is the journey I took through discovering how to stand strongly in who I am, unapologetic about my voice, my dreams and the depth of how I love. When you choose to surrender to love whether it be for yourself or another, these landscapes that once held limitations become wide, commanding and wild like a woman."

Azure's debut studio album, Even Flowers Can Bruise is scheduled for September 2026.

== Early life ==
Her family is of Lebanese origin. After finishing high school, Ryder went traveling through America and decided to do a music course at Berklee College of Music in Boston.

== Discography ==
=== Albums ===
List of albums, with release date and label shown
Title	EP details
Even Flowers Can Bruise	Scheduled: 25 September 2026; Label: Community Music; Formats: digital download, streaming

=== Extended plays ===
List of EPs, with release date and label shown
Title	EP details
Running With the Wolves	Released: 27 March 2020; Label: Island Records; Formats: digital download, streaming
Crazy with the Light	Released: 20 November 2020; Label: Island Records; Formats: digital download, streaming
Ladder to the Moon	Scheduled: 29 October 2021; Label: Island Records; Formats: digital download, streaming

=== Singles ===
List of singles, with year released and album name shown
Title	Year	Certifications	Album
"Dizzy"	2020		Running With the Wolves
"Wolves"	2020	ARIA: Gold	Running With the Wolves
"Petty Isn't Pretty"	2020		Crazy With the Light
"Stronger"	2020		Crazy With the Light
"Dreams"	2021		Non-album singles
"Don't Start Now" (Triple J Like a Version)	2021		Non-album singles
"Some Kind of Love"	2021		Ladder to the Moon
"Ladder to the Moon"	2021		Ladder to the Moon
"Lover Be Brave"	2021		Ladder to the Moon
"Angel"	2023		Non-album singles
"Honeycomb"	2024		Non-album singles
"Collarbones"	2025		Non-album singles
"North Star"	2026		Even Flowers Can Bruise
"I Don't Need You Anymore"	2026		Even Flowers Can Bruise
