= Four Months =

Four Months is an independent release by Muscles that was available from his website and at his shows.

== Track listing ==
1. "Elisa"
2. "Bush Fire"
3. "Lovers Say Goodnight"
4. "Corner of her Jacket"
5. "Memory Pre"
6. "One Inch Badge Pin"
7. "Close Up Boyband Breakdown"
8. "Explode"
9. "Massage"
10. "Gall"
11. "Qualify"
12. "Warehouse Space"
13. "Come Over and Listen to Records"
14. "Exercise with Caution"
15. "Dragonfly"
16. "Rainbow Skylight"
17. "Caramel Blue"
18. "Mispronouncing Wine"
19. "Earpiece"
20. "Think We're Losing You"
