= Bit by Bats =

Australian rock band

- Also known as: The Hurts
- Origin: Adelaide, South Australia, Australia
- Genre: Indie pop
- Years active: 2003–2007
- Labels: Shiny; Architecture; Guano
- Past members: Owen Eszeki; Peter Gravestock; Ben Macklin

Bit by Bats were an Australian three-piece rock band originally from Adelaide with Owen Eszeki on vocals, electric guitar and theremin; Peter Gravestock on vocals, bass guitar, and electric guitar; and Ben Macklin on drums. The group had formed in July 2003 as The Hurts. Their early influences were the Cure, Joy Division, and Television.

Bit by Bats have toured with the Australian bands including Cut Copy, Youth Group, the Grates, and supported international acts including Bloc Party, Pretty Girls Make Graves, Les Savy Fav, Von Bondies, Peaches, and Wire.

In January 2004, they relocated to Melbourne, where Darren Levin of The Sydney Morning Herald observed, "[they] have tapped into [that city's] fledgling post punk scene, playing shows with like-minded no wavers Snap! Crakk! and Love of Diagrams." Their debut self-titled six-track extended play was released on the Architecture label and reached No. 13 on the Australian Independent Record charts in February 2004. In July - August 2004, the band undertook its first tour of the eastern states, with Youth Group and I [Love] Space, during which they released a limited edition tour EP, Sir! Beat Sir!, although only 100 copies of the release were pressed. In October that year, they recorded their second EP, Let's Go Romeo, at Birdland Studios with Dean Turner, although the EP wasn't released until March 2005. This was followed by a tour with The Grates and their own headline tour, supported by the Pharaohs.

For the Big Day Out tour of 2006 they appeared at the Adelaide, Melbourne, and Sydney venues.

Their debut album, Go Go Go!, was recorded at Birdland Studios with production by Dean Turner of Magic Dirt, Rob Long and Lindsay Gravina of Birdland, and was released in April 2007. The Sydney Morning Herald's George Palathingal described it, "a life-affirming collection of spiky, urgent, danceable new wave." Sabine Brix of Mediasearch attended an album launch in East Brunswick in April, and observed, "[they] didn't disappoint with their show either. Frontman Owen was in fine form belting out tracks, both old and new. It's great to see a band which has been around for a few years still performing with so much fervour and passion."

In March 2007, the band toured internationally with a showcase performances at the Canadian Music Week and in the UK, as well as at the Essential Festival. In October, the band recorded a cover version of "Orinoco Flow" for Triple J's Like a Version, the recording was included on the compilation album, Like a Version Four, which was released in November 2008 and reached No. 34 on the ARIA charts. In December of that year, Bit by Bats announced they would disband, although all members remained on good terms. Eszeki went on to perform with Sailors & Swine, and then the Kits. Macklin has performed with Brillig.

== Members ==
- Owen Eszeki – vocals, electric guitar, theremin
- Peter Gravestock – vocals, bass guitar, electric guitar
- Ben Macklin – drums

== Discography ==
=== Albums ===
- Go Go Go! (31 March 2007) Shiny Records (BATSGOFOR1)

=== Extended plays ===
- Bit by Bats (19 January 2004) Architecture Label (ARC018)
- Sir! Beat Sir (July 2004) (limited release - 100 copies)
- Let's Go Romeo (18 March 2005) Guano Music/Inertia Records (GUA001)
