= Tombstone (Ocean Alley song) =

Single by Ocean Alley

from the album Lonely Diamond
- Released: 11 December 2019
- Length: 4:00
- Label: Ocean Alley
- Songwriters: Nic Blom; Baden Donegal; Lachlan Galbraith; Mitch Galbraith; Angus Goodwin; Tom O'Brien
- Producer: Callum Howell

Ocean Alley singles chronology
"Infinity" (2019)	"Tombstone" (2019)	"Hot Chicken" (2020)

Music video
- "Tombstone" on YouTube

"Tombstone" is a song recorded by Australian rock group Ocean Alley. It was released on 11 December 2019 as the third single from the group's third studio album, Lonely Diamond (2020). The song polled at number 14 in the Triple J Hottest 100, 2020. The single was certified platinum in Australia in 2023.

Upon release vocalist Baden Donegal said the song was written some time ago but had relevance with the 2019–20 Australian bushfire season. "Lyrically, I was trying to touch on the current state of the world in general. It was a really weird coincidence, I think everybody would know someone in Australia that's got a house or had to leave the area they're in because of the fires."

== Reception ==
Al Newstead from Triple J said "The track bubbles with Ocean Alley's winning brew of funk, soul, and classic rock and juxtaposes their rhythmic synergy with a sombre lyrical meditation on 'a place that was once the perfect respite, however is now just a wasteland'."

Joey Legittino from Ones to Watch called it "as electrifying bout of rock revival".

== Charts ==
2019 weekly chart performance for "Tombstone"
Chart (2019–2020)	Peak position
New Zealand Hot Singles Chart (Recorded Music NZ)	7

== Certifications ==
Certifications for "Tombstone"
Region	Certification	Certified units/sales
Australia (ARIA)	Platinum	70,000^{‡}
^{‡} Sales+streaming figures based on certification alone.
