= Holiday (Ocean Alley song) =

Single by Ocean Alley

from the album Lonely Diamond
- Released: 3 February 2016
- Length: 3:12
- Label: Ocean Alley
- Songwriter(s): Nic Blom; Baden Donegal; Lachlan Galbraith; Mitch Galbraith; Angus Goodwin; Tom O'Brien
- Producer(s): Callum Howell

Ocean Alley singles chronology
"Muddy Water" (2015)	"Holiday" (2016)	"Lemonworld" (2016)

Music video
- "Holiday" on YouTube

"Holiday" is a song recorded by Australian rock group Ocean Alley. It was released on 3 February 2016 as the lead single from the group's debut studio album, Lost Tropics. The single was certified platinum in Australia in 2023.

== Reception ==
PileRats said the song"clings strong to the summer vibes."

In a review of Single of the Day, Thomas Flynn from The AU review said "This may just be the most tropical, summery song ever."

== Certifications ==
Certifications for "Holiday"
Region	Certification	Certified units/sales
Australia (ARIA)	Platinum	70,000^{‡}
^{‡} Sales+streaming figures based on certification alone.
