= Lemonworld (Ocean Alley song) =

Single by Ocean Alley

from the album Lonely Diamond
- Released: 4 April 2016
- Length: 3:14
- Label: Ocean Alley
- Songwriter(s): Nic Blom; Baden Donegal; Lachlan Galbraith; Mitch Galbraith; Angus Goodwin; Tom O'Brien
- Producer(s): Callum Howell

Ocean Alley singles chronology
"Holiday" (2016)	"Lemonworld" (2016)	"Overgrown" (2017)

Music video
- "Lemonworld" on YouTube

"Lemonworld" is a song recorded by Australian rock group Ocean Alley. It was released on 4 April 2016 as the second and final single from the group's debut studio album, Lost Tropics.

In speaking with Sam Dawes from Happy Mag in April 2016 Baden Donegal said he wanted to nee a song "Lemonworld" telling Dawes, "I guess I just like the idea of having a name that's completely irrelevant to the song instead of just naming it after a lyric or something, it adds to the intrigue of the final product."

The single was certified platinum in Australia in 2023.

== Certifications ==
Certifications for "Lemonworld"
Region	Certification	Certified units/sales
Australia (ARIA)	Platinum	70,000^{‡}
^{‡} Sales+streaming figures based on certification alone.
