= All the Amendments =

All The Amendments

EP by Tara Simmons
- Released: February 2007
- Genre: Indie pop
- Length: 16:45
- Label: Independent
- Producer: Tara Simmons

Tara Simmons chronology
Pendulum (2006)	All The Amendments (2007)

Professional ratings
Review scores
Source	Rating
Noel Mengal - The Courier Mail	4/5 stars

All The Amendments is the second EP from Brisbane musician Tara Simmons and was released in February 2007.

It features the single "The Recycling Bin Song," which received airplay on Triple J after both announcer Caroline Tran and music director Richard Kingsmill took a liking to it.

== Track listing ==
1. "Trip Over"
2. "Ballet"
3. "The Recycling Bin Song"
4. "Patience"
