= In Purple =

EP by Ocean Alley
- Released: 28 August 2015
- Studios: The Palmgrove Studios, Studios 301
- Length: 28:40
- Label: Ocean Alley
- Producers: Callum Howell, Rohin Brown

Ocean Alley chronology
Yellow Mellow (2013)	In Purple (2015)	Lost Tropics (2015)

Singles from In Purple
- 1. "Space Goat" Released: May 2015; 2. "Muddy Water" Released: August 2015

In Purple is the second extended play by Australian rock band Ocean Alley, released on 28 August 2015. It received a vinyl reissue in 2020 for its fifth anniversary. Following its vinyl reissue in August 2026, the EP peaked at number 50 on the Australian ARIA Charts.

== Reception ==
Professional ratings
Review scores
Source	Rating
The Music	3/5 stars

Paul Barbieri from The Music said "Combining '70s psychedelic soundscapes with blues, reggae and ska probably shouldn't work, but these boys make it seem effortless."

Lauren Katulka from Sounds of Oz said "The songs are full of sexy grooves and infectious hooks" and "[it] is a little rough around the edges, but I think its rawness is endearing. It adds a sense of authenticity that's missing in many more polished recordings. "

== Track listing ==
All tracks are written by Ocean Alley.

In Purple track listing
No.	Title	Length
1.	"Space Goat"	4:22
2.	"Those Daze"	4:00
3.	"Daydreaming"	5:46
4.	"Sleepwalking"	4:27
5.	"Twisted"	5:28
6.	"Muddy Water"	4:41
Total length:		28:40

== Charts ==
Chart performance for In Purple
Chart (2026)	Peak position
Australian Albums (ARIA)	50

== Release history ==
Release history and formats for Yellow Mellow
Region	Date	Format	Label	Catalogue	Ref.
Worldwide	28 August 2015	digital download; CD	Ocean Alley		
Australia	October 2020 (limited to 500)	Vinyl	Ocean Alley		
Australia	14 August 2026	Vinyl (Purple & White Marble)	Ocean Alley	859715322026	
