= Chiaroscuro (Ocean Alley album) =

Studio album by Ocean Alley
- Released: 9 March 2018
- Studio: The Grove Studios
- Length: 48:49
- Labels: Unified, Sony Music Australia

Ocean Alley chronology
Lost Tropics (2016)	Chiaroscuro (2018)	Lonely Diamond (2020)

Singles from Chiaroscuro
- 1. "Overgrown" Released: 2 March 2017; 2. "The Comedown" Released: 11 August 2017; 3. "Confidence" Released: 6 February 2018; 4. "Bones" Released: 6 March 2018; 5. "Knees" Released: 25 May 2018; 6. "Happy Sad" Released: 21 August 2018

Chiaroscuro is the second studio album by the Australian rock band Ocean Alley, released on 9 March 2018. The album entered the Australian ARIA Albums Chart at number 15 following its release. It was supported by a national tour.

At the J Awards of 2018, the album was nominated for Australian Album of the Year.

In December 2018, the album was voted at No. 2 on Triple J's Top 10 Albums of 2018.

In 2018, "The Comedown", was voted into Triple J's Hottest 100 of 2017 at #48, and, in 2019, "Confidence", "Knees" and "Happy Sad" were voted into Triple J's Hottest 100 of 2018 at numbers 1, 10 and 100, respectively. "Bones" was also voted into the Hottest 200 of 2018 at #166.

== Reception ==
Riley Fitzgerald from Music Feeds wrote, "Chiaroscuro is a big, spacious record. 12 tracks arrive crammed full of hooks and loaded with riffs. A radio-friendly rock sound with funk and reggae undercurrents." An ABC staff writer called the album "a sun drenched, genre bending delight". Emma Salisbury from The Music magazine wrote, "As the album's title suggests, this work explores both light and shade. In a confident step forward, Ocean Alley have crafted a seamless blend of the two within their constantly evolving melting pot of psychedelic and surf rock." A staff writer from The Newcastle Herald called the album "a stunning collection of ebbing and flowing tracks; full of slinky bass riffs, epic harmonies and soaring guitar solos".

== Track listing ==
No.	Title	Length
1.	"Corduroy"	3:14
2.	"The Comedown"	4:44
3.	"Happy Sad"	5:30
4.	"Confidence"	4:13
5.	"Knees"	4:45
6.	"Rage"	4:13
7.	"She's Always Right"	4:04
8.	"Frostbite"	3:24
9.	"Overgrown"	3:54
10.	"Bones"	3:19
11.	"Flowers and Booze"	4:03
12.	"Man You Were Looking For"	3:26
Total length:		48:49

== Charts ==
=== Weekly charts ===
Chart (2018–2019)	Peak position
Australian Albums (ARIA)	11
New Zealand Albums (RMNZ)	38

=== Year-end charts ===
Chart (2018)	Position
Australian Artist Albums (ARIA)	25

Chart (2019)	Position
Australian Albums (ARIA)	78

== Certifications ==
Region	Certification	Certified units/sales
Australia (ARIA)	Gold	35,000^{‡}
New Zealand (RMNZ)	2× Platinum	30,000^{‡}
^{‡} Sales+streaming figures based on certification alone.

== Release history ==
Region	Date	Format	Label	Catalogue	Ref.
Australia	9 March 2018	CD; digital download; streaming; 2× vinyl	Unified / Sony Music Australia	OA001	
