= Low Altitude Living =

2022 studio album by Ocean Alley

Studio album by Ocean Alley
- Released: 14 October 2022
- Labels: Ocean Alley, Community Music

Ocean Alley chronology
Lonely Diamond (2020)	Low Altitude Living (2022)	Love Balloon (2025)

Singles from Low Altitude Living
- 1. "Touch Back Down" Released: 16 November 2021; 2. "Deepest Darkness" Released: 24 May 2022; 3. "Home" Released: September 2022; 4. "Double Vision" Released: October 2022

Low Altitude Living is the fourth studio album by Australian band Ocean Alley. It was released on 14 October 2022 by Community Music. The album was announced in September 2022 alongside the release of the album's third single, "Home". Low Altitude Living peaked at number 3 on the ARIA Charts.

At the AIR Awards of 2023, the album was nominated for Best Independent Rock Album or EP.

== Reception ==
Professional ratings
Review scores
Source	Rating
Rolling Stone Australia	3.5/5 stars

James Di Fabrizio from Rolling Stone Australia said "Low Altitude Living was created through different means to Ocean Alley's previous work...The new record is a time capsule of the pandemic, with ideas demoed and finessed digitally first. While this imbues the album with a welcome, broader sonic palette, the band's infectious chemistry doesn't always translate." Di Fabrizio added "Baden Donegal has never sounded better."

== Track listing ==
Low Altitude Living track listing
No.	Title	Length
1.	"Home"	3:30
2.	"Double Vision"	4:53
3.	"Touch Back Down"	4:15
4.	"Perfume"	3:34
5.	"Drinks and Cigars"	4:11
6.	"Simple Pleasures"	3:45
7.	"Parking Fines"	3:49
8.	"Changes"	4:44
9.	"Deepest Darkness"	4:06
10.	"West Coast"	3:29
11.	"Snake Eyes"	3:43
12.	"Lapwing"	6:12

== Charts ==
Weekly chart performance for Low Altitude Living
Chart (2022)	Peak position
Australian Albums (ARIA)	3
New Zealand Albums (RMNZ)	5
