= Muscles (musician) =

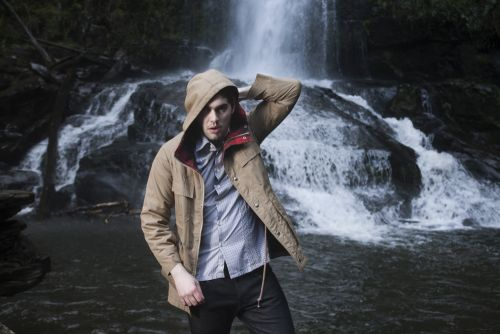
- Muscles in 2010

Background information
- Born: Chris Copulos; 1986/1987
- Origin: Shepparton, Victoria, Australia
- Genre: Electronica
- Occupations: Songwriter, musician, producer, DJ
- Label: Modular

Chris Copulos (born 1986 or 1987), better known by his stage name Muscles, is an Australian electronica musician. Muscles' debut album Guns Babes Lemonade was released in Australia on 29 September 2007. The album entered the Australian ARIA Album Chart at No. 14 on 8 October 2007, reaching No. 3 on the Australian Artist Chart and No. 1 on the Dance Album Chart in its first week.

== History ==
=== Beginnings ===
Muscles self-released Four Months in early 2006, a compilation of 20 lo-fi experimental/dance/ambient songs burned on 80 handmade CD-Rs, whilst playing various open mic nights in Melbourne. Muscles's first single "One Inch Badge Pin" gained small radio play on Australian national youth radio Triple J in July 2006. Playing various indie nights and club shows between Melbourne, Muscles supported Girl Talk in Melbourne and Sydney and performed New Year's Eve at Honkytonks 'The Last Dance' closing down party.

2007 began with a concert at Sydney Festival alongside Midnight Juggernauts, Ajax and Gus Da Hoodrat. A week later Muscles was chosen as the support for Hot Chip's Melbourne Big Day Out sideshow. A special one-off performance was organised in February at Click Click (in Brown Alley), arranging 10 musicians from local indie bands in Melbourne to come together and play four songs in a 10 piece superstar improv-band to a mixed response. February included gigs at St. Kilda Festival, main support for Jenny Wilson's Australian tour, parties in Sydney at Bandits and Bad Kids Recreation Club. Late February Modular threw a launch party for their new compilation 'Leave Them All Behind 2' at Bondi Beach, the night included DJ sets from Van She Tech and Bang Gang DJs and Muscles was asked to play live.

In March he opened the first ever Golden Plains Festival (sister to the popular Meredith Music Festival, Australia's biggest non-commercial festival). Three weeks later was Australia's first ever V Festival, Muscles was not on the line-up but was added last minute a night before due to a band cancelling, already booked to play the official afterparty there were three shows that day including a DJ set at Club 77. Muscles met Soulwax/2manydjs at the V festival afterparty where he was asked to support them on an 11 date North American tour in April for their US release of Nite Versions.

Muscles returned to Australia in May, supporting Architecture in Helsinki on their east coast tour including an all ages show at The Metro in Sydney.

Muscles spent a month in London between May and June playing club nights and parties. The debut album Guns Babes Lemonade (completed in February) was mastered at The Exchange during this time. Highlights of the tour include supporting Robyn in Camden, supporting Soulwax in an underground railway, playing the O2 Wireless Festival afterparty in London and the O2 Wireless Festival in Leeds. Amongst gigs in London, Leeds, Bristol, Brighton and Nottingham, the tour also included a gig in Rome with The Presets (that Motörhead attended after their concert with Iron Maiden that night) and a Modular Party in Paris at Maxim's restaurant.

In August, Muscles played at the Splendour in the Grass festival, a few days later travelling to Japan with Cut Copy, The Presets and The Bang Gang DJs, to play two shows at Womb and Summersonic Festival Modular Midnight Stage.

Mid-August saw the release of "Ice Cream" and "Sweaty", a double A-side Australian CD single on Modular. "Ice Cream" had been a radio-only single since March, due to Triple J and community radio stations around the country picking it up 6 months before Muscles had a record deal.

=== Guns Babes Lemonade ===
He performed on the Parklife national festival tour in September alongside Justice, M.I.A., Digitalism and MSTRKRFT. The debut album Guns Babes Lemonade was released in Australia during this tour. Muscles did a two-week North American club tour in October to promote the US release of the album. In November and December, he played his first headline tour of Australia including 3 Melbourne shows at the Corner Hotel, Adelaide's Rocket Bar, Family in Brisbane, and an all-ages show at The Forum in Sydney. The tour also included festivals in Newcastle, New South Wales and Canberra, a Myspace Secret Show in Coffs Harbour and the biggest Australian-only music festival Homebake. December 2007 saw Muscles on the support bill for the inaugural Nevereverland festival, headlined by Daft Punk. He was again booked for the festival's 2008 edition, but was taken off the bill mid-tour due to rifts with label Modular, taking to MySpace to vent his frustrations. He missed the Meredith Music Festival due to illness. As of 13 December 2007, his album had reached No. 3 on the CMJ RPM (Electronic) charts in the US. New Year's Eve highlights included playing an abandoned cinema complex in Melbourne with Felix Da Housecat, Spank Rock and Chromeo. Muscles also supported Felix Da Housecat in Sydney on New Year's Day after playing BBQ Breaks in Brisbane that afternoon.

In 2008, Muscles was one of the headline acts at the Southbound Festival in Busselton, Western Australia along with Groove Armada, Kings of Leon and others. In February, he was asked to play the Good Vibrations Festival in Sydney and also gained the main live support for the Chemical Brothers' Australian tour. In February announced he would embark on a 17-date Australian tour to promote the single "The Lake", which was released in release late April 2008. An encore show in Melbourne was added due to popularity in his hometown, and a third Perth show also after Perth and Fremantle shows sold out. With 14 shows selling out it proved to be a record breaking tour for an emerging Australian artist. Muscles unorthodox performance at the 2008 Meredith Music Festival included him disappearing behind stage with his wireless microphone and repeatedly yelling "You can't see me!" to a confused audience.

Muscles' singles "Ice Cream" and "Sweaty" appeared in the Triple J Hottest 100, 2007 at Nos. 14 and 76 respectively.

=== Acoustic ===
Muscles' acoustic piano rendition of "Ice Cream" reached No. 45 on the Triple J Hottest 100, 2008, on 26 January 2009, Australia Day.

=== Younger & Immature EP ===
A press release on 7 September 2010 from Modular/Universal Australia announced a five-track EP entitled Younger & Immature and lead single "Girl Crazy Go", released in late October 2010.

=== "Koala"/"I'll Follow You" ===
The double A-side single "Koala" and "I'll Follow You" was released by Modular 1 July 2011. It was released to promote Muscles' second album.

== Discography ==
=== Albums ===
List of albums, with selected details and chart positions
| Title | Details | Peak chart positions |
| Title | Details | AUS |
|---|---|---|
| Guns Babes Lemonade | Released: 29 September 2007; Label: Modular; Format: CD, digital download | 14 |
| Manhood | Released: June 2012; Label: Modular; Format: CD, digital download | — |
| Gods | Released: March 2017; Label: Muscles Music; Format: Digital download, streaming | — |
| Love Synthesizers | Released: April 2017; Label: Muscles Music; Format: Digital download, streaming | — |
| Muscles | Released: January 2020; Label: Muscles Music; Format: Digital download, streaming | — |
| Hydrovox | Released: January 2021; Label: Muscles Music; Format: Digital download, streaming | — |

=== EPs ===
- Four Months (February 2006) (promo)
- Hyperpop! (April 2006) (independent release)
- Popular Music Is (May 2006) (independent release)
- Gold Coast Babes (May 2006) (independent release)
- Younger & Immature EP (October 2010) (Modular)

=== Singles ===
List of singles, with selected chart positions
| Title | Year | Peak chart positions | Album |
| Title | Year | AUS | Album |
|---|---|---|---|
| "One Inch Badge Pin" | 2007 | — | Guns Babes Lemonade |
| "Ice Cream" / "Sweaty" | 2007 | 59 | Guns Babes Lemonade |
| "Sweaty" (international) | 2008 | — | Guns Babes Lemonade |
| "Ice Cream" (UK) | 2008 | — | Guns Babes Lemonade |
| "The Lake" (US) | 2008 | — | Guns Babes Lemonade |
| "Girl Crazy Go" | 2010 | — | Manhood |
| "Princess Beatrice Royal Hat" | 2011 | — | Non-album single |
| "Koala" / "I'll Follow You" | 2011 | — | Manhood |
| "Unicorns" | 2015 | — | Gods |
| "Be Your Man" | 2016 | — | Gods |

=== Remixes ===
Songs that Muscles has remixed include:

- Emma-Louise – "Jungle" (2011)
- Kylie Minogue – "Put Your Hands Up" (2011)
- Sly Hats – "Vampire Sips" (2009)
- Robyn – "Cobrastyle" (2008)

Unreleased remixes:

- Ben Lee – "I Love Pop Music" (2009)
- Architecture in Helsinki – "Nevereverdid" (2008)
- Children Collide – "Frozen Armies" (2006)

=== Music videos ===
- "Sweaty" [Chris Hopkins] (2007)
- "The Lake" [Jaron Albertin] (2008)
- "Girl Crazy Go" [Beaufort] (2010)
