= Guns Babes Lemonade =

Studio album by Muscles
- Released: 29 September 2007
- Recorded: Melbourne
- Genre: Electronica
- Length: 43:53
- Producer: Muscles

Muscles chronology
Guns Babes Lemonade (2007)	Manhood (2012)

Professional ratings
Review scores
Source	Rating
AllMusic	4.5/5 stars
BBC Music	
Drowned in Sound	7/10
MusicOMH	3.5/5 stars
NME	7/10
Pitchfork	8.3/10
Rolling Stone	3.5/5 stars
Time Out	5/6 stars
Triple J	4/5
XLR8R	9/10

Guns Babes Lemonade is the debut album by Australian electronica musician Muscles. It was released in Australia on 29 September 2007, 23 October 2007 in the US, and 28 April 2008 in the UK and Europe.

== Track listing ==
1. "Sweaty" – 4:16
2. "Chocolate Raspberry Lemon & Lime" – 2:04
3. "Ice Cream" – 3:28
4. "Jerk" – 3:09
5. "One Inch Badge Pin" – 4:15
6. "My Friend Richard" – 3:51
7. "The Lake" – 4:03
8. "Lauren from Glebe" – 3:39
9. "Marshmallow" – 4:26
10. "Futurekidz" – 7:04
11. "Hey Muscles I Love You" – 3:43

== Charts ==
Chart (2007)	Peak position
Australian Albums (ARIA)	14
