= The Rions =

Australian indie rock band

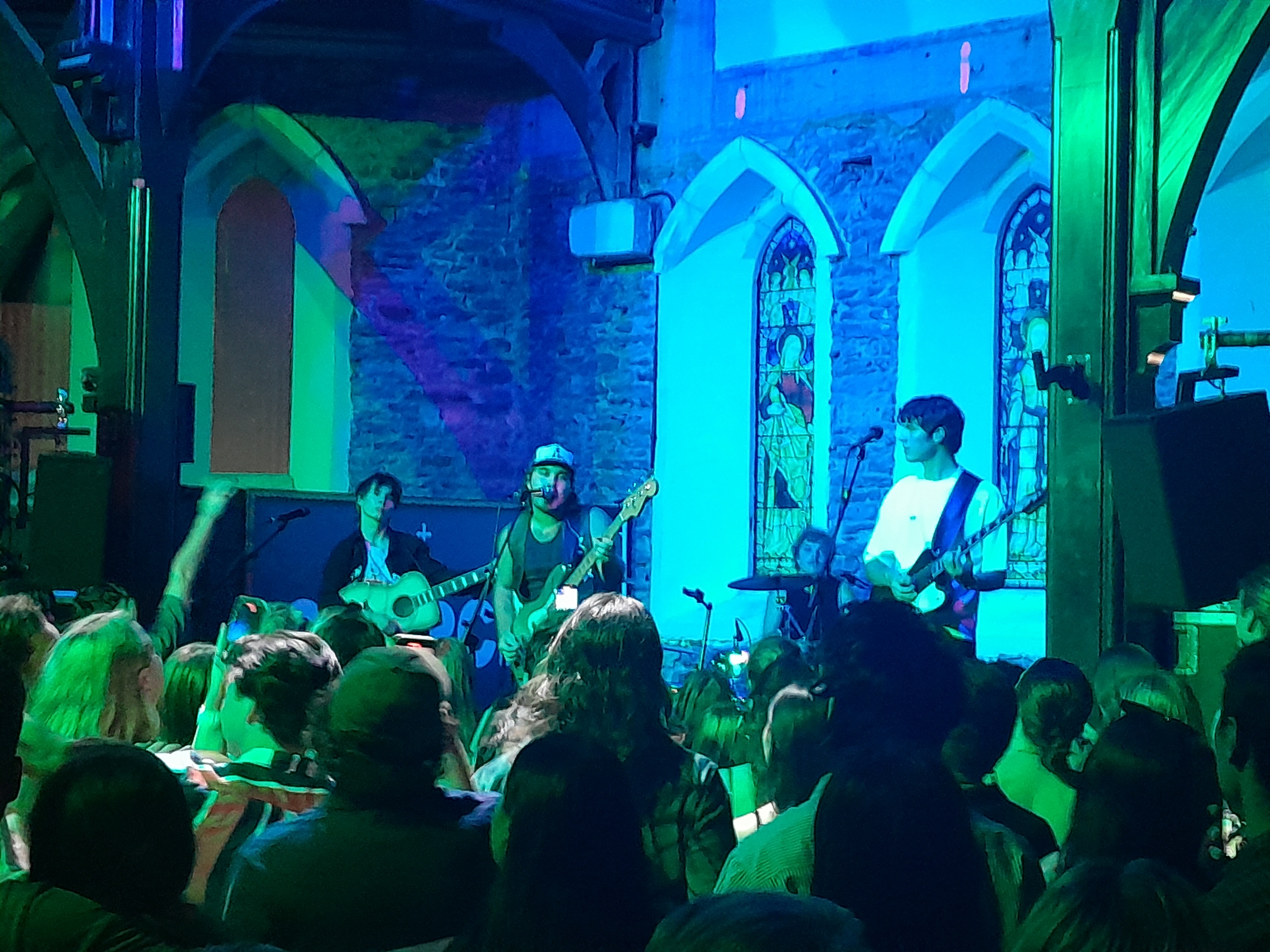
- The Rions performing in Christchurch, New Zealand in 2025

Background information
- Origin: Northern Beaches, Sydney, New South Wales
- Genres: Indie rock; pop
- Years active: 2016–present
- Label: Community Music (UNIFIED Music Group)
- Members: Noah Blockley; Harley Wilson; Asher McLean; Tom Partington
- Website: therions.com

The Rions are an Australian indie rock band from the Northern Beaches, New South Wales. The band consists of Noah Blockley (lead vocals, bass guitar), Harley Wilson (guitar), Asher McLean (guitar), and Tom Partington (drums). In 2021, they were announced as the winners of Australian national youth broadcaster Triple J's Unearthed High competition for their song "Night Light". Musically, they are an indie rock and pop band, and cite fellow Northern Beaches bands Lime Cordiale and Ocean Alley as influences.

== Career ==
=== 2016-2024: Career beginnings and early EPs ===
The Rions formed in 2016, consisting of lead vocalist and bass guitarist, Noah Blockley, guitarists Harley Wilson and Asher McLean, and drummer Tom Partington. They met at a year 7 talent quest.

In 2020 they released the singles "Halfway Out", "Sadie" and Head Still Hurts" whilst in year 11.

On 9 April 2021, they released the single "Night Light". On 19 August, the Rions were announced as the winner's Australian youth broadcaster Triple J's Unearthed High competition for their song "Night Light". Included as part of their prize was a mentoring session with duo Lime Cordiale and a support slot on fellow Unearthed High winner George Alice's next national tour. On 1 December 2021, they released the single "Disassociation". Alongside the announcement, the band revealed that they had signed with UNIFIED Music Group.

In July 2024, The Rions released "Physical Medicine" and announced their second EP. Happiness in a Place It Shouldn't Be, which was released on 27 September 2024. The EP received significant attention, reaching number 35 on the ARIA charts. The tracks "Physical Medicine" and "Passionfruit" were also voted onto Triple J's Hottest 100 of 2024, placing at 46 and 61 respectively.

=== 2025: Everything Every Single Day ===
On 19 March 2025, the band released their first single for their upcoming project, "Shut You Out". They shared a second single, "Maybe I'm Just a Freak", on 28 May 2025. On 22 July 2025, the band released the third single "Tonight's Entertainment", along with announcing their debut album Everything Every Single Day, as well as a national headline tour. The album is set to release on 3 October 2025, the day their headlining tour begins.

In December 2025, the band is joining the Spilt Milk festival line-up alongside fellow Australian indie-rock bands The Dreggs and Rum Jungle, as well as international headliners Kendrick Lamar and Doechii.

== Musical style and influences ==
The Rions have been described as indie rock and pop. They have been likened to the Vanns, in addition to fellow Northern Beaches acts Lime Cordiale and Ocean Alley. They list Ani DiFranco, Arctic Monkeys, Aretha Franklin, Bryan Adams, Leon Bridges, Ray Charles, Stevie Wonder, and the Beatles as musical influences.

== Band members ==
- Noah Blockley – lead vocals, bass guitar
- Harley Wilson – guitar
- Asher McLean – guitar
- Tom Partington – drums

== Discography ==
=== Studio albums ===
List of studio albums, with selected details and peak chart positions
Title	Details	Peak chart positions
Title	Details	AUS
Everything Every Single Day	Released: 3 October 2025; Format: CD, digital download, LP; Label: Community Music	5

=== Extended plays ===
List of EPs, with selected details and peak chart positions
Title	Details	Peak chart positions
Title	Details	AUS
Minivan	Released: 11 August 2023; Format: digital; Label: Community Music	—
Happiness in a Place It Shouldn't Be	Released: 27 September 2024; Format: LP, digital; Label: Community Music	35

=== Singles ===
List of singles, with year released and album name shown
Title	Year	Peak chart positions	Certifications	Album
Title	Year	NZ Hot	Certifications	Album
"Halfway Out"	2020	—		Non-album singles
"Sadie"	2020	—		Non-album singles
"Head Still Hurts"	2020	—		Non-album singles
"Night Light"	2021	—	ARIA: Gold	Non-album singles
"Disassociation"	2021	—		Non-album singles
"Anakin"	2022	—		Non-album singles
"Scary Movies"	2023	—	ARIA: Gold	Minivan
"Minivan"	2023	—		Minivan
"Sweet Cocoon"	2024	—		Happiness in a Place It Shouldn't Be
"Physical Medicine"	2024	—		Happiness in a Place It Shouldn't Be
"Time Will Try"	2024	—		Happiness in a Place It Shouldn't Be
"Shut You Out"	2025	—		Everything Every Single Day
"Maybe I'm Just a Freak"	2025	—		Everything Every Single Day
"Tonight's Entertainment"	2025	—		Everything Every Single Day
"Cry"	2025	—		Everything Every Single Day
"Scumbag"	2025	40		Everything Every Single Day
"Ain't it Fun" (triple j Like A Version)	2025	—		Non-album singles
"Idol"	2026	—		Everything Every Single Day (Deluxe)
"How to Breathe" (with Matt Corby)	2026	40		Everything Every Single Day (Deluxe)

== Awards and nominations ==
=== AIR Awards ===
The Australian Independent Record Awards (commonly known informally as AIR Awards) is an annual awards night to recognise, promote and celebrate the success of Australia's Independent Music sector.

Year	Nominee / work	Award	Result	Ref.
2025	Happiness in a Place It Shouldn't Be	Best Independent Rock Album or EP	Nominated	
2025	Twnty Three PR for Happiness in a Place It Shouldn't Be	Independent Publicity Team of the Year	Nominated	

=== J Awards ===
The J Awards are an annual series of Australian music awards that were established by the Australian Broadcasting Corporation's youth-focused radio station Triple J. They commenced in 2005.

Year	Nominee / work	Award	Result	Ref.
2021	Themselves for "Night Light"	Unearthed High Competition	Won	
2025	Everything Every Single Day	Australian Album of the Year	Nominated	

=== NSW Music Prize ===
The NSW Music Prize aims to "celebrate, support and incentivise" the NSW's most talented artists, with "the aim of inspiring the next generations of stars". It commenced in 2025.

Year	Nominee / work	Award	Result	Ref.
2026	Everything Every Single Day	NSW Music Prize	Nominated	

=== Rolling Stone Australia Awards ===
The Rolling Stone Australia Awards are awarded annually by the Australian edition of Rolling Stone magazine for outstanding contributions to popular culture in the previous year.

Year	Nominee / work	Award	Result	Ref.
2024	The Rions	Best New Artist	Nominated	
2025	The Rions	Rolling Stone Readers Award	Shortlisted	
