= Love Balloon =

2025 studio album by Ocean Alley

Studio album by Ocean Alley
- Released: 19 September 2025
- Genre: Indie rock; surf rock
- Length: 41:25
- Producer: Nick DiDia

Ocean Alley chronology
Low Altitude Living (2022)	Love Balloon (2025)

Singles from Love Balloon
- 1. "Tangerine" Released: 11 October 2024; 2. "Left of the Dealer" Released: 14 February 2025; 3. "Love Balloon" Released: 6 June 2025; 4. "Drenched" Released: 19 September 2025; 5. "First Blush" Released: 9 January 2026

Love Balloon is the fifth studio album by Australian band Ocean Alley. The album was announced in June 2025 alongside its title track, and released on 19 September 2025.

At the AIR Awards of 2026, The Annex was nominated for Independent Marketing Team of the Year, Cult Logic for Independent Publicity Team of the Year, Nick DiDia for Independent Producer of the Year and Leon Zervos for Independent Mix, Studio or Mastering Engineer of the Year for their work on this album.

== Background and recording ==
In October 2024, Ocean Alley released a new single, "Tangerine", the first new music since their 2022 album Low Altitude Living. According to lead singer Baden Donegal, the track was inspired by a drive across the Nullarbor, and the "desert and sunsets on that commute, the sky turning orange, or tangerine."

With the album not yet being announced, the band returned with another track from the album in February 2025, "Left of the Dealer", which the band described as an ode to Creedence Clearwater Revival and Canned Heat.

On 4 June 2025, the band announced Love Balloon as their fifth studio album, on the same day releasing the album's lead single and namesake track.

Recorded with Nick DiDia, whose productions credits include albums from Pearl Jam, Rage Against the Machine and Powderfinger, Love Balloon hears the band explore new musical territory. Lyrically, the album dives into themes of love, and according to keyboardist and vocalist Lach Galbraith: "Not just the cinematic kind where you're falling head over heels, the full spectrum; joy, hurt, discomfort and disappointment. Let's call it the river of love – whether it's with a partner, a friend, or family, you'll never know when it'll get deep, go shallow, or suddenly change course."

== Reception ==
Lars Brandle of Billboard called the album "a dreamy, chilled journey" which he said "should hit the target with the Australian band’s growing fanbase." He continued by saying "Ocean Alley’s throwback sound is like an antidote to the rush of modern life."

UK-based music blog Oculate attributed 4 of a possible 5 stars to their review of the record, stating: "ideal for long drives, festival fields, or those quiet, late-night writing-in-your-journal moments, Love Balloon may not reinvent the wheel, but it’s a reflective journey that’s impossible not to get swept up in."

In an 8/10 review from Mystic Sons, music writer Chris Bound says Love Balloon's palette is "broad yet cohesive," continuing on to say that the band's "decision to work with Nick DiDia has resulted in a stripped-back, organic sound that allows each member’s personality to shine. Lach Galbraith’s keys shimmer with delicate grace, the guitars converse fluidly, and the rhythm section propels the songs with effortless precision."

Bound finished his review summarising that Love Balloon is "a record that celebrates connection, growth, and the simple, profound power of honest music, delivering an album that is as immediate as it is enduring."

== Track listing ==
All lyrics are written by Baden Donegal; all music is composed by Nic Blom, Baden Donegal, Mitchell Galbraith, Lachlan Galbraith, Angus Goodwin, and Tom O'Brien.

Love Balloon track listing
No.	Title	Length
1.	"First Blush"	5:10
2.	"Tangerine"	4:50
3.	"Ain't No Use"	3:09
4.	"Sweet Boy"	3:52
5.	"Love Balloon"	4:01
6.	"Thru Everything"	4:40
7.	"Left of the Dealer"	4:14
8.	"Down the Line"	3:15
9.	"Life in Love"	4:02
10.	"Drenched"	4:12
Total length:		41:25

== Personnel ==
Credits adapted from Tidal and Bandcamp.

=== Ocean Alley ===
- Nic Blom – bass guitar, recording
- Baden Donegal – vocals, recording (all tracks); guitars (tracks 1, 3–10)
- Lach Galbraith – keyboards, piano, background vocals, recording
- Mitch Galbraith – rhythm guitar, recording
- Angus Goodwin – guitars, recording
- Tom O'Brien – drums, recording

=== Additional contributors ===
- Nick DiDia – production, engineering, mixing
- Leon Zervos – mastering
- Declan Kelly – percussion
- Ashleigh Mannix – background vocals (3)
- Bek Jensen – background vocals (4)
- Juanita Tippens – background vocals (4)
- Xanthe Longley-Bain – background vocals (4)
- Nick Curl – album artwork
- Tyler Bell – album content, creative direction
- Kane Lehanneur – album press shots
- Michael Askew – album animation

== Charts ==
=== Weekly charts ===
Chart performance for Love Balloon
Chart (2025)	Peak position
Australian Albums (ARIA)	3
New Zealand Albums (RMNZ)	13
UK Independent Albums (OCC)	42

=== Year-end charts ===
Year-end chart performance for Love Balloon
Chart (2025)	Position
Australian Artist Albums (ARIA)	15
