= Lonely Diamond =

2020 studio album by Ocean Alley

Studio album by Ocean Alley
- Released: 19 June 2020
- Recorded: 2019–2020
- Studio: The Grove Studios (Sydney)
- Length: 45:36
- Labels: Unified; Sony Music Australia

Ocean Alley chronology
Chiaroscuro (2018)	Lonely Diamond (2020)	Low Altitude Living (2022)

Singles from Lonely Diamond
- 1. "Stained Glass" Released: 21 February 2019; 2. "Infinity" Released: 6 June 2019; 3. "Tombstone" Released: 11 December 2019; 4. "Hot Chicken" Released: 27 April 2020; 5. "Way Down" Released: 19 June 2020

Lonely Diamond is the third studio album by Australian band Ocean Alley. It was released on 19 June 2020 under Unified and Sony Music Australia. The album was announced in April 2020, alongside the release of the album's fourth single, "Hot Chicken".

The album was Triple J's "Feature Album" in the week leading up to its release.

Two singles from the album, "Infinity" and "Stained Glass", featured in Triple J's Hottest 100 of 2019, at number 24 and number 54, respectively.

== Background ==
Following their success in the Triple J Hottest 100 of 2018, in which their song "Confidence" topped the poll and they had four overall songs in the countdown, the band returned to the studio to begin recording their third studio album. The album was announced in April 2020, alongside the release of the album's fourth single, "Hot Chicken".

== Release and promotion ==
On 22 April 2020, Ocean Alley began posting short video clips on Instagram of roast chicken heating in a microwave and of a rotating drumstick, teasing the release of "Hot Chicken", the fourth single from the album. The posts included links to the band's official website, which displayed the album's artwork, a sign-up link to pre-save the single, and a timer, which counted down to 12:00 pm AEST on 27 April. When the website's timer ended, text announcing the premiere of "Hot Chicken" later that night on Triple J and the album artwork were shown.

The band additionally set up a Facebook event simply titled "Hot Chicken"; the event began at the same time and date as when the timer on their website ended.

In the week leading up to the album's release, it was the "Feature Album" on Triple J.

=== Singles ===
The album was preceded by four singles: "Stained Glass", released on 21 February 2019, "Infinity", released on 6 June 2019, "Tombstone", released on 11 December 2019, and "Hot Chicken", released on 27 April 2020. All four singles were premiered on Triple J prior to their official release. A fifth single, "Way Down", was released alongside the album on 19 June.

== Reception ==
Professional ratings
Review scores
Source	Rating
Rolling Stone Australia	4/5 stars

In a positive review of the album, Tyler Jenke of Rolling Stone Australia said: "Ocean Alley have not only managed to exceed expectations with their latest record, but they've managed to set a new standard for what their music can be." He continued: "...the blissful inclusion of songs such as the album's title track serve as a masterclass of restraint, with the group experimenting with a mixture of old and new styles, all while ensuring the tune doesn't overstay its welcome." He also named "All Worn Out" as an album highlight, describing it as "serving as something of a fierce ballad".

Declan Byrne of Triple J said of the album: "You can hear Ocean Alley pushing themselves beyond the coastal, warbled reggae rock of earlier releases and ramping up the '70s influences." Byrne described the tracks 'Up In There' and 'Wet Dreams' as "atmospheric slow jams". Byrne also described the track "Way Down" as a "standout", saying "[it] shows off their signature style but with the underwater feel replaced by warmer sounds, the colour scheme shifted from blues to yellows".

== Tour ==
In February, Ocean Alley announced a tour in support of the album. The tour was originally scheduled to begin in May 2020, but was postponed in March due to the COVID-19 pandemic.

In a statement regarding the postponing of the tour, the band said:

"[The] reschedule is due to the COVID-19 situation that has developed at home and aboard [sic], and is in line with the restrictions and recommendations put in place by the Australian Government with a view to keeping people safe."

The tour re-commenced in February 2021., featuring Psychedelic Porn Crumpets and Dulcie as support acts, and wrapped up in March 2021.

== Track listing ==
Lonely Diamond track listing
No.	Title	Length
1.	"Dahlia"	1:57
2.	"Tombstone"	4:00
3.	"Way Down"	3:20
4.	"Infinity"	3:53
5.	"Up in There"	4:22
6.	"All Worn Out"	3:56
7.	"Stained Glass"	3:47
8.	"Lonely Diamond"	4:50
9.	"Wet Dreams"	4:16
10.	"Hot Chicken"	3:16
11.	"Puesta de Sol"	4:24
12.	"Luna"	3:35
Total length:		45:36

== Charts ==
=== Weekly charts ===
Chart performance for Lonely Diamond
Chart (2020)	Peak position
Australian Albums (ARIA)	3
New Zealand Albums (RMNZ)	6

=== Year-end charts ===
Chart (2020)	Position
Australian Artist Albums (ARIA)	35
Chart (2021)	Position
Australian Artist Albums (ARIA)	47
