= Art of Sleeping =

Australian rock band

- Origin: Brisbane, Queensland, Australia
- Genres: Rock
- Years active: 2012–present
- Labels: Dew Process

Art of Sleeping are an Australian rock band.

== History ==
In 2012, the band released the singles "Empty Hands" and "Above the Water".

In September 2012, the band signed with Dew Process and released their debut EP Like a Thief on 12 October 2012. The EP peaked at number 95 on the ARIA charts.

The band released "Crazy" on 8 December 2014. followed by "Voodoo" in May 2015.

The group recorded "around 50" songs for their debut album. In November 2015, Jarryd Shuker said "The five of us got together one night, we drank beer and we ate good food, and we refined that list. We argued and laughed, and we got to a point where we were all mutually happy." The finished product was Shake Shiver which was released in July 2015.

== Members ==
- Caleb Hodges – vocals & guitars
- Jarryd Shuker - keyboards
- Francois Malengret - bass
- Jean-Paul Malengret - drums
- Patrick Silver - guitars

== Discography ==
=== Studio albums ===
List of studio albums, with Australian chart positions
| Title | Album details | Peak chart positions |
| Title | Album details | AUS |
|---|---|---|
| Shake Shiver | Released: 17 July 2015; Label: Dew Process (DEW9000732); Formats: CD, LP, digital | 27 |

=== Extended Plays ===
List of EPs, with Australian chart positions
| Title | EP details | Peak chart positions |
| Title | EP details | AUS |
|---|---|---|
| Like a Thief | Released: 12 October 2012; Label: Dew Process (DEW9000516); Formats: CD, digital | 95 |

=== Singles ===
List of singles, showing year released and album name
| Title | Year | Peak chart positions | Album |
| Title | Year | AUS | Album |
|---|---|---|---|
| "Empty Hands" | 2012 | — | Like a Thief |
| "Above the Water" | 2012 | — | Like a Thief |
| "Crazy" | 2014 | — | Shake Shiver |
| "Voodoo" | 2015 | — | Shake Shiver |
| "Bleeding Out" | 2015 | — | Shake Shiver |

=== Other charted and certified songs ===
List of other charted songs, with selected chart positions and certifications
| Title | Year | Chart positions | Certifications | Album |
| Title | Year | AUS | Certifications | Album |
|---|---|---|---|---|
| "If Only You Could Ease My Mind" | 2015 | — | ARIA: Gold | Shake Shiver |
