= Yellow Mellow =

EP by Ocean Alley
- Released: 8 September 2013
- Recorded: 2013
- Studios: The Brain Studios, Sydney
- Length: 19:30
- Label: Ocean Alley

Ocean Alley chronology
Yellow Mellow (2013)	In Purple (2015)

Yellow Mellow is the debut extended play by Australian rock band Ocean Alley, released on 8 September 2013. Following its vinyl reissue in January 2024, the EP peaked at number 42 on the Australian ARIA Charts.

== Reception ==
In 2024, The Partae said "A collection of hazy and funky sounds, Yellow Mellow is stamped with early hallmarks of Ocean Alley's now distinct sound – infused with psychedelic instrumentation, dub and plenty of groove, not to mention the essence of DIY and the garage they rehearsed in."

== Track listing ==
All tracks are written by Ocean Alley.

Yellow Mellow track listing
No.	Title	Length
1.	"Paradise a Burn"	2:29
2.	"Freedom Lover"	3:32
3.	"Hallucination"	3:14
4.	"Yellow Mellow"	3:45
5.	"Weary Eyed"	3:27
6.	"Glitter"	3:00
Total length:		19:30

Yellow Mellow (10 Year Anniversary bonus tracks - recorded live in 2023) track listing
No.	Title	Length
1.	"Paradise a Burn"	2:29
2.	"Freedom Lover"	3:38
3.	"Hallucination"	3:21
4.	"Yellow Mellow"	4:09
5.	"Weary Eyed"	3:22
6.	"Glitter"	3:01
Total length:		20:04

== Charts ==
Chart performance for Yellow Mellow
Chart (2024)	Peak position
Australian Albums (ARIA)	41

== Release history ==
Release history and formats for Yellow Mellow
Region	Date	Format	Label	Catalogue	Ref.
Worldwide	8 September 2013	digital download; CD	Ocean Alley		
Australia	April 2017	Vinyl	Ocean Alley		
Australia	December 2020	Vinyl (limited to 500)	Ocean Alley		
Australia	January 2024	Vinyl (10 year anniversary)	Ocean Alley	859711235696	
