= Community Music (company) =

- Industry: Music
- Genre: Online distribution
- Founded: 2021
- Headquarters: Richmond, Melbourne, Australia
- Area served: Worldwide
- Key people: Jaddan Comerford (CEO/founder); Francesca Caldara (vice president); Dan Nascimento (general manager)
- Parent: UNIFIED Music Group
- Website: http://communitymusic.net/

Community Music is an Australian music distribution and artist services business, owned by UNIFIED Music Group and first launched in 2021. Its headquarters are located in Melbourne, Australia, with additional teams located in Sydney, New York and Los Angeles.

Among the artists distributed by Community Music are Ocean Alley, Teen Jesus and the Jean Teasers, Pete Murray, The Rions and others.

== History ==
In October 2021, Community Music was launched as a music distribution and artist services alternative, offering "an option for artists who operate independently or with an independent team to enhance the resources they have in their corner, in turn elevating their release plan," according to General Manager Dan Nascimento.

Between 2021 and the service's relaunch in October 2024, Community Music offered its distribution service primarily to artists within UNIFIED's management roster and for its own record labels Domestic La La and UNFD, as well as a small selection of artists from Australia and in other territories.

Backed by an investment by CEO Jaddan Comerford of $10 million, the platform was re-launched in October 2024 as a "perfect intersection of music, tech and finance and how we’re going to really help bring these really important functions together to ultimately support music."
