= Confidence (Ocean Alley song) =

Single by Ocean Alley

from the album Chiaroscuro
- Released: 6 February 2018
- Length: 4:13
- Label: Ocean Alley
- Songwriters: Baden Donegal; Angus Goodwin; Nic Blom; Lach Galbraith; Mitch Galbraith; Tom O'Brien

Ocean Alley singles chronology
"The Comedown" (2017)	"Confidence" (2018)	"Knees" (2018)

Music video
- "Confidence" on YouTube

"Confidence" is a song recorded by Australian rock group Ocean Alley. It was released on 6 February 2018 as the third single from the group's second studio album, Chiaroscuro (2018). The single was certified platinum in Australia in 2019.

Upon release of the album, Ocean Alley rhythm guitarist Mitch Galbraith said of "Confidence": "We knew we were on to something when we were writing that one, it was different to a lot of our stuff we’d done up to that point. It felt cool for us."

The song was voted number 1 in the Triple J Hottest 100, 2018.

At the ARIA Music Awards of 2019, the song was nominated for Song of the Year. It was also nominated for Rock of the Year at the APRA Music Awards of 2019.

The song gained a resurgence in popularity in December 2023 after becoming popular on TikTok, re-entering the ARIA Singles Chart as well as debuting on American and British charts for the first time. It debuted at #37 on the TikTok Billboard Top 50 on the chart dated 30 December 2023. In 2025, the song ranked 65 on the Triple J Hottest 100 of Australian Songs.

== Reception ==
Esther Triffitt of Amnplify wrote: "'Confidence' oozes an addictive groove, driven by a dragging wah-wah pedal, accompanied by a video packed with the nerves of first-time rollerskating, and the dreaded falls." She added: "With catchy lyrics and a recognisable chorus, 'Confidence' is likely to become a crowd favourite".

Emma Salisbury from The Music said "'Confidence' presents a whomping bass line that intertwines the track's tight marriage of hoarse electric guitar and straight drums, through a laid-back, funky groove. Vocals drenched in harmony echo through a gradual build of synths into perfectly placed hypnotic motifs creating an elaborate, electric soundscape."

== Music video ==
The song's music video was directed and produced by Tyler Bell and released on 5 February 2018.

== Charts ==
=== Weekly charts ===
2019 weekly chart performance for "Confidence"
Chart (2019)	Peak position
Australia (ARIA)	9

2023–2024 weekly chart performance for "Confidence"
Chart (2023–2024)	Peak position
Australia (ARIA)	16
Ireland (IRMA)	29
New Zealand (Recorded Music NZ)	3
UK Indie (Official Charts)	6
US Hot Rock & Alternative Songs (Billboard)	26

=== Year-end charts ===
2019 year-end chart performance for "Confidence"
Chart (2019)	Position
Australia (ARIA)	64

2024 year-end chart performance for "Confidence"
Chart (2024)	Position
US Hot Rock & Alternative Songs (Billboard)	93

== Certifications ==
Certifications for "Confidence"
Region	Certification	Certified units/sales
Australia (ARIA)	6× Platinum	420,000^{‡}
Canada (Music Canada)	Platinum	80,000^{‡}
New Zealand (RMNZ)	6× Platinum	180,000^{‡}
United Kingdom (BPI)	Silver	200,000^{‡}
^{‡} Sales+streaming figures based on certification alone.

== Release history ==
Release history for "Confidence"
Region	Date	Format	Label
Australia	6 February 2018	Digital download; streaming	Ocean Alley
