= Ocean Alley =

Australian rock band

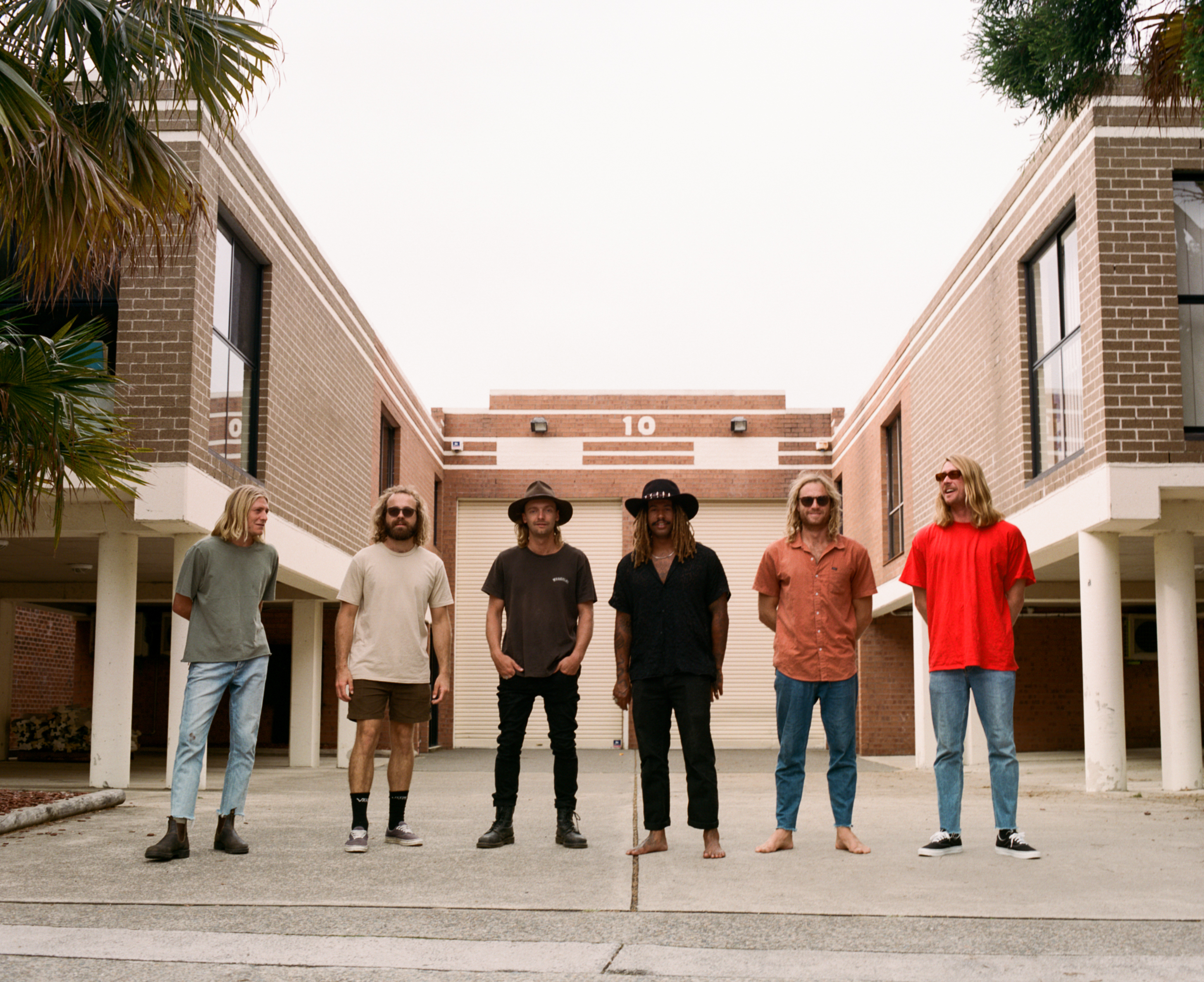
- Ocean Alley in 2020

Background information
- Origin: Northern Beaches, Sydney, New South Wales, Australia
- Genres: Alternative rock, psychedelic rock
- Years active: 2011–present
- Label: Independent
- Members: Baden Donegal; Angus Goodwin; Nic Blom; Lach Galbraith; Mitch Galbraith; Tom O'Brien
- Website: https://oceanalley.com.au/

Ocean Alley is an Australian alternative psychedelic rock band from the Northern Beaches. The band is made up of Baden Donegal (vocals, guitar), Angus Goodwin (lead guitar), Lach Galbraith (keyboard, vocals), Mitch Galbraith (guitar), Nic Blom (bass) and Tom O'Brien (drums). Their style of music has been described as "cruisey psych, rock and reggae fusion".

The band has released five studio albums and two EPs independently. Their second album Chiaroscuro debuted at No. 15 on the ARIA Albums Chart. Their 2017 track "The Comedown" was voted in at No. 48 in the Triple J Hottest 100, 2017.

In 2019, Ocean Alley had four songs in the Triple J Hottest 100, 2018: "Happy Sad" at number 100, "Baby Come Back (Like a Version)" at number 16, "Knees" at number 10, and "Confidence" at number 1.

Their 2024 song "Tangerine" placed at number 15 in the 2024 triple j Hottest 100.

== History ==
=== 2011: Formation ===
The band began playing in a backyard shed in 2011. The members were influenced by the music of Jimi Hendrix, Oasis (band), The Smiths, Pink Floyd, and Dire Straits, and began performing at venues across the Northern Beaches and the city of Sydney, before releasing their debut EP: Yellow Mellow in September 2013.

=== 2012–2013: Yellow Mellow EP ===
The band continued to build a following throughout Sydney upon releasing the EP Yellow Mellow, performing at more venues across the city, and began to gather a wider audience online thanks to their title track of the EP, as well as their first music video for the song "Weary Eyed". They first toured interstate in 2014.

=== 2014–2015: In Purple EP ===
The band went on to tour around Australia five times in their own four-wheel drive (4WD) throughout 2014 and into 2015, gradually building on the size of their shows with each gig. They rounded out their tour dates by releasing their second EP In Purple in August 2015. The EP included the singles "Space Goat" and "Muddy Water".

=== 2015–2016: Lost Tropics and international touring ===
At the end of 2015, Ocean Alley began recording their debut studio album Lost Tropics. Various tracks were still being completed up until the day they started recording. The band later stated that this style of creation was productive, as they did not second guess what they were recording. They toured over the 2015/16 summer with The Ruminaters in Australia, and then to New Zealand for the first time in March.

Using video footage they captured on the road over summer, they released a music video for lead single "Holiday" and followed up with "Lemonworld", before announcing (and selling out) their East Coast Australian tour dates in support of the independent release of the album Lost Tropics on 16 May 2016.

June 2016 marked the beginning of the first major international run of shows for Ocean Alley in support of their debut album. The band would play 40 shows across Europe, including Sold Out shows in the Netherlands and Germany. They also played numerous shows throughout the UK, France, Italy and Switzerland. They would go on to play shows in New Caledonia, before rounding out the Lost Tropics cycle with a tour of Australia and New Zealand, that included appearances at Lost Paradise, Rhythm & Vines, Rhythm & Alps and Soundsplash festival over New Year's Eve.

=== 2017–2018: Chiaroscuro ===
Ocean Alley officially began work on their second album Chiaroscuro in January 2017. The first single from the album, "Overgrown", was released in March 2017. The band spent the first half of 2017 touring, supporting Australian acts such as Tash Sultana, The Cat Empire and Xavier Rudd across Australia, as well as playing festivals such as The Hills Are Alive and Groovin' The Moo locally in Maitland. They would then announce their largest Australian tour to date to take place in August and September; they sold-out shows across Australia and New Zealand, including two nights at The Metro Theatre in Sydney.

In August 2017, Ocean Alley released "The Comedown" as the second single from Chiaroscuro. The single was premiered by Linda Marigliano on triple j Good Nights on 8 August. The song would go on to be the band's biggest release to date, charting at number 48 on the Triple J Hottest 100 in January 2018.

on 4 February 2018, Ocean Alley premiered their single "Confidence" with Richard Kingsmill on triple j. The track was officially released on 6 February 2018, alongside the announcement of their studio album Chiaroscuro. Chiaroscuro was released on 9 March and charted at No. 15 on the ARIA Charts. In support of the release, the band announced headline shows in Australia and North America, as well as being announced to play the Groovin' the Moo festival nationally and Splendour in the Grass 2018. "Confidence" topped the Triple J Hottest 100, 2018.

=== 2019–2020: Lonely Diamond ===
On 22 February 2019, Ocean Alley released "Stained Glass", the first single from the band's forthcoming third studio album. The band said "'Stained Glass' is the first song we have written since the release of Chiaroscuro and began, as most of our songs do, with a chord and vocal idea for a verse that Baden envisioned. "We recorded and mixed the track at the Grove Studios over two sessions with a focus on guitar tone and interwoven guitar parts - as has always been a staple in our production." On 28 April 2020, Ocean Alley premiered their new single "Hot Chicken" on Triple J and announced their third studio album Lonely Diamond, released on 19 June 2020. The album peaked at number 3 on the ARIA Chart.

=== 2021–2022: Low Altitude Living ===
On 17 November 2021, Ocean Alley released "Touch Back Down", the first track from the band's forthcoming fourth studio album, Low Altitude Living, which the band describes as being "more fun and a bit more playful". The album title was announced on 14 September 2022 along with the release of the third single, "Home". Low Altitude Living was released on 14 October 2022.

On 1 January 2024, band member Lach Galbraith publicly apologised after he was caught shoplifting at a hunting and fishing store in Queenstown, New Zealand. The band was in New Zealand at the time to perform at the Rhythm & Alps music festival.

=== 2023: Resurgence of "Confidence" ===
In November 2023, Ocean Alley’s 2018 track "Confidence" experienced a resurgence on TikTok, reaching millions of new fans worldwide. The song became a popular soundtrack for the Behind Every Girl trend, as well as glow-ups and other content celebrating confidence and happiness. The track returned to the top 40 on the ARIA Singles Chart in late November. The song entered the U.K's Independent Single Breakers Chart, at number 19.

=== 2024–present: Love Balloon ===
On 9 October 2024, Ocean Alley released "Tangerine", the lead single from their fifth studio album. This marked their first new music in two years following the release of their fourth studio album, Low Altitude Living. The track gained significant recognition, placing #15 in the 2024 triple j Hottest 100.

Ocean Alley embarked on an extensive world tour, performing across Australia, North America, Europe, the United Kingdom, and New Zealand. The tour featured multiple sold-out shows, including performances at O2 Victoria Warehouse in Manchester and Roundhouse in London.

On 2 December 2024, they announced their biggest headline show to date, a one-night performance at Alexandra Palace in London.

On 10 February 2025, Ocean Alley announced their 2025 North America Tour with the band embarking on their biggest North American run, covering the US and Canada in July and October.

On 11 February 2025, the band released "Left of the Dealer".

On 5 March 2025, Ocean Alley announced their collaboration with Coopers Brewery for a limited-edition pale ale. Described as "a sessionable tropical pale ale that will set you and your best mates up for sunny afternoons that roll into balmy nights". The beverage is available for limited time at bottle shops and pubs across Australia.

In April 2025, the band headlined the final edition of Bluesfest Byron Bay.

On 4 June 2025, Ocean Alley announced their fifth studio album, Love Balloon. Keyboardist and vocalist Lachlan Galbraith described the album as an exploration of the multifaceted nature of love, stating: "Not just the cinematic kind where you're falling head over heels. The full spectrum; joy, hurt, discomfort and disappointment." On the back of the album announcement, the band announced their 2026 Tour for Australia and New Zealand, marking their first headline tour in the market since 2023.

In October 2025, Ocean Alley embarked on their Love Balloon US tour as well as their debut Latin America Tour across 10 headline dates.

The start of 2026 marked the largest headline tour for Ocean Alley, selling over 80,000 tickets across their Love Balloon Australia & New Zealand Tour. The album also reclaimed the #1 position on the AUS Album ARIA chart.

== Impact ==
According to Conor Lochrie of Beats Per Minute, Ocean Alley are "beloved in their home nation" and "have been on a steady incline to the summit of Australian music" since their formation in 2011. He additionally credits their success to their "upbeat and hazy style [being] embraced by both the festival crowd and the commercial mainstream." Ocean Alley have been cited as an influence by various Australian bands, including Archie, South Summit, and the Rions.

== Discography ==
- Lost Tropics (2016)
- Chiaroscuro (2018)
- Lonely Diamond (2020)
- Low Altitude Living (2022)
- Love Balloon (2025)

== Awards and nominations ==
=== AIR Awards ===
The Australian Independent Record Awards (commonly known informally as AIR Awards) is an annual awards night to recognise, promote and celebrate the success of Australia's Independent Music sector.

Year	Nominee / work	Award	Result	Ref.
2023	Low Altitude Living	Best Independent Rock Album or EP	Nominated	
2025	"Tangerine"	Independent Song of the Year	Nominated	
2025	Nick Didia for "Tangerine"	Independent Producer of the Year	Nominated	
2026	The Annex for Love Balloon	Independent Marketing Team of the Year	Nominated	
2026	Cut Logic for Love Balloon	Independent Publicity Team of the Year	Nominated	
2026	Nick Didia for Love Balloon	Independent Producer of the Year	Nominated	
2026	Leon Zervos for Love Balloon	Independent Mix, Studio or Mastering Engineer of the Year	Nominated	

=== ARIA Music Awards ===
The ARIA Music Awards is an annual award ceremony event celebrating the Australian music industry.

Year	Nominee / work	Award	Result	Ref.
2019	"Confidence"	Song of the Year	Nominated	
2020	Lonely Diamond	Best Rock Album	Nominated	
2026	"Love Balloon"	Song of the Year	Nominated	

=== APRA Awards ===
The APRA Awards are held in Australia and New Zealand by the Australasian Performing Right Association to recognise songwriting skills, sales and airplay performance by its members annually.

Year	Nominee / work	Award	Result	Ref.
2019	"Confidence"	Rock Work of the Year	Nominated	
2023	"Touch Back Down"	Most Performed Alternative Work of the Year	Nominated	
2026	"Tangerine"	Song of the Year	Shortlisted	
2026	"Tangerine"	Most Performed Rock Work	Nominated	

=== Environmental Music Prize ===
The Environmental Music Prize is a quest to find a theme song to inspire action on climate and conservation. It commenced in 2022.

Year	Nominee / work	Award	Result	Ref.
2025	"Tangerine"	Environmental Music Prize	Nominated	

=== J Awards ===
The J Awards are an annual series of Australian music awards that were established by the Australian Broadcasting Corporation's youth-focused radio station Triple J. They commenced in 2005.

Year	Nominee / work	Award	Result	Ref.
2018	Chiaroscuro	Australian Album of the Year	Nominated	

=== Rolling Stone Australia Awards ===
The Rolling Stone Australia Awards are awarded annually in January or February by the Australian edition of Rolling Stone magazine for outstanding contributions to popular culture in the previous year.

Year	Nominee / work	Award	Result	Ref.
2021	"Way Down"	Best Single	Nominated	
2025	Ocean Alley	Rolling Stone Global Award	Shortlisted	
