= Triple J's Hottest 100 of Australian Songs =

2025 music poll

Australian Songs Triple J Hottest 100

Countdown details
- Date of countdown: 26 July 2025
- Votes cast: 2,655,826

Countdown highlights
- Winning song: INXS "Never Tear Us Apart"
- Most entries: Bernard Fanning (4 tracks) (Note: Three with Powderfinger (6, 14, 70), one solo (57))

Chronology
← Previous; 2024	Next → 2025

The Hottest 100 of Australian Songs was counted down by Australian youth radio station Triple J on 26 July 2025. Celebrating the broadcaster's 50th anniversary, it was the first time the Hottest 100 polled exclusively Australian songs, with music from all prior years eligible. More than 2.65 million votes were submitted by listeners. The Hottest 200 was counted down from 28 July through to 1 August 2025.

== Background ==
The Hottest 100 is an annual music poll hosted by national youth radio station Triple J. The countdown has been held since 1989, and compiles the top songs of each year as voted by listeners. Several one-off special countdowns have been announced through the years, including the Hottest 100 of the Past 20 Years (2013) and of the 2010s (2020). The 2024 Hottest 100 saw American singer Chappell Roan's "Good Luck, Babe!" voted number one, meanwhile the countdown featured the lowest number of Australian musicians in almost 30 years.

The Hottest 100 of Australian Songs was announced on 17 June 2025 as part of Triple J's 50th anniversary celebrations. For a song to be eligible, it must have been released prior to 19 January 2025, and 50 percent of a song's artists must be Australian. Covers recorded for Like a Version were not eligible.

== Projections ==
The day before the countdown, Triple J revealed that one act in the top 20 would be making their Hottest 100 debut. Further, only 30 votes separated the songs ranked numbers 100 and 101. A total of 2,655,826 votes were submitted. Critics were favouring "My Happiness" (2000) by Powderfinger (placed at No. 6), "Back In Black" (1980) by AC/DC (placed at No. 37), "Am I Ever Gonna See Your Face Again" (1976) by the Angels (placed at No. 12), and "Khe Sanh" (1978) by Cold Chisel (placed at No. 8) to take out the top spot.

== Full list ==
Bold: Previous Hottest 100 winners

Full list with placing, title, artist(s), year released, and original position shown
#	Song	Artist	Year	Annual Hottest 100 position	Previous special occasion Hottest 100 position/s (Note: Initially, songs from any year were eligible for Hottest 100 voting. From 1993, only songs from the previous year were eligible. Hence, some songs released before 1993 placed in some all-time countdowns.)
1	Never Tear Us Apart	INXS	1987		
2	The Nosebleed Section	Hilltop Hoods	2003	9	17 (2009), 4 (2013)
3	Untouched	The Veronicas	2007		
4	Scar	Missy Higgins	2004	2	
5	Don't Dream It's Over	Crowded House	1986		76 (1998), 50 (2009)
**6**	**My Happiness**	**Powderfinger**	**2000**	**1**	**27 (2009), 10 (2013)**
7	Flame Trees	Cold Chisel	1984		
8	Khe Sanh	Cold Chisel	1978		95 (1989), 94 (1998)
9	How to Make Gravy	Paul Kelly	1996		
**10**	**Somebody That I Used to Know**	**Gotye featuring Kimbra**	**2011**	**1**	**9 (2013), 2 (2020)**
11	Sweet Disposition	The Temper Trap	2008		38 (2013)
12	Am I Ever Gonna See Your Face Again	The Angels	1976		
13	Thunderstruck	AC/DC	1990		63 (2009)
**14**	**These Days**	**Powderfinger**	**1999**	**1**	**21 (2009), 8 (2013)**
15	You're the Voice	John Farnham	1986		
16	Innerbloom	Rüfüs Du Sol	2015		5 (2020)
17	Tomorrow	Silverchair	1994	5	59 (1998), 33 (2009), 17 (2013)
18	Beds Are Burning	Midnight Oil	1987		97 (2009)
**19**	**The Less I Know the Better**	**Tame Impala**	**2015**	**4**	**1 (2020)**
**20**	**Big Jet Plane**	**Angus & Julia Stone**	**2010**	**1**	**81 (2013), 9 (2020)**
21	Down Under	Men at Work	1981		
22	To Her Door	Paul Kelly & the Coloured Girls	1987		
**23**	**Are You Gonna Be My Girl**	**Jet**	**2003**	**1**	**68 (2013)**
24	Walking on a Dream	Empire of the Sun	2008	4	
25	Throw Your Arms Around Me	Hunters & Collectors	1984		2 (1989), 2 (1990), 4 (1991), 2 (1998), 23 (2009)
**26**	**Never Be Like You**	**Flume featuring Kai**	**2016**	**1**	**8 (2020)**
27	Can't Get You Out of My Head	Kylie Minogue	2001		
28	Straight Lines	Silverchair	2007	2	90 (2013)
29	Under the Milky Way	The Church	1988		14 (1990), 31 (1991)
30	The Horses	Daryl Braithwaite	1990		
31	Highway to Hell	AC/DC	1979		
32	Torn	Natalie Imbruglia	1997		
**33**	**One Crowded Hour**	**Augie March**	**2006**	**1**	**59 (2009), 24 (2013)**
34	Booster Seat	Spacey Jane	2020	2	
35	Great Southern Land	Icehouse	1982		
36	Treaty (Radio Mix)	Yothu Yindi	1991		83 (1991)
37	Back in Black	AC/DC	1980		91 (2009)
38	Better Be Home Soon	Crowded House	1988		
39	Reckless	Australian Crawl	1983		
40	Covered in Chrome	Violent Soho	2013	14	4 (2020)
41	Prisoner of Society	The Living End	1997	15	18 (1998), 34 (2009), 20 (2013)
42	Magnolia	Gang of Youths	2015	21	6 (2020)
43	Joker & the Thief	Wolfmother	2005	9	72 (2013)
44	Into My Arms	Nick Cave and the Bad Seeds	1997	18	84 (1998), 36 (2009), 46 (2013)
45	Eagle Rock	Daddy Cool	1971		90 (1989)
46	Shooting Stars	Bag Raiders	2009	18	
47	Solid Rock	Goanna	1982		
**48**	**Riptide**	**Vance Joy**	**2013**	**1**	**13 (2020)**
49	It's Nice to Be Alive	Ball Park Music	2011	31	17 (2020)
50	Holy Grail	Hunters & Collectors	1992	54 (1993)	68 (1998)
51	Brother	Matt Corby	2011	3	42 (2013), 10 (2020)
52	The Special Two	Missy Higgins	2004	31 (2005)	
53	Better in Blak	Thelma Plum	2019	9	
54	I Touch Myself	Divinyls	1990		
55	My People	The Presets	2007	18	77 (2013)
56	Working Class Man	Jimmy Barnes	1985		
**57**	**Wish You Well**	**Bernard Fanning**	**2005**	**1**	
58	Frontier Psychiatrist	The Avalanches	2000	6	27 (2013)
59	Need You Tonight	INXS	1987		
60	Let Me Down Easy	Gang of Youths	2017	2	19 (2020)
**61**	**Talk Is Cheap**	**Chet Faker**	**2014**	**1**	**11 (2020)**
62	Australia Street	Sticky Fingers	2013	70	15 (2020)
63	I Was Only 19 (A Walk in the Light Green)	Redgum	1983		
64	Cosby Sweater	Hilltop Hoods	2014	3	20 (2020)
**65**	**Confidence**	**Ocean Alley**	**2018**	**1**	**35 (2020)**
66	Power and the Passion	Midnight Oil	1982		88 (1989)
67	! (The Song Formerly Known As)	Regurgitator	1997	6 (1998)	70 (2013)
68	Chemical Heart	Grinspoon	2002	2	63 (2013)
69	Weather with You	Crowded House	1991		
70	(Baby I've Got You) On My Mind	Powderfinger	2003	4	
71	Jimmy Recard	Drapht	2008	10	
72	Freak	Silverchair	1997	13	78 (2013)
73	1955	Hilltop Hoods featuring Montaigne and Tom Thum	2016	4	36 (2020)
74	London Still	The Waifs	2002	3	
75	The Unguarded Moment	The Church	1981		42 (1989), 57 (1990), 70 (1991)
76	4ever	The Veronicas	2005		
77	Weir	Killing Heidi	1999	2	
78	Black Fingernails, Red Wine	Eskimo Joe	2006	2	
79	Hello	The Cat Empire	2003	6	96 (2013)
80	We Are the People	Empire of the Sun	2008	68	
81	Berlin Chair	You Am I	1993	23 (1994)	61 (1998), 52 (2009), 66 (2013)
82	High	Peking Duk featuring Nicole Millar	2014	2	32 (2020)
83	Cigarettes Will Kill You	Ben Lee	1998	2	95 (2013)
84	Streets of Your Town	The Go-Betweens	1988		
85	Delete	DMA's	2014	48	21 (2020)
86	Hearts a Mess	Gotye	2006	8	77 (2009), 12 (2013)
87	The Deepest Sighs, the Frankest Shadows	Gang of Youths	2017	5	52 (2020)
88	Chateau	Angus & Julia Stone	2017	3	43 (2020)
89	Hertz	Amyl and the Sniffers	2021	28	
90	Black Betty	Spiderbait	2004	5	
**91**	**No Aphrodisiac**	**The Whitlams**	**1997**	**1**	**36 (1998), 58 (2013)**
92	Electric Blue	Icehouse	1987		
93	Since I Left You	The Avalanches	2000	8 (2001)	
94	Clair de Lune	Flight Facilities featuring Christine Hoberg	2012	17	25 (2020)
95	Calypso	Spiderbait	1996	23 (1997)	
96	Evie	Stevie Wright	1974		
97	I Want You	Savage Garden	1996		
98	Red Right Hand	Nick Cave and the Bad Seeds	1994		96 (1998)
99	Blue Sky Mine	Midnight Oil	1990		
100	Better	The Screaming Jets	1991		

=== #101–200 ===
#	Song	Artist	Year	Annual Hottest 100 position	Previous special occasion Hottest 100 position/s
101	Spinning Around	Kylie Minogue	2000		
102	Chandelier	Sia	2014	9	53 (2020)
103	Just Ace	Grinspoon	1997	18 (1998)	88 (1998)
104	Catch My Disease	Ben Lee	2005	2	
**105**	**Buy Me a Pony**	**Spiderbait**	**1996**	1	86 (1998), 62 (2013)
106	Carrion	Parkway Drive	2007		
107	Truly Madly Deeply	Savage Garden	1997		
108	Lanterns	Birds of Tokyo	2013	22	
109	Blood	The Middle East	2009	64	
110	Better Days	Pete Murray	2005		
111	Feeding the Family	Spacey Jane	2017		
**112**	**Amazing**	**Alex Lloyd**	**2001**	1	
113	What's My Scene?	Hoodoo Gurus	1987		
114	To the Moon and Back	Savage Garden	1996		
115	In the Summertime	Thirsty Merc	2004		
116	Island Home	Christine Anu	1995	47	
117	Crave You	Flight Facilities featuring Giselle	2010	19	39 (2020)
118	Wide Open Road	The Triffids	1986		68 (1989), 49 (1990), 52 (1991)
119	Boys in Town	Divinyls	1981		
120	Monsters	Something for Kate	2001	2	88 (2013)
121	Knees	Ocean Alley	2018	10	
122	Took the Children Away	Archie Roach	1990		
123	Southern Sun	Boy & Bear	2013	41	
124	(I'm) Stranded	The Saints	1976		51 (1989)
125	The Worst Person Alive	G Flip	2023	2	
126	Forever Young	Youth Group	2006	21	
127	Leaving Home	Jebediah	1997	10	50 (1998), 98 (2013)
128	Blow Up the Pokies	The Whitlams	1999		
129	What About Me	Shannon Noll	2004		
130	Elephant	Tame Impala	2012	7	66 (2020)
131	Smoko	The Chats	2017		
132	Plans	Birds of Tokyo	2010	4	
133	Robbery	Lime Cordiale	2019	7	
134	Steer	Missy Higgins	2007	53	
**135**	**Hoops**	**The Rubens**	**2015**	1	46 (2020)
136	This Boy's in Love	The Presets	2008	8	
137	Fader	The Temper Trap	2009	21	
138	Zebra	John Butler Trio	2003	8	
139	New Sensation	INXS	1987		
140	Adore	Amy Shark	2016	2	51 (2020)
141	Harpoon	Jebediah	1997	7 (1998)	91 (2013)
142	Absolutely Everybody	Vanessa Amorosi	1999		
143	Pleasure and Pain	Divinyls	1985		
144	The Honeymoon Is Over	The Cruel Sea	1993	9	
145	Lots of Nothing	Spacey Jane	2021	3	
146	Parlez Vous Francais?	Art vs. Science	2009	2	
147	Strawberry Kisses	Nikki Webster	2001		
148	Rum Rage	Sticky Fingers	2014		33 (2020)
149	Charlie	Mallrat	2019	3	79 (2020)
150	Addicted	Bliss n Eso	2010	23	
151	Broken Leg	Bluejuice	2009	5	
152	Slow Mover	Angie McMahon	2017	33	
153	Where the City Meets the Sea	The Getaway Plan	2008	59	
154	Come On Mess Me Up	Cub Sport	2016	24	81 (2020)
155	Pittsburgh	The Amity Affliction	2014	22	
156	Is This How You Feel?	The Preatures	2013	9	94 (2020)
157	Before Too Long	Paul Kelly and the Coloured Girls	1986		
158	Saving Up	Dom Dolla	2023	3	
159	Rush	Troye Sivan	2023	8	
160	Alone with You	Sunnyboys	1981		56 (1989)
161	From the Sea	Eskimo Joe	2004	3	
162	UFO	Sneaky Sound System	2006		
163	This Heart Attack	Faker	2007	5	
164	Chains	Tina Arena	1994		
165	U Should Not Be Doing That	Amyl and the Sniffers	2024	34	
166	You Were Right	Rüfüs Du Sol	2015	12	
167	Songbird	Bernard Fanning	2005	14	
168	She Only Loves Me When I'm There	Ball Park Music	2014	19	
169	January 26	A.B. Original featuring Dan Sultan	2016	16	
170	Never Had So Much Fun	Frenzal Rhomb	1999	26	
171	Oysters in My Pocket	Royel Otis	2022		
172	Breathe Me	Sia	2004	87	
173	Exactly How You Are	Ball Park Music	2017	18	
174	Mascara	Killing Heidi	1999	14	
175	Confide in Me	Kylie Minogue	1994	30	
176	**Say Nothing**	**Flume featuring May-a**	**2022**	1	
177	Follow the Sun	Xavier Rudd	2012	44	
178	Better Than	John Butler Trio	2007	4	
179	Where the Wild Roses Grow	Nick Cave and the Bad Seeds featuring Kylie Minogue	1995	8	
180	Hopelessly Devoted to You	Olivia Newton-John	1978		
181	Dinosaurs	Ruby Fields	2018	9	84 (2020)
182	Edge of Town	Middle Kids	2016		
183	Yellow Mellow	Ocean Alley	2013		
184	Losing It	Fisher	2018	2	95 (2020)
185	No Secrets	The Angels	1980		
186	I Am Woman	Helen Reddy	1972		
187	Greg! The Stop Sign!!	TISM	1995	10	
188	Feeding Line	Boy & Bear	2011	4	
189	Rushing Back	Flume featuring Vera Blue	2019	2	
190	Borderline	Tame Impala	2019	18	
191	Live It Up	Mental As Anything	1985		
192	Gold Snafu	Sticky Fingers	2014	20	58 (2020)
193	So Beautiful	Pete Murray	2003		
194	Don't Change	INXS	1982		
195	Cattle and Cane	The Go-Betweens	1983		11 (1989), 27 (1990), 96 (1991)
196	Hot Potato	The Wiggles	1994		
197	Blackfella/Whitefella	Warumpi Band	1985		
198	Jungle	Tash Sultana	2016	3	49 (2020)
199	Caught in the Crowd	Kate Miller-Heidke	2008		
200	The Festival Song	Pez featuring 360 and Hailey Cramer	2008	7	

== Statistics ==
=== Artists with multiple entries ===
A maximum of three songs from each artist were included in the official voting shortlist.

#	Artist	Entries
4	Bernard Fanning	6, 14, 57, 70
3	Hilltop Hoods	2, 64, 73
3	Crowded House	5, 38, 69
3	Powderfinger	6, 14, 70
3	Jimmy Barnes (Note: Two with Cold Chisel (7, 8), one solo (56))	7, 8, 56
3	AC/DC	13, 31, 37
3	Silverchair	17, 28, 72
3	Midnight Oil	18, 66, 99
3	Gang of Youths	42, 60, 87
2	INXS	1, 59
2	The Veronicas	3, 76
2	Missy Higgins	4, 52
2	Cold Chisel	7, 8
2	Paul Kelly	9, 22
2	Gotye	10, 86
2	Angus & Julia Stone	20, 88
2	Empire of the Sun	24, 80
2	Hunters & Collectors	25, 50
2	The Church	29, 75
2	Icehouse	35, 92
2	Nick Cave and the Bad Seeds	44, 98
2	The Avalanches	58, 93
2	Spiderbait	90, 95

=== Songs by decade ===
Decade	Number of songs
1970s	5
1980s	21
1990s	23
2000s	27
2010s	22
2020s	2

== See also ==
- Triple J Hottest 100 Australian Albums of All Time, 2011
