= Live with the Melbourne Symphony Orchestra =

Live album by Flight Facilities
- Released: 18 December 2015
- Recorded: 2015
- Venue: Sidney Myer Music Bowl, Melbourne
- Length: 81:08
- Label: Future Classic

Flight Facilities chronology
Down to Earth (2014)	Live with the Melbourne Symphony Orchestra (2015)	Forever (2021)

Live with the Melbourne Symphony Orchestra is the first live album by Australian electronic duo Flight Facilities with the Melbourne Symphony Orchestra. The album was recorded live at the Annual Southern Airlines concert at the Melbourne Festival in 2015. The album was released in December 2015. The album did not enter the ARIA Albums Chart, but peaked at number 19 on the ARIA Digital Albums chart.

At the ARIA Music Awards of 2016, the album won the ARIA Award for Best Classical Album. The award prompted controversy from The Australian's Matthew Westwood, The Sydney Morning Herald's Bernard Zuel and Tone Deaf's Greg Moskovitch and amongst the Australian classical community, questioning how an electronic duo were nominated in this category. Toby Chadd, manager of ABC Classics, told The Australian: "The album consists of Flight Facilities' original electronic music with the accompaniment of an orchestra. It feels like something is potentially wrong with the ARIA system to allow an album whose credentials are clearly in no way classical to win the classical award. It has the potential to damage the integrity of that award." Hugo Gruzman of Flight Facilities said "We're stoked to be nominated for Best Classical Album a year after being nominated for Best Dance Album—we don't know how but thanks very much." An ARIA representative informed The Australian that the "creative collaboration" between Flight Facilities and the Melbourne Symphony Orchestra met eligibility criteria for the award and the winner was determined by a "specialist classic music ARIA judging panel".

== Track listing ==
1. "Intro" (featuring Reggie Watts) – 2:07
2. "Got to Have" by James Curd (Flight Facilities Remix) – 8:42
3. "Foreign Language" (featuring George Maple) – 3:59
4. "Waking Bliss" (featuring Owl Eyes) – 4:10
5. "With You" (featuring Kurt Kristen) – 4:52
6. "Sunshine" (featuring Reggie Watts) – 4:52
7. "Dream in the Desert" (featuring Broadhurst) by The Lowbrows (Flight Facilities Remix) – 7:55
8. "Two Bodies" (featuring Emma Louise) – 6:03
9. "Heart Attack" (featuring Owl Eyes) – 6:04
10. "I Didn't Believe" (featuring Owl Eyes) – 3:33
11. "Merimbula" – 4:02
12. "Crave You" (featuring Owl Eyes) – 6:01
13. "Apollo" (featuring Katie Noonan) – 4:43
14. "Clair de Lune" (featuring Owl Eyes) – 7:39
15. "Shine a Light" by The C90s with Touch Sensitive, Surahn, Kurt Kristen, Owl Eyes, Katie Noonan, George Maple, Reggie Watts and Emma Louise (Flight Facilities Remix) – 6:26

== Charts ==
Chart performance for Live with the Melbourne Symphony Orchestra
Chart (2015)	Peak position
Australian Albums (ARIA)	108
Australian Digital Albums (ARIA)	19
