= Adventure Club =

Canadian electronic dance music duo

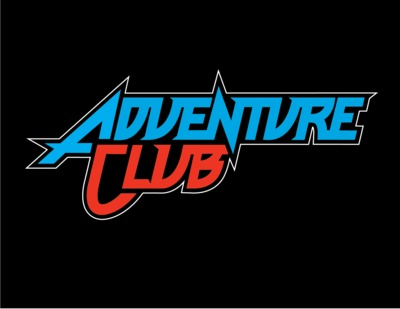
- Adventure Club logo

Background information
- Origin: Montreal, Quebec, Canada
- Genres: Dubstep, electro house, drumstep, progressive house
- Years active: 2011–present
- Labels: UKF; Spinnin'; Monstercat
- Members: Christian Srigley; Leighton James
- Website: weareadventureclub.com

Adventure Club is a Canadian electronic dance music duo composed of Christian Srigley and Leighton James, based out of Montreal, Quebec. The duo began as a hardcore pop-punk band before venturing into electronic dance music in 2011. They are best known for their remixes of "Lullabies" by Yuna and "Crave You" from Flight Facilities. The duo's debut album Red // Blue was released on 2 December 2016.

== History ==
The duo formed while attending high school in Montreal as a hardcore pop-punk band, but later decided to move on to electronic dance music after getting bored with the pop-punk sound and finding success with a dubstep remix of "Daisy" by American alternative-rock Brand New. The remix climbed the charts on Hype Machine, a website that gathers popular songs from music blogs, which convinced them to make a change to producing EDM.

Some of the major influences to their sound include Tiësto, Flux Pavilion, Greeley Estates, Bring Me the Horizon and Skrillex. The duo's signature sound includes high-pitched female vocals with melodic sounds and heavy dubstep synths. Through online social network sites, the duo was able to increase their exposure by getting their first music video of "Everything to Me" by LIPS on the UKF Dubstep's YouTube channel. The remix was produced and directed by Cedric Sequerra of LuckyFish Productions.

The duo is signed under the management team of The Standard Group. Some of their signature sounds can also be credited to the program that they use to produce their music. Cakewalk SONAR is a less-commonly-used program in electronic dance music where FL Studio and Ableton Live are typically used. Some of the other equipment and software that they use include a Fireface console, Traktor Pro, Audio 6 and Kontrol X1.

The duo has toured across North America, as well as parts of Europe and Australia and have played at various music festivals including the 2015 American Electric Daisy Carnival in Las Vegas, Nevada. They also made their first appearance at the Ultra Music Festival 2013 in Miami.

The duo's remix of "Crave You" by Flight Facilities and Giselle Rosselli was featured in the episode "Restraint" (2012) of the MTV television series Teen Wolf.

The duo hosted a special volunteering event at the Los Angeles Regional Food Bank in April 2014. They invited fans to come out for a meet-n-greet and to help package food for the poor.

The duo's single "Rise and Fall (featuring Krewella)" was featured on the MTV television series Eye Candy.

The duo's single "Do I See Color" was featured on a 2012 Coca-Cola commercial with dancer Marquese Scott.

On 2 December 2016, Adventure Club released their debut album titled Red // Blue, containing lead single "Dreams" featuring ELEA and "Firestorm" with Sara Diamond.

== Discography ==
=== Studio albums ===
List of extended plays, showing title, date released, labels and track listing
Title	Details
Red // Blue	Released: December 2, 2016; Label: BMG Rights Management; Format: CD, digital download
Love // Chaos	Released: February 11, 2022; Label: Ultra Records; Format: CD, digital download

=== Extended plays ===
List of extended plays, showing title, date released, labels and track listing
Title	Details	Track listing
Calling All Heroes	Released: October 22, 2013; Label: BMG Rights Management; Format: CD, vinyl, digital download	List: 1. "Gold" (featuring Yuna; 2. "Wonder" (featuring The Kite String Tangle); 3. "Crash"; 4. "Thunderclap"
The Death or Glory Sessions	Released: October 18, 2019; Label: Ultra Records; Format: Digital download	List: 1. "Death or Glory"; 2. "Wolfpack"

=== Singles ===
Year	Single	Peak chart positions	Certifications	Album
Year	Single	CAN	Certifications	Album
2012	"Do I See Color"	—		Non-album singles
2012	"Wait"	—		Non-album singles
2012	"Rise & Fall" (featuring Krewella)	—		Non-album singles
2012	"Need Your Heart" (featuring Kai)	—		Non-album singles
2012	"Retro City"	—		Non-album singles
2013	"Wonder" (featuring The Kite String Tangle)	37	MC: Platinum	Calling All Heroes
2014	"Unleash (Life In Color Anthem 2014) (with Solano featuring Zak Waters)	—		Non-album single
2014	"Fade" (featuring Zak Waters)	—		Red // Blue
2015	"Crash 2.0" (vs. DallasK)	—	MC: Gold	Red // Blue
2016	"Limitless" (featuring Delaney Jane)	—		Red // Blue
2018	"Feel It Still" (featuring Sara Diamond)	—		Discovered, Vol.1
2018	"Follow Me" (with Snails featuring Sara Diamond)	—		Non-album singles
2019	"MakeDamnSure" (with Modern Machines and Saint Slumber)	—		Non-album singles
2019	"Next Life" (with Crankdat featuring Krewella)	—		Love // Chaos
2019	"Life Long After Death" (with Quix featuring BadXchannels)	—		Non-album single
2019	"Already Know" (with Said the Sky featuring Caly Bevier)	—		Love // Chaos
2020	"Rebellious" (featuring Yuna)	—		Love // Chaos
2020	"Back to You" (featuring Sara Diamond)	—		Love // Chaos
2020	"High Like This" (with Squired featuring Dia Frampton)	—		Love // Chaos
2020	"Where We Are" (with Bear Grillz and JT Roach)	—		Friends: The Album
2020	"Broken Love" (featuring Cammie Robinson)	—		Love // Chaos
2021	"Anywhere" (with Armnhmr and Haliene)	—		Love // Chaos
2021	"You'll Never Be Alone" (with Kaivon)	—		Love // Chaos
2021	"Safe With Me" (with Soar featuring Luna)	—		Love // Chaos
2021	"Color Blind" (with Nurko featuring Dayseeker)	—		Love // Chaos
2021	"Here"	—		Love // Chaos
2021	"Drive" (with Beauz featuring Tilian)	—		Love // Chaos
2021	"Never Surrender" (with Codeko featuring Sarah De Warren)	—		Love // Chaos
2022	"Away From Myself" (with Alrt)	—		Love // Chaos
2022	"Leviathan" (with Grumgully)	—		Non-album singles
2023	"You Found Me" (with Jessica Audiffred and Clara Park)	—		Non-album singles
2023	"You Can't Break Me" (with Sullivan King and Atreyu)	—		Non-album singles
2023	"Feels Like You" (with Codeko)	—		Non-album singles
2023	"How Do I Say Goodbye" (featuring Delaney Jane)	—		Non-album singles
2024	"Voices" (featuring Medyk)	—		Non-album singles
2024	"Hero" (with Jessica Audiffred)	—		Non-album singles
2024	"Play the Game" (with Bear Grillz featuring Craig Mabbitt of Escape the Fate)	—		Non-album singles
2025	"Set Me Free" (with Kompany and Sara Benyo)	—		Non-album singles
2025	"Move" (with Coleman Hell)	—		Non-album singles
2025	"Nothing to Lose" (with Oliverse)	—		Non-album singles
2025	"Light Me Up" (with Flight School featuring Rêve)	—		Non-album singles
"—" denotes releases that did not chart

=== Remixes ===
Title	Year	Original artist
"Please Don't Go" (Adventure Club Remix)	2010	Mike Posner
"Love Lost" (Adventure Club Remix)	2010	The Temper Trap
"Daisy" (Adventure Club Remix)	2011	Brand New
"Remember (Walking in the Sand)" (Adventure Club Remix)	2011	The Shangri-Las
"Sunlight" (Adventure Club Remix)	2011	Diana Vickers
"We Don't Eat" (Adventure Club Remix)	2011	James Vincent McMorrow
"Till the World Ends" (Adventure Club Remix)	2011	Britney Spears
"Broken Lungs" (Adventure Club Remix)	2011	Thrice
"Put On" (Adventure Club Remix)	2011	Young Jeezy (featuring Kanye West)
"Teach Me How to Jerk" (Adventure Club Remix)	2011	Audio Push
"Everything to Me" (Adventure Club Remix)	2011	Lips
"Collect Call" (Adventure Club Remix)	2011	Metric
"Crave You" (Adventure Club Remix)	2011	Flight Facilities (featuring Giselle Rosselli)
"To a Friend" (Adventure Club Remix)	2012	Alexisonfire
"Lullabies" (Adventure Club Remix)	2012	Yuna
"Youth" (Adventure Club Remix)	2013	Foxes
"Shadow Of The Sun" (Adventure Club Remix)	2014	Max Elto
"Hurricane" (Adventure Club Remix)	2015	MS MR
"Undercover" (Adventure Club Remix)	2017	Kehlani
"Ghost Voices" (Adventure Club Remix)	2018	Virtual Self
"Under" (Adventure Club Remix)	2019	Aosoon
"Already Know" (Cinematic Remix)	2020	Adventure Club and Said The Sky
"Your Eyes Tell" (Adventure Club and Soar Remix)	2020	BTS
"F*ck Your Sunshine" (Adventure Club Remix)	2022	Łaszewo

=== DJ mixes ===
Year	Title
2013	Superheroes Anonymous Volume 1
2013	Superheroes Anonymous Volume 2
2013	Superheroes Anonymous Volume 3
2013	Superheroes Anonymous Volume 4: Live on Tour Edition
2014	Superheroes Anonymous 5: Road Trip Edition
2015	Superheroes Anonymous 6: Road to Red Rocks
2015	Superheroes Anonymous 7: Road to Electric Zoo
2015	Superheroes Anonymous 8: Road to Big Week NYC
2018	Superheroes Anonymous 9: Survival
2019	Superheroes Anonymous 10: Death or Glory
2020	Superheroes Anonymous 11: Never Surrender

== See also ==
- List of dubstep musicians
- List of Montreal music groups
