= Forever (Flight Facilities album) =

Studio album by Flight Facilities
- Released: 12 November 2021
- Length: 47:42
- Label: Future Classic

Flight Facilities chronology
| Live with the Melbourne Symphony Orchestra (2015) | Forever (2021) |

Singles from Forever
- 1. "Lights Up" Released: 5 May 2021; 2. "The Ghost" Released: 11 June 2021; 3. "Move" Released: 5 August 2021; 4. "Forever" Released: 30 September 2021; 5. "Heavy" Released: 5 November 2021

Forever is the second studio album by Australian electronic duo Flight Facilities, released on 12 November 2021 by Future Classic.

The album was announced on 30 September 2021 alongside the title track.

In a statement the duo said "The best way to describe this album is a combination of where we've been, where we are, and where we're going. As true as it was from our first release, the foundations and glue for all our work has consistently been 'collaboration'. While our musical journey has always been an intentional exploration of multiple genres, our hearts and roots lie on the dance floor. We applied that same explorative ethos to this record, taking a concerted delve into the previously untouched niches and eras of dance. It's been a long time coming, and only the same time will tell if it was worth the wait."

The album was supported by the Forever Tour, commencing in Perth on 12 March 2022.

At the AIR Awards of 2022, the album won Best Independent Dance or Electronica Album or EP.

== Track listing ==
Forever track listing
| No. | Title | Writer(s) | Producer(s) | Length |
|---|---|---|---|---|
| 1. | "Lights Up" (with Channel Tres) | Hugo Gruzman; James Lyell; Jono Ma; Sheldon Young | Flight Facilities | 3:11 |
| 2. | "What I Want" (with Broods) | Gruzman; Lyell; Georgia Nott; Caleb Nott; Nate Campany; Kyle Shearer | | 3:30 |
| 3. | "Heavy" (featuring Your Smith) | Gruzman; Lyell; Ma; Caroline Smith | Flight Facilities; Ma | 3:22 |
| 4. | "The Ghost" | Gruzman; Lyell; Ma | Flight Facilities; Ma | 4:04 |
| 5. | "Altitude" | Gruzman; Lyell; Ma; Jessica Higgs; Davide Rossi | | 4:14 |
| 6. | "Wait and See" (with Brux) | Gruzman; Lyell; Ma; Brux | | 6:13 |
| 7. | "Forever" (with Broods) | Gruzman; Lyell; Ma; Miranda Kilbey; Elektra Kilbey; G. Nott | Flight Facilities; Ma | 3:48 |
| 8. | "Move" (with Drama) | Gruzman; Lyell; Ma; Via Rosa; Na'el Shehade | Flight Facilities; Ma; Drama | 4:23 |
| 9. | "Pain" (featuring Jordy Felix) | Gruzman; Lyell; Thomas Young; Jaden Parkes; Jordan Arts; Joshua Fountain; Djeisan Suskov; Emma Louise | | 5:20 |
| 10. | "Stay" (with Your Smith) | Gruzman; Lyell; Ma; Mereki Beach; Smith | | 3:45 |
| 11. | "If Only I Could" (with Emma Louise) | Gruzman; Lyell; Ma; Young; Parkes; Arts; Fountain; Suskov; Louise | | 5:52 |
| Total length: | | | | 47:42 |

== Charts ==
Chart performance for Forever
| Chart (2021) | Peak position |
|---|---|
| Australian Albums (ARIA) | 6 |
