= Triple J's Hottest 100 of the 2010s =

Most popular songs of the decade in Australia

2010s Triple J Hottest 100

Countdown details
- Date of countdown: 14 March 2020
- Votes cast: 1,869,659

Countdown highlights
- Winning song: Tame Impala "The Less I Know the Better"
- Most entries: Flume (7 tracks)

Chronology
← Previous; 2019	Next → 2020

The Triple J Hottest 100 of the 2010s was held on 14 March 2020. It is a countdown of the most popular songs of the 2010s as chosen by listeners of Australian radio station Triple J. 1.8 million votes were cast by listeners choosing their top ten songs of the decade.

Tame Impala's "The Less I Know the Better" was voted into first place.

== Background ==
The Triple J Hottest 100 of the 2010s allowed members of the public to vote online for their top ten songs of the decade, which were then used to calculate the decade's 100 most popular songs. Any song initially released between 1 January 2010 and 31 December 2019 was eligible for the decade's Hottest 100.

On 23 January 2020, Triple J first announced that a 2010s countdown would take place. Voting opened on 11 February 2020, and closed on 9 March 2020. Between 10 and 13 March, Triple J presenters Lucy Smith, Lewis Hobba, and Michael Hing progressively announced the songs that ranked between No. 200 and No. 101 in the countdown. Voting in recent countdowns has been restricted to the preceding year. There have been some exceptions, namely the Hottest 100 Australian Albums of All Time in 2011, and the Hottest 100 of the Past 20 Years in 2013. This is the first countdown that charts the best songs of a decade.

=== Projections ===
Based on media reports following the announcement of the existence of the countdown, some of the most frequently mentioned contenders are Frank Ocean, Lorde, Lana Del Rey, Kendrick Lamar, Flume, and Beyoncé. Once voting closed, bookmakers' three most likely songs to take No. 1 were Gotye's "Somebody That I Used to Know" (featuring Kimbra), Arctic Monkeys' "Do I Wanna Know?" and Rüfüs' "Innerbloom", both behind Gotye.

== Full list ==
Note: Australian artists

Full list, with placing, title, artist(s), country of origin, year released, and original position shown
#	Song	Artist	Country of origin	Year	Annual Hottest 100 position	Position in "20 Years of Triple JJJ" list
1	The Less I Know the Better	Tame Impala	Australia	2015	4	
2	Somebody That I Used to Know	Gotye featuring Kimbra	Australia/New Zealand	2011	1	9
3	Do I Wanna Know?	Arctic Monkeys	United Kingdom	2013	4	
4	Covered in Chrome	Violent Soho	Australia	2013	14	
5	Innerbloom	Rüfüs Du Sol	Australia	2015	—	
6	Magnolia	Gang of Youths	Australia	2015	21	
7	Pumped Up Kicks	Foster the People	United States	2010	32	94
8	Never Be Like You	Flume featuring Kai	Australia/Canada	2016	1	
9	Big Jet Plane	Angus & Julia Stone	Australia	2010	1	81
10	Brother	Matt Corby	Australia	2011	3	42
11	Talk Is Cheap	Chet Faker	Australia	2014	1	
12	Breezeblocks	Alt-J	United Kingdom	2012	3	67
13	Riptide	Vance Joy	Australia	2013	1	
14	Runaway	Kanye West featuring Pusha T	United States	2010	14	
15	Australia Street	Sticky Fingers	Australia	2013	70	
16	Royals	Lorde	New Zealand	2013	2	
17	It's Nice to Be Alive	Ball Park Music	Australia	2011	31	
18	Holdin On	Flume	Australia	2012	4	
19	Let Me Down Easy	Gang of Youths	Australia	2017	2	
20	Cosby Sweater	Hilltop Hoods	Australia	2014	3	
21	Delete	DMA's	Australia	2014	48	
22	Midnight City	M83	France	2011	5	
23	King Kunta	Kendrick Lamar	United States	2015	2	
24	Niggas in Paris	Kanye West and Jay-Z	United States	2011	98	
25	Clair de Lune	Flight Facilities featuring Christine Hoberg	Australia/United States	2012	17	
26	Let It Happen	Tame Impala	Australia	2015	5	
27	3005	Childish Gambino	United States	2013	43	
28	Redbone	Childish Gambino	United States	2016	5	
29	Video Games	Lana Del Rey	United States	2011	6	99
30	Little Talks	Of Monsters and Men	Iceland	2011	2 (2012)	92
31	Tokyo (Vampires & Wolves)	The Wombats	United Kingdom	2010	8	
32	High	Peking Duk featuring Nicole Millar	Australia	2014	2	
33	Rum Rage	Sticky Fingers	Australia	2014	—	
34	Lost	Frank Ocean	United States	2012	8	
35	Confidence	Ocean Alley	Australia	2018	1	
36	1955	Hilltop Hoods featuring Montaigne and Tom Thum	Australia	2016	4	
37	Stolen Dance	Milky Chance	Germany	2013	4 (2014)	
38	Levels	Avicii	Sweden	2011	—	
39	Crave You	Flight Facilities featuring Giselle Rosselli	Australia	2010	19	
40	Latch	Disclosure featuring Sam Smith	United Kingdom	2012	21	
41	Believe (Like a Version)	DMA's	Australia	2016	6	
42	R U Mine?	Arctic Monkeys	United Kingdom	2012	40	
43	Chateau	Angus & Julia Stone	Australia	2017	3	
44	Shake It Out	Florence and the Machine	United Kingdom	2011	13	
45	Lonely Boy	The Black Keys	United States	2011	2	61
46	Hoops	The Rubens	Australia	2015	1	
47	I Will Wait	Mumford & Sons	United Kingdom	2012	5	
48	HyperParadise (Flume Remix)	Hermitude	Australia	2012	18	
49	Jungle	Tash Sultana	Australia	2016	3	
50	Get Lucky	Daft Punk featuring Pharrell Williams and Nile Rodgers	France/United States	2013	3	
51	Adore	Amy Shark	Australia	2016	2	
52	The Deepest Sighs, the Frankest Shadows	Gang of Youths	Australia	2017	5	
53	Chandelier	Sia	Australia	2014	9	
54	Tongue Tied	Grouplove	United States	2011	16	
55	Bangarang	Skrillex featuring Sirah	United States	2011	25 (2012)	
56	Thrift Shop	Macklemore & Ryan Lewis featuring Wanz	United States	2012	1	
57	Humble	Kendrick Lamar	United States	2017	1	
58	Gold Snafu	Sticky Fingers	Australia	2014	20	
59	Teenage Crime	Adrian Lux	Sweden	2010	6	
60	Swimming Pools (Drank)	Kendrick Lamar	United States	2012	71	
61	Green Light	Lorde	New Zealand	2017	6	
62	Thinkin Bout You	Frank Ocean	United States	2012	56	
63	The Buzz	Hermitude featuring Mataya and Young Tapz	Australia	2015	8	
64	Innerbloom (What So Not remix)	Rüfüs Du Sol	Australia	2016	30	
65	Feels Like We Only Go Backwards	Tame Impala	Australia	2012	9	
66	Elephant	Tame Impala	Australia	2012	7	
67	I Love It	Hilltop Hoods featuring Sia	Australia	2011	10	
68	212	Azealia Banks featuring Lazy Jay	United States/Belgium	2011	—	
69	Drop the Game	Flume and Chet Faker	Australia	2013	5	
70	7	Catfish and the Bottlemen	United Kingdom	2016	19	
71	Bad Guy	Billie Eilish	United States	2019	1	
72	Monster	Kanye West featuring Jay-Z, Rick Ross, Nicki Minaj and Bon Iver	United States/Trinidad and Tobago	2010	88	
73	Why'd You Only Call Me When You're High?	Arctic Monkeys	United Kingdom	2013	6	
74	Dancing on My Own	Robyn	Sweden	2010	—	
75	Feel So Close	Calvin Harris	United Kingdom	2011	11	
76	Sicko Mode	Travis Scott featuring Drake	United States/Canada	2018	3	
77	Black Skinhead	Kanye West	United States	2013	20	
78	Awkward	San Cisco	Australia	2011	7	
79	Charlie	Mallrat	Australia	2019	3	
80	Ultralight Beam	Kanye West featuring Chance the Rapper, The-Dream, Kelly Price and Kirk Franklin	United States	2016	22	
81	Come On Mess Me Up	Cub Sport	Australia	2016	24	
82	On Top	Flume featuring T.Shirt	Australia/United States	2012	67	
83	Painkiller	Ruel	Australia	2019	22	
84	Dinosaurs	Ruby Fields	Australia	2018	9	
85	No Role Modelz	J. Cole	United States	2014	—	
86	Greek Tragedy	The Wombats	United Kingdom	2015	29	
87	Resolution	Matt Corby	Australia	2013	8	
88	Gooey	Glass Animals	United Kingdom	2014	12	
89	Undercover Martyn	Two Door Cinema Club	United Kingdom	2010	21	
90	This Is America	Childish Gambino	United States	2018	4	
91	Loving Is Easy	Rex Orange County featuring Benny Sings	United Kingdom/Netherlands	2017	—	
92	M.A.A.D City	Kendrick Lamar featuring MC Eiht	United States	2012	—	
93	Sleepless	Flume featuring Jezzabell Doran	Australia	2011	12 (2012)	
94	Is This How You Feel?	The Preatures	Australia	2013	9	
95	Losing It	Fisher	Australia	2018	2	
96	Get Free	Major Lazer featuring Amber Coffman	United States	2012	6	
97	Rolling in the Deep	Adele	United Kingdom	2010	—	
98	You & Me (Flume Remix)	Disclosure featuring Eliza Doolittle	United Kingdom/Australia	2013	63	
99	Dazed & Confused	Ruel	Australia	2018	89	
100	Holocene	Bon Iver	United States	2011	53	

=== #101-200 List ===
#	Song	Artist	Country of origin	Year	Annual Hottest 100 position
101	Ubu	Methyl Ethel	Australia	2017	4
102	Power	Kanye West	United States	2010	—
103	Liquorlip Loaded Gun	Sticky Fingers	Australia	2014	94
104	Cocoon	Catfish and the Bottlemen	United Kingdom	2014	—
105	Take Me Over	Peking Duk featuring Safia	Australia	2014	5
106	Younger	Ruel	Australia	2018	87
107	Dance The Way I Feel	Ou Est le Swimming Pool	United Kingdom	2009	3 (2010)
108	What Can I Do If the Fire Goes Out?	Gang of Youths	Australia	2017	10
109	Sweatpants	Childish Gambino	United States	2014	60
110	Knees	Ocean Alley	Australia	2018	10
111	Addicted	Bliss n Eso	Australia	2010	23
112	You Were Right	Rüfüs Du Sol	Australia	2015	12
113	Rock It	Little Red	Australia	2010	2
114	Young and Beautiful	Lana Del Rey	United States	2013	7
115	On Melancholy Hill	Gorillaz	United Kingdom	2010	42
116	She Only Loves Me When I'm There	Ball Park Music	Australia	2014	19
117	Face to Face	Ruel	Australia	2019	38
118	Free Time	Ruel	Australia	2019	49
119	She's a Riot	The Jungle Giants	Australia	2012	83
120	Roll Up Your Sleeves	Meg Mac	Australia	2014	24
121	Strong	London Grammar	United Kingdom	2013	10
122	Magic Fountain	Art vs. Science	Australia	2010	9
123	Summertime Sadness	Lana Del Rey	United States	2012	86
124	Fuckin' Problems	A$AP Rocky featuring Drake, 2 Chainz & Kendrick Lamar	United States/Canada	2012	79 (2013)
125	Can't Hold Us	Macklemore & Ryan Lewis featuring Ray Dalton	United States	2011	—
126	All of the Lights	Kanye West	United States	2010	—
127	Plans	Birds of Tokyo	Australia	2010	4
128	Money Trees	Kendrick Lamar featuring Jay Rock	United States	2012	—
129	Robbery	Lime Cordiale	Australia	2019	7
130	Ocean Drive	Duke Dumont	United Kingdom	2015	13
131	Fall at Your Feet	Boy & Bear	Australia	2010	5
132	Faded	Zhu	United States	2014	11
133	Sweet	Brockhampton	United States	2017	11
134	Same Love	Macklemore & Ryan Lewis featuring Mary Lambert	United States	2012	15
135	Wet Dreamz	J. Cole	United States	2015	—
136	Lean On	Major Lazer & DJ Snake featuring MØ	United States/France/Denmark	2015	3
137	Say It	Flume featuring Tove Lo	Australia/Sweden	2016	8
138	Sally	Thundamentals featuring Mataya	Australia	2017	8
139	Scott Green	Dune Rats	Australia	2016	34
140	Caress Your Soul	Sticky Fingers	Australia	2012	61
141	Dang!	Mac Miller featuring Anderson .Paak	United States	2016	46
142	My Number	Foals	United Kingdom	2012	29 (2013)
143	Born To Die	Lana Del Rey	United States	2011	34 (2012)
144	Bulls On Parade (Like a Version)	Denzel Curry	United States	2019	5
145	Nights	Frank Ocean	United States	2016	—
146	Lanterns	Birds of Tokyo	Australia	2013	22
147	Better in Blak	Thelma Plum	Australia	2019	9
148	When the Party's Over	Billie Eilish	United States	2018	8
149	Chameleon	Pnau	Australia	2016	11
150	Scary Monsters and Nice Sprites	Skrillex	United States	2010	21 (2011)
151	I Touch Myself (Like a Version)	Lime Cordiale	Australia	2019	17
152	Rushing Back	Flume featuring Vera Blue	Australia	2019	2
153	Groceries	Mallrat	Australia	2018	7
154	Spring Has Sprung	Skegss	Australia	2016	—
155	Arabella	Arctic Monkeys	United Kingdom	2013	18
156	Join the Club	Hockey Dad	Australia	2018	18
157	The Wire	Haim	United States	2013	11
158	Uptown Funk	Mark Ronson featuring Bruno Mars	United Kingdom/United States	2014	6
159	Tennis Court	Lorde	New Zealand	2013	12
160	The Heart Is a Muscle	Gang of Youths	Australia	2017	—
161	Sweet Nothing	Calvin Harris featuring Florence Welch	United Kingdom	2012	11
162	True Lovers	Holy Holy	Australia	2017	40
163	Love$ick	Mura Masa featuring A$AP Rocky	United Kingdom/United States	2016	13
164	Yonkers	Tyler, the Creator	United States	2011	—
165	Feel the Way I Do	The Jungle Giants	Australia	2017	16
166	Drink Too Much	G Flip	Australia	2019	6
167	Alive	Empire of the Sun	Australia	2013	30
168	The Suburbs	Arcade Fire	Canada	2010	58
169	Witchcraft	Pendulum	Australia	2010	48
170	Pyramids	Frank Ocean	United States	2012	—
171	Super Rich Kids	Frank Ocean featuring Earl Sweatshirt	United States	2012	80
172	Feeding Line	Boy & Bear	Australia	2011	4
173	Up in the Clouds	Skegss	Australia	2018	11
174	Lucid Dreams	Juice Wrld	United States	2018	—
175	Fred Astaire	San Cisco	Australia	2012	48
176	Rapunzel	Drapht	Australia	2010	12
177	Brother (Like a Version)	Thundamentals	Australia	2012	49
178	Spectrum (Say My Name) (Calvin Harris remix)	Florence and the Machine	United Kingdom	2012	32
179	Smiles Don't Lie	Thundamentals	Australia	2013	32
180	Laps Around the Sun	Ziggy Alberts	Australia	2018	42
181	Papercuts	Illy featuring Vera Blue	Australia	2016	7
182	Dance Monkey	Tones and I	Australia	2019	4
183	Goosebumps	Travis Scott featuring Kendrick Lamar	United States	2016	—
184	Punching in a Dream	The Naked and Famous	New Zealand	2010	34
185	Glitter	Benee	New Zealand	2019	19
186	Soaked	Benee	New Zealand	2018	58
187	Genghis Khan	Miike Snow	Sweden	2015	15 (2016)
188	Praise The Lord (Da Shine)	A$AP Rocky featuring Skepta	United States/United Kingdom	2018	13
189	Marinade	Dope Lemon	Australia	2016	62
190	Baby Come Back (Like a Version)	Ocean Alley	Australia	2018	16
191	The Hills	The Weeknd	Canada	2015	19
192	Truth Hurts	Lizzo	United States	2017	—
193	Ho Hey	The Lumineers	United States	2012	43
194	See You Again	Tyler, the Creator featuring Kali Uchis	United States	2017	—
195	Edge of Town	Middle Kids	Australia	2016	—
196	What You Know	Two Door Cinema Club	United Kingdom	2010	—
197	Bloodbuzz Ohio	The National	United States	2010	31
198	Act Yr Age	Bluejuice	Australia	2011	20
199	Pittsburgh	The Amity Affliction	Australia	2014	22
200	Young Blood	The Naked and Famous	New Zealand	2010	38

== Statistics ==
=== Artists with multiple entries ===
#	Artist	Tracks
7	Flume (Note: Four times solo (8, 18, 82, 93), once with Chet Faker (69) and two remixes (48, 98))	8, 18, 48, 69, 82, 93, 98
5	Kanye West (Note: Four times as a lead artist (14, 72, 77, 80), once with Jay-Z (24))	14, 24, 72, 77, 80
4	Tame Impala	1, 26, 65, 66
4	Kendrick Lamar	23, 57, 60, 92
3	Arctic Monkeys	3, 42, 73
3	Gang of Youths	6, 19, 52
3	Sticky Fingers	15, 33, 58
3	Hilltop Hoods	20, 36, 67
3	Childish Gambino	27, 28, 90
2	Rüfüs Du Sol	5, 64
2	Angus & Julia Stone	9, 43
2	Matt Corby	10, 87
2	Chet Faker (Note: Once solo (11), once with Flume (69))	11, 69
2	Lorde	16, 61
2	DMA's	21, 41
2	Jay-Z (Note: Once as a co-lead artist (24) and once with Kanye West (72))	24, 72
2	Flight Facilities	25, 39
2	The Wombats	31, 86
2	Frank Ocean	34, 62
2	Disclosure	40, 98
2	Hermitude	48, 63
2	Sia (Note: Once solo (53) and once with Hilltop Hoods (67))	53, 67
2	Bon Iver (Note: Once solo (100) and once with Kanye West (72))	72, 100
2	Ruel	83, 99

=== Countries represented ===
Country	Count
Australia	50
United States	29
United Kingdom	15
New Zealand	3
Sweden	3
France	2
Canada	2
Belgium	1
Germany	1
Netherlands	1
Trinidad and Tobago	1

=== Songs by year ===
Year	Number of songs
2010	9
2011	16
2012	18
2013	13
2014	11
2015	8
2016	10
2017	6
2018	6
2019	3

=== Records ===
- Including remixes and a collaboration, Australian producer Flume had seven tracks voted into the countdown. No artist has achieved more tracks in a Hottest 100 countdown since Dave Grohl's ten in the 2002 list.
- Azealia Banks, Rex Orange County, and Adele marked their first ever appearance in any Hottest 100 countdown.
- Some of these tracks narrowly missed the top 100 in their annual countdowns, including "Innerbloom" (#103 in 2015), "Loving is Easy" (#107 in 2017), and "Rum Rage" (#124 in 2014).
- Nine songs appeared in the countdown that have never appeared previously in a Hottest 100: Rüfüs Du Sol's "Innerbloom", Sticky Fingers' "Rum Rage", Avicii's "Levels", Azealia Banks' "212", Robyn's "Dancing on My Own", J. Cole's "No Role Modelz", Rex Orange County's "Loving Is Easy", Kendrick Lamar's "M.A.A.D City", and Adele's "Rolling in the Deep".
- Twelve songs appeared at a higher position than their initial annual countdown. The biggest jumps were: Kanye West and Jay-Z's "Niggas in Paris" (up 74 places from #98 in 2011 to #24); and Sticky Fingers' "Australia Street" (up 55 places from No. 70 in 2013 to #15).
- Considering the annual Hottest 100 countdowns between 2010 and 2019, all songs that hit No. 1 in this period made it into the Hottest 100 of the Decade, while two out of the ten songs that formerly reached No. 2 narrowly missed out: Little Red's "Rock It" (#113) from 2010, and Flume's "Rushing Back" (#152) from 2019.
- With some earlier all-time Hottest 100s drawing criticism for being male-dominated (particularly 2009, which featured only two songs with female lead vocalists and 8 with female band members), the Hottest 100 of the Decade demonstrated greater gender equality, featuring 13 songs by solo or lead female vocalists (Lorde, Lana Del Rey, Florence and The Machine, Amy Shark, Sia, Azealia Banks, Billie Eilish, Robyn, Mallrat, Ruby Fields, The Preatures, and Adele), 14 songs with featured female vocalists (Kimbra, Kai, Christine Hoberg, Nicole Millar, Montaigne, Giselle Rosselli, Sirah, Mataya, Sia, Nicki Minaj, Kelly Price, Jezzabell Doran, Amber Coffman and Eliza Doolittle), three with female co-vocalists (Of Monsters And Men, Grouplove, and San Cisco), two with uncredited female vocals (Avicii's "Levels" and Adrian Lux's "Teenage Crime") and three songs with female band members (Angus and Julia Stone and Ball Park Music). The countdown also featured three songs by non-binary gender vocalists (Sam Smith, Tash Sultana, and Cub Sport's Tim Nelson).
