= Back Back Forward Punch =

Australian musical group

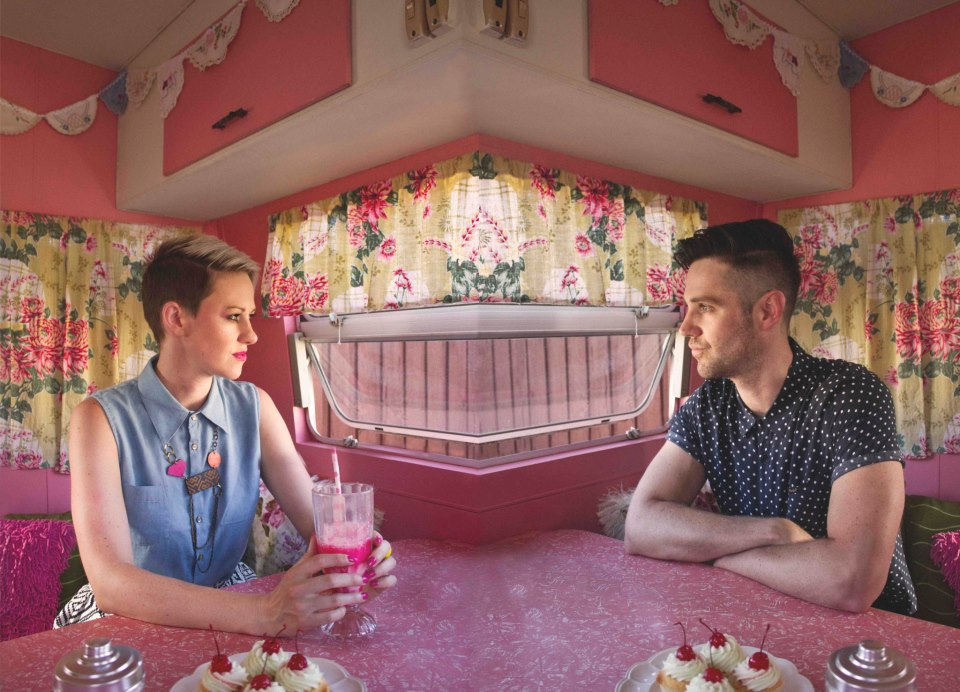
- L to R: Laura Boland, Andy Liddell

Background information
- Origin: Melbourne, Victoria, Australia
- Genres: Electro; disco
- Years active: 2010–current
- Labels: Mammal
- Members: Laura Boland; Andy Liddell
- Past members: John Walsh
- Website: backbackforwardpunch.com.au

Back Back Forward Punch or BBFP are an electronic duo that formed in 2010 as a trio with Laura Boland on lead vocals, Andy Liddell on keyboards and production, and John Walsh on production. Walsh had left by February 2013. The group plays "disco beats and strong, sassy vocals", in the style of Goldfrapp, Groove Armada and Crazy P.

== History ==
Back Back Forward Punch formed in 2010 as an electronic trio with Laura Boland on lead vocals, Andy Liddell on keyboards and production, and John Walsh on production. The three future members had started collaborating in Newcastle in late 2006. At that time Boland was "singing Jamiroquai and Beyonce in a covers band" while Liddell was a "bedroom" producer. They relocated to Melbourne, where they formed the trio which, according to the group, "tend to sway back and forth between velvety nu-disco and quirky electro."

In May 2010 they issued an extended play, Punching Air in the Nyah. One of its tracks, "What Do We Do?", appeared on the various artists mixtape album, Friday MixTape #65, in October 2011. Their debut single, "Red Boots", was issued in January 2012 with an associated music video, which was directed by Stuart Liddell. Their next single, "On the Run", appeared as a music download in mid-year, which AuspOp's website's writer described as "super-tasty" and "super-strong, super-charged, high-energy dance/pop number that points to very exciting things to come."

By February 2013 Walsh had left and Back Back Forward Punch continued as the duo of Boland and Liddell. They issued "Zero to Disco", which the AdamNotEve reviewer indicated "By the time the vocals are introduced it’s hard not to find yourself grooving along to the mesmerizing melody, and by the chorus it becomes almost impossible not to dance" and that "[they] are destined for big things and are definitely a duo to watch out for". A music blog, Indieshuffle, exclaimed that the single delivered "dance floor euphoria" where "Glistening synth waves and sharp percussion lay the platform for Boland's soulful vocals to come to the fore." Stoney Roads' Bary Poppins felt it brought a "very Miami Horror-reminiscent sound to the table, joining Australia's good vibe club."

In July 2013 they released "Don't Stop Now", which was dubbed "essential listening" by Australian music blog WhoTheHell.net. The site likened Boland’s voice to Giselle Rosselli on Flight Facilities’ "Crave You". Moustache Magazine's Anthony Thomas described the group as "Potentially the greatest Australia disco act doing the rounds right now and they have a new clip! If this story is anything to go by, it seems chickens are just as stereotypical as us humans." As a result of receiving national air-play, the single was reviewed by Indieshuffle's Hugh McClure "[it] swings into action quickly and the smooth pace is kept throughout, with Boland's gentle vocals hovering above a fluid, polished bassline. The synth arrangement and sampling slide effortlessly in giving it more of a laid-back, poppy feel – making for a very easy listen", The Vine and Discobelle.

=== 'Emergency Bow Tie' ===
'Emergency Bow Tie' premiered at number 11 on the Triple J Unearthed 'Dance Chart' and received airplay on Dom Alessio's Triple J program "Home & Hosed" as well as Lewis McKirdy's lunch time show. Dom Alessio rated 'Emergency Bow Tie' 4/5 and Lewis McKirdy gave it 5/5 with high praising comments by both presenters. The following week 'Emergency Bow Tie' made it to number 2 on the Triple J Unearthed 'Dance Chart' and number 80 in the overall Triple J Unearthed charts. 'Emergency Bow Tie' has also received high praise from sites all over the globe such as acid stag, Indie Shuffle, THUMP, Too Many Sebastians, Pilerats and Harder Blogger Faster Rolling Stone's Jonny Nail described "Emergency Bow Tie" as "a flash of neon and motherboard mayhem, giving little room for the duo's vocalist, Laura Boland, to carve out her own space."

== Members ==
- Laura Boland – vocals (2010–present)
- Andy Liddell – keyboards (2010–present)
- John Walsh – (2010–?)

== Discography ==
=== Singles ===
- "Red Boots" (January 2012)
- "On the Run" (mid-2012)
- "Zero to Disco" (February 2013)
- "Don't Stop Now" (2013)
- 'Emergency Bow Tie' (2013)
- 'Solid Gold' (2014)
- 'Big Time / Up Late In The Jungle' (2014)
- 'No Answer' (2015)

=== B-sides ===
- "Tipsy" (2013)

=== Extended plays ===
- Punching Air in the Nyah (May 2010)

=== Remixes ===
- Rachel by the Stream: "Call it Love" (2012)
