= AIR Awards of 2013 =

Annual Australian music awards ceremony

- Date: 9 October 2013
- Venue: Revolt Art Space, Melbourne, Australia

Highlights
- Most wins: Flume (4)
- Most nominations: Jagwar Ma (6)
- Website: https://air.org.au/air-awards/

The AIR Awards of 2013 (or Carlton Dry Independent Music Awards of 2013) is the eighth annual Australian Independent Record Labels Association Music Awards (generally known as the AIR Awards) and was an award ceremony at Revolt Art Space, in Melbourne, Australia, on 9 October 2013. The event was sponsored by Australian brewing company, Carlton Dry.

In 2013, the award for Best Independent Classical Album was introduced, as was the Carlton Dry Global Music Grant; a $50,000 cash prize to an emerging independent artist or band in order to provide a major boost to their profile internationally, the finances designed to be used to give the winner a leg up in the international market. In a press release, the AIR said "The Carlton Dry Global Music Grant has been created to ensure that current and future generations of emerging Australian artists have the opportunity to take their music careers abroad. Conditions for entry are that the band or artist must be emerging, Australian, self released or released by an independent label, and that the prize money must be used exclusively to help tour, showcase, record, or relocate overseas to further their careers."

== Performers ==
Perferormers at the ceremony were:

- Violent Soho
- Archie Roach
- Big Scary
- Rüfüs
- Saskwatch
- Seth Sentry

== Nominees and winners ==
Winners are listed first and highlighted in boldface; other final nominees are listed alphabetically.

Best Independent Artist	Best Independent Album
**Flume**; Big Scary; Dick Diver; Jagwar Ma; The Drones	**Flume – Flume** (Future Classic); Big Scary – Not Art (Pieater); Dick Diver – Calendar Daus (Chapter Music); Jagwar Ma – Howlin' (Future Classic); The Drones – I See Seaweed (MGM)
Best Independent Single/EP	Breakthrough Independent Artist of the Year
**Vance Joy – God Loves You When You're Dancing**; Big Scary – "Luck Now"; Courtney Barnett – "History Eraser"; Flume – "Holdin On"; Jagwar Ma – "Man I Need"	**Vance Joy**; Courtney Barnett; Kirin J. Callinan; Seth Sentry; The Rubens
Best Independent Blues and Roots Album	Best Independent Classical Album
**Paul Kelly – Spring and Fall**; Mama Kin – The Magician's Daughter; Mia Dyson – The Moment; Tim Rogers – Rogers Sings Rogerstein; The Cat Empire – Steal The Light	**Amy Dickson – Catch Me if You Can**; Benaud Trio – Bohemian Rhapsody; Melbourne Symphony Orchestra & Nigel Westlake – Missa Solis: Requiem for Eli; Paul Dean and Stephen Emmerson – The Romantic Clarinet; Siobhan Stagg and Amir Farid – Hymne à l'amour
Best Independent Country Album	Best Independent Dance/Electronica Album
**Catherine Britt – Always Never Enough**; Baylou – Go To Hell and I Love You; Karl Broadie – A Side B Side Seaside; The Sunny Cowgirls – What We Do; Lee Kernaghan – Beautiful Noise	**Flume – Flume**; Collarbones – Die Young; Jagwar Ma – Howlin'; ShockOne – Universes; Yolanda Be Cool – Ladies and Mentalman
Best Independent Dance/Electronica or Club Single	Best Independent Hard Rock or Punk Album
**Flume – "Holdin On"**; Charles Murdoch featuring Oscar Key Sung – "Dekire"; Flight Facilities featuring Christine Hoberg – "Clair de Lune"; Jagwar Ma – "Man I Need"; Rüfüs – "Take Me"	**King Gizzard & the Lizard Wizard – 12 Bar Bruise**; Kingswood – Change of Heart; Parkway Drive – Atlas; The Mark of Cain – Songs of the Third and Fifth; The Smith Street Band – Sunshine and Technology
Best Independent Hip Hop/Urban Album	Best Independent Jazz Album
**Seth Sentry – This Was Tomorrow**; Bliss n Eso – Circus in the Sky; Illy – Bring it Back; Spit Syndicate – Sunday Gentlemen; Urthboy – Smokey's Haunt	**Jonathan Zwartz – The Remembering and Forgetting of the Air**; Allan Browne Trio – Lost in the Stars; Christopher Hale – Sylvan Coda; Magnet – Magnet; Trichotomy – Fact Finding Mission
Best Independent Label	Carlton Dry Global Music Grant
**Future Classic**; Liberation Records; Milk! Records; Sweat It Out; Two Bright Lakes	**King Gizzard & the Lizard Wizard**; Big Scary; Jagwar Ma; Mia Dyson; Rüfüs

== See also ==
- Music of Australia
