= Down to Earth (Flight Facilities album) =

Studio album by Flight Facilities
- Released: 24 October 2014
- Genre: Dance; electronic; house; indie pop
- Length: 63:32
- Label: Future Classic
- Producer: Flight Facilities; Eric J Dubowsky; Dennis Dowlut

Flight Facilities chronology
| Down to Earth (2014) | Live with the Melbourne Symphony Orchestra (2015) |

Singles from Down to Earth
- 1. "Crave You" Released: 10 September 2010; 2. "Clair de Lune" Released: 22 October 2012; 3. "Stand Still" Released: 22 November 2013; 4. "Two Bodies" Released: 9 September 2014; 5. "Sunshine" Released: 29 October 2014; 6. "Down to Earth" Released: May 2015; 7. "Heart Attack" Released: 17 July 2015

Down to Earth is the debut studio album by Australian electronic duo Flight Facilities, released on 24 October 2014 by Future Classic.

The album debuted and peaked at number 3 on the ARIA Albums Chart in November 2014.

At the ARIA Music Awards of 2014, the album was nominated for Album of the Year, Best Dance Release and Best Cover Art.

At the J Awards of 2014, the album was nominated for Australian Album of the Year.

Of the group's six singles released prior to the album, three were omitted from the album—"Foreign Language", "With You" and "I Didn't Believe". All three were later recorded live for Live with the Melbourne Symphony Orchestra (2015).

By the end of 2015, the album was certified Gold for sales of more than 35,000 units.

"Stand Still" was remixed by Australian future bass producer Wave Racer.

== Release and promotion ==
On 24 August 2014, Flight Facilities uploaded a video to YouTube to promote the release of their album and upcoming tour dates. The video premiered the album artwork and listed all the featured artists.

Shortly afterwards, Flight Facilities' website was updated for album pre-orders, which included the First Class Experience containing branded eye mask, inflatable pillow, toothbrush, socks and ear plugs. On 9 September 2014, the video for "Two Bodies" featuring Emma Louise was released.

In the days leading up to the album release, previews of the album had been released to the media with no explanation as to who was the guest vocalist on a reprise of their first ever single from 2010, "Crave You", co-written by Giselle Rosselli. On October 16, triple j suggested it may be Kylie Minogue, but Flight Facilities refused to confirm, saying "I think that everyone will find out who it is collectively pretty soon but it's a secret that we definitely want to be kept just for [now]. It's something that we're really excited about but we didn't want to be a gimmick."

That same day, Flight Facilities uploaded a video of Kylie Minogue performing an a cappella cover of "Crave You", wearing an oversized T-shirt while standing on a mattress in a loft apartment, confirming her appearance.

The duo said "the initial idea was to maybe put (Kylie) on the whole of 'Crave You' – to do it again. But we actually felt [that] keeping the original [version] on is part of keeping our original story mixed with the new."

The album was released 24 October 2014, debuting at number 3 on the ARIA Albums Chart.

== Track listing ==
Down to Earth track listing
| No. | Title | Writer(s) | Producer(s) | Length |
|---|---|---|---|---|
| 1. | "Intro" | Hugo Gruzman; James Lyell | Gruzman; Lyell | 1:50 |
| 2. | "Two Bodies" (featuring Emma Louise) | Gruzman; Lyell; Emma Louise | Gruzman; Lyell | 6:08 |
| 3. | "Sunshine" (featuring Reggie Watts) | Gruzman; Lyell; Reginald Watts | Gruzman; Lyell; Eric J; Dennis Dowlut | 4:25 |
| 4. | "Waking Bliss" | Gruzman; Lyell | Gruzman; Lyell | 4:00 |
| 5. | "Stand Still" (featuring Micky Green) | Gruzman; Lyell; Michaela Gehrmann | Gruzman; Lyell | 4:19 |
| 6. | "Apollo" | Gruzman; Lyell; FOD; Katie Noonan | Gruzman; Lyell | 3:51 |
| 7. | "Clair de Lune" (featuring Christine Hoberg) | Gruzman; Lyell; Christine Hoberg | Gruzman; Lyell | 7:39 |
| 8. | "Hold Me Down" (featuring Stee Downes) | Gruzman; Lyell; Stee Downes | Gruzman; Lyell; Eric J; Dowlut | 4:43 |
| 9. | "Heart Attack" (featuring Owl Eyes) | Gruzman; Lyell; Julian Hamilton | Gruzman; Lyell; Eric J | 6:28 |
| 10. | "Merimbula" | Gruzman; Lyell | Gruzman; Lyell | 6:27 |
| 11. | "Why Do You Feel" (featuring Bishop Nehru) | Gruzman; Lyell; Bishop Nehru | Gruzman; Lyell | 4:06 |
| 12. | "Down to Earth" | Gruzman; Lyell | Gruzman; Lyell | 4:30 |
| 13. | "Crave You (Reprise)" (featuring Kylie Minogue) | Gruzman; Lyell; Giselle Rosselli | Gruzman; Lyell | 1:12 |
| 14. | "Crave You" (featuring Giselle Rosselli) | Gruzman; Lyell; Giselle Rosselli | Gruzman; Lyell | 3:54 |
| Total length: | | | | 63:32 |

== Personnel ==
=== Musicians ===
Flight Facilities

- Hugo Gruzman – writing, production (1–14)
- James Lyell – writing, production (1–14)

Other musicians

- Andrew Johnson – monologue (1)
- Michael Di Francesco – bass guitar (3, 8)
- Owl Eyes – vocals (4)
- Katie Noonan – vocals (6)
- Nick Broadhurst – saxophone (8, 14)
- Eric J Dubowsky – guitar (9)
- Dennis Dowlut – vocals (12)

=== Technical ===
- James David – mixing (5)

=== Artwork ===
- Timothy Lovett – artwork

== Charts ==
Chart performance for Down to Earth
| Chart (2014) | Peak position |
|---|---|
| Australian Albums (ARIA) | 3 |
| US Heatseekers Albums (Billboard) | 7 |
| US Top Dance/Electronic Albums (Billboard) | 6 |

== Certifications ==
Certifications for Down to Earth
| Region | Certification | Certified units/sales |
|---|---|---|
| Australia (ARIA) | Gold | 35,000^{^} |
^{^} Shipments figures based on certification alone.
