= Sara Diamond (singer) =

Canadian singer

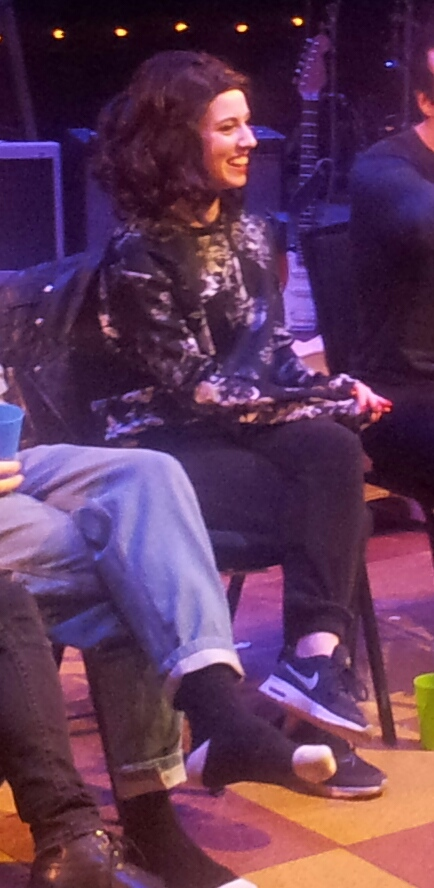
Sara Diamond photographed in Montréal, Québec, Canada at the Segal Centre.

Sara Maxine Diamond (born January 5, 1995) is a Canadian singer from Montreal, Quebec. She is best known for her singing of the American National Anthem for the Montreal Canadiens during the 2013/14 and 2014/15 NHL Playoffs.

== Career ==
Sara started her career in 2000 (age 5) when she sang for children's record label The Kiboomers. In 2008, she released her self-titled debut album under Vatikan Records. During that time, she performed at various events, including ONE X ONE and Future Electronics' Christmas party, opening for Roberta Flack.

In 2009, she auditioned and became the new member of the Clique Girlz, a girl group signed to Interscope Records under Jimmy Iovine. The group split up in April 2009.

In 2013, Sara started singing for the Montreal Canadiens, performing the American and Canadian National Anthems during the 2013 season, then going on to sing the American National Anthem during the 2014 and 2015 NHL Playoffs alongside Ginette Reno.

On March 14, 2016, Sara released her first single, "Just Give In". The song premiered on music blog Noisey, which helped garner a buzz and lead to multiple other blog mentions and writeups. Pop production duo Noah Barer & Cavewerk (JUS POP) produced the track and released it through their SoundCloud page.

On November 11, 2016, Adventure Club released their single "Firestorm", featuring Sara. It is the lead single off their debut album, Red // Blue, which was released on December 2, 2016.

== Discography ==
=== EPs ===
- Foreword (Cyor Sound, 2018)
- IDK (Cyor Sound, 2020)
- SaraX (Cyor Sound, 2022)

== Awards and nominations ==
Year	Award	Category	Nominee(s)	Result	Ref.
2025	Grammy Awards	Best R&B Song	"Here We Go (Uh Oh)" (Coco Jones)	Pending	
