= George Maple =

Australian musical artist (born 1989)

- Born: 25 May 1989 (age 37); Sydney, Australia
- Origin: Los Angeles, California, U.S.
- Genres: Pop, electronic, R&B, soul
- Years active: 2012–present
- Label: Virgin Records/EMI (Past: Future Classic)
- Website: metamorph-george-maple.com

George Maple, is an Australian-born recording artist, songwriter and record producer.

As an artist, ghostwriter and producer, she has over 1.4 billion " streams. She has written and produced for artists including DJ Snake, What So Not, Flume, Jessica Mauboy Tkay Maidza, Goldroom, Guy Sebastian, Hayden James, Anna Lunoe, Melanie C and Flight Facilities. Maple is the pitched down voice on the Hayden James song "Something About You" and 'Just A Lover.' Notable contributions include What So Not 'High You Are,' Flight Facilities 'Foreign Language,' DJ Snake 'Talk,' and What So Not 'Gemini.'

Maple received an ARIA nomination for 'Something About You,' in 2015 and in 2022 Maple was nominated for APRA Most Performed Pop Work with 'Glow' performed by Jessica Mauboy.

Maple has performed at festivals including Coachella, Lollapalooza and EDC Vegas, Field Day, Splendour in the Grass, Groovin the Moo and FOMO festival. She has supported New Zealand singer Lorde, Swedish band Little Dragon and American rapper 6lack. In 2017, Maple released her own debut album, Lover which debuted at #2 on the Australian iTunes Chart. Lover featured US rapper GoldLink and Rome Fortune. Maple wrote, directed and performed several conceptual live performances including Lover and Utopia to accompany her releases as well as creative directed assets for the release. Maple has been featured in many publications including Vogue, Harpers Bazaar ELLE, Interview Magazine, Schon! Magazine and Wonderland.

Maple released her second LP MYTH in 2020 which was accompanied by a self-directed, written and produced live performance film, screened in the Joan Sutherland Theatre the Sydney Opera House. The performance film MYTH, won 2 Australian Cinematography Society awards.

In 2021 Maple moved away from the traditional music landscape to explore new mediums across film, live performance and technology. In 2021 Maple performed at the Cartier High Jewelry Event and in 2022 built 'Time,' a conceptual live performance to celebrate the launch of Dom Pérignon's P2 champagne. She also performed for the Australian Women's Film Festival in collaboration with Cartier and on the runway for Australian Fashion Week. In 2025, Maple performed a private bespoke dinner for Cartier at Melbourne's Attica.

In 2026, Maple designed and executed a bespoke performance and original music for Diptique and Australian cosmetics store Mecca. Maple privately released the 9 minute piece of music 'Metamorph' and performed the piece of music to limited capacity audiences in Sydney, Melbourne, Adelaide and London.

== Discography ==
=== Albums ===
Title	Details
Lover	Released: 27 October 2017; Label: Virgin/EMI
Myth	Released: 11 December 2020; Label: Etcetc

=== Extended plays ===
Title	Details
Vacant Space	Released: 3 October 2014; Label: Future Classic

=== Singles ===
Title	Year	Album	Label
"Talk Talk"	2014	Vacant Space	Future Classic
"Where You End And I Begin" (featuring Grande Marshall)	2015	Lover	Future Classic
"Sticks and Horses" (featuring GoldLink)	2016	Lover	Virgin/EMI
"Buried" (featuring Rome Fortune; with What So Not)	2016	Lover	Virgin/EMI
"Lover"	2017	Lover	Virgin/EMI
"Kryptonite"	2017	Lover	Virgin/EMI
"Hero"	2017	Lover	Virgin/EMI
"Magic Woman"	2019	Non-album singles	Etcetc
"Superhuman"	2019	Non-album singles	Etcetc
"Fade"	2020	Myth	Etcetc
"The Hill"	2020	Myth	Etcetc

=== Appearances and credits ===
Title	Year	Artist	Album	Credits	Label
"Foreign Language"	2011	Flight Facilities	Non-album single	Vocals (as Jess)	Future Classic
"Frozen"	2012	YesYou	YesYou	Vocals, writer (uncredited)	Bossy Music
"Bring You Down"	2012	Flume	Flume	Vocals, writer	Future Classic
"To Be Alone feat. Omar"	2014	Yolanda Be Cool"	Ladies & Mentalmen	writer	Sweat It Out!
"On & On"	2013	Snakehips	Non-album single	Vocals, co-writer	Hoffman West
"Rescue"	2013	Deetron	Music Over Matter	Vocals, co-writer	Music Man Records
"Embrace feat. Ariela Jacobs"	2013	Goldroom	Embrace EP	Writer	independent
"Sonnet"	2014	Slime	In the Brick House Mixtape	Vocals, co-writer	independent
"High You Are" ( Branches Remix)	2014	What So Not	The Quack EP	Writer	Sweat It Out!
"No Time"	2014	Hayden James		Vocals, writer	Future Classic
"Hot Dog"	2015	Slime	Company	Vocals, co-writer(uncredited)	Weird World Records
"Gemini"	2015	What So Not	Gemini EP	Vocals, writer	Owsla / Sweat It Out!
"Can't Get Enough"	2015	Basenji	Trackpad EP	Vocals(uncredited) co-writer	Future Classic
"Arrows feat. Dawn Golden"	2015	What So Not	Gemini EP	co-writer	Owsla / Sweat It Out!
"Air"	2015	Basenji	Trackpad EP	Vocals(uncredited) co-writer	Future Classic
"Something About You"	2015	Hayden James	Non-album single	Vocals (uncredited)	Future Classic
"Talk	2015	DJ Snake	Encore	Vocals, co-writer	Interscope
"Ghost"	2015	Tkay Maidza	Non-album single	Co-writer, co-producer	Dew Process / Universal Music Australia
"Skyline"	2015	Karma Fields	Non-album single	Vocals (uncredited) Writer	Monstercat
"Just a Lover"	2016	Hayden James	Non-album single	Vocals (uncredited) co-writer	Future Classic
"Trust"	2016	What So Not	Divide & Conquer	Vocals (uncredited) Writer	Sweat It Out!
"Buried"	2016	What So Not and George Maple	Divide & Conquer	Vocals, co-writer	Sweat It Out!
"Real Thing"	2017	Bondax		Writer	Recur Records
"Lone"	2016	What So Not	Divide & Conquer	Co-writer	Sweat It Out!
"Feel It"	2016	What So Not	Divide & Conquer	Co-writer, vocals ( uncredited)	Sweat It Out!
"Embrace"	2016	Goldroom		Co-writer, vocals	Downtown
"Afterglow"	2016	Tkay Maidza	Tkay	Co-writer, co-producer	Dew Process / Universal Music Australia
"Simulation"	2016	Tkay Maidza	Tkay	Co-writer, co-producer	Dew Process / Universal Music Australia
"Follow Me"	2016	Tkay Maidza	Tkay	Co-writer, co-producer	Dew Process / Universal Music Australia
"We Keep on Running"	2018	What So Not & Toto	Not All the Beautiful Things / Old Is New	Co-writer	Sweat It Out! / Counter Records
"Altitude"	2021	Flight Facilities	Forever (Flight Facilities album)	Co-writer	Future Classic
"Heartbeat"	2021	French Braids	Phases	Vocals, co-writer	Armada Music
"Glow"	2021	Jessica Mauboy	Non-album single	Co-writer	Warner Music
"Slugger 1.4 2014 Export.WAV	2022	Flume	Non-album single	Co-writer, vocals	Future Classic
"Girl feat. Melanie C"	2025	Anna Lunoe and Melanie C	Pearl	Co-writer	NLV Records
