= Two Bodies =

Single by Flight Facilities featuring Emma Louise

from the album Down to Earth
- Released: 9 September 2014
- Label: Future Classic
- Songwriters: Hugo Gruzman, James Lyell, Emma Louise Lobb
- Producers: Hugo Gruzman, James Lyell

Flight Facilities singles chronology
"Stand Still" (2013)	"Two Bodies" (2014)	"Sunshine" (2014)

Emma Louise singles chronology
"Pontoon" (2013)	"Two Bodies" (2014)	"Underflow" (2015)

Music video
- "Two Bodies" on YouTube

"Two Bodies" is a song released by the Australian DJ duo Flight Facilities, written by singer-songwriter Emma Louise and producers Hugo Gruzman and James Lyell. The song was released in September 2014 as the fourth single from the duo's debut studio album, Down to Earth (2014).

Two Bodies premiered on Triple J on 8 September 2014. Flight Facilities', Hugo Gruzman and James Lyell, said the collaboration with Emma Louise had been conceptualised for some time, "We've always wanted to work with her, and we kind of wrote 'Two Bodie's with her in mind. She's an amazing songwriter and vocalist and she killed it. It probably took three days to record and then six months to mix. We're perfectionists."

The song peaked at number 67 on the ARIA charts. The song polled at number 39 in the Triple J Hottest 100, 2014.

A live version is included on the Flight Facilities' 2015 album, Live with the Melbourne Symphony Orchestra

== Reception ==
Lauren Payne from Purple Sneakers said "Light percussion helps open the track with a short voiceover sample creating a very nostalgic effect on the piece before an almost unnoticeable transition leads us right into 'Two Bodies'... Flight Facilities have proved once again that they can craft a totally amazing composition and Emma Louise gives 'Two Bodies' a life that is thoroughly enjoyed."

== Track listings ==
Digital Download

1. "Two Bodies" (album version) – 6:08

Digital Download

1. "Two Bodies" (Extended version) – 7:33
2. "Two Bodies" (Radio edit) – 4:23
3. "Two Bodies" (Lido Remix) – 2:58
4. "Two Bodies" (Robag Wruhme Endara Wassby Remix) – 6:24
5. "Two Bodies" (HNNY Remix) – 6:30

Digital Download

1. "Two Bodies" (Karma Kid Remix) – 5:10

== Charts ==
Weekly chart performance for "Two Bodies"
Chart (2014)	Peak position
Australia (ARIA Charts)	67
