= Your Smith =

American singer-songwriter

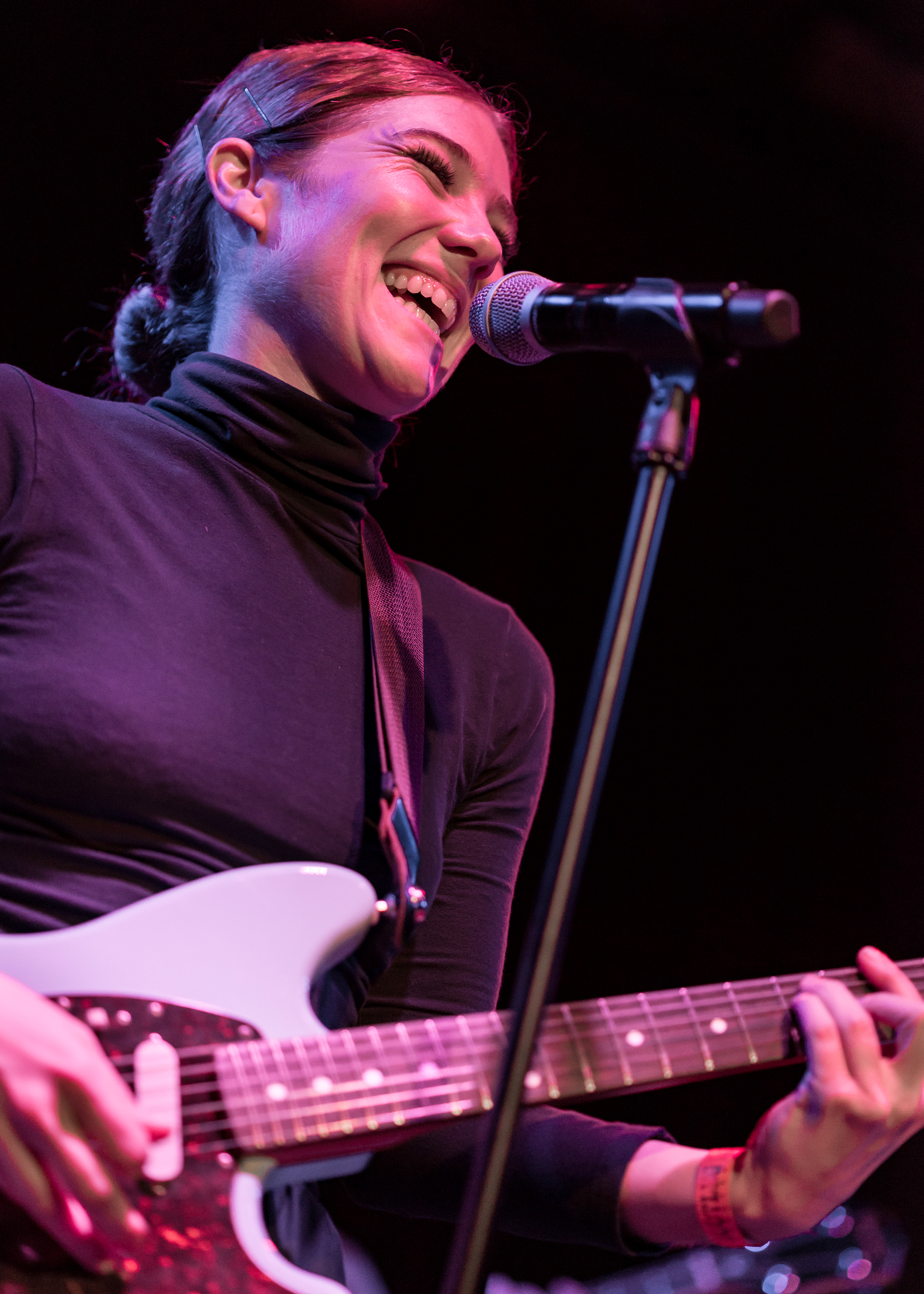
- Smith in 2017

Background information
- Born: Caroline Smith; April 27, 1988 (age 38); Detroit Lakes, Minnesota
- Genres: Folk; pop; indie; neo-soul
- Occupations: Singer; songwriter; restaurant owner
- Years active: 2006-present
- Labels: Neon Gold Records; Nettwerk Music Group
- Formerly of: Caroline Smith and the Good Night Sleeps

Caroline To (née Smith; born April 27, 1988) is an American singer and songwriter. She fronted the indie folk band Caroline Smith and the Good Night Sleeps and since 2018 has performed as Your Smith.

== Early life ==
Caroline Smith was born on April 27, 1988 and grew up in the town of Detroit Lakes in northwest Minnesota. When Smith was eight or nine years old, her father began to teach her acoustic guitar. At 16, she started performing publicly at several Zorbaz Pizza locations in Detroit Lakes and statewide and opened for B. B. King at appearances in Duluth and Rochester. While in her senior year at Detroit Lakes High School in 2006, Smith released a seven-track self-titled album.

In 2006, at 18 she moved to Minneapolis to study at the University of Minnesota. She quickly began a weekly solo gig at Minneapolis' West Bank 400 Bar, a venue famous for acts such as Elliott Smith, Conor Oberst and Mason Jennings. In 2007, the club's owner, Tom Sullivan, introduced her to drummer Arlen Peiffer who is known for his work in the band Cloud Cult. A year later, bassist Jesse Schuster joined the band. Then in March 2011, Caroline joined forces with multi-instrumentalist Alex Ramsey expanding into the Good Night Sleeps.

== Career ==
=== 2006-2013: Caroline Smith and the Good Night Sleeps ===
Caroline Smith and the Good Night Sleeps
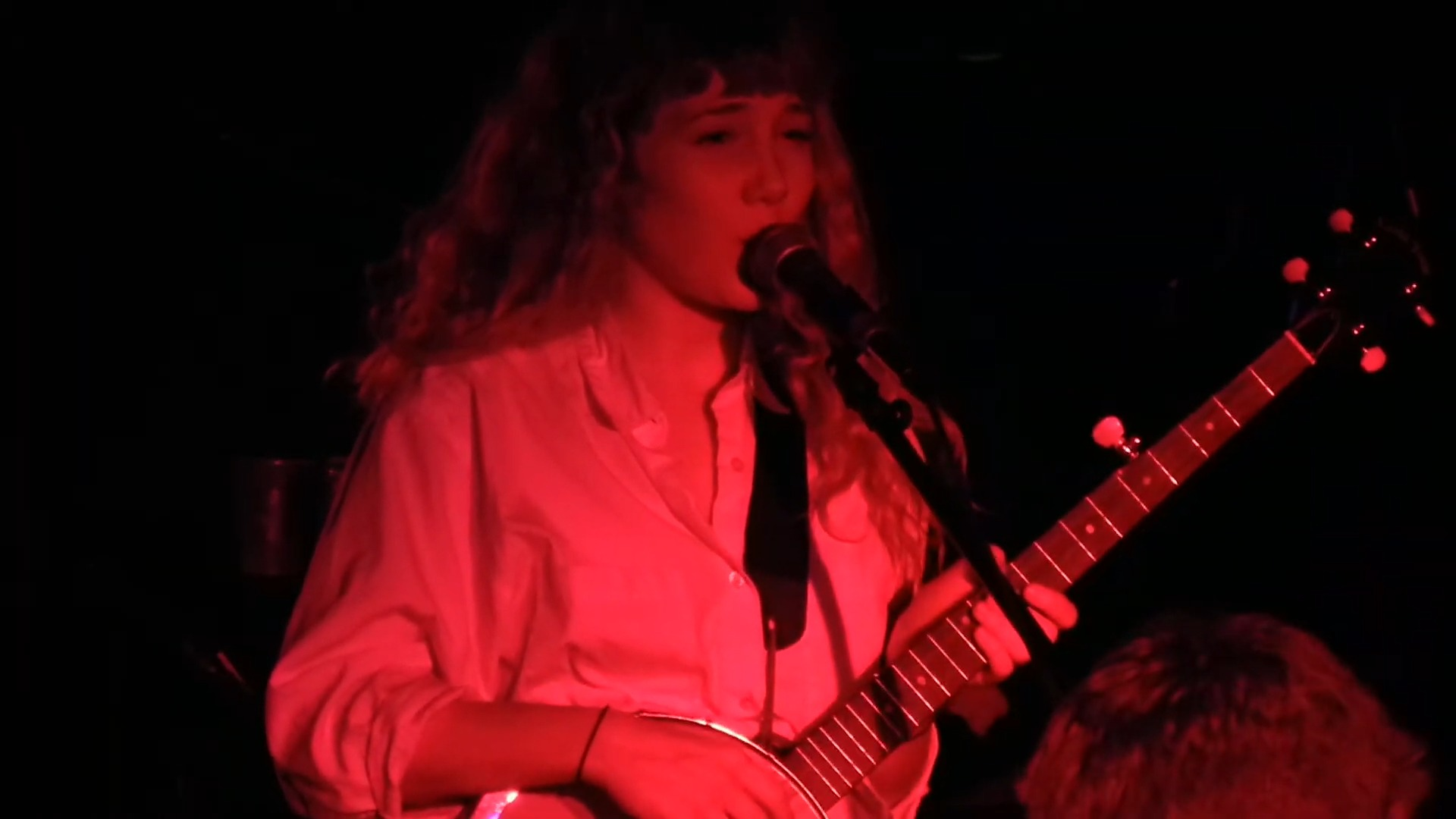
- Smith performing with the Good Night Sleeps in 2012

Background information
- Origin: Minneapolis
- Genres: Folk, pop, indie
- Years active: 2006-2013
- Label: United Interests
- Members: Caroline Smith; Jesse Schuster; Arlen Peiffer; David Earl
- Past members: Alex Ramsey

In August 2008, the band released their debut full-length album Backyard Tent Set. The album was recorded at Devil's Workshop in Minneapolis with Chad Weis (Mason Jennings, Ben Kweller). The sound is described by Smith as "storybook folk with an indie twist. We think it's important that our recording sounds like our live show." The band has toured twice in support of the album, playing as many dates as possible including an open mic at the Shadow Lounge in Pittsburgh.

In 2010, Smith and bandmate Jesse Schuster released Live at the Cedar, recorded exclusively during a show at the Cedar Cultural Center. The album included several songs from Backyard Tentset as well as five additions. The albums were hand packaged and fitted with an envelope, string and a wax stamp and sold out within 6 months.

The band completed seven national tours and has played at venues including Minneapolis' notable First Avenue. Smith described the experience of selling out the hometown venue: "When I was in high school, I used to sit in my bathroom and sing with my guitar and pretend I was on the main stage of First Avenue...I was totally transported back to that moment as soon as I started playing and I got all giddy."

On March 6, 2011, Minnesota Public Radio station 89.3 The Current premiered a new song from the band on The Local Show entitled "Tank Top." Previously, Smith, along with bandmate Jesse Schuster, performed "She Ain't Got it," "Lack of Height," "Denim Boy" and "Tying My Shoes" in the 89.3 The Current studios which was filmed on February 2, 2010.

The band recorded their last album to date, Little Wind, at the Terrarium in Minneapolis with Jason Orris (Polara, Happy Apple, Haley Bonar). The record, mixed by Tom Herbers (Low, Dark Dark Dark, Andrew Bird), was released on September 20, 2011. She describes the new record as an "evolving more rocking sound still with folk elements and roots, We like to say post folk."

=== 2013-2018: Caroline Smith ===
Half About Being A Woman, released as a solo album, had a more neo-soul feel and drew influences from artists of "the 90’s neo-soul explosion" such as Erykah Badu, Jill Scott and D’Angelo. She spoke about it at the time, saying "I’m glad we gave ourselves a chance to write the music we really love."

In 2014, Smith release a single with Lizzo called "Let 'em Say". In 2018, she featured on the track "23" from Rejjie Snow's album Dear Annie.

=== 2018-present: Your Smith ===
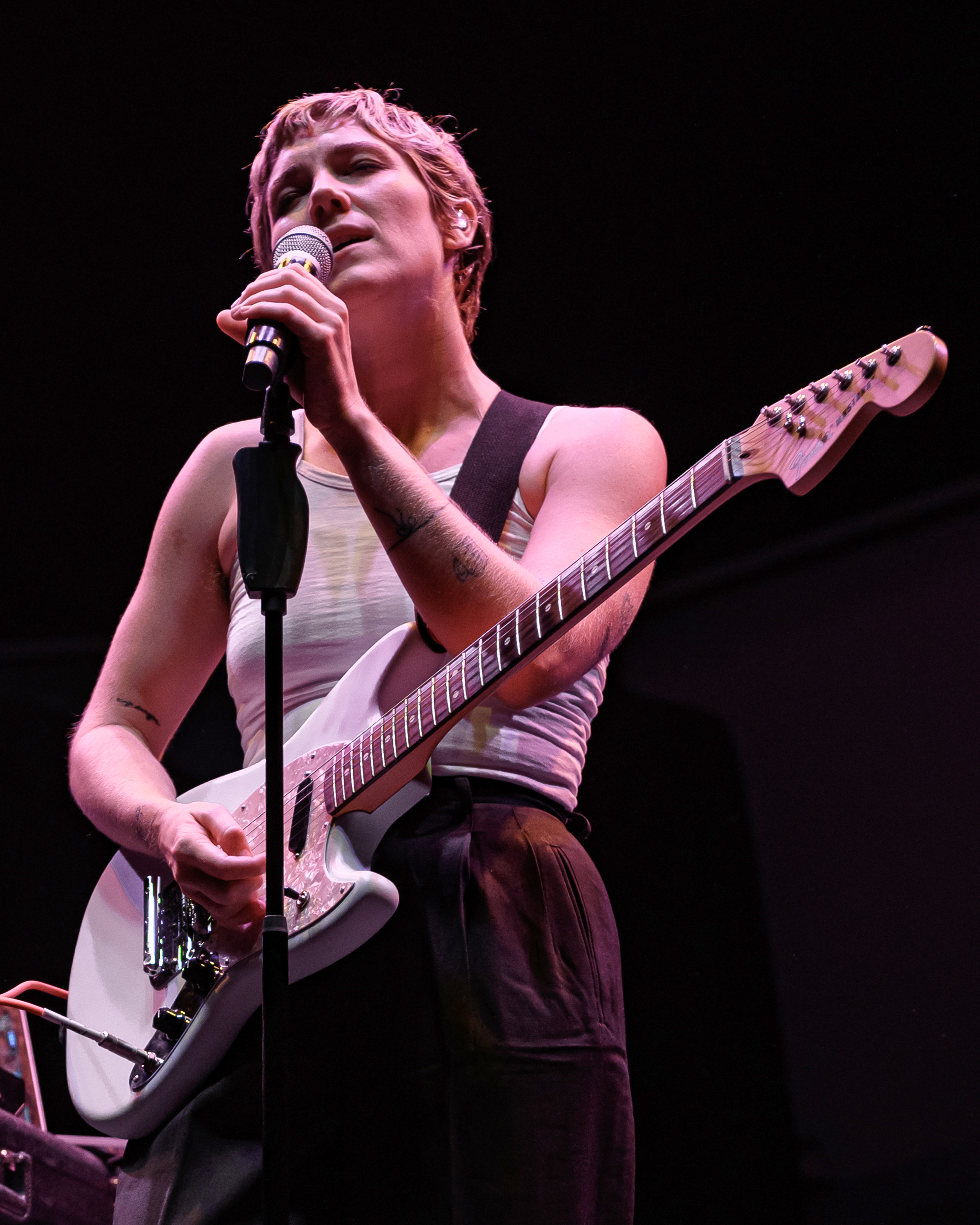
Smith performing in 2019

In 2018, after moving to Los Angeles, Caroline Smith signed to Neon Gold Records under the name Your Smith and released the EP Bad Habit. The following year she released the EP Wild Wild Woman and embarked on a tour.

In November 2021, Your Smith was featured on the single "Heavy" by Australian electronic duo Flight Facilities.

Smith released The Rub, her first album as Your Smith, on September 12, 2025.

== Discography ==
=== Albums ===
As Caroline Smith

- Caroline Smith (2006)
- Half About Being a Woman (October 8, 2013)

As Caroline Smith and the Good Night Sleeps

- Backyard Tent Set (August 19, 2008)
- Live at the Cedar (Caroline Smith Feat. Jesse Schuster) (January 28, 2010)
- Little Wind (September 20, 2011)

As Your Smith

- The Rub (September 12, 2025)

=== EPs ===
As Your Smith

- Bad Habit (July 27, 2018)
- Wild Wild Woman (June 14, 2019)
