= Drama (American duo) =

American musical duo

- Origin: Chicago, Illinois, U.S.
- Genres: R&B, dance
- Years active: 2013–present
- Members: Na'el Shehade; Via Rosa
- Website: thedramaduo.com

Drama (stylized as DRAMA) is an American duo from Chicago consisting of producer Na'el Shehade and vocalist/songwriter Via Rosa (born Lluvia Rosa Vela). Often described as a blend of R&B and dance, their music spans a wide variety of genres including pop, hip hop, jazz, bossa nova, and electronic. The band is known for their independent approach to creating and releasing their music. Their debut album Dance Without Me was released in February 2020.

== History ==
=== Origins and formation ===
==== Via Rosa ====
Born in Austin, Texas and raised on an Indian reservation in northern California, Rosa grew up touring with her parents who played in a reggae band. Rosa developed an interest in poetry while attending charter school, which she began combining with beats she wrote in her late teenage years. After attending a culinary school in Hollywood, Rosa moved to Chicago in 2010 to be with her grandmother who was battling cancer. There, she joined hip hop collective THEMPeople and released her own musical projects between 2010 and 2014.

==== Nael Shehade ====
Shehade, who was born and raised in Chicago, spent his teenage years DJing at clothing shops and record stores, and enjoying the city's house and electronic music scenes. He began making his own music in high school (which led to Bravo and MTV licensing his music), and although he eventually attended business school to study arts management, he ultimately began collaborating with other artists as a producer. Before forming Drama, Shehade worked on projects with Chance The Rapper (Acid Rap), Kanye West (G.O.O.D. Music's Cruel Summer compilation), Chief Keef, and Vic Mensa among others. Shehade was encouraged to start releasing his own music by artist Nicolas Jaar.

==== Formation of the duo ====
Before meeting in 2013, Shehade and Rosa had individual careers in the music industry. The duo were introduced by vocalist Jean Deaux, who at the time was collaborating with Shehade and was a friend of Rosa. Originally the project was informal, but eventually solidified into a fully formed duo with Shehade producing and writing and Rosa singing and writing.

=== 2015–2017: Gallows EP ===
In September 2015, Drama released their debut single "Hopes Up". The song was one of the first they wrote, later accompanied by a video in January 2016 directed by fellow Chicago native Christopher Kostrzak. Following the release of an additional single "Forever's Gone" in May accompanied by a video directed by Chris Yoder, the duo released their debut Gallows EP in November 2016. Named for gallows humor, the release reflects on painful experiences with levity. Throughout 2017, Drama wrote and recorded remixes for the Gallows Remixes EP, as well as music for their upcoming Lies After Love EP. In March, the band opened for Sofi Tukker in Chicago. In the following months, they took stage in Los Angeles, San Francisco, and New York City. In November, the duo opened for Jungle at Red Bull Sound Select at Metro Chicago. The band would later release a collection of remixes from the EP in January 2018.

=== 2018: Lies After Love EP ===
Leading with the release of "Majid" in April 2018, the duo independently released their sophomore EP Lies After Love to stream through Hypebeast the following month. The EP's title summarizes the lyrical content of its songs, which are about "affirmations and lies one tells themselves to get over a heartbreak" as Rosa explained. The band supported the release with a series of U.S. tour dates on the US West Coast, which included a performance at Mamby on the Beach festival in June, followed by the Middle East and Europe in the fall. The duo released the single "Ready for Love" in October 2018. The band also toured with French artist Jain in fall 2018 as support on his North American tour, which included sold out shows in Chicago, Los Angeles, and New York City. Drama ended the year with a tour that included shows in Boston and the East Coast, with a final performance at Lincoln Hall in Chicago.

=== 2019: Ghostly International ===
Drama released the single "Dead and Gone" in January 2019. The band completed their own 15-date North American headline tour in February 2019. In June, they released the single "Give No Fucks".

That year, Drama embarked on a tour that included over 20 performances, including a sold-out show at The Echo in Los Angeles and a series of shows at South by Southwest (SXSW) in April.

Drama signed with independent label Ghostly International in September. Shortly after, they performed at a showcase at Metro Chicago for the label's 20th anniversary. The band released their first pre-album single "Hold On" with the label that month followed by a tour with SG Lewis later that fall. In November, they followed up with "Gimme Gimme," and on December 5, they released "Nine One One."

In November, following the releases of "Hold On" and "Gimme Gimme", Drama announced their debut album Dance Without Me as well as their 2020 North American, UK, and European headline tour dates slated to begin in February 2020, with sold out shows set for cities such as Los Angeles, Portland, Toronto, Boston, Chicago, Houston, and others. Before releasing the album, the band released "Years" in January 2020 with a video directed by Adam Chitayat. The latter track was named "Today's Top Tune" by LA radio station KCRW in February.

=== 2020: Dance Without Me ===
Drama released Dance Without Me on February 14, 2020 via Ghostly International. The album, hailed as a "powerful ode to heartbreak and the metamorphosis that comes from the spiritual journey to total self-love and acceptance" continues exploring the themes of love and loss that have pervaded the bands career. The band initially embarked on their album promotion by touring various cities in Europe and the U.S., with notable sold-out shows in London, Paris, Hamburg, Berlin, Los Angeles, San Francisco, Brooklyn, and more. Due to the COVID-19 pandemic, some of these tour dates had to be canceled. In response to the pandemic, the group transitioned to livestreamed stay-at-home concerts starting in April 2020. These virtual performances gained traction and continued to be a popular choice, with shows carrying on throughout 2021, often selling out.

In April 2020, Drama teamed up with UK electronic duo Gorgon City to release "Nobody", a single which came to fruition in the studio while Kye Gibbon was spending time in Chicago. The single was accompanied by a video shot in Chicago featuring a street dance interpretation of West Side Story as a tribute to their collaboration. In September, Drama revisited Dance Without Me by releasing a remix EP also released by Ghostly International, featuring Poolside (band), Pional, Rezident, and Moglii. They reteamed with Gorgon City for the 2021 single "You've Done Enough."

=== 2021: Collaborations and return to in-person shows ===
In early January 2021, Drama teamed up with Poolside to release the dancefloor single "I Feel High," which the band described as a song that is "all about that invincible feeling you get when you’re young, and out with your friends." Poolside's Jeffrey Paradise commented "DRAMA took the song, originally embodying Poolside's signature laid-back vibe, and turned it into an energetic club anthem that ultimately celebrates the euphoric and occasionally carefree essence of life."

On January 29, 2021, electronic duo Gorgon City and Drama released the single "You've Done Enough" via Universal Music, which peaked at #70 on the UK Singles Chart for 9 weeks and would go on to earn a BRIT Certified Silver Award in January 2023.

In May 2021, Drama independently released single "Don't Hold Back," along with a visualizer for the song. This marked the band's first pre-album release from their upcoming EP, "Don't Wait Up," which was subsequently launched in early 2022. They explained that the track was about the fear of commitment, and Zane Lowe described it as "heartbreak and bliss". The song was remixed by Tensnake in June. On July 8, Drama released a remix of Brijean's "Hey Boy".

On July 31, 2021, Drama made a highly anticipated post-pandemic appearance and performed at Lollapalooza held in their native Chicago. The band was also part of the "all-star" lineup of the highly anticipated Life Is Beautiful Music & Art Festival held in Las Vegas in September, a lineup which included Billie Eilish, Tame Impala, Glass Animals, and A$AP Rocky. The Blue Man Group made a surprise appearance and joined the band for a special performance during their set. The festival made its comeback after a year off and saw over 180,000 attendees. In October, the group performed at the Outside Lands Night Show at Bimbo's 365 Club in San Francisco leading up to their appearance at the Outside Lands Festival.

In October 2021, Drama teamed up with Australian duo Flight Facilities to release "Move", a single that channeling "the classic sounds of the 1980s Chicago house". That same month, the band released their second solo single of the year, "Dark Rain," which they described as a "song for the people who have found each other." In November, they released the single "First Christmas".

In December 2021, Drama independently released Gallows (Deluxe), a compilation of tracks from Gallows presented on a limited run of vinyl records, along with an accompanying digital release that includes two extra bonus tracks – "Missing" and "Sweet Summer."

=== 2022: Don't Wait Up & tour ===
On February 21, 2022, Drama independently released EP Don’t Wait Up, which follows the instances within a relationship "that keep a person pining, even when it becomes clear the situation is toxic". The track "Hit My Line" was particularly praised, described by Rolling Stone as "seductively danceable" and as "nailing the emotional intricacies of an imbalanced relationship." The EP saw remixes by Emmaculate, James Curd, Robin Hannibal, Vandelux, Terry Hunter, Awsumo, Tensnake, and Disco Demolition.

In November 2022, Drama collaborated with Jamila Woods on a remix of her single "Boundaries". On December 9, Ten City released Drama's remix of their single "Love is Love".

Drama's North American tour spanned late February with shows in Texas and Atlanta, Georgia followed by performances in Nashville, New York City, Cleveland, Tallahassee, and Chicago throughout March. In early March, the band was featured in the lineup of the Okeechobee Music & Arts Festival in Florida. In April, they traveled to Mexico to perform at the Tecate Pa'l Norte Festival held in Monterrey and at the Ceremonia Festival in Mexico City. In May, the band was part of the rosters of the Movement Electronic Music Festival in Detroit, Michigan, and the Summer Camp Music Festival in Chillicothe, Illinois. At the end of the month, they took the stage at Soldier Field in Chicago, opening for Coldplay as part of the British band's Music of the Spheres World Tour. In June, Drama made an appearance at Electric Forest in Rothbury, Michigan. Late July marked their performance at the Hard Summer Music Festival in San Bernardino, kicking off a series of shows throughout California for the remainder of the year, including a highly praised set at Portola Music Festival in San Francisco in late September. In November, they opened for ODESZA during the duo's "Last Goodbye" tour.

=== 2023: TILL WE DIE and Tour ===
In January 2023, Tensnake and Drama collaborated on "Rooftop," featured on Tensnake's album Stimulate. On March 23, the band released the single "Tighten It Up", which reached the 20th position on KCRW's Top 30 Chart.

May saw the release of "Feel The Same". The band also released remixes for "Tighten It Up" and "Feel The Same", along with music videos for both singles.

In July 2023, Drama teamed up with Gorgon City again for the release of the single "Lost & Found", accompanied by a music video featuring Via Rosa. In August, the band released the self-titled single "DRAMA", paired with a music video following three struggling characters from Chicago. The song was lyrically inspired by the band's live performances and the things they witnessed at their shows, and sets a tone that "embodies groovy runway energy", which Rosa's vocals described as "cheeky and hypnotic", and Shehade's production as "tough, playful, and energizing".

In April 2023, Drama performed at several sold-out shows throughout the Pacific Northwest, which included stops in Portland and Seattle and in Vancouver, Canada. They performed a highly anticipated set at Coachella Valley Music and Arts Festival at the end of the month, alongside headliners such as Frank Ocean, Gorillaz, and Bad Bunny. The band also made an appearance at the Do Lab stage. In May, Drama was part of the lineup at the Lightning in a Bottle Festival held in Bakersfield, California. They also performed at WeHo Pride in early June and opened for ODESZA at Summerfest in Milwaukee, Wisconsin later in the month. On July 23, 2023, Drama performed at the Capitol Hill Block Party in Seattle, followed by a sold out show on a new venue opening weekend at The Bellwether in Los Angeles, and in San Francisco. Drama also headlined the DJ set at Northalsted Market Days in August and a club set at Splash House's 10th Anniversary weekend in Palm Springs.

On November 10, DRAMA released the EP TILL WE DIE, which was met with critical acclaim. Forbes described the project as an evolution of the band's sound and praised the caliber of their performance, noting it delivered on both fronts. The EP release was followed by East Coast shows in New York City, Boston, and Washington, D.C. Their November 11 event show at the Knockdown Center in Queens was their largest to date and noted by Nylon as especially energetic.

Following the EP release, DRAMA presented a short film for the single "As I Am." On November 29, they began their TILL WE DIE European tour, which included sold-out shows in London (Brixton), Amsterdam (Bitterzoet), and Copenhagen (Vega), as well as performances in Paris, Berlin, and Brussels.

=== 2024: TIL WE DIE Tour, international appearances, and new collaborations ===
In January 2024, DRAMA announced their TIL WE DIE US tour dates, including a hometown performance at The Salt Shed in Chicago on January 20. The show featured a lineup of fellow Chicago artists, including funk-hip-hop artist Ric Wilson, DJ Terry Hunter, DJ and producer Derrick Carter, and DJ Emmaculate.

In mid-March, the duo confirmed they would join ODESZA on the Last Goodbye Finale Tour and, on March 15, released a collection of TIL WE DIE remixes.

On March 17, DRAMA announced their first Australian tour dates, with performances scheduled in Sydney, Brisbane, and Melbourne. Days later, on March 20, they played at the Treefort Music Fest in Boise, Idaho.

On April 22, the band released the single CHICAGO, featuring DJ Pharris. In early May, the duo embarked on their first "highly anticipated East Coast Australia tour," performing in Sydney, Melbourne, and Brisbane from May 9 to May 11.

On June 5, they premiered a short film for CHICAGO, before joining ODESZA for two back-to-back sold-out shows at BMO Stadium in Los Angeles on June 7 and 8. Later that month, they performed at Electric Forest on June 20 alongside acts including Nelly Furtado, Dom Dolla, and John Summit, followed by two nights with ODESZA at Madison Square Garden in New York City on June 21 and 22.

In early July, DRAMA joined ODESZA, opening for the final three shows of The Last Goodbye tour at The Gorge Amphitheatre, performing for 66,000 fans over the three-day event from July 4 to July 6.

At the end of July, DRAMA played the Stern Grove Music Festival in San Francisco on July 26 and 27, with a pre-show at Public Works. This performance was significant as it was the first time the festival expanded its programming to include an outside venue. This collaboration, described as a "special appearance" and an "unprecedented partnership," marked the first instance of Stern Grove partnering with another venue to produce a paid event.

In August, DRAMA's 2021 track "Dark Rain" from their EP Don’t Wait Up was included in the film It Ends With Us, starring Blake Lively and Justin Baldoni, and was used in the film’s promotions and playlists.

In September, DRAMA headlined the “Kickoff at The Big Top” concert, a special Friday night event at the 2024 Music at the Intersection festival in partnership with St. Louis CITY SC. The concert took place on September 13 at The Big Top in the Grand Center neighborhood of St. Louis. Later in the month, on September 28, the group performed their DJ set at the annual Hoodoo Mural Festival in Amarillo, Texas.

In late October, Drama released the single "Gave You Everything" with Modern Living on October 25. The following night, they performed at Will Ferrell’s Ultimate DJ House Party at Chicago’s Wintrust Arena, benefiting Cancer for College with other acts including Swedish House Mafia, A-Trak, and Felix da housecat. The duo's final live performance of the year took place at the 2024 Formula 1 Grand Prix in Las Vegas with a set at the headlining Sphere Stage with acts including Ludacris Alesso, and Chromeo. November saw additional collaborations, including “Dancing On My Own” with Flight Facilities on November 13, and the “Chicago South Side Remix” with DJ Terry Hunter and DJ Emmaculate on November 22. In December, Drama released a Chicago JUKE MIX with DJ Sluggo on December 8, a holiday single “The Christmas Song (Chestnuts Roasting On An Open Fire)” on December 15, and the “Chicago Northside Remix,” produced by James Curd, on December 22.

=== 2025–2026: Platonic Romance, remixes, and tour ===
In early 2025, DRAMA announced their new management under Renee Brodeur and Ben Collins at TMWRK Management, which also manages artists such as A-Trak and Diplo. On January 14, the duo released CHICAGO (Remixes), followed by a sold-out DJ set at Chicago's Smartbar on January 25, where they introduced DRAMA CLUB, a new series of DJ sets.

In 2025, DRAMA began the rollout for their third studio album, Platonic Romance. The album's title dated back to a 2019 tour with SG Lewis, when Via Rosa said the group used the phrase to describe the close and supportive relationships that developed among members of the touring parties. The title track was released on July 25, 2025, followed by "On The Way" on September 12 and "Savannah" on November 14. On September 26, The Brothers Macklovitch, a project of A-Trak and Dave 1, released a remix of "Dancing On My Own" by Flight Facilities and DRAMA. The On The Way remix EP was released in October. During the year, the duo also performed at Wonderfront, BottleRock Napa Valley, the July 4th Weekender at Chicago's Lakefront Green, Dusk Music Festival, and Simi Fest.

Platonic Romance was released on January 9, 2026. The 13-track album includes "Make It Look Easy", "Oblivion", "Savannah", "Long Night", "On The Way", "Yalla Habibi", and the title track. KEXP described the album as continuing the duo's blend of R&B, pop, and electronic music with house and disco influences, while Double J characterized it as pairing Rosa's vocals and lyricism with Shehade's production. The album reached number one on KCRW's Top 30 chart for the week of January 12–18, 2026. DRAMA later performed songs from the album in a Live on KEXP session recorded on March 4 and released on April 8.

DRAMA supported the album with the Platonic Romance Tour across North America in early 2026, including a January 24 performance at Chicago's The Salt Shed. On April 24, The Brothers Macklovitch released "Lots of Love", a collaboration with DRAMA. The duo performed at the Do LaB stage during the second weekend of the Coachella Valley Music and Arts Festival. "Long Night (DRAMA Edit)" was released on May 22, followed by Platonic Romance (Remixes) on June 12, which featuring remixes by Azzecca, Emmaculate, GUDFELLA, NASAYA, and BeenWell, and others. DRAMA also appeared as a supporting act on some 2026 dates of SOFI TUKKER's Animal Talk tour.

== Musical style ==
Drama's music has been described as "happy sad", characterized by Rosa's poignant lyrics about love and heartbreak designed for healing and catharsis, balanced out by Shehade's production featuring "throbbing synths and R&B." Rosa has cited Sade, Drake, Stevie Nicks, and Kurt Cobain among her lyrical influences, and Billie Holiday and Toni Braxton as vocal influences. Shehade, who was influenced by Chicago house scene growing up, counts Jon Brion and Pharrell among his production influences. As they describe it, the duo's writing process involves Shehade accenting emotions evoked by Rosa's lyrics, which consist of revisiting past experiences to find new perspective.

== Discography ==
=== Albums and EPs ===
- 2016 – Gallows
- 2018 – Lies After Love
- 2020 – Dance Without Me
- 2021 – Gallows (Deluxe)
- 2022 – Don't Wait Up
- 2024 – Chicago
- 2026 - Platonic Romance

=== Singles ===
Year	Title
2018	"Ready for Love"
2018	"Dead and Gone"
2018	"Missing"
2019	"Give No Fucks"
2021	"Sweet Summer"
2021	"First Christmas"
2023	"Dollar $hort" (with Flight Facilities
2024	"Chicago" (with DJ Pharris)

=== As featured artist, remixes ===
Year	Artist	Title
2020	Poolside	"I Feel High"
2021	Gorgon City	"You've Done Enough"
2021	Brijean	"Hey Boy (DRAMA Remix)"
2021	Flight Facilities	"Move"
2022	Jamila Woods	"Boundaries (DRAMA Remix)"
2022	Ten City	"Love is Love (DRAMA Remix)"
2023	Tensnake	"Rooftop"
2023	Gorgon City	"Lost & Found"
