= Brux (musician) =

- Birth name: Elizabeth Maniscalco
- Born: Sydney
- Genres: Electronica
- Occupation(s): record producer, DJ, singer-songwriter
- Instrument: Vocals
- Years active: 2010–present
- Labels: Inertia, Grizzly UK, etcetc, Dim Mak Records

Elizabeth Maniscalco, known by her stage names BRUX and formerly Elizabeth Rose, is an Australian electronica DJ, record producer, and singer-songwriter. As of 2022 she was based in Brooklyn, New York.

== Early life ==
Elizabeth Maniscalco was born in Sydney, Australia.

== Career ==
Elizabeth Rose's first single, "Ready", was released in January 2012 to good reviews.

In October 2013, she toured Australia in support of her debut EP The Good Life.

In 2015, Elizabeth Rose teamed up with Australian Marriage Equality (AME) to release the song "Division", which addresses the issue of marriage equality in Australia. The track was co-produced with Dennis Dowlut. For two weeks following its initial release, all proceeds were donated to AME.

She has also performed at BigSound (2012, 2013), Sydney's Come Together Festival (2015), and Splendour in the Grass (2015). Elizabeth Rose also performed at New York's annual industry showcase CMJ Music Marathon (2013).

In 2016 she released an album, Intra, her last under the name Elizabeth Rose.

In 2018 she started performing under the alias BRUX, "reimagined with a heavier, darker sound". In 2020, BRUX released the EP Fruit. She later self-released the EP Badboi.

As BRUX, she has performed or collaborated with Qrion, Jacques Greene, Boys Noize, and QRTR. As of 2022 she was based in Brooklyn, New York and performing under the name BRUX.

== Accolades ==
Radar Music marked Elizabeth Rose as one of the "20 Aussie Indie Bands to Watch in 2012".

In September 2013, Elizabeth Rose was announced the winner of the Qantas Spirit of Youth Music Award.

In March 2018, Red Bull Music Academy announced BRUX for the 20th-anniversary edition of this event, in which she would join participants from 37 different countries. Her work has been praised by DJ Mag, Billboard, and Mixmag, as well as many artists and labels.

Her 2020 EP Fruit won critical acclaim, and she garnered airplay on Australian national youth radio Triple J.

=== AIR Awards ===
The Australian Independent Record Awards (commonly known informally as AIR Awards) is an annual awards night to recognise, promote and celebrate the success of Australia's Independent Music sector.

Year	Nominee / work	Award	Result
2017	Intra	Best Independent Dance/Electronic Album	Nominated

== Discography ==
=== Studio albums ===
Title	Details
Intra	Released: 4 March 2016; Label: Midnight Feature (MF0317CD); Format: CD, Digital download

=== Extended plays ===
Title	Details
Crystallise	Released: 12 October 2012; Label: Inertia (EROSE004); Format: CD, Digital download
Elizabeth Rose	Released: 17 January 2014; Label: Inertia (EROSE004); Format: CD, Digital download

=== Singles ===
Title	Year	Album
"Never Fear" (Dr Don featuring Elizabeth Rose)	2011	non album single
"Ready"	2012	Crystallise
"Again" featuring Sinden)	2012	Crystallise
"Give In"	2013	Crystallise
"I Didn't Believe" (Flight Facilities featuring Elizabeth Rose)	2013	non album single
"The Good Life"	2014	Elizabeth Rose
"Sensibility"	2014	Elizabeth Rose
"Back and Forth" (The Aston Shuffle featuring Elizabeth Rose)	2014	Photographs
"Intensions"/"Anywhere" (with Frames)	2014	non album single
"Can I Keep U?" (Vinny Luna featuring Elizabeth Rose)	2014	non album single
"Another Earth"	2015	Intra
"Division"	2015	Intra
"Shoulda Coulda Woulda"	2015	Intra
"Playing with Fire" (featuring Remi)	2016	Intra
"In 3s"	2016	Intra
"From the Start" (LO'99 featuring Elizabeth Rose)	2017	non album single
"Wait and See" (Flight Facilities featuring Brux)	2021	Forever
