= Foreign Language (song) =

2011 song by Flight Facilities

Single by Flight Facilities featuring Jess
- Released: August 2011
- Length: 4:04
- Label: Future Classic
- Songwriter(s): Hugo Gruzman, James Lyell, Jess Higgs

Flight Facilities singles chronology
"Crave You" (2010)	"Foreign Language" (2011)	"Feeling" (2011)

Music video
- "Foreign Language" on YouTube

"Foreign Language" is a song written and recorded by Australian electronic music production duo Flight Facilities featuring Jess. It was released in August 2011 and peaked at number 87 on the ARIA Charts.

The song polled at number 72 in the Triple J Hottest 100, 2011.

At the J Awards of 2012, the Dimitri Basil directed video was nominated for Australian Video of the Year.

In 2022, a limited edition vinyl was released, featuring a new remix with Riva Starr.

== Track listings ==
Digital download

1. "Foreign Language" – 4:04

Digital download (remixes)

1. "Foreign Language" (Flight Facilities Extended remix) – 5:59
2. "Foreign Language" (Will Saul & Tam Cooper remix) – 7:12
3. "Foreign Language" (Rocco Raimundo Reinterpretation)– 7:45
4. "Foreign Language" (Drop Out Orchestra remix) – 7:20
5. "Foreign Language" (Beni remix) – 4:19
6. "Foreign Language" (Elizabeth Rose remix) – 5:27
7. "Feelin'" – 6:16
8. "Feelin'" (Johnny Pow! mix) – 5:13

2022 Vinyl

- A1 "Foreign Language" (Flight Facilities Extended remix) – 5:59
- A2 "Feelin'" – 6:16
- B1 "Foreign Language" (Riva Starr Turbo Disco Extended remix)
- B2 "Foreign Language" (Will Saul & Tam Cooper remix) – 7:12

== Charts ==
Weekly chart performance for "Foreign Language"
Chart (2011)	Peak position
Australia (ARIA Charts)	87
