= Clair de Lune (Flight Facilities song) =

2012 song by Flight Facilities

Single by Flight Facilities featuring Christine Hoberg

from the album Down to Earth
- Released: 22 October 2012
- Genre: Electronica, ambient
- Length: 7:43
- Label: Flight Facilities
- Songwriters: Christine Hoberg, Hugo Gruzman, James Lyell
- Producers: Hugo Gruzman, James Lyell

Flight Facilities singles chronology
"Feelin'" (2012)	"Clair de Lune" (2012)	"I Didn't Believe" (2013)

"Clair de Lune" is a song released by the Australian DJ duo Flight Facilities, written by singer-songwriter Christine Hoberg and producers Hugo Gruzman and James Lyell. It features a melodic interpretation of a section of "Clair de Lune" by French composer Claude Debussy. The song was released in October 2012 as the second single from the band's debut studio album, Down to Earth (2014). The song peaked at number 38 on the ARIA charts and was certified gold in 2013. At the APRA Music Awards of 2013, the song was shortlisted for Song of the Year.

At the ARIA Music Awards of 2013, the song was nominated for Best Video.

The song polled at number 17 in the Triple J Hottest 100, 2012. The song polled at number 25 in the Triple J Hottest 100 of the Decade (2010s) in March 2020. The song polled at number 94 in the Triple J Hottest 100 of Australian Songs in July 2025.

The song used extensively by Telstra for many of its advertising campaigns from 2016 through until at least late 2022.

== Track listings ==
Digital download

1. "Clair de Lune" – 7:43

Digital download

1. "Clair de Lune" – 7:42
2. "Clair de Lune" (instrumental) – 7:42
3. "Clair de Lune" (Prins Thomas Diskomiks)– 7:42
4. "Clair de Lune" (Crazy P remix) – 6:49

== Charts ==
Chart (2012–2013)	Peak position
Australia (ARIA)	38

== Certifications ==
Region	Certification	Certified units/sales
Australia (ARIA)	Gold	35,000^{^}
^{^} Shipments figures based on certification alone.

== Thelma Plum version ==
"Clair de Lune"

Single by Thelma Plum
- Released: July 1, 2018
- Length: 4:10
- Label: Warner Music Australia
- Songwriters: Hugo Gruzman, James Lyell
- Producer: Ross James

Thelma Plum singles chronology
"Young in Love" (2014)	"Clair de Lune" (2018)	"Clumsy Love" (2018)

In 2018, Thelma Plum recorded a version of the song for a new Telstra television advert campaign. The ad's theme is "the magic that happens when you combine technology and Telstra's mobile network". The single was released on 1 July 2018.

Plum said: "Telstra asked me to be a part of this; I've never been a part of something like this before, so I thought it would be something really cool to do." Plum said that Flight Facilities sent her the song and that she and producer Ross James worked on the song in one day. Plum said: "I'm really happy with it! It's beautiful, it was easy to do because it's a beautiful piece of work."
