= Christine Hoberg =

American singer

- Origin: Superior, Wisconsin, US
- Genres: Pop, art-pop, electronic music, R&B, soul, experimental
- Years active: 2008–present

Christine Hoberg is an American singer-songwriter and electronic music producer from Superior, Wisconsin, currently based in Minneapolis. She has worked previously with artists such as Flight Facilities, Kiings, Ivan Gough, and Feenixpawl. She is known for her distinctive fluttery voice and live looping.

== Biography ==
Hoberg was raised in Superior, Wisconsin, where she has made music since she was a child beginning with cassette tapes and a karaoke machine. She played in bands while attending Superior High School. She returns often to perform in the Twin Ports including Duluth's Homegrown Music Festival and FeMN Fest. She also cites the area for a source of inspiration, "The extreme weather, seclusion and endless beauty makes it a super inspiring place to make any form of art".

While based out of Brooklyn, Hoberg's most notable appearance as a writer and singer was on Flight Facilities' highest-charting single "Clair de Lune". The song came in at number 17 on the Triple J Hottest 100, 2012, went ARIA platinum and was later featured on the television show Grey's Anatomy. It was remixed by Prins Thomas and Motez (producer) among others. Hoberg's collaboration with Chris Siegel and Strehlow on 'This is How' earned her 'Song of the Year' at the Radio Milwaukee Music Awards. She has played across the United States and seven countries, including performing at Iceland Airwaves.

== Discography ==
=== Albums ===
- "Nice" (2008)
- "Ugly" (2010)
- "Moonlight Never Shined So Bright"(2011)
- "World Within" (2014)
- "Christine Hoberg Remixes" (2015)

=== Appearances and credits ===
Title	Year	Artist	Album	Aria Charts: AUS	Aria Charts: AUS Club	Credits	Label
"My Amour"	2011	Bliss	Ghost of Edward Cayce			Lyrics and vocals	Bliss
"Painting the Past with Lighter Shades of Grey"	2011	Bliss & Sitter	Reincarnation			Lyrics and vocals	Bliss & Sitter
"Clair de Lune"	2012	Flight Facilities	Down to Earth	38		Lyrics and vocals	Future Classic
"Hear Me (Pt 1)"	2014	Ivan Gough & Feenixpawl	Hear Me (Pt 1)	98	19	Lyrics and vocals	Neon Records
"Depart"	2015	SUN NA (Alec Ness)	Surface EP			Lyrics and vocals	SUN NA
"The Time Will Come"	2015	Kiings	Wwydf			Lyrics and vocals	Kiings
"You Can't See Me"	2015	Kiings	Wwydf			Lyrics and vocals	Kiings
"Bonestranded"	2016	David from Venus	Little Glass Slipper			Lyrics and vocals	Emerald & Doreen Records
"Need More Time"	2017	Sharrod Sloans	Grand Design			Lyrics and vocals	Cultured Sect
"This Is How"	2017	Chris Siegel	This Is How			Lyrics and vocals	Noh Life

== Awards and nominations ==
=== AIR Awards ===
The Australian Independent Record Awards (commonly known informally as AIR Awards) is an annual awards night to recognise, promote and celebrate the success of Australia's Independent Music sector.

Year	Nominee / work	Award	Result
2013	"Clair de Lune"	Best Independent Dance/Electronic Single or EP	Nominated

=== APRA Awards ===
The APRA Awards are presented annually from 1982 by the Australasian Performing Right Association (APRA), "honouring composers and songwriters". They commenced in 1982.

Year	Nominee / work	Award	Result	Ref.
2013	"Clair de Lune" (Hugo Gruzman and James Lyell)	Song of the Year	Shortlisted	

=== ARIA Music Awards ===
The ARIA Music Awards is an annual awards ceremony that recognises excellence, innovation, and achievement across all genres of Australian music.

Year	Nominee / work	Award	Result	Ref.
2013	"Clair de Lune" (featuring Christine Hoberg)	Best Video	Nominated	
