= Crave You =

2010 single by Flight Facilities featuring Giselle

Single by Flight Facilities featuring Giselle

from the album Down to Earth
- Released: March 26, 2010
- Recorded: 2009, Sydney, Australia
- Genre: Electronic; pop
- Length: 3:55
- Label: Flight Facilities, Bang Gang
- Songwriters: Hugo Gruzman, James Lyell, Giselle Rosselli
- Producers: Hugo Gruzman, James Lyell

Flight Facilities singles chronology
"Crave You" (2010)	"Foreign Language" (2011)

Music video
- "Crave You feat. Giselle (Official Video)" on YouTube

"Crave You" is a song written by and featuring Australian singer-songwriter Giselle Rosselli for electronic music production DJ duo Flight Facilities's first original single The breakout track was released as their debut single in September 2010 and subsequently featured on the band's debut studio album, Down to Earth (2014).

An acapella reprise featuring Australian recording artist Kylie Minogue was also featured on the album.

In 2023 an interpolation of the main melody and lyrics was used in the song "Other Boys" by Dove Cameron and Marshmello.

== Background ==
After a chance meeting of the songwriter and the DJ duo, who were still performing locally as "Hugo & Jimmy" and looking to release original works, the pair sent Giselle an instrumental track. Rosselli describes in a joint interview with Hugo and James, "I had thought up the main line of the song, “Why can’t you want me like the other boys do, they stare at me while I stare at you,” and had scribbled it down. It so followed that when the guys sent me one of their new loops they had been working on, the lyric happened to fit perfectly to the mood of the track and the melody just followed suit."

== Composition ==
The song was composed using 4/4 common time in the key of C sharp minor, with a tempo of 120 beats per minute. The song is often described as Indie pop, Nu-disco and Indietronica.

== Reception ==
The song polled at number 19 on Triple J's Hottest 100 of 2010. It also came in at #39 in the Hottest 100 of the Decade.

In 2015, the song was listed at number 24 in In the Mix's '100 Greatest Australian Dance Tracks of All Time'.

== Music video ==
A music video was released on YouTube on 10 September 2010. It depicts the paralleled perspective of two young people whose individual experiences are interchanged in the final moments.

== Credits and personnel ==
- Giselle Rosselli – composer, lyricist, featured performer
- Hugo Gruzman – sample production, drum tracking sample
- James Lyell – sample production, drum tracking

== Track listings ==
Digital download

1. "Crave You" – 3:55

Remixes digital download

1. "Crave You" (Version 2) – 7:33
2. "Crave You" (James Curd Pretty Mix) – 4:02
3. "Crave You" (An-2 Remix) – 7:48
4. "Crave You" (The C-90s Remix) – 7:29
5. "Crave You" (Cassian Remix) – 5:38
6. "Crave You" (Graz Remix) – 4:31
7. "Crave You" (Ted & Francis Dub) – 4:18
8. "Crave You" (Adventure Club Remix) – 3:56

10th Anniversary Edition

- A1 "Crave You"
- A2 "Crave You" (Version 2)
- B1 "Crave You" (The C90s Remix)
- B2 "Crave You" (AN-2 Remix)

== Certifications ==
Certifications for "Crave You" (Adventure Club Remix)
Region	Certification	Certified units/sales
Australia (ARIA)	Gold	35,000^{‡}
New Zealand (RMNZ)	Platinum	30,000^{‡}
United States (RIAA)	Gold	500,000^{‡}
^{‡} Sales+streaming figures based on certification alone.
