= Giselle Rosselli =

Giselle
- Also known as: Giselle
- Born: Giselle Rosselli; 4 December 1990 (age 35)
- Origin: Sydney, New South Wales, Australia
- Genres: Pop, Indie Pop
- Occupations: Singer-Songwriter, producer, Multi-instrumentalist
- Instruments: Vocals, piano, accordion, percussion, xylophone
- Years active: 2010–present
- Label: Independent
- Website: www.giselleofficial.com

Giselle Rosselli (born 4 December 1990) is an Australian singer-songwriter, multi-instrumentalist and producer, sometimes seen mononymously as Giselle. Rosselli provided lead vocals and wrote lyrics for the first original song "Crave You" by indie electro DJ duo Flight Facilities. The track was listed at No. 19 on the Hottest 100 of 2010 by listeners of national radio station Triple J. Also in 2010 Rosselli's track, "They Stay Down Deep", was featured on the United Kingdom TV series Skins (series 4, episode 7). In April 2012 Rosselli released a solo single, "Silk".

== Biography ==
Giselle Rosselli was born on 4 December 1990 and was raised in Sydney. She is the daughter of local architect, Luigi Rosselli, and visual artist, Juliet Holmes à Court. Rosselli has two brothers. Growing up in a creative family, she began to write her own music as a way of developing her artistic independence and creativity. Originally studying mathematics at the University of Melbourne, she deferred her course in mid-2010 to pursue writing and recording full-time.

As an independent beginning artist, Rosselli first posted a few demo songs on her MySpace account, somewhere between 2007 and 2011: "Close But Far", "Piano Song", "The Unwell Boy", "Small People", "Treehouse", "Why Should I Say What I Feel" and "Yesterday's Mind". Most of these songs have been lost due to the sudden Myspace redesign in June 2013.

She then worked with indie electro DJ duo, Flight Facilities on the track, "Crave You". The duo consists of Hugo Gruzman and James Lyell and they began mixing tracks by other artists in 2009. Rosselli co-wrote "Crave You" with Gruzman and Lyell. As a remix the song "Crave You" was featured on MTV's partnered website Ourstage through American Rap artist Jay Entendre formerly known as The Kid Bilal as a remix called "She Craves Me". Gruzman told Dave Ruby Howe of In the Mix how the duo had contacted Rosselli to get help with their first original track. Rosselli had met Gruzman in mid-2009, he was interested in using her skill on xylophone, however, after "[I] heard her sing and I just knew that she had to do the song. We sent the track over to her and she smashed it. We were so lucky to be able to work with her, she's just great". It was listed at No. 19 on the Hottest 100 of 2010, by listeners of national radio station, Triple J. As a remix it was featured on MTV's partnered website Ourstage through American rap artist, The Kid Bilal, as "She Craves Me". It was used as the soundtrack to Myer's 2010 Spring Racing Carnival TV commercial campaign.

In 2010, Rosselli's track "They Stay Down Deep" was used on the United Kingdom TV series Skins (series 4, episode 7). Also in that year, she provided the piano and additional vocals for the Vorad Fils album Powwow Ten. In October 2010 she provided vocals for the Bag Raiders track: "Gone Away", on their debut album of the same name.

In April 2012 Rosselli issued a solo single, "Silk", which received rotation at Triple J by Richard Kingsmill. Chad Hillard of HillyDilly website praised her vocals "it's as if everything else you were thinking about disappears. Stress, anxiety, whatever, once her voice hits you, everything dissipates".

In October 2012 she released the instrumental single "Nigerian Rubiks Cube", and in the same year she also provided the instrumental background track "Cello Song", for a short visual documentary from her father. The track "Carnivore" was released in 2013. Next in September 2014, she recorded the songs "Carry the Thought" and "Gnawa Runner" in London.

In 2016, a new single was released: "Arms Around Me". After this, there was a 5-year hiatus, until the release of "We've Got That" in March 2021.
