= Flight Facilities =

Australian electronic music production duo

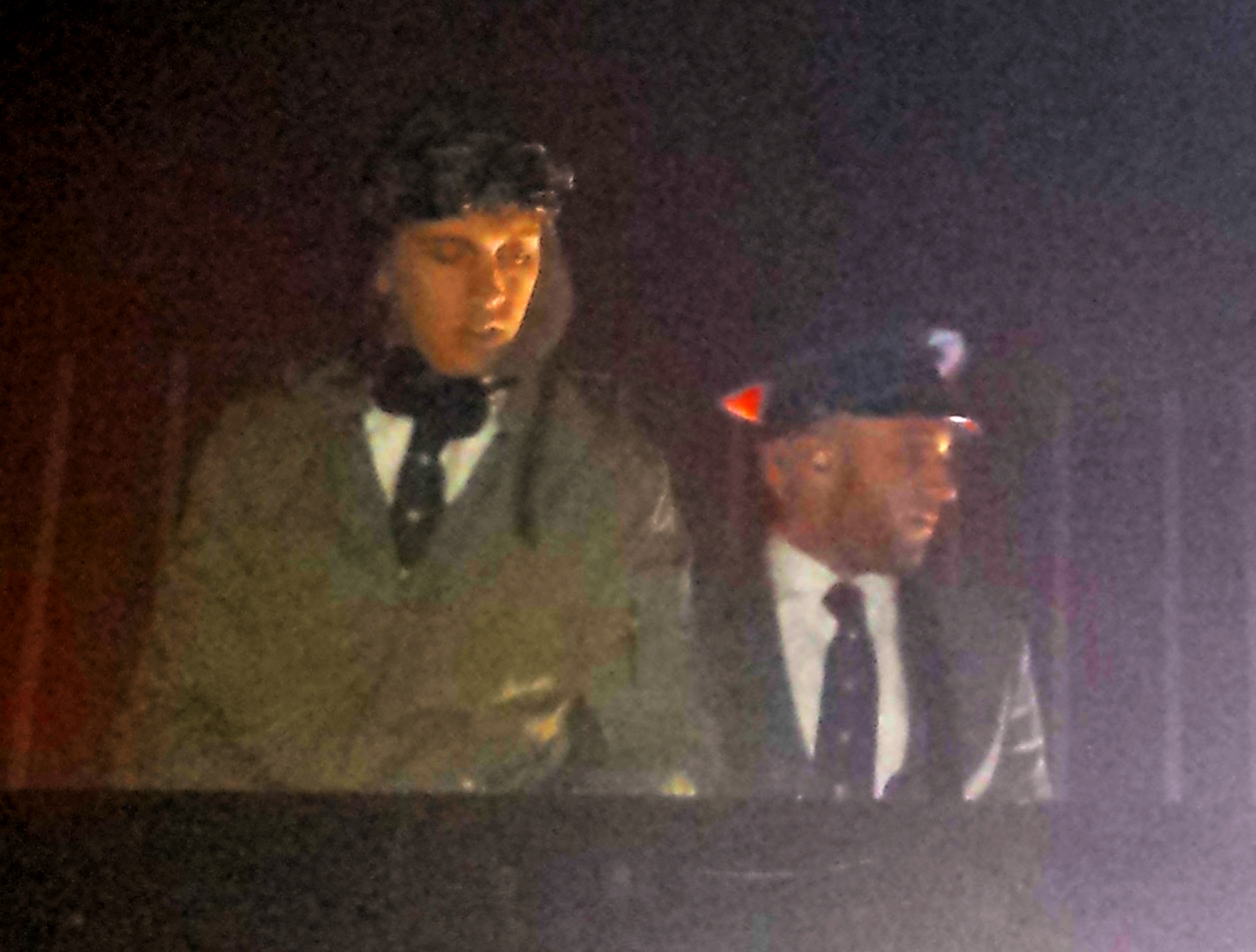
- Flight Facilities performing at the Corona in 2017

Background information
- Also known as: Hugo & Jimmy
- Origin: Sydney, New South Wales, Australia
- Genres: Disco; house; indie pop; electronic
- Years active: 2009–present
- Labels: Future Classic; Glassnote
- Members: Hugo Gruzman; James Lyell
- Website: flightfacilities.com

Flight Facilities is an Australian electronic music production duo that also performs as Hugo & Jimmy. In 2009, they began mixing songs by other artists before crafting their own original material. The duo consists of Hugo Gruzman and James Lyell. Their debut album Down to Earth was released in October 2014 and features prominent names in the industry such as Kylie Minogue, Emma Louise, Reggie Watts, Bishop Nehru, Christine Hoberg, Owl Eyes, and Stee Downes.

== History ==
=== 2009–2020: Down to Earth and Live with the Melbourne Symphony Orchestra ===
Flight Facilities are a duo consisting of Hugo Gruzman and James Lyell, which first began mixing various songs by other artists in 2009 in Sydney. They have reworked Bag Raiders, Toecutter and Sneaky Sound System. Their first original song, "Crave You", written by and featuring Giselle Rosselli, received considerable airtime in Australia on the alternative music radio station Triple J in 2010. It was co-written by Gruzman, Lyell and Rosselli after the duo contacted the musician/producer to provide an original track for a compilation album by their label Bang Gang. In July 2010 Flight Facilities commenced their first tour, Maiden Voyage. They played at various Australian nightclubs: Elsewhere in the Gold Coast, Empire in Brisbane, Limbo in Adelaide, and Adult Disco in Sydney before going to Japan to play at Onzieme in Osaka, and Le Baron in Tokyo. "Crave You" was listed at No. 19 in the Triple J Hottest 100, 2010, and was featured as the soundtrack to Myer's 2010 Spring Racing Carnival television commercial campaign.

In 2011, "Foreign Language" was nominated for a J-Award for its music video, and appeared as number 72 in the Triple J Hottest 100, 2011. In February that year while performing as Hugo & Jimmy in Jakarta, Indonesia, the duo claimed to be from Trinidad and Tobago. They have jokingly told journalists the same thing and that they are Calvin Harris.

In 2012, "Clair de Lune" appeared as number 17 in the Triple J Hottest 100, 2012. In April 2012, they were broadcast on Triple J with four one-hour-long mixes, each featuring a decade spanning from 1972 to 2012.

In 2013, KCRW invited Flight Facilities to SXSW and headlined their home countries Falls Festival and Southbound Festivals (alongside The Roots, !!!, MGMT, Bonobo and Grizzly Bear). In 2014 they were asked to play one of the world's biggest festivals, Coachella Music and Arts Festival in Palm Springs where they played to 8000 plus people each day.

The C90s track "Shine a Light" (Flight Facilities remix) gained mainstream attention in 2013 when featured in the popular video game Grand Theft Auto V, created by Rockstar Games.

In 2014, "Two Bodies" (featuring Emma Louise) appeared as number 39 and "Sunshine" (Ft. Reggie Watts) as number 52 in the Triple J Hottest 100, 2014. On 24 October 2014, they issued their debut album, Down to Earth, which reached No. 3 on the ARIA Albums Chart. It received a gold certification from ARIA by the end of the following year.

In 2015, Down to Earth was made into a music video starring Sam Rockwell. At the ARIA Music Awards that year, Flight Facilities were nominated in three categories: Album of the Year, Best Pop Release and Best Cover Art (by Timothy Lovett) for Down to Earth.

In December 2015 Flight Facilities released a live album following their performance with the Melbourne Symphony Orchestra. The album consisted of tracks from the duo's debut album as well as previous releases. It won the ARIA Award for Best Classical Album at the ARIA Music Awards of 2016.

In 2017, Flight Facilities released the song "Arty Boy", featuring Emma Louise on vocals, followed by the single "Stranded", featuring Broods, Reggie Watts and Saro.

In November 2019, Google began a YouTube campaign for Google Nest products using Flight Facilities "Better Than Ever".

=== 2021: Forever ===
In September 2021, Flight Facilities announced the release of their second studio album, titled Forever. The album was released on 12 November 2021, with a single called "Heavy" featuring the American artist Your Smith, released a week before the album was due.

In November 2022, Flight Facilities released a two-track EP titled Lost Forever.

== Discography ==
=== Studio albums ===
List of studio albums, with release date, label, selected chart positions, and certifications shown
Title	Album details	Peak chart positions	Certifications
Title	Album details	AUS	Certifications
Down to Earth	Released: 24 October 2014; Label: Future Classic; Format: CD, LP, digital download	3	ARIA: Gold
Forever	Released: 12 November 2021; Label: Future Classic; Format: CD, LP, digital download	6	

=== Live albums ===
List of live albums, with release date, label, and selected chart positions shown
Title	Album details	Peak chart positions
Title	Album details	AUS
Live with the Melbourne Symphony Orchestra	Released: 18 December 2015; Label: Future Classic; Format: Digital download, streaming	108

=== Extended plays ===
List of EPs with release date, label, and selected chart positions shown
Title	EP details
Lost Forever	Released: 11 November 2022; Label: Future Classic; Format: Digital download, streaming

=== Singles ===
List of 2010–2019 singles, with year released, selected chart positions and certifications, and album name shown
Title	Year	Peak chart positions		Certifications	Album
Title	Year	AUS	NZ Hot	Certifications	Album
"Crave You" (featuring Giselle Rosselli)	2010	—	—	ARIA: Gold; RIAA: Gold; RMNZ: Platinum	Down to Earth
"Foreign Language"	2011	87	—		Non-album singles
"Feeling"	2011	—	—		Non-album singles
"With You" (featuring Grovesnor)	2012	—	—		Non-album singles
"Clair de Lune" (featuring Christine Hoberg)	2012	38	—	ARIA: Gold	Down to Earth
"I Didn't Believe" (featuring Elizabeth Rose)	2013	104	—		Non-album single
"Stand Still" (featuring Micky Green)	2013	61	—		Down to Earth
"Two Bodies" (featuring Emma Louise)	2014	67	—		Down to Earth
"Sunshine" (featuring Reggie Watts)	2014	85	—		Down to Earth
"Down to Earth"	2015	—	—		Down to Earth
"Heart Attack" (featuring Owl Eyes)	2015	—	—		Down to Earth
"Arty Boy" (featuring Emma Louise)	2017	—	—		Non-album singles
"Stranded" (featuring Broods, Reggie Watts, and Saro)	2017	190	—		Non-album singles
"Need You" (featuring Nïka)	2018	96	—	ARIA: Gold	Non-album singles
"All Your Love" (featuring Dustin Tebbutt)	2018	154	—		Non-album singles
"Better Than Ever" (featuring Aloe Blacc)	2019	98	31		Non-album singles

List of 2020–present singles, with year released, selected chart positions and certifications, and album name shown
Title	Year	Peak chart positions							Album
Title	Year	BLR Air.	CIS Air.	EST Air.	KAZ Air.	LAT Air.	NZ Hot	RUS Air.	Album
"Lights Up" (featuring Channel Tres)	2021	*	—	*			—	—	Forever
"The Ghost"	2021	*	—	*			—	—	Forever
"Move" (featuring Drama)	2021	*	—	*			—	—	Forever
"Forever" (featuring Broods)	2021	*	—	*			25	—	Forever
"Heavy" (featuring Your Smith)	2021	*	—	*			—	—	Forever
"Dollar $hort" (with Drama)	2023	—	—	—	—	—	—	—	TBA
"Trouble" (with Owl Eyes)	2024	20	26	64	6	9	—	18	TBA
"Days of the Week"	2024	—	—	—	—	—	—	—	TBA
"Dancing on My Own" (with Drama)	2024	—	—	—	—	—	—	—	TBA
"Know You Love Me" (with Riva Starr)	2025	—	—	—	—	—	—	—	TBA
"Run"	2025	—	—	—	—	—	—	—	TBA
"Forever in My Room" (featuring Broods)	2025	—	—	—	—	—	26	—	TBA
"—" denotes a recording that did not chart or was not released. "*" denotes the chart did not exist at that time.

== Awards and nominations ==
=== AIR Awards ===
The Australian Independent Record Awards (known colloquially as the AIR Awards) is an annual awards night to recognise, promote and celebrate the success of Australia's independent music sector.

Year	Nominee / work	Award	Result	Ref.
2013	"Clair de Lune" (featuring Christine Hoberg)	Best Independent Dance / Electronic Single or EP	Nominated	
2015	Down to Earth	Best Independent Album	Nominated	
2015	Down to Earth	Best Independent Dance / Electronic Album	Won	
2022	Forever	Best Independent Dance or Electronica Album or EP	Won	

=== APRA Awards ===
The APRA Awards are presented annually from 1982 by the Australasian Performing Right Association (APRA), "honouring composers and songwriters". They commenced in 1982.

Year	Nominee / work	Award	Result	Ref.
2013	"Clair de Lune" (Hugo Gruzman and James Lyell)	Song of the Year	Shortlisted	
2023	"Heavy" (feat. Your Smith)	Most Performed Dance/ Electronic Work of the Year	Nominated	

=== ARIA Music Awards ===
The ARIA Music Awards is an annual awards ceremony that recognises excellence, innovation, and achievement across all genres of Australian music. Flight Facilities have won one award from 5 nominations.

Year	Nominee / work	Award	Result	Ref.
2013	"Clair de Lune" (featuring Christine Hoberg)	Best Video	Nominated	
2015	Down to Earth	Album of the Year	Nominated	
2015	Down to Earth	Best Dance Release	Nominated	
2015	Timothy Lovett for Down to Earth	Best Cover Art	Nominated	
2016	Live with the Melbourne Symphony Orchestra	Best Classical Album	Won	

=== J Award ===
The J Awards are an annual series of Australian music awards that were established by the Australian Broadcasting Corporation's youth-focused radio station Triple J. They commenced in 2005.

Year	Nominee / work	Award	Result	Ref.
2012	"Foreign Language"	Australian Video of the Year	Nominated	
2014	Down to Earth	Australian Album of the Year	Nominated	

=== Helpmann Awards ===
The Helpmann Awards is an awards show, celebrating live entertainment and performing arts in Australia, presented by industry group Live Performance Australia since 2001. Note: 2020 and 2021 were cancelled due to the COVID-19 pandemic.

Year	Nominee / work	Award	Result	Ref.
2016	Flight Facilities Perform Live with Melbourne Symphony Orchestra	Best Australian Contemporary Concert	Nominated	
