= Do It Now =

Do It Now may refer to:

== Media ==
- Do It NOW, original name of the journal of the National Organization for Women

== Music ==
=== Albums ===
- Do It Now! (Clifford Coulter album), 1971
- Do It Now! (Jack McDuff album), 1967
- Let's Do It Now, a 1999 album by Haddaway

=== Songs ===
- "Do It Now (Mashd N Kutcher song)", a 2014 song by Mashd N Kutcher
- "Do It! Now", a 2002 song by Morning Musume
- "Do It Now", a song by Ernest Tubb & The Texas Troubadors from the 1960 album Ernest Tubb Record Shop
- "Do It Now", a 1962 song by Rusty Warren
- "Do It Now", a 1963 song by Bessie Banks
- "Do It Now", a song by The S.O.S. Band from the 1981 album Too
- "Do It Now", a song by The Clash, B-side to "This Is England"
- "Do It Now", a 1996 song by Coast
- "Do It Now", a song by Mos Def from the 1999 album Black on Both Sides
- "Do It Now", a song by Nebula from the 2001 album Charged

== Films ==
- Do It Now (film), 1924 American melodrama film directed by Duke Worne

== Poems ==
- "Do It Now", a poem by Berton Braley, c. 1915
