= Lgeez =

Australian hip-hop duo

- Origin: Australia
- Genres: Hip-hop, trap, grime
- Years active: 2014–present
- Label: Broken Tooth Entertainment
- Members: Alex Jones; Son of Sam

Lgeez are an Australian hip hop music duo formed by Alex Jones (from Melbourne) and Son of Sam (from Sydney) in 2014. Their debut album Cloud 9 was released in October the same year.

== Career ==
Prior to 2014, Alex Jones used the rap aliases Flea and Dr. Flea. He released his debut mixtape, Blood Runs Deep in 2011. In 2012 he collaborated with DJ Will Sparks on the song "Chemical Energy".

Son of Sam (formerly known as SW, Jam Master Sam and sometimes referred to as Sunnah) released his debut mixtape Summer of Sam in December of 2012.

After gaining attention as solo artists on YouTube and SoundCloud, the pair formed the duo Lgeez in 2014 and released their debut album, Cloud 9. The album peaked at No. 19 on the ARIA Hip-Hop/R&B Albums Chart.

Lgeez have been cited as influences by other Australian hip-hop artists, including Chillinit, HP Boyz, Indigomerkaba and Wombat. They have also received praise from rapper 360.

== Discography ==
=== Studio albums ===
List of studio albums with release details and chart positions
Title	Details	Peak chart positions
Title	Details	AUS (Urban)
Cloud 9	Released: 24 October 2014; Label: Broken Tooth Entertainment; Format: CD, digital download, streaming	19

=== Extended plays ===
List of EPs with release details and label shown
Title	Details
Keep on Moving (Alex Jones)	Released: 9 August 2013; Label: L7 Entertainment; Format: Digital download, streaming, CD

=== Mixtapes ===
List of mixtapes with release details and label shown
Title	Details
Blood Runs Deep (Alex Jones)	Released: 20 July 2011; Label: Self-released; Format: Digital download, streaming
Best of Both Worlds (Alex Jones)	Released: 13 July 2012; Label: Self-released; Format: Digital download, streaming
Summer of Sam (Son of Sam)	Released: 1 December 2012; Label: The Mobside Inc.; Format: Digital download
Jackin' For Beats (Alex Jones)	Released: 24 December 2012; Label: Self-released; Format: Digital download
#slapahipsterintheface (Lgeez)	Released: 3 April 2015; Label: Self-released; Format: Digital download, streaming
Blood Runs Deep Volume II (Alex Jones)	Released: 3 September 2016; Label: Self-released; Format: Digital download

=== Singles ===
Title	Year	Album
"The Anthem"	2014	Cloud 9
"MDMA"	2014	Cloud 9
"Speed of Sound"	2014	Cloud 9
"Scat Day"	2014	Cloud 9

==== As featured artist ====
Incomplete list of album singles and non-album singles with release details
Title	Year	Album
"Chemical Energy" (Will Sparks featuring Alex Jones)	2012	Non-album single
"Heath Ledger" (Joel Fletcher & Alex Jones)	2013	Non-album single
"Know This Don" (Fraksha featuring Alex Jones)	2013	Non-album single
"My Time" (Will Sparks featuring Alex Jones)	2016	Non-album single
"Level Up" (Fraksha featuring Alex Jones)	2018	Still Here
"Messenger" (Posseshot featuring Alex Jones)	2018	Posseshot
"Lodge Meeting" (Posseshot featuring Seru, Muscles, Fraksha, Hazrd, Diem, KHA, and Alex Jones	2019	Non-album single
"4 Days in the Trap" (Huskii featuring Alex Jones and Chillinit	2019	Non-album single
"Chemical Energy 2021" (Will Sparks featuring Alex Jones)	2021	Non-album single
"Messenger Part 2" (Posseshot featuring Alex Jones)	2021	Ps3: Still In Tha Game
"All That I Got" (Posseshot featuring Alex Jones)	2021	Cityloop
