= Bay Dreams =

New Zealand music festival

- Dates: 2 January (North), 4 January (South)
- Locations: Tauranga and Queenstown, New Zealand
- Years active: 2016–2024
- Attendance: 50,000 national (2018)
- Website: baydreams.co.nz

Bay Dreams was an annual music festival held in Tauranga and Queenstown, New Zealand. The festival began in Tauranga (North Island) in 2016 and in 2019 expanded to the South Island.

Organisers announced that the 2025 festival would not go ahead, calling it a "hiatus" rather than a cancellation. No festival was announced for 2026.

== Line-ups ==
=== 2016 ===
Bay Dreams launched on 2 January 2016. It featured Pendulum, David Dallas, Carmada, P-Money, and The Black Seeds.

=== 2017 ===
Bay Dreams 2017 took place on 2 January 2017, quickly arising to become the largest summer festival that season with over 18,500 attendees. It featured Yelawolf, Shapeshifter, Sticky Fingers, Grandmaster Flash, Peking Duk, Ryan Hemsworth, and Mitch James

=== 2018 ===
Bay Dreams 2018 took place on 2 January 2018. It featured DJ Snake, Foster the People, Machine Gun Kelly, Ocean Alley.

=== 2019 ===
==== North ====
Bay Dreams North 2019 took place on 2 January 2019 in Mount Maunganui, Tauranga, with a warm up event happening on 1 January. It featured Cardi B, Rich The Kid, Tash Sultana, Shapeshifter, Sticky Fingers, Peking Duk, Suicideboys, Macky Gee, Pnau, Sheck Wes, Katchafire.

Migos were scheduled to perform, however pulled out of the festival and were replaced with Sheck Wes and Rich The Kid.

30,000 attended the event making it New Zealand's largest festival.

==== South ====
Bay Dreams South 2019 launched on 4 January 2019. It featured Tash Sultana, Shapeshifter, Sticky Fingers, Peking Duk, Suicideboys, Macky Gee, Pnau, Katchafire.

20,000 attended this first event making it the largest festival in the South Island.

=== 2020 ===
Bay Dreams 2020 took place in Tauranga on 2 January and in Nelson on 4 January. Both events featured headlining act Tyler, The Creator, as well as Skepta, Yelawolf, Ocean Alley, Gunna, Cordae, and more.

=== 2021 ===
Bay Dreams 2021 was held in Tauranga on 3 January and in Nelson on 5 January. Both events featured headlining DJ sets from Peking Duk, Sub Focus, and Dimension among others.

They also featured sets from artists and bands such as EarthGang, HP Boyz, Dave Dobbyn, Katchafire, Home Brew, Melodownz, and more. The Nelson event also featured a set from L.A.B.

=== 2022 ===
The 2022 event was eventually cancelled in light of the ongoing COVID-19 Pandemic.

The line-up planned to include: Netsky, Chase & Status, Tash Sultana, Hybrid Minds, Blindspott, and more.

=== 2023 ===
The 2023 event occurred on 3 January (Mount Maunganui) and 5 January 2023 (Nelson).

The line-up included: Diplo, Denzel Curry, Freddie Gibbs, Hybrid Minds Outlines, ONEFOUR, KOVEN, SG Lewis, Sticky Fingers and more.

=== 2024 ===
In 2024 the South Island event was relocated to Queenstown.

The 2024 event occurred on 3 January (Mount Maunganui) and 5 January 2023 (Queenstown).

The line-up included: Quavo, Sigma, Bad Boy Chiller Crew, Vibe Chemistry b2b Alcemist, Lucille Croft, and DJ Skepsis.
