= The Bootleg Tapes (Caress Your Soul) =

EP by Sticky Fingers
- Released: 8 March 2024
- Length: 20:30
- Label: Westway

Sticky Fingers chronology
Lekkerboy (2022)	The Bootleg Tapes (Caress Your Soul) (2024)

The Bootleg Tapes (Caress Your Soul) is an extended play by Australian rock band Sticky Fingers, released digitally on 8 March 2024. It was also included as a bonus disc on the 10th anniversary of their debut studio album, Caress Your Soul.

Speaking on Facebook, the group said the release includes "never-heard before tracks from the Caress era" and alternate versions of songs "recovered from the archives."

The Bootleg Tapes (Caress Your Soul) debuted at number 36 on the New Zealand Album chart and saw their debut album reach a new peak of 11 on the ARIA Charts.

== Track listing ==
The Bootleg Tapes (Caress Your Soul)
No.	Title	Length
1.	"Bootleg Rascal ('23 Remix)"	3:52
2.	"Big Mits"	3:45
3.	"Easily" (demo)	2:58
4.	"Slow Soul"	2:08
5.	"Won't Be Long"	3:11
6.	"One Stop Shot" (demo)	4:42
7.	"How to Fly (V2)"	3:12

== Charts ==
Chart performance for Caress Your Soul
Chart (2024)	Peak position
New Zealand Albums (RMNZ)	36
