= Mercury Baypark Stadium and Arena =

Multi-purpose stadium in New Zealand

Mercury Baypark Stadium and Mercury Arena
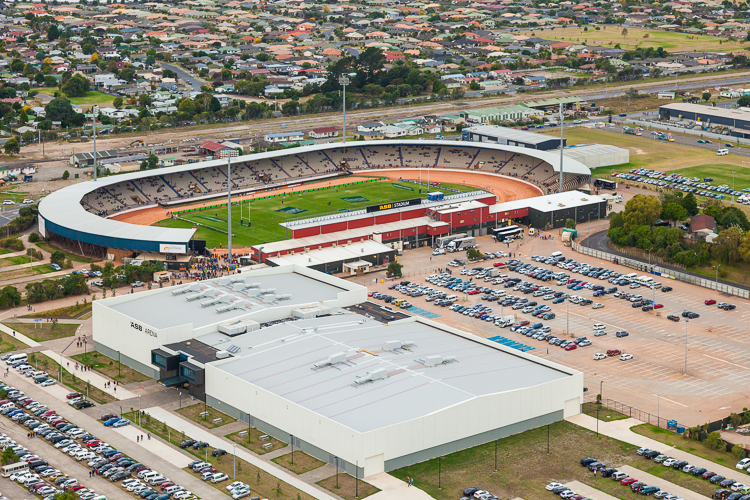
- Aerial view of Stadium
- Interactive map of Mercury Baypark Stadium and Mercury Arena
- Former names: Trustpower Baypark, ASB Baypark, Bluechip Stadium, TECT Stadium
- Location: 81 Truman Lane, Mount Maunganui Tauranga, Bay of Plenty, New Zealand
- Coordinates: 37°41′6″S 176°13′34″E
- Owner: Tauranga City Council
- Operator: Bay Venues Limited
- Capacity: 19,800

Construction
- Built: 2000
- Opened: 2001

Tenant
- Bay of Plenty Speedway Association

Website
- mercurybaypark.co.nz

Mercury Baypark Stadium (formerly known as Trustpower Baypark Stadium) is a multi-purpose stadium in Tauranga, New Zealand. It is currently used for dirt track speedway and jetsprint events during summer, and various other events throughout the year.

A $42 million multi-purpose facility, the Mercury Arena, is situated next to the stadium.

The arena also has a cafe and provides catering services through the onsite caterer Bay Catering.

== Facilities ==
=== Mercury Arena ===
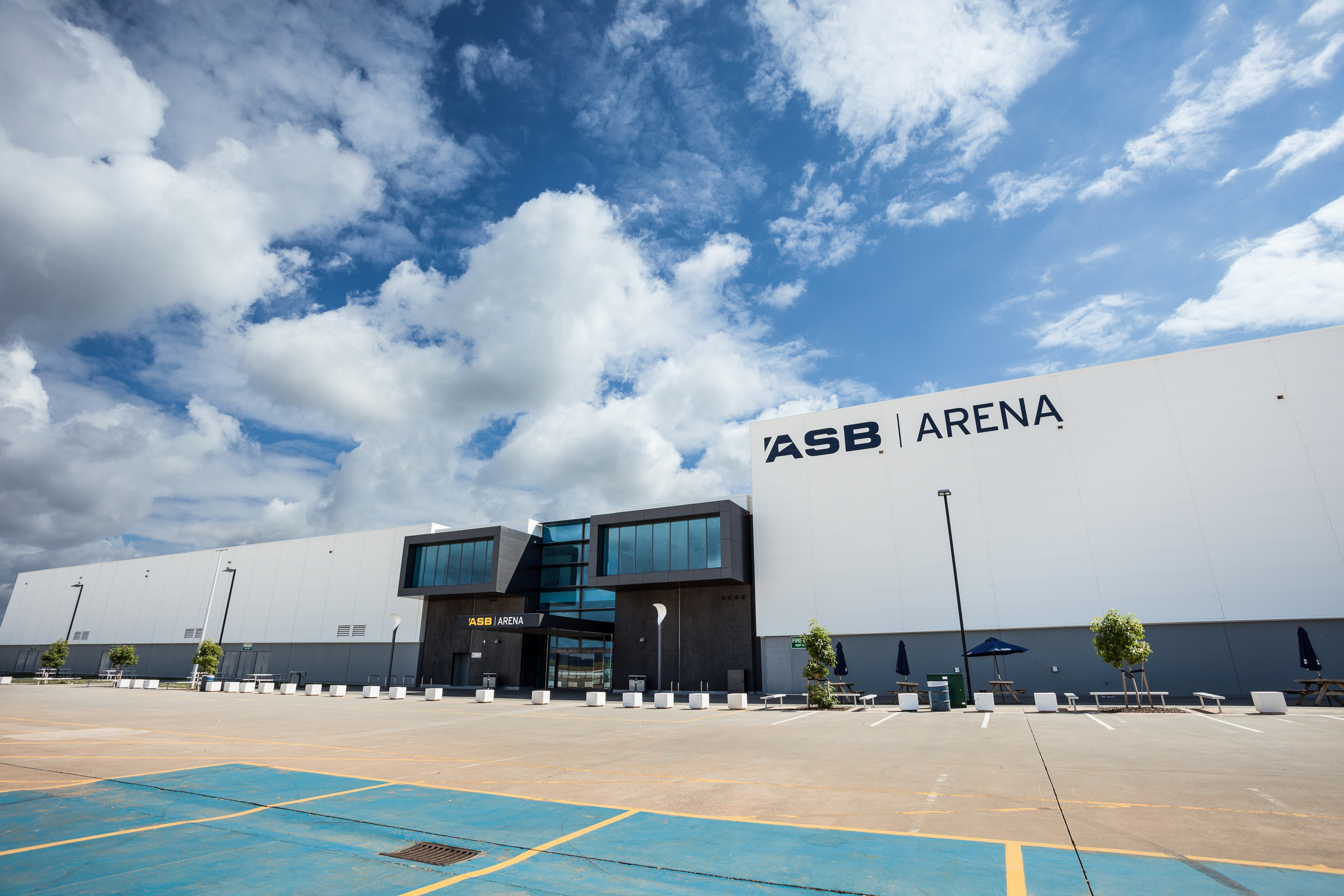
ASB Arena in Tauranga

Mercury Arena is a multi-purpose venue in Tauranga, New Zealand, which arrived to the area in 2011, providing versatile options for sports, business, leisure and entertainment events. The $42 million facility has hosted events from national sporting fixtures, trade shows and conferences, to gala dinners, corporate hospitality and international music acts.

=== Mercury Stadium ===
A roof over the south stand completed in 2011, means more than 90% of grandstand seating at the stadium is covered ensuring that fans can enjoy the event entertainment in the comfort of shelter whatever the weather.

=== Outdoor area ===
The Plaza, located at the eastern end of Mercury Baypark, is a 700 m^{2} courtyard.

A second sports field onsite at Mercury Baypark provides additional turf for training and event requirements.

== Activities ==
=== Sports ===
Mercury Arena is capable of hosting a number of sporting events from professional level games right down to community sports leagues. The multi purpose courts are able to host indoor netball, indoor football, fastnet, volleyball and basketball games.

=== Conferences and meetings ===
The Arena is able to host gatherings for 12 to 1,200 people.

=== Exhibitions and trade shows ===
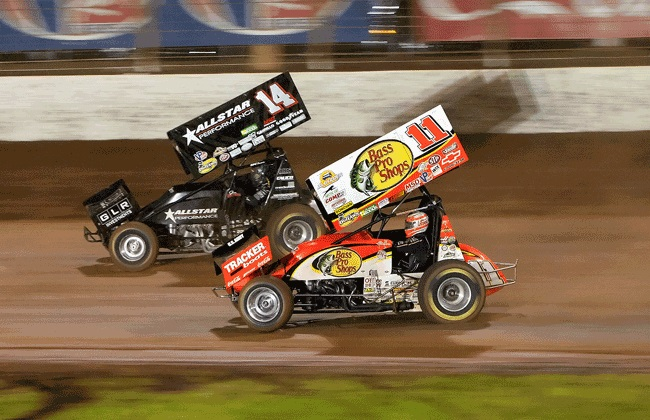
Sprint cars at the Baypark Speedway in Tauranga

Various exhibitions and Trade Shows are held in the Arena each year in the 4500 m^{2} TECT Auditorium and the 2,349 m^{2} Lion Foundation Centre. In the past these have included the Tauranga Spring Home Show, the Seriously Good Food Show, Tauranga Career and Business Expo, Women's Lifestyle Expo, the Tauranga Wedding Show and an Active Retiree Expo.

=== Concerts ===
Various concerts have been held at the Mercury Arena in the past including performances from Bryan Adams, the Beach Boys, 10cc, Sol3 Mio and Savage. Mercury Baypark has also hosted Bay Dreams, an annual music festival held in early January.

=== Baypark Speedway ===
The Mercury Stadium is home to a speedway in Tauranga.

== Transportation ==
Located on the junction of major state highways, only minutes from Tauranga Airport, Mercury Baypark provides parking on site for up to 5,000 vehicles. It is within easy reach of the CBD, hotels, motels, shopping and entertainment. The region is linked by services to international airports in Rotorua, Hamilton and Auckland.
