= Fiona Hill =

Fiona Hill could refer to:

- Fiona Hill (presidential advisor) (born 1965), British-American foreign affairs specialist and academic
- Fiona Hill (British political adviser) (born 1973), British political adviser and former Downing Street Chief of Staff to Theresa May
- Fiona Hill (composer), (born 1976), Australian composer
