= Nerve (musician) =

Australian musician

- Born: Toby Nicholls
- Origin: Brisbane, Queensland, Australia
- Genre: Hip-hop music
- Occupations: rapper; singer-songwriter; producer; emcee
- Years active: 2017-present
- Website: www.nerveproductions.com.au

Toby Nicholls, known professionally as Nerve, is an Australian rapper, producer, singer and emcee. In August 2026, Nerve released Growing Pains. It debuted at number 14 on the ARIA Charts.

== Career ==
In 2017, Nerve released debut single "Snot Rocket", quickly followed by EP Game Over and Night Shifts with Wombat.

In June 2018, Nerve released debut album Sober, included underground hit "Where You Been" featuring Chillinit. In 2019, he released the conceptual EP, Mumma's Boy.

In August 2026, Nerve released Growing Pains. It debuted at number 14 on the ARIA Charts.

== Discography ==
=== Albums ===
List of albums, with selected chart positions
Title	Album details	Peak chart positions
Title	Album details	AUS
Sober	Released: June 2018; Label: Nerve Productions; Format: Digital	
Growing Pains	Released: 21 August 2026; Label: XEL (NVE9001); Format: Digital, LP	14

=== Extended plays ===
List of EPs, with selected details
Title	Album details
Game Over	Released: March 2017; Label: Nerve Productions; Format: Digital
Night Shift (with Wombat)	Released: September 2017; Label: Nerve Productions; Format: Digital
Mumma's Boy	Released: September 2019; Label: Nerve Productions; Format: Digital
Tall Poppy Season	Released: May 2021; Label: Nerve Productions; Format: Digital

== Awards and nominations ==
=== ARIA Music Awards ===
The ARIA Music Awards is an annual awards ceremony that recognises excellence, innovation, and achievement across all genres of Australian music.

Year	Nominee / work	Award	Result	Ref.
2026	Growing Pains	Best Hip Hop/Rap Release	Nominated	

=== J Awards ===
The J Awards are an annual series of Australian music awards that were established by the Australian Broadcasting Corporation's youth-focused radio station Triple J. They commenced in 2005.

Year	Nominee / work	Award	Result	Ref.
2026	Growing Pains	Australian Album of the Year	Nominated	
