= Yours to Keep =

Yours to Keep may refer to:

- Yours to Keep (Albert Hammond Jr. album), 2006
- Yours to Keep (Sticky Fingers album), 2019
- "Yours to Keep", a 2000 song by Teddybears STHLM, from the album Rock 'n' Roll Highschool
- "Yours to Keep", a 1994 song by Guided by Voices, from the album Bee Thousand
