= Lissi =

Lissi may refer to:

- Lissi und der wilde Kaiser, 2007 German animated film
- Lissi Alandh (1930–2008), Swedish film, stage and television actress

== See also ==
- Lisi (disambiguation)
