= Lekkerboy =

Studio album by Sticky Fingers
- Released: 20 April 2022
- Length: 52:07
- Label: Westway

Sticky Fingers chronology
Yours to Keep (2019)	Lekkerboy (2022)	The Bootleg Tapes (Caress Your Soul) (2024)

Singles from Lekkerboy
- 1. "We Can Make the World Glow" Released: September 2021; 2. "Saves the Day" / "My Rush" Released: November 2021; 3. "Crooked Eyes" Released: December 2021; 4. "Lekkerboy" Released: January 2022; 5. "Multiple Facets of the Same Diamond" / "Love Song" Released: February 2022; 6. "Lupo the Wolf" Released: April 2022

Singles from (deluxe)
- 1. "Sidelines" Released: November 2022; 2. "Waterfall" Released: January 2023; 3. "Someone You Need" Released: March 2023

Lekkerboy is the fifth studio album by Australian rock band Sticky Fingers. The album was announced in March 2022 released on 20 April 2022. It features "guerrilla protester" Danny Lim on the cover. The group explained the word "Lekker" is Dutch for "tasty", saying: "When you find yourself in the Netherlands you hear it a lot. It's equivalent to saying 'ye cool' or 'sssiiiicccckkk'."

The group said the album was originally titled We Can Make the World Glow and was written during the COVID-19 pandemic, with Eric da Silva Gruener (p.k.a. "Beaker Best") saying, "Even when the world stops our story keeps unravelling and we're good at capturing that story. Lekkerboy is open to your own interpretation and the poetry is left for the taking."

The album peaked at number 37 on the ARIA Albums chart in July 2023 following the deluxe vinyl release.

== Reception ==
Wonderland Magazine said "Diverse in every sense, the syrupy-sounding vocals of the band are manipulated to present themselves as both soft and tortured depending on which track you are diving into, a divine feature that is built upon when their signature bouncy production brings a chaos that harmoniously clashes with laid back and acoustic cuts."

== Track listing ==
No.	Title	Length
1.	"My Rush"	5:28
2.	"Napalm"	2:48
3.	"Lekkerboy"	5:01
4.	"Saves the Day"	4:04
5.	"Love Song"	2:43
6.	"We Can Make the World Glow"	3:41
7.	"Lupo the Wolf"	3:13
8.	"Where I'm From"	3:53
9.	"Crooked Eyes"	4:15
10.	"Smoke Rings"	4:28
11.	"Any Day Now"	3:01
12.	"Queen"	4:04
13.	"Multiple Facets of the Same Diamond"	5:22

Deluxe (bonus tracks)
No.	Title	Length
1.	"Waterfall"	3:08
2.	"Fortunes, Seasides & Girls"	4:07
3.	"What's Faded"	4:09
4.	"Sidelines"	3:25
5.	"New Pretend"	3:46
6.	"Someone You Need"	3:11

== Charts ==
Chart (2022–23)	Peak position
Australian Albums (ARIA)	37
UK Vinyl Albums (OCC)	29
UK Physical Albums (OCC)	86

== Release history ==
Country	Date	Format	Label	Catalogue
Australia / UK / US	20 April 2022	Digital download, CD, LP	Westway	WC001
Australia (deluxe)	3 March 2023	digital download	Westway	WC001
Australia (deluxe)	30 June 2023	2×LP	Westway	WC001
