= Gold Snafu =

2014 song by Sticky Fingers

Single by Sticky Fingers

from the album Land of Pleasure
- Released: 14 February 2014
- Length: 3:37
- Label: Sureshaker
- Songwriters: Patrick Cornwall; Seamus Coyle; Dylan Frost; Eric da Silva Gruener; Daniel Neurath

Sticky Fingers singles chronology
"How to Fly" (2013)	"Gold Snafu" (2014)	"Just for You" (2014)

"Gold Snafu" is a song by Australian indie rock band Sticky Fingers. It was released in February 2014 as the lead single from their second studio album Land of Pleasure.

The song was voted number 20 in the Triple J Hottest 100, 2014.

In 2025, the song was certified 2× platinum by the Australian Recording Industry Association (ARIA).

== Charts ==
Weekly chart performance for "Gold Snafu"
Chart (2014)	Peak position
Australia (ARIA)	90

== Certifications ==
Certifications for "Gold Snafu"
Region	Certification	Certified units/sales
Australia (ARIA)	2× Platinum	140,000^{‡}
New Zealand (RMNZ)	3× Platinum	90,000^{‡}
^{‡} Sales+streaming figures based on certification alone.
