= Lisi =

Lisi may refer to:

== People ==
- Lisi (rapper), Australian rapper, born Talisi or Tahlis Poasa

=== Surname ===
- Antony Garrett Lisi (born 1968), American theoretical physicist
- Ben de Lisi (born 1955), American fashion designer
- Joe Lisi (born 1950), American actor
- Mark Lisi (born 1977), American soccer player
- Mary M. Lisi (born 1950), American Senior Judge
- Riccardo Galeazzi-Lisi (1891–1968), Italian medical charlatan
- Rick Lisi (born 1956), Canadian baseball player
- Virna Lisi (1937-2014), Italian film actress
- Wang Lisi (1991), Chinese footballer
- Zyber Lisi (born 1919), former Albanian football player

=== Given name ===
- Lisi Harrison (born 1976), Canadian author
- Lisi Raskin (born 1974), American artist

=== Ethnic groups ===
- Lisi people, a collective term for three Chadian ethnic groups

== Places ==
- Lisi, Iran, a village in Mazandaran Province, Iran
- Lisi Lake, Tbilisi, Georgia

== Other uses ==
- Lisi, the city goddess at Sumerian Abu Salabikh
