= Australia Street =

Single by Sticky Fingers

from the album Caress Your Soul
- Released: 12 February 2013
- Genre: Indie rock; Reggae rock
- Length: 3:39
- Label: Sureshaker
- Songwriters: Dylan Frost; Paddy Cornwall; Seamus Coyle; Beaker Best; Freddy Crabs; Taras Hrubyj-Piper
- Producers: Dann Hume; Dylan Adams; Paddy Cornwall

Sticky Fingers singles chronology
"Clouds & Cream" (2012)	"Australia Street" (2013)	"How to Fly" (2013)

"Australia Street" is a song by Australian indie rock band Sticky Fingers from their debut studio album, Caress Your Soul (2013). It was released through Sureshaker Music on 12 February 2013 as the third single from the album.

The track's legacy has grown over the proceeding decade, evidenced by its position in multiple Triple J Hottest 100 listener-voted polls, and it can now be considered the band's signature song. It was voted at #70 in the 2013 Hottest 100, #15 in 2020's Hottest 100 of the Decade, and #62 in 2025's Hottest 100 of Australian Songs.

== Inspiration and development ==
The genesis of the song came from two different original compositions which the band merged together. In a 2014 interview with music blog Earthboy Press, bassist Paddy Cornwall explained how the "killer verse" was taken from one of frontman Dylan Frost's works, while the chorus came from Cornwall's own writing. "We decided to slam the two sections up next to each other and it just so happened to work perfectly," he said.

In March 2024, Cornwall, lead guitarist Seamus Coyle and co-producer Dann Hume reminisced about the production timeline of the song on the band's Big Boppa Podcast as part of their Caress Your Soul ten-year anniversary special episode. Cornwall explained that "Australia Street" and closing track "Freddy Crabs" (originally known by the title "Loveless Face") "used to be the same song". The band employed a number of mashup writing techniques during that period, and Cornwall confirmed on the same episode that the band's combination of the former "Loveless Face" chorus into the verse of "Australia Street" was the first instance of such a tactic.

Coyle had previously chosen "Australia Street" as the singular song to define the band when interviewed by music blog Cool Try (Bro) in the week following the release of Caress Your Soul. "It's a song about a friend's house we all used to party at in Newtown, Sydney... 'Australia Street' really captures our sound of what I like to call 'rude boy rebel rock'," Coyle said.

The titular street was home to one of the band's first defining moments, when in November 2010 they "unofficially" headlined the local Newtown Festival atop a makeshift stage of 500 milk crates in the backyard of a house on Australia Street, Newtown. "It was a time when we really started to swing into gear as a band," Coyle said in the same interview. "We played a sweet-ass guerilla gig from the backyard which we made into a film clip (the band's 2010 single "Headlock") and also went on our first tour around that time."

== Release ==
The song was premiered on Australian radio station Triple J on the day of its release, and was officially released on YouTube later that evening as part of a one-shot music video filmed on King Street, Newtown. The band's record label, Sureshaker, then uploaded the song to SoundCloud on 22 February ahead of its wider release via the Caress Your Soul album on 6 March. It was added to spot rotation on Triple J on 13 February, the day after its premiere, and full rotation on 7 March. It also landed in tenth position on the list of Australian radio's most added songs for the week commencing 11 March 2013.

== Music video ==
The release of the song's music video coincided with the release of the song itself, late on the evening of 12 February 2013. Motivated by the one-shot filming techniques utilised by Martin Scorsese in Goodfellas, the band were filmed performing the song down King Street, Newtown in one take, with friends in tow behind them. The video was shot by Colin Lucas and Tyson Perkins and produced by Cornwall. The film's one-shot concept was inspired by Patrick Townsend, who directed and edited the clip for 2012 single "Caress Your Soull". The band recruited extras for the clip by offering "free booze" in Camperdown Park as reimbursement for their time. It garnered approximately 15,000 views in its first week online; as of July 2025, that figure is now at more than 37 million views.

The video received renewed interest the following year in June 2014 after British band Coldplay was accused of stealing the concept in the clip for their single "A Sky Full of Stars". Lead singer Chris Martin traversed the same stretch of King Street, performing his song in front of a swarm of following fans, albeit on the other side of the road. While newspaper headlines highlighted Cornwall's labelling of Coldplay fans as "dorks" that "don't know how to live in the moment or have real-time fun", the band was ultimately nonplussed by the comparisons. "We are not bitter," Cornwall said in an interview with The Sydney Morning Herald. "If they (Coldplay) did copy ours, we are flattered and we are glad to see they got some love for Newtown because it is a cool place." Speaking to Australian street press publication The Music, Cornwall explained, "I got off a plane from Melbourne and I got a bunch of messages from people saying, 'Old mate Chris Martin has copied your clip'... It's probably a coincidence, you'd have to ask Chris Martin that."

Cornwall admitted the following month in a separate feature interview with The Music that the band "knew it was very obvious that it was a coincidence". They were convinced by then-manager Neal Hunt to capitalise on the publicity that could be brought forth by the similarities in the videos, with Hunt reportedly saying, "You've got to do something, it's too good".

== Personnel ==
According to credits listed on Apple Music and the CD liner notes:

- Dylan Frost – lead vocals, guitar, songwriting
- Paddy Cornwall – bass, vocals, songwriting, co-production
- Seamus Coyle – lead guitar, songwriting
- Beaker Best – drums, percussion, songwriting
- Freddy Crabs – keyboards, songwriting
- Taras Hrubyj-Piper – songwriting
- Dann Hume – mixing, co-production
- Dylan Adams – co-production
- Adam Dempsey – mastering

== Certifications ==
Region	Certification	Certified units/sales
Australia (ARIA)	2× Platinum	140,000^{‡}
New Zealand (RMNZ)	4× Platinum	120,000^{‡}
^{‡} Sales+streaming figures based on certification alone.
