= APRA Music Awards of 2022 =

40th annual APRA music awards

- Date: 3 May 2022
- Location: Melbourne Town Hall, Australia
- Hosted by: Julia Zemiro and Jerome Farah

Highlights
- Most nominations: The Kid LAROI (4)
- Website: apraamcos.com.au/awards/

The APRA Music Awards of 2022 are the 40th annual series, known as the APRA Awards. The awards are given in a series of categories in three divisions and in separate ceremonies throughout the year: the APRA Music Awards, Art Music Awards and Screen Music Awards. The APRA Music Awards are provided by APRA AMCOS (Australasian Performing Right Association and Australasian Mechanical Copyright Owners Society) and celebrate excellence in contemporary music, honouring songwriters and publishers that have achieved artistic excellence and outstanding success in their fields.

On 3 February 2022, the 20-song longlist for the APRA Song of the Year was announced. The full list of nominees for the 2022 APRA Music Awards were revealed on 7 April. Winners were announced on 3 May 2022. The Art Music Awards are sponsored by APRA AMCOS and Australian Music Centre (AMC). They were presented on 31 August at the Meat Market, North Melbourne with the finalists announced on 26 July. Screen Music Awards are jointly presented by APRA AMCOS and Australian Guild of Screen Composers (AGSC) to "acknowledge excellence and innovation in the field of screen composition." The ceremony was held on 15 November 2022 at the Forum, Melbourne.

== APRA Music Awards ==
=== Ted Albert Award for Outstanding Services to Australian Music ===
- The Wiggles

=== APRA Song of the Year ===
Title and/or artist	Writer(s)	Publisher(s)	Result	Ref.
"First Nation" by Midnight Oil featuring Jessica Mauboy & Tasman Keith	Rob Hirst and Tasman Keith	Sony Music Publishing, SFM Publishing	Nominated	
"Guided by Angels" by Amyl and the Sniffers	Fergus Romer, Amy Taylor, Bryce Wilson	—N/a	Nominated	
"Red Room" by Hiatus Kaiyote	Paul Bender, Simon Mavin, Perrin Moss, Naomi Saalfield	Universal Music Publishing	Nominated	
"Stay" by The Kid LAROI & Justin Bieber	The Kid LAROI, Justin Bieber, Isaac De Boni, Omer Fedi, Magnus Hoiberg, Michael Mule, Charlie Puth, Subhaan Rahman, Blake Slatkin	Sony Music Publishing, Universal/MCA Music Publishing, Warner Chappell Music, Kobalt Music Publishing, Native Tongue Music Publishing	Won	
"The Other Black Dog" by Genesis Owusu	Genesis Owusu, Michael Di Francesco, Andrew Klippel, Julian Sudek	Kobalt Music Publishing o.b.o. Ourness Song, Future Classic, Ourness Songs	Nominated	

=== Breakthrough Songwriter of the Year ===
Writer(s)	Publisher(s)	Result	Ref.
Budjerah Slabb	Mushroom Music	Nominated	
Genesis Owusu	Kobalt Music Publishing o.b.o. Ourness Songs	Won	
Khaled Rohaim	Universal Music Publishing / BMG	Nominated	
Tyron Hapi & Harry Michael pka Masked Wolf	BMG / Warner Chappell Music	Nominated	
Sycco	Sony Music Publishing	Nominated	

=== Most Performed Australian Work ===
Title and/or artist	Writer(s)	Publisher(s)	Result	Ref.
"Fly Away" by Tones and I	Toni Watson	Kobalt Music Publishing	Nominated	
"Head & Heart" by Joel Corry featuring MNEK	Jonathan Courtidis, Joel Corry, Uzoechi Emenike, Neve Applebaum, Daniel Dare, Robert Harvey, Kashif Siddiqui, Lewis Thompson	Universal Music Publishing, Warner Chappell Music, Mushroom Music, Kobalt Music Publishing, Sony Music Publishing	Won	
"Love on Display" by Guy Sebastian	Guy Sebastian, Julian Bunetta, Ian Franzino, Andrew Haas, John Ryan	Universal Music Publishing, Mushroom Music	Nominated	
"Missing Piece" by Vance Joy	James Keogh pka Vance Joy, Joel Little	Mushroom Music o.b.o. WAU Publishing, Sony Music Publishing	Nominated	
"Without You" by the Kid LAROI	The Kid LAROI, Omer Fedi, Blake Slatkin, Billy Walsh	Sony Music Publishing, Universal/MCA Music Publishing	Nominated	

=== Most Performed Australian Work Overseas ===
Writer(s)	Publisher(s)	Result	Ref.
Toni Watson (p.k.a. Tones and I) for "Dance Monkey"		Won	

=== Most Performed Alternative Work ===
Title and/or artist	Writer(s)	Publisher(s)	Result	Ref.
"C'mon" by Amy Shark featuring Travis Barker	Amy Shark, Travis Barker	Mushroom Music, BMG	Nominated	
"Falling Up" by Dean Lewis	Dean Lewis, Thomas Barnes, Hayden Calnin, Peter Kelleher, Benjamin Kohn, Phil Plested	Kobalt Music Publishing, Gaga Music, BMG, Sony Music Publishing	Nominated	
"Masterpiece" by The Rubens	Scott Baldwin, Elliott Margin, Zac Margin, Samuel Margin, William Zeglis	Mushroom Music	Nominated	
"Missing Piece" by Vance Joy	James Keogh (p.k.a. Vance Joy), Joel Little	Mushroom Music o.b.o. WAU Publishing, Sony Music Publishing	Won	
"Reality Check Please" by Lime Cordiale	Louis Leimbach, Oliver Leimbach, David Haddad	Universal Music Publishing, Kobalt Music Publishing	Nominated	

=== Most Performed Blues & Roots Work ===
Title and/or artist	Writer(s)	Publisher(s)	Result	Ref.
"Catch Me" by Robbie Miller	Robbie Miller	—N/a	Nominated	
"Hungry Heart" by Josh Teskey & Ash Grunwald	Josh Teskey, Ash Grunwald	Mushroom Music	Nominated	
"Letting Go" by Ziggy Alberts	Ziggy Alberts	Kobalt Music Publishing	Won	
"Power Without Greed" by The Bamboos	Kylie Auldist, Lance Ferguson	BMG	Nominated	
"Stoney Creek" by Xavier Rudd	Xavier Rudd	Sony Music Publishing	Nominated	

=== Most Performed Country Work ===
Title and/or artist	Writer(s)	Publisher(s)	Result	Ref.
"Breakups" by Seaforth (band)	Cameron Bedell, Thomas Jordan, Liz Rose, Mitchell Thompson	Warner Chappell Music	Nominated	
"Come Turn Me On" by Casey Barnes	Casey Barnes, Kaci Brown, Samuel Gray	Mushroom Music, Kobalt Music Publishing	Nominated	
"Dig" by Fanny Lumsden	Fanny Lumsden, Benjamin Corbett, Dan Freeman	Cooking Vinyl Publishing	Nominated	
"Love Songs Ain't for Us" by Amy Shark featuring Keith Urban	Amy Shark, Ed Sheeran	Mushroom Music, Sony Music Publishing	Won	
"Short Lived Love" by Brad Cox	Brad Cox	Sony Music Publishing	Nominated	

=== Most Performed Dance/Electronic Work ===
Title and/or artist	Writer(s)	Publisher(s)	Result	Ref.
"Get on the Beers" by Mashd N Kutcher featuring Dan Andrews	Mashd N Kutcher, Dan Andrews	BMG	Nominated	
"Head & Heart" by Joel Corry & MNEK	Jonathan Courtidis, Neav Applebaum, Joel Corry, Daniel Dare, Robert Harvey, MNEK, Kasif Siddiqui, Lewis Thompson	Sony Music Publishing, Universal Music Publishing, Mushroom Music o.b.o. Minds on Fire, Warner Chappell Music, Kobalt Music Publishing	Won	
"Let's Love" by David Guetta and Sia	Sia Furler, David Guetta, Giorgio Tuinfort, Marcus van Wattum	Sony Music Publishing, Origin Music Publishing	Nominated	
"Nothing to Love About Love" by Peking Duk & The Wombats	Adam Hyde, Matthew Murphy, Reuben Styles-Richards, Tyler Spry	BMG, Kobalt Music Publishing	Nominated	
"River" by PNAU & Ladyhawke	Phillipa Brown, Nick Littlemore, Sam Littlemore, Peter Mayes	BMG, 120 Music Publishing	Nominated	

=== Most Performed Hip Hop / Rap Work ===
Title and/or artist	Writer(s)	Publisher(s)	Result	Ref.
"Loyalty" by HP Boyz	Samoa Fune, Nepomsein Irakunda, Savelio Mika, Augustino Taito	—N/a	Nominated	
"My City" by OneFour & The Kid LAROI	Isaac De Boni, Spencer Magalogo, Jerome Misa, Michael Mule, Subhaan Rahman, Khaled Rohaim, The Kid LAROI, Solo Tohi, Willie Tafa, Keanu Torres	Sony Music Publishing, Warner Chappell Music, Universal/MCA Music Publishing	Nominated	
"Send It!" by Hooligan Hefs	Kiril Ivanovski, Simeona Malagamaalii	BMG, Mushroom Music	Nominated	
"Stand for" by ChillinIT featuring Lisi	Benjamin Sutton, Blake Turnell, Rilind Kocinaj, Tahlis Poasa	Sony Music Publishing, Mushroom Music	Nominated	
"Without You" by the Kid LAROI	The Kid LAROI, Omer Fedi, Blake Slatkin, Billy Walsh	Sony Music Publishing, Universal/MCA Music Publishing	Won	

=== Most Performed Pop Work ===
Title and/or artist	Writer(s)	Publisher(s)	Result	Ref.
"Dramatic" by Cat & Calmell	Cat Stratton, Calmell Teagle, Andrew Hopkins	Universal Music Publishing	Nominated	
"Fly Away" by Tones and I	Toni Watson (p.k.a. Tones and I)	Kobalt Music Publishing	Won	
"Josh by Peach PRC	Sharlee Curnow, Liam Quinn	Kobalt Music Publishing	Nominated	
"Love on Display" by Guy Sebastian	Guy Sebastian, Julian Bunetta, Ian Franzino, Andrew Haas, John Ryan	Universal Music Publishing, Mushroom Music	Nominated	
"You" by Benny Blanco, Marshmello & Vance Joy	Vance Joy, Benny Blanco, Marshmello, Caroline Pennell, Blake Slatkin	Mushroom Music o.b.o. WAU Publishing, Universal/MCA Music Publishing, Kobalt Music Publishing	Nominated	

=== Most Performed R&B / Soul Work ===
Title and/or artist	Writer(s)	Publisher(s)	Result	Ref.
"Higher" by Budjerah	Matt Corby, Budjerah Slabb	Sony Music Publishing, Mushroom Music	Won	
"How" by Youngn Lipz	Filipo Faaoloii, Peter Klappas	—N/a	Nominated	
"Made for Silence" by Miiesha	Miiesha Young, Lucian Blomkamp, Stephen Collins, Jordan Panasewych	Sony Music Publishing, BMG	Nominated	
"Please U" by Becca Hatch	Becca Hatch, Isaia Atoni, Jakiel Fuimaono, Jamie Muscat, Edward Tafa, Willie Tafa, Solo Tohi	Universal Music Publishing, Sony Music Publishing	Nominated	
"Vibrate" by Jerome Farah	Jerome Farah	Mushroom Music	Nominated	

=== Most Performed Rock Work ===
Title and/or artist	Writer(s)	Publisher(s)	Result	Ref.
"Flesh and Blood" by Jimmy Barnes	Jimmy Barnes, Mark Lizotte	Sony Music Publishing, Mushroom Music	Nominated	
"Lots of Nothing" by Spacey Jane	Ashton Hardman-Le Cornu, Caleb Harper, Kieran Lama, Peppa Lane	Kobalt Music Publishing o.b.o. Dew Process	Nominated	
"Shot in the Dark" by AC/DC	Angus Young, Malcolm Young	Sony Music Publishing o.b.o. Australian Music Corporation	Won	
"The Angel of 8th Avenue" by Gang of Youths	Dominik Borzestowski, Maxwell Dunn, Thomas Hobden, Jung Kim, David Le'aupepe	Universal Music Publishing	Nominated	
"The Waterboy" by You Am I	Tim Rogers	Universal Music Publishing	Nominated	

=== Most Performed International Work ===
Title and/or artist	Writer(s)	Publisher(s)	Result	Ref.
"Drivers License" by Olivia Rodrigo	Olivia Rodrigo, Dan Nigro	Sony Music Publishing	Nominated	
"Lasting Lover" by Sigala and James Arthur	James Arthur, Bruce Fielder, Lewis Capaldi, Luke Fitton, Ben Goldwasser, Jarl Hasselquist, Corey Sanders, Andrew VanWyngarden	Universal Music Publishing, Sony Music Publishing, BMG, Kobalt Music Publishing	Won	
"Montero (Call Me by Your Name)" by Lil Nas X	Montero Hill, Denzel Baptiste, David Biral, Omer Fedi, Rosario Lenzo	Sony Music Publishing, Universal/MCA Music Publishing	Nominated	
"Take You Dancing" by Jason Derulo	Jason Derulo, Teemu Brunila, Shawn Charles, Emanuel Kiriakou, Sarah Solovay	Universal Music Publishing, Sony Music Publishing, Kobalt Music Publishing, Native Tongue Music Publishing	Nominated	
"The Business" by Tiësto	Tijs Verwest, James Bell, Julia Karlsson, Anton Rundberg	Kobalt Music Publishing, BMG, Warner Chappell Music	Nominated	

== Art Music Awards ==
=== Work of the Year: Chamber Music ===
Title	Composer / librettist	Performer	Result	Ref.
Black Summer String Quartet (An Hommage to Australia's Bushfire History)	Natalie Williams	Australian String Quartet	Nominated	
Hokusai Mixtape	Tristan Coelho	Jonathan Henderson, James Wannan, Emily Granger, Tristan Coelho	Won	
Mewl Infans	Rishin Singh	Martin Sturm	Nominated	
Threaded in Amongst the Infinite Threading	Bree van Reyk	Genevieve Lacey, Marshall McGuire	Nominated	

=== Work of the Year: Choral ===
Title	Composer / librettist	Performer	Result	Ref.
A Gathering	Anne Cawrse / Cawrse, Paul Hetherington	Adelaide Chamber Singers	Nominated	
An Australian Song Cycle	Joseph Twist / Henry Lawson, Michael Leunig, Les Murray, Oodgeroo Noonuccal, A.B. Patterson, Peter Skrzynecki, Jack Twist, Judith Wright	Sydney Chamber Choir, Jem Harding (piano), Anthea Cottee (cello), Sam Allchurch (conductor)	Nominated	
"Pandemic", Movement 6 of Shadow and Hope – Cantata from Six Continents in the Age of Pandemic	Brenton Broadstock	Quartet Berlin-Tokyo, Theodor Schüz Ensemble, Philipp Amelung (artistic director)	Nominated	
Requiem	Paul Stanhope, Oodgeroo Noonuccal, Neela Nath Das, Mary Elizabeth Frye, Emily Dickinson	Sydney Chamber Choir	Won	

=== Work of the Year: Dramatic ===
Title	Composer / librettist	Performer	Result	Ref.
Fumeblind Oracle	Huw Belling / Pierce Wilcox	Jessica O'Donoghue, Jack Symonds, Sydney Chamber Opera	Nominated	
Parrwang Lifts the Sky	Deborah Cheetham	Victorian Opera, Short Black Opera	Nominated	
Poem for a Dried Up River	Jane Sheldon / Alice Oswald	Sydney Chamber Opera	Won	
The Pulse	Ekrem Eli Phoenix	Aurora (Young Adelaide Voices), Christie Anderson (conductor/vocal soloist)	Nominated	

=== Work of the Year: Electroacoustic/Sound Art ===
Title	Composer	Performer	Result	Ref.
Depth Disintegration	Sia Ahmad	Benjamin Anderson	Won	
Effigy, for Viola and Electronics	Erkki Veltheim	Erkki Veltheim	Nominated	
Undercurrent 暗涌	Carolyn Schofield, Mindy Meng Wang	Fia Fiell (Carolyn Schofield), Mindy Meng Wang	Nominated	
Very Fast & Very Far	Tim Bruniges, Julian Day, Matt McGuigan	Tim Bruniges, Julian Day, Matt McGuigan	Nominated	

=== Work of the Year: Jazz ===
Title	Composer	Performer	Result	Ref.
Grey Is Ground Album	Gian Slater	Gian Slater	Won	
Hand to Earth	Aviva Endean, Sunny Kim, Peter Knight, Daniel Wilfred, David Wilfred	Hand to Earth	Nominated	
Lost in Place	I Hold the Lion's Paw	I Hold the Lion's Paw	Nominated	
See You Round the Traps	Benjamin Shannon	Milton Man Gogh	Nominated	

=== Work of the Year: Large Ensemble ===
Title	Composer	Performer	Result	Ref.
The Rest Is Silence	Anne Cawrse	Melbourne Symphony Orchestra, Michael Pisani (cor anglais), Nicholas Carter (conductor)	Nominated	
Stratus	Olivia Davies	West Australian Symphony Orchestra, Asher Fisch (conductor)	Won	
Śūnyatā	Fiona Hill	Tasmanian Symphony Orchestra Simon Reade (conductor)	Nominated	
Symphony No. 1 Black Summer	Paul Dean	Australian World Orchestra	Nominated	

=== Performance of the Year: Jazz / Improvised Music ===
Title	Composer	Performer	Result	Ref.
Disruption! The Voice of Drums	Jeremy Rose, Simon Barker, Chloe Kim	Jeremy Rose & the Earshift Orchestra featuring Simon Barker and Chloe Kim	Won	
A Sanctuary of Quietude	Pat Jaffe, Callum Mintzis	Pat Jaffe, Callum Mintzis Ensemble	Nominated	
Love is a Temporary Madness, The Symphonic Suite	Vanessa Perica	Vanessa Perica Orchestra, Melbourne Symphony Orchestra, Benjamin Northey (conductor)	Nominated	
ZÖJ Live at Melbourne Recital Centre	Gelareh Pour, Brian O'Dwyer	ZÖJ	Nominated	

=== Performance of the Year: Notated Composition ===
Title	Composer / librettist	Performer	Result	Ref.
Hymns for End Times	Rachael Dease	Rachael Dease and the Western Australian Symphony Orchestra with Voyces	Nominated	
Machine Codes	Paul Stanhope	Andrew Haveron, Simon Tedeschi	Nominated	
Tipping Point	Felicity Wilcox	Andrew Blanch and Ensemble Offspring	Nominated	
WATA	Paul Grabowsky, Daniel Wilfred, David Wilfred	Melbourne Symphony Orchestra, Australian Art Orchestra, Paul Grabowsky, Daniel Wilfred, David Wilfred, Benjamin Northey (conductor)	Won	

=== Award for Excellence in Music Education ===
Organisation / individual	Work	Result	Ref.
Honeybee Creative	Teaching neurologically diverse people music skills, song writing and recording projects, in the Sunshine Coast and Gympie regions of Queensland, culminating in a number of major public performances	Won	
Musica Viva	Musica Viva in Schools	Nominated	
Speak Percussion	Sounds Unheard	Nominated	
Tim Nikolsky	Activity - leadership, connecting, contribution	Nominated	

=== Award for Excellence in Experimental Music ===
Organisation / individual	Work	Result	Ref.
ADSR Zine	2021 activities including exhibition, showcase and online catalogue of publications	Won	
Hand to Earth	Composition, recording, release, and performance of new music	Nominated	
Melbourne Electronic Sound Studio (MESS)	Education, engagement, facilitation	Nominated	
Madeleine Flynn, Tim Humphrey	Ongoing project Witness Stand	Nominated	

=== Richard Gill Award for Distinguished Services to Australian Music ===
Organisation / individual	Result	Ref.
Nigel Butterley	Won	

=== Luminary Award: Individual (National) ===
Individual	Work	Result	Ref.
Liza Lim	Music Composition, Composing Women Program	Won	

=== Luminary Award: Organisation (National) ===
Organisation	Work	Result	Ref.
Australian Art Orchestra	Sustained Leadership and Contribution as an Organisation, Recording, Performing, and Facilitating Opportunities for Others	Won	

=== Luminary Award: State & Territory Awards ===
Organisation	Work	Result	Ref.
Canberra Symphony Orchestra (Australian Capital Territory)	Australian Series	Won	
Claire Edwards (New South Wales)	2021 Activities	Won	
Kieran Welch (Queensland)	Sustained Contribution to the Creative Music Culture of Brisbane as a Performer and Artistic Director of Dots+Loops	Won	
Mark Ferguson (South Australia)	Sustained Contribution to the Fields of Education, Jazz Performance, and Composition	Won	
Simon Reade (Tasmania)	Conducting	Won	
Andrea Keller (Victoria)	Projects, Recordings and Mentorship Activities	Won	
Mace Francis (Western Australia)	Work as Artistic Director, Composer and Band Leader	Won	
Claire Kilgariff (Northern Territory)	Artistic Director of Arafura Music Collective	Won	

== Screen Music Awards ==
=== Feature Film Score of the Year ===
Title	Composer	Result	Ref.
Bosch and Rockit	Brian Cachia	Nominated	
The Drover's Wife: The Legend of Molly Johnson	Sallianna Seven Campbell	Won	
Interceptor	Michael Lira	Nominated	
A Stitch in Time	Angela Little	Nominated	

=== Best Music for an Advertisement ===
Title	Composer	Result	Ref.
Ausfilm: "The Australian Job"	Angela Little	Nominated	
Destination NSW: "Feel New"	Lance Gurisik	Won	
Ostelin: "Strong Women"	Ack Kinmonth	Nominated	
Samsung MFF: "Walk the Night"	Nicholas Routledge, Joshua Pearson, Jono Ma	Nominated	

=== Best Music for Children's Programming ===
Title	Composer	Result	Ref.
The Deep	Nerida Tyson-Chew	Won	
Destroy the Invisibility Jacket	Joseph Twist	Nominated	
Space Nova: "Dark Ice"	Russell Thornton	Nominated	
The Bureau of Magical Things	Brett Aplin	Nominated	

=== Best Music for a Documentary ===
Title	Composer	Result	Ref.
A Fire Inside	Matteo Zingales	Nominated	
Ms Represented with Annabel Crabb	Andrew Scott, Caitlin Yeo	Nominated	
No Mercy, No Remorse	Brett Alpin	Nominated	
Puff: Wonders of the Reef	Hylton Mowday	Won	

=== Best Music for a Mini-Series or Telemovie ===
Title	Composer	Result	Ref.
Books that Made Us	Jackson Milas	Nominated	
New Gold Mountain	Caitlin Yeo	Won	
The Twelve	Rafael May	Nominated	
Underbelly: Vanishing Act	Amanda Brown	Nominated	

=== Best Music for a Short Film ===
Title	Composer	Result	Ref.
Bellysaurus	Dmitri Golovko	Nominated	
Finding X	Cassie To	Nominated	
Still Life	Wil Hughes	Won	
Tarneit	Nerida Tyson-Chew	Nominated	

=== Best Music for a Television Series or Serial ===
Series or Serial	Composer	Result	Ref.
Blindspotting	Michael Yezerski, Ambrose Akinmusire	Nominated	
RFDS	Amanda Brown	Nominated	
The Newsreader	Cornel Wilczek	Nominated	
Total Control	Antony Partos, Matteo Zingales	Won	

=== Best Original Song Composed for the Screen ===
Song title	Work	Composer	Result	Ref.
"Bloody Game"	Total Control	Missy Higgins	Nominated	
"I Am My Own Panther Now"	Preppers	Kate Miller-Heidke, Keir Nuttall	Nominated	
"Silver Linings"	Mumlife	Sophia Christopher	Nominated	
"Spirit Voice of the Enchanted Waters"	River	William Barton, Piers Burbrook de Vere, Richard Tognetti	Won	

=== Best Soundtrack Album ===
Title	Composer	Result	Ref.
New Gold Mountain	Caitlin Yeo	Nominated	
No Mercy, No Remorse	Brett Aplin	Nominated	
River	Richard Tognetti, William Barton, Piers Burbrook de Vere	Won	
Wolf Like Me	Piers Burbrook de Vere	Nominated	

=== Best Television Theme ===
Title	Composer	Result	Ref.
Books that Made Us	Jackson Milas	Nominated	
New Gold Mountain	Caitlin Yeo	Won	
The PM's Daughter	Basil Hogios, Caitlin Yeo	Nominated	
Troppo	Josh Pyke	Nominated	

=== Most Performed Screen Composer – Australia ===
Composer	Result	Ref.
Adam Gock, Dinesh Wicks	Won	
Damian de Boos Smith	Nominated	
Jay Stewart	Nominated	
Mitch Stewart	Nominated	

=== Most Performed Screen Composer – Overseas ===
Composer	Result	Ref.
Adam Gock, Dinesh Wicks	Nominated	
Alastair Ford	Nominated	
Joff Bush	Nominated	
Neil Sutherland	Won	

=== Distinguished Services to the Australian Screen ===
Organisation / individual	Result	Ref.
Nigel Westlake	awarded	
