= Land of Pleasure =

Studio album by Sticky Fingers
- Released: 1 August 2014
- Length: 46:55
- Label: Sureshaker
- Producer: Dann Hume

Sticky Fingers chronology
Caress Your Soul (2013)	Land of Pleasure (2014)	Westway (The Glitter & the Slums) (2016)

Singles from Land of Pleasure
- 1. "Gold Snafu" Released: February 2014; 2. "Just for You" Released: June 2014; 3. "Rum Rage" Released: 1 August 2014

Land of Pleasure is the second studio album by Australian rock band Sticky Fingers, released through Sureshaker in August 2014. Land of Pleasure debuted at number 3 on the ARIA Charts.

== Reception ==
Shane Arnold from Music Feeds said the album was "Slicker and more cohesive than Caress Your Soul" and called the album "a simply delicious mix of rock, reggae and electronica". Ben Madden from Project U called the album "excellent" saying "All the songs on this album belong, and while not being as fluid as Caress Your Soul, it surpasses the aforementioned album in terms of sheer musical quality. Each track screams for attention, and even the laidback tracks such as 'Feast Your Eyes' pack a little more punch than the relaxed tracks on the debut".

Arne Sjostedt from Sydney Morning Herald gave the album 4/5 saying "There are some very satisfying grooves on this album. Playing a mix of sounds that settle around dub reggae, a little psychedelia and hints at electro, these lads show up to the party."

== Track listing ==
1. "Land of Pleasure" – 3:01
2. "Feast Your Eyes" – 2:34
3. "Just for You" – 3:50
4. "Rum Rage" – 4:12
5. "Gold Snafu" – 3:39
6. "Liquorlip Loaded Gun" – 5:09
7. "Fake a Smile" – 2:15
8. "Show No Shade" – 3:40
9. "If You Go" – 3:47
10. "Velvet Skies" (featuring Lyall Moloney) – 4:49
11. "Dreamland" – 4:05
12. "Lazerhead" – 5:54
13. "Gasoline Can Man" (bonus track) – 1:52

== Charts ==
Chart (2014)	Peak position
Australian Albums (ARIA)	3

== Certifications ==
Region	Certification	Certified units/sales
Australia (ARIA)	Gold	35,000^{‡}
New Zealand (RMNZ)	3× Platinum	45,000^{‡}
^{‡} Sales+streaming figures based on certification alone.

== Release history ==
Country	Date	Format	Label	Catalogue
Australia / New Zealand	August 2014	Digital download, CD	Sureshaker Music	CW015
Netherlands	2014	digital download, CD	Goomah Music	GoomahCD50
