= Westway (The Glitter & the Slums) =

Studio album by Sticky Fingers
- Released: 30 September 2016
- Recorded: January – February 2016
- Studios: Karma Sound Studios; Bang Saray, Thailand and Sydney, Australia
- Length: 39:36
- Label: Sureshaker
- Producer: Dann Hume

Sticky Fingers chronology
Land of Pleasure (2014)	Westway (The Glitter & the Slums) (2016)	Yours to Keep (2019)

Singles from Westway (The Glitter & the Slums)
- 1. "Outcast at Last" Released: 23 March 2016; 2. "Our Town" Released: July 2016; 3. "Sad Songs" Released: November 2016

Westway (The Glitter & the Slums) is the third studio album by Australian rock band Sticky Fingers, released through Sureshaker on 30 September 2016. It was produced by Dann Hume, who produced the band's second album, Land of Pleasure, and co-produced their debut album Caress Your Soul. Westway (The Glitter & the Slums) debuted at number 1 on the Australian Albums Chart, making it the band's first number 1 album in Australia.

The album's release was preceded by the first single "Outcast at Last" in March 2016, the second single "Our Town" in July 2016 and the third single "Sad Songs" November 2016.

At the J Awards of 2016, the album was nominated for Australian Album of the Year.

== Recording and production ==
Dann Hume returned to produce the album after producing the band's second album Land of Pleasure and co-producing debut album Caress Your Soul. Hume had also previously produced albums for Lisa Mitchell, Snakadaktal and Matt Corby. According to lead guitarist Seamus Coyle the band chose to work with Hume again because of their longtime working relationship and he "knows how to get the best" out of them. Bassist Paddy Cornwall said that Hume had become a close friend of the band and they have a comfortable working relationship with him.

The album was mostly recorded over the course of a month at Karma Sound Studios in Bang Saray, Thailand in early 2016. Frost and Cornwall wrote the lyrics of the album. Two songs, "Something Strange" featuring Australian rapper Remi and "Amillionite", were recorded in Sydney. "Something Strange" was recorded in Sydney because the band invited Remi to collaborate on the song when he came to them to borrow a drum kit while he was visiting Sydney.

== Track listing ==
All songs written by Sticky Fingers (Daniel Neurath, Dylan Frost, Eric da Silva Gruener, Paddy Cornwall & Seamus Coyle) unless noted.

No.	Title	Writer(s)	Length
1.	"One by One"		3:53
2.	"Outcast at Last"		2:32
3.	"Sad Songs"		3:23
4.	"Angel"		3:57
5.	"Our Town"	Dann Hume; Frost; Neurath; da Silva Gruener; Cornwall; Coyle	3:14
6.	"Westway"	Hume; Frost; Neurath; da Silva Gruener; Cornwall; Coyle	3:25
7.	"Something Strange"	Neurath; Frost; da Silva Gruener; Cornwall; Remi Kolawole; Coyle; Taras Hrubyj-Piper	3:39
8.	"Flight 101"	Hume; Frost; Neurath; da Silva Gruener; Cornwall; Coyle	3:48
9.	"Tongue & Cheek"		3:28
10.	"Amillionite"	Frost; Neurath; da Silva Gruener; Cornwall; Coyle; Hrubyj-Piper	3:25
11.	"No Divide"		4:52
Total length:			39:36

== Personnel ==
Sticky Fingers

- Dylan Frost – lead vocals, rhythm guitar
- Paddy Cornwall – bass, backing vocals
- Seamus Coyle – lead guitar
- Eric "Beaker Best" da Silva Gruener – drums, percussion
- Daniel "Freddy Crabs" Neurath – keyboards, synthesisers

Additional musicians

- Remi Kolawole – co-lead vocals on "Something Strange"

== Charts ==
=== Weekly charts ===
Chart (2016)	Peak position
Australian Albums (ARIA)	1
New Zealand Albums (RMNZ)	4

=== Year-end charts ===
Chart (2016)	Position
Australian Albums (ARIA)	100

== Certifications ==
Region	Certification	Certified units/sales
Australia (ARIA)	Gold	35,000^{‡}
New Zealand (RMNZ)	Platinum	15,000^{‡}
^{‡} Sales+streaming figures based on certification alone.

== Release history ==
Country	Date	Format	Label	Catalogue
Australia	30 September 2016	Digital download, CD, LP	Sureshaker Music	SURESHAKER001 / SURESHAKER002
Japan	July 2017	digital download, CD	Inpartmaint Inc.	IPM-8074

== See also ==
- List of number-one albums of 2016 (Australia)
