= My Sunshine (song) =

2015 single by Mashd N Kutcher

Single by Mashd N Kutcher
- Released: 9 December 2015
- Length: 2:54
- Label: Parlophone
- Songwriter(s): Marc Costanzo; Gregg Diamond; Sam Littlemore

Mashd N Kutcher singles chronology
"No Way Out" (2015)	"My Sunshine" (2015)	"Pretend" (2017)

Music video
- "My Sunshine" on YouTube

"My Sunshine" is a song by Australian duo Mashd N Kutcher, released in December 2015. The song samples Len's "Steal My Sunshine".

It was the most played song on Australian radio in February 2016.

== Track listings ==
1. "My Sunshine" - 2:54

Remixes

1. "My Sunshine" (Generik remix) - 4:39
2. "My Sunshine" (Tigerlily remix) - 4:52
3. "My Sunshine" (Matt Watkins remix) - 4:15

== Charts ==
=== Weekly charts ===
Chart (2015/16)	Peak position
Australia (ARIA)	18

=== Year-end charts ===
Chart (2016)	Position
Australian Artist (ARIA)	31

== Certifications ==
Region	Certification	Certified units/sales
Australia (ARIA)	Gold	35,000^{‡}
^{‡} Sales+streaming figures based on certification alone.
