= Caress Your Soul (song) =

2012 song by Sticky Fingers

Single by Sticky Fingers

from the album Caress Your Soul
- Released: 27 July 2012
- Length: 2:53
- Label: Sureshaker

Sticky Fingers singles chronology
"Caress Your Soul" (2012)	"Clouds and Cream" (2012)

"Caress Your Soul" is a song by Australian indie rock band Sticky Fingers. It was released in July 2012 as the lead single from their debut studio album of the same name. The song peaked at number 80 on the ARIA Charts.

The song was voted number 61 in the Triple J Hottest 100, 2012.

In 2025, the song was certified platinum by the Australian Recording Industry Association (ARIA).

== Charts ==
Weekly chart performance for "Caress Your Soul"
Chart (2012)	Peak position
Australia (ARIA)	80

== Certifications ==
Certifications for "Caress Your Soul"
Region	Certification	Certified units/sales
Australia (ARIA)	Platinum	70,000^{‡}
New Zealand (RMNZ)	2× Platinum	60,000^{‡}
^{‡} Sales+streaming figures based on certification alone.
