= Get on the Beers =

2020 single by Mashd N Kutcher featuring Daniel Andrews

Single by Mashd N Kutcher featuring Daniel Andrews
- Released: 11 April 2020
- Length: 3:13
- Label: Brewery Records
- Songwriters: Mashd N Kutcher; Dan Andrews
- Producer: Mashd N Kutcher

Mashd N Kutcher singles chronology
"No One Alive" (2020)	"Get on the Beers" (2020)	"Last Resort" (2020)

"Get on the Beers" is a song by Australian music act Mashd N Kutcher featuring then–Premier of Victoria, Daniel Andrews. The song is composed from comments made by Andrews, during a press conference in March 2020, at the beginning of the COVID-19 pandemic, telling Victorians that it was not appropriate to “have all your mates around to your house to 'get on the beers'" after pubs had been shut due to COVID-19 risks. The song was uploaded onto YouTube on 3 April 2020 and officially released on 11 April 2020, featuring Elliot Loney. A version featuring Daniel Andrews was released on 26 October 2020.

In December 2020, two houses in Victoria (one each in Sandringham and Kings Park) used the song to accompany a synchronised Christmas light display. Home owner Michael Eather said "It has been a mega hit. We've had people wait about an hour for it. They rock up around 9pm and we tell them that 'Get on the Beers' is not on until 10pm. It's definitely getting a lot of laughs."

The song placed 12th on the 2020 Triple J Hottest 100 and was personally introduced by Victorian Premier Daniel Andrews.

At the APRA Music Awards of 2022, the song was nominated for Most Performed Dance/Electronic Work.

== Background ==
During a press conference on 23 March 2020, Victorian Premier Daniel Andrews cautioned people about the pandemic, saying: "You won't be able to go to the pub because the pub is shut. That doesn't mean you can have all your mates around to (your) home and get on the beers, that's not appropriate. It's not essential, it's not needed, and all it will do is spread the virus." Mashd N Kutcher used the words to create the song.

Matt James told Student Edge, "With press conferences all over the TV, that was about the only thing I could remix, so I did. It was never anything to do with politics. It was more about the message of someone who is in such a serious position saying, 'get on the beers'; it's a very Aussie thing to say." James added it "was made in about 15 minutes and posted without much thought."

The video of the remix was uploaded onto YouTube on 3 April 2020 featuring excerpts of Andrews' conference interjected with words by U.S. President Donald Trump. The single was officially released on 11 April 2020, with Elliot Loney re-recording Andrews and Trump’s words. Within days, "get on the beers" was said to have become a household phrase in Australia, and became "somewhat of an anthem" during the mid-2020 lockdown in Melbourne. James believes the song has become an anthem because "it's giving people a fun and light-hearted sort of entertainment."

In a press conference on 26 October 2020, Andrews announced that Victoria had recorded zero local COVID-19 cases for the first time since 9 June. During the press conference, Andrews was asked by Seven News reporter Sharnelle Vella whether he'd be "getting on the beers", to which Andrews responded "I don't know that I'll be drinking a beer tonight; I might go a little higher up the shelf."

The song was re-released on 26 October 2020 after Andrews' announcement of eased restrictions, which saw pubs, restaurants, retailers and cafes open up again. This version featured Andrews' words from the March press conference. The song debuted at number 1 on the Australian Independent Record Labels Association singles chart for the week commencing 9 November 2020.

== Credits and personnel ==
=== Elliot Loney version ===
Credits adapted from Spotify.

Mashd N Kutcher

- Mashd N Kutcher – writing, production

Additional personnel

- Elliot Loney – vocals, writing

=== Dan Andrews version ===
Credits adapted from Spotify.

Mashd N Kutcher

- Mashd N Kutcher – writing, production

Additional personnel

- Dan Andrews – vocals, writing

== Charts ==
Chart performance for "Get on the Beers"
Chart (2020–2021)	Peak position
Australia (ARIA)	39
Australian Independent Singles (AIR)	1

== Certifications ==
Region	Certification	Certified units/sales
Australia (ARIA)	Gold	35,000^{‡}
^{‡} Sales+streaming figures based on certification alone.

== Release history ==
Region	Date	Format	Label	Version
Various	11 April 2020	Digital download, streaming	Brewery Records	Elliot Loney version
Various	26 October 2020	Digital download, streaming	Brewery Records	Daniel Andrews version
