= Sticky Fingers (band) =

Australian indie/reggae rock band

- Origin: Sydney, New South Wales, Australia
- Genres: Indie rock; reggae rock; reggae fusion; psychedelic rock; soul
- Years active: 2008–2016; 2018–2023; 2025–present
- Label: SureShaker
- Members: Paddy Cornwall; Seamus Coyle; Eric da Silva Gruener (p.k.a. "Beaker Best"); Daniel Neurath (p.k.a. "Freddy Crabs"); Claude Bailey
- Past members: Taras Hrubyj-Piper; Dylan Frost
- Website: stickyfingerstheband.com

Sticky Fingers are an Australian rock band formed in 2008 in Sydney. The band consists of Claude Bailey (lead vocals, rhythm guitar), Paddy Cornwall (bass, backing vocals), Seamus Coyle (lead guitar), Beaker Best (drums, percussion) and Freddy Crabs (keyboards, synthesizer). Former band member Taras Hrubyj-Piper (guitar/keyboards) left the band in 2009, shortly after their debut EP Helping Hand was released. Former lead singer and rhythm guitarist Dylan Frost stepped away from the band in 2025, and has since been replaced by Claude Bailey.

They have released five studio albums: Caress Your Soul (2013), Land of Pleasure (2014), Westway (The Glitter & The Slums) (2016), Yours to Keep (2019) and Lekkerboy (2022), as well as three EPs: Helping Hand (2009), Extended Play (2010), and Happy Endings (2011). Their third album was the first album to debut and appear at number 1 on the Australian Albums Chart.

On 5 December 2016, the band announced they would be going on an indefinite hiatus in February, due to several internal issues, including multiple accusations of lead singer Dylan Frost threatening and verbally abusing other musicians. On 26 March 2018, the band announced their return via their Instagram account.

== History ==
=== 2008–2012: Helping Hand, Extended Play and Happy Endings ===
The band was formed after Cornwall and Best met Frost busking outside of the Coopers Hotel in Newtown.

In 2008, Sticky Fingers played their first live show and in October 2009, released their debut EP titled Helping Hand. The EP showcases the early sound of Sticky Fingers which is mainly reggae driven, and includes the songs "Inspirational" and "Juicy Ones" which were later re-recorded for their Extended Play EP. The EP credits Taras Hrubyj-Piper for guitar and keyboard work, as well as Caroline De Dear and rapper Mute MC for vocal work on the song "Lyrical Stoka". Sticky Fingers released the Extended Play EP in October 2010 (through sureshaker), and the acoustic EP Happy Endings in October 2011.

After having their applications to play the Newtown Festival rejected on two consecutive occasions, in 2010, Sticky Fingers set up their own DIY stage in a friend's backyard nearby on the day of the festival. The renegade performance caught the attention of promoters, and notably, producer Dann Hume – who would go on to produce their next three records. Sticky Fingers went on to headline Newtown Festival the next year.

=== 2012–2015: Caress Your Soul and Land of Pleasure ===
Caress Your Soul, the band's debut album, was released in March 2013 and reached number 39 on the Australian Albums Chart. The band's second album Land of Pleasure reached number 3 on the Australian Albums Chart when it was released in August 2014.

The band not only gained popularity in Australia, but became popular in countries such as France, Germany, New Zealand, the Netherlands and the UK. The band postponed their 2015 European tour for personal reasons.

=== 2015–2018: Westway (The Glitter & the Slums) and allegations of threats ===
Their third album, Westway (The Glitter & the Slums), was mostly recorded over the course of a month in Karma Sound Studios, Bang Saray, Thailand in early 2016 and was released on 30 September 2016. Frost and Cornwall wrote the lyrics of the album and two songs, "Something Strange" featuring Australian rapper Remi and "Amillionite", were recorded in Sydney. The album debuted at number one on the Australian Albums Chart, making it the band's first number-one Australian album.

On 5 December 2016, the band announced through a Facebook post that they were going on an indefinite hiatus. Later that day, Dylan Frost posted a Facebook status on the band's page apologising for his behaviour and announcing his struggles with alcohol addiction and mental health issues. On 6 December 2016, an article published by The Sydney Morning Herald detailed further events leading to the hiatus. Frost was accused of physically threatening singer Thelma Plum after an incident at a Sydney pub where he reportedly spat on her.

=== 2018–19: Return from hiatus, world tour and Yours to Keep ===
On 26 March 2018, the band used their Instagram account to post an image of the five members together, with the caption "Look who's back", signaling a return from their hiatus. On 30 March, they played at Bad Friday, a neighborhood music festival held in Sydney's inner west.

On 13 April 2018, they released a comeback single, "Kick On", and announced a June 2018 world tour with shows in Australia, Mexico, the United States, the United Kingdom, Germany, the Netherlands, New Zealand and Indonesia. This tour included a performance at the Big Top in Luna Park Sydney.

=== 2020–present: Lekkerboy ===
Sticky Fingers released "We Can Make the World Glow", the lead single from their fifth studio album, Lekkerboy, on 24 September 2021. They followed this on 29 October with two more singles from the album, which were joined together as one release titled "Saves the Day" and "My Rush". On 20 April 2022, the band released Lekkerboy.

In October 2023, the group released a book titled Belly of the Beast: On the Road with Sticky Fingers.

== Influences ==
Bassist Paddy Cornwall has stated that Sydney ska band King Tide were a huge influence on Sticky Fingers, with the band opening for King Tide many times. Later on in their career, the band invited King Tide to open for them on their sold-out run of Enmore Theatre gigs to return the favour. The band has stated their psychedelic reggae music has also been influenced by bands such as The Clash, Pink Floyd and the Arctic Monkeys. They have described their sound as "a melting pot of reggae, psych and bourbon."

== Members ==
=== Current ===
- Paddy Cornwall – bass, backing vocals (2008–present)
- Seamus Coyle – lead guitar (2008–present)
- Eric "Beaker Best" da Silva Gruener – drums, percussion (2008–present)
- Daniel "Freddy Crabs" Neurath – keyboards, synthesizer (2009–present)
- Claude Bailey – lead vocals, rhythm guitar (2025–present)

=== Former ===
- Dylan Frost – lead vocals, rhythm guitar (2008–2025)
- Taras Hrubyj-Piper – rhythm guitar, keyboards (2008–2009)

== Discography ==
=== Studio albums ===
List of studio albums, with selected details
| Title | Details | Peak chart positions | | | Certifications |
| Title | Details | AUS | NZ | UK Vinyl | Certifications |
|---|---|---|---|---|---|
| Caress Your Soul | Released: March 2013; Label: Sureshaker Music (CW012); Formats: CD, digital download | 11 | 13 | 39 | ARIA: Platinum; RMNZ: 5× Platinum |
| Land of Pleasure | Released: August 2014; Label: Sureshaker Music (CW015); Formats: CD, digital download | 3 | — | — | ARIA: Gold; RMNZ: 3× Platinum |
| Westway (The Glitter & the Slums) | Released: October 2016; Label: SureShaker (SURESHAKER001); Formats: CD, digital download, LP | 1 | 4 | — | ARIA: Gold; RMNZ: Gold |
| Yours to Keep | Released: 8 February 2019; Label: SureShaker (SURESHAKER009); Formats: CD, digital download, LP, streaming | 4 | 5 | — | RMNZ: Platinum |
| Lekkerboy | Released: 20 April 2022; Label: Westway (WC001); Formats: CD, 2×LP, digital download, streaming | 37 | — | 29 | |

=== Compilation albums ===
List of compilation albums, with selected details
| Title | Details | Peak chart positions |
| Title | Details | AUS |
|---|---|---|
| Land of Pleasure / Caress Your Soul | Released: 17 October 2014; Label: Sureshaker (CWV015); Format: 2×LP | 77 |

=== Extended plays ===
List of extended plays, with selected details
| Title | Details | Peak chart positions |
| Title | Details | NZ |
|---|---|---|
| Helping Hand | Released: October 2009; Label: Sticky Fingers (0510569334); Format: CD | — |
| Extended Play | Released: 2010; Label: Sureshaker Music; Format: CD | — |
| Happy Endings | Released: October 2011; Label: Sureshaker Music (CW009); Format: CD | — |
| The Bootleg Tapes (Caress Your Soul) | Released: 8 March 2024; Label: Westway Collective; Format: Digital | 36 |

=== Singles ===
List of singles, with year released and album details shown
| Title | Year | Peak chart positions | | Certifications | Album |
| Title | Year | AUS | UK Vinyl | Certifications | Album |
|---|---|---|---|---|---|
| "Caress Your Soul" | 2012 | 80 | — | ARIA: Platinum; RMNZ: 2× Platinum | Caress Your Soul |
| "Clouds and Cream" | 2012 | — | — | ARIA: Platinum; RMNZ: Platinum | Caress Your Soul |
| "Australia Street" | 2013 | — | — | ARIA: 2× Platinum; RMNZ: 4× Platinum | Caress Your Soul |
| "How to Fly" | 2013 | — | — | ARIA: 2× Platinum; RMNZ: 8× Platinum | Caress Your Soul |
| "Gold Snafu" | 2014 | 90 | — | ARIA: 2× Platinum; RMNZ: 3× Platinum | Land of Pleasure |
| "Just for You" | 2014 | — | — | | Land of Pleasure |
| "Rum Rage" | 2014 | — | — | ARIA: 2× Platinum; RMNZ: 5× Platinum | Land of Pleasure |
| "Ghost Town" | 2015 | — | — | | Non-album single |
| "Outcast at Last" | 2016 | — | — | | Westway (The Glitter & the Slums) |
| "Our Town" | 2016 | 90 | — | RMNZ: Gold | Westway (The Glitter & the Slums) |
| "Sad Songs" | 2016 | — | — | | Westway (The Glitter & the Slums) |
| "Kick On" | 2018 | — | — | RMNZ: Platinum | Yours to Keep |
| "Cool & Calm" | 2018 | — | — | RMNZ: Platinum | Yours to Keep |
| "Loose Ends" | 2018 | — | — | | Yours to Keep |
| "Not Done Yet" | 2019 | — | — | RMNZ: Gold | Yours to Keep |
| "Another Episode" | 2019 | — | — | | Yours to Keep |
| "Sunsick Moon" | 2019 | — | — | | Yours to Keep |
| "Teenage Vertigo" | 2019 | — | — | | Non-album single |
| "Sleep Alone" | 2019 | — | — | | Yours to Keep |
| "Cyclone" (The Village Sessions) | 2020 | — | 2 (Note: "A Love Letter from Me to You" was released as a double-A sided vinyl single in the UK only with "Cyclone" as the flip.) | RMNZ: Platinum | Non-album singles |
| "A Love Letter from Me to You" | 2021 | — | 2 | | Non-album singles |
| "We Can Make the World Glow" | 2021 | — | — | | Lekkerboy |
| "Saves the Day" / "My Rush" | 2021 | — | — | | Lekkerboy |
| "Crooked Eyes" | 2021 | — | — | | Lekkerboy |
| "Lekkerboy" | 2022 | — | — | | Lekkerboy |
| "Multiple Facets of the Same Diamond" / "Love Song" | 2022 | — | — | | Lekkerboy |
| "Lupo the Wolf" | 2022 | — | — | | Lekkerboy |
| "Sidelines" | 2022 | — | — | | Lekkerboy (Dexlue) |
| "Waterfall" | 2023 | — | — | | Lekkerboy (Dexlue) |
| "Someone You Need" | 2023 | — | — | | Lekkerboy (Dexlue) |
| "Bullets" (DJ CEO featuring Sticky Fingers and Young Buck) | 2025 | — | — | | Non-album single |
"—" denotes a recording that did not chart or was not released in that territory.

=== Other charted and certified songs ===
| Title | Year | Peak chart positions | Certifications | Album |
| Title | Year | NZ Hot | Certifications | Album |
|---|---|---|---|---|
| "Willow Tree" | 2010 | — | RMNZ: Gold | Extended Play |
| "Happy Endings" | 2011 | — | RMNZ: Gold | Happy Endings |
| "Bootleg Rascal" | 2013 | — | ARIA: Platinum; RMNZ: 2× Platinum | Caress Your Soul |
| "Feast Your Eyes" | 2013 | — | RMNZ: Gold | Caress Your Soul |
| "Freddy Crabs" | 2013 | — | RMNZ: Gold | Caress Your Soul |
| "Kiss the Breeze" | 2013 | — | RMNZ: Platinum | Caress Your Soul |
| "Laika" | 2013 | — | RMNZ: Gold | Caress Your Soul |
| "Let It All Out" | 2013 | — | RMNZ: Gold | Caress Your Soul |
| "Sex" | 2013 | — | RMNZ: Gold | Caress Your Soul |
| "These Girls" | 2013 | — | ARIA: Platinum; RMNZ: 3× Platinum | Caress Your Soul |
| "Land of Pleasure" | 2014 | — | RMNZ: Platinum | Land of Pleasure |
| "Lazerhead" | 2014 | — | RMNZ: Platinum | Land of Pleasure |
| "Liquorlip Loaded Gun" | 2014 | — | RMNZ: Platinum | Land of Pleasure |
| "Angel" | 2016 | — | RMNZ: Gold | Westway (The Glitter & the Slums) |
| "Flight 101" | 2016 | — | RMNZ: Gold | Westway (The Glitter & the Slums) |
| "One By One" | 2016 | — | RMNZ: Gold | Westway (The Glitter & the Slums) |
| "Another Episode" | 2019 | 13 | | Yours to Keep |
| "Sleep Alone" | 2019 | 15 | | Yours to Keep |
| "Yours to Keep" | 2019 | 17 | RMNZ: Gold | Yours to Keep |
| "Sleeping Through the Flood" | 2019 | 18 | | Yours to Keep |
| "Bootleg Rascal" ('23 remix) | 2024 | 23 | | The Bootleg Tapes (Caress Your Soul) |
| "Big Mits" | 2024 | 21 | | The Bootleg Tapes (Caress Your Soul) |
| "Easily" (demo) | 2024 | 30 | | The Bootleg Tapes (Caress Your Soul) |
| "Won't Be Long" | 2024 | 27 | | The Bootleg Tapes (Caress Your Soul) |
"—" denotes a recording that did not chart or was not released in that territory.
