= Lisi (rapper) =

Australian rapper and musician

- Born: Talisi or Tahlis Poasa; 2000 or 2001; New Zealand
- Origin: Goodna, Queensland, Australia
- Genre: Australian hip hop]rap
- Occupations: Rapper; singer; songwriter
- Years active: 2019–present
- Labels: Castille Records; ADA; Warner Music Australia

Talisi or Tahlis Poasa known professionally as Lisi, is a New Zealand-born, Australian-based rapper and musician.

He lives in Goodna, Queensland and released his debut extended play Average Man in 2020 and studio album Perspective in 2021.

== Early life ==
Poasa was born in New Zealand to Samoan heritage. He and his family moved to Sydney, Australia when he was three. He grew up in Goodna, Queensland. He attended Redbank Plains State High School.

Lisi told the ABC's The Pacific program in 2023, "[Growing up] I liked listening to rap. I think I liked how it made me feel empowered, You know, the way that they paint pictures with words, really takes you into a space where you put yourself in their shoes."

As a teen, he posted videos to Instagram which gained popularity. Lisi said he was spurred on to try recording in a studio by suggestions from fans. He had saved enough money from working shifts in a factory as a machine operator to pay for time at a local studio and recorded what became his debut single, "Say Less" in 2019.

His grandmother is Ana Tuisila, played Dwayne "The Rock" Johnson's grandmother, Lia Maivia, on the show Young Rock.

== Career ==
In October 2019, Lisi released his debut single "Say Less".

In August 2020, Lisi released the extended play Average Man. The EP was recorded in his brother's bedroom, released organically, with no marketing

In October 2020, Lisi featured on Chillinit's single "Stand For", which peaked at number 54 on the ARIA Charts and was nominated for Most Performed Hip Hop/Rap Work at the APRA Music Awards of 2022.

In May 2021, Lisi co-founded the record label Castille Records with Christian Brown and signed rap collective TH4 W3ST and rapper Nokz78. "Dreams" was released in June 2021.

In November 2021, Lisi released the studio album, Perspective in conjunction with ADA/Warner Music Australia. NME said "Across its nine songs, Lisi explores his Samoan heritage, his goals as a rapper (both material and non-material) and the importance of community."

In June 2022 Lisi performed his songs alongside the 25-piece Queensland Symphony Orchestra, which he described as "history making", adding "I'm doing something new. It's a step out of my comfort zone. And I get to do music that shows you who I am – it shows what I'm about."

== Discography ==
=== Studio albums ===
List of studio albums, with release date and label shown
Title	Details
Perspective	Released: 19 November 2021; Label: Castille Records, ADA, Warner; Format: Digital download, streaming

=== Extended plays ===
List of EPs, with release date and label shown
Title	Details
Average Man	Released: 10 July 2020; Label: 1530621 DK; Format: Digital download, streaming

=== Charted and/or Certified Singles ===
List of charted and/or certified singles, with year released, selected chart positions and album name shown
Title	Year	Peak chart positions		Certification	Album
Title	Year	AUS	NZ Hot	Certification	Album
"Say Less"	2019	—	35	ARIA: Gold; RMNZ: Platinum	Non-album single
"The Come Up"	2019	—	9	RMNZ: Platinum	Non-album single
"Fist's Up" (featuring Vicc.)	2020	—	37		Non-album single
"64 Bars Home"	2020	—	28		Non-album single
"Stand For" (Chillinit featuring Lisi)	2020	54	—	ARIA: Gold	Full Circle (Chillinit album)
"Look At Me Now" (DJ Discretion featuring Lisi and Shely210)	2021	—	17	RMNZ: Gold	Non-album single
"Dreams"	2021	—	14	ARIA: Gold; RMNZ: Gold	Perspective
"Til the Death"	2021	—	21		Perspective
"Baby We On" (featuring EJ)	2021	—	10	RMNZ: Platinum	Perspective
"Pray for Me" (Melodownz featuring Lisi and Mikey Dam)	2022	—	21		Lone Wolf (Melodownz album)
"Like This" (featuring Nokz78)	2022	—	31		Non-album single
"Make It Out"	2022	—	7		Non-album single
"Olé" (featuring JR)	2023	—	17		Non-album single
"Remain the Same"	2023	—	20		Non-album single
"Fear No Man"	2024	—	25		Non-album single
"Try Me"	2025	—	35		Non-album single
"—" denotes a recording that did not chart or was not released in that territory.

== Awards and nominations ==
=== APRA Awards ===
The APRA Awards are held in Australia and New Zealand by the Australasian Performing Right Association to recognise songwriting skills, sales and airplay performance by its members annually.

Year	Nominee / work	Award	Result	Ref.
2022	"Stand for" (Chillinit featuring Lisi) (Rilind Kocinaj/Tahlis Poasa/Benjamin Sutton/Blake Turnell)	Most Performed Hip Hop/Rap Work	Nominated	
