= Do It Now (Mashd N Kutcher song) =

2014 single by Mashd N Kutcher

Single by Mashd N Kutcher
- Released: 8 December 2014
- Length: 2:46
- Label: Parlophone
- Songwriter(s): Jim Finn * Dan McNamee * Dan Williams * Adam Morris: Matthew James

Mashd N Kutcher singles chronology
"Do It Now" (2014)	"No Way Out" (2015)

"Do It Now" is the debut single by Australian duo Mashd N Kutcher, released in December 2014.

== Track listings ==
1. "Do It Now" - 2:46

Remixes

1. "Do It Now" (Extended mix) - 3:41
2. "Do It Now" (Slice n Dice mix) - 4:00
3. "Do It Now" (Arcane Echo mix) - 3:05

== Charts ==
=== Weekly charts ===
Chart (2015)	Peak position
Australia (ARIA)	33

=== Year-end charts ===
Chart (2015)	Position
Australian Artist (ARIA)	30

== Certifications ==
Region	Certification	Certified units/sales
Australia (ARIA)	Gold	35,000^{^}
^{^} Shipments figures based on certification alone.
