= Yours to Keep (Sticky Fingers album) =

Studio album by Sticky Fingers
- Released: 8 February 2019
- Studio: Rocking Horse Studios, Byron Bay, New South Wales, Australia
- Genre: Reggae, rock
- Length: 42:26
- Label: Sureshaker
- Producer: Dann Hume

Sticky Fingers chronology
Westway (The Glitter & the Slums) (2016)	Yours to Keep (2019)	Lekkerboy (2022)

Singles from Yours to Keep
- 1. "Kick On" Released: 12 April 2018; 2. "Cool & Calm" Released: 21 September 2018; 3. "Loose Ends" Released: 16 November 2018; 4. "Not Done Yet" Released: 25 January 2019; 5. "Another Episode" Released: 8 March 2019; 6. "Sunsick Moon" Released: April 2019; 7. "Sleep Alone" Released: October 2019

Yours to Keep is the fourth studio album by Australian rock band Sticky Fingers, released in February 2019 through Sureshaker. It was produced by Dann Hume, at Rocking Horse Studios, Byron Bay. Hume had produced the band's previous albums. The album peaked at number four on the ARIA Albums chart.

== Background ==
Yours to Keep appeared in February 2019, more than two years after Sticky Fingers' third studio album, Westway (The Glitter & the Slums) (2016). Yours to Keep peaked at number four on the ARIA Albums and on the ARIA Top 100 Physical Albums charts, number three on the ARIA Digital Albums chart and number one on the ARIA Australian Artists Albums chart. The band's line-up was Paddy Cornwall, Seamus Coyle, Dylan Frost, Eric "Beaker Best" da Silva Gruener and Daniel "Freddy Crabs" Neurath.

== Reception ==
Matt Rocke of Rhythms Music Magazine reviewed Yours to Keep and observes, "[it] is sadly stymied and self pitying... they've stuck too close to their knitting and produced a tea cosy. In the end it hurts to say, it's just not there." Atwood Magazine's James Meadows claims the band "is coming to grips with the lifestyle that has both bestowed stardom and cursed them with many inner demons." The album's tracks deal with their issues. Specifically lead vocalist Frost admitted "he struggled with alcoholism coupled with a recent diagnosis of bipolar schizophrenia." Bass guitarist Cornwall and keyboardist Neurath described "the alcoholism and rehabilitation that the entire band underwent during their year off."

== Track listing ==
No.	Title	Writer(s)	Length
1.	"Sleep Alone"	Dann Hume, Daniel Neurath, Seamus Coyle, Eric da Silva Gruener, Dylan Frost, Patrick Cornwall	4:47
2.	"Loose Ends"	Neurath, Coyle, da Silva Gruener, Frost, Cornwall	3:12
3.	"Cool and Calm"	Neurath, Coyle, da Silva Gruener, Frost, Cornwall	3:17
4.	"Another Episode"	Hume, Neurath, Coyle, da Silva Gruener, Frost, Cornwall	4:55
5.	"Not Done Yet"	Hume, Neurath, Coyle, da Silva Gruener, Frost, Cornwall	3:46
6.	"Kick On"	Hume, Neurath, Coyle, da Silva Gruener, Frost, Cornwall	3:13
7.	"Hyper"	Neurath, Coyle, da Silva Gruener, Frost, Cornwall	3:26
8.	"Sleeping Through the Flood"	Neurath, Coyle, da Silva Gruener, Frost, Cornwall, Taras Hrubyj-Piper	4:04
9.	"Sunsick Moon"	Neurath, Coyle, da Silva Gruener, Frost, Cornwall, Hrubyj-Piper	3:42
10.	"Yours to Keep"	Neurath, Coyle, da Silva Gruener, Frost, Cornwall	4:15
11.	"Junk"	ume, Neurath, Coyle, da Silva Gruener, Frost, Cornwall	3:49

== Personnel ==
- Paddy Cornwall – bass guitar
- Seamus Coyle – guitar
- Dylan Frost – lead vocals, guitar
- Eric "Beaker Best" da Silva Gruener – drums, perussion
- Daniel "Freddy Crabs" Neurath – keyboards
- Dann Hume – producer, mixer
- Rhys Fletcher – engineer
- Nicholas Wilson – engineer
- Brad Teoduruk – cover

== Charts ==
=== Weekly charts ===
Chart (2019)	Peak position
Australian Albums (ARIA)	4

=== Year-end charts ===
Chart (2019)	Position
Australian Artist Albums (ARIA)	23

== Certifications ==
Region	Certification	Certified units/sales
New Zealand (RMNZ)	Platinum	15,000^{‡}
^{‡} Sales+streaming figures based on certification alone.

== Release history ==
Country	Date	Format	Label	Catalogue
Australia	8 February 2019	Digital download, CD, LP	Sureshaker Music	SURESHAKER009 / SURESHAKER010
