= Fiona Hill (composer) =

Australian composer

Fiona Hill (born 1976) is an Australian composer, based in the Blue Mountains. Her work focuses on electroacoustic music.

She studied composition in Paris, Montreal, Sydney, Melbourne, and Adelaide, under Graeme Koehne, Trevor Pearce, Martin Armiger, Jean Lesage, and Sean Ferguson, and holds a master's in screen composition from the Australian Film Television and Radio School. She completed a PhD in composition as part of the Composing Women Program at the Sydney Conservatorium of Music, University of Sydney.

Between 2008 and 2016, Hill was Composer in Residence at Trinity Grammar School, who commissioned the works The Cradle : Ein kindlein in der wiegen and Out of your sleep : SATB choir with organ. Hill's work Imago was also used as part of a NSW Department of Education education kit.

In 2020, she co-curated EarthBound, a series of concerts featuring female-identifying artists from Australia and South Korea.

In her work, Hill uses MaxMSP, processed recorded sound, and computer plugins.

== Awards ==
Year	Award	Category	Title	Result	Reference
2020	APRA AMCOS Screen Music Awards	Work of the Year Electroacoustic/Soundart	Imago	Nominated	
2021	Seoul International Short Film Festival	Best Film Score	Circumstance 2020	Won	
2021	APRA AMCOS Screen Music Awards	Best Music for a Short Film	Circumstance 2020	Nominated	
2022	APRA AMCOS Screen Music Awards	Work of the Year Large Ensemble	Śūnyatā	Nominated	
2022	Stelvio Cipriani Composition Competition for Film Music			Won	
