= Caress Your Soul =

Studio album by Sticky Fingers
- Released: 8 March 2013
- Studios: Mr Milk Studios, Linear Studios
- Length: 39:19
- Label: Sureshaker
- Producers: Dann Hume; Sticky Fingers

Sticky Fingers chronology
Happy Endings (2012)	Caress Your Soul (2013)	Land of Pleasure (2014)

Singles from Caress Your Soul
- 1. "Caress Your Soul" Released: July 2012; 2. "Clouds and Cream" Released: November 2012; 3. "Australia Street" Released: 12 February 2013; 4. "How to Fly" Released: October 2013

Caress Your Soul is the debut studio album by Australian rock band Sticky Fingers. It was produced by Dann Hume and released through Sureshaker in March 2013. Caress Your Soul debuted at number 39 on the ARIA Charts. The album was certified platinum in Australia in 2020.

== Reception ==
Dave Couri from The Brag said, "What is most impressive about Caress Your Soul is its obvious attention to arrangement, and in particular, the effort put in to the quality of vocal tracks really shines." Couri continued, "It's difficult to describe exactly the signature sound of Sticky Fingers. You'd come close by blending one part psych-pop, with hints of rocksteady reggae, and just a sprinkling of British indie sensibility". He concluded by saying, "This is a debut record worthy of the attention".

Sebastian Skeet from The Music complemented the band's dance, reggae and dub grooves "which are the essence of their appeal" and said "their debut album is incredibly well put together".

== Track listing ==
No.	Title	Length
1.	"How to Fly"	3:22
2.	"Clouds & Cream"	2:54
3.	"Australia Street"	3:39
4.	"These Girls"	3:26
5.	"Sex"	2:39
6.	"Bootleg Rascal"	3:47
7.	"Caress Your Soul"	2:57
8.	"Laika"	3:53
9.	"Freddy Crabs"	5:08
10.	"Kiss the Breeze"	4:19
11.	"Let It All Out"	3:15
Total length:		39:19

10-Year anniversary edition
No.	Title	Length
1.	"Bootleg Rascal ('23 Remix)"	3:52
2.	"Big Mits"	3:45
3.	"Easily"	2:58
4.	"Slow Soul"	2:08
5.	"Won't Be Long"	3:11
6.	"One Stop Shop"	4:42
7.	"How to Fly (V2)"	3:12

== Charts ==
Chart performance for Caress Your Soul
Chart (2013)	Peak position
Australian Albums (ARIA)	39
New Zealand Albums (RMNZ)	13

Chart performance for Caress Your Soul (10th anniversary)
Chart (2024)	Peak position
Australian Albums (ARIA)	11
UK Independent Albums (Official Charts)	41
UK Vinyl Albums (OCC)	39
UK Physucal Albums (OCC)	94

== Certifications ==
Region	Certification	Certified units/sales
Australia (ARIA)	Platinum	70,000^{‡}
New Zealand (RMNZ)	5× Platinum	75,000^{‡}
^{‡} Sales+streaming figures based on certification alone.

== Release history ==
Country	Date	Format	Label	Catalogue
Australia	8 March 2013	Digital download, CD	Sureshaker Music	CW012
Australia	March 2024	digital download, 2×LP	Sureshaker Music	CWV012 (10-Year anniversary edition)
