= How to Fly =

2013 song by Sticky Fingers

- 2020 remix art work

Single by Sticky Fingers

from the album Caress Your Soul
- Released: October 2013
- Length: 3:22
- Label: Sureshaker

Sticky Fingers singles chronology
"Australia Street" (2013)	"How to Fly" (2013)	"Gold Snafu" (2014)

"How to Fly" is a song by Australian indie rock band Sticky Fingers. It was released in October 2013 alongside its video as the fourth and final single from their debut studio album Caress Your Soul.

In July 2020, a Chrome Friends and Very Yes remix was released.

In 2025, the song was certified 2× platinum by the Australian Recording Industry Association (ARIA).

== Reception ==
In an album review Sebastian Skeet from The Music said "How to Fly is a radio favourite and one of the record's best moments, with Dylan Frost honing in on some great lyrics and phrasing".

== Certifications ==
Certifications for "How to Fly"
Region	Certification	Certified units/sales
Australia (ARIA)	2× Platinum	140,000^{‡}
New Zealand (RMNZ)	8× Platinum	240,000^{‡}
^{‡} Sales+streaming figures based on certification alone.
