= HP Boyz =

Australian hip hop band

- Origin: Hampton Park, Melbourne
- Genres: Australian hip hop, drill
- Instrument: Vocals
- Years active: 2019–present
- Labels: Independent
- Members: YJ; ONIT
- Past members: MWAYS

HP Boyz are an Australian hip hop and drill band formed in 2019 in Hampton Park, Melbourne.The band is composed of "HP Onit" whose real name is Tino Taito and "HP YJ" Whose real name Is Junior Mika and "HP MWAYZ" whose real is Samoa Funa Their most listened to single on Spotify "Engineers" has accumulated more than 35 million streams.

== Career ==
=== 2020–present: 6 to the World ===
The band released their debut extended play 6 to the World on 8 May 2020

== Musical style and influences ==
The group cites Australian hip hop artists Alex Jones and Son of Sam as inspirations for their music, and also UK rap artists such as Stormzy, Skepta, and Headie One just to name a few.

== Personal lives ==
All members of the band currently reside in Hampton Park, Melbourne.

== Band members ==
Current members

- HP ONIT (2019–present)
- HP YJ (2019–present)
- HP MWAYZ (2019–2022)

== Discography ==
=== Extended plays ===
List of extended plays, with selected chart positions shown
Title	Details	Peak chart positions	
Title	Details	AUS	NZ
6 to the World	Released: 8 May 2020; Label: The Area Movement, Warner Music Australia; Formats: Digital download, streaming	7	26

=== Singles ===
List of singles, with selected chart positions shown
Title	Year	Peak chart positions		Album
Title	Year	AUS	NZ	Album
"BluePrint"	2019	—	—	Non-album singles
"Engineers"	2019	—	13	Non-album singles
"Bad N Bouj"	2019	—	30	Non-album singles
"Moves"	2020	—	—	Non-album singles
"Eeny Meeny"	2020	—	—	6 to the World
"Out Here" (featuring Keziah Feterika)	2020	—	—	6 to the World
"6 to the World"	2020	92	35	6 to the World
"Rumours"	2020	—	31	TBA
"M1"	2021	—	— (Note: "M1" did not enter the NZ Top 40 Singles Chart, but peaked at number 17 on the NZ Hot Singles Chart.)	After Party
"Free Throws"	2021	—	— (Note: "Free Throws" did not enter the NZ Top 40 Singles Chart, but peaked at number eight on the NZ Hot Singles Chart.)	After Party
"Hundred Club" (featuring HP Onit and HP YJ)	2022	—	— (Note: "Hundred Club" did not enter the NZ Top 40 Singles Chart, but peaked at number eight on the NZ Hot Singles Chart.)	Non-album singles
"Roll Like That" (with Lisi featuring HP Onit)	2022	—	— (Note: "Roll Like That" did not enter the NZ Top 40 Singles Chart, but peaked at number 12 on the NZ Hot Singles Chart.)	Non-album singles
"Watch the Wick"	2022	—	— (Note: "Watch the Wick" did not enter the NZ Top 40 Singles Chart, but peaked at number 16 on the NZ Hot Singles Chart.)	Non-album singles
"Tell Me How" (with Larissa Lambert)	2023	—	— (Note: "Tell Me How" did not enter the NZ Top 40 Singles Chart, but peaked at number 20 on the NZ Hot Singles Chart.)	Non-album singles
"Let It Go"	2023	—	— (Note: "Let It Go" did not enter the NZ Top 40 Singles Chart, but peaked at number 10 on the NZ Hot Singles Chart.)	Non-album singles
"In My Head" (with HP Onit)	2023	—	— (Note: "In My Head" did not enter the NZ Top 40 Singles Chart, but peaked at number 12 on the NZ Hot Singles Chart.)	Non-album singles
"Reminder" (with HP Onit ad HP YJ)	2023	—	— (Note: "Reminder" did not enter the NZ Top 40 Singles Chart, but peaked at number 30 on the NZ Hot Singles Chart.)	Non-album singles
"RTR"	2023	—	— (Note: "RTR" did not enter the NZ Top 40 Singles Chart, but peaked at number 20 on the NZ Hot Singles Chart.)	Non-album singles
"Daisy" (with HP Onit and A.Girl)	2023	—	— (Note: "Daisy" did not enter the NZ Top 40 Singles Chart, but peaked at number 34 on the NZ Hot Singles Chart.)	Non-album singles

== Awards and nominations ==
=== APRA Awards ===
The APRA Awards are held in Australia and New Zealand by the Australasian Performing Right Association to recognise songwriting skills, sales and airplay performance by its members annually.

Year	Nominee / work	Award	Result	Ref.
2022	"Loyalty"	Most Performed Hip Hop/Rap Work	Pending	
