= Wombat (rapper) =

Australian rapper

- Born: Glenorchy, Tasmania, Australia
- Origin: Tasmania, Australia
- Genres: Australian hip hop; grime
- Occupations: Singer; rapper
- Instrument: Vocals
- Years active: 2017–present
- Label: Warner Brothers

Samuel Phillips aka Wombat is an Australian singer and rapper from Glenorchy, Tasmania. His debut studio album What Death Tastes Like was released in September 2022 and peaked at #2 on the overall ARIA Charts and peaked at #1 for Hip-Hop albums ARIA Charts.

The Underrated single released with Wombat and frequent collaborator Chillinit was certified gold by ARIA.

== Artistic style and influence ==
Wombat's music style is deeply influenced by grime, attributing significant influence to Necro in terms of production and lyrical style. His lyrics frequently explore themes of mental health, personal struggle, cultural identity, and community.

== Community and cultural impact ==
Wombat has openly discussed the cultural and social challenges facing Tasmania, particularly its youth. In his candid remarks, he highlights the lack of opportunities and activities for young people in Tasmania, which he suggests contributes to the popularity of rap as an outlet and form of expression. "I've noticed that raps are a big thing in Tasmania... because there's nothing to do down there," Wombat explains, indicating a significant void in local entertainment and career paths, which in turn drives the youth towards music as a creative escape and potential career path.

He also addresses the isolation felt by Tasmanians, especially those pursuing artistic careers, with a poignant reminder to his fellow islanders: "If you're from Tasmania, don't let the island hold you back." This statement reflects his desire to inspire and empower local talent to overcome geographical and psychological barriers, aiming to redefine what is possible for those from the region. Wombat's commentary not only sheds light on the socio-economic conditions in Tasmania but also serves as a call to action for the youth to transcend local limitations through the arts.

== Discography ==
=== Studio albums ===
List of studio albums, with selected details and chart positions
Title	Details	Peak chart positions
Title	Details	AUS
Chainsaw Man	Released: 24 December 2021; Label: ADA, Warner; Format: Digital download, streaming	—
What Death Tastes Like	Released: 2 September 2022; Label: ADA, Warner (5419712338); Format: CD, Digital download, streaming	12

=== Extended plays ===
List of extended plays, with selected details
Title	EP details
Helo EP	Released: 8 July 2009; Format: Digital download, streaming
Night Shift (with Nerve)	Released: 27 September 2017; Label: Nerve Productions; Format: Digital download, streaming

=== Singles ===
List of singles, with year released and album name
Title	Year	Album
"Strong Warning" (with Flyalacine, Greeley and Nerve)	2017	Non-album singles
"Gassed Up"	2019	Non-album singles
"Zombie!"	2019	Non-album singles
"Watch Out"	2019	Non-album singles
"Black Sheep"	2019	Non-album singles
"Rise Up"	2019	Non-album singles
"Swine Flu"	2019	Non-album singles
"Kebabs"	2020	Non-album singles
"Adrenaline" (with Devlin)	2020	Non-album singles
"Bad Words"	2020	Non-album singles
"Figure 8" (with Shogun and Britizen Kane)	2021	Non-album singles
"Enter the Food Chain" (with Hi Trax and Dialect)	2021	Non-album singles
"Merch Money"	2021	Chainsaw Man
"Ramen Noodles"	2021	Chainsaw Man
"Falling"	2022	What Death Tastes Like
"Rumours" (featuring Chillinit)	2022	What Death Tastes Like
"Russian Roulette" (featuring Complete)	2022	What Death Tastes Like
"Fkd Up" (with Rapswun)	2024	Non-album singles
"Concrete" (with Tbish)	2024	Non-album singles
"Graveyard Shift" (with Rapswun and TJ Kayy)	2024	Non-album singles
