= Melodownz =

Bronson Price
- Born: Avondale, Auckland, New Zealand
- Genre: Hip hop
- Occupations: Rapper; poet; singer
- Years active: 2013–present
- Label: Liiightside

Bronson Price, known professionally as Melodownz, is a New Zealand rapper, poet and singer from Avondale, Auckland. Debuting in 2013, Melodownz has released solo projects including Beginners Luck (2014), Avontales (2017) and Melo & Blues (2018), as well as collaborative extended plays with Angelo King, IllBaz and Raiza Biza.

== Biography ==
Melodownz was raised in Avondale by his Samoan Catholic grandmother, English grandfather and his mother. He has Samoan, Pākehā and Ngāpuhi heritage. Melodownz debuted as a musician in 2013, composing reggae/hip-hop songs inspired by his upbringing. He released his debut album Beginners Luck in 2014, and followed this with an extended play as half of the Young Gifted and Broke hip-hop duo Third3ye alongside Angelo King, 3P (2016).

In 2017, Melodownz released the hip hop EP Avontales, and in 2018 released two projects: a collaboration EP High Beams with IllBaz and Raiza Biza, featuring musicians including Teeks and Che Fu, and the double-EP Melo & Blues. Melodownz won the award for Most Promising Artist at the 2019 Pacific Music Awards.

In 2020, Melodownz began Kava Corner, a YouTube interview series where Melodownz interviews New Zealand media personalities and celebrities such as broadcaster John Campbell, boxer Joseph Parker, rapper Scribe and musician Benee while sharing kava. He was nominated for the Breakthrough Artist of the Year award at the 2020 Aotearoa Music Awards.

== Discography ==
=== Studio albums ===
Title	Album details	Peak chart positions
Title	Album details	NZ
Beginners Luck	Released: 22 November 2014; Label: Self-released; Format: Digital download	—
Lone Wolf	Released: 13 October 2022; Label: Universal; Format: Digital download, streaming	21
Bron	Released: 17 April 2026; Label: Self-released; Format: Digital download, streaming	39
"—" denotes a recording that did not chart.

=== Extended plays ===
Title	Album details	Peak chart positions
Title	Album details	NZ Artist
3P (among Third3ye)	Released: 27 July 2016; Label: Loop Recordings Aot(ear)oa; Format: Digital download, streaming	10
Avontales	Released: 7 July 2017; Label: Liiightside; Format: Digital download, streaming	—
High Beams (IllBaz + Melodownz + Raiza Biza)	Released: 20 July 2018; Label: Sony Music New Zealand; Format: Digital download, streaming	13
Melo & Blues	Released: 23 November 2018; Label: Liiightside; Format: Digital download, streaming	17
"—" denotes a recording that did not chart.

=== Singles ===
==== As lead artist ====
Title	Year	Peak chart positions		Album
Title	Year	NZ Hot	NZ Hot Artist	Album
"8Ight 2Wenty 8Ight"	2016	—	—	Avontales
"The Anthem (Intro)" (featuring Bailey Wiley)	2017	—	—	Avontales
"One More" (featuring Israel Starr)	2017	—	—	Avontales
"$on of a Queen"	2017	—	—	Avontales
"Live Stream" (IllBaz + Melodownz + Raiza Biza featuring Teeks)	2018	—	16	High Beams
"Outchea" (IllBaz + Melodownz + Raiza Biza featuring Dirty)	2018	—	20	High Beams
"Red Wine" (IllBaz + Melodownz + Raiza Biza featuring High Høøps)	2018	—	11	High Beams
"Peace $igns, Gang $igns"	2018	—	15	Melo & Blues
"$moke" (featuring Villette)	2018	—	8	Melo & Blues
"No Mercy" (featuring Denzel Curry)	2019	19	6	Non-album singles
"Fine"	2020	16	1	Non-album singles
"Big Deals" (featuring Diggy Dupé)	2020	35	8	Non-album singles
"Money"	2021	11	1	Lone Wolf
"Pray for More" (featuring Lisi & Mikey Dam)	2022	21	1	Lone Wolf
"Slow Jamz"	2022	—	11	Lone Wolf
"Loot" (featuring Maxo Kream)	2022	—	9	Lone Wolf
"Bad"	2022	—	14	Lone Wolf
"Lingo" (featuring Bleu and Ant Clemons)	2022	30	8	Lone Wolf
"MeloDub (828)"	2024	—	—	
"—" denotes a recording that did not chart.

==== As featured artist ====
Title	Year	Peak chart positions		Album
Title	Year	NZ Hot	NZ Hot Artist	Album
"Indigenius" (Jono Das and Angelo King featuring Melowdownz)	2014	—	—	The Lion & the Lotus
"Bad Luck & Handcuffs" (Jono Das featuring Melodownz & Badcrop)	2015	—	—	Non-album single
"Pull Up" (K+Lab featuring Melodownz & Mustafa Akbar)	2016	—	—	The Worldly's
"Lips" (Noah Slee featuring Melodownz)	2016	—	—	Otherland
"Under the Sun" (Latinaotearoa featuring Melodownz)	2018	—	17	Influencis Et Collabis
"Good Juju" (K+Lab featuring Melodownz)	2018	—	—	The Booty Galactic
"Let's Kick It" (Poetik featuring Melodownz)	2018	—	15	Hamofied
"Take Me to Your Leader" (Yoko-Zuna featuring Melodownz)	2018	—	—	Voyager
"Out Here Alive" (Kings featuring Melodownz)	2018	37	5	Two
"Sugar" (Bailey Wiley featuring Melodownz)	2018	—	6	Bailey Wiley EP
"Spend It" (TY featuring Melodownz)	2018	38	4	Non-album single
"—" denotes a recording that did not chart.

==== Promotional singles ====
Title	Year	Peak chart positions		Album
Title	Year	NZ Hot	NZ Hot Artist	Album
"Let Me Loose" (Rizván and Melodownz)	2013	—	—	Non-album singles
"Cool Like Dat" (Rizván, Melodownz and Diggy Dupé)	2016	—	—	Non-album singles
"Hot $auce"	2017	—	14	Non-album singles
"Infinite" (featuring Coops)	2018	—	12	Melo & Blues
"To Live and Die in AD" (Choicevaughan featuring Melodownz)	2019	30	4	Deuce
"Pai / Fine"	2021	—	—	Non-album single
"—" denotes a recording that did not chart.

=== Guest appearances ===
Title	Year	Other artists	Album
"Run"	2014	Rizván, Tom Scott, Yané	Tō E La'ā (Sunset)
"Light Side"	2014	Jay Knight, Raiza Biza	1/8/94
"Stick Up Kid II"	2014	Jay Knight, Bailey Wiley	1/8/94
"Stick Up Kid III"	2014	Jay Knight, Bailey Wiley	—N/a
"Splended Tears"	2015	Yoko-Zuna	This Place Here
"Idfwu"	2017	Yayne	Simple Pleasure
"Attenchun"	2017	Rizván, Freddie Bish	Neverland
"One More"	2018	Israel Starr, NRG Siring	Israel Starr presents The Producers Chair, Vol. 2 (Neo90sfunkadelicsouldub)
"Ride Out"	2018	JessB	Bloom
"Off the Top"	2018	SWIDT, Diggy Dupé, JessB, Rizván	Stoneyhunga: The Bootleg EP
"How Much Fruit?"	2019	Troy Kingi	Holy Colony Burning Acres
"Heart on Fire"	2019	Louis Baker	Open
"Trust (Remix)"	2019	Diggy Dupé, Rizván, Poetik, Redd x Rozay, Church & AP	—N/a
"Vailima Bottle."	2021	Poetik, Lucky Lance	Poetik Justice.
"Ain't the Same"	2021	Diggy Dupé, Choicevaughan, P. Smith, Summer Vaha'akolo	The Panthers
"Kong"	2021	Diggy Dupé, Choicevaughan, P. Smith	The Panthers
