= Chillinit =

Australian rapper and musician (born 1993)

- Born: Blake Warren Turnell; 1 February 1993 (age 33)
- Origin: Hurstville, New South Wales, Australia
- Genres: Australian hip hop; grime
- Occupations: Rapper; singer; songwriter; musician
- Years active: 2012–present
- Labels: 420 Family; Universal Australia
- Website: www.chillinit.net

Blake Warren Turnell (born 1 February 1993), known professionally as Chillinit (/ˈtʃɪlɪnɪt/ CHIL-lin-it; stylised as ChillinIT), is an Australian rapper and musician. He is from Sydney, New South Wales and released his debut studio album Women Weed & Wordplay in October 2018.

== Career ==
In August 2019, Turnell released the standalone single "Freedom", which became his first charting single in Australia, which peaked at number 87 on the ARIA Singles Chart.

His second studio album The Octagon was released on 31 January 2020, and peaked at number 2 on the ARIA Albums Chart the week following its release. The album's lead single, "Laying Low", peaked at number 72 on the ARIA Singles Chart in February 2020.

In October 2021, Chillinit released "Susan’s Son", the lead single from his fourth album Family Ties, released in November 2021.

== Personal life ==
Blake is of Lebanese-Australian descent, his Lebanese heritage coming from his maternal side. Turnell's uncle, Sean Turnell, is an Australian economist.

Turnell was arrested by New South Wales Police in December 2021 for not wearing a mandatory face mask and giving a fake ID.

== Discography ==
=== Studio albums ===
List of studio albums, with release date, label, and selected chart positions shown
Title	Details	Peak chart positions	Certifications
Title	Details	AUS	Certifications
Women Weed & Wordplay	Released: 30 October 2018; Label: 420 Family; Format: CD, digital download, streaming	18	ARIA: Gold
The Octagon	Released: 31 January 2020; Label: 420 Family; Format: CD, LP, digital download, streaming	2	ARIA: Gold
Full Circle	Released: 9 October 2020; Label: 420 Family; Format: CD, digital download, streaming	3	
Family Ties	Released: November 2021; Label: 420 Family; Format: CD, digital download, streaming	5	
Wisdom Weed & Wordplay	Released: 19 June 2026; Label: 420 Family; Format: CD, digital download, streaming	5	

=== Mixtapes ===
List of mixtapes, with release date and label shown
Title	Details	Peak chart positions
Title	Details	AUS
420DNA	Released: 17 November 2023; Label: 420 Family; Format: Digital download, streaming	3
The Green Room	Released: 20 April 2025; Label: 420 Family; Format: Digital download, streaming	—

=== Extended plays ===
List of EPs, with release date and label shown
Title	Details
4 Days (with Huskii)	Released: 20 December 2019; Label: 420 Family; Format: Digital download, streaming

=== Charted and/or Certified Singles ===
List of charted and/or certified singles, with year released, selected chart positions and album name shown
Title	Year	Peak chart positions		Certification	Album
Title	Year	AUS	NZ Hot	Certification	Album
"Underrated" (with Wombat)	2018	—	—	ARIA: Gold	Women Weed & Wordplay
"Freedom"	2019	87	—		Non-album single
"Laying Low" (original or Mashd N Kutcher VIP remix)	2020	72	—		The Octagon
"Stand For" (featuring Lisi)	2020	54	—	ARIA: Gold	Full Circle
"Henny & Reefer"	2021	69	35	ARIA: Gold	Non-album single
"Bad Santa"	2021	—	37		Family Ties
"Dreaming of This Day"	2021	—	24		Family Ties
"Pac Energy"	2023	—	33		420DNA
"Boys Light Up"	2023	—	34		420DNA
"—" denotes a recording that did not chart or was not released in that territory.

== Awards and nominations ==
=== AIR Awards ===
The Australian Independent Record Awards (known colloquially as the AIR Awards) is an annual awards night to recognise, promote and celebrate the success of Australia's Independent Music sector.

Year	Nominee / work	Award	Result	Ref.
2021	The Octagon	Best Independent Hip Hop Album or EP	Won	
2022	Family Ties	Best Independent Hip Hop Album or EP	Nominated	

=== APRA Awards ===
The APRA Awards are held in Australia and New Zealand by the Australasian Performing Right Association to recognise songwriting skills, sales and airplay performance by its members annually.

Year	Nominee / work	Award	Result	Ref.
2022	"Stand for" (feat Lisi) (Benjamin Sutton/Blake Turnell/Rilind Kocinaj/Tahlis Poasa)	Most Performed Hip Hop/Rap Work	Nominated	
2025	"Boys Light Up" by ChillinIT (Blake Turnell, James Reyne, Malik Sanders)	Most Performed Hip Hop / Rap Work	Nominated	

=== ARIA Music Awards ===
The ARIA Music Awards is an annual awards ceremony that recognises excellence, innovation, and achievement across all genres of Australian music. They commenced in 1987.

Year	Nominee / work	Award	Result	Ref.
2022	Family Ties	Best Hip Hop / Rap Release	Nominated	

== Concert tours ==
=== Headlining ===
- The Ashes: Women, Weed & Wordplay Tour
  (with Wombat) (2019)
- The Octagon Tour
  (originally scheduled to begin in April 2020; delayed to September due to the COVID-19 pandemic) (2020)
- All Aussie Adventures Regional Tour

(with Jerry Grimefeld) 2025
