= Mashd N Kutcher =

- NFL Kickoff Festival - Melbourne 2026

Background information
- Origin: Brisbane, Queensland, Australia
- Genres: Dance, electronic
- Years active: 2013–present
- Label: Mash Machine Records
- Website: https://www.mashdnkutcher.com

Mashd N Kutcher is a 3 piece electronic band from Brisbane, Australia. The project, founded by Matt James is centred around the live band playing and electronic music. Performing at major festivals, concerts and events across Australia, Asia, India, Europe & the United States, the band had experienced success with multiple platinum records, a Triple J Hottest100 placement at #12 plus regular coverage on mainstream radio, tv & media both in Australia & abroad.

In addition to music releases and touring, Mashd N Kutcher is a regular name within online pop culture with an audience of over 5 million on social networks, as well as collaborating with and featuring alongside top tier talent including world champion athletes, popular media personalities, entertainers, globally recognised brands, products and services. The band regularly creates bespoke content and performs for the likes of McDonalds, KFC, AFL, NRL, NFL, Intel, Disney and more.

Mashd N Kutcher are best known for their songs "Do It Now" and "My Sunshine", which samples Len's song "Steal My Sunshine". In 2020 they came to public attention in Australia after remixing a speech given by Premier of the state of Victoria, Daniel Andrews, reporting on an early outbreak of COVID-19 in the state. The resulting dance track, Get on the Beers, made it seem that the Premier's instructions to his citizens was to do their civic duty and "get on the beers". The original press conference saw Andrews warn Victorians that it was not appropriate to get on the beers, due to the greater risk of the spread of the coronavirus.

In 2023 following his cancer diagnosis, songwriter and project founder Matt James established an ongoing fundraising component for the band, with all Artist Streaming Royalties for the song ‘It’s Alright’ going to Myeloma Australia in perpetuity. In conjunction with his personal health journey, Matt and the Mashd N Kutcher project are committed to being closely connected with Cancer Support, Research and Awareness.

== Career ==
In 2015, Mashd N Kutcher took recording equipment into six Subway stores in Brisbane and captured noises from the ice machine to the beeping of the oven and staff talking to customers before remixing the sounds into a piece called "Sounds of Subway".

In December 2015, Mashd N Kutcher released "My Sunshine", a song which heavily samples Len's "Steal My Sunshine". "My Sunshine" peaked at number 18 on the ARIA charts and was certified platinum.

In February 2018, Mashd N Kutcher were the headline act at the inaugural AFLX Grand Final.

In March 2018, Mashd N Kutcher released "Need Me" which includes a sample of "Lovefool" by The Cardigans.

In April 2020, Mashd N Kutcher released "Get on the Beers". The song uses and reorders the press conference words by Victorian Premier Daniel Andrews, during the COVID-19 pandemic. The track placed 12th in the Triple J Hottest 100, 2020 and was personally introduced by Andrews. The record went on to be certified platinum.

Mashd N Kutcher announced their Mash Machine East Coast tour co presented by Triple J, which was scheduled to take place in July and August 2021.

In October 2021, Mashd N Kutcher released a new record "On My Mind", an interpolation of the 2003 Powderfinger song "On My Mind".

In 2022, the band launched a new online content series entitled "Will It Mash?" mixing together different songs and genres with the reactions of a guest.

In August 2023 the band spoke to Rolling Stone Australia, announcing the release of a new record "It's Alright". 100% of the Artist streaming royalties from the song were donated to Myeloma Australia, to aid research and support for Multiple Myeloma.

In November 2024, the project released "Don't Hold Back" and announced the release of their debut studio album, Legacy. In a 4 out 5 star review, Lars Brandle from Rolling Stone Australia called the album, "a collection of dance-floor ready bangers and beats overflowing with samples, hip-hop and life."

In 2026 the project began the year with shows across Australia, Canada and Japan, where they played the main stage of the annual 'Snow Machine Festival' in Hakuba.

== Discography ==
=== Albums ===
List of albums, with Australian chart positions
Title	Album details	Peak chart positions
Title	Album details	AUS
Legacy	Released: 6 December 2024; Label: Mash Machine Records	— (Note: Legacy did not enter the top 100 ARIA Album Charts, but peaked at number 2 on the ARIA Australian Artist Dance Albums Chart.)

=== Charted singles ===
List of singles, with selected chart positions and certifications, showing year released
Title	Year	Peak chart positions	Certifications
Title	Year	AUS	Certifications
"Do It Now"	2014	33	ARIA: Platinum
"My Sunshine"	2015	18	ARIA: Platinum
"Get on the Beers" (featuring Dan Andrews)	2020	39	ARIA: Platinum

== Awards and nominations ==
=== APRA Awards ===
The APRA Awards are held in Australia and New Zealand by the Australasian Performing Right Association to recognise songwriting skills, sales and airplay performance by its members annually.

Year	Nominee / work	Award	Result	Ref.
2022	"Get On the Beers” (featuring Dan Andrews)	Most Performed Dance/Electronic Work	Won	
