= Triple J's Hottest 100 of 2021 =

Edition of annual Australian music poll

2021 Triple J Hottest 100

Countdown details
- Date of countdown: 22 January 2022
- Charity partner: Lifeline
- Votes cast: 2,700,000

Countdown highlights
- Winning song: The Wiggles "Elephant" (Like a Version)
- Most entries: Olivia Rodrigo; Doja Cat (5 tracks each)

Chronology
← Previous; 2020	Next → 2022

The 2021 Triple J Hottest 100 was announced on 22 January 2022. It was the 29th annual countdown of the most popular songs of the year, as voted for by listeners of Australian radio station Triple J.

Australian children's music group the Wiggles was voted into first place with their Like a Version cover of Tame Impala's "Elephant", making it the first Like a Version to place first in a Hottest 100. Olivia Rodrigo and Doja Cat achieved the most entries in the countdown, with both scoring five.

On 18 March 2022, Triple J confirmed that a compilation album would no longer be released in conjunction with the annual countdown.

== Background ==
The Triple J Hottest 100 allows members of the public to vote online for their top ten songs of the year, which are then used to calculate the year's 100 most popular songs. Any song initially released between 1 December 2020 and 30 November 2021 was eligible for the 2021 Triple J Hottest 100.

Voting opened on 14 December 2021.

=== Projections ===
Prior to the countdown, four favourites emerged. Various music blogs and bookmakers placed "Stay" by Australian rapper the Kid Laroi and Canadian musician Justin Bieber; "Good 4 U" by American singer Olivia Rodrigo; "The Angel of 8th Ave." by Australian rock band Gang of Youths; and Australian children's music group the Wiggles' Like a Version cover of "Elephant" by Tame Impala as the songs most likely to take first place.

== Full list ==
Note: Australian artists

#	Song	Artist	Country of origin
1	Elephant (Like a Version)	The Wiggles	Australia
2	Stay	The Kid Laroi and Justin Bieber	Australia/Canada
3	Lots of Nothing	Spacey Jane	Australia
4	Good 4 U	Olivia Rodrigo	United States
5	Happier Than Ever	Billie Eilish	United States
6	The Angel of 8th Ave	Gang of Youths	Australia
7	Kiss Me More	Doja Cat featuring SZA	United States
8	Industry Baby	Lil Nas X and Jack Harlow	United States
9	On My Knees	Rüfüs Du Sol	Australia
10	Montero (Call Me by Your Name)	Lil Nas X	United States
11	H.Y.C.Y.BH	Tom Cardy	Australia
12	Lunchtime	Spacey Jane	Australia
13	Drivers License	Olivia Rodrigo	United States
14	Apple Crumble	Lime Cordiale and Idris Elba	Australia/United Kingdom
15	Missing Piece	Vance Joy	Australia
16	Seventeen Going Under	Sam Fender	United Kingdom
17	Mixed Messages	Tom Cardy	Australia
18	Love Signs	The Jungle Giants	Australia
19	Alive	Rüfüs Du Sol	Australia
20	Touch Back Down	Ocean Alley	Australia
21	Sunscreen	Ball Park Music	Australia
22	Good Days	SZA	United States
23	I Don't Wanna Talk (I Just Wanna Dance)	Glass Animals	United Kingdom
24	Edamame	Bbno$ featuring Rich Brian	Canada/Indonesia
25	Next to Me	Rüfüs Du Sol	Australia
26	Solar Power	Lorde	New Zealand
27	Rose Pink Cadillac	Dope Lemon	Australia
28	Hertz	Amyl & the Sniffers	Australia
29	Thats What I Want	Lil Nas X	United States
30	Here Comes the Sun (Like a Version)	Spacey Jane	Australia
31	Need to Know	Doja Cat	United States
32	If You Ever Leave, I'm Coming with You	The Wombats	United Kingdom
33	Deja Vu	Olivia Rodrigo	United States
34	Get Into It (Yuh)	Doja Cat	United States
35	Josh	Peach PRC	Australia
36	Transparent Soul	Willow featuring Travis Barker	United States
37	Woman	Doja Cat	United States
38	Masterpiece	The Rubens	Australia
39	Stacking Chairs	Middle Kids	Australia
40	Serotonin	Girl in Red	Norway
41	What's Not to Like	Lime Cordiale and Idris Elba	Australia/United Kingdom
42	Chemicals	Peking Duk	Australia
43	Die4U	Bring Me the Horizon	United Kingdom
44	Hurricane	Kanye West	United States
45	Chaise Longue	Wet Leg	United Kingdom
46	Get Me Out	King Stingray	Australia
47	Leave the Door Open	Silk Sonic	United States
48	Do It to It	Acraze featuring Cherish	United States
49	Up	Dune Rats	Australia
50	Jail	Kanye West	United States
51	Night Light	The Rions	Australia
52	Up	Cardi B	United States
53	Take My Breath	The Weeknd	Canada
54	Breathe / Comfortably Numb / Money (Like a Version)	Ocean Alley	Australia
55	Valhalla	Skegss	Australia
56	Milkumana	King Stingray	Australia
57	The Man Himself	Gang of Youths	Australia
58	Kitchen	Ruby Fields	Australia
59	Love Race	Machine Gun Kelly featuring Kellin Quinn	United States
60	Brutal	Olivia Rodrigo	United States
61	Pump the Brakes	Dom Dolla	Australia
62	Mood Ring	Lorde	New Zealand
63	Chemtrails over the Country Club	Lana Del Rey	United States
64	Queen	G Flip featuring Mxmtoon	Australia/United States
65	Down Under	Luude featuring Colin Hay	Australia
66	A Girl Like You (Like a Version)	Tame Impala	Australia
67	Traitor	Olivia Rodrigo	United States
68	Treat You Right	The Jungle Giants	Australia
69	Clarkson	Sly Withers	Australia
70	Like Love	The Amity Affliction	Australia
71	I Am Not a Woman, I'm a God	Halsey	United States
72	Temper	Vera Blue	Australia
73	Rumors	Lizzo featuring Cardi B	United States
74	Cloudy Day	Tones and I	Australia
75	Gold Chains	Genesis Owusu	Ghana/Australia
76	Our Paradise	The Terrys	Australia
77	WusYaName	Tyler, the Creator featuring YoungBoy Never Broke Again and Ty Dolla Sign	United States
78	I Hate U	SZA	United States
79	Clash	Dave featuring Stormzy	United Kingdom
80	Your Power	Billie Eilish	United States
81	Stoned at the Nail Salon	Lorde	New Zealand
82	Praise God	Kanye West	United States
83	You Right	Doja Cat and The Weeknd	United States/Canada
84	Wine	Teenage Joans	Australia
85	Lie to Me Again	The Buoys	Australia
86	Just Feels Tight	Fisher	Australia
87	The Aftergone	Holy Holy featuring Clews	Australia
88	My Mind	Baker Boy featuring G Flip	Australia
89	Keep Moving	Jungle	United Kingdom
90	Waiting for Nothing	Hayden James featuring Yaeger	Australia/Sweden
91	Bones	Telenova	Australia
92	Blueprint	Slowly Slowly	Australia
93	Family Ties	Baby Keem and Kendrick Lamar	United States
94	Sunday Suit	Tyne-James Organ	Australia
95	U&Me	alt-J	United Kingdom
96	House of Holy	Client Liaison	Australia
97	Moon	Kanye West	United States
98	Sweetness	Adam Newling	Australia
99	Little Things	Ziggy Ramo featuring Paul Kelly	Australia
100	How You Been	Holy Holy	Australia

=== #101-200 List ===
On 21 January, Triple J announced the songs that made the #101-200 positions.

#	Song	Artist	Country of origin
101	Time I Love To Waste	May-a	Australia
102	Henny & Reefer	Chillinit	Australia
103	Holiday	Confidence Man	Australia
104	Time After Time (Like a Version)	Triple One	Australia
105	Pride Is the Devil	J. Cole and Lil Baby	United States
106	Too Many Feelings	Ruel	Australia
107	Thot Shit	Megan Thee Stallion	United States
108	Easy Love	Pacific Avenue	Australia
109	River	Pnau and Ladyhawke	Australia/New Zealand
110	Week On Repeat	Beddy Rays	Australia
111	Rather Be With You	Hayden James featuring Crooked Colours	Australia
112	Tend the Garden	Gang of Youths	Australia
113	Neon Cheap	Methyl Ethel	Australia
114	Off the Grid	Kanye West	United States
115	Love Tonight (David Guetta remix)	Shouse	Australia/France
116	We Are Midnight	DMA's	Australia
117	Ahhhh!	Teen Jesus and the Jean Teasers	Australia
118	Wet Dream	Wet Leg	United Kingdom
119	Acting Like That	Yungblud featuring Machine Gun Kelly	United Kingdom/United States
120	Method to the Madness	The Wombats	United Kingdom
121	R U High	The Knocks featuring Mallrat	Australia
122	Life Goes On	Oliver Tree	United States
123	The Walls Are Way Too Thin	Holly Humberstone	United Kingdom
124	Stop For a Minute	Polish Club	Australia
125	Stranger Love	Pnau and Budjerah	Australia
126	Wake Up	Skegss	Australia
127	Deathwish	Stand Atlantic featuring Nothing,Nowhere	Australia/United States
128	Letting Go	Ziggy Alberts	Australia
129	Feels Good Now	The Vanns	Australia
130	Stolen Cars	Allday	Australia
131	Lumberjack	Tyler, the Creator	United States
132	Dead Butterflies	Architects	United Kingdom
133	One Right Now	Post Malone and The Weeknd	United States/Canada
134	Bush TV	Skegss	Australia
135	That Funny Feeling	Phoebe Bridgers	United States
136	Questions	Middle Kids	Australia
137	You Stupid Bitch	Girl in Red	Norway
138	Doesn't Matter	Benee	New Zealand
139	My Life	J. Cole, 21 Savage and Morray	United States
140	Good Ones	Charli XCX	United Kingdom
141	He Said She Said	Chvrches	United Kingdom
142	Knife Talk	Drake and 21 Savage featuring Project Pat	Canada/United States
143	Wait a While	Beddy Rays	Australia
144	Fair Trade	Drake and Travis Scott	Canada/United States
145	Heavy	Flight Facilities featuring Your Smith	Australia/United States
146	Sweet / I Thought You Wanted to Dance	Tyler, the Creator featuring Brent Faiyaz and Fana Hues	United States
147	Cherish	Gretta Ray	Australia
148	Lost Cause	Billie Eilish	United States
149	Scream	G Flip featuring Upsahl	Australia/United States
150	Colorado	Milky Chance	Germany
151	Believe What I Say	Kanye West	United States
152	NDA	Billie Eilish	United States
153	Security	Amyl and the Sniffers	Australia
154	Sexy Villain	Remi Wolf	United States
155	Move	Flight Facilities and Drama	Australia/United States
156	Amoeba	Clairo	United States
157	Papercuts	Machine Gun Kelly	United States
158	Moth to a Flame	Swedish House Mafia and The Weeknd	Sweden/Canada
159	Love Song	Angus & Julia Stone	Australia
160	Ride	Baker Boy featuring Yirrmal	Australia
161	Worst Day of My Life	Amy Shark	Australia
162	I Know You Do Ketamine	Candy Moore and Abbie Chatfield	Australia
163	Get You Down	Sam Fender	United Kingdom
164	Girls Want Girls	Drake and Lil Baby	Canada/United States
165	Breakfast	Sly Withers	Australia
166	Way 2 Sexy	Drake, Future and Young Thug	Canada/United States
167	Red Light	The Vanns	Australia
168	Marea (We've Lost Dancing)	Fred Again and The Blessed Madonna	United Kingdom/United States
169	Scarlett	Holly Humberstone	United Kingdom
170	It Ain't Over 'til It's Over (Like a Version)	Ruel	Australia
171	Muddy Evil Pain	The Rubens	Australia
172	Lights Up	Flight Facilities and Channel Tres	Australia/United States
173	Quiet On Set	Remi Wolf	United States
174	Happier	Olivia Rodrigo	United States
175	Futureproof	Nothing But Thieves	United Kingdom
176	I Don't Wanna Leave	Rüfüs Du Sol	Australia
177	King Brown	Barkaa	Australia
178	Most Hated Girl	Waax	Australia
179	The Divine Chord	The Avalanches featuring MGMT and Johnny Marr	Australia/United States/United Kingdom
180	Cure for Me	Aurora	Norway
181	Somethinggreater	Parcels	Australia
182	Foolproof	Hayden James, Gorgon City and Nat Dunn	Australia/United Kingdom
183	Symptomatic	Peach PRC	Australia
184	Waiting Game	G Flip featuring Renforshort	Australia/Canada
185	Stranded	Sumner	Australia
186	Addicted	Jorja Smith	United Kingdom
187	Typhoons	Royal Blood	United Kingdom
188	Changes (Like a Version)	JK-47 featuring Bronte Eve	Australia
189	Don't You (Forget About Me) (Like a Version)	Boy & Bear featuring Annie Hamilton	Australia
190	Better in Blak (Like a Version)	Beddy Rays	Australia
191	Clockwork	Northlane	Australia
192	Get High	Chet Faker	Australia
193	Say It	Choomba featuring LP Giobbi & Blush'ko	Australia/United States
194	Charmander	Aminé	United States
195	Addict	Hope D	Australia
196	Juno	Running Touch	Australia
197	My Ways	Sycco	Australia
198	Backseat	Fergus James	Australia
199	Unison	Gang of Youths	Australia
200	Good Girls	Chvrches	United Kingdom

== Statistics ==
=== Artists with multiple entries ===
#	Artist	Tracks
5	Olivia Rodrigo	4, 13, 33, 60, 67
5	Doja Cat	7, 31, 34, 37, 83
4	Kanye West	44, 50, 82, 97
3	Spacey Jane	3, 12, 30
3	SZA (Note: Once with Doja Cat (7), twice solo (22, 78))	7, 22, 78
3	Lil Nas X	8, 10, 29
3	Rüfüs Du Sol	9, 19, 25
3	Lorde	26, 62, 81
2	Billie Eilish	5, 80
2	Gang of Youths	6, 57
2	Tom Cardy	11, 17
2	Lime Cordiale (Note: Twice with Idris Elba)	14, 41
2	Idris Elba (Note: Twice with Lime Cordiale)	14, 41
2	The Jungle Giants	18, 68
2	Ocean Alley	20, 54
2	King Stingray	46, 56
2	Cardi B (Note: Once solo (52) and once with Lizzo (73))	52, 73
2	The Weeknd (Note: Once solo (53) and once with Doja Cat (83))	53, 83
2	G Flip (Note: Once solo (64) and once with Baker Boy (88))	64, 88
2	Holy Holy	87, 100

=== Countries represented ===
Country	#
Australia	55
United States	32
United Kingdom	10
Canada	4
New Zealand	3
Sweden	1
Ghana	1
Norway	1
Indonesia	1

=== Records ===
- The Wiggles' cover of "Elephant" became the first Like a Version, and the first cover version of any kind, to reach number 1.
  - It also marked the first debut appearance at number 1 since Denis Leary's "Asshole" in 1993, as The Wiggles had not appeared in any previous countdowns.
  - Original Wiggle Jeff Fatt became the oldest person (at the age of 68 during the countdown), and the first of Asian descent, to appear on a number-one track.
  - The Wiggles are also the first winning artist since The Rubens in 2015 to only feature once in the countdown.
- By reaching number 2 with "Stay", The Kid Laroi became the highest ranking artist of Indigenous Australian descent in Hottest 100 history, overtaking Thelma Plum's number 9 placing from 2019.
  - The track also marked the first ever appearance of pop star Justin Bieber in the Hottest 100, following Triple J's threat to disqualify him from being eligible in 2015.
- Peking Duk made their eighth consecutive appearance, with at least one track featured in every annual countdown since 2014.
- Billie Eilish became the first artist to feature in the top 10 of an annual countdown for four years in a row (2018–2021). The previous record was three consecutive years, held by Powderfinger (1998–2000), The White Stripes (2003–2005), and Chet Faker (2013–2015).
- 32 tracks by artists from the United States featured, the highest since 2006.
- The only artist to appear in both the 2022 countdown and the original 1993 list is Paul Kelly.
- A record six previous winners of the Hottest 100 appeared in this years countdown – Vance Joy (2013), The Rubens (2015), Kendrick Lamar (2017), Ocean Alley (2018), Billie Eilish (2019) & Glass Animals (2020). Beating the record of five set in the 2017 countdown.

== 2021 Triple J Album Poll ==
The annual Triple J album poll was held across November and December and was announced on 12 December 2021.

Note: Australian artists

#	Artist	Album	Country of origin	Tracks in the Hottest 100
1	Rüfüs Du Sol	Surrender	Australia	9, 19, 25
2	Genesis Owusu	Smiling with No Teeth	Australia	75, (73 in 2020)
3	Holy Holy	Hello My Beautiful World	Australia	87, 100
4	The Jungle Giants	Love Signs	Australia	18, 68, (8 in 2019, 8, 89 in 2020)
5	Sly Withers	Gardens	Australia	69
6	Middle Kids	Today We're the Greatest	Australia	39
7	Olivia Rodrigo	Sour	United States	4, 13, 33, 60, 67
8	Lorde	Solar Power	New Zealand	26, 62, 81
9	Billie Eilish	Happier Than Ever	United States	5, 80, (10, 79 in 2020)
10	Ruby Fields	Been Doin' It for a Bit	Australia	58, (61 in 2020)
11	The Avalanches	We Will Always Love You	Australia	(35 in 2020)
11	Lil Nas X	Montero	United States	8, 10, 29
13	Amyl and the Sniffers	Comfort to Me	Australia	28
14	Tyler, the Creator	Call Me If You Get Lost	United States	77
15	Wolf Alice	Blue Weekend	United Kingdom	DNC
16	Flight Facilities	Forever	Australia	DNC (145, 155, 172 in Hottest 200)
17	Skegss	Rehearsal	Australia	55, (27, 66 in 2020)
18	Kanye West	Donda	United States	44, 52, 82, 97
19	Doja Cat	Planet Her	United States	7, 31, 34, 37, 83
20	Sam Fender	Seventeen Going Under	United Kingdom	16
