= Peach PRC discography =

Discography of Australian singer Peach PRC

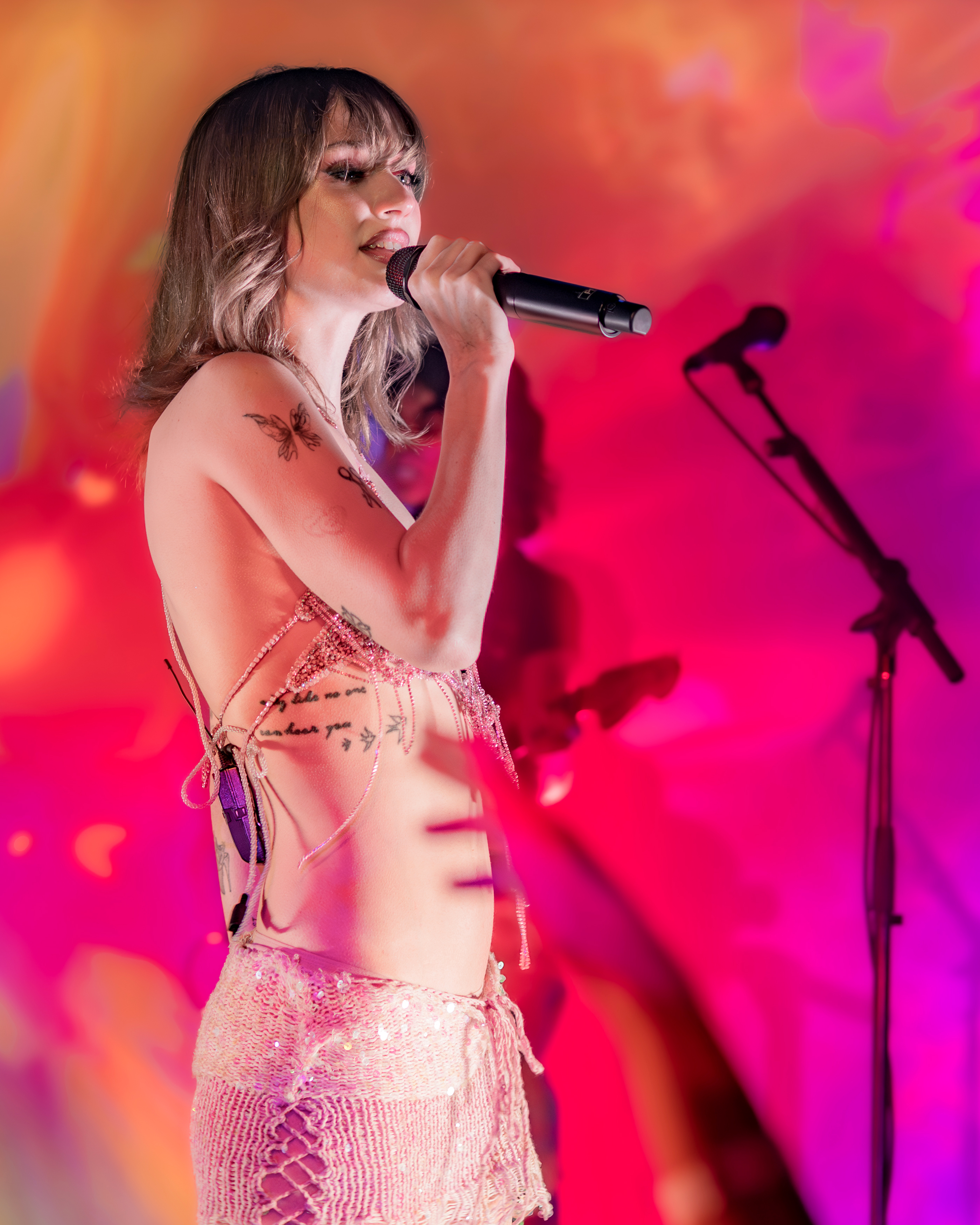
- Peach PRC in September 2025
- Studio albums: 1
- EPs: 1
- Live albums: 1
- Compilation albums: 1
- Singles: 23
- Music videos: 8

The discography of Australian pop singer Peach PRC consists of one studio album and one compilation album.

== Albums ==
=== Studio albums ===
Title	Details	Peak chart positions
Title	Details	AUS
Porcelain	Released: 4 April 2026; Label: Republic, Island Australia; Formats: LP, CD, digital download, streaming	4

=== Compilation albums ===
List of compilations, with selected details and peak chart positions
Title	Details	Peak chart positions
Title	Details	AUS
Chapter 1: Singles Collection	Released: 8 November 2024; Label: Republic; Formats: LP, CD, digital download, streaming	71

== Extended plays ==
List of extended plays, with selected details and peak chart positions
Title	EP details	Peak chart positions
Title	EP details	AUS
Manic Dream Pixie	Released: 28 April 2023; Label: Republic; Formats: LP, CD, digital download, streaming	1
Secret PRC Live	Released: 1 November 2024; Label: Republic; Formats: Digital download, streaming	—

=== Streaming-exclusive releases ===
List of streaming-exclusive released with notes
Title	Description	Notes
Spotify Singles	Released: 28 June 2022; Label: Republic; Formats: Streaming	Spotify-exclusive EP consisting of a live acoustic version of "Teenage Dirtbag" and "God Is a Freak".
Apple Music Home Session: Peach PRC	Released: 24 February 2023; Label: Republic; Formats: Streaming	Apple Music-exclusive EP consisting of a live acoustic version of "Perfect for You" and "Love at First Sight".

== Singles ==
List of singles, with year released, selected chart positions, and album name shown
Title	Year	Peak chart positions		Certifications	Album
Title	Year	AUS	NZ Hot	Certifications	Album
"Blondes"	2019	—	—		Non-album singles
"Colourblind"	2020	—	—		Non-album singles
"Josh"	2021	38	9	ARIA: Platinum	Non-album singles
"Symptomatic"	2021	—	24		Music Is Universal: Manic Dream Pixie Pride
"I've Been Bad, Santa"	2021	—	—		Non-album single
"Heavy"	2021	76	19		Music Is Universal: Manic Dream Pixie Pride
"God Is a Freak"	2022	60	13	ARIA: Gold	Music Is Universal: Manic Dream Pixie Pride
"Forever Drunk"	2022	—	8		Music Is Universal: Manic Dream Pixie Pride
"Perfect for You"	2023	—	26		Manic Dream Pixie
"F U Goodbye"	2023	—	27		Manic Dream Pixie
"Kinda Famous"	2023	—	35		Manic Dream Pixie
"Like a Girl Does"	2023	—	—		Chapter 1: Singles Collection
"Secret"	2024	—	32		Chapter 1: Singles Collection
"Touchy Subject"	2024	—	—		Chapter 1: Singles Collection
"Time of My Life"	2024	—	—		Chapter 1: Singles Collection
"Sweet n Low"	2025	—	—		Non-album single
"Miss Erotica"	2025	—	—		Porcelain
"Out Loud"	2025	—	—		Porcelain
"Back to You"	2026	—	—		Porcelain
"Eucalyptus"	2026	—	—		Porcelain
"Hold It for Her"	2026	—	29		Porcelain
"Distant Lands"	2026	—	—		Porcelain Kiln
"Teenage Losers"	2026	—	—		Porcelain Kiln
"Rescue Dog"	2026	—	—		Porcelain Kiln

=== Music videos ===
Title	Year	Director
"Josh"	2021	Josh Harris
"Symptomatic"	2021	Katia Temkin
"Heavy"	2021	Stephanie Jane Day
"Forever Drunk"	2022	
"Perfect for You"	2023	
"Like a Girl Does"	2023	Josh Harris
"Time of My Life"	2024	Josh Harris
"Miss Erotica"	2025	Maris Jones
"Hold It for Her"	2026	
