= Surrender (Remixes) =

Remix album by Rüfüs Du Sol
- Released: 12 August 2022
- Label: Rose Avenue

Rüfüs Du Sol chronology
| Surrender (2021) | Surrender (Remixes) (2022) | Inhale / Exhale (2024) |

Surrender (Remixes) is the second remix album by Australian alternative dance group, Rüfüs Du Sol. The collection features remixes from Rüfüs Du Sol's fourth studio album, Surrender. Surrender (Remixes) was announced on 29 July 2022 and released on 12 August 2022.

Upon release, Rüfüs Du Sol said "We're so excited to have curated this collection of tracks geared for the dancefloor from artists we love and respect from around the world. Hearing these amazing artists all breathe new life into our music in their own ways is such a treat for us. We've been road-testing these in our DJ sets all year, they've been going off. Sad to let go of some of our secret weapons, but we can't wait for everyone to hear the full fourteen tracks."

== Reception ==
Alex Lambeau from Dancing Astronaut said "Melancholic chords, euphoric melodies, and stripped back progressions highlight the 14 deep-house remixes on Surrender."

== Track listing ==
| No. | Title | Length |
|---|---|---|
| 1. | "Next to Me" (Vintage Culture remix) | 6:22 |
| 2. | "Make it Happen" (Dom Dolla remix) | 4:27 |
| 3. | "See You Again" (Carlita remix) | 4:14 |
| 4. | "I Don't Wanna Leave" (Innellea remix) | 6:23 |
| 5. | "Alive" (Anyma remix) | 5:11 |
| 6. | "On My Knees" (Adriatique Remix) | 7:32 |
| 7. | "Wildfire" (Colyn remix) | 7:42 |
| 8. | "Surrender" (featuring Curtis Harding) (Magdalena remix) | 5:59 |
| 9. | "Devotion" (Luke Alessi remix) | 7:12 |
| 10. | "Always" (Monkey Safari remix) | 6:51 |

| No. | Title | Length |
|---|---|---|
| 1. | "Next to Me" (Adana Twins 'A Night at Revolver' remix) | 7:49 |
| 2. | "Alive" (Solomun remix) | 8:54 |
| 3. | "On My Knees" (Cassian remix) | 5:48 |
| 4. | "On My Knees" (Oliver Schories remix) | 6:34 |
