= List of number-one Australian Artist albums of 2026 =

The ARIA Albums Chart ranks the best-performing albums in Australia. Its data, published by the Australian Recording Industry Association, is based collectively on the weekly streams and digital and physical sales of albums.

To be eligible to appear on the chart, the recording must be an album produced by an artist of Australian nationality and released in the last two years. Older albums are placed on the On Replay Chart.

Key
†	Also the #1 album on the ARIA Albums Chart

== Chart history ==
List of number-one albums
Issue date	Album	Artist(s)	Ref.
5 January	Deadbeat	Tame Impala	
12 January	I Love My Computer	Ninajirachi	
19 January	Before I Forget	The Kid Laroi	
26 January	Before I Forget	The Kid Laroi	
2 February	If You Go There, I Hope You Find It	The Paper Kites	
9 February	Love Balloon	Ocean Alley	
16 February	In Verses	Karnivool	
23 February	Capital Fiction	Keli Holiday	
2 March	Rockhampton Hangover	Tom Busby	
9 March	Lovesick Sentimental	Pacific Avenue	
16 March	Fall from the Light	Hilltop Hoods	
23 March	Love Balloon	Ocean Alley	
30 March	Ultra Dundee	Bad//Dreems	
6 April	Creature of Habit	Courtney Barnett	
13 April	Porcelain	Peach PRC	
20 April	To Be Honest	Sly Withers	
27 April	Tragic Magic	Matt Corby	
4 May	House of Cards	The Amity Affliction	
11 May	Who You Are	Rachael Fahim	
18 May	Experiencing Feelings of Joy	The Jungle Giants	
25 May	Redstar Wu & the Worldwide Scourge	Genesis Owusu	
1 June	Lotus	Hands Like Houses	
8 June	Suburban Cowgirl	Amber Lawrence	
15 June	Where Do You Come From?	Vika and Linda	
27 July	Mood Ring	Holly Hebe	

== On Replay Chart ==
List of number-one albums
Issue date	Album	Artist(s)	Ref.
5 January	Currents	Tame Impala	
12 January	Currents	Tame Impala	
19 January	Currents	Tame Impala	
26 January	Currents	Tame Impala	
2 February	Currents	Tame Impala	
9 February	Currents	Tame Impala	
16 February	Currents	Tame Impala	
23 February	Blue Neighbourhood	Troye Sivan	
2 March	Currents	Tame Impala	
9 March	Currents	Tame Impala	
16 March	Currents	Tame Impala	
23 March	Currents	Tame Impala	
30 March	Currents	Tame Impala	
6 April	Currents	Tame Impala	
13 April	Currents	Tame Impala	

== Artists with Multiple Weeks ==
List of number-one artists, with total weeks spent at number one shown - charts combined
Position	Artist	Weeks at No. 1
1	Tame Impala	15
2	Ocean Alley	2
2	The Kid Laroi	2

== See also ==
- 2026 in music
