= Anon (album) =

2018 album by Australian band Hands Like Houses

-Anon.

Studio album by Hands Like Houses
- Released: 12 October 2018
- Studio: Steakhouse Studios, Hollywood, CA
- Genre: Alternative rock; pop rock; hard rock
- Length: 32:37
- Label: UNFD, Hopeless
- Producer: Colin Brittain; Mike Green; Alex Prieto; Erik Ron

Hands Like Houses chronology
Dissonants (2016)	-Anon. (2018)	Atmospherics (2025)

Singles from Anon
- 1. "Overthinking" Released: 26 July 2018; 2. "Monster" Released: 13 August 2018; 3. "Sick" Released: 22 January 2019

Anon (stylised as -Anon.) is the fourth studio album by Australian rock band Hands Like Houses, released on 12 October 2018 by UNFD and Hopeless Records. It was produced by Colin Brittain, Mike Green, Alex Prieto, and Erik Ron at Steakhouse Studios in Hollywood.

This is the last album to feature lead and founding vocalist Trenton Woodley before his departure in July 2023.

== Background ==
Anon is a quasi-concept album that ventures beyond the band's personal experiences. Hands Like Houses wanted to tell a different kind of narrative with their fourth album, wanting to tell the stories of other people through their music, ranging from a tale of self discovery, to relationships or politics. It was made to be relatable to anyone who listened to it.

== Promotion and singles ==
The album's first single, "Overthinking", was also released on 26 July 2018. The single's accompanying music video was also released on the same day. The album's second single, "Monster", was released on 13 August with its accompanying music video being released a day later. Their third single of the album, "Sick", was released on 22 January 2019, alongside its accompanying music video.

Hands Like Houses performed a national six-date tour to promote the album for February 2019. They played across the major capital cities. Playing as support for the band was Ocean Grove, Endless Heights, and RedHook.

== Critical reception ==
Professional ratings
Review scores
Source	Rating
AllMusic	3.5/5 stars
KillYourStereo	85/100
'Wall of Sound	7.5/10 stars

The album was met with generally favourable reviews. Megan Langley of KillYourStereo in an 85/100 review, praised the band's new sound citing it as "an evolution for the Aussie locals." Michael Parente of Wall of Sound in a 7.5/10 review, noted that the album sounded different from their previous album Dissonants, but it was a welcomed change. The album peaked at No. 4 on the ARIA Charts on 20 October.

== Track listing ==
Track listing adapted from AllMusic.

All music is composed by Hands Like Houses and Colin Brittain, with additional writers listed.

No.	Title	Writer(s)	Length
1.	"Kingdom Come"		2:42
2.	"Monster"	Leeanna James	3:27
3.	"Sick"		3:36
4.	"Overthinking"	Mike Green	2:53
5.	"Through Glass"	Callan Orr	3:26
6.	"Half-Hearted"	James	3:10
7.	"No Man's Land"	Orr	3:24
8.	"Black"	James	3:08
9.	"Tilt"	Erik Ron	3:40
10.	"Bad Dream"	James	3:11
Total length:			32:37

== Personnel ==
Credits adapted from AllMusic.

Hands Like Houses

- Trenton Woodley – lead vocals, keyboards
- Matt Cooper – lead guitar
- Alexander Pearson – rhythm guitar, backing vocals
- Joel Tyrrell – bass guitar, backing vocals
- Matt Parkitny – drums

Production

- Colin Brittain – additional production, composer, mixer, producer, programming, synthesizer
- Erik Ron – composer, producer
- Brendan Collins – assistant engineer, guitar technician
- Jonathan Gering – additional production, programming, synthesizer
- Mike Green – composer, producer
- Leeanna James – composer
- Mike Kalajian – mastering
- John Nicholson – drum technician
- Callan Orr – additional Production, composer, programming, synthesizer
- David Peters – assistant engineer
- Ryan Potesta – assistant engineer
- Alex Prieto – additional production, engineer, mixing, producer, programming, synthesizer
- Anthony Reeder – engineer
- Erik Ron – composer, producer
- James Paul Wisner – mixing

== Charts ==
Chart (2018)	Peak position
Australian Albums (ARIA)	4
US Indie Albums (Billboard)	11
