= Postcard from a Living Hell =

Studio album by RedHook
- Released: 21 April 2023
- Genre: Nu metal; pop punk; alternative pop; electronicore
- Label: RedHook Records
- Producer: Stevie Knight; Craig Wilkinson

RedHook chronology
Bad Decisions (2021)	Postcard from a Living Hell (2023)	Mutation (2024)

Singles from Postcard from a Living Hell
- 1. "Low Budget Horror" Released: 21 January 2022; 2. "Jabberwocky" Released: 20 May 2022; 3. "Say" Released: 16 September 2022; 4. "Soju" Released: 22 November 2022; 5. "Off With Your Head" Released: 3 February 2023; 6. "Imposter" Released: 17 March 2023

Postcard from a Living Hell is the debut studio album by Australian rock group, RedHook. The album was announced in November 2022 and released on 23 April 2023.

At the AIR Awards of 2024, the album was nominated for Best Independent Heavy Album or EP.

== Reception ==
The reviews for the album was generally positive. Triple J said "Stacked with back-to-back belters, Postcard from a Living Hell shows off the bands relentless exploration of pop-punk, nu metal, rock and EDM, delivering 11 of their most powerful anthems to date."

Ellie Robinson from NME described the album as "chaotic". Robinson said "It oscillates from alt-pop to nu-metal, punk and electronicore without so much as a moment of respite, taking listeners on a rollercoaster of sounds and emotions."

Australian Independent Record Labels Association said "Postcard from a Living Hell is eleven charismatic, hook-laden tracks forged in a signature particle collider of sonic influences."

Tiana Speter from Hysteria Mag said "Fusing catharsis and extremely intimate personal narratives throughout the album only levels up the release further, with rage, serenity and everything in between carefully threading the album into a cohesive and compelling listening experience."

Cait Macca from Wall of Sound said "This album spans sounds, genres, themes and features, and while that might sound a little hodge-podge, it all works incredibly well together and shows the range of this band. Even though the themes are heavy, they are dealt with in relatable ways and put to the sound of fun, upbeat, heavy music."

Andrea Peirce from 4zzz said "Postcard arom a Living Hell reminds me of a journal, written by someone working their way out of their own hell and into empowerment. The eleven-track album is an exciting and contemporary pop-punk release counterbalanced by old-school nu-metal at its core. It's worth a listen because it's loud, dark, honest and raw."

== Track listing ==
All tracks are written by Stevie Knight, Emmy Mack, Craig Wilkinson.

Postcard from a Living Hell track listing
No.	Title	Length
1.	"Postcard XO"	2:56
2.	"Jabberwocky"	3:12
3.	"Off With Your Head"	2:12
4.	"The Critic"	2:39
5.	"Imposter" (with Yours Truly)	3:03
6.	"Soju" (with Sly Withers)	2:41
7.	"Pysch v Pysch"	3:29
8.	"Low Budget Horror"	3:01
9.	"An Intervention"	2:37
10.	"Inarticulate" (with The Faim)	3:16
11.	"Say"	2:59

== Charts ==
Chart performance for Postcard from a Living Hell
Chart (2023)	Peak position
Australian Artist Albums (ARIA)	10
Australian Independent Artist Albums (AIR)	2
