= H.Y.C.Y.BH =

2021 song by Tom Cardy

Single by Tom Cardy

from the EP Artificial Intelligence
- Recorded: 2021
- Studio: Tom Cardy's home studio (Sydney, Australia)
- Genre: Comedy; electropop
- Length: 2:40
- Songwriter: Tom Cardy
- Producer: Tom Cardy

"H.Y.C.Y.BH" (an acronym for "Have You Checked Your Butthole") is a song by Australian musical comedian Tom Cardy. It was taken from his debut EP, Artificial Intelligence, which was released on 6 August 2021. Written, recorded, and produced solely by Cardy, the song was debuted on TikTok. "H.Y.C.Y.BH" received praise from music critics and ranked at No. 11 on Triple J's Hottest 100 of 2021.

== Background and release ==
"H.Y.C.Y.BH" was recorded in July 2021 in Cardy's home studio during the creation of his debut EP Artificial Intelligence. It was debuted on TikTok, with an accompanying music video being uploaded to YouTube on 3 July which showed Cardy performing the song in his home studio. A metal keyring promoting the song was made available following the EP's release.

== Composition ==
"H.Y.C.Y.BH" is written in the key of C minor with a tempo of 120 BPM.

== Critical reception ==
Writing for The Music, Joe Dolan labelled "H.Y.C.Y.BH" one of the best songs of the month and said that "it's hard not to admire the sheer tenacity that comes with one man's journey into enlightenment". He additionally likened the song's titular question to that of "What's Going On?" by Marvin Gaye and "Who Let the Dogs Out?" by Baha Men. Another writer for The Music dubbed it "incredible handiwork" and added that "you're gonna have this song in your head for a while". Dustin Rowles of Pajiba praised the song as "art" and called it "the best reason I have ever seen for the existence of TikTok".

Triple J's Al Newstead opined that with the phrase "have you checked your butthole", Cardy "elegantly encapsulates transcendent, universal wisdom". Triple J presenter Dave Woodhead included the song in his 10 votes for the station's 2021 Hottest 100 countdown, marking Cardy's second appearance on the list after "Mixed Messages" placed at No. 17. In an op-ed for ABC News, journalist Abbey Wiltshire attributed the song's success in the countdown to its "unfiltered humour and pure shareability".

== Chart performance ==
Rankings for "H.Y.C.Y.BH"
Work	List	Rank	Ref.
Triple J	Triple J Hottest 100 of 2021	11	

== Personnel ==
As shown in the liner notes of Artificial Intelligence, the song was created and performed solely by Cardy.
