= Future of mankind =

Future of mankind may refer to:

- "Future of Mankind", a song from Artificial Intelligence (EP)
- "The Future of Mankind", a book by Pierre Teilhard de Chardin
- "The Future of Mankind", a publication by M. Aram
- "The Future of Mankind", a publication by Karl Jaspers

== See also ==
- Race of the future
