= Unimagine =

Studio album by Hands Like Houses
- Released: 23 July 2013
- Recorded: 2013
- Genre: Post-hardcore; progressive rock; alternative rock
- Length: 42:01
- Label: Rise
- Producer: James Paul Wisner

Hands Like Houses chronology
| Ground Dweller (2012) | Unimagine (2013) | Dissonants (2016) |

Singles from Unimagine
- 1. "Introduced Species" Released: 12 June 2013; 2. "A Fire on a Hill" Released: 27 June 2013

Unimagine is the second album by Australian post-hardcore band Hands Like Houses, released on 23 July 2013 on Rise Records.

Throughout their UK tour with Pierce the Veil and Woe, Is Me, the band started playing a new song mid-set. On 6 June 2013, the band announced via their Facebook account that their second album, titled Unimagine, was to be released on 23 July 2013 via Rise Records, and that the album's first single, "Introduced Species", would be released 12 June 2013. On 12 June 2013, the band released the song and put up pre-order bundles for the album.

On 27 June 2013, the single entitled "A Fire On A Hill" was released.

== Track listing ==
All tracks written and performed by Hands Like Houses except "Developments", "Weight", "The House You Built", "Fountainhead", "Wisteria" and "A Fire On A Hill" written by Hands Like Houses and Erik Ron.

| No. | Title | Length |
|---|---|---|
| 1. | "Developments" (Unseen) | 3:39 |
| 2. | "Introduced Species" (Unwinding) | 4:04 |
| 3. | "Weight" (Undone) | 3:45 |
| 4. | "Shapeshifters" (Unbreakable) | 3:04 |
| 5. | "The House You Built" (Untouched) | 3:13 |
| 6. | "A Tale Of Outer Suburbia" (Unchained) | 4:21 |
| 7. | "Oceandust" (Unrest) | 3:41 |
| 8. | "No Parallels" (Unbridled) | 3:37 |
| 9. | "Fountainhead" (Unbound) | 3:46 |
| 10. | "Wisteria" (Unkept) | 3:52 |
| 11. | "A Fire on a Hill" (Uncovered) | 4:59 |
| Total length: | | 42:01 |

== Personnel ==
Hands Like Houses

- Trenton Woodley – lead vocals
- Matt "Coops" Cooper – lead guitar
- Alex Pearson – rhythm guitar, backing vocals
- Joel Tyrrell – bass guitar, backing vocals
- Jamal Sabet – keyboards, programming
- Matt Parkitny – drums, percussion

Additional personnel & production

- James Paul Wisner – produced, engineering and mixed. Additional guitar on 'Oceandust'
- Andy Van Dette – mastered
- Glenn Thomas – artwork & design
