= Overgrown (Sly Withers album) =

Studio album by Sly Withers
- Released: 28 October 2022
- Length: 46:14
- Label: Dew Process

Sly Withers chronology
Gardens (2021)	Overgrown (2022)	To Be Honest (2026)

Singles from Overgrown
- 1. "Passing Through" Released: 17 June 2022; 2. "Radio" Released: 19 August 2022; 3. "Something" Released: 28 October 2022; 4. "Liar" Released: May 2023

Overgrown is the third studio album by Australian punk rock band Sly Withers. It was announced in August 2022 and released on 28 October 2022 through Dew Process. Overgrown debuted at number 10 on the ARIA Albums Chart.

== Critical reception ==
Triple J said "On their third record, the Perth boys show a big step up with their rapturous punk rock sound, adding layers of synths, strings and acoustics to create an album that shows off a band at their peak."

== Track listing ==
All tracks are written by Joel Neubecker, Shea Moriarty, Jono Mata and Sam Blitvich.

Overgrown track listing
No.	Title	Length
1.	"Overgrown"	3:13
2.	"Liar"	3:29
3.	"Make Do"	3:38
4.	"Radio"	2:54
5.	"Tongue"	4:02
6.	"Stoopid"	3:17
7.	"Hotel Stuck"	3:13
8.	"Put Me Down"	3:26
9.	"Don't Wanna Leave"	3:01
10.	"Passing Through"	3:55
11.	"Something"	3:27
12.	"Old Enough"	2:45
13.	"Sundays"	2:49
14.	"Last"	2:59
Total length:		46:14

== Charts ==
Chart performance for Overgrown
Chart (2022)	Peak position
Australian Albums (ARIA)	10

== Release history ==
Release history and formats for Overgrown
Region	Date	Format	Label	Catalogue	Ref.
Various	28 October 2022	CD; LP; Digital download; streaming	Dew Process	DEW9001530 / DEW9001536	
