= Ground Dweller =

Studio album by Hands Like Houses
- Released: 13 March 2012
- Genre: Post-hardcore; alternative rock; experimental rock
- Length: 40:38
- Label: Rise
- Producer: Cameron Mizell

Hands Like Houses chronology
Ground Dweller (2012)	Unimagine (2013)

Ground Dweller is the debut studio album by Australian post-hardcore band Hands Like Houses. It was released on 13 March 2012 through Rise Records and was produced by Cameron Mizell.

== Track listing ==
No.	Title	Length
1.	"Antarctica"	4:09
2.	"Don't Look Now, I'm Being Followed, Act Normal"	3:14
3.	"This Ain't No Place for Animals"	4:07
4.	"Spineless Crow"	3:44
5.	"Starving to Death in the Belly of the Whale"	3:34
6.	"A Clown and His Pipe"	3:27
7.	"The Definition of Not-Leaving"	2:28
8.	"Lion Skin" (featuring Tyler Carter and Jonny Craig)	4:19
9.	"One Hundred"	3:29
10.	"Watchmaker" (featuring Matty Mullins)	4:02
11.	"The Sower"	4:05
Total length:		40:38

== Personnel ==
Hands Like Houses

- Trenton Woodley – lead vocals
- Matt "Coops" Cooper – lead guitar
- Alex Pearson – rhythm guitar, backing vocals
- Joel Tyrrell – bass guitar, backing vocals
- Jamal Sabet – keyboards, programming
- Matt Parkitney – drums, percussion

Additional personnel

- Tyler Carter – guest vocals on "Lion Skin"
- Jonny Craig – guest vocals on "Lion Skin"
- Matty Mullins – guest vocals on "Watchmaker"

Production

- Cameron Mizell – production, engineer, mixing
- Glenn Thomas – design
- Jamal Ruhe – mastering

== Charts ==
Chart (2012)	Peak position
US Billboard 200	141
US Top Heatseekers Albums (Billboard)	2
US Independent Albums (Billboard)	21
US Alternative Albums (Billboard)	22
US Hard Rock Albums (Billboard)	11
US Rock Albums (Billboard)	38
