= Mutation (RedHook album) =

Studio album by RedHook
- Released: 22 November 2024
- Label: RedHook Records
- Producers: Stevie Knight; Craig Wilkinson

RedHook chronology
Postcard from a Living Hell (2023)	Mutation (2024)

Singles from Mutation
- 1. "Tourist" Released: 17 November 2023; 2. "Scream 2" Released: 2 February 2024; 3. "Breaking Up With" Released: 12 April 2024; 4. "Cannibal" Released: 14 June 2024; 5. "Pyromaniac" Released: 16 August 2024; 6. "Dr. Frankenstein" Released: 20 September 2024; 7. "Bomb.com" Released: 25 October 2024

Mutation is the second studio album by Australian rock group, RedHook. The album was announced in August 2024 and released on 22 November 2024. It peaked at number 15 on the ARIA charts; their first to enter the top 100.

Band member Emmy Mack said "Mutation felt like the perfect name for this record because we wanted it to feel like an evolution in every single way, not just in RedHook's sound, but also in the culture around us. We're here to shift narratives, offer new perspectives and dismantle old ways of thinking."

At the AIR Awards of 2025, the album was nominated for Best Independent Heavy Album or EP.

At the 2025 ARIA Music Awards, the album was nominated for ARIA Award for Best Hard Rock or Heavy Metal Album.

== Reception ==
Kris Peters from Heavy Mag said "Mutation is the product of a band who are completely comfortable with and within themselves. It is a tribute to the hard work and dedication of a band."

In a positive review, Georgia Haskins from Wall of Sound said "While the juvenile and fun moments of the album are something to hook you in, what really keeps you around are the important conversations had throughout the entire 11 tracks.".

Sarah Downs from Rolling Stone Australia said "RedHook's second album Mutation definitely lives up to its name. The heavy alt-rock powerhouse have cranked everything up a notch, blending alt-pop, metal, punk, and everything in between."

== Track listing ==
All tracks are written by Stevie Knight, Emmy Mack, Craig Wilkinson (except where noted).

Mutation track listing
No.	Title	Writer(s)	Length
1.	"Pyromaniac"		2:56
2.	"Breaking Up With"		3:29
3.	"Hexxx" (with Vana)	Knight, Mack, Wilkinson, Yvonne Winckel	2:44
4.	"Dr.Frankenstein" (with Holding Absence)		3:21
5.	"Bomb.com"		2:30
6.	"Hot Tub"		3:22
7.	"Cannibal" (featuring Alpha Wolf)	Knight, Mack, Wilkinson, Lochie Keogh	3:01
8.	"Hurt Like Hell"		2:52
9.	"Party Zombie"		3:21
10.	"Scream 2"		2:50
11.	"Tourist"		3:04

== Charts ==
Chart performance for Mutation
Chart (2024)	Peak position
Australian Albums (ARIA)	15
Australian Independent Artist Albums (AIR)	1
