= Artificial Intelligence (EP) =

EP by Tom Cardy
- Released: 6 August 2021
- Recorded: 2021
- Studio: Tom Cardy's home studio (Sydney, Australia)
- Genre: Comedy
- Length: 26:23
- Label: Tom Cardy (independent)
- Producer: Tom Cardy

Tom Cardy chronology
| Artificial Intelligence (2021) | Big Dumb Idiot (2022) |

Singles from Artificial Intelligence
- 1. "Mixed Messages" Released: 30 July 2021

Artificial Intelligence is the debut extended play (Note: Whilst some sources describe Artificial Intelligence as an album, Cardy's official merchandise refer to it as an extended play.) by Australian comedian and musician Tom Cardy, released independently on 6 August 2021. Solely written and produced by Cardy himself, the EP features guest appearances from fellow comedian Julia Robertson and former Sticky Fingers guitarist Taras Hrubij-Piper, and was supported by the lead single "Mixed Messages".

Artificial Intelligence received spotlight rotation on Australian youth broadcaster Triple J and debuted at number 40 on the ARIA Albums Chart, becoming his debut chart appearance in the process.

== Background and release ==
Cardy rose to prominence throughout 2020 and 2021 by posting videos on TikTok and performing "Song Sequels" for Triple J's Drive program, Hobba & Hing. He subsequently began working on an EP in his home studio throughout July 2021, later naming it Artificial Intelligence.

Artificial Intelligence was released on 6 August 2021, before subsequently being released on vinyl on 1 November. The cover artwork was designed by Marie Jo Tucholski.

== Recording ==
Artificial Intelligence was recorded during July 2021 in Cardy's home studio. Cardy solely wrote, produced, and mixed the EP himself.

== Composition ==
Artificial Intelligence incorporates elements of comedy music.

== Promotion ==
Artificial Intelligence was supported by the lead single, "Mixed Messages", which was released as Cardy's debut single on 30 July 2021. On 12 August 2021, Cardy appeared on Triple J's Drive program, Hobba & Hing, to discuss and promote the EP.

== Critical reception ==
Triple J's Claire Bracken referred to the album as a collection of "classics".

== Commercial performance ==
On 11 August 2021, ARIA released their mid-week chart report, which stated that Artificial Intelligence was expected to debut within the top 20 on the ARIA Albums Chart. On 13 August, the EP debuted and peaked at number 40 on the ARIA Albums Chart for the chart dated 16 August. The following week, it fell into the lower fifty. On 16 August, the EP was added to spotlight rotation on Australian youth broadcaster Triple J. On 23 January 2022, Cardy had two entries from Artificial Intelligence feature in Triple J's Hottest 100 of 2021—"H.Y.C.Y.BH" at number 11 and "Mixed Messages" at number 17; this marked Cardy's debut appearance in a Hottest 100.

== Track listing ==
All tracks are written and produced by Tom Cardy, except where noted.

Artificial Intelligence track listing
| No. | Title | Writer(s) | Length |
|---|---|---|---|
| 1. | "Why Am I Anxious" | | 1:50 |
| 2. | "Future of Mankind" | | 1:42 |
| 3. | "Business Man" (featuring Julia Robertson) | | 3:02 |
| 4. | "Mixed Messages" | | 2:24 |
| 5. | "Monster Truck (Don't Touch My)" (featuring Julia Robertson) | | 2:30 |
| 6. | "H.Y.C.Y.BH" | | 2:40 |
| 7. | "Carol Brown" (Flight of the Conchords cover; featuring Julia Robertson) | Bret McKenzie; Jemaine Clement; James Bobin | 3:22 |
| 8. | "Big Breakfast" | | 1:55 |
| 9. | "Read Between the Lines" | | 3:01 |
| 10. | "Artificial Intelligence" (featuring Julia Robertson and Taras Hrubij-Piper) | | 3:57 |
| Total length: | | | 26:23 |

== Personnel ==
Adapted from the EP's liner notes.

- Tom Cardy – writing, instruments, vocals (1–10)

Other musicians

- Julia Robertson – extra vocals (3, 5, 7, 10) (Note: Whilst the liner notes do not credit either Robertson or Hrubij-Piper on specific tracks, Bandcamp lists the tracks both of them are credited on.)
- Taras Hrubij-Piper – extra vocals (10)

== Charts ==
Chart performance for Artificial Intelligence
| Chart (2021) | Peak position |
|---|---|
| Australian Albums (ARIA) | 40 |

== Release history ==
Release dates and formats for Artificial Intelligence
| Region | Date | Format(s) | Label | Ref. |
|---|---|---|---|---|
| Various | 6 August 2021 | Digital download; streaming | Tom Cardy (independent) | |
| Australia | 1 November 2021 | LP | Tom Cardy (independent) | |
