= To Be Honest (album) =

Studio album by Sly Withers
- Released: 10 April 2026
- Length: 36:04
- Label: Sly Withers

Sly Withers chronology
Overgrown (2022)	To Be Honest (2026)

Singles from To Be Honest
- 1. "Restless" Released: 17 April 2025; 2. "Make My Mind Up" Released: 24 October 2025; 3. "Look Down" Released: 30 January 2026; 4. "Sick" Released: 6 March 2026; 5. "The Hallway" Released: 27 March 2026; 6. "Setting Fires" Released: 10 April 2026

To Be Honest is the fourth studio album by Australian punk rock band Sly Withers. It was announced in February 2026 and released on 10 April 2026.

To Be Honest debuted at number 11 on the ARIA Albums Chart.

== Critical reception ==
Sarah Duggan from The Music said "As soon as you give this one a spin, you'll hear the vast difference compared to earlier records – it's still got the essence of Sly Withers, but everything else has been stepped up a notch."

== Track listing ==
To Be Honest track listing
No.	Title	Length
1.	"Brake Light"	3:26
2.	"Setting Fires"	3:22
3.	"All the Time"	3:02
4.	"Make My Mind Up"	3:18
5.	"Sick"	2:52
6.	"Look Down"	3:37
7.	"Hotel Stuck"	3:13
8.	"Clearly"	3:36
9.	"Say Nothing"	3:10
10.	"Restless"	3:07
11.	"TBH"	3:16
Total length:		36:04

== Charts ==
Chart performance for To Be Honest
Chart (2026)	Peak position
Australian Albums (ARIA)	11

== Release history ==
Release history and formats for To Be Honest
Region	Date	Format	Label	Catalogue	Ref.
Various	10 April 2026	CD; LP; Digital download; streaming	Sly Withers	9362531138791	

== See also ==
- List of number-one Australian Artist albums of 2026
