= Tom Cardy =

Australian musician and comedian (born 1994)

- Born: 12 June 1994 (age 32); Sydney, Australia
- Occupations: Comedian; musician; songwriter; actor
- Years active: 2013–present

Comedy career
- Genres: Musical comedy; surreal comedy; observational comedy
- Website: campsite.bio/tomycardy

Tom Cardy (born 12 June 1994) is an Australian comedian, musician, songwriter, and actor. He became known in Australia for his "Song Sequels" segments on the radio station Triple J in 2020, and achieved more international recognition when he began posting comedy songs and videos on TikTok and YouTube. He has composed music for the comedy series The Feed and The Moth Effect, as well as the animated web series Helluva Boss. His debut EP, Artificial Intelligence (2021), peaked at No. 40 on the ARIA Albums Chart. He was shortlisted for the AACTA Award for Favourite Digital Content Creator and the Craft Award for Writing at the Streamy Awards.

== Early life ==
Cardy was born in Sydney on 12 June 1994. He has two older sisters: Alex, a cinematographer, and Stephanie, a doctor. He and his sisters took piano and drum lessons during childhood at the behest of their parents, and he was the only one who chose to continue when their parents asked them if they wanted to stop. He studied music and psychology at the University of Sydney, then studied at technical and further education to sharpen his music production skills.

== Career ==
While at university, Cardy wrote and performed for several arts revues in addition to his own sold-out comedy festival shows. Around this time, he played drums for Sydney band the Lulu Raes. He also began regularly appearing on the Australian Dungeons & Dragons podcast Dragon Friends, where he participated as a player and provided musical accompaniment. In September 2020, he was featured on fellow musical comedian Bridie Connell's single "Armageddon (It On)". That year, he also began working with the radio station Triple J on its popular "Song Sequels" segments, in which he produces parodies of famous songs.

Cardy released his debut single, "Mixed Messages", on 30 July 2021. He released his debut EP, Artificial Intelligence, the following week. On 12 August, he was a guest on Triple J's drive time program Hobba and Hing, where he discussed how the EP came to be made. Artificial Intelligence debuted at No. 40 on the ARIA Albums Chart. On 9 September, he released the single "Fruit Salad". On 20 October, he was nominated for the Craft Award for Writing at the 11th Streamy Awards. On 3 November, he was shortlisted for the audience-voted Favourite Digital Content Creator Award at the 11th AACTA Awards, but did not make it through to the list of five finalists. On 21 November, he released the Christmas-themed single "Not Quite Almost Christmas Time".

On 23 January 2022, Cardy had two songs voted into Triple J's Hottest 100 of 2021 when "Mixed Messages" and "H.Y.C.Y.BH" were respectively ranked at No. 17 and No. 11. On 9 February, he was cast alongside musician Montaigne in the SBS musical comedy Time to Buy. Montaigne also featured on his song "Red Flags". On 17 February, he was a guest on Hobba & Hing, where he debuted a song about host Lewis Hobba called "Weird Guy", which was recorded as a prank during Hobba's COVID-induced absence. The song additionally features Montaigne. On 21 February, he was featured in an interview published by Rolling Stone Australia. In the interview, he discussed his sudden popularity on TikTok and explained that his success mostly comes from creating a number of extremely short songs designed to be shared online, some of which get expanded into full-length songs. On 6 August, he uploaded the video for a new song titled "Hey, I Don't Work Here" and announced that his debut studio album would be released in the near future. The album, titled Big Dumb Idiot, was released on 9 December 2022.

In 2023, Cardy continued to release singles such as "H.S", "Beautiful Mind" (featuring Brian David Gilbert), and "Perception Check". In 2024, he co-wrote a song for the Orpheus DLC of the video game Stray Gods: The Roleplaying Musical, which was released on 27 June. He also featured on the Ninja Sex Party song "Dance 'Til You Stop" and alongside Montaigne on the TWRP song "Online". His second studio album, The Dancefloor at the End of the Universe, was released on 18 October 2024.

After the release of his second album, he continued to release singles such as "Walk" on 15 September 2025, "Mind Fight" on 31 October 2025 and "Love Letter To A Dungeon Master" on 14 October 2026.

== Musical style ==
Cardy's style of musical comedy often incorporates elements of awkward humour, observational humour, and surreal humour.

== Discography ==
=== Studio albums ===
List of studio albums, with title, release date, label, formats, and selected chart positions shown
Title	Studio album details	Peak chart positions
Title	Studio album details	AUS
Big Dumb Idiot	Released: 9 December 2022; Label: Independent; Format: LP, digital download, streaming	— (Note: Big Dumb Idiot did not enter the ARIA Top 100 Albums Chart, but did peak at number 3 on the ARIA Top 20 Vinyl Albums Chart on 8 May 2023.)
The Dancefloor at the End of the Universe	Released: 18 October 2024; Label: Independent; Formats: LP, digital download, streaming	—

=== Extended plays ===
List of EPs, with title, release date, label, formats, and selected chart positions shown
Title	Details	Peak position
Title	Details	AUS
Artificial Intelligence	Released: 6 August 2021; Label: Independent; Format: LP, digital download, streaming	40

=== Singles ===
==== As lead artist ====
List of singles as lead artist, with title, year released, and album details shown
Title	Year	Album
"Mixed Messages"	2021	Artificial Intelligence
"Fruit Salad"	2021	Non-album single
"Not Quite Almost Christmas Time"	2021	Non-album single
"Red Flags" (featuring Montaigne)	2022	Big Dumb Idiot
"H.S"	2023	The Dancefloor at the End of the Universe
"Beautiful Mind" (featuring Brian David Gilbert)	2023	The Dancefloor at the End of the Universe
"Perception Check"	2023	The Dancefloor at the End of the Universe
"Transcendental Cha Cha Cha"	2024	The Dancefloor at the End of the Universe
"Walk"	2025	Non-album single
"Mind Fight"	2025	Non-album single
"Love Letter To A Dungeon Master"	2026	Non-album single

==== As featured artist ====
List of singles as featured artist, with title, year released, and album details shown
Title	Year	Album
"Armageddon (It On)" (Bridie Connell featuring Tom Cardy)	2020	Non-album singles
"Dance 'Til You Stop" (Ninja Sex Party (featuring Tom Cardy)	2024	Non-album singles
"Online" TWRP (featuring Montaigne and Tom Cardy)	2024	Non-album singles

=== Songwriting credits ===
List of songwriting credits, with title, year released, artist(s) and additional songwriters shown
Title	Year	Artist(s)	Writer(s)	Reference
"Classic"	2021	F–Pos (feat. Gold Fang and Moody Beach)	F–Pos; Cardy; Melissah Picca; Jamunajai Renaud	

== Filmography ==
List of television and film appearances, with year, title, role, notes, and reference shown
Year	Title	Role	Notes	Ref.
2017	On the Fringe	Reuben	TV series	
2021	The Feed Presents: Cancelled!	Various Characters	TV special	
2022	Time to Buy	Virtual Real Estate Agent	SBS musical comedy	
2023	Helluva Boss	Composer, vocalist	Web series	
2026	The Legend of Vox Machina	Dark Bard	TV Series	

== Awards and nominations ==
=== AACTA Awards ===
Year	Nominee / work	Award	Result	Ref.
2021	Himself	Favourite Digital Content Creator	Shortlisted	

=== Streamy Awards ===
Year	Nominee / work	Award	Result	Ref.
2021	Himself	Craft Award for Writing	Nominated	
