= Dissonants =

Studio album by Hands Like Houses
- Released: 26 February 2016
- Recorded: February – May 2015, Florida, U.S.
- Genre: Post-hardcore; hard rock; alternative rock; electronic rock
- Length: 44:48
- Label: Rise; UNFD
- Producer: James Paul Wisner; Erik Ron

Hands Like Houses chronology
Unimagine (2013)	Dissonants (2016)	Anon. (2018)

Singles from Dissonants
- 1. "I Am" Released: 15 March 2015; 2. "New Romantics" Released: 2 October 2015; 3. "Colourblind" Released: 21 January 2016; 4. "Degrees of Separation" Released: 5 May 2016

Dissonants is the third album by Australian rock band Hands Like Houses, released on 27 February 2016. It was preceded by the singles "I Am", released on 15 March and "New Romantics", released on 2 October 2015. The album follows the band's second studio album, Unimagine (2013), and debuted at No. 7 on the ARIA Albums chart. It is the first album to not feature keyboardist Jamal Sabet who left the band back in 2014 to pursue other musical endeavours. In the week of 29 March 2016, "Colourblind" debuted on the US Active Rock chart at No. 49. This is the last album the band released on Rise Records before moving to Hopeless Records in 2017.

== Background ==
Hands Like Houses began recording the album in April 2015. The band worked with James Paul Wisner, whom they had previously worked with on their sophomore effort, Unimagine (2013). After about two months, the band said that the album was near completion. During an interview with ppcorn.com, guitarist Alex Pearson gave a tentative October release date for the album.

Despite a few setbacks, including the cancellation of a headline UK tour in November 2015, the band announced on 18 December 2015 that the album would be released on 26 February 2016 and unveiled the album's full track listing and artwork. The band performed two free acoustic performances with signings in Australia upon the album's release.

== Reception ==
Professional ratings
Review scores
Source	Rating
AllMusic	4/5 stars
Blunt Magazine	4/5 stars
Currently Streaming	9.1/10 stars
Mind Equals Blown	7/10
Mosh	9/10
New Noise Magazine	4.5/5 stars
RockRevolt Magazine	5/5 stars

The album was met with critical acclaim upon its release. Most critics citing the album's massive choruses, the lyrics, and Trenton Woodley's vocals. Most credited the band's "heavier" sound as part of the album's success.

Writing for Highlight Magazine, Annette Hansen said of the lyrics, "The magic on this record, though, is in the emotional appeal and lush imagery presented in the lyrics. As I kept listening to this album, hearing more and more of the lyrics each time, it was hard not to want to make note of many beautiful lines." She went on to quote songs Colourblind and Stillwater as examples.

Matt Doria of Blunt Magazine praised Woodley's programming and lyrics in particular, writing, "...synths are indefinitely more refined - less obnoxious, but as prevalent as they've ever been. Along with a broadened hot-to-cold singing range, his songwriting has also sharpened tenfold; subject matter is the same as it's always been, but Woodley is no longer appealing exclusively to Newtown hipsters..."

== Track listing ==
All songs written by Hands Like Houses, with additional writers listed

No.	Title	Writer(s)	Length
1.	"I Am"	Erik Ron	4:19
2.	"Perspectives"	Ron	3:57
3.	"Colourblind"	Mike Green	3:42
4.	"New Romantics"	Caleb Shomo	3:38
5.	"Glasshouse"	Shomo	4:20
6.	"Division Symbols"	Green	3:40
7.	"Stillwater"	Ron	3:48
8.	"Momentary"		3:14
9.	"Motion Sickness"	Blake Harnage, Lyndsey Gunnulfsen	3:35
10.	"Degrees of Separation"	Harnage, Shomo, Gunnulfsen	3:41
11.	"Grey Havens"	Beau Burchell	3:43
12.	"Bloodlines"		3:11

== Personnel ==
Band

- Trenton Woodley – lead vocals, piano, programming, keyboard
- Matt Cooper – lead guitar
- Alexander Pearson – rhythm guitar, backing vocals
- Joel Tyrrell – bass guitar, backing vocals
- Matt Parkitny – drums

Production

- James Paul Wisner - producer, engineer, mixing
- Erik Ron - producer, engineer, mixing
- Mike Green - engineer
- Jason Adams - engineer
- Blake Harnage - engineer
- Andy VanDette - mastering
- Tony Noriega - assisting

== Charts ==
Chart (2016)	Peak position
Australian Albums (ARIA)	7
US Billboard 200	68
