= On My Knees (Rüfüs Du Sol song) =

Single by Rüfüs Du Sol

from the album Surrender
- Released: 24 September 2021
- Length: 4:21
- Label: Rose Avenue; Reprise
- Songwriters: Jason Evigan; Jon George; Robert Warner; James Hunt
- Producers: Robert Warner* Jon George: Tyrone Lindqvist; James Hunt

Rüfüs Du Sol singles chronology
"Next to Me" (2021)	"On My Knees" (2021)	"I Don't Wanna Leave" (2021)

"On My Knees" is a song by Australian alternative dance group Rüfüs Du Sol, released on 24 September 2021 as the third single from their fourth studio album, Surrender. In a statement James Hunt said "For this song we had a lot of fun writing something that was darker, driving and a little more edgy. It's definitely one of the most banging tracks on the record - we referenced some of our favorite club music for the drum programming and had fun envisioning the time when we could finally play this live. It had an amazing reaction at our Red Rocks shows last month which was really special for us." The song debuted a number 68 on the ARIA Charts.

At the 2022 ARIA Music Awards, the song as nominated for Best Pop Release, and Song of the Year. At the APRA Music Awards of 2023, the song was nominated for Most Performed Australian Work of the Year and won Most Performed Dance/ Electronic Work of the Year.

== Commercial performance ==
In Australia, "On My Knees" debuted at number 68 on the ARIA Top 100 Singles Chart for the chart dated 4 October 2021. The song rose one place the following week. Following the release of Surrender, "On My Knees" ascended from number 80 to number 43 on the chart dated 1 November, a rise of 37 places. On 31 January 2022, the song re-entered the chart at a new peak of number 22, following its placing at number 9 in Australian youth broadcaster Triple J's Hottest 100 of 2021.

== Track listings ==
Digital single
No.	Title	Length
1.	"On My Knees"	4:21

Digital single (Oliver Schories remix)
No.	Title	Length
1.	"On My Knees" (Oliver Schories remix)	6:34

Digital single (live)
No.	Title	Length
1.	"On My Knees" (live)	7:01

== Charts ==
=== Weekly charts ===
Weekly chart performance for "On My Knees"
Chart (2021–2022)	Peak position
Australia (ARIA)	22
New Zealand Hot Singles (RMNZ)	17
US Hot Dance/Electronic Songs (Billboard)	14
US Rock & Alternative Airplay (Billboard)	30

=== Year-end charts ===
Year-end chart performance for "On My Knees"
Chart (2022)	Position
Australia (ARIA)	92
US Hot Dance/Electronic Songs (Billboard)	96

== Certifications ==
Region	Certification	Certified units/sales
Canada (Music Canada)	Gold	40,000^{‡}
New Zealand (RMNZ)	Platinum	30,000^{‡}
Poland (ZPAV)	Gold	25,000^{‡}
^{‡} Sales+streaming figures based on certification alone.

== Release history ==
Release history for "On My Knees"
Region	Date	Format	Label	Ref.
United States	11 January 2022	Alternative radio	Rose Avenue; Reprise; Warner	
