= Surrender (Rüfüs Du Sol album) =

Studio album by Rüfüs Du Sol
- Released: 22 October 2021
- Studio: Pioneertown, California
- Length: 53:22
- Labels: Rose Avenue; Reprise; Warner
- Producers: Rufus Du Sol; Jason Evigan

Rüfüs Du Sol chronology
Live from Joshua Tree (2020)	Surrender (2021)	Surrender (Remixes) (2022)

Singles from Surrender
- 1. "Alive" Released: 13 July 2021; 2. "Next to Me" Released: 11 August 2021; 3. "On My Knees" Released: 24 September 2021; 4. "I Don't Wanna Leave" Released: 22 October 2021

Surrender is the fourth studio album by Australian alternative dance group Rüfüs Du Sol, released on 22 October 2021.

Upon announcement on 24 September 2021, Tyler Jenke from Rolling Stone Australia said "Working from a DIY ground floor Hollywood apartment studio, the resulting record is one that sees three artists bonding via music, transcending the intimacy of the world they built together as they explore new ground in terms of boldness and bravery. In short, Surrender is the most accomplished and special Rüfüs Du Sol record to date."

At the J Awards of 2021, the album was nominated for Australian Album of the Year.

At the 2022 ARIA Music Awards, the album was nominated for Album of the Year, Best Group, Best Dance/Electronic Release and Best Mixed Album.

The album was nominated for Best Dance/Electronic Album for the 65th Grammy Awards.

== Singles ==
"Alive" was released as the lead single on 13 July 2021. The song peaked at number 62 on the ARIA Singles Chart. "Next to Me" was released on 11 August 2021 as the album's second single. It peaked at number 60 on the ARIA Singles Chart. "On My Knees" was released on 24 September 2021 as the album's third single, alongside the album's announcement. It peaked at number 68 on the ARIA Singles chart. "I Don't Wanna Leave" was released on 22 October 2021 as the album's fourth and final single, alongside the premiere of its video.

== Critical reception ==
Professional ratings
Review scores
Source	Rating
NME Australia	3/5 stars

Ryan Middleton from Magnetic Mag said "Sonically, there are some similarities with Solace. It captures the dark, brooding side of their work with some thumping house beats underneath on many of the songs to provide danceable heartbreak anthems." Middleton concluded saying "Rüfüs Du Sol delivers the goods again for their fans with Surrender. There are the bright, soaring and cheery moments that explode out of the speakers, in addition to the heartbreak and chugging beats that underpin much of the record. They have mastered the live feeling of progressive, melodic and dancefloor-ready electronic music."

Lisa Kocay from Forbes said "The body of work is texturally diverse, offering raw emotions, captivating vocals, organic and cinematic soundscapes, haunting synths, celestial sounds and moments designed for pure dance floor euphoria. Indeed, the body of work proves to be another masterful production by the group."

Cat Woods from NME Australia said the trio "...offer atmospheric optimism but nothing new" adding "[the album] is full of mantras, feel-good schmaltzy lyrics that would sound false and forced in less adept hands. But Rüfüs Du Sol know the power of house music, with its rich, pulsating percussion and immersive synths, can make even the silliest of mantras sound like euphoric sermons."

== Commercial performance ==
In New Zealand, Surrender debuted at number 27 on the RMNZ Top 40 Albums Chart for the chart dated 1 November 2021. The following week, the album fell out of the top 40. "I Don't Wanna Leave" and "Make It Happen" debuted at numbers 10 and 38 respectively, following the album's release. Both songs dropped out one week later.

== Track listing ==
All songs written and produced solely by Rufus Du Sol, except where noted.

Surrender track listing
No.	Title	Writer(s)	Producer(s)	Length
1.	"Next to Me"			5:14
2.	"Make It Happen"	Hunt; George; Lindqvist; Jason Evigan	Rufus Du Sol; Evigan	5:12
3.	"See You Again"			5:20
4.	"I Don't Wanna Leave"	Hunt; George; Lindqvist; Evigan	Rufus Du Sol; Evigan	4:29
5.	"Alive"	Hunt; George; Lindqvist; Evigan	Rufus Du Sol; Evigan	5:34
6.	"Alive" (reprise)	Hunt; George; Lindqvist; Evigan	Rufus Du Sol; Evigan	0:39
7.	"On My Knees"	Hunt; George; Lindqvist; Evigan	Rufus Du Sol; Evigan	4:21
8.	"Wildfire"	Hunt; George; Lindqvist; Evigan	Rufus Du Sol; Evigan	4:10
9.	"Surrender" (featuring Curtis Harding)			5:36
10.	"Devotion"			5:19
11.	"Always"			7:28
Total length:				53:22

== Charts ==
=== Weekly charts ===
Weekly chart performance for Surrender
Chart (2021)	Peak position
Australian Albums (ARIA)	1
Lithuanian Albums (AGATA)	58
New Zealand Albums (RMNZ)	27
Swiss Albums (Schweizer Hitparade)	89
UK Dance Albums (Official Charts)	6
US Heatseekers Albums (Billboard)	1
US Top Dance Albums (Billboard)	2

=== Year-end charts ===
Year-end chart performance for Surrender
Chart (2021)	Position
Australian Artist Albums (ARIA)	30
Australian Dance Albums (ARIA)	2
Chart (2022)	Position
Australian Albums (ARIA)	100
Australian Dance Albums (ARIA)	2
Chart (2023)	Position
Australian Dance Albums (ARIA)	5
Chart (2024)	Position
Australian Dance Albums (ARIA)	23
Chart (2025)	Position
Australian Dance Albums (ARIA)	38

== Certifications ==
Region	Certification	Certified units/sales
New Zealand (RMNZ)	Gold	7,500^{‡}
^{‡} Sales+streaming figures based on certification alone.

== Release history ==
Release history for Surrender
Region	Date	Format(s)	Label	Catalogue
Various	22 October 2021	CD; digital download; streaming	Rose Avenue/Warner Music Australia	9362487538
Australia	3 June 2022	Vinyl	Warner Music	9362487531

== See also ==
- List of number-one albums of 2021 (Australia)
