= Mixed Messages (song) =

2021 single by Tom Cardy

Single by Tom Cardy

from the EP Artificial Intelligence
- Released: 30 July 2021
- Recorded: 2021
- Studio: Tom Cardy's home studio (Sydney, Australia)
- Genre: Comedy; electropop
- Length: 2:24
- Songwriter(s): Tom Cardy
- Producer(s): Tom Cardy

"Mixed Messages" is a song by Australian musical comedian Tom Cardy, released on 30 July 2021 as his debut single and the lead single from his debut EP Artificial Intelligence. The song was written, recorded, and produced solely by Cardy. "Mixed Messages" ranked at No. 17 on Triple J's Hottest 100 of 2021, becoming Cardy's debut appearance on the countdown.

== Background and release ==
"Mixed Messages" was debuted on TikTok, and released officially on 30 July 2021.

== Recording ==
"Mixed Messages" was recorded in July 2021 in Cardy's home studio during the creation of his debut EP Artificial Intelligence.

== Composition ==
"Mixed Messages" is a comedy song rooted in electropop which discusses themes including "non-sequiturs [and] negging" and makes references to "kicking puppies and punching parents". Triple J's Al Newstead summarised the song as discussing "the relatable feeling of awkward attempts to text your crush [that spirals] into a silly ode to brutalising dad genitalia." It is written in the key of E♭ major with a tempo of 111 beats per minute.

== Critical reception ==
Triple J's Al Newstead cited "Mixed Messages" as "the perfect example" of Cardy's "knack for heightening insightful social observations with gleeful absurdism". Joe Briscoe of David Reviews was favourable towards "Mixed Messages" and its accompanying music video, writing that "it's hard not to laugh at what [Cardy] and Antali have created". He commended the song for bringing comedy music "[into] the spotlight with new vigour".

== Music video ==
The animated music video for "Mixed Messages", directed and animated by Gabriella Antali, was released alongside the single on 30 July 2021. Joe Briscoe of David Reviews praised Antali's animation, saying it "[uses] an old-school comic book style to capture facial expressions and movement in all their characterful, frustrating glory". He continued by saying the video elevated "the song's quirky humour with well-observed details (an unflattering reflection in a phone screen is particularly amusing), building to the surreal twist which is thankfully rendered via euphemistic eggplant".

== Personnel ==
As shown in the liner notes of Artificial Intelligence, the song was created and performed solely by Cardy.

=== Chart performance ===
"Mixed Messages" ranked at No. 17 on Triple J's public voted Hottest 100 of 2021, becoming Cardy's debut Hottest 100 appearance.

Rankings for "Mixed Messages"
Work	List	Rank	Ref.
Triple J	Triple J Hottest 100 of 2021	17	
