= Manic Dream Pixie =

2023 extended play by Peach PRC

EP by Peach PRC
- Released: 28 April 2023
- Genre: Bubblegum pop
- Length: 17:49
- Label: Republic
- Producers: Konstantin Kersting; Liam Quinn; Earwulf; Space Primates

Peach PRC chronology
Apple Music Home Session: Peach PRC (2023)	Manic Dream Pixie (2023)	Secret PRC Live (2024)

Singles from Manic Dream Pixie
- 1. "Perfect for You" Released: 2 February 2023; 2. "F U Goodbye" Released: 2 March 2023; 3. "Kinda Famous" Released: 28 April 2023

Manic Dream Pixie ratings
Review scores
Source	Rating
The AU Review	5/5 stars
NME	4/5 stars
WhyNow	3/5 stars

Manic Dream Pixie is the debut extended play by Australian singer-songwriter Peach PRC, released on 28 April 2023 through Republic Records. The EP debuted at number one on the Australian ARIA Albums Chart.

A pride edition of the EP called Music Is Universal: Manic Dream Pixie Pride featuring previous singles "God Is a Freak", "Symptomatic", "Forever Drunk", and "Heavy", was released on 9 June 2023.

The EP was nominated for three awards at the 2023 ARIA Music Awards, and two at the 2024 Rolling Stone Australia Awards.

A deluxe version of the EP was released on 26 April 2024 with new song "You're So Lucky You're Gorgeous".

== Style ==
The album is considered to be part of the bubblegum pop genre. It has also been described as a 2000s pop throwback, with Peach describing her desire to return to "2010-era fun" music such as Carly Rae Jepsen and Katy Perry. The title was inspired by the Manic Dream Pixie Girl trope, coined in 2007.

The song "Favourite Person" is a response to Peach's breakout 2021 single "Josh", with the latter being about a breakup with an ex-boyfriend and "Favourite Person" being intended as an apology for how she spoke about him at the time. "Kinda Famous" was inspired musically by the beat from Robyn's "Dancing On My Own" and lyrically by Kesha's "Stephen", and is about pursuing romance with a "kinda famous" boy band member. The song has also been called a tongue-in-cheek version of Eminem's "Stan" because she manages to be charming despite exhibiting stalker behavior.

== Promotion ==
=== Singles ===
The EP's lead single, "Perfect for You", was released on 2 February 2023. The song is about Peach's first date with her girlfriend, which included them listening to the Paris Hilton song "Stars Are Blind" together, inspiring Peach to include an interpolation of "Stars Are Blind" in "Perfect for You". Hilton responded positively to the song, leaving comments on TikTok indicating interest in a future collaboration, and the two subsequently became close friends. The second single, "F U Goodbye", released on 2 March. "Kinda Famous" was released as the third single on 28 April.

=== Tour ===
Peach PRC announced a headlining tour of Australia for the album on 2 March. The initial tour schedule included single shows in Melbourne and Sydney which sold out, with more shows at those locations announced subsequently. The first Melbourne show, held at Northcote Theatre, was livestreamed on the artist's TikTok page.

== Commercial performance ==
The EP debuted at number one in Australian ARIA Albums Chart, making it Peach PRC's first entry on the chart. The EP spent one week in the top 50, falling to number 94 the following week.

== Track listing ==
Manic Dream Pixie track listing
No.	Title	Writer(s)	Producer	Length
1.	"Kinda Famous"	Shaylee Curnow; Jesse Shatkin; Maize Olinger	Konstantin Kersting	2:54
2.	"Perfect for You"	Curnow; Liam Quinn; Kenrick Randolph Patrick; Fernando Garibay; Ralph McCarthy; Sheppard J. Solomon	Quinn	2:58
3.	"F U Goodbye"	Curnow; Quinn; Forrest Kline	Kersting	2:46
4.	"Loved You Before"	Curnow; John Foyle	Kersting	3:00
5.	"Favourite Person"	Curnow; Quinn	Quinn	3:41
6.	"Dear Inner Child"	Curnow	Earwulf	2:30
Total length:				17:49

Manic Dream Pixie (Deluxe) track listing
No.	Title	Writer(s)	Producer	Length
7.	"You're So Lucky You're Gorgeous"	Curnow; Quinn	Quinn; Kersting	3:01
Total length:				20:50

Music Is Universal: Manic Dream Pixie Pride track listing
No.	Title	Writer(s)	Producer	Length
1.	"Kinda Famous"	Shaylee Curnow; Shatkin; Olinger	Kersting	2:54
2.	"Dear Inner Child"	Curnow	Earwulf	2:30
3.	"God Is a Freak"	Curnow; Quinn	Quinn	3:07
4.	"Symptomatic"	Curnow; Quinn	Quinn	3:12
5.	"Forever Drunk"	Curnow; Bonnie McKee; Marc Sibley; Nathan Cunningham	Space Primates	3:10
6.	"Heavy"	Curnow	Quinn; Kersting	2:52
Total length:				17:45

== Personnel ==
- Peach PRC – vocals
- Liam Quinn – producer, vocal engineer, mixing engineer (2, 5), vocal producer (6)
- Konstantin Kersting – producer
- Earwulf – producer
- Kes – mixing engineer (1, 3, 4)
- Serge Courtois – mixing engineer (6)
- Andrei Eremin – mastering engineer

== Charts ==
Chart performance for Manic Dream Pixie
Chart (2023)	Peak position
Australian Albums (ARIA)	1

== Awards ==
Manic Dream Pixie awards and nominations
Year	Organisation	Award	Work	Recipients	Status	Ref.
2023	ARIA Music Awards	Best Pop Release	"Perfect for You"	Peach PRC	Nominated	
2023	ARIA Music Awards	Best Cover Art	Manic Dream Pixie	Peach PRC and Billy Zammit	Nominated	
2023	ARIA Music Awards	Best Video	Manic Dream Pixie	Peach PRC and Kyle Caulfield	Nominated	
2024	Rolling Stone Australia Awards	Best Record	Manic Dream Pixie	Peach PRC	Nominated	
2024	Rolling Stone Australia Awards	Best Single	"Perfect for You"	Peach PRC	Won	
