= God Is a Freak =

2022 single by Peach PRC

Single by Peach PRC

from the album Music Is Universal: Manic Dream Pixie Pride
- Released: 4 February 2022
- Length: 3:07
- Label: Republic
- Songwriters: Sharlee Curnow; Liam Quinn
- Producer: Liam Quinn

Peach PRC singles chronology
"Heavy" (2021)	"God Is a Freak" (2022)	"Forever Drunk" (2022)

"God Is a Freak" is a song by Australian singer and songwriter Peach PRC. It was released on 4 February 2022 and peaked at number 60 on the ARIA Charts. The song is included on Music Is Universal: Manic Dream Pixie Pride, the deluxe version of her debut extended play.

Peach PRC said, "I found it frustrating when I went to a Christian college and sat through testimonials about how the youth leader's mum prayed for a certain type of carpet for her new house and God rewarded her with it, meanwhile there are children impoverished globally and 'God' doesn't seem to bother". Peach continued saying, "This song is for everyone who has felt shamed, dirty, impure, wrong, unloved and unworthy because of beliefs upheld by the church. Whether you are a believer in God or not, you are worthy of feeling liberation."

== Track listing ==
- Digital download and streaming
1. "God Is a Freak" – 3:07
- Digital download and streaming
1. "God Is a Freak" (acoustic) – 3:00
2. "God Is a Freak" – 3:07
3. "God Is a Freak" (slow and reverb) – 5:16
- 7" (2023 RSD limited edition)
1. "God Is a Freak" – 3:07

== Charts ==
Chart performance for "God Is a Freak"
Chart (2022)	Peak position
Australia (ARIA)	60
New Zealand Hot Singles (RMNZ)	13

== Certifications ==
Certifications for "God Is a Freak"
Region	Certification	Certified units/sales
Australia (ARIA)	Gold	35,000^{‡}
^{‡} Sales+streaming figures based on certification alone.
