= Porcelain (Peach PRC album) =

2026 debut studio album by Peach PRC

Studio album by Peach PRC
- Released: 3 April 2026
- Length: 40:01
- Labels: Republic; Island Australia
- Producers: Harry Charles; Robby De Sá; Xavier Dunn; Konstantin Kersting; Kes; Peach PRC; Larzz Principato; Space Primates; Quinn

Peach PRC chronology
Chapter 1: Singles Collection (2024)	Porcelain (2026)

Singles from Porcelain
- 1. "Miss Erotica" Released: 6 November 2025; 2. "Out Loud" Released: 16 December 2025; 3. "Back to You" Released: 16 January 2026; 4. "Eucalyptus" Released: 20 February 2026; 5. "Hold It for Her" Released: 3 April 2026

Singles from Porcelain (kiln)
- 1. "Distant Lands" Released: 18 August 2026; 2. "Teenage Losers" Released: 18 September 2026; 3. "Rescue Dog" Released: 16 October 2026

Porcelain is the debut studio album by the Australian singer-songwriter Peach PRC. It was released on 3 April 2026 through Republic and Island Records Australia. The album was inspired by the artists' "newfound appreciation and adoration of the natural world" and was two years in the making.

The album was supported by the Wandering Spirit Tour, which happened in Australia and New Zealand throughout March 2026.

== Singles ==
The album's lead single, "Miss Erotica", was released on 6 November 2025, prior to the album's announcement. The second single, "Out Loud", was released on 16 December, alongside the album's announcement. The third single, "Back to You", was released on 16 January 2026. The fourth single released prior to the album's full release, "Eucalyptus", was released on 20 February 2026. "Hold It for Her", the album's fifth and final single, as well as its accompanying music video, were released on 3 April 2026 alongside the full album.

== Reception ==
The album received generally favourable reviews from critics, praising PeachPRC's more mature songwriting and exploration of different music genres.

Emily Hollitt from Good Call Live said, "The music is sparkly and fairy-like, the tracks are equal parts vulnerable and danceable, the songs are all well-construction, and her stunning vocals are on full display."

Shalane Connors from Women in Pop said, "Famous for her fabulously camp, energetic electro-synth-pop like 'Josh' and 'Forever Drunk', Porcelain certainly features that sound but expands her soundscape with elements of rock, country and electronica that adds extra weight to Peach's superb lyricism."

Jade Kennedy of Rolling Stone AU described the album as "one of the biggest Australian albums of the year" and said, "On Porcelain, it’s clear Peach has levelled up. The songwriting is tighter, the hooks hit harder, and the world she’s created feels more expansive than ever."

== Track listing ==
Porcelain track listing
No.	Title	Writer(s)	Producer	Length
1.	"Piper"	Konstantin Kersting; Sharlee Curnow; Carla Wehbe	Peach PRC; Kersting	3:04
2.	"Eucalyptus"	Kersting; Curnow	Kersting	3:00
3.	"Pink"	Harry Charles; Curnow	Charles	3:18
4.	"Hold It for Her"	Charles; Curnow	Charles	3:48
5.	"Back to You"	Larzz Principato; Curnow; Allie Crystal	Principato; Robby De Sá^{[a]}	3:11
6.	"Miss Erotica"	Curnow; Ryan Linvill; Maya Kurchner	Space Primates	2:31
7.	"Oasis"	Charles; Curnow; JBach; Dominik Felsmann	Charles	2:28
8.	"Celebrity Crush"	Liam Quinn; Curnow	Quinn	3:47
9.	"I Wouldn't Mind"	Xavier Dunn; Curnow	Dunn	3:17
10.	"The Palace"	Curnow	Dunn; Quinn	4:03
11.	"Out Loud"	Curnow; De Sá	De Sá	3:58
12.	"Shirley Barber"	Quinn; Curnow	Quinn	3:37
Total length:				40:01

Porcelain (Kiln) track listing
No.	Title	Length
13.	"Distant Lands"	1:52
14.	"Teenage Losers"	2:48
15.	"Rescue Dog"	2:22
16.	"What if We Kissed"	2:40
Total length:		49:41

=== Note ===
- ^{^[a]} indicates an additional producer.

== Personnel ==
Credits are adapted from Tidal.

- Peach PRC – vocals (all tracks), Omnichord (track 2)
- Kes – mixing
- Andrei Eremin – mastering
- Liam Quinn – vocal engineering (1–4, 7, 10), engineering (8, 12)
- Robby De Sá – engineering (5, 11)
- Larzz Principato – engineering (5)
- Space Primates – engineering (6)
- Xavier Dunn – engineering (9)

== Charts ==
Chart performance for Porcelain
Chart (2026)	Peak position
Australian Albums (ARIA)	4

== See also ==
- List of number-one Australian Artist albums of 2026
