= RedHook =

Australian alternative rock band

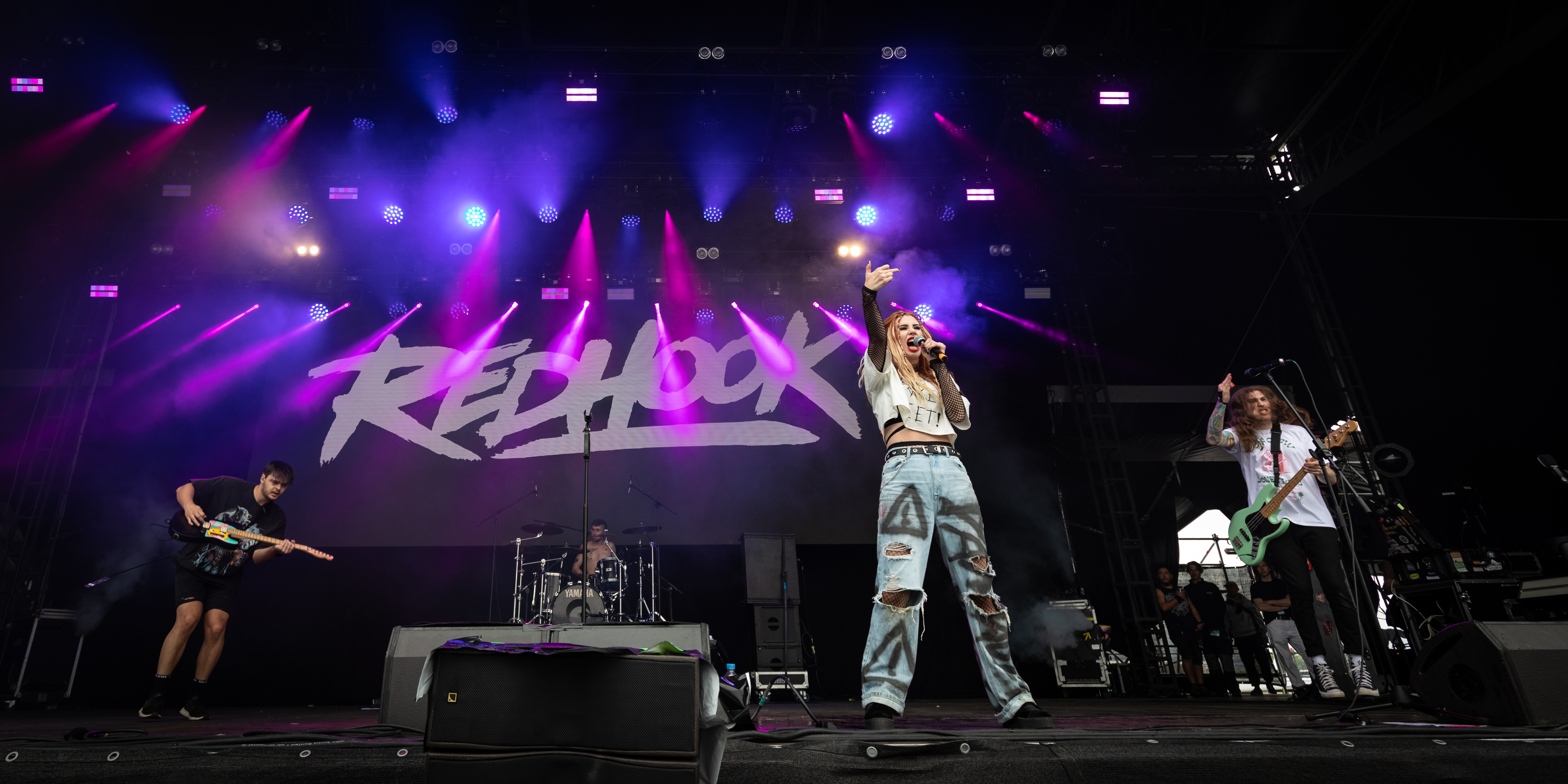
- RedHook performing at Rock am Ring in 2022.

Background information
- Origin: Sydney, New South Wales, Australia
- Genres: Alternative rock; emo; rap rock; pop punk; metalcore; post-hardcore
- Years active: 2017–present
- Members: Emmy Mack; Craig Wilkinson; Alex Powys; Ned Jankovic
- Past members: Dan McFeeters; Matt Coleman; Maverick Burnett
- Website: www.weareredhook.com

RedHook are an Australian rock band from Sydney, who formed in 2017. The band consists of lead vocalist Emmy Mack, guitarist Craig Wilkinson, drummer Alex Powys, and bassist Ned Jankovic.

Their debut EP Bad Decisions was released on 23 April 2021. They released their debut studio album, Postcard from a Living Hell, in April 2023 and a second studio album, Mutation on 22 November 2024.

== History ==
=== 2017–2020: Early years and debut singles ===
RedHook was formed in June 2017 by Emmy Mack on vocals and Matt Coleman (performing as Suburban) on bass guitar, they were both previously in the rock band Smokin' Mirrors, Craig Wilkinson was later recruited as their guitarist. Coleman's role in the band was later changed to just a studio and touring member, not appearing in any music videos or promotional art as he chose to focus on his solo career. They had been performing in small clubs across Sydney and at the time had not officially released any music.

In June 2018 the following year, they released their debut single "Minute on Fire" to positive reviews across Australia's top national and community radio stations and music sites including Triple J, Triple M, FBi, Music Feeds and over 1.8 million streams. After the success of their debut single, RedHook went on to play as a support band for popular Australian bands such as The Getaway Plan, Dream On, Dreamer, Stand Atlantic, Dear Seattle, Thornhill, and popular American nu-metal band Trapt. Later that year, in December, RedHook joined the lineup for the inaugural Good Things festival in Sydney as a local support band. Days after their performance at Good Things, RedHook released a music video for their sophomore single "Turn Up the Stereotype" that was released in October. The single also officially introduced new member, drummer Dan McFeeters. The music video was filmed inside a decommissioned slaughterhouse out in western Sydney, and also inside the band's bathroom shower. It shows Wilkinson and Mack as characters "sadboi" and "strngegrrl" respectively, being kidnapped by mad scientists and experimented on. Afterward they seem to shift from one genre of music to the next, going from goth to glam, emo, pop punk to indie among others. In late-December, Dan begun having undisclosed health issues and was then out of action from touring, the band used stand-ins until a replacement was found.

RedHook performing at Halloween Hysteria in 2019

On 31 January 2019, it was announced that RedHook had signed onto New World Artists for bookings. On 8 February, RedHook released their third single "Paralysed". Mack describing the song, said that "anyone who's ever struggled with their mental health will understand the feeling that this song is about, probably all too well." The single was produced by Stevie Knight and Dave Petrovic, and mixed by Andrew Wade. RedHook later performed a 6-date tour as a supporting act for Hands Like Houses, Ocean Grove and Endless Heights in February. After the tour, Arborview drummer and backup vocalist Alex Powys joined RedHook as their new drummer. In June, studio and touring bassist Surburban left the band to pursue his solo career, Maverick Burnett was brought on to replace him. RedHook later went on to perform at Download Festival in the UK that month, marking their first international performance. RedHook also went on to support Bad Wolves on their UK shows and then supported Three Days Grace in Europe later that month. On 24 June, RedHook teased on their social media that a new single was in the making. Their fourth single "Only Bones" was released on 5 July, alongside an accompanying music video. The music video contained footage of their recent Europe and UK tour. On 23 July, "Only Bones" was added to full rotation on Triple J. RedHook are also set to perform on their debut headline tour to promote "Only Bones" in August, their show locations excluded Brisbane. To celebrate the 20th anniversary of "Guerrilla Radio" by Rage Against the Machine, RedHook covered the song and released a music video for it. The band later performed at Halloween Hysteria 2019 on 25 October, after assuring their Brisbane fans they had not been forgotten. On 26 November, RedHook previewed their new single "Fake" on Triple J's Good Nights segment with Bridgett Hustwaite, it was fully released on 29 November. From 20 to 22 December, RedHook performed a launch tour for "Fake" while supporting Cog. Sometime after the release of "Fake", bassist Maverick Burnett exited the band for unknown reasons, reducing it to a trio again.

On 28 December, an episode of the Life Is Peachy Podcast was released featuring Emmy Mack. The extensive interview went over Mack's position singing for RedHook, the role music has played throughout her life and towards the singers mental health, connecting with fans around the world and the bands music video back catalogue and collaborations with Her Name Is Murder Productions.

From 23 to 25 January 2020, they supported The Amity Affliction on the New South Wales leg of their All My Friends Are Dead tour. On 28 January, a music video for "Fake" was released. RedHook were scheduled to play at Download Festival in March, however due to the COVID-19 pandemic, Download Festival was cancelled and postponed until the following year. Despite this, RedHook released their sixth single "Dead Walk" on 27 March. On 3 April, a music video for "Dead Walk" was released by Dreambound.

=== 2020–2021: Bad Decisions ===
In an interview with Hysteria Magazine in March 2020 vocalist Emmy Mack teased an upcoming EP and revealed plans to record in April. On 13 November, they released their next single "Cure 4 Psycho" which Mack described as "written from the perspective of a survivor raising a defiant middle-finger to her would-be killer."

On 12 February 2021, RedHook released the single "Bad Decisions" and also announced their upcoming EP of the same name. The single features gang vocals from their band friends; Yours Truly, The Dead Love, Grenade Jumper, Fangz, Down For Tomorrow, and The Last Martyr. A music video for "Bad Decisions" was released on 5 March. The EP Bad Decisions was announced with a release date of 23 April. Their previous single "Cure 4 Psycho" will also appear on the EP. A six-leg Bad Decisions EP tour was also announced lasting from 30 April until 15 May. On 22 April, RedHook released the single "Kamikaze" featuring guest vocals from Will King of Windwaker. The track premiered early on Triple J's Short.Fast.Loud segment the night before. The EP was then officially released the following day as planned. A new single, "Sentimental Surgery" was released on 24 September alongside an accompanying music video.

=== 2022–2023: Postcard from a Living Hell ===
On 21 January 2022, RedHook released the single "Low Budget Horror" alongside a lyric video. It was the first single to feature bassist Ned Jankovic as a full fledged member of the band. The single takes aim at online bullies.

On 20 May 2022, RedHook's single "Jabberwocky" was released. Its message stands with sexual assault survivors, written by Mack herself based on an experience she had. RedHook are scheduled to appear at Good Things festival in December, announced as part of the permanent line-up. As opposed to their appearance at Good Things 2018, wherein they only played as a local act for the Sydney show. On 20 September, RedHook released the single "Say" based on Mack's experiences with sexism in the industry.

On 22 November 2022, Redhook released the single "Soju" featuring vocals by Sly Withers frontman Jono Mata, alongside an accompanying music video. They also announced the forthcoming release of their debut studio album, Postcard from a Living Hell, released on 21 April 2023.

=== 2023–present: Mutation ===
In November 2023, RedHook released "Tourist".

On 23 August 2024, RedHook announced their upcoming second studio album, Mutation. It was released on 22 November 2024. It peaked at number 15 on the ARIA charts; their first to enter the top 100.

== Musical style ==
The band describe themselves as "screaming rap rock electro pop mutants", owing to their unusual combination of genres such as metalcore, electronica, and rap. Vocalist Emmy Mack and guitarist Craig Wilkinson work together to write the lyrics. Their sound has been related to bands such as Bring Me the Horizon, Twenty One Pilots, and Hands Like Houses from their "schizophrenic-style rapped vocals, bellowing screams, and soaring clean vocals".

== Members ==
Current

- Emmy Mack – lead vocals (2017–present)
- Craig Wilkinson – guitars, programming (2017–present)
- Alex Powys – drums (2019–present)
- Ned Jankovic – bass (2019–present)

Former

- Dan McFeeters – drums (2018)
- Matt Coleman – bass (2017–2019; touring and studio member only)
- Maverick Burnett – bass (2019)

== Discography ==
=== Albums ===
List of albums, with selected chart positions
Title	Album details	Peak chart positions
Title	Album details	AUS
Postcard from a Living Hell	Released: 21 April 2023; Label: RedHook Records (RH001LP); Format: Digital download, streaming, LP, CD	(Note: Postcard from a Living Hell did not enter the ARIA Top 50 Album Chart, but peaked at number 10 on the Australian Artists Album Chart.)
Mutation	Released: 22 November 2024; Label: RedHook Records (RH002); Format: Digital download, streaming, LP	15

=== Extended plays ===
List of extended plays
Title	EP details
Bad Decisions	Released: 23 April 2021; Label: Self-released; Format: Digital download, streaming

== Awards and nominations ==
=== ARIA Music Awards ===
The ARIA Music Awards is an annual awards ceremony held by the Australian Recording Industry Association. They commenced in 1987.

Year	Nominee / work	Award	Result	Ref.
2025	Mutation	Best Hard Rock/Heavy Metal Album	Nominated	

=== AIR Awards ===
The Australian Independent Record Awards (commonly known informally as AIR Awards) is an annual awards night to recognise, promote and celebrate the success of Australia's Independent Music sector.

Year	Nominee / work	Award	Result	Ref.
2022	Bad Decisions	Best Independent Punk Album or EP	Nominated	
2024	Postcard from a Living Hell	Best Independent Heavy Album or EP	Nominated	
2025	Mutation	Best Independent Heavy Album or EP	Nominated	
