= Hands Like Houses =

Australian rock band

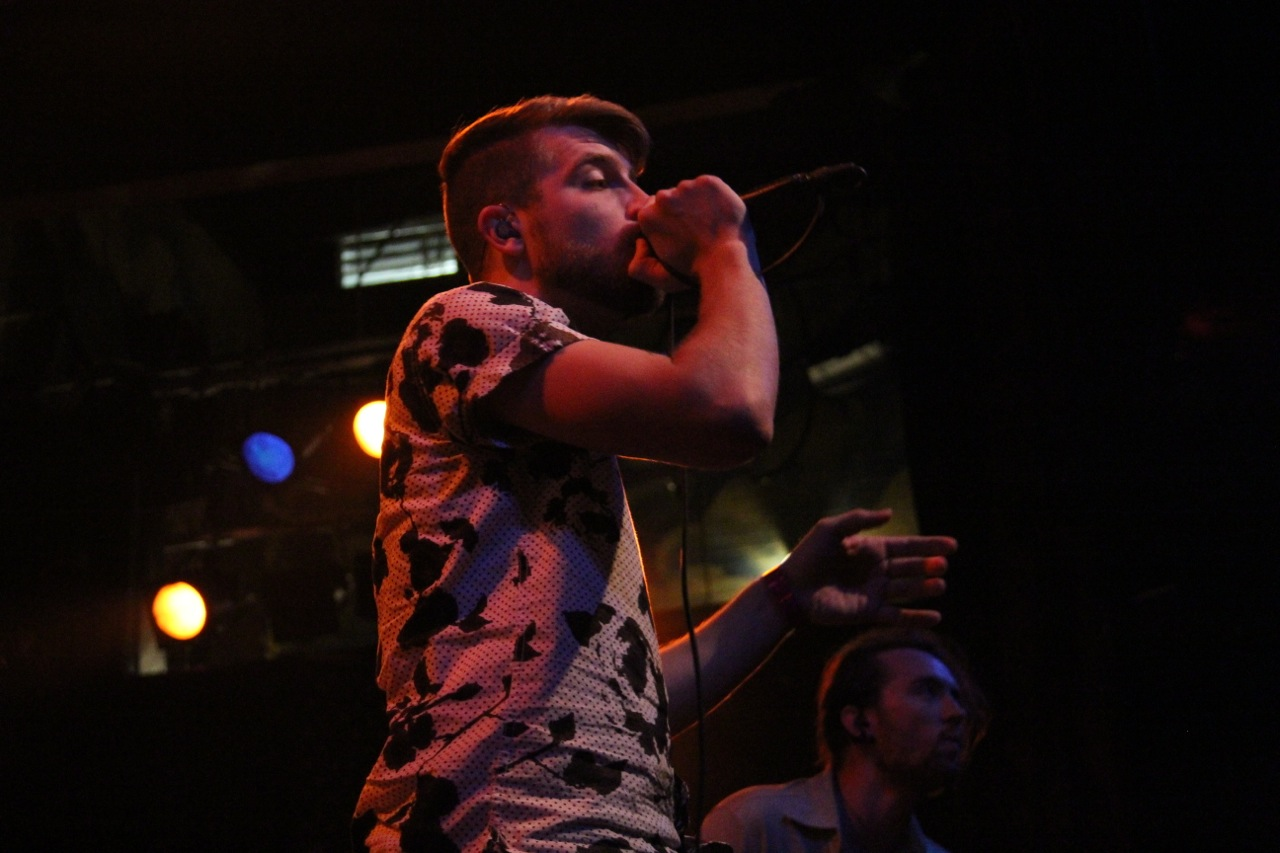
- Former vocalist Trenton Woodley performing in 2015

Background information
- Origin: Canberra, Australian Capital Territory, Australia
- Genres: Post-hardcore; pop-punk; experimental rock; emo; alternative rock
- Years active: 2008–present
- Labels: Cooking Vinyl Australia; UNFD; Hopeless; Rise
- Members: Matt Cooper; Alex Pearson; Joel Tyrrell; Matt Parkitny; Josh Raven
- Past members: Jamal Sabet: Trenton Woodley
- Website: handslikehouses.live

Hands Like Houses are an Australian rock band from Canberra. Formed in 2008, the group is currently independent. Their debut album, Ground Dweller, was released on 13 March 2012, charting at number 141 on the Billboard 200 and number 2 on the Billboard Heatseekers Albums chart. Their second album, Unimagine, was released on 23 July 2013, during their route on Warped Tour. The band's third album, Dissonants, was released on 26 February 2016, followed by their fourth, Anon, on 12 October 2018. Their fifth studio album, Atmospherics, was released on 14 February 2025, marking a return with a double album concept.

== History ==
=== Formation and Ground Dweller (2008–2013) ===
Formed in 2008 from the remnants of other local bands, So Long Safety and Eternal Debut, the band traveled to Orlando, Florida in the USA to record at Chango Studios with producer Cameron Mizell to work on their debut, Ground Dweller (which began as an EP, as stated by Woodley). However, the EP never was released and the band decided to re-record some of the tracks and record six new tracks for a full-length album. In 2011, the band released singles for "This Ain't No Place for Animals" and "Lion Skin" (which features a few differences from the one included in their full-length) on iTunes, garnering over 5,000 single sales. They also released a demo version of "One Hundred" in their PureVolume profile.

In January 2012 the band signed with Rise Records and released Ground Dweller, in March, streaming the entire album on the Alternative Press website. Ground Dweller debuted at No. 141 on the Billboard Top 200 and number 2 on the Billboard Heatseekers Chart. and has been generally well received. On 2 May, Hands Like Houses embarked on their first ever tour of the US on Rise Records' The Freshman Class of '12 Tour, supporting The Air I Breathe, Palisades and My Ticket Home.

In April 2012 released a video EP named Snow Sessions with acoustic performances of some songs from Ground Dweller. They toured in the United States with We Came as Romans and Attack Attack!, and in the fall of 2012 with Pierce the Veil and Sleeping with Sirens on the Collide with the Sky Tour. They joined Pierce the Veil and Woe, Is Me of May/June 2013.

=== Unimagine and Reimagine (2013–2014) ===
During a UK tour with Pierce the Veil and Woe, Is Me, Hands Like Houses performed new songs from Unimagine, including the lead single "Introduced Species". The album was released in July via Rise Records. The band performed on the entire 2013 Vans Warped Tour on the #Domo Stage., performing 'Introduced Species' and 'Shapeshifters' off the new album for the duration of the tour. The band released a video during this time for 'A Fire on a Hill', featuring a time lapse of an evolving mural painted by local Canberra artists Alex Lundy & Clare Jackson.

In 2014, the band went on multiple tours to support Unimagine. During February–March they supported Memphis May Fire across the USA with The Word Alive, A Skylit Drive and Beartooth, then completed their first UK headline tour in April supported by Crooks. On returning to the US in late April, the band supported Chiodos on the remaining dates of their 'Devil's Dance' tour, alongside Emarosa, Our Last Night and '68. In May, the band commenced their first headline run of the USA, supported by Slaves (Jonny Craig), Miss Fortune and Alive Like Me, before returning to Australia for a string of headline shows supported by Forever Ends Here, Breakaway and Far Away Stables. During this period, the band released their third music video for 'A Tale of Outer Suburbia', directed by Joshua Aylett.

After a brief break, in September 2014 the band announced a new EP of alternative versions from their previous album, Unimagine. As revealed by the band, Reimagine is a parallel and a rediscovery of Unimagine and we couldn’t be happier with the result." The E.P. was released 16 September 2014. Along with the announcement they released videos for each song from the EP, leading with "Revive (Introduced Species)". Keyboardist Jamal Sabet quietly left the band sometime in December to pursue other endeavors. To conclude their year, the band toured across the UK and Europe with British metalcore band Bury Tomorrow, with Slaves and In Hearts Wake supporting on the UK dates.

=== Dissonants (2015–2017) ===
In 2015 Hands Like Houses performed on Silverstein's Discovering the Waterfront 10 Year Anniversary Tour, alongside Beartooth, Major League and My Iron Lung. Prior to beginning the tour, the band recorded a new standalone single "I Am" with Erik Ron at Grey Area Studios in LA. On 12 March, the band teased a 30-second clip of a video clip for "I Am", produced by Megan Thompson, with the single to be released on 17 March. However, the band released the music video two days early on YouTube. The band entered the studio in March, recording their third album with James Paul Wisner (Underoath, Paramore, Go Radio, The Getaway Plan) in St Cloud, Florida. The album was released by Rise Records and UNFD, and was originally given a tentative release set for October 2015. The band toured on that year's Vans Warped Tour. They debuted a new song "New Romantics" as part of their set. Hands Like Houses appeared on the UK's renowned Download Festival in mid-June, as well as the entire US Vans Warped Tour in June–August. In addition, they have been announced as main support for Enter Shikari's Australian leg of The Mindsweep World Tour.

On 11 August the band announced via Facebook that their third album Dissonants would be released in October, and also announced a world tour. The band released the second single from Dissonants, "New Romantics", previously debuted while the band was on Warped Tour, in October. The band later debuted two new songs while on their Dissonants World Tour, "Glasshouse" and "Perspectives". In December, Hands Like Houses filled in for The Ghost Inside on the "Big Ass Tour" with A Day to Remember, The Amity Affliction, and Motionless in White after members of the Ghost Inside were injured in a bus crash. Later that month they announced pre-orders for their album would go on sale.

Dissonants was then released on 26 February 2016. A few days later, the band also announced that they would be joining Northlane and In Hearts Wake on their The Equinox Tour in Australia in June 2016. They also supported Northlane on their Intuition Tour in Australia in May 2017, and once again performed on the Warped Tour in the US in mid-2017. On 15 June 2017, the band released a standalone single "Drift" and announced that they had signed to Hopeless Records worldwide excluding Australia and New Zealand, where their partnership with UNFD continues.

=== Anon (2018–2020) ===
During the start of 2018, the band appeared at Unify festival in Tarwin Lower, and also embarked on the Resonants acoustic tour. On 26 July, the band announced they would be releasing their fourth studio album, Anon, on 12 October through Hopeless Records. The album's first single, "Overthinking", was also released on the same day. Four days later the band announced dates for a headlining tour across North America with Emarosa and Devour the Day. The album's second single, "Monster", was released on 13 August. On 1 October, WWE announced that "Monster" would be the official theme song for the WWE Super Show-Down pay-per-view on 6 October in Melbourne. The band released Anon on 12 October 2018 via UNFD. Wall of Sound reviewer Michael Parente scored the album 7.5/10, saying "this album is a refreshing take on the genre, with tight songwriting".

Their third single from Anon, "Sick", was released on 22 January 2019, alongside its music video. Hands Like Houses performed a national six-date tour to promote the album for February. They played across the major capital cities. Playing as support for the band was Ocean Grove, Endless Heights, and RedHook. On 24 July they released a remixed version of their track "Through Glass" with Samsaruh providing additional vocals. They then performed a tour across regional Australia in October.

=== Self-titled EP, departure of Woodley (2020–2023) ===
In August 2020, the band announced alongside the release "The Water" that they would be releasing their self-titled EP containing previously released single "Space" on October 23, 2020. The EP released through UNFD records to generally positive reviews. In December 2022, the band released the stand-alone single "Hurricane".

The band announced on 27 July 2023 that Woodley had left the band, citing a "difference in perspective", "friction", and "dysfunction", as the reasons for his dismissal. Woodley released his own statement shortly after, describing his departure as "unexpected" and claimed that the band had refused his request for a final run of shows to end his time with the band, but nevertheless wished the band well moving forward.

=== Hiring of Raven, Tropo and Strato EPs, and Atmospherics (2024–present) ===
In early 2024, Hands Like Houses announced the addition of Josh Raven, formerly of the Faim, as their new lead vocalist. This lineup change was marked by the release of the single "Heaven" on 5 December 2023. The band continued to release new music, including "Better Before" featuring Aaron Gillespie of Underoath on 31 January 2024, "Bloodrush" with Emmy Mack of RedHook on 21 February 2024, and "Paradise" featuring Matthew Wright of the Getaway Plan on 13 March 2024.

On 24 March 2024, Hands Like Houses released the four-track EP Tropo – Volume 1, exploring themes such as mental health struggles, societal disillusionment, and addiction. The EP's title references the troposphere. Following this, the band released another four-track EP titled Strato on 7 June 2024, continuing the themes of Tropo with tracks like "Hollow" addressing issues of numbness and mental health.

The band also collaborated with other artists on standalone singles, including "Obey" featuring Kellin Quinn of Sleeping With Sirens and "Hurts Like Hell", a collaboration with the Swedish rock band Normandie.

Hands Like Houses released their fifth studio album, Atmospherics, on 14 February 2025. The ambitious double album comprises 16 tracks divided into four sections: Tropo(sphere), Strato(sphere), Meso(sphere), and Thermo(sphere), each representing a different layer of the atmosphere and metaphorically reflecting the band's "journey through diverse creative spaces". The album was praised for its expansive sound and thematic depth, with "Better Before" highlighted as a standout track.

== Controversy ==
In September 2021, Hands Like Houses was dropped by UNFD Records due to serious sexual abuse and assault allegations made against one of the members and their family by a former partner. Frontman Trenton Woodley released a statement saying "The band is aware of the allegations and is taking them seriously." The band and label were legally prohibited from releasing details on the allegations, with Woodley also saying the band would release a statement when they were legally allowed. On 7 July 2022, as no charges were ever laid against the member, UNFD issued a statement about Hands Like Houses, apologising for any hurt and stress caused, whilst also acknowledging that the music industry is working out how to deal with allegations of this nature. The band posted a response to the statement the following day. The accuser was also linked to a case in 2019, where they made false sexual abuse allegations against a member of the band Good Doogs.

== Band members ==
Current

- Matt Cooper – lead guitar (2008–present)
- Alexander Pearson – rhythm guitar, backing vocals (2008–present)
- Joel Tyrrell – bass guitar, backing vocals (2008–present)
- Matt Parkitny – drums (2008–present)
- Josh Raven – lead vocals, keyboards, programming (2023–present)

Former

- Jamal Sabet – keyboards, programming (2008–2014)
- Trenton Woodley – lead vocals (2008–2023), keyboards, programming (2014–2023)

Timeline

== Discography ==
=== Studio albums ===
List of studio albums, with selected chart positions
Title	Album details	Peak chart positions					
Title	Album details	AUS	US	US Indie	US Alt	US Rock	US Hard Rock
Ground Dweller	Released: 13 March 2012; Label: Rise; Format: CD, LP, digital download, streaming	—	141	21	22	38	11
Unimagine	Released: 23 July 2013; Label: Rise; Format: CD, LP, digital download, streaming	51	37	6	6	10	4
Dissonants	Released: 27 February 2016; Label: Rise, UNFD; Format: CD, LP, digital download, streaming	7	68	6	7	9	3
Anon	Released: 12 October 2018; Label: Hopeless, UNFD; Format: CD, LP, digital download, streaming	4	—	11	—	—	—
Atmospherics	Released: 14 February 2025; Label: Hands Like Houses, Civilians; Format: CD, LP, digital download, streaming	36	—	—	—	—	—

=== Extended plays ===
List of EPs, with release date, label and selected chart positions shown
Title	EP details	Peak chart positions				
Title	EP details	AUS	US	US Indie	US Alt	US Rock
Snow Sessions	Released: 27 December 2012; Label: Self-released; Format: Digital download	—	—	—	—	—
Reimagine	Released: 16 September 2014; Label: Rise; Format: CD, digital download, streaming	—	109	23	20	34
Hands Like Houses	Released: 23 October 2020; Label: UNFD; Format: Digital download, streaming	—	—	—	—	—
Tropo	Released: 14 March 2024; Label: Hands Like Houses, Civilians; Format: Digital download, streaming	—	—	—	—	—
Strato	Released: 7 June 2024; Label: Hands Like Houses, Civilians; Format: Digital download, streaming	—	—	—	—	—
Meso	Released: 13 December 2024; Label: Hands Like Houses, Civilians; Format: Digital download, streaming	—	—	—	—	—
Thermo	Released: 14 February 2025; Label: Hands Like Houses, Civilians; Format: Digital download, streaming	—	—	—	—	—
Lótus	Released: 22 May 2026; Label: Hands Like Houses, Civilians; Format: Digital download, streaming, LP (August 2026)	5	—	—	—	—

=== Charted singles ===
List of charted singles, with year released, album, and selected chart positions shown
Title	Year	Peak chart positions	Album
Title	Year	US Main. Rock	Album
"Sick"	2019	34	Anon

=== Guest appearances ===
List of album appearances, with year released and album shown
Title	Year	Album	Notes
"Torn"	2014	Punk Goes 90s Vol. 2	Natalie Imbruglia cover
"Ana's Song (Open Fire)"	2017	Spawn (Again): A Tribute to Silverchair	Silverchair cover

=== Collaborations ===
Year	Song	Album	Artist
2011	"Consider the Thought" (feat. Trenton Woodley)	Resonance	Awaken I Am
2014	"Composure" (feat. Trenton Woodley)	Indulgence: A Saga of Lights	SycAmour
2015	"Dead Giveaway" (feat. Trenton Woodley)	Permanence	Storm the Sky
2016	"Cold Water (Major Lazer & Justin Bieber Cover)" (feat. Trenton Woodley & Garrett Rapp)	Single	Our Last Night
2019	"MNSTR" (feat. Trenton Woodley)	MNSTR	King Lotus

== Awards and nominations ==
=== AIR Awards ===
The Australian Independent Record Awards (commonly known informally as AIR Awards) is an annual awards night to recognise, promote and celebrate the success of Australia's Independent Music sector.

Year	Nominee / work	Award	Result	Ref.
2026	Atmospherics	Best Independent Heavy Album or EP	Nominated	

=== National Live Music Awards ===
The National Live Music Awards (NLMAs) are a broad recognition of Australia's diverse live industry, celebrating the success of the Australian live scene. The awards commenced in 2016.

Year	Nominee / work	Award	Result
2017	Hands Like Houses	Best Live Act of the Year - People's Choice	Nominated
2019	Hands Like Houses	Live Hard Rock Act of the Year	Nominated
