= Gardens (album) =

Studio album by Sly Withers
- Released: 11 June 2021
- Studio: Hopping Mouse Studio (Fremantle, Western Australia); Templeman Audio (Mount Hawthorn, Perth, Western Australia); Forensic Audio (Perth, Western Australia)
- Genre: Punk
- Length: 41:30
- Label: Dew Process
- Producer: Matthew Templeman

Sly Withers chronology
Sly Withers (2016)	Gardens (2021)	Overgrown (2022)

Singles from Gardens
- 1. "Cracks" Released: 27 August 2020; 2. "Bougainvillea" Released: 25 November 2020; 3. "Clarkson" Released: 7 April 2021; 4. "Breakfast" Released: 28 July 2021

Gardens is the second studio album by Australian punk rock band Sly Withers. Gardens was announced on 7 April 2021, alongside the release of second single "Clarkson" and released on 11 June 2021 through Dew Process. Gardens debuted at number 10 on the ARIA Albums Chart, becoming the band's debut chart appearance in their home country.

Gardens was recorded across various studios in Western Australia, including Hopping Mouse Studio in Fremantle, Templeman Audio in Mount Hawthorn, Perth, and at Forensic Audio, in Perth, where it was mastered by Simon Struthers.

On 4 June 2021, the band were featured on Triple J's Like a Version segment, where they performed a cover of Coldplay's "The Scientist", alongside a performance of their own song "Clarkson".

Alongside the album's announcement, Sly Withers revealed that they had collaborated with West Australian boardmaker Shreadnaught Surfboards, to create a unique surfboard, which would be gifted to a recipient who pre-ordered the album.

== Critical reception ==
Professional ratings
Review scores
Source	Rating
The AU Review	4/5 stars

Calling it a "bold, widescreen punk epic well worth diving into", Guitar World journalist Matt Doria wrote: "the band wade through a jungle of peaks and valleys across its 12 tracks, ebbing and flowing between heartrending slow-burners and big, mosh-ready punk anthems."

Labelling it "career-defining", Hayden Davies of Pilerats stated that "the album's 12 songs capture the versatility of Sly Withers and their strengths across a broad range of sounds, leaning towards the punkier side of their discography as a start-to-finish record, but still flourishing in touches from elsewhere."

Dylan Marshall of The AU Review opined: "Gardens is all things Sly Withers. It's a solid and complete 12 songs that will go some way in entrenching the band's place as not only one of Perth's best bands, but more importantly, a front runner in the Australian emo-punk scene."

=== Mid-year lists ===
Gardens on mid-year lists
Publication	List	Rank	Ref.
The Music	The Music's Top 25 Albums Of 2021 (So Far)	—N/a	

== Commercial performance ==
On 18 June 2021, Gardens debuted at number 10 on the ARIA Albums Chart for the chart dated 21 June, becoming their first appearance on the chart. Gardens furthermore debuted at number 4 on both the ARIA Top 20 Australian Albums Chart and the ARIA Top 20 Vinyl Albums Chart.

== Track listing ==
All tracks are written by Joel Neubecker, Shea Moriarty, Jono Mata and Sam Blitvich.

Gardens track listing
No.	Title	Producer(s)	Length
1.	"Cracks"	Matthew Templeman	3:27
2.	"Breakfast"	Templeman	2:54
3.	"My Bullshit"	Templeman	3:46
4.	"Taking Steps"	Templeman	3:52
5.	"Bougainvillea"	Templeman	3:02
6.	"Sleep on the Weekends"	Templeman	3:49
7.	"Clarkson"	Templeman	2:57
8.	"Glad"	Templeman	3:04
9.	"Constant Wreck"	Templeman	2:57
10.	"Turns Out"	Templeman	3:52
11.	"Keys"	Templeman	3:10
12.	"Positives"	Templeman	4:42
Total length:			41:30

Gardens (Deluxe) track listing
No.	Title	Length
13.	"The Scientist"	4:23
14.	"Selfish"	2:33
15.	"Tell Me Why"	2:50
16.	"Explode Into View"	3:09
17.	"Clarkson" (acoustic)	3:09
18.	"Keys" (acoustic)	3:00
19.	"Sleep On the Weekend" (piano version)	3:55

== Personnel ==
Adapted from the album's liner notes.

=== Musicians ===
Sly Withers

- Joel Neubecker – drums, writing (1–12)
- Shea Moriarty – bass, backing vocals, writing (1–12)
- Jono Mata – guitar, vocals, writing (1–12)
- Sam Blitvich – guitar, vocals, writing (1–12)

Other musicians

- Matthew Templeman – backing vocals (5, 7, 12)
- Rachel Carter – backing vocals (7)
- Lachlan Dowson – backing vocals (12)

=== Technical ===
- Matthew Templeman – production (1–12)
- Fraser Cringle – drum tech, additional engineering (1–12)
- Simon Struthers – mastering (1–12)

=== Artwork and design ===
- Mike Dann – photography
- Annie Walter – design, layout
- Tim Elphick – studio shots

== Charts ==
Chart performance for Gardens
Chart (2021)	Peak position
Australian Albums (ARIA)	10

== Release history ==
Release history and formats for Gardens
Region	Date	Format	Label	Catalogue	Ref.
Various	11 June 2021	Digital download; streaming	Dew Process	Not applicable	
Australia	11 June 2021	CD	Dew Process	DEW9001355	
Australia	11 June 2021	LP	Dew Process	DEW9001355	
Various	19 November 2021 (Deluxe)	Digital download; streaming	Dew Process	Not applicable	
