= Sly Withers =

Australian punk rock band

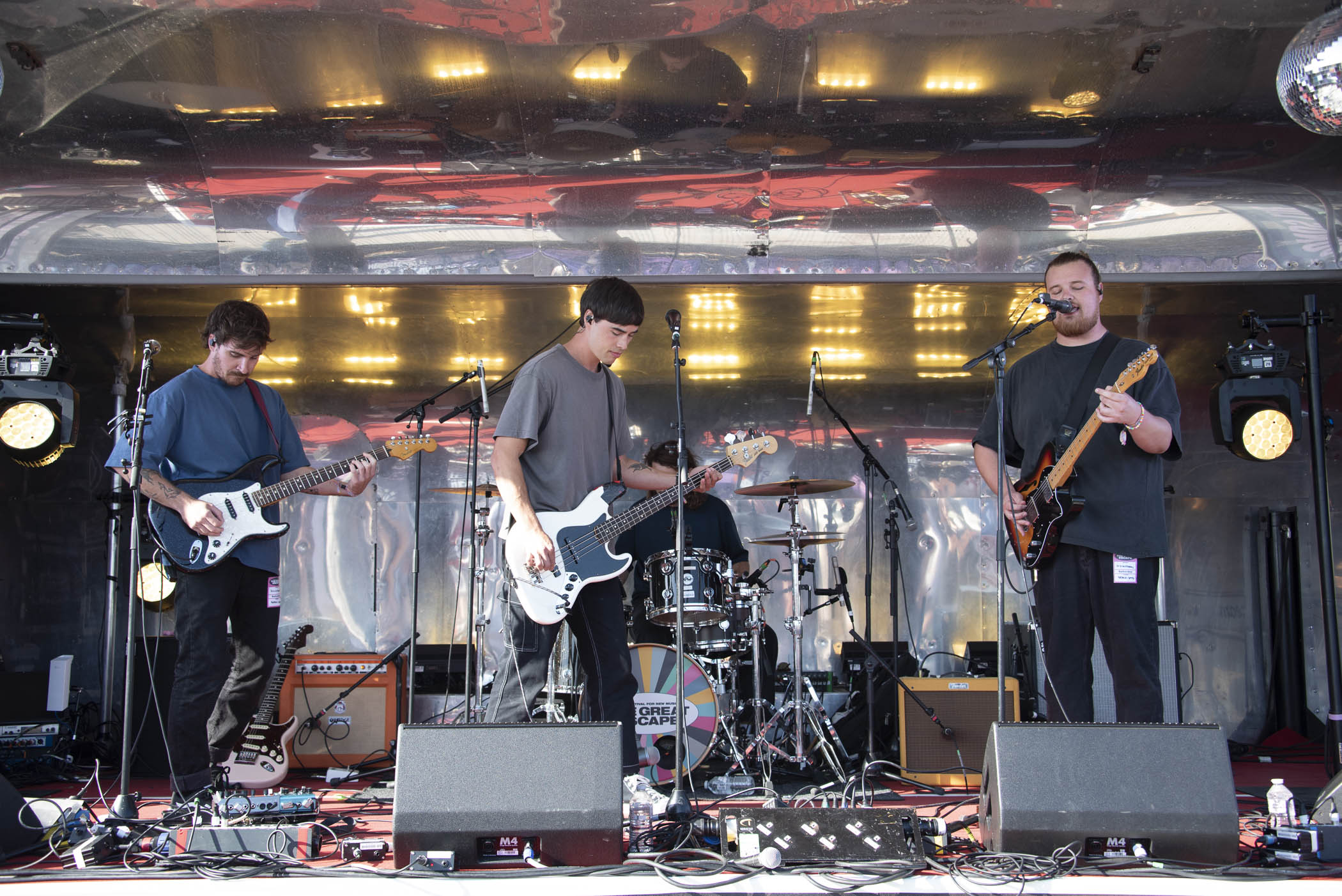
- Sly Withers performing in May 2025

Background information
- Origin: Perth, Western Australia, Australia
- Genres: Punk; indie punk
- Years active: 2013–present
- Labels: Smash House Records; Dew Process (2019-present)
- Members: Jono Mata; Sam Blitvich; Shea Moriarty; Fraser Cringle
- Past members: Joel Neubecker
- Website: slywithers.com

Sly Withers are an Australian alternative rock band from Perth, Western Australia. The band consists of vocalists/guitarists Jono Mata and Sam Blitvich, drummer Fraser Cringle and bassist Shea Moriarty. Joel Neubecker served as the band's drummer from their formation until his departure in December 2023. The original band members formed the band while still in high school. Their second studio album, Gardens, debuted and peaked at number 10 on the ARIA Chart on 21 June 2021. A single from the album, "Clarkson", placed in Triple J's Hottest 100 of 2021 at number 69.

The band's sound combines elements of rock, punk and emo, with The Music describing the band as "an exciting blend of introspection and euphoric indie punk".

== History ==
The band released their self-titled debut album in September 2016.

In March 2019, the band signed with Dew Process.

On 11 June 2021, the band released their second studio album, titled Gardens, which featured the singles "Cracks", "Bougainvillea" and "Clarkson". The album debuted at number 10 on the ARIA chart.

The band's fourth studio album, To Be Honest was released in April 2026.

== Band members ==
- Jono Mata – lead and backing vocals, guitar (2013–present)
- Sam Blitvich – lead and backing vocals, guitar (2013–present)
- Shea Moriarty – bass, backing vocals (2013–present)
- Fraser Cringle – drums (2024–present)

=== Former members ===
- Joel Neubecker – drums, backing vocals (2013–2023)

== Discography ==
=== Studio albums ===
List of studio albums, with release date and label, and selected chart positions shown
Title	Details	Peak chart positions
Title	Details	AUS
Sly Withers	Released: 11 October 2016; Label: Sly Withers (independent); Formats: CD+CD_ROM, digital download, streaming	—
Gardens	Released: 11 June 2021; Label: Dew Process (DEW9001355/DEW9001356); Formats: CD, LP, digital download, streaming	10
Overgrown	Released: 28 October 2022; Label: Dew Process (DEW9001530/DEW9001536); Formats: CD, LP, digital download, streaming	10
To Be Honest	Released: 10 April 2026; Label: Sly Withers (9362531138791); Formats: CD, LP, digital download, streaming	11

=== Extended plays ===
List of EPs, with release date and label shown
Title	Details
Mixtape	Released: September 2015; Label: Smash House Records; Formats: Digital download, streaming
Mixtape 2	Released: April 2016; Label: Sly Withers (independent); Formats: Digital download, streaming
Gravis	Released: 13 September 2019; Label: Dew Process; Formats: Digital download, streaming

== Awards and nominations ==
=== National Live Music Awards ===
The National Live Music Awards (NLMAs) are a broad recognition of Australia's diverse live industry, celebrating the success of the Australian live scene. The awards commenced in 2016.

Year	Nominee / work	Award	Result	Ref.
2020	Sly Withers	WA Live Act of the Year	Won	
2023	Sly Withers	Best Punk/Hardcore Act	Nominated	

=== West Australian Music Industry Awards ===
The West Australian Music Industry Awards (WAMIs) are an annual awards ceremony presented to the local contemporary music industry, held annually by Western Australian Music Industry Association Inc (WAM).

Year	Nominee / work	Award	Result	Ref.
2019	Themselves	Best Punk / Hardcore Act	Won	
