= I Don't Wanna Leave (Rüfüs Du Sol song) =

Single by Rüfüs Du Sol

from the album Surrender
- Released: 22 October 2021
- Length: 4:29
- Label: Rose Avenue; Reprise
- Songwriter(s): Jason Evigan; Jon George; Tyrone Lindqvist; James Hunt
- Producer(s): Jason Evigan; Jon George; Tyrone Lindqvist; James Hunt

Rüfüs Du Sol singles chronology
"On My Knees" (2021)	"I Don't Wanna Leave" (2021)

"I Don't Wanna Leave" is a song by Australian alternative dance group Rüfüs Du Sol, released on 22 October 2021 as the fourth single from their fourth studio album, Surrender. The Katzki directed music video premiered the same day. The song debuted a number 70 on the ARIA Charts.

At the 2022 ARIA Music Awards, the song as nominated for Best Video.

== Reception ==
In an album review, Cat Woods from NME Australia said "[Lindqvist's] brooding vocals sound otherworldly, both melodic and melancholic in equal measure."

Also in an album review, Ryan Middleton from Magnetic Magazine said "The track has all the makings of a new set closer as Tyrone Lindqvist exclaims 'I don't want to leave right now, stay with me for one more night.'"

== Track listings ==
album version
No.	Title	Length
1.	"I Don't Wanna Leave"	4:29

Digital single (Innellea remix)
No.	Title	Length
1.	"I Don't Wanna Leave" (Innellea remix)	6:23

== Charts ==
Chart performance for "I Don't Wanna Leave"
Chart (2021)	Peak position
Australia (ARIA)	70
New Zealand Hot Singles (RMNZ)	10
US Hot Dance/Electronic Songs (Billboard)	20
