= Josh (song) =

2021 single by Peach PRC

Single by Peach PRC
- Released: 26 February 2021
- Length: 2:40
- Label: Republic
- Songwriters: Sharlee Curnow; Liam Quinn
- Producer: Liam Quinn

Peach PRC singles chronology
"Colourblind" (2020)	"Josh" (2021)	"Symptomatic" (2021)

Music video
- "Josh" on YouTube

"Josh" is a song by Australian singer and songwriter Peach PRC. It was released on 26 February 2021. Josh peaked at number 38 on the ARIA Charts.

Upon release, Peach PRC said:

I've been wanting to put out this song forever. It's very special to me, because it captured a real moment. I was a bit down when I was writing one day. My ex, Josh, kept calling me over and over again. He called all of the time, because he was trying to get back with me. I thought I had blocked him though. Since he didn't stop bothering me, I wrote the song about him. It's a true story, but it’'s still meant to be fun and colourful.

At the APRA Music Awards of 2022, the song was nominated for Most Performed Pop Work.

== Track listing ==
- Digital download and streaming
1. "Josh" – 2:40
- Digital download and streaming
1. "Josh" (acoustic) – 2:33
2. "Josh" – 2:40
- 7" (2023 RSD limited edition)
1. "Josh" – 2:40

== Charts ==
Chart performance for "Josh"
Chart (2021)	Peak position
Australia (ARIA)	38
New Zealand Hot Singles (RMNZ)	9

== Certifications ==
Certifications for "Josh"
Region	Certification	Certified units/sales
Australia (ARIA)	Platinum	70,000^{‡}
^{‡} Sales+streaming figures based on certification alone.
