= Alive (Rüfüs Du Sol song) =

Single by Rüfüs Du Sol

from the album Surrender
- Released: 13 July 2021
- Length: 5:34
- Label: Rose Avenue; Reprise
- Songwriters: Jason Evigan; Jon George; Tyrone Lindqvist; James Hunt
- Producers: Jason Evigan; Jon George; Tyrone Lindqvist; James Hunt

Rüfüs Du Sol singles chronology
"Treat You Better" (2018)	"Alive" (2021)	"Next to Me" (2021)

"Alive" is a song by Australian alternative dance group Rüfüs Du Sol, released on 13 July 2021 as the lead single from their fourth studio album, Surrender. The song debuted at number 62 on the ARIA Charts.

In a press statement, frontman Tyrone Lindqvist said "It's a heavier song in some ways, but at its core it's hopeful."

At the 2021 ARIA Music Awards, the song earned the group wins for Best Group and Best Dance Release And at the 2022 Grammy Awards, the song won Best Dance/Electronic Recording

== Reception ==
Emma Mack from Music Feeds said "Their new single 'Alive' is dark and brooding, with broken beat percussion and haunting synths foregrounding intensely personal lyrics inspired by the highs and lows of a year in lockdown. It's underscored, however, by an energy and euphoria that seems destined to uplift dance floors when the trio return to them."

Tyler Jenke from Rolling Stone Australia said "'Alive' is Rüfüs Du Sol at their absolute best, showcasing haunting lyricism, mesmerising broken beat percussion, and ultimately captures the all-too familiar highs and lows of the year that has been."

== Track listings ==
Digital single
No.	Title	Length
1.	"Alive"	5:34

Digital single (Remixes)
No.	Title	Length
1.	"Alive" (Solomun remix)	8:54
2.	"Alive" (Anyma remix)	5:11
3.	"Alive" (Solomun remix edit)	4:29

== Charts ==
=== Weekly charts ===
Weekly chart performance for "Alive"
Chart (2021)	Peak position
Australia (ARIA)	62
New Zealand Hot Singles (RMNZ)	16
US Hot Dance/Electronic Songs (Billboard)	18
US Rock & Alternative Airplay (Billboard)	37

=== Year-end charts ===
Year-end chart performance for "Alive"
Chart (2021)	Position
US Hot Dance/Electronic Songs (Billboard)	99
