= Next to Me (Rüfüs Du Sol song) =

Single by Rüfüs Du Sol

from the album Surrender
- Released: 11 August 2021
- Length: 5:15
- Label: Rose Avenue; Reprise
- Songwriters: Jon George; Tyrone Lindqvist; James Hunt
- Producers: Jon George; Tyrone Lindqvist; James Hunt

Rüfüs Du Sol singles chronology
"Alive" (2021)	"Next to Me" (2021)	"On My Knees" (2021)

"Next to Me" is a song by Australian alternative dance group Rüfüs Du Sol, released on 11 August 2021. as the second single from their fourth studio album, Surrender (2021). Jon George said it "is a song of devotion, caring compassion and pure love" and told Triple J it's "a throwback to what we love doing: this four-to-the-floor house music with a big loving vocal over the top." The song debuted at number 60 on the ARIA Singles Chart.

== Reception ==
Al Newstead from ABC called the song "a bittersweet banger" saying "Beginning with some spare piano notes, the atmospheric production and Tyrone's romantic vocals captures those pandemic blues of missing loved ones locked away across borders."

Tyler Jenkins from Rolling Stone Australia said "Showcasing the outfit's inimitable ability to straddle the dualities of light and dark, 'Next to Me' sees the group promoting a level of maturity not quite seen before. Focused on themes of devotion and compassion, it's a self-described 'feel-good' track which stands in contrast to the sort of haunting atmosphere promoted on 'Alive'".

Juan Llorens from We Rave You said "The subtle yet powerful buildups lead into a minimalistic-sounding house drop that, in Rüfüs Du Sol style, is filled with emotion, euphoria, and a sense of escapism".

Rob Mullineau from OZ EDM called the song "Deep and enthralling" praising the "intensity of synths" calling them "truly something to behold".

== Track listings ==
Digital single
No.	Title	Length
1.	"Next to Me"	5:14

Digital single (Remixes)
No.	Title	Length
1.	"Next to Me" (Vintage Culture remix)	6:22
2.	"Next to Me" (Adana Twins 'A Night at Revolver' remix)	7:49
3.	"Next to Me"	5:14

== Charts ==
=== Weekly charts ===
Weekly chart performance for "Next to Me"
Chart (2021)	Peak position
Australia (ARIA)	60
New Zealand Hot Singles (RMNZ)	22
US Hot Dance/Electronic Songs (Billboard)	19

=== Year-end charts ===
Year-end chart performance for "Next to Me"
Chart (2021)	Position
US Hot Dance/Electronic Songs (Billboard)	97

== Certifications ==
Certifications for "Next to Me"
Region	Certification	Certified units/sales
New Zealand (RMNZ)	Gold	15,000^{‡}
^{‡} Sales+streaming figures based on certification alone.
