= Peach PRC =

Australian pop musician (born 1997)

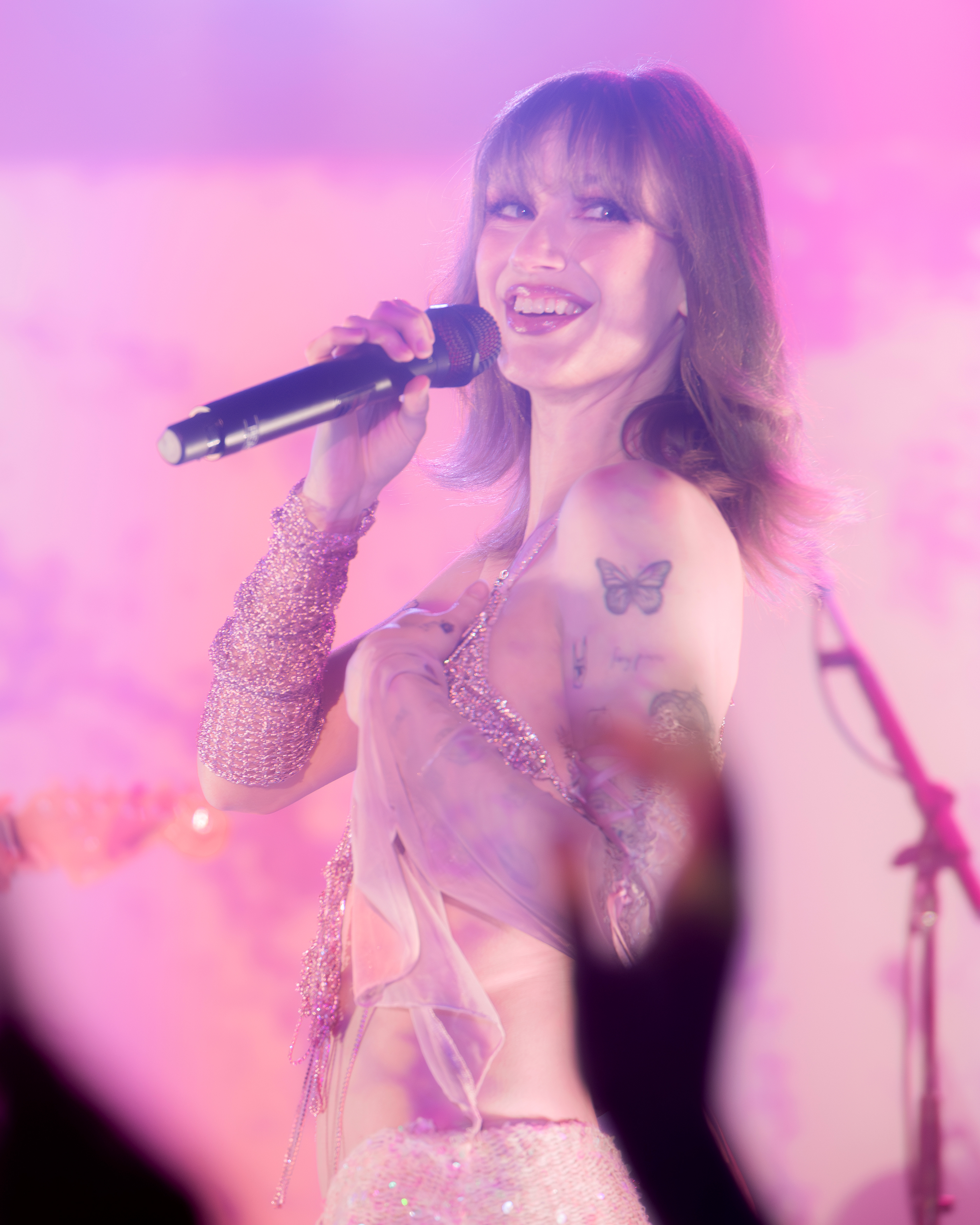
- Peach PRC performing in September 2025

Background information
- Also known as: Shaylee Curnow
- Born: Sharlee Jade Curnow; 2 April 1997 (age 29); Adelaide, South Australia, Australia
- Genre: Pop
- Occupations: Singer; songwriter; social media personality; stripper
- Instruments: Vocals, Omnichord
- Years active: 2019–present
- Labels: Republic; Island Australia
- Website: peachprc.com

Sharlee Jade "Shaylee" Curnow (born 2 April 1997), known professionally as Peach PRC, is an Australian pop singer, songwriter, and social media personality. Her major label debut single "Josh" was released in early 2021, which peaked at number 38 on the ARIA Singles Chart. Peach is a prominent figure on the social media platform TikTok, where she posts content about her life, living with borderline personality disorder, self-care advice, overcoming addiction, and her music.

== Early life ==
Curnow was born and raised in the southern suburbs of Adelaide, South Australia. She chose her stage name due to her love of the colour pink, as an homage to Princess Peach, using the title during her time performing as a stripper.

She began using the suffix PRC on TikTok as an abbreviation for porcelain because she deemed the full word too long to type out.

In an interview with Echo Magazine, Curnow said: "I've been interested in music for as long as I could talk, really. I've always sang [sic] and wrote [sic] songs and even have songs written from when I was like 8 years old."

== Career ==
=== 2019–2020: "Blondes" and TikTok popularity ===
On 19 June 2019, Peach independently released her debut single "Blondes". She created a TikTok account in September 2019, subsequently attracting an audience after posting content about her life, self-care advice, and her music. Her second single "Colourblind" was released on 2 May 2020. She said that the inspiration for the song "came from [her] synaesthesia and mine happens to be with colours and music; so I wanted to write a song that involved the colours I saw when singing it."

=== 2021–2024: "Josh", Republic Records signing and debut EP ===
On 21 February 2021, The Music Network confirmed Peach had signed with Island Records in Australia and Republic Records in the US. Her debut major label single "Josh" was released on 26 February 2021. Discussing the song, she said: "It's very special to me, because it captured a real moment. I was a bit down when I was writing one day. My ex, Josh, kept calling me over and over again. He called all of the time, because he was trying to get back with me. I thought I had blocked him though. Since he didn't stop bothering me, I wrote the song about him. It's a true story, but it's meant to be fun and colourful." The song debuted at number 38 on the ARIA Singles Chart. On 25 June, Peach released the single "Symptomatic". On 22 October, Peach released the two-track single "I've Been Bad, Santa" / "Christmas Kinda Sucks". On 5 November, Curnow released the single "Heavy". On 10 January 2022, Curnow leaked a song on her TikTok called "God Is a Freak", without telling her label. The snippet went viral and after fan demand, the song was released on 4 February 2022.

On 3 February 2023, Peach announced her debut extended play, Manic Dream Pixie, which was released on 28 April 2023. Peach's EP entered the ARIA Albums Chart at number 1 on 5 May 2023.

The compilation Chapter 1: Singles Collection was released in November 2024.

=== 2025–present: New singles and debut studio album ===
In July 2025, Peach released the single "Sweet n Low". In November 2025, Peach released "Miss Erotica", the first single of her debut studio album Porcelain, which she announced in December 2025 alongside the release of the second single of the album, "Out Loud". Peach released the third single of the album, "Back to You", on 15 January 2026. Porcelain was released on 6 April 2026.

== Personal life ==
Curnow came out as a lesbian on 16 January 2022. She had previously identified as bisexual. On 9 February 2021, she was featured on Abbie Chatfield's It's a Lot podcast, during which she discussed coming to terms with her sexuality, stating: "every gay person I knew, or bi person, was like 'yeah I always knew. I've known it since I was little.' I don't remember knowing from a young age that I liked girls."

In April 2022, Curnow revealed her birth name was Sharlee, as opposed to Shaylee, after her birth name was used on an APRA Music Awards poster shared on her Instagram. Commenters were quick to point out what they believed was a typo on the poster, but Curnow cleared up the confusion by revealing that it was the name on her birth certificate. Despite that, she continues to go by Shaylee in her personal life and is also credited professionally as Shaylee Curnow.

Curnow has been open about her battles with addiction in her TikTok videos, as well as her experiences with borderline personality disorder and ADHD, including hyperfixation.

=== Relationship with Alex Williamson ===
On 28 April 2021, Curnow posted an allegation on social media of abusive and predatory behaviour by her former boyfriend, Australian comedian Alex "Shooter" Williamson. Williamson responded in a series of stories on Instagram, claiming the allegations were "horse shit" and accusing PRC of domestic violence, recounting an incident in which she allegedly tried to kick down a door while he was on the toilet. Williamson was subsequently dropped by his management a day later, and the lineup of the Perth and Sydney comedy festivals on 3 May. Williamson has rebuked all claims. Following the allegations against him, Instagram removed Williamson's profile. Williamson claimed this was the second time Curnow had attempted to "deplatform" him, after which she removed the posts.

== Public image ==
Curnow has been credited as one of the most successful Australian creators on TikTok, with 2 million followers and more than 100 million likes on the social media platform.

== Discography ==
- Manic Dream Pixie (2023)
- Porcelain (2026)

== Tours ==
- Peach PRC (2023)
- The Secret PRC Tour (2024)
- Wandering Sprit Tour (2026)

== Awards and nominations ==
=== APRA Awards ===
The APRA Awards are held in Australia and New Zealand by the Australasian Performing Right Association to recognise songwriting skills, sales and airplay performance by its members annually.

Year	Nominee / work	Award	Result	Ref.
2022	"Josh"	Most Performed Pop Work	Nominated	

=== ARIA Music Awards ===
The ARIA Music Awards is an annual award ceremony event celebrating the Australian music industry.

Year	Nominee / work	Award	Result	Ref.
2023	"Perfect for You"	Best Pop Release	Nominated	
2023	Kyle Caulfield for Peach PRC – "Manic Dream Pixie"	Best Video	Nominated	
2023	Peach PRC, Billy Zammit for Peach PRC – Manic Dream Pixie	Best Cover Art	Nominated	
2024	Josh Harris for Peach PRC - "Time of My Life"	Best Video	Nominated	

=== National Live Music Awards ===
The National Live Music Awards (NLMAs) commenced in 2016 to recognise contributions to the live music industry in Australia.

Year	Nominee / work	Award	Result	Ref.
2023	Peach PRC	Best Pop Act	Nominated	

=== Rolling Stone Australia Awards ===
The Rolling Stone Australia Awards are awarded annually in January or February by the Australian edition of Rolling Stone magazine for outstanding contributions to popular culture in the previous year.

Year	Nominee / work	Award	Result	Ref.
2022	Peach PRC	Best New Artist	Nominated	
2024	Manic Dream Pixie	Best Record	Nominated	
2024	"Perfect for You"	Best Single	Won	
