= Jason Evigan =

American songwriter and actor

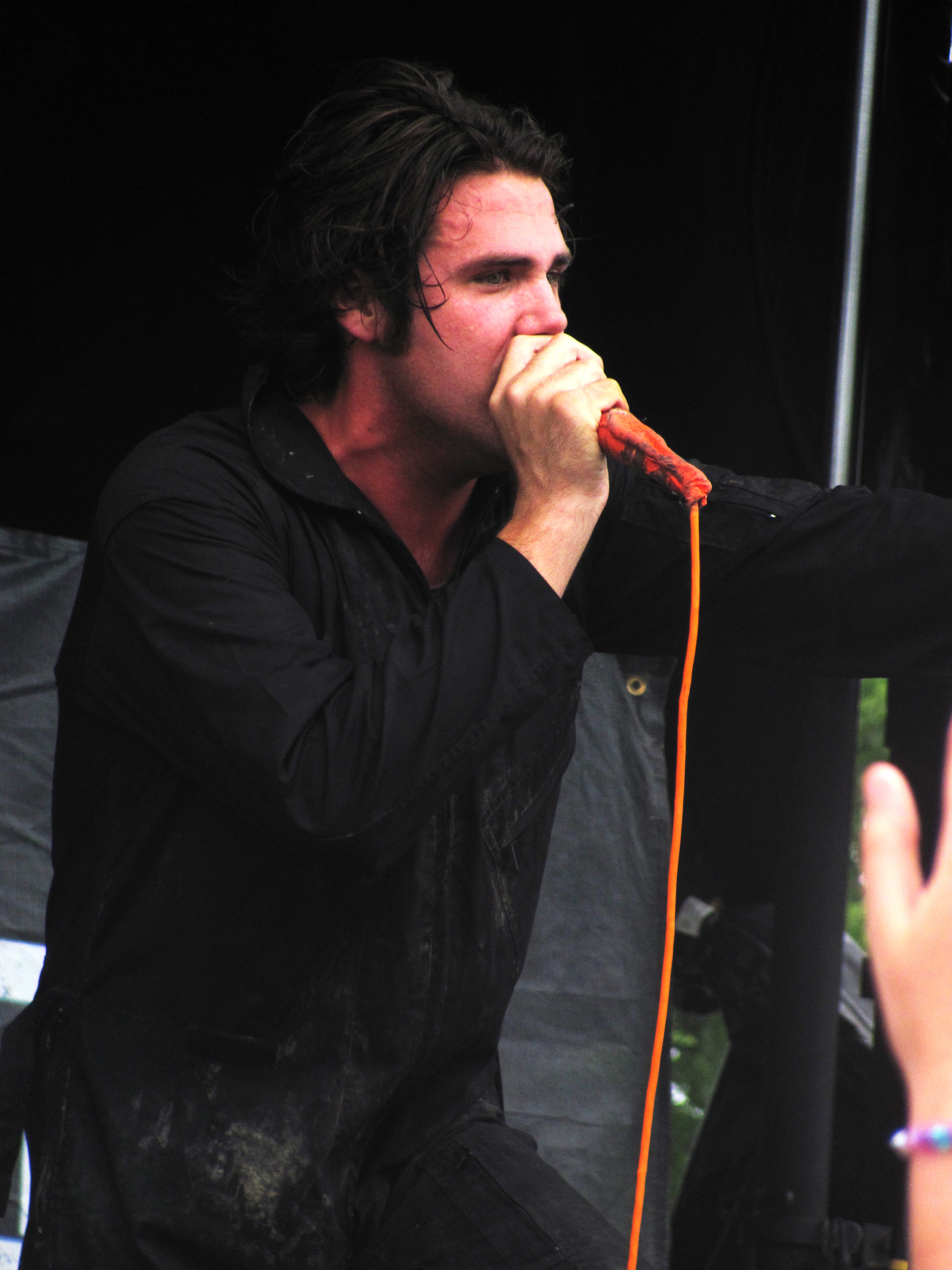
- Evigan performing with After Midnight Project at the 2010 Warped Tour

Background information
- Born: Jason Gregory Evigan; June 10, 1983 (age 43); Los Angeles, California, United States
- Genres: Pop; electronic; hip hop; rock
- Occupations: Singer; songwriter; record producer
- Years active: 2006–present
- Formerly of: After Midnight Project

Jason Gregory Evigan (born June 10, 1983) is an American singer, songwriter, and record producer best known as the vocalist for the rock band After Midnight Project, which was formed in 2004 before disbanding in 2012.

His songwriting or production credits include the singles "Girls Like You" and "What Lovers Do" by Maroon 5, "Physical" by Dua Lipa, "Ghosttown" by Madonna, "Heart Attack" by Demi Lovato, "Talk Dirty" by Jason Derulo, "Lovers on the Sun" by David Guetta, and "Shed a Light" by Robin Schulz.

== Early and personal life ==
Evigan was born in Los Angeles, California, the only son of Pamela C. Serpe, a dancer, model, and actress, and actor Greg Evigan. He has Polish and Italian heritage. He is the middle of three siblings, with elder sister Vanessa and younger sister Briana, both of whom are actresses. In August 2011, he married Victoria Janzen, with whom he has two children. The couple began a music project called Elephant Heart, and released singles such as "Hiya" and "Warfare" in 2018.

== Career ==
He has worked with numerous recording artists including Maroon 5, Kelly Clarkson, Demi Lovato, Avicii, Madonna, Nick Jonas, Kiiara, Zedd, Rufus Du Sol, Bebe Rexha, Skylar Grey, Jon Bellion, Starrah, Troye Sivan, Julia Michaels and Britney Spears. He has also produced records with Selena Gomez, Fifth Harmony, Zendaya, and Lupe Fiasco.

Prior to his career as a writer and producer, Evigan was the lead singer of the Los Angeles-based band After Midnight Project. The band released one album and four EPs. They participated in the Warped Tour and played with artists including Chevelle, Red Jumpsuit Apparatus, Papa Roach, Thirty Seconds to Mars, 10 Years, and Story of the Year.

Evigan is a member of the production duo "The Suspex" with fellow writer and producer Mitch Allan. The pair have penned numerous hits including Demi Lovato's "Heart Attack". Evigan credits his entry into pop songwriting to Disney A&R executive Mio Vukovic after Vukovic introduced him to Demi Lovato. Evigan went on to have four songs on Demi and two on Selena Gomez's debut album Stars Dance. In 2020, Evigan signed the deal with Sony/ATV Music Publishing.

== Discography ==
=== Songwriting and production credits ===
Title	Year	Artist(s)	Album	Credits	Written with	Produced with
"A Billion Hits"	2012	Ross Lynch	Austin & Ally	Co-writer	Mitch Allan	-
"Talk Dirty" (featuring 2 Chainz)	2013	Jason Derulo	Tattoos	Co-writer	Jason Desrouleaux, Taheed Epps, Eric Frederic, Sean Douglas, Ori Kaplan, Tamir Muskat, Tomer Yosef	-
"Miss Movin' On"	2013	Fifth Harmony	Better Together EP	Co-writer/Producer	Mitch Allan, Lindy Robbins, Julia Michaels	Mitch Allan
"Better Together"	2013	Fifth Harmony	Better Together EP	Co-writer	Harmony Samuels, Savan Kotecha, Patrick Bianco	-
"Leave My Heart Out of This"	2013	Fifth Harmony	Better Together EP	Co-writer/Producer	Tebey Ottoh, Marcus Lomax, Stefan Johnson, Jordan Johnson	The Monsters and the Strangerz
"Power"	2013	Kat Graham	Non-album single	Co-writer/Producer	Katerina Graham, Mitch Allan, Julia Michaels, Sean Douglas	Mitch Allan
"Buffalo Bill"	2013	Moxie Raia	Non-album single	Producer	-	Freddy Wexler
"Kids Itz Kinetic"	2013	Kate Crash	Non-album single	Co-writer/Producer	-	-
"Heart Attack"	2013	Demi Lovato	Demi	Co-writer/Producer	Mitch Allan, Sean Douglas, Nikki Williams, Aaron Phillips, Demetria Lovato	Mitch Allan
"Made in the USA"	2013	Demi Lovato	Demi	Co-writer/Producer	Demetria Lovato, Jonas Jeberg, Corey Chorus, Blair Perkins	Jonas Jeberg
"Two Pieces"	2013	Demi Lovato	Demi	Co-writer/Producer	Olivia Waithe, Mitch Allan	Mitch Allan
"Never Been Hurt"	2013	Demi Lovato	Demi	Co-writer/Producer	Demetria Lovato, Alexandra Tamposi, Jordan Johnson, Marcos Lomax, Stefan Johnson	The Monsters and the Strangerz
"Forget Forever"	2013	Selena Gomez	Stars Dance	Co-writer/Producer	Clarence Coffee Jr., Alexander Izquerdio, Jordan Johnson, Stefan Johnson, Marcus Lomax	The Monsters and the Strangerz, Dan Book
"Save the Day"	2013	Selena Gomez	Stars Dance	Co-writer/Producer	Mitch Allan, Olivia Waithe	Mitch Allan
"Cruisin' for a Bruisin'"	2013	Ross Lynch Jason Evigan, Grace Phipps	Teen Beach Movie (Soundtrack)	Co-writer/Producer	Jason C. Miller, Mitchell Allan Scherr, Nikki Leonti	Mitch Allan
"Butterflies"	2013	Zendaya	Zendaya	Co-writer/Producer	Sam Watters, Jordan Johnson, Marcus Lomax, Stefan Johnson	The Monsters and the Strangerz, Sam Watters
"Bottle You Up"	2013	Zendaya	Zendaya	Co-writer/Producer	Olivia Waithe, Mitch Allan	Mitch Allan
"It Was Always You"	2014	Maroon 5	V	Co-writer/Producer	Adam Levine, Sam Martin, Marcus Lomax, Jordan Johnson, Stefan Johnson	The Monsters and the Strangerz, Sam Martin, Isaiah Tejada
"Coming Back for You"	2014	Maroon 5	V	Co-writer/Producer	Adam Levine, Sam Martin, Marcus Lomax, Jordan Johnson, Stefan Johnson	The Monsters and the Strangerz, Sam Martin, Isaiah Tejada
"Dangerous" (featuring Sam Martin)	2014	David Guetta	Listen	Co-writer/Co-producer	Pierre Guetta, Giorgio Tuinfort, Sam Martin, Lindy Robbins	David Guetta, Giorgio Tuinfort, Sam Martin
"What I Did for Love" (featuring Emeli Sandé)	2014	David Guetta	Listen	Co-writer	Pierre Guetta, Giorgio Tuinfort, Breyan Stanley Issac, Sam Martin, Sean Douglas, Alicia Cook	-
"Lovers on the Sun" (featuring Sam Martin)	2014	David Guetta	Listen	Co-writer/Vocal producer	Pierre Guetta, Tim Bergling, Giorgio Tuinfort, Frederic Riesterer, Michael Einziger, Sam Martin	David Guetta, Avicii, Giorgio Tuinfort, Frederic Riesterer, Daddy's Groove
"Goodbye Friend" (featuring The Script)	2014	David Guetta	Listen	Co-writer	Pierre Guetta, Frederic Riesterer, Giorgio Tuinfort, Sam Martin, Sean Douglas, Breyan Stanley Issac, Danny O'Donoghue, Mark Sheehan, Zsolt Milichovszki, David Nagy	-
"Listen" (featuring John Legend)	2014	David Guetta	Listen	Co-writer	Pierre Guetta, Giorgio Tuinfort, Austin Bisnow, Frederic Riesterer, John Stephens, Sarah Rayne, Joaquin Banuelos	-
"Chains"	2014	Nick Jonas	Nick Jonas	Co-writer/Producer	Ammar Malik, Danny Parker	Nick Jonas
"Teacher"	2014	Nick Jonas	Nick Jonas	Co-writer/Producer	Ammar Malik, Danny Parker	Nick Jonas
"Don't Talk About Love"	2014	G.R.L.	G.R.L. EP	Co-writer/Producer	Mitch Allan, Lindy Robbins, Julia Michaels	Mitch Allan
"Fun" (featuring Chris Brown)	2014	Pitbull	Globalization	Co-writer/Producer	Armando Perez, Clarence Coffee Jr., Marcus Lomax, Jordan Johnson, Stefan Johnson, Alexander Izquerdio, Christopher Brown, Al Burna	The Monsters and the Strangerz
"Heartbeat Song"	2015	Kelly Clarkson	Piece by Piece	Co-writer	Kara DioGuardi, Audra Mae, Mitch Allan	-
"Ghosttown"	2015	Madonna	Rebel Heart	Co-writer/Producer	Madonna Ciccone, Sean Douglas, Evan Kidd Bogart	Madonna, Billboard
"Inside Out"	2015	Madonna	Rebel Heart	Co-writer	Madonna Ciccone, Sean Douglas, Evan Kidd Bogart, Michael Dean	-
"Cheyenne"	2015	Jason Derulo	Everything Is 4	Co-writer	Jason Desrouleaux, Ian Kirkpatrick, Sam Martin, Lindy Robbins, Marcus Lomax, Stefan Johnson, Jordan Johnson	-
"Get Ugly"	2015	Jason Derulo	Everything Is 4	Co-writer	Jason Desrouleaux, Eric Frederic, Sean Douglas	-
"When Love Hurts"	2015	JoJo	III EP	Co-writer/Producer	Benjamin Levin, Erin Wuthrich, Ammar Malik, Daniel Omelio	Benny Blanco
"Old Ways"	2015	Demi Lovato	Confident	Co-writer/Producer	Olivia Waithe, Scott Hoffman	Babydaddy, Mitch Allan
"Waitin for You" (featuring Sirah)	2015	Demi Lovato	Confident	Co-writer/Producer	Demetria Lovato, Julia Michaels, Steve McCucheon, Sara Mitchell	Steve Mac, Mitch Allan
"Papercut" (featuring Troye Sivan)	2015	Zedd	True Colors	Co-writer	Anton Zaslavski, Julia Michaels, Sam Martin, Lindy Robbins, Austin Paul Flores	-
"Daisy" (featuring Julia Michaels)	2015	Zedd	True Colors	Co-writer	Anton Sazlavski, Andreas Schuller, Julia Michaels, Danny Parker	-
"Who's With Me"	2016	Flo Rida	Non-album single	Co-writer/Producer	Tramar Dillard, Justin Franks, Alexander Izquerdio, Breyan Stanley Issac, Daniel Majic, Oliver Peterhof	DJ Frank E, Danny Majic, Breyan Issac, Nick Sweeley, Ryan Gladieux
"Voodoo"	2016	Nick Jonas	Last Year Was Complicated	Co-writer/Producer	Nicholas Jonas, Dewain Whitmore Jr.	-
"Champagne Problems"	2016	Nick Jonas	Last Year Was Complicated	Co-writer/Producer	Nicholas Jonas, Sean Douglas, Jonathan Tucker, Dewain Whitemore Jr.	-
"Good Girls" (featuring Big Sean)	2016	Nick Jonas	Last Year Was Complicated	Co-writer/Producer	Nicholas Jonas, Sean Douglas, Sean Andersson	-
"The Difference"	2016	Nick Jonas	Last Year Was Complicated	Co-writer/Producer	Nicholas Jonas, Dewain Whitmore Jr.	-
"Comfortable"	2016	Nick Jonas	Last Year Was Complicated	Co-writer/Producer	Nicholas Jonas	Nick Jonas
"Man on the Moon"	2016	Britney Spears	Glory	Co-writer/Producer	Ilsey Juber, Phoebe Ryan, Brandon Lowry, Marcus Lomax	Dan Book, Pat Thrall
"Liar"	2016	Britney Spears	Glory	Co-writer/Producer	Breyan Stanley Issac, Danny Parker, Nash Overstreet	-
"Still Standing"	2016	Tini	Tini	Co-writer/Producer	Lindy Robbins, Maureen McDonald	-
"Got Me Started"	2016	Tini	Tini	Co-writer/Producer	Jonnali Parmenius, Daniel Traynor	Grades
"My Stupid Heart"	2016	Tini	Tini	Co-writer	Billy Steinberg, Josh Alexander	-
"Don't Cry for Me"	2016	Tini	Tini	Co-writer/Producer	Ross Golan, Ammar Malik, Kevin Snevely	Kevin Svenely
"Sigo Adelante"	2016	Tini	Tini	Co-writer	Lindy Robbins, Maureen McDonald	-
"Si Tu de Vas"	2016	Tini	Tini	Co-writer	Billy Steinberg, Josh Alexander	-
"Morning in America"	2016	Jon Bellion	The Human Condition	Co-writer/Producer	Sean Douglas, Sam Martin, Ian Kirkpatrick, Jon Bellion	Ian Kirkpatrick, Jon Bellion, Mark Williams, Volta
"Gangsta"	2016	Kehlani	Suicide Squad: OST	Co-writer	Holly Hafferman, Jeremy Coleman, Jacob Lutrell, Kehlani Parrish, Andrew Swanson	-
"Wreak Havoc"	2016	Skylar Grey	Suicide Squad: OST	Co-writer/Producer	Holly Hafferman, Glenda "Gizzle" Proby	-
"Shed a Light" (with David Guetta featuring Cheat Codes)	2016	Robin Schulz	Uncovered	Co-writer	Pierre Guetta, John Ryan II, Dennis Bierbrodt, Jurgen Dohr, Guido Kramar, Giorgio Tuinfort, Jacob Kasher Hindlin, Ammar Malik, Robin Schulz	-
"Options" (featuring Stephen Marley)	2017	Pitbull	Climate Change	Co-writer	Armando Perez, Ian Kirkpatrick, Joshua Gallander, Mitch Allan, Sam Martin, Sean Douglas, Stephen Marley	-
"Educate Ya" (featuring Jason Derulo)	2017	Pitbull	Climate Change	Co-writer/Producer	Armando Perez, Ian Kirkpatrick, Lindy Robbins, Jordan Johnson, Stefan Johnson, Marcus Lomax	Ian Kirkpatrick, The Monsters and the Strangerz
"Bom Bidi Bom" (with Nicki Minaj)	2017	Nick Jonas	Fifty Shades Darker: OST	Co-writer/Producer	Breyan Stanley Issac, Marcel Botezan, Sebastian Barac, Onika Maraj	Breyan Issac
"Good Days"	2017	Shawn Hook	My Side of Your Story EP	Co-writer/Producer	Shawn Hlookof, Ammar Malik	Ammar Malik, Gian Stone
"Kanye's In My Head"	2017	Boy Epic	Non-album single	Co-writer/Producer	Matt Stallings, Cut Down Trees	Cut Down Trees
"Hoodie"	2017	Hey Violet	From the Outside	Co-writer/Producer	Julian Bunetta, Ross Golan, Jacob Kasher Hindlin, Ammar Malik, Daniel Omelio	Julian Bunetta
"Good Life" (with Kehlani)	2017	G-Eazy	The Fate of the Furious: OST	Co-writer/Producer	Gerald Gillum, Kehlani Parrish, Benjamin Diehl, Marco Rodriguez Diaz, Holly Hafferman, Justin Franks, Daniel Majic, Andrew Thomas, Moses Davies, Steven Marsden, Vanessa Carlton, Dean Mundy	DJ Frank E, Ben Billions, DJ Infamous, Danny Majic
"Mamacita" (featuring Rico Nasty)	2017	Lil Yachty	The Fate of the Furious: OST	Co-writer	Miles McCollum, Johnny Mitchell, Vincent Watson, Glenda Proby, Jocelyn Donald	-
"Ins and Outs"	2017	Sofia Carson	Non-album single	Co-writer/Producer	Julia Michaels, Justin Tranter	-
"Lonely Night"	2017	Fifth Harmony	Fifth Harmony	Co-writer/Producer	Oladayo Olatunji, Dinah Hansen, Normani Kordei, Jordan Johnson, Stefan Johnson, Marcus Lomax	The Monsters and the Strangerz
"Born for Greatness"	2017	Papa Roach	Crooked Teeth	Co-writer	Jacoby Shaddix, Jerry Horton, Tobin Esperance	-
"What Lovers Do" (featuring SZA)	2017	Maroon 5	Red Pill Blues	Co-writer/Producer	Adam Levine, Brittany Tahliah Hazzard, Solana Rowe, Oladayo Olatunji, Victor Radstrom, Elina Stridh	Sam Farrar, Mailbox, Ben Billions
"Lips on You"	2017	Maroon 5	Red Pill Blues	Co-writer/Producer	[Adam Levine, Charlie Puth, Jacob Kasher Hindlin, Julia Michaels	Charlie Puth
"Girls Like You"	2017	Maroon 5	Red Pill Blues	Co-writer/Producer	Adam Levine, Henry Walter, Brittany Tahliah Hazzard, Gian Stone	Cirkut
"Whole Heart"	2017	Rachel Platten	Waves	Co-writer/Producer	Rachel Platten, Brett McLaughlin	Gian Stone
"Collide"	2017	Rachel Platten	Waves	Producer	-	Busbee, Cameron Jaymes, Spencer Bastian
"Shivers"	2017	Rachel Platten	Waves	Co-writer/Producer	Rachel Platten, Sean Douglas	Chris Gehringer, Gian Stone
"Loose Ends"	2017	Rachel Platten	Waves	Co-writer/Producer	Rachel Platten, Sean Douglas	Gian Stone
"Grace"	2017	Rachel Platten	Waves	Co-writer/Producer	Rachel Platten, Nathaniel Cypert, Sean Douglas	Gian Stone
"Whatchachacha"	2017	Sage the Gemini	Morse Code	Co-writer	Dominic Woods, Thomas Eriksen, Sean Douglas	-
"Naked" (featuring Sam Martin)	2017	Robin Schulz	Uncovered	Co-writer/Producer	Robin Schulz, Sam Martin, Stefan Debruck, Guido Kramer, Dennis Beirbrodt, Ammar Malik, Jurgen Dohr, Joaquin Howard	Robin Schulz, Junxx, Sam Martin
"Juice"	2017	Chromeo	Head Over Heels	Co-writer/Producer	Patrick Gemayal, David Macklovitch, Sean Douglas	Chromeo, Chris "TEK" O'Ryan
"Trust"	2017	Boy Epic	Non-album single	Co-writer/Producer	Matt Stallings, Cut Down Trees	Cut Down Trees
"I Want a Miracle!"	2018	Frederic Riesterer	Non-album single	Co-writer	Frederic Riesterer, Sam Martin	-
"Must've Been" (featuring DRAM)	2018	Chromeo	Head Over Heels	Co-writer/Producer	Patrick Gemayel, David Macklovitch, Jacob Kasher Hindlin, Gamal Lewis, Isaiah Tejada, Ammar Malik, Shelly Massenburg-Smith, William Bastian	Chromeo, A-Trak, Gian Stone, Ash Harrison, Ben Maddahi
"Ferrari"	2018	Bebe Rexha	Expectations	Co-writer/Producer	Bleta Rexha, Asia Whiteacre	Gian Stone
"Steal My Thunder"	2018	Keith Urban	Graffiti U	Co-writer/Producer	Keith Urban, Emily Weisband, Jordan Minton	Keith Urban
"Same Heart"	2018	Keith Urban	Graffiti U	Co-writer/Producer	Keith Urban, Emily Weisband, Jordan Minton	Keith Urban
"LA Girls"	2018	Charlie Puth	Voicenotes	Co-writer	Charlie Puth, Jacob Kasher Hindlin, Sean Douglas	-
"One Track Mind"	2018	Chromeo	Head Over Heels	Co-writer/Producer	Patrick Gemayal, David Macklovitch, Gregory Evigan, Lindy Robbins, Scott Friedman, Talay Riley, Lennard Macaluso	Chromeo, A-Trak, Chris "TEK" O'Ryan, John Cunningham, Ash Harrison, Ben Maddahi
"Drowning"	2018	ZHU	Ringos Desert	Co-writer/Background vocals	ZHU	-
"She Knows How to Love Me" (featuring Jess Glynne & Stefflon Don)	2018	David Guetta	7	Co-writer/Producer	Pierre Guetta, Timothy Bergling, Giorgio Tuinfort, Frederic Riesterer, Nicholas Seeley, Relph Wegner, Jessica Glynne, Priscilla Renea Hamilton, Jonathan Reuven Rotem, Teal Douville, Stephanie Allen, Rakim Allen, Dorothy LaBostrie, Joseph Lubin, Richard Penniman	David Guetta, Avicii, Giorgio Tuinfort, Frederic Riesterer, J.R. Rotem, Teal Douville, Ralph Wegner
"That Song That We Used to Make Love To"	2018	Carrie Underwood	Cry Pretty	Co-writer	Hillary Lindsey	-
"No Place"	2018	Rüfüs Du Sol	Solace	Co-writer/Producer	Jon George, Tyrone Lindqvist, James Hunt	Jon George, Tyrone Lindqvist, James Hunt
"Underwater"	2018	Rüfüs Du Sol	Solace	Co-writer/Producer	Jon George, Tyrone Lindqvist, James Hunt	Jon George, Tyrone Lindqvist, James Hunt
"Lost in My Mind"	2018	Rüfüs Du Sol	Solace	Co-writer/Producer	Jon George, Tyrone Lindqvist, James Hunt	Jon George, Tyrone Lindqvist, James Hunt
"Treat You Better"	2018	Rüfüs Du Sol	Solace	Co-writer/Producer	Mark Foster, Jon George, Tyrone Lindqvist, James Hunt	Jon George, Tyrone Lindqvist, James Hunt
"Paris"	2018	Sabrina Carpenter	Singular: Act I	Co-writer/Producer	Sabrina Carpenter, Brett McLaughlin	Brett McLaughlin, Gian Stone
"Baby" (featuring Marina & Luis Fonsi)	2018	Clean Bandit	What Is Love?	Co-writer	Jack Patterson, Camille Purcell, Matthew Knott, Marina Diamandis, Luis Lopez-Cepero	To be confirmed
"Mama" (featuring Ellie Goulding)	2018	Clean Bandit	What Is Love?	Co-writer	Jack Patterson, Grace Chatto, Caroline Ailin, Elena Goulding	-
"Everything I Need"	2018	Skylar Grey	Aquaman	Producer	–	–
"Good Things Fall Apart"	2019	Illenium	Ascend	Co-Writer, Producer	Nicholas Miller, James Abrahart, Jon Bellion, Sarah Hudson	Illenium
"In Your Arms"	2019	Illenium	Ascend	Co-Writer, Producer	Nicholas Miller, Sam Martin, Stefan Johnson, Jordan Johnson, Alexander Izquerdio, Samuel Nelson Harris	Illenium
"Uglykid"	2019	Hobo Johnson	The Fall of Hobo Johnson	Co-Writer, Producer	Hobo Johnson, Derek Lynch, David Baez-Lopez	-
"Mover Awayer"	2019	Hobo Johnson	The Fall of Hobo Johnson	Co-Writer, Producer	Patrick Wimberly, Hobo Johnson	-
"Typical Story"	2019	Hobo Johnson	The Fall of Hobo Johnson	Co-Writer, Producer	Hobo Johnson	-
"All In My Head"	2019	Hobo Johnson	The Fall of Hobo Johnson	Co-Writer, Producer	Hobo Johnson	-
"Hate Me"	2019	Ellie Goulding	Brightest Blue	Co-Writer	Elena Goulding, Jarad Higgins, Jordan Johnson, Marcus Loma, Stefan Johnson, Andrew Wotman, Brittany Hazzard	watt, The Monsters and the Strangerz
"Crazy"	2019	Madonna	Madame X	Co-Writer/Producer	Starrah, Madonna	Mike Dean, Madonna
"I Rise"	2019	Madonna	Madame X	Co-Writer/Producer	Starrah, Madonna	Mike Dean, Madonna
"Jealous"	2019	Ingrid Michaelson	Stranger Songs	Co-Producer	Ingrid Michaelson, Will Lobban-Bean, Casey Smith	Lionel Crasta, Gian Stone
"Trust"	2019	Jonas Brothers	Happiness Begins	Co-Writer/Producer	Joe Jonas, N. Jonas, Ryan Tedder, Ammar Malik	Ryan Tedder
"Jersey"	2019	Jonas Brothers	Music from Chasing Happiness	Co-Writer/Producer	Joe Jonas, N. Jonas, K. Jonas, James Ghaleb	-
"Like It's Christmas"	2019	Jonas Brothers	Non-album single	Co-Writer, Co-Producer	Nick Jonas, Joe Jonas, Kevin Jonas, Gian Stone, Freddy Wexler, Annika Wells	Ryan Tedder, Mike Elizondo, Freddy Wexler, Gian Stone
"Drama"	2019	Boy Epic	Non-album single	Co-Writer, Producer	Boy Epic	-
"I Wish"	2019	Hayley Kioko	I'm Too Sensitive for This Shit	Co-Writer, Co-Producer	Pat Morrissey, Bibi Bourelly	Pat Morrissey
"Be Somebody"	2019	Brigetta	Non-album single	Co-Writer, Producer	Brigetta Truitt	-
"Can You Hear Me Now"	2019	Bishop Briggs	Champion	Co-Writer, Producer	Bishop Briggs, Scott Harris	-
"Top Of The World"	2019	Papa Roach	Who Do You Trust?	Co-Writer, Producer	Jerry Horton Jr, Tobin Esperance, Jacoby Shaddix	-
"The Digital"	2019	Elephant Heart	Seasons	Co-Writer	Victoria Evigan, Solomon Olds & Lauren Olds	-
"Lenguas"	2019	Elephant Heart	Seasons	Co-Writer	Victoria Evigan, Isaiah Tejada & Miles Beard	-
"Something's Got to Give"	2019	Labrinth	Imagination & the Misfit Kid	Co-Writer	Labrinth, Darren Poole & Ammar Malik	-
"Rather Be Alone"	2019	Robin Schulz	IIII	Co-Writer	Daniel Deimann, Dennis Bierbrodt, Guido Kramer, Isidoros Kiloudis, Jordan Johnson, Jürgen Dohr, Marcus Lomax, Nikolaos Martinos, Robin Schulz, Sam Martin, Sean Douglas, Stefan Dabruck, Stefan Johnson, Lennie King'ori, Jhawgez Von Rubixx, Spax Di Genius	-
"Lost in Translation"	2019	Johnnyswim	Moonlight	Co-Writer, Producer	Malay, Amanda Sudano, Abner Ramirez	Malay
"Right Here, Right Now"	2019	Bebe Rexha	Non-album single	Co-Writer, Producer	MarcLo, Saweetie, Jordan K. Johnson, Bebe Rexha, Lindy Robbins, Stefan Johnson	German, The Monsters and the Strangerz
"Obvious"	2019	Deorro	Non-album single	Co-Writer	John Ryan, Deorro, Ammar Malik	-
"People You Know"	2020	Selena Gomez	Rare	Co-writer	Selena Gomez, Alex Hope, Steph Jones, Mathieu Jomphe Lépine, Lil Aaron	-
"Physical"	2020	Dua Lipa	Future Nostalgia	Co-writer/Producer	Clarence Coffee Jr., Dua Lipa, Sarah Hudson	KOZ
"Boys Will Be Boys"	2020	Dua Lipa	Future Nostalgia	Co-writer	Justin Tranter, Dua Lipa, Kennedi Lykken	-
"I Still Do"	2020	Kiiara	Lil Kiiwi	Co-writer/Producer	Kiara Saulters, Ali Tamposi, Justin Tranter	-
"I Should Probably Go To Bed"	2020	Dan + Shay	Good Things	Co-writer	Sean Douglas, Dan Smyers, Shay Mooney	-
"Save Myself"	2020	Ashe	Ashlyn	Co-writer/Producer	Ashlyn Wilson, Michael Pollack, Casey Smith	Michael Pollack, Big Taste
"Guess I'm a Liar"	2020	Sofia Carson	Non-album single	Co-Writer/Producer	Simon Wilcox, Caroline Ailin, Sam Martin	Gian Stone
"Forever"	2020	Fletcher	Non-album single	Co-Writer/Producer	Amy Allen, Cari Fletcher, Tim Sommers, Jeremy Dussolliet, Gian Stone	Gian Stone, One Love, Lionel Krasta
"Loved By You" (featuring Burna Boy)	2021	Justin Bieber	Justice	Co-writer/Producer	Amy Allen, Jon Bellion, Justin Bieber, Sonny Moore, Damini Ebunoluwa Ogulu	Skrillex, LeriQ
"Angel Baby"	2021	Troye Sivan	Non-album single	Co-Writer/Producer	Troye Sivan, Michael Pollack, Sarah Hudson, James Abrahart	-
"Sweet Dream"	2021	Alessia Cara	In The Meantime	Co-Writer/Producer	Alessia Cara, Caroline Ailin, Jon Levine, Spencer Stewart	Jon Levine, Spencer Stewart
"Move Me"	2022	Charli XCX	Crash	Co-writer	Charli XCX Amy Allen, Ian Kirkpatrick	-
"Vicious"	2022	Sabrina Carpenter	Emails I Can't Send	Co-writer/Producer	Sabrina Carpenter, Amy Allen	-
"In The Stars"	2022	Benson Boone	Non-album single	Co-Writer/Producer	Michael Pollack, Benson Boone	-
"Bite Me"	2023	Enhypen	Dark Blood	Co-Writer/Producer	Cirkut, David Stewart, Lourdiz, Supreme Boi	Cirkut
"Call Me Revenge" (featuring d4vd)	2023	21 Savage	Non-album single	Co-Writer/Producer	Ryan Tedder, Sam Harris, Sean Foreman, 21 Savage	Ryan Tedder
"Caught in Your Love"	2024	Boys World	Non-album single	Co-Writer/Producer	Amy Allen, Jon Bellion	Smile High, Gino Barletta
"Too Bad For Us"	2024	Rosé	Rosie	Co-writer	Chae Young Park, Wayne Hector, Gian Stone, Freddy Wexler, Ben Fielding, Dean Ussher	-
"Born with a Broken Heart"	2025	Damiano David	Funny Little Fears	Co-writer/Producer	Damiano David, Sarah Hudson, Mark Schick	Mark Schick
"Next Summer"	2025	Damiano David	Funny Little Fears	Co-writer/Producer	Damiano David, Sarah Hudson, Mark Schick	Mark Schick
"Sorry I'm Here for Someone Else"	2025	Benson Boone	American Heart	Co-writer/Producer	Benson Boone, Jack LaFrontz	-
"Romeo"	2025	Dove Cameron	TBA	Co-writer/producer	Dove Cameron, Madison Love, Gracey, Lionel Crasta	Lionel Crasta

=== Singles ===
- 2013: Demi Lovato – "Heart Attack"
- 2013: Demi Lovato – "Made in the USA"
- 2013: Jason Derulo – "Talk Dirty"
- 2014: David Guetta – "Lovers On The Sun"
- 2015: Kelly Clarkson – "Heartbeat Song"
- 2015: Madonna – "Ghosttown"
- 2016: Robin Schulz (featuring David Guetta, Cheat Codes) – "Shed a Light"
- 2017: Papa Roach – "Born For Greatness"
- 2017: Boy Epic – "Kanye's In My Head"
- 2017: Maroon 5 (featuring SZA) – "What Lovers Do"
- 2017: Chromeo - "Juice"
- 2017: Sofia Carson - "Ins And Outs"
- 2017: Boy Epic - "Trust"
- 2017: Sage The Gemini - "Whatchacha"
- 2018: Maroon 5 (featuring Cardi B) – "Girls Like You"
- 2018: Rüfüs Du Sol - "No Place"
- 2018: Rüfüs Du Sol - "Underwater"
- 2018: Rüfüs Du Sol - "Lost in My Mind"
- 2018: Rüfüs Du Sol - "Treat You Better"
- 2018: Elephant Heart - "Hiya"
- 2018: Elephant Heart - "Warfare"
- 2019: Clean Bandit (featuring Ellie Goulding) - "Mama"
- 2019: Madonna - "I Rise"
- 2019: Madonna - "Crazy"
- 2019: Hobo Johnson - "Typical Story"
- 2019: Hobo Johnson - "Ugly Kid"
- 2019: Ellie Goulding (featuring Juice Wrld) - "Hate Me"
- 2019: Illenium (featuring Jon Bellion) - "Good Things Fall Apart"
- 2020: Dan + Shay - "I Should Probably Go to Bed"

== Filmography ==
Year	Title	Role	Notes
1998	Mel	Sammy	
2004	Something Sweet	The Artist	Short film
2006	Racin' for a Livin'	Himself (guest)	Segment: "Opening Preview"
2019	Songland	Himself	Episode: "OneRepublic"

== See also ==
- List of people from Los Angeles
