= Solace Remixed =

Remix album by Rüfüs Du Sol
- Released: 6 September 2019
- Length: 127:25
- Label: Rose Avenue

Rüfüs Du Sol chronology
Solace (2018)	Solace Remixed (2019)	Live from Joshua Tree (2020)

Solace Remixed is the first remix album by Australian alternative dance group, Rüfüs Du Sol. The collection features a sonically diverse reworking of the tracks from Rüfüs Du Sol's third studio album, Solace. Solace Remixed was released on 6 September 2019.

When asked what inspired the album, the band said "We've always loved people being able to put their own spin on our music in a new context. It felt like at this point we were able to get in touch with some of the artists we admire and it seemed like an opportunity not to be missed. It allowed some more dance-orientated artists to create special moments for dance floors around the world."

== Track listing ==
No.	Title	Length
1.	"Treat You Better" (Cassian remix)	4:50
2.	"Eyes" (Rüfüs Du Sol VIP Edit)	8:19
3.	"New Sky" (Audiofly remix)	10:57
4.	"Lost in My Mind" (Icarus remix)	5:35
5.	"No Place" (Eelke Kleijn remix)	7:56
6.	"All I've Got" (Mathame Remix)	7:30
7.	"Underwater" (Adam Port remix)	6:39
8.	"Solace" (Lastlings remix)	5:54
9.	"Another Life" (Hot Since 82 remix)	5:54
Total length:		63:34

No.	Title	Length
1.	"Treat You Better" (Gerd Janson Acid Vocoder remix)	5:35
2.	"Eyes" (Durante & Cassian remix)	5:43
3.	"New Sky" (Edu Imbernon remix)	8:55
4.	"Lost in My Mind" (Justin Martin remix)	7:33
5.	"No Place" (Will Clarke remix)	5:58
6.	"All I've Got" (Gorje Hewek & Izhevski remix)	6:10
7.	"Underwater" (Willaris K. remix)	9:06
8.	"Solace" (TERR remix)	6:41
9.	"Another Life" (Made in Paris)	8:10
Total length:		63:51

== Charts ==
=== Weekly charts ===
Chart (2019)	Peak position
Australian Albums (ARIA)	69

=== Year-end charts ===
Chart (2019)	Position
Australian Dance Albums (ARIA)	39
Chart (2020)	Position
Australian Dance Albums (ARIA)	8
Chart (2021)	Position
Australian Dance Albums (ARIA)	10
Chart (2022)	Position
Australian Dance Albums (ARIA)	13
Chart (2023)	Position
Australian Dance Albums (ARIA)	12
Chart (2024)	Position
Australian Dance Albums (ARIA)	22
Chart (2025)	Position
Australian Dance Albums (ARIA)	27

== Release history ==
Region	Date	Format(s)	Label	Catalogue
Various	6 September 2019	Digital download; streaming	Rose Avenue	093624898573
Australia	25 October 2019	2×CD; 2×LP	Sony	19075986432
