= Live from Joshua Tree =

Live album by Rüfüs Du Sol
- Released: 6 March 2020
- Recorded: September 2019
- Studio: Skyline Ranch, Joshua Tree, California, USA
- Label: Rose Avenue

Rüfüs Du Sol chronology
Solace Remixed (2019)	Live from Joshua Tree (2020)	Surrender (2020)

Live from Joshua Tree is the first live album and concert film by Australian alternative dance group, Rüfüs Du Sol. The album was announced in February 2020 and released digitally on 6 March 2020.

The album was filmed in September 2019 in the Joshua Tree National Park in the United States. Upon announcement, James Hunt said "We originally planned for it to be a live stream, but as the idea grew and the production got bigger and bigger, it organically morphed into a film". Following its vinyl release in July 2023, the album peaked at number 14 on the ARIA Charts.

The film, of the same name, was produced by Danny Robson & Alexander George and was also released on 6 March 2020. The release followed two exclusive Australian screenings of the film at Ritz Cinemas Randwick in Sydney and IMAX in Melbourne on 4 March 2020 with all proceeds raised going to The Red Cross to be put towards Australian bushfire aid.

== Reception ==
In a review of the film, Robyn Dexter from Dancing Astronaut called it "breathtaking" saying "The film takes the viewer through some of the band's most recognisable tunes, presented in an immersive and awe-inspiring format. From 'Eyes' to 'Innerbloom' to the previously released footage of 'Solace', fans are sure to delight in the breathtaking composition of these beloved songs."

Music journalist Bernard Zuel said "I've never seen them presented in such a stunning, tell-your-kids-about-that-one-day way either. And it sounds good to boot, with the set list weighted slightly more towards atmosphere than sweat to emphasise the widescreen nature of Rüfüs Du Sol."

== Track listing ==
No.	Title	Length
1.	"Valley of the Yuccas"	3:47
2.	"Eyes"	4:24
3.	"New Sky"	5:28
4.	"Desert Night"	5:35
5.	"Solace"	4:52
6.	"Underwater"	4:50
7.	"Innerbloom"	7:57
8.	"No Place"	5:49

== Charts ==
Weekly chart performance for Live from Joshua Tree
Chart (2023)	Peak position
Australian Albums (ARIA)	14

=== Year-end charts ===
Chart (2023)	Position
Australian Dance Albums (ARIA)	42

== Release history ==
Region	Date	Format(s)	Label	Catalogue
Various	6 March 2020	Digital download; streaming	Rose Avenue	—N/a
Australia	7 July 2023	LP	Rose Avenue	093624870616
