= Treat You Better =

Treat You Better may refer to:

- "Treat You Better" (Shawn Mendes song), 2016
- "Treat You Better" (Rüfüs Du Sol song), 2018
