= Yotto =

Finnish DJ, songwriter and record producer (born 1986)

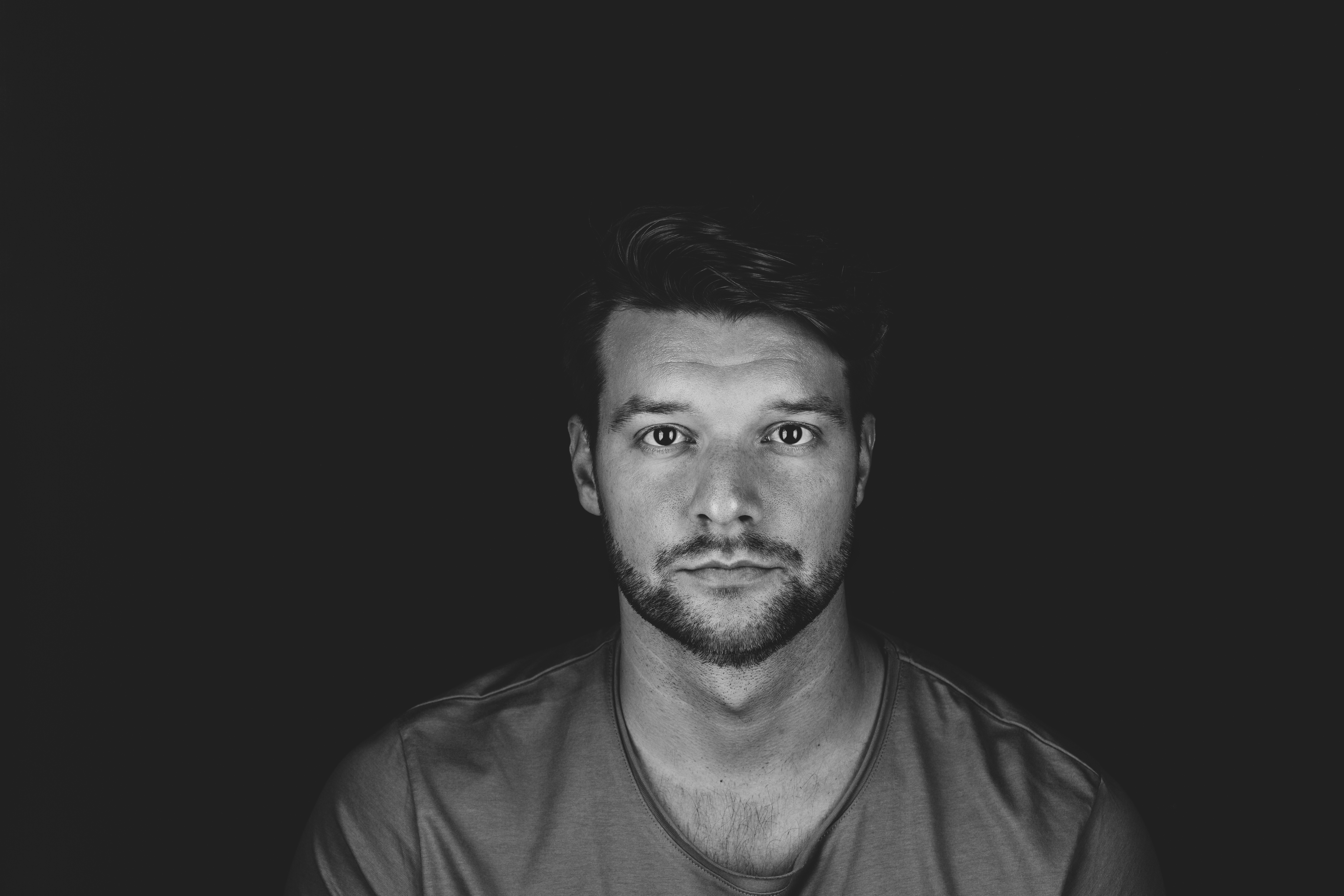

Background information
- Born: Otto Yliperttula; October 8, 1986 (age 40)
- Origin: Helsinki, Finland
- Genres: Deep house, house, techno
- Occupations: Disc jockey, record producer
- Years active: 2014–present
- Labels: Anjunadeep, Green, Odd One Out
- Formerly of: Something Good
- Website: Official website

Otto Yliperttula (born October 8, 1986), known professionally by his stage name, Yotto, is a Finnish DJ, songwriter, and record producer. Currently residing in Helsinki, Finland, Yotto releases music under English deep house label Anjunadeep in addition to his own label Odd One Out.

Yotto came to limelight with a string of remixes and originals that caught the ear of Anjunadeep label boss James Grant. Deemed "a man of many sounds" by Billboard and "an experimental house talent" by Dancing Astronaut, he produces a number of styles within the house music genre and sometimes other forms of electronic music.

As well as his own solo releases and releases on Joris Voorn's Green Recordings, Yliperttula has worked alongside DJs and producers such as Above & Beyond, Coldplay, M83, London Grammar, Rüfüs, Lane 8, and Super8 & Tab. Yotto has also collaborated with his younger brother who performed vocals on tracks like "Wondering" under the alias Caps.

Yotto released his debut album Hyperfall through Anjunadeep in 2018.

== Musical influences ==
The son of musically inclined parents and the sibling of a vocalist, Yliperttula grew up in a musical family. He started taking classical piano lessons as a young child and played regularly until the age of 14. As a teenager, skateboard culture influenced a wide range of personal preferences for West Coast hip hop music, and heavy metal bands such as Iron Maiden and Manic Street Preachers. This eclectic taste in music that enabled Yliperttula to stay open-minded and not get deeply vested into any one genre, instead just listening to music he enjoyed.

== Career ==
When starting up his career within electronic music, Otto was initially a part of a Helsinki-based melodic deep house duo called "Something Good," together with Karolus Viitala. As a solo act, Otto, or Yotto, officially joined the Anjunadeep roster with his debut release "Memento" / "Azzurro" in 2015. His debut release on the label included a two track EP. "Memento" has been described as an atmospheric opener to the EP with bass-driven precision. Premiered on BBC Radio 1, "Azzurro" was described as a "slap shot to the face" by BBC radio host, Pete Tong, and a bustling track with a chilling piano line and a dramatic crescendo by Dancing Astronaut.

Yliperttula followed up his debut release with a second EP, titled Wondering in August 2015. The EP includes three tracks; "Wondering," "Slowly," and "Coming Back to You." In an interview with Urb magazine, Yotto explained, "The EP was built from these tracks, as they all seem to share a stress-free vibe." The title track, "Wondering," is a collaboration with his younger brother which they produced in a tiny studio at their house in Finland.

"Personal Space / Mulholland 99" is the title of the two-track EP Yliperttula released in December 2015. The release was his third Anjunadeep release, and his fourth on the year. Pete Tong selected "Personal Space" as Essential New Tune on his BBC Radio 1 show on November 20, 2015.

In early 2016, Yotto was named an "Artist to Watch" in 2016 by the electronic music blog LessThan3. On January 15, 2016, Yliperttula released an official remix of "Like an Animal" by Rüfüs on Sweat It Out Records. The track was premiered by Hunger TV and garnered his second Essential New Tune accolade by BBC Radio 1 DJ Pete Tong on his weekly radio show. It has been described as adding tension to the original through a minimalist approach.

Halfway through his U.S. tour in 2015, Yliperttula received a request to remix Coldplay's feature track, "Adventure of a Lifetime," from their 2016 album A Head Full of Dreams. The remix premiered twice; first by radio on Above & Beyond's Group Therapy Radio show and then exclusively to the public by Billboard magazine online. Critics have said his rendition of the track "has proven [Yotto] knows pop music just as well as the environmental and underground [music]."

April saw the release of Yotto's first original productions of 2016, with "Aviate" and "Crosswalk" released as a two track EP on Anjunadeep. "Aviate" earned yet another Essential New Tune selection for Yotto, marking his third in less than six months. Then in June, Yotto released arguably his most successful track to date, "The Owls." Picking up his fourth Essential New Tune selection on Pete Tong's BBC Radio 1 show and also named "Hottest Record in the World" by Annie Mac, "The Owls" was premiered by Mixmag who called it "another staple addition to Yotto's defined, formidable sound."

In November 2016, Yotto released "Fire Walk," a track he had debuted at Above & Beyond's ABGT 200 show in Amsterdam. "Fire Walk" gained the support of Pete Tong, Annie Mac, and Danny Howard who called the track "A stonewall banger." Soon after the track premiered on BBC, it climbed the Beatport charts to become No. 1, and the track was supported by Paul Oakenfold, Cosmic Gate, Steve Angello, and Markus Schulz.

Yotto continued his heavy touring schedule in 2017 with performances at ABGT250, Electric Zoo, Spring Awakening, Coachella, and Hï Ibiza supporting Eric Prydz.

Yotto's track "Song from the Sun" was also featured in the Netflix original movie XOXO.

His first BBC Radio 1 Essential Mix debuted on January 27, 2018. His debut album Hyperfall was released later that year through Anjunadeep on September 7, 2018.

== Discography ==
=== Studio albums ===
- Hyperfall (2018)
- Growth (2023)

=== Extended plays ===
- All I Want / Cycle (So Sure Music / October 6, 2014)
- Wondering (Anjunadeep / August 15, 2015)
- North (Anjunadeep / October 6, 2017)
- Radiate (Anjunadeep / June 1, 2018)
- Another Riff for the Good Times / Daydreaming (Anjunadeep / July 7, 2020)
- Songs You Might Remember from Some Parties (Odd One Out / July 1, 2021)

=== Singles ===
- "Seven Mountains" (Change Audio / September 8, 2014)
- "Azzurro" / "Memento" (Anjunadeep / May 25, 2015)
- "Anything About You" (with You Are Me feat. CAPS) (So Sure Music / July 6, 2015)
- "Personal Space" / "Mulholland 99" (Anjunadeep / December 11, 2015)
- "Aviate" / "Crosswalk" (Anjunadeep / April 8, 2016)
- "The Owls" (Anjunadeep / July 1, 2016)
- "Cooper's Cup" (Anjunadeep / August 26, 2016)
- "Fire Walk" (Anjunadeep / November 11, 2016)
- "Marisa" (Green / April 7, 2017)
- "Wilderness Girl" (Anjunadeep / May 26, 2017)
- "Chemicals" / "Second Life" (Green / March 2, 2018)
- "The One You Left Behind" (feat. Vök) (Anjunadeep / July 16, 2018)
- "Hear Me Out" (feat. Sønin and Laudic) (Anjunadeep / August 14, 2018)
- "Walls" (Anjunadeep / August 28, 2018)
- "Turn It Around" (Anjunadeep / April 12, 2019)
- "I / Y" (with Lane 8) (This Never Happened / June 20, 2019)
- "Shifter" (Odd One Out / July 23, 2019)
- "Nova" (Odd One Out / August 20, 2019)
- "Is This Trance?" (Odd One Out / September 27, 2019)
- "Hyperlude (Dosem Edit)" (Anjunadeep / December 6, 2019)
- "Amaru" (Odd One Out / March 3, 2020)
- "Tarantia" (Odd One Out / June 11, 2020)
- "Another Riff for the Good Times / Daydreaming" (Anjunadeep / July 7, 2020)
- "Buggy" (with Lane 8) (Odd One Out / August 13, 2020)
- "Maggio" (Anjunadeep / September 21, 2020)
- "Inter / Grains" (with Cassian) (Odd One Out / November 19, 2020)
- "Observer" (Siamese / December 4, 2020)
- "I Want You" (feat. Braev) (Odd One Out / February 22, 2021)
- "New Era / Only One" (with Stephan Jolk) (Afterlife / March 19, 2021)
- "Out of Reach" (with Cristoph featuring Sansa) (Pryda Presents / May 28, 2021)

=== Remixes ===
- Jojo Da Silva and Sergio Rincon – "Chi Co Monte" (Yotto Remix) (August 28, 2009)
- M83 – "Intro" (Yotto Rework) (July 22, 2012)
- London Grammar – "Strong" (Yotto Rework) (September 16, 2014)
- Pierce Fulton – "Kuaga" (Yotto Remix) (Cr2 Records / November 24, 2014)
- Roisto – "Apart in Love" (Yotto Remix) (Youth Control / January 27, 2015)
- 7 Skies and Super8 & Tab – "Rubicon" (Yotto Remix) (Anjunabeats / February 16, 2015)
- Above & Beyond feat. Gemma Hayes – "Counting Down the Days" (Yotto Remix) (Anjunabeats / July 31, 2015)
- Lane 8 feat. Matthew Dear – "Undercover" (Yotto Remix) (Anjunadeep / October 23, 2015)
- Rüfüs – "Like an Animal" (Yotto Remix) (Sweat It Out! / January 19, 2016)
- Coldplay – "Adventure of a Lifetime" (Yotto Remix) (Ministry of Sound / May 27, 2016)
- Röyksopp – "Never Ever" (Yotto Remix) (March 3, 2017)
- Lane 8 & Kidnap Kid – "Aba" (Yotto Remix) (Anjunadeep / June 30, 2017)
- Gorillaz – "Busted and Blue" (Yotto Remix) (Parlophone / Sept 1, 2017)
- Christian Loffler – "Lid" (Yotto Remix) (Ki Records / Sept 8, 2017)
- B.B.E. – "Seven Days and One Week" (Yotto Remix) (Positiva / Sept 24, 2018)
- Luke Brancaccio & Simon Berry – "I Hear This" (Yotto Remix) (Bedrock Records / December 3, 2018)
- Sasha – "Smokemonk" (Yotto Remix) (Last Night on Earth / February 15, 2019)
- Rüfüs Du Sol – "Underwater" (Yotto's Dawn Remix) (Rose Avenue/Reprise / May 31, 2019)
- Diplo feat. Tove Lo – "Win Win" (Yotto Remix) (Mad Decent / June 26, 2019)
- Joris Voorn – "Antigone" (Yotto Remix) (Spectrum (NL) / February 14, 2020)
- Jos & Eli – "Atomica" (Yotto Remix / March 16, 2020)
- Cassian feat. Tora – "Imagination" (Yotto Remix) (Rose Avenue / July 24, 2020)
- AVIRA – "Love Me" (Yotto Remix) (Odd One Out / October 8, 2020)
- Faithless feat. Nathan Ball & Caleb Femi – "I Need Someone" (Yotto Remix) (BMG Rights Management (UK) Ltd / March 12, 2021)
- Power Circle – "Garden of Peace" (Yotto Renaissance Remix) (Renaissance Records / April 16, 2021)
- Orbital - "Belfast" (Yotto Remix) (Orbital Recordings / July 29, 2022)
- Alison Goldfrapp - "So Hard So Hot" (Yotto Remix) (BMG / July 7, 2023)
