= Solace (Rüfüs Du Sol album) =

Studio album by Rüfüs Du Sol
- Released: 19 October 2018
- Genre: Alternative dance, deep house
- Length: 41:59
- Label: Rose Avenue; Sony Music Australia
- Producer: Rüfüs Du Sol; Jason Evigan

Rüfüs Du Sol chronology
Bloom (2016)	Solace (2018)	Solace Remixed (2019)

Singles from Solace
- 1. "No Place" Released: 25 May 2018; 2. "Underwater" Released: 10 August 2018; 3. "Lost in My Mind" Released: 5 September 2018; 4. "Treat You Better" Released: 9 November 2018

Solace is the third studio album by Australian alternative dance group, Rüfüs Du Sol, released on 19 October 2018. The album was supported by a tour that commenced in North America on 24 October and ended in Europe on 8 December 2018. Australian tour dates were added in October, taking place from 1 January until 2 March 2019.

At the J Awards of 2018, the album was nominated for Australian Album of the Year.

At the ARIA Music Awards of 2019, the album was nominated for three awards; Album of the Year, Best Dance Release and Best Group. It won the ARIA Award for Best Dance Release.

In November 2019, the album was nominated for Grammy Award for Best Dance/Electronic Album at the 2020 Awards.

== Singles ==
The album was preceded by "No Place" as the lead single on 25 May 2018. The song peaked at number 41 on the ARIA Singles Chart. "Underwater" was released on 10 August 2018 and peaked at number 79 on the ARIA Singles Chart. "Lost in My Mind" was released on 5 September 2018 accompanying the pre-order for the album. A single edit of "Treat You Better" was released on 9 November 2018 as the album's fourth single.

== Critical reception ==
Professional ratings
Review scores
Source	Rating
The Age	4.5/5 stars
Auspop	4/5 stars
Herald Sun	4/5 stars

Cameron Adams from the Herald Sun said "With the electronic dance music scene turning formulaic and predictable, [Rüfüs Du Sol] have gone deeper and darker. Solace is as inspired by the ambient electro soundscapes of Jon Hopkins and Brian Eno as much as digital pioneers like Giorgio Moroder." David from auspOp said "The thing I love about good electronic music is when the album is curated in a way that it can be listened to like a soundtrack; Solace is one of those albums." Adams added that "At only nine songs long, it's a short album that leaves you longing for more. But it's also impressive to hear brilliant local talent producing world-class electronic and dance music that still attracts mainstream attention." Kish Lal from The Age called Solace "a triumphant record", writing that "Electronic music is often thought of as harsh and unlistenable, but Solace is delicate and incredibly sophisticated in its production. The lyrics hinge on one central theme of yearning, whether that be for change, company or space."

Alesha Kolbe from Stack Magazine wrote that "Rüfüs Du Sol are keeping it short and sweet with their third studio album with just nine new tracks. Opener "Treat You Better" will remind you why you fell in love with Rüfüs Du Sol in the first place, with their synthy dance-pop reverberating all around the track's rhythms and welcoming you home with a warm embrace. "Eyes" leans far more heavily into dance vibes, and title track "Solace" slows things down, reminiscent of classics like "Sundream" and "Like an Animal"." Kolbe concluded that the "[s]ix-minute closer "Another Life" might as well just soundtrack all your near-future daylight savings Sunday sessions. Solace is just enough to get you through to summer."

Kat Benin from Billboard felt that "The whole album feels emergent, like a new plant breaking through the soil to reach the light. It's quite personal, really, but in a relative fashion Rüfüs hopes touches you in meaningful ways." Al Newstead from ABC opined that "Solace kicks off a new chapter for the band, representing a bittersweet balance between the inspiration they soaked up from the sun-kissed beaches of Los Angeles and the stark desert landscapes of Joshua Tree National Park. They've furthered their vibrant production by exploring a darker side of their sound with more emphasis on emotive storytelling and vocal performances."

== Track listing ==
No.	Title	Length
1.	"Treat You Better"	4:33
2.	"Eyes"	3:50
3.	"New Sky"	5:27
4.	"Lost in My Mind"	4:22
5.	"No Place"	3:58
6.	"All I've Got"	3:43
7.	"Underwater"	5:49
8.	"Solace"	3:37
9.	"Another Life"	6:40
Total length:		41:59

== Charts ==
=== Weekly charts ===
Weekly chart performance for Solace
Chart (2018)	Peak position
Australian Albums (ARIA)	2
New Zealand Albums (RMNZ)	32
US Top Dance Albums (Billboard)	6

=== Year-end charts ===
Year-end chart performance for Solace
Chart (2018)	Position
Australian Dance Albums (ARIA)	10
Chart (2019)	Position
Australian Albums (ARIA)	68
Australian Dance Albums (ARIA)	1
Chart (2020)	Position
Australian Dance Albums (ARIA)	6
Chart (2021)	Position
Australian Dance Albums (ARIA)	4
Chart (2022)	Position
Australian Dance Albums (ARIA)	11
Chart (2023)	Position
Australian Dance Albums (ARIA)	4
Chart (2024)	Position
Australian Dance Albums (ARIA)	9
Chart (2025)	Position
Australian Dance Albums (ARIA)	13

== Certifications ==
Certifications for Solace
Region	Certification	Certified units/sales
Australia (ARIA)	Gold	35,000^{‡}
New Zealand (RMNZ)	Gold	7,500^{‡}
^{‡} Sales+streaming figures based on certification alone.

== Release history ==
Release history for Solace
Region	Date	Format(s)	Label	Catalogue
Australia	19 October 2018	CD; digital download; streaming	Rose Avenue/Sony Music Australia	19075899412
Australia	14 December 2018	Vinyl	Sony Music Australia	1574498
