= Inhale / Exhale (Rüfüs Du Sol album) =

Studio album by Rüfüs Du Sol
- Released: 11 October 2024
- Length: 58:56
- Labels: Rose Avenue; Reprise
- Producer: Rüfüs Du Sol

Rüfüs Du Sol chronology
Surrender (Remixes) (2022)	Inhale / Exhale (2024)

Singles from Inhale / Exhale
- 1. "Music Is Better" Released: 21 June 2024; 2. "Lately" Released: 2 August 2024; 3. "Break My Love" Released: 11 September 2024; 4. "Pressure" Released: 27 September 2024

Inhale / Exhale is the fifth studio album by Australian alternative dance group Rüfüs Du Sol. It was released on 11 October 2024 through Rose Avenue and Reprise Records.

At the 2024 J Awards, the album was nominated for Australian Album of the Year.

The album was shortlisted for Best LP/EP at the 2025 Rolling Stone Australia Awards.

At the 2025 ARIA Music Awards, the album was nominated for Album of the Year, Best Group and Best Produced Release.

At the 2026 Grammy Awards, the album was nominated for Best Dance/Electronic Album.

== Background and singles ==
Announced a month ahead of the release, on 11 September 2024, the record is said to encompass "themes that have endeared fans for over a decade", namely "romance, heartbreak, euphoria, despair", which are supposed to be delivered through "sprawling, mature soundscapes" combined with their signature electronic sounds. Inhale / Exhale marks a new chapter for the trio as they have come to "just enjoy" the process and "creating in the moment". On 21 June, the album was led by the track "Music Is Better" which "offers a window into a new creative groove for the band" and marked their first single in three years. The second single "Lately", released on 2 August, sees the combination of "heartfelt lyrics, indie vibes and a club bounce". The third single "Break My Love" was released alongside the album announcement and constitutes a testament to the "evolved sound and deep musicality" showcased by the band. "Pressure" was released on 27 September 2024.

== Track listing ==
All tracks are written by Rüfüs Du Sol; "Music Is Better" written with Benjamin Latimore.

Inhale / Exhale track listing
No.	Title	Length
1.	"Inhale"	1:48
2.	"Lately"	4:09
3.	"Breathe"	3:01
4.	"Music Is Better"	3:56
5.	"Levitating"	4:03
6.	"Break My Love"	4:20
7.	"In the Moment"	4:38
8.	"New York"	3:09
9.	"The Life"	4:27
10.	"Pressure"	4:39
11.	"Fire / Desire"	4:17
12.	"Edge of the Earth"	4:31
13.	"Standing at the Gates"	3:09
14.	"Belong"	5:04
15.	"Exhale"	3:45
Total length:		58:56

== Personnel ==
Rüfüs Du Sol

- Tyrone Lindqvist – vocals, instrumentation, programming, production, vocal production, vocal engineering
- Jon George – vocals, instrumentation, programming, production, vocal production, vocal engineering
- James Hunt – vocals, instrumentation, programming, production, vocal production, vocal engineering

Additional musicians

- Cayla Griffin – choir vocals (tracks 1, 4, 5, 7, 8, 10)
- Chandelor Johnson – choir vocals (tracks 1, 4, 5, 7, 8, 10)
- DeAnte Duckelt – choir vocals (tracks 1, 4, 5, 7, 8, 10)
- Jazzmine DuBose – choir vocals (tracks 1, 4, 5, 7, 8, 10)
- Kadmiel Siler – choir vocals (tracks 1, 4, 5, 7, 8, 10)
- Kisha Tinson – choir vocals (tracks 1, 4, 5, 7, 8, 10)
- Marianne Haynes – viola, violin (track 4)
- Hal Ritson – violin (track 4)

Technical

- Dale Becker – mastering
- Cassian Stewart-Kasimba – mixing
- Hal Ritson – strings production, strings programming (track 4)
- Richard Adlam – strings production, strings programming (track 4)
- Pedro Laet – vocal engineering (tracks 5, 7, 8, 10)
- Lionel Crasta – additional engineering (track 11)

== Charts ==
=== Weekly charts ===
Weekly chart performance for Inhale / Exhale
Chart (2024)	Peak position
Australian Albums (ARIA)	3
New Zealand Albums (RMNZ)	23
Portuguese Albums (AFP)	155
Swiss Albums (Schweizer Hitparade)	18
UK Album Downloads (Official Charts)	72
UK Dance Albums (Official Charts)	5
US Billboard 200	179
US Top Dance Albums (Billboard)	3

=== Year-end charts ===
Year-end chart performance for Inhale / Exhale
Chart (2024)	Position
Australian Artist Albums (ARIA)	20
Australian Dance Albums (ARIA)	12

Chart (2025)	Position
Australian Artist Albums (ARIA)	11
Australian Dance Albums (ARIA)	7
