= Blue (Rüfüs EP) =

EP by Rüfüs
- Released: 6 April 2012
- Recorded: Studios 301
- Genre: Electronic
- Length: 20:10
- Label: Gigpiglet Recordings
- Producer: Rüfüs

Rüfüs chronology
Rüfüs (2011)	Blue (2012)	Atlas (2013)

Singles from Blue
- 1. ""This Summer"/"Selena"" Released: 16 July 2012

Blue is the second extended play (EP) by Australian alternative dance group Rüfüs. The EP was released independently on 6 April 2012.

Band member Tyrone Lindqvist said: "We sought to channel a kind of dark euphoria; moving from sun drenched Sunday afternoons, to sunsets and half forgotten nights." Band member Jon George said: "You'll hear a lot of experimentation with recording and mixing techniques; some more hi-tech than others... We recorded in the studio kitchen for echoed vocals and drums, used a 5 cent coin as a guitar pick for a more metallic sound, squeezed the hi-hats for the tightest sounding hats possible, its been super hands on."

The EP was supported by "This Summer Tour" across April and May 2012 and "Blue Tour" across August 2012.

The lead single "This Summer" received high rotation on Triple J. "Talk to Me" features on the Kitsuné Summer mix compilation.

== Critical reception ==
Professional ratings
Review scores
Source	Rating
The AU Review	7.4/10

Jeremy Stevens from The AU Review said: "Ultimately, Blue builds over time. It represents a band that pay attention to detail. A band that diligently craft layer upon layer of spacey, beautiful, atmospheric pop to create something great. The timing is spot on, and RÜFÜS clearly have a strong grasp of what they're putting together. But at the end of the journey, as well-structured as the smooth, electronic songs are - some of it fails to really reach out and grab at you." Stevens also summarised: "This is a stunning collection of songs, all of them potential singles - but I can't help but feel that on the whole, something is missing."

Thomas Bailey from Beat Magazine said "The six tunes that make up Blue are smooth, glistening and assured pop gems that demand repeat listens. Tyron Lindqvist's vocals are a wonder to behold, as are Jon George's lush synth-scapes and James Hunt's rhythmic drums." He added, "All said, Rüfüs's second foray into the world of quality synth-pop is a pleasure to listen to; it's really a quite accomplished work."

== Track listing ==
No.	Title	Length
1.	"This Summer"	3:54
2.	"The Gun"	4:10
3.	"Droplets"	4:28
4.	"Selena"	3:05
5.	"Talk to Me"	3:16
6.	"This Summer" (outro)	1:34

== Release history ==
Region	Date	Format(s)	Label	Catalogue
Australia	6 April 2012	Digital download, CD	Gigpiglet Recordings	GP0011
United States	29 May 2012	Digital download	Inertia	B007TSXYFY
