= Music Is Better =

Single by Rüfüs Du Sol

from the album Inhale / Exhale
- Released: 21 June 2024
- Length: 3:56
- Label: Rose Avenue; Reprise
- Songwriters: Jon George; Tyrone Lindqvist; James Hunt; Benjamin Latimore
- Producers: Jon George; Tyrone Lindqvist; James Hunt

Rüfüs Du Sol singles chronology
"Something in the Way"" (2023)	"Music Is Better" (2024)	"Lately" (2024)

"Music Is Better" is a song by Australian alternative dance group Rüfüs Du Sol, released on 21 June 2024 as the lead single from their fifth studio album, Inhale / Exhale. As per a press release, the single "offers a window into a new creative groove for the band."

At the 2024 ARIA Music Awards, the song was nominated for Best Dance/Electronic Release and for the group, Best Group.

== Reception ==
Conor Lochrie from Rolling Stone Australia said "Exploring universal themes including hope, intimacy and connection – pillars of the Rüfüs Du Sol catalogue – 'Music Is Better' is tailor-made for hedonistic festival singalongs."

Mark Mancino from DJ Life Mag said "With 'Music is Better', Rüfüs Du Sol continues to push the boundaries of their sound, showcasing their signature captivating and emotionally resonant sound."

== Track listings ==
Digital single
No.	Title	Length
1.	"Music Is Better"	3:56

Digital single (Remixes)
No.	Title	Length
1.	"Music Is Better" (Maxi Meraki remix)	6:55
2.	"Music Is Better" (Club edit)	5:31
3.	"Music Is Better"	3:56

== Charts ==
Weekly chart performance for "Music Is Better"
Chart (2024)	Peak position
Australia Artist Singles (ARIA)	17
New Zealand Hot Singles (RMNZ)	18
US Hot Dance/Electronic Songs (Billboard)	35

== Certifications ==
Certifications for "Music Is Better"
Region	Certification	Certified units/sales
Australia (ARIA)	Gold	35,000^{‡}
^{‡} Sales+streaming figures based on certification alone.

== See also ==
- List of Billboard number-one dance songs of 2024
