= Ghosttown (Madonna song) =

Single by Madonna

from the album Rebel Heart
- Released: March 13, 2015
- Recorded: 2014
- Genre: Pop; electropop; electro
- Length: 4:09
- Label: Interscope
- Songwriters: Madonna Ciccone; Jason Evigan; Sean Douglas; Evan Bogart
- Producers: Madonna; Billboard; Jason Evigan

Madonna singles chronology
"Living for Love" (2014)	"Ghosttown" (2015)	"Bitch I'm Madonna" (2015)

Music video
- "Ghosttown" on YouTube

"Ghosttown" is a song recorded by American singer Madonna for her thirteenth studio album, Rebel Heart (2015). It was released to radio stations on March 13, 2015, as the album's second single. It was written by Madonna, Jason Evigan, Evan Bogart, and Sean Douglas, and produced by Madonna, Billboard and Evigan. Having listened to Douglas' previous works, Madonna requested studio time with him. Together with the other songwriters, they wrote "Ghosttown" in three days. The song was inspired by the imagery of a destroyed city after armageddon, and how the survivors carry on with their lives with love being the only thing they can hold onto. Musically, "Ghosttown" is an uplifting pop, electropop and electro ballad, featuring an organ and drums in its instrumentation.

"Ghosttown" was released to iTunes Store as part of the album's pre-order in December 2014, in response to hackers leaking songs from Rebel Heart. The song received positive response from music critics, who commended Madonna's vocal delivery, the lyrics, and the production; they also compared it to Madonna's earlier ballads. In the United States, the song became her 36th entry on the Adult Contemporary chart, as well as her 45th song to top the Hot Dance Club Songs chart, surpassing country singer George Strait as the artist with the most number ones on a single Billboard chart. Internationally, "Ghosttown" reached the top 20 in Hungary and Italy, and the digital charts of Finland and Sweden, and was certified platinum by the Federazione Industria Musicale Italiana (FIMI).

An accompanying music video for "Ghosttown" was directed by Jonas Åkerlund, and starred actor Terrence Howard. The main theme behind the video was "an apocalyptic situation mimicking the end of the world", showing the singer and Howard as sole survivors in a destroyed city. Madonna performed the song during her promotional schedules across Europe—Le Grand Journal in France, Che tempo che fa in Italy and The Jonathan Ross Show in the United Kingdom. She also performed it at the 2nd iHeartRadio Music Awards, where she was joined by Taylor Swift on guitar, and on some dates of her 2015–2016 Rebel Heart Tour.

== Background and release ==
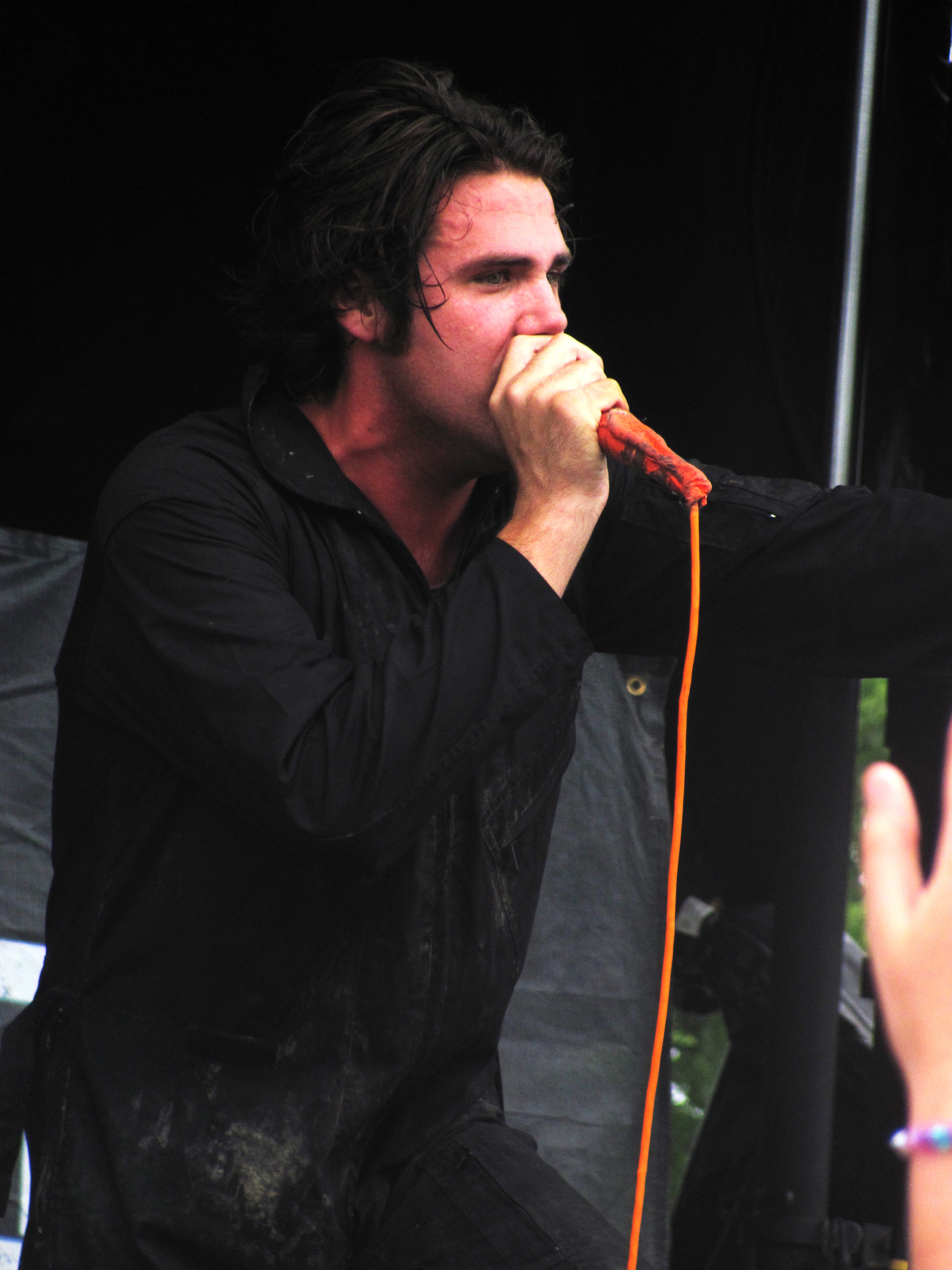
Jason Evigan co-wrote and co-produced "Ghosttown".

"Ghosttown" was written by Madonna, Jason Evigan, Evan Bogart, and Sean Douglas. The song was composed in three days, after Madonna personally requested some studio time with them. Madonna liked Jason Derulo's 2013 single "Talk Dirty" which was co-written by Evigan and Douglas, and hence she decided to collaborate with them. Douglas recalled that they ended up having a "great session", saying "I was incredibly nervous for obvious reasons, but she showed up, was super personable and was ready to work. I basically checked it off my life bucket list." Of their writing session, Madonna explained:

We all get into a room together. They start playing their chords and then we just start thinking about... When I write with people, we always try to come up with a theme. What do we want to write about? So this one is about the city after armageddon. The burnt out city, the crumbling buildings, the smoke that's still lingering after the fire. You know what I mean? There's only a few people left. How do we pick up the pieces and go on from here? Kind of dramatic. But not entirely impossible at this stage of the game... And we'll all be in our version of a 'Ghosttown' or in a version of a 'Ghosttown', and at the end of the day, all we're going to have left is each other. So that's really what that song is about.

While discussing the song's theme with French radio Europe 1, Madonna spoke about the intolerance going around the world, especially in France whom she believed to have lost its ability to accept people of all race and color. Adding that the level of intolerance and antisemitism was increasing all-throughout Europe, Madonna said that "Ghosttown"'s apocalyptic theme was a foreshadow of the destruction of humanity, should the intolerance continue. "The way we behave, to treat one another the way we're treating one another, to maintain this level of intolerance and discriminatory prejudice... hateful behavior towards other human beings who are different than you are," Madonna concluded.

On December 17, 2014, a total of 13 songs from the recording sessions were leaked. An aggravated Madonna took to Instagram and clarified that the songs were demo versions from earlier recordings. Madonna told Billboard that after the leak, she and her team tried to trace it back to the source. Ultimately they decided to release the finished songs. On December 20, 2014, the album became available for pre-order on iTunes Store. When ordered, six tracks were automatically downloaded, including "Ghosttown". Madonna added that she "would prefer [her] fans to hear completed versions of some of the songs instead of the incomplete tracks that are circulating." During Madonna's appearance on Italian television show Che tempo che fa, "Ghosttown" was confirmed as the second single from Rebel Heart and was sent to Italian radio on March 13, 2015. A week later it was added to Australian radio, while in the United Kingdom, it would be released on April 20, 2015.

== Composition and remixes ==
"Ghosttown"
A 24-second sample of "Ghosttown" featuring the chorus with lyrics "When it all falls down, when it all falls down. We'll be two souls in a 'Ghosttown'."

Thematically, introspection was also listed as one of the foundational themes prevalent in Rebel Heart, with genuine statements of careerist and personal reflections of Madonna and her "obsessive self-regard". "Ghosttown" was one of the songs carrying on the subtle messages while talking about unity and religious consciousness. Madonna reverses the concept of "loss of love" with her romantic idealization, according to Matthew Harden from Samesame.com.au, as the lyrics go "When it all falls down, when it all falls down. We'll be two souls in a 'Ghosttown'." Jim Farber from New York Daily News said that the song brings out "the warmest elements of [Madonna's] voice" and "at times, her alto [range] sounds like Karen Carpenter's, while the melody has the enveloping calm of hits like 'Live to Tell'".

The song's composition is "uplifting" and "euphoric" pop, electropop and electro, far-reaching with a number of melodic effects generated by electronic music. A cinematic visualization with the track is accomplished by different chord progressions, making the whole song sound compact. "Ghosttown" begins with sounds of single organ chords and a dusty drum beat. Instead of being a straight-up pop ballad, the composition sounds a little "edgy", due to the usage of synth percussion and vocoder effects. Chris Rosa from VH1 stated that the song "features tight production and an ear-crashing chorus that is pure pop bliss", while Elysa Gardner from USA Today described the song as a mixture of "disarmingly earnest sweetness with a stark, chilly arrangement". The chorus appears after 40 seconds in the song, with a distortion filled pause, a thumping beat and a repetitive chord progression. "Ghosttown" is set in the time signature of common time with a moderate tempo of 79 beats per minute. It is composed in the key of D minor, with Madonna's vocals spanning from F_{3} to B♭_{4}. The song has a basic sequence of Dm–F–C–Gm during the verses and B♭–F–C–Dm during the chorus as its chord progression. Demacio "Demo" Castellon engineered and mixed the track, while Ron Taylor did additional Pro Tools editing of Madonna's vocals and Evignan provided background vocals on the song.

On March 31, 2015, Billboard premiered a remix of the song by Dutch DJ Don Diablo, who changed the ballad into an EDM track. Another set of remixes was released later as a Remix EP. Two of the remixes were released on Madonna's Tidal streaming account, including one by DJ RedTop as well as Armand Van Helden, Offer Nissim and Roger Sanchez. According to Idolator, "RedTop completely deconstructs 'Ghosttown' and turns it into something you might hear in a post-apocalyptic piano bar. It's sad and depressing yet defiantly groovy." Another remix, by Paul Andrews, gave emphasis on Madonna's vocals while adding piano and orchestra in the production. Andrews explained that the music video of "Ghosttown" was how he had imagined it, "two people in a dark place with destruction all around them, but they have each other". Hence he wanted the verse to represent the reality of the situation and the chorus would represent their view of the world because of their love. The non-dance remix was approved by Madonna and was another exclusive release to her Tidal account.

== Critical reception ==
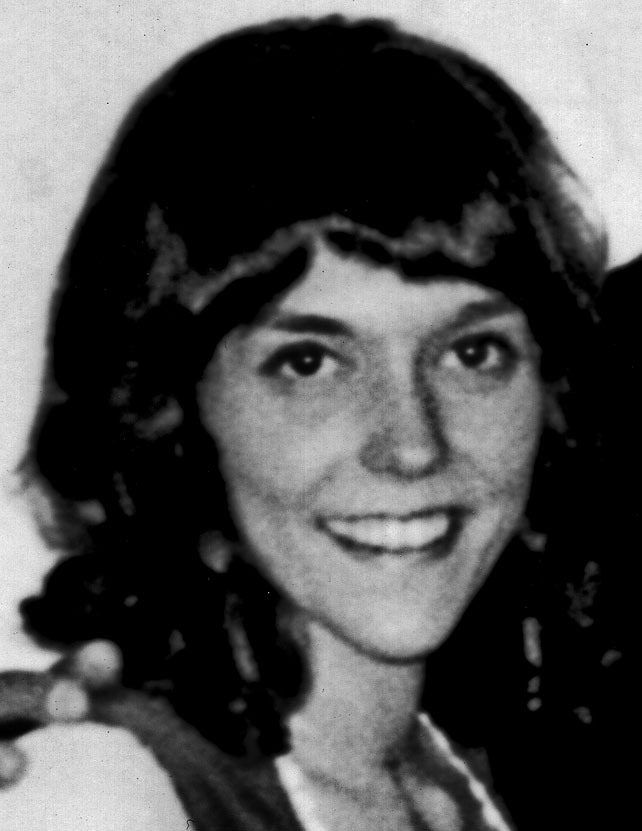
Madonna's vocals on "Ghosttown" were compared to those of Karen Carpenter.

Upon release, the track was met with critical acclaim. Hugh McIntyre from Forbes considered "Ghosttown" as a favorite from the album. Dean Piper from The Daily Telegraph considered the song as Madonna's best chance at achieving a radio hit from the album, comparing the composition to the singer's previous studio album, Ray of Light (1998). This view was shared by Gregory Ellwood of HitFix who considered it to be Madonna's "most commercially friendly ballad" of the 2010s, while Jon Lisi from PopMatters called it "arguably the most haunting love song of [Madonna's] career. The Dallas Morning News' Hunter Hauk complimented Madonna's "natural" vocal delivery in spite of the vocal effects added, also considering it to be a probable radio hit for Madonna. Daryl Deino from The Inquisitr also praised Madonna's vocals in "Ghosttown", along with "Devil Pray" and "Living for Love". Bernard Zuel from The Sydney Morning Herald found Madonna to be reliving her older ballads like "Live to Tell", and found the electronic arrangements to be complementing her vocals. Amy Pettifer from The Quietus observed that the chorus could have been sung by any other singer, but Madonna, "despite being a weaker singer, licks it in the emotional truth stakes, particularly on this more melancholy end of the spectrum. Singing with a tremulous tonality, her voice hangs in uncluttered space, the lyrics positioning her as the dark-glowing, guiding light. A brilliant, desperate and rousing anthem." Along with comparing Madonna's vocals in Ghosttown to that of Karen Carpenter, Farber also observed that it was her most "rich sounding" voice since her Evita soundtrack, comparable to "Live to Tell" and also "Crazy for You". Digital Spy's Lewis Corner rated it four out of five stars, noting that Madonna sounded "significantly more subdued and reflective compared to her handbag bangers of recent years, but by doing so it makes the biggest possible impact."

Bradley Stern from MuuMuse felt that since "Ghosttown" was a previous unheard track not present among the leaks, it was the most surprising. With the ample presence of melodies, Stern reminisced that one of the major complaints about Madonna's past few studio albums was a lack of memorable lyrics, which was dissipated with "Ghosttown". Quoting a part of the lyrics—"When the world gets cold I'll be your cover/Let's just hold onto each other."—Stern added that the song "is a gorgeously earnest, us-against-the-world anthem tailored for two souls wandering alone in this mad, mad world." Giving the song a rating of two-and-a-half out of five stars, Hardeep Phull from the New York Post described it as musically and emotionally "hectic", but found it to be tender and simple while being a "big synth-ballad of solidarity". Writing for i-D, Nick Levine felt that "Ghosttown" was enhanced as a song by the "glorious stealth bomb of a chorus". Jed Gottlieb from the Boston Herald commended Billboard's production techniques, and the blend of EDM and lyrical introspection, while focusing on the "catchy" chorus. Jon Pareles from The New York Times found the song to be a mixture of "affection and post-apocalyptic gloom", adding that "it begs for a dystopian-romance video". Michael Jose Gonzalez from Danish music magazine, Gaffa, praised Madonna's decision to give emphasis on her singing, with "trouble embossed and melodic" tracks like "Ghosttown". Writing for Gay Star News, Joe Morgan called it "arguably the best ballad of her most recent years. The chorus is beautiful, atmospheric and haunting".

For a writer from Q, "Ghosttown" displayed a "wonderful finality", while striking a tentative note. Zel McCarthy from Vice relegated the song to being an "album filler" but believed that it displayed Madonna's "vocal chops and rarely-deployed emotional sincerity". Sal Cinquemani from Slant Magazine had initially considered it as the least memorable song among the six tracks released for pre-order, however in another review for the album he explained, "A decade of disco-Madonna makes it easy to forget that she's a skilled balladeer, and the post-apocalyptic 'Ghosttown' takes a generic, contemporary-pop template (think 'Halo') and stamps it with her singular style a la 1994's Babyface-penned 'Take a Bow'." Saeed Saeed of The National described the song as a "streamlined power ballad", and complimented Madonna's pop music instincts. Rolling Stone ranked "Ghosttown" at number 16 on its year-end list to find the 50 best songs of 2015. It was also number one on their list of 10 Best Songs of 2015 through the reader's poll. While ranking Madonna's singles in honor of her 60th birthday, The Guardian's Jude Rogers placed "Ghosttown" at number 16, writing that "Madonna's lyrics and a skyscraping melody pack punches". Writing for Entertainment Weekly, Chuck Arnold opined that "its haunting atmospherics and lyrics of a post-Armageddon world, are eerily prescient of the Trump-era despair", listing it as the singer's 38th best single. On a mixed review, Paul Schrodt from Slant Magazine opined that "with its rote production and gratuitous use of Auto-Tune, ["Ghosttown"] is far from being one of Madonna's more searing ballads".

== Chart performance ==
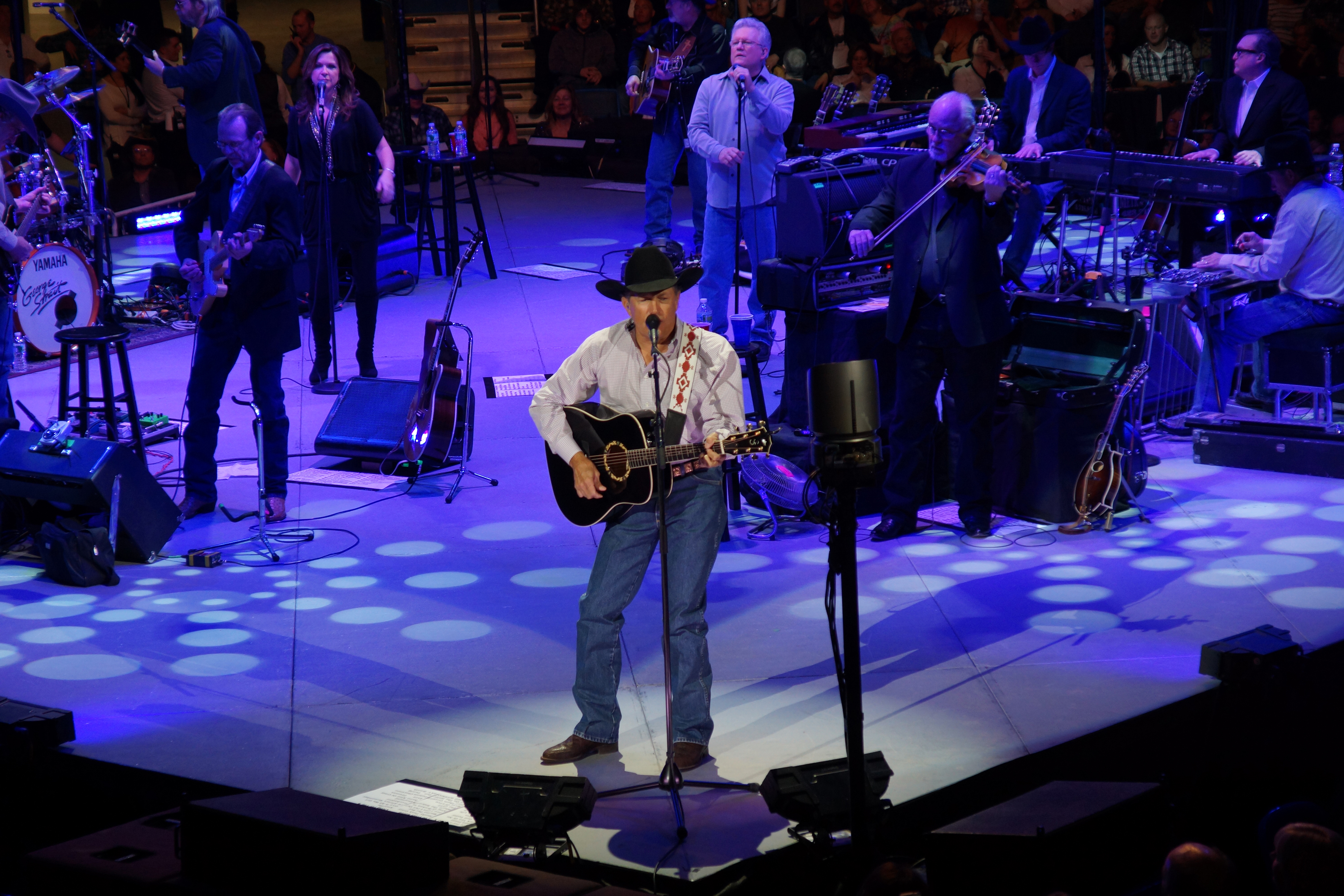
With "Ghosttown" reaching number one on the US Hot Dance Club Songs chart, Madonna broke her tie with country singer George Strait, becoming the artist with the most number-one songs on a single Billboard chart.

Following the release of the song as a pre-order, "Ghosttown" charted in a number of nations. In France, the song debuted at number 70 on the French SNEP Singles Chart, but fell down to number 105 the next week. Following the album's release, the song again entered the chart at number 60. After the release of the physical CD single, "Ghosttown" reached a new peak of number 34, while topping the SNEP Physical Singles Chart. It debuted and peaked at number 41 in Spain, staying there for two weeks. The song debuted within the top-forty in Switzerland at number 39, but was present on the chart for one week. "Ghosttown" charted outside the top-100 on the UK Singles Chart at number 117, and debuted at number 86 on the Scottish Singles Chart. In Italy, "Ghosttown" reached a peak of number 20 on the Italian FIMI Singles Chart spending 19 weeks in the top 100, while reaching a peak of number 34 on the German Media Control Charts.

In the United States, "Ghosttown" was promoted to the adult contemporary radio formats by regular radio plays on iHeartMedia owned stations. It debuted at number 21 on the Billboard Adult Contemporary chart making it her 36th entry, starting from her 1984 single "Borderline". Madonna ranks fourth on the list of artists with the most entries on the chart, preceded by Elton John (43), Celine Dion (41) and Rod Stewart (40). "Ghosttown" was Madonna's first entry on the chart since her 2006 single, "Jump". According to Billboard, the song also bubbled under the main Adult Pop Songs chart, aided by iHeart radio play. It debuted at number 38 on the chart, becoming the singer's 19th entry on the list.

For the week ending April 25, 2015, "Ghosttown" debuted at number 41 on the Hot Dance Club Songs chart. The following four weeks it was the greatest gainer in position, reaching to a peak of number one. On the week ending May 30, 2015, "Ghosttown" reached the top of the chart, becoming Madonna's 45th number-one there. She became the artist with the most number-one singles ever on a Billboard chart, breaking her tie with country singer George Strait who earned 44 number-ones on the Hot Country Singles chart. She pulled further ahead of runners-ups Beyoncé and Rihanna, who had 22 number-one songs each at that time.

== Music video ==
=== Development ===
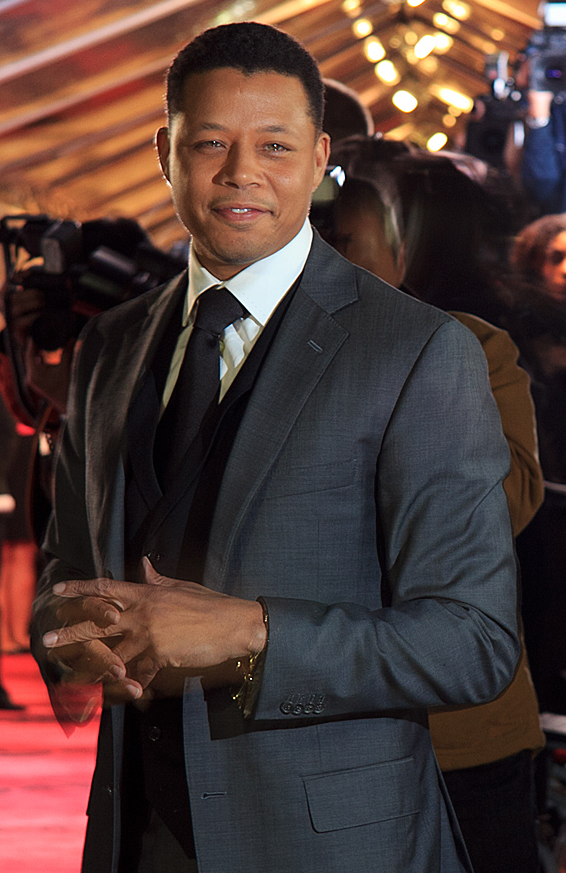
Actor Terrence Howard starred in the music video alongside Madonna.

Madonna confirmed on The Howard Stern Show that she would be filming a music video for the song in Los Angeles. Directed by Jonas Åkerlund, who had previously helmed Madonna's music videos for "Ray of Light", "Music", "American Life", "Jump" and "Celebration", the music video also starred actor Terrence Howard. The main theme behind the video was "an apocalyptic situation mimicking the end of the world", as described by Kim Peiffer from InStyle. The director came up with the concept of a dystopian future and shot it at an old steel mill. Madonna's look in the video was styled by B. Åkerlund, wife of Jonas, who blended contemporary fashion trends like military-bandleader-Victorian and gave it her signature characteristics. She created a leather greatcoat with a billowing cape, from designer label Chrome Hearts, considering the rock-n-roll silhouette of the video.

Laurie Lynn Stark, co-owner of Chrome Hearts spoke about working with Madonna on the video, with whom they had previously collaborated on photoshoots. Chrome Hearts were given a week's notice to work with Åkerlund and after a few telephone exchanges, the group met Åkerlund at their factory. The latter told them about her inspiration and concepts for the designs, and Stark's team put together the leather pieces and jacket structures, and finalized on buttons and cross patches. The task was easy for them, since both Åkerlund and Chrome Hearts had the same vision of the design in their mind, "so the challenge was how to bring it to life in the most dramatic and beautiful way." The whole costume took about a week and a total of 30 people to finish it, to achieve the "Apocalyptic meets Rock & Roll with a bit of a ship wrecked mood" vibe that Åkerlund had wanted.

Rest of the ensemble included leather, metallic combinations, green silk vest from A.F. Vandevorst, and cotton clothing from Greg Lauren. The lace shorts Madonna wore was vintage, and Åkerlund burnt up the singer's Agent Provocateur bra and applied dirt on it for giving special effects. The whole inspiration for Åkerlund behind the look was Jonas, as well as the couple's interest in rock-n-roll. Madonna approved the design, saying that "It was magical... It perfectly represented the vibe that we wanted to bring to the video." She also asked for a golf club and pocket knife to make the look more edgy. With Swedish broadcasting channel Sveriges Television, Åkerlund explained that for the opening shot, where Madonna is shown lying on the bed, she wanted boots which looked like leg braces. She contacted a designer in New York who said that he developed such pieces for fetish fashion. Åkerlund wanted him to provide the designs for arms also.

=== Release and synopsis ===
Madonna in the music video of the song, wearing the Chrome Hearts designed greatcoat with top hat, portraying a Stevie Nicks-like character

Following the completion of the shooting, Madonna posted blurry images from the video set, and on April 3, 2015, she announced that the video would be released the next week. She then uploaded a 16-second preview of the video on her Tidal streaming account. The clip showed Madonna in a black, leather outfit, running through a bleak, destroyed area, the scene interspersed with religious symbols like an immaculate heart as well as animal carcasses. The video was released on the Meerkat app on April 8. Stuart Dredge from The Guardian felt that since "[Madonna] is now one of the 16 co-owners of streaming music service Tidal, which is planning to use similarly-exclusive video premieres to promote itself," the release of the "Ghosttown" music video on Meerkat was perplexing.

The clip starts with an announcement on television that nuclear activities has destroyed cities like London, Paris, New York City, and Los Angeles. It then cuts to a room where Madonna lies in her bed watching the news about the nuclear explosion. As the song starts, a visibly distressed Madonna walks to her dressing table. She sits down and kisses a framed photograph of her mother, while looking at herself. She drapes a cape around her, picks up a golf club and a hat, and goes out of her house as the chorus of "Ghosttown" starts. Madonna is seen in what appears to be a post-apocalyptic destroyed city, where there are no signs of life and posters of the Rebel Heart album are shown burning. She looks around and walks carefully among the destruction, while twirling around the cape.

Outside, Madonna rummages debris, tries to make a phone-call from a payphone, gets frustrated, and starts smashing objects in front of her with the golf club. Her actions catches the attention of a man, played by Howard. He picks up his sniper rifle to shoot at the object of disturbance, but seeing Madonna through the lens, runs after her. They meet each other at a destroyed building where both of them notice each other and circle around with weapons in their hand. They come close and instead of attacking they throw away the weapons, embrace each other and engage in a dance-routine. After they complete their dance, and the song ends, the couple notice a little boy watching them from the destroyed building. The video ends with the couple leaving the city with the little boy hand-in-hand together with a large dog, and a panorama of the destruction.

=== Reception ===
Jason Lipshutz from Billboard described the video as a "fitting soundtrack" to the choreographed dance between Madonna and Howard, and complimented the last scene. Eliana Dockterman from Time believed that since Howard had been acting and dancing on Empire, he was signed for the video. Brett Mallec from E! shared this view but added that the duos "dancing skills aren't half bad". Louis Virtel from HitFix made 10 observations about the video, but concluded that there should have been more dance sequences to liven up the visuals, and hence could not live up to other "all-time great" Madonna releases. Kory Grow from Rolling Stone complimented the visual, saying that the "better part of the video is a mostly harrowing scene for the pop star" and compared it to the TV series The Last Man on Earth. James Elliot from Complex found the video to be "captivating" and keeping one "surprised" in spite of feeling it to be long. Sal Cinquemani from Slant Magazine called the video "campy", while describing it as a "cautionery tale" comparable with the singer's cancelled video for 2003 single, "American Life". He criticized the overall execution of the clip, saying that "In another director's hands (like, say, M's friend and frequent collaborator Steven Klein), 'Ghosttown' might have been more than just ridiculous, glorified ruin porn, but at least there are no zombies."

"Ghosttown" was nominated in the category of Short Format: Webseries, Music Video or Commercial at the 20th Art Directors Guild Awards, with the nominated personnel being art director Christian Zollenkopf, illustrator Tomo Imai, scenic artist Linda Lauderbaugh and set decorator Amy Sather Smith.

== Live performances ==
On February 26, 2015, Madonna appeared on The Jonathan Ross Show in England, which aired on March 14. She performed an edited version of "Living for Love", as well as "Ghostown" for the first time. She wore a black Marc Jacobs dress and boots while performing the songs. On March 1, Madonna was a guest on Italian TV show, Che tempo che fa (aired on March 8). While talking with host Fabio Fazio, she performed "Devil Pray" and "Ghosttown". A writer for Yahoo! noticed that both performances were warmly received by the audience, while Lionel Nicaise from MCM appreciated that Madonna put more emphasis on the melodies and her vocals during the performance, rather than costumes and stage props.

A day later, Madonna appeared on France's Le Grand Journal show. She performed an edited version of "Living for Love" and "Ghosttown". Nicaise described the performance as "an intimate interpretation of the already known ballad". Writing for Idolator, Bradley Stern described it as a "deeply emotional performance", where Madonna stood against a piano and sang the song. In the giant screens located on either side of the platform, burning cities of images were broadcast, as well as those of the World Trade Center collapses during the attack of September 11, 2001. The next performance happened at The Ellen DeGeneres Show in the United States, where Madonna sang "Ghosttown" wearing a black leather dress. She knelt down at one point during the song, and arose to sing the final chorus. Stern gave a positive feedback in MuuMuse, saying that "Madonna delivered yet another stirring performance of the post-apocalyptic tune. In fact, it was likely her best to date, from the outfit choice to the raw, emotional vocal delivery."

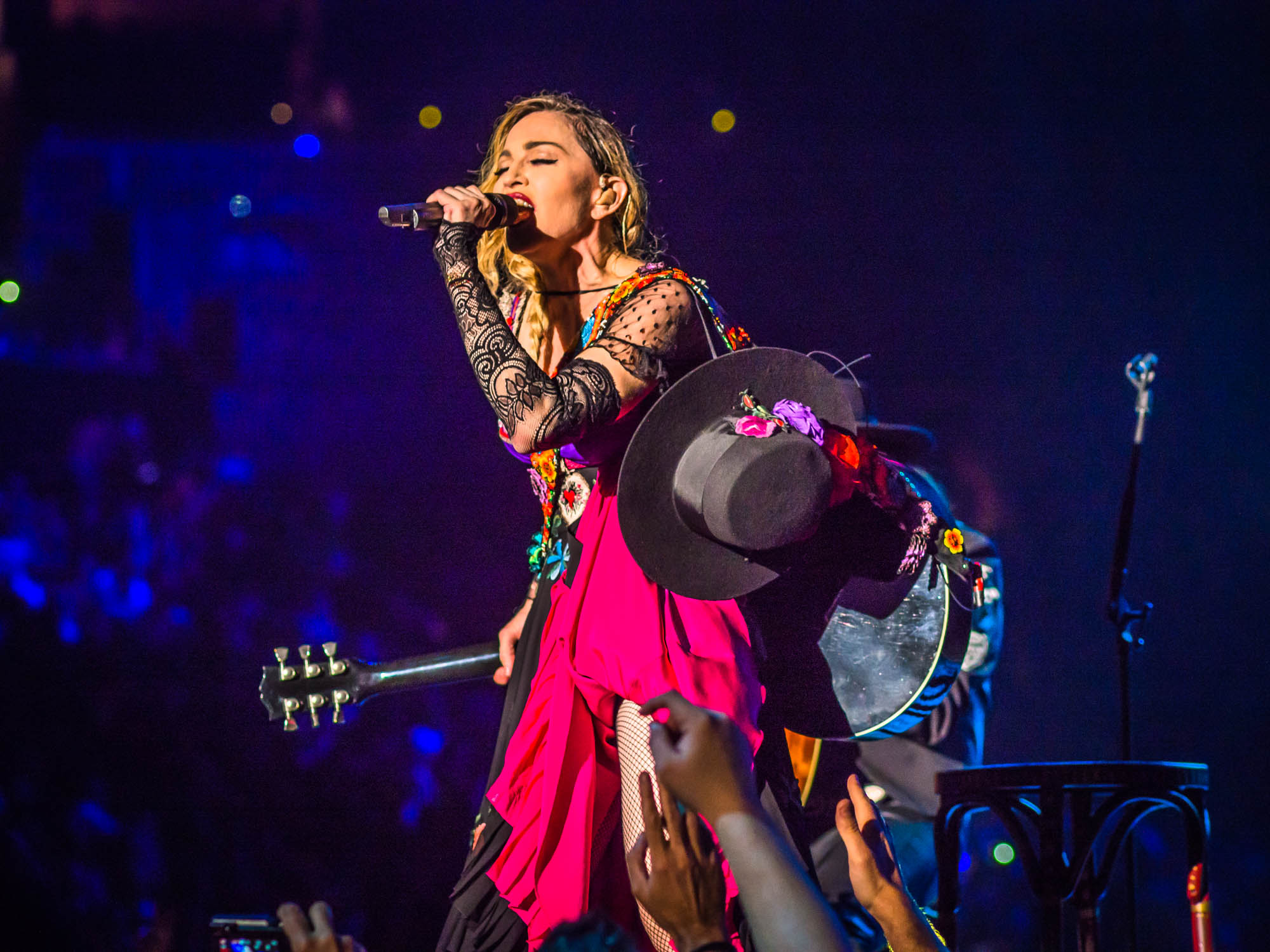
Madonna performing "Ghosttown" during the Brooklyn stop of the Rebel Heart Tour on September 19, 2015

Madonna performed an acoustic version of "Ghosttown" at the 2nd iHeartRadio Music Awards on March 29, 2015. She was accompanied by singer-songwriter Taylor Swift onstage, who played guitar. Elizabeth Vanmetre from New York Daily News noted that it was a "subdued" performance for Madonna while Mikael Wood from Los Angeles Times called it an "appealingly breezy version of the song". Cathy Applefeld Olson from Billboard declared it as the "award show's best performance", describing the duo as "kindred spirits" For Daniel D'Addario from Time, the performance was "the very best sort of collaboration", adding that Swift seemed excited to be on stage with Madonna. Ellen DeGeneres uploaded a parody video of the performance on her website. The video showed DeGeneres added by computer graphics beside Madonna and Swift, playing violin. She accidentally rips out Madonna's hair with her violin, and at the end Madonna smashes the instrument by taking it from DeGeneres, and moves away with Swift.

"Ghosttown" had been initially absent from the 2015–2016 Rebel Heart Tour. However, on the September 19, 2015, stop at Brooklyn's Barclays Center, Madonna announced that she would perform the song but it was unrehearsed. "That is the truth. So, if I make mistakes, will you forgive me?", she added and sang an acoustic version. According to Robbie Daw from Idolator the performance received positive response from the audience. Slant Magazine's Sal Cinquemani described it as a "stirring, if pitchy, rendition of [the] shoulda-been-a-sleeper-hit... which brought seemingly genuine tears to [Madonna's] eyes, a development that seemed to surprise even her". On July 27, 2017, Madonna performed "Ghosttown" at Leonardo DiCaprio's annual fundraising gala in Saint-Tropez, France.

== Track listings and formats ==
- CD single
1. "Ghosttown" – 4:09
2. "Ghosttown" (Don Diablo Remix) – 4:49
- Digital download (Remixes)
1. "Ghosttown" (Offer Nissim Drama Remix) – 7:17
2. "Ghosttown" (Armand Van Helden Remix) – 6:16
3. "Ghosttown" (S-Man Mix) – 6:08
4. "Ghosttown" (Razor N Guido Remix) – 7:46
5. "Ghosttown" (Mindskap Remix) – 5:35
6. "Ghosttown" (Don Diablo Remix) – 4:47
7. "Ghosttown" (Dirty Pop Intro Remix) – 5:20
8. "Ghosttown" (DJ Mike Cruz Mix Show Edit) – 7:05
9. "Ghosttown" (Thrill Remix) – 6:27
10. "Ghosttown" (DJ Yiannis String Intro Mix) – 1:40
11. "Ghosttown" (A Paul Andrews Reconstruction Mix) – 4:08
12. "Ghosttown" (RedTop's If I Were a Carpenter Remix) – 5:49

== Credits and personnel ==
Personnel adapted from Madonna's official website.

=== Management ===
- Webo Girl Publishing, Inc. (ASCAP) / BMG Platinum Songs o/b/o itself and Bad Robot (BMI)
- Warner-Tamerlane Publishing Corp. and East Pond Publishing (BMI) / Seven Summits Music o/b/o itself and Casbah Kid (BMI)

=== Personnel ===
- Madonna – vocals, songwriter, producer
- Billboard – producer
- Evan Bogart – songwriter
- Sean Douglas – songwriter
- Jason Evigan – songwriter, producer, background vocals
- Demacio "Demo" Castellon – engineer, mixer
- Ron Taylor – additional Pro Tools editing

== Charts ==
=== Weekly charts ===
Chart (2014–2015)	Peak position
Belgium (Ultratip Bubbling Under Flanders)	6
Belgium (Ultratip Bubbling Under Wallonia)	3
Canada AC (Billboard)	40
Finland Download (Latauslista)	14
France (SNEP)	34
Germany (GfK)	34
Hungary (Rádiós Top 40)	16
Hungary (Single Top 40)	17
Italy (FIMI)	20
Netherlands (Dutch Top 40 Tipparade)	4
Russia Airplay (Tophit)	112
Scottish Singles Sales (Official Charts)	84
Slovenia (SloTop50)	38
Spain (Promusicae)	41
Sweden (DigiListan)	20
Switzerland (Schweizer Hitparade)	39
UK Singles (OCC)	117
US Adult Contemporary (Billboard)	18
US Adult Pop Airplay (Billboard)	38
US Dance Club Songs (Billboard)	1
US Hot Singles Sales (Billboard)	3

=== Year-end charts ===
Chart (2015)	Position
France (SNEP)	190
Hungary (Rádiós Top 40)	84
Hungary (Single Top 40)	55
Italian Digital Singles (FIMI)	92

== Certifications and sales ==
Region	Certification	Certified units/sales
Italy (FIMI)	Platinum	50,000^{‡}
United States	—	44,355
^{‡} Sales+streaming figures based on certification alone.

== Release history ==
Release dates and formats for "Ghosttown"
Region	Date	Format(s)	Version	Label	Ref.
Italy	March 13, 2015	Radio airplay	Original	Interscope	
Germany	April 24, 2015	CD single	2-track	Universal	
Various	May 18, 2015	Digital download; streaming	Remixes	Interscope	

== See also ==
- Artists with the most number-ones on the U.S. dance chart
- List of number-one dance singles of 2015 (U.S.)
- Records and achievements of Madonna
