= 2015 iHeartRadio Music Awards =

US music awards ceremony in 2015

- Date: March 29, 2015
- Location: Shrine Auditorium, Los Angeles
- Hosted by: Jamie Foxx

Highlights
- Most awards: Taylor Swift (3)
- Most nominations: Sam Smith and Iggy Azalea (5)

Television/radio coverage
- Network: NBC

The 2015 iHeartRadio Music Awards was the second music award show presented by iHeartMedia's platform iHeartRadio and NBC. The awards were held on March 29, 2015, at the Shrine Auditorium in Los Angeles and were hosted by Jamie Foxx.

Taylor Swift won three awards, including Artist of the Year and Song of the Year, while Justin Timberlake was presented with the Innovator Award.

NBC's telecast of the iHeartRadio Music Awards matched the previous year's 1.7 rating with adults 18-49. Shifting from a May Thursday, it also took in 5.2 million viewers. The awards generated more than 14 billion social media impressions throughout the promotional period of the show, nearly 75 percent more than last year’s 8.5 billion and almost triple that of the 2015 Academy Awards.

== Performers ==
Artist(s)	Song(s)
Iggy Azalea; Jennifer Hudson	"Trouble"
Nick Jonas	"Chains"
Florida Georgia Line	"Sun Daze"
Meghan Trainor	"Dear Future Husband"
Kelly Clarkson	"Heartbeat Song"
Rihanna	"Bitch Better Have My Money"
Sam Smith	"Lay Me Down"
Jason Aldean	"Burnin' It Down"
Madonna; Taylor Swift (on guitar)	"Ghosttown"
Jason Derulo	"Want to Want Me"
Jamie Foxx; Chris Brown	"You Changed Me"
Nate Ruess	"Nothing Without Love"
Snoop Dogg; Charlie Wilson	"Peaches N Cream"

House DJ

- Alesso

== Presenters ==
- Gina Rodriguez — Presented Best Lyrics
- Billy Eichner — Introduced Florida Georgia Line
- Ludacris — Presented Hip Hop/R&B Song of the Year
- 5 Seconds of Summer — Introduced Meghan Trainor
- Tom Ford — Presented the Innovator Award to Justin Timberlake
- Taraji P. Henson — Introduced Rihanna
- Jeremy Piven — Presented Best New Artist
- Reba — Presented Country Song of the Year
- Meghan Trainor — Introduced Jason Aldean
- Ryan Tedder — Presented Best Fan Army
- Mike Tyson — Introduced Madonna
- Brittany Snow & Anna Camp — Presented Best Collaboration
- Alanna Masterson — Introduced Jason Derulo
- Steven Yeun — Presented Renegade
- Ryan Seacrest — Introduced Jamie Foxx and Chris Brown & Presented Artist of the Year
- Ian Ziering & The Left Shark — Presented Dance Song of the Year
- Madonna — Presented Song of the Year

== Winners and nominees ==
Artist of the Year	Song of the Year
Taylor Swift; Iggy Azalea; Luke Bryan; Ariana Grande; Sam Smith	"Shake It Off" – Taylor Swift; "All About That Bass" – Meghan Trainor; "All of Me" – John Legend; "Happy" – Pharrell Williams; "Stay with Me" – Sam Smith
Best Collaboration	Best New Artist
"Bang Bang" – Jessie J, Ariana Grande, and Nicki Minaj; "Dark Horse" – Katy Perry featuring Juicy J; "Fancy" – Iggy Azalea featuring Charli XCX; "Problem" – Ariana Grande featuring Iggy Azalea; "Talk Dirty" – Jason Derulo featuring 2 Chainz	Sam Smith; Iggy Azalea; Bastille; Cole Swindell; Meghan Trainor
Country Song of the Year	Hip Hop/R&B Song of the Year
"Burnin' It Down" – Jason Aldean; "Bartender" – Lady Antebellum; "Dirt" – Florida Georgia Line; "Give Me Back My Hometown" – Eric Church; "Play It Again" – Luke Bryan	"Don't Tell 'Em" – Jeremih featuring YG; "Drunk in Love" – Beyoncé featuring Jay Z; "Flawless" – Beyoncé; "Loyal" – Chris Brown featuring Lil Wayne and Tyga; "New Flame" – Chris Brown featuring Usher and Rick Ross
Dance Song of the Year	Alternative Rock Song of the Year
"Summer" – Calvin Harris; "Animals" – Martin Garrix; "Blame" – Calvin Harris featuring John Newman; "La La La" – Naughty Boy featuring Sam Smith; "Waves" – Mr Probz	"Take Me to Church" – Hozier; "Come with Me Now" – Kongos; "Do I Wanna Know?" – Arctic Monkeys; "Fever" – The Black Keys; "Something from Nothing" – Foo Fighters
Best Lyrics	Best Fan Army
"Blank Space" – Taylor Swift; "All of Me" – John Legend; "Counting Stars" – OneRepublic; "Habits (Stay High)" – Tove Lo; "Stay with Me" – Sam Smith; "Thinking Out Loud" – Ed Sheeran	5SOS Fam – 5 Seconds of Summer; Swifties – Taylor Swift; Arianators – Ariana Grande; Bey Hive – Beyoncé; Team Breezy – Chris Brown; Sheerios – Ed Sheeran; Church Choir – Eric Church; Directioners – One Direction; Selenators – Selena Gomez; Mendes Army – Shawn Mendes
Renegade	iHeartRadio Innovator Award
Brantley Gilbert; Iggy Azalea; Charli XCX; Hozier; Meghan Trainor	Justin Timberlake
