= Lost in My Mind =

Single by Rüfüs Du Sol

from the album Solace
- Released: 5 September 2018
- Genre: Dance; electronica
- Length: 4:20
- Label: Rüfüs Du Sol
- Songwriter(s): Jon George; Tyrone Lindqvist; James Hunt
- Producer(s): Jon George; Tyrone Lindqvist; James Hunt

Rüfüs Du Sol singles chronology
"Underwater" (2018)	"Lost in My Mind" (2018)	"Treat You Better" (2018)

"Lost in My Mind" is a song by Australian alternative dance group Rüfüs Du Sol, released on 5 September 2018, as the third single from the group's third studio album Solace.

The group wrote the song during a two-day trip to the fabled Joshua Tree desert in California. The group told Zane Lowe: "We went for a few little wonders in the desert, like on these big rock outcrops, and found some lyrics for a few of the other songs... and it's scary, man, it's scary. I mean that's what the song is about a little bit, just being content with like -- we've had some experiences out in the desert, just sort of losing some of your friends and just being like, 'You know what, I'm sweet.'"

The music video was released on 28 November 2018.

== Reception ==
Sose Fuamoli from Triple J described "Lost in My Mind" as "bringing a refreshed edge to the house music [Rüfüs Du Sol] have become known for crafting; they're definitely in a creative space that veers gleefully towards ideas of escape and an unknown atmosphere."

EDM Identity said "Featuring analog sound design and vocals that evoke escapist emotions, we can't get enough of the distorted, gritty feel of 'Lost In My Mind'".

John Ochoa from Billboard said: "'Lost in My Mind' revisits the deep club music vibe of the previously released Solace singles via its slow-burning synths, ghostly, tribal-like vocal samples and an otherworldly breakdown."

== Track listing ==
Digital single (Remixes)
No.	Title	Length
1.	"Lost in My Mind" (Icarus Remix)	5:35
2.	"No Place" (Will Clarke Remix)	5:58

== Charts ==
Chart (2018)	Peak position
Australia (ARIA)	103
US Hot Dance/Electronic Songs (Billboard)	49

== Certifications ==
Region	Certification	Certified units/sales
Australia (ARIA)	Gold	35,000^{‡}
^{‡} Sales+streaming figures based on certification alone.

== Release history ==
Country	Date	Format	Label
Australia	5 September 2018	Digital download, streaming	Rüfüs Du Sol
United States	5 September 2018	Digital download, streaming	Reprise
