= Rüfüs Du Sol =

Australian alternative dance group

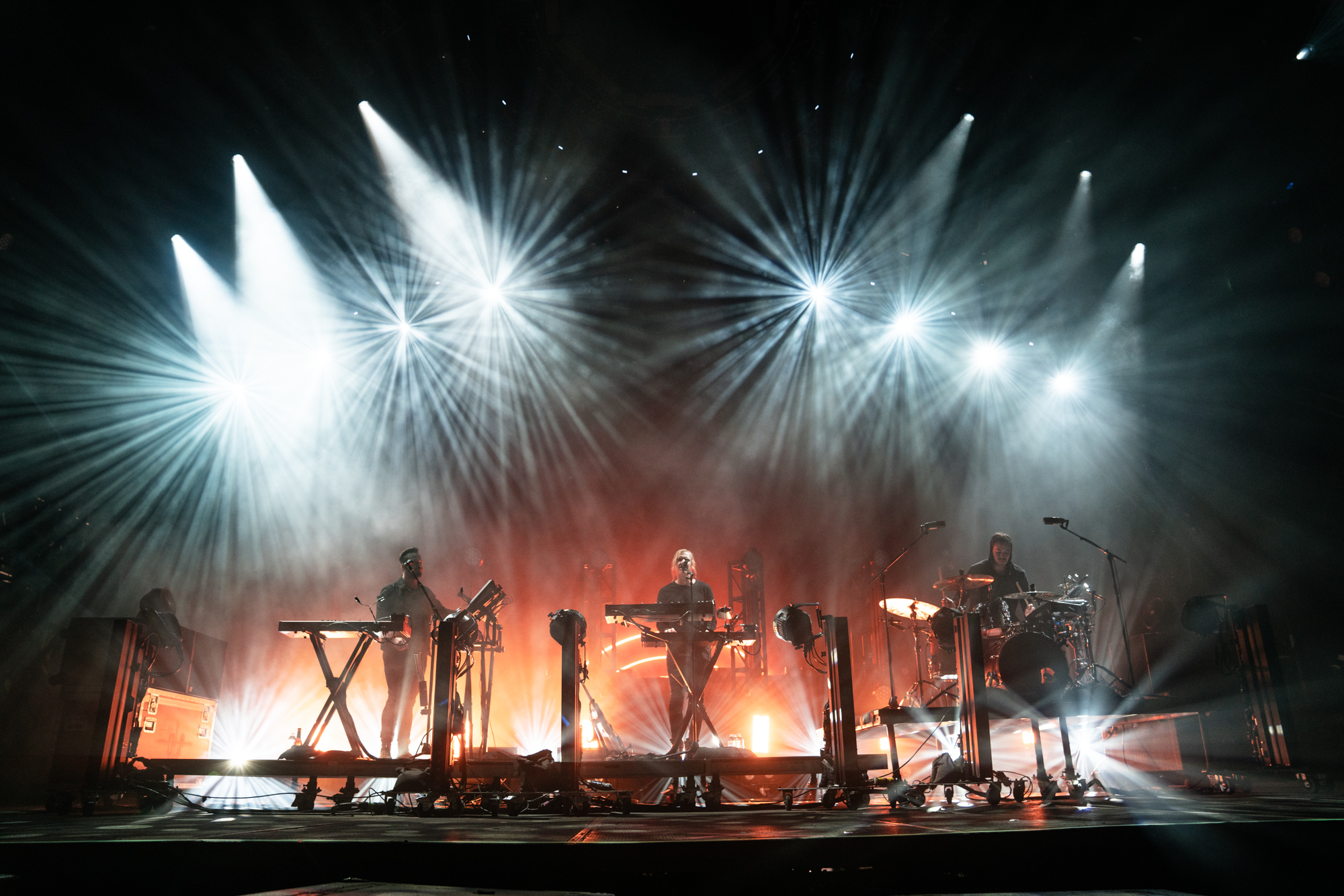
- Rüfüs Du Sol performing at the 2018 Electric Forest Festival

Background information
- Also known as: RÜFÜS (2010–2018)
- Origin: Sydney, Australia
- Genres: Alternative dance; deep house; melodic house
- Years active: 2010–present
- Labels: Sweat It Out; Sony Music Australia; Warner; Foreign Family Collective; Monekeleon; On the Fruit; Gigpiglet; Continental
- Members: Tyrone Lindqvist; Jon George; James Hunt
- Past members: Gwylim Johnstone
- Website: www.rufusdusol.com

Rüfüs Du Sol (stylised in all caps) is an Australian alternative dance group from Sydney that consists of Tyrone Lindqvist, Jon George, and James Hunt.

The band was known simply as Rüfüs (stylised in all caps) from their inception until January 2014, before changing their name to Rüfüs Du Sol – exclusively in the United States – to avoid confusion with existing funk band Rufus. In May 2018, the band adopted the name change worldwide for the sake of consistency.

Their debut album Atlas peaked at number one in Australia in 2013, and their three subsequent albums have all reached either number one or number two in their home country. While their second album Bloom debuted atop the Australian albums chart in early 2016. Their single "You Were Right" won the ARIA Award for Best Dance Release in 2015.

As part of their 2021–2023 Surrender world tour, Rüfüs Du Sol played three sold out stadium shows at Banc of California Stadium in Los Angeles. In 2022, they won the Grammy Award for Best Dance/Electronic Recording for their song "Alive".

== Career ==
=== 2010–2012: Formation ===
The band formed consisting of Jon George, Tyrone Lindqvist and James Hunt in November 2010. On 1 January 2011, they released their debut EP Rüfüs. "We Left", their debut single was released on 25 July 2011. Two tracks from the EP, "Paris Collides" and "We Left" reached numbers 8 and 13 on the Hype Machine charts simultaneously, while the video for "We Left" was nominated as one of 12 finalists internationally in the 2012 Vimeo Awards for Best Music Video.

In April 2012, Rüfüs released their second EP, Blue. The double A-sided single "This Summer"/"Selena" was released on 16 July 2012.

=== 2013–2014: Atlas ===
The band's debut studio album, Atlas, was released on 9 August 2013. It debuted at number one on the Australian Albums Chart on 25 August 2013. It was preceded by "Take Me" as the lead single on 8 March 2013, and "Desert Night" as the second single on 2 August 2013. "Tonight" was released as the third single 22 November 2013, followed by "Sundream" as the fourth single on 21 March 2014.

=== 2015–2017: Bloom ===
In June 2015, Rüfüs released "You Were Right", the lead single from their forthcoming second album. It peaked at number 22 on the Australian ARIA Singles Chart and was certified double platinum. The album Bloom was released in January 2016 and become the band's second number-one album. In 2016, they performed at both Coachella and Electric Forest.

=== 2018–2020: Solace and Solace Remixed ===
In May 2018, the band changed its name worldwide to Rüfüs Du Sol, having already made the change in the United States four years prior. Lead singer Tyrone Lindqvist explained the name change: "I guess we don't really know any other bands that have two names throughout the entire world so it just seemed fitting." Soon after, Rüfüs Du Sol released their single "No Place" on 25 May 2018. They later released the singles "Underwater" and "Lost in My Mind", along with announcing their third album Solace. In 2018, they again played at Electric Forest, while in 2019 the band's performances included Field Day, Coachella and a sold out show at Lollapalooza, Chicago. A Solace remix album was released in September 2019. At the ARIA Music Awards of 2019, Solace was nominated for three ARIA Music Awards. In 2020, the band headlined CRSSD Fest in San Diego.

=== 2020: Live from Joshua Tree ===
In 2020, the band recorded a live album from Joshua Tree, California entitled Rüfüs Du Sol: Live from Joshua Tree. The 45-minute album and accompanying feature film, shot in Joshua Tree National Park, included music from the band's three albums to date: Bloom, Atlas and Solace. The film was directed by Alexander George, and was presented by Mixmag and the band's label Rose Avenue Records. It premiered at the Vista Theatre in Los Angeles in February 2020, before being digitally released in March 2020.

=== 2021–2023: Surrender ===
On 13 July 2021, the band released "Alive"; their first song in three years. In a press statement, Lindqvist said, "It's a heavier song in some ways, but at its core it's hopeful." The follow-up single "Next to Me" was released on 11 August 2021. Jon George said it "is a song of devotion, caring compassion and pure love." On 24 September 2021, they released the single "On My Knees". On the same day, they also announced their fourth studio album, Surrender, which was released on 21 October 2021. The album was primarily recorded during a seven-week residency at a recording facility in Pioneertown, California, during the COVID-19 pandemic. They embarked on a two-year global tour of Surrender in 2021, completing it in 2023. In 2021, they played three sold out stadium shows at Banc of California Stadium, as well as performing at the Hollywood Bowl, Red Rocks Amphitheatre in Colorado, The Gorge Amphitheatre, and Gunnersbury Park in London. In 2022, after two prior nominations, the band won their first Grammy Award for Best Dance/Electronic Recording, for their song "Alive".

In October 2022, the band launched Mate Maker Co., a line of hard kombucha drinks, with the help of Justin Medcraft, ex-global senior brand manager at Diageo and brand director at Pabst Brewing Company, their artist manager Danny Robson, and drinks trade expert Tom Appleton.

In 2023, they headlined Oshega Festival in Montreal, and Beyond The Valley in Melbourne.

=== 2024–present: Inhale / Exhale ===
On 11 September 2024 the band announced that they would release their fifth studio album, Inhale / Exhale on 11 October 2024. Rüfüs Du Sol toured the world in support of the album from March 2025 to September 2026. The tour sold approximately 1.7 million tickets with a gross revenue of $158 million, making it the first dance-music tour to surpass $100 million, and the first to sell more than one million tickets.

In November 2026, the group reimagined "Innerbloom" with Hans Zimmer, to celebrate the 10th anniversary of Bloom.

== Band members ==
- Tyrone Lindqvist – vocals, guitar, keyboards
- Jon George – keyboards
- James Hunt – drums

== Discography ==
=== Albums ===
==== Studio albums ====
Title	Details	Peak chart positions				Certifications
Title	Details	AUS	NZ	SWI	US	Certifications
Atlas	Released: 9 August 2013 (AU); Label: Sweat It Out; Formats: CD, LP, digital download	1	—	—	—	ARIA: Platinum
Bloom	Released: 22 January 2016; Label: Sweat It Out; Formats: CD, LP, digital download	1	14	—	—	ARIA: Platinum; RMNZ: 2× Platinum
Solace	Released: 19 October 2018; Label: Rose Avenue, Sony Music Australia; Formats: CD, LP, digital download, streaming	2	32	—	—	ARIA: Gold; RMNZ: Gold
Surrender	Released: 22 October 2021; Label: Rose Avenue, Warner; Formats: CD, LP, digital download, streaming	1	27	89	—	RMNZ: Gold
Inhale / Exhale	Released: 11 October 2024; Label: Rose Avenue, Reprise; Formats: CD, LP, digital download, streaming	3	23	18	179	
"—" denotes items which were not released in that country or failed to chart.

==== Live albums ====
Title	Details	Peak chart positions
Title	Details	AUS
Live from Joshua Tree	Released: 6 March 2020; Label: Rose Avenue, Reprise; Formats: Digital download, streaming LP	14

==== Remix albums ====
Title	Details	Peak chart positions
Title	Details	AUS
Solace Remixed	Released: 6 September 2019; Label: Rose Avenue; Format: digital, 2×CD, 2×LP	69
Surrender (Remixes)	Released: 12 August 2022; Label: Rose Avenue; Format: digital	—
Inhale / Exhale Remixed	Released: 2 May 2025; Label: Rose Avenue; Format: digital, 2×LP	—
Inhale / Exhale Remixed, Vol. 2	Released: 6 June 2025; Label: Rose Avenue; Format: digital	—

==== Extended plays ====
Title	Details
Rüfüs	Released: 1 January 2011 (AU); Label: Monekeleon; Format: CD, DD
Blue	Released: 6 April 2012 (AU); Label: Gigpiglet; Format: CD, DD

=== Singles ===
Title	Year	Peak chart positions				Certifications	Album
Title	Year	AUS	AUS Indie	NZ Hot	US Dance/ Elec.	Certifications	Album
"We Left"	2011	—	—	—	—		Rüfüs
"This Summer" / "Selena"	2012	—	—	—	—		Blue
"Take Me"	2013	61	2	—	—	ARIA: 2× Platinum; RMNZ: Gold	Atlas
"Desert Night"	2013	67	4	—	—	ARIA: Platinum	Atlas
"Tonight"	2013	87	9	—	—	ARIA: Gold	Atlas
"Sundream"	2014	47	5	—	—	ARIA: 2× Platinum; RMNZ: Platinum	Atlas
"You Were Right"	2015	22	1	—	—	ARIA: 6× Platinum; RMNZ: 3× Platinum	Bloom
"Like an Animal"	2015	44	4	—	—	ARIA: 3× Platinum; RMNZ: Platinum	Bloom
"Innerbloom" (solo or What So Not remix)	2015	65	5	—	—	ARIA: 3× Platinum; RMNZ: 3× Platinum	Bloom
"Say a Prayer for Me"	2016	58	4	—	—	ARIA: 2× Platinum	Bloom
"Be with You"	2016	—	—	—	—		Bloom
"No Place"	2018	41	—N/a (Note: In 2018, Rüfüs Du Sol's music was distributed by Sony Music Australia as such, their songs are ineligible for the Australian Indie chart.)	—	31	ARIA: Platinum	Solace
"Underwater"	2018	77	—N/a	—	42	ARIA: Platinum; RMNZ: Gold	Solace
"Lost in My Mind"	2018	103	—N/a	—	49	ARIA: Gold	Solace
"Treat You Better"	2018	158	—N/a	—	28	ARIA: Platinum; RMNZ: Platinum	Solace
"Alive"	2021	62	8	16	18		Surrender
"Next to Me"	2021	60	8	22	19	RMNZ: Gold	Surrender
"On My Knees"	2021	22	6	17	14	RMNZ: Platinum	Surrender
"I Don't Wanna Leave"	2021	70	—	10	20		Surrender
"Something in the Way" (Like a Version)	2023	—	—	—	—		Non-album single
"Music Is Better"	2024	— (Note: "Music Is Better" did not enter the Australian top 100, but peaked at number 17 on the ARIA Australian Artist Singles Chart)	2	18	35	ARIA: Gold	Inhale / Exhale
"Lately"	2024	— (Note: "Lately" did not enter the Australian top 100, but peaked at number 17 on the ARIA Australian Artist Singles Chart)	—	16	30		Inhale / Exhale
"Break My Love"	2024	— (Note: "Break My Love" did not enter the Australian top 100, but peaked at number 20 on the ARIA Australian Artist Singles Chart)	4	16	28		Inhale / Exhale
"Pressure"	2024	—	13	13	30		Inhale / Exhale
"Innerbloom" (reimagined) (with Hans Zimmer)	2026	—	—	—	—		Non-album single
"—" denotes a recording that did not chart or was not released in that territory.

=== Other charted songs ===
Title	Year	Peak chart positions		Album
Title	Year	NZ Hot	US Dance/ Elec.	Album
"Make It Happen"	2021	38	24	Surrender
"See You Again"	2021	—	34	Surrender
"Wildfire"	2021	—	47	Surrender
"Surrender" (featuring Curtis Harding)	2021	—	37	Surrender
"Devotion"	2021	—	42	Surrender
"Always"	2021	—	39	Surrender
"Inhale"	2024	30	44	Inhale / Exhale
"Breathe"	2024	—	45	Inhale / Exhale
"Levitating"	2024	16	32	Inhale / Exhale
"In the Moment"	2024	—	21	Inhale / Exhale

=== Music videos ===
Title	Year	Director(s)
"We Left"	2011	Katzki
"This Summer"	2012	Katzki
"Take Me"	2013	Katzki
"Desert Night"	2013	Katzki
"Tonight"	2013	Katzki
"Sundream"	2014	Katzki and Jackson Mullane
"You Were Right"	2015	Katzki
"Like an Animal"	2015	Katzki
"Say a Prayer for Me"	2016	Toby + Pete
"Be with You"	2016	Daperis Brothers
"Innerbloom"	2016	Katzki
"No Place"	2018	Katzki
"Lost in My Mind"	2018	Drew Kirsch
"Treat You Better"	2019	Leah Barylsky & Katzki
"Next to Me"	2021	Osk
"Alive"	2021	James Frost
"On My Knees"	2021	Katzki & Ruff Mercy
"I Don't Wanna Leave"	2021	Katzki
"Lately"	2024	
"Break My Love"	2024	
"Music Is Better"	2024	
"Pressure"	2024	

== Awards and nominations ==
Rüfüs Du Sol have won an AIR Award: Best Independent Dance, Electronica Album, for Atlas (2014), two Electronic Music Awards: Record of the Year, for Innerbloom (Sasha remix, 2017), and Live Act of the Year (2017), and four ARIA Awards: Best Dance Release, for You Were Right (2015), Best Dance Release, for Solace (2019), Best Group (2021), Best Dance Release, for Alive (2021), with a fifth ARIA won by their mix engineer Cassian, Best Mixed Album, for Surrender (2022).

The band has also won a Grammy Award: Best Dance Recording, for Alive (2022), an APRA Award: Most Performed Dance/ Electronic Work of the Year, for On My Knees (2023), and a National Live Music Award: Best DJ/ Electronic Act (2023).

=== AIR Awards ===
The Australian Independent Record Awards (commonly known informally as AIR Awards) is an annual awards night to recognise, promote and celebrate the success of Australia's Independent Music sector.

Year	Nominee / work	Award	Result
2013	RÜFÜS	Carlton Dry Global Music Grant	Nominated
2013	"Take Me"	Best Independent Dance/Electronica or Club Single	Nominated
2014	Atlas	Best Independent Album	Nominated
2014	Atlas	Best Independent Dance, Electronica Album	Won
2014	"Sundream"	Best Independent Dance, Electronica or Club Single	Nominated
2015	"You Were Right"	Best Independent Dance, Electronica or Club Single	Nominated

=== APRA Awards ===
The APRA Awards are held in Australia and New Zealand by the Australasian Performing Right Association to recognise songwriting skills, sales and airplay performance by its members annually. Rüfüs Du Sol has been nominated for one award.

Year	Nominee / work	Award	Result	Ref.
2020	"Treat You Better"	Most Performed Dance Work of the Year	Nominated	
2023	"On My Knees"	Most Performed Australian Work of the Year	Nominated	
2023	"On My Knees"	Most Performed Dance / Electronic Work of the Year	Won	
2026	"Break My Love"	Most Performed Dance/Electronic Work	Nominated	

=== ARIA Music Awards ===
The annual ARIA Music Awards have been presented since 1987 by the Australian Recording Industry Association (ARIA). RÜFÜS/Rüfüs Du Sol have won five awards from thirty-two nominations.

Year	Nominee / work	Award	Result
2013	Atlas	Breakthrough Artist – Release	Nominated
2013	Atlas	Best Dance Release	Nominated
2014	"Sundream"	Best Group	Nominated
2014	"Sundream"	Best Dance Release	Nominated
2014	Words Within Worlds Tour	Best Australian Live Act	Nominated
2015	"You Were Right"	Best Dance Release	Won
2016	Bloom	Album of the Year	Nominated
2016	Bloom	Best Group	Nominated
2016	Bloom	Best Dance Release	Nominated
2016	Bloom Tour	Best Australian Live Act	Nominated
2016	Jack Vanzet for RÜFÜS' Bloom	Best Cover Art	Nominated
2018	"No Place"	Best Group	Nominated
2018	"No Place"	Best Dance Release	Nominated
2019	Solace	Album of the Year	Nominated
2019	Solace	Best Group	Nominated
2019	Solace	Best Dance Release	Won
2020	2019 Summer Festival Tour	Best Australian Live Act	Nominated
2021	"Alive"	Best Group	Won
2021	"Alive"	Best Dance Release	Won
2022	Surrender	Album of the Year	Nominated
2022	Surrender	Best Group	Nominated
2022	Surrender	Best Dance/Electronic Release	Nominated
2022	"On My Knees"	Best Pop Release	Nominated
2022	"On My Knees"	Song of the Year	Nominated
2022	"I Don't Wanna Leave" – Rüfüs Du Sol, Katzki	Best Video	Nominated
2022	Cassian for Rüfüs Du Sol Surrender	Mix Engineer – Best Mixed Album	Nominated
2022	Rufus Du Sol for Rufus Du Soul - Surrender	Producer - Best Produced Album	Won
2023	Rüfüs Du Sol Australian 2022 Tour	Best Australian Live Act	Nominated
2024	"Music Is Better"	Best Group	Nominated
2024	"Music Is Better"	Best Dance/Electronic Release	Nominated
2024	"Lately" - Rüfüs Du Sol, Katzki	Best Video	Nominated
2024	Rüfüs Du Sol 2024 Australian Summer Tour Dates	Best Australian Live Act	Nominated
2025	Inhale / Exhale	Album of the Year	Nominated
2025	Inhale / Exhale	Best Group	Nominated
2025	Inhale / Exhale	Best Produced Release	Nominated
2025	Alexander George (Katzki) for Rüfüs Du Sol – "Break My Love"	Best Video	Nominated

=== Electronic Dance Music Awards ===
The Electronic Dance Music Awards are presented by iHeart Radio and commenced in 2022.

Year	Nominee / work	Award	Result	Ref.
2023	Rüfüs Du Sol - Art of the Wild, The Wynn, Las Vegas, NV	Best Performance Arena/Festival	Nominated	
2025	Rüfüs Du Sol	Dance Radio Artist of the Year	Nominated	
2025	Inhale / Exhale	Favourite Album	Nominated	

=== Electronic Music Awards ===
The Electronic Music Awards was award show with an emphasis on the electronic music genre. It occurred once in 2017. Rüfüs Du Sol have won two awards from three nominations.

Year	Category	Nominated Artist / Work	Result
2017	Record of the Year	"Innerbloom" (Sasha remix)	Won
2017	Remix of the Year	"Innerbloom" (Sasha remix)	Nominated
2017	Live Act of the Year	Rüfüs Du Sol	Won

=== Grammy Awards ===
The Grammy Awards are an annual award ceremony presented by The Recording Academy, recognising achievements in the music industry.

Year	Nominee / work	Award	Result	Ref.
2020	Solace	Best Dance/Electronic Album	Nominated	
2020	"Underwater"	Best Dance Recording	Nominated	
2022	"Alive"	Best Dance Recording	Won	
2023	"On My Knees"	Best Dance Recording	Nominated	
2023	Surrender	Best Dance/Electronic Album	Nominated	
2026	Inhale / Exhale	Best Dance/Electronic Album	Nominated	

=== J Awards ===
The J Awards are an annual series of Australian music awards that were established by the Australian Broadcasting Corporation's youth-focused radio station Triple J. They commenced in 2005.

Year	Nominee / work	Award	Result	Ref.
2013	Atlas	Australian Album of the Year	Nominated	
2018	Solace	Australian Album of the Year	Nominated	
2021	Surrender	Australian Album of the Year	Nominated	
2024	Inhale/Exhale	Australian Album of the Year	Nominated	

=== National Live Music Awards ===
The National Live Music Awards (NLMAs) commenced in 2016 to recognise contributions to the live music industry in Australia.

Year	Nominee / work	Award	Result	Ref.
2016	Themselves	Live Electronic Act (or DJ) of the Year	Nominated	
2016	Themselves	International Live Achievement (Group)	Nominated	
2019	Themselves	Live Electronic Act (or DJ) of the Year	Nominated	
2019	Themselves	International Live Achievement (Group)	Nominated	
2023	Matthew Smith and Alex 'Katzki' George (Rüfüs Du Sol)	Best Stage & Light Design	Nominated	
2023	Rüfüs Du Sol	Best DJ/Electronic Act	Won	

=== NSW Music Prize ===
The NSW Music Prize aims to "celebrate, support and incentivise" the NSW's most talented artists, with "the aim of inspiring the next generations of stars". It commenced in 2025.

Year	Nominee / work	Award	Result	Ref.
2025	Inhale/Exhale	NSW Music Prize	Nominated	

=== Rolling Stone Australia Awards ===
The Rolling Stone Australia Awards are awarded annually in January or February by the Australian edition of Rolling Stone magazine for outstanding contributions to popular culture in the previous year.

Year	Nominee / work	Award	Result	Ref.
2022	Rüfüs Du Sol	Rolling Stone Readers' Choice Award	Nominated	
2022	Rüfüs Du Sol	Rolling Stone Global Award	Nominated	
2022	"Alive"	Best Single	Nominated	
2023	Rüfüs Du Sol	Rolling Stone Global Award	Nominated	
2025	Inhale/Exhale	Best LP/EP	Shortlisted	
2025	"Lately"	Best Single	Shortlisted	
