= Treat You Better (Rüfüs Du Sol song) =

Single by Rüfüs Du Sol

from the album Solace
- Released: 9 November 2018
- Length: 3:38
- Label: Rose Avenue
- Songwriter(s): Mark Foster; Jason Evigan; Jon George; Tyrone Lindqvist; James Hunt
- Producer(s): Jon George; Tyrone Lindqvist; James Hunt; Jason Evigan

Rüfüs Du Sol singles chronology
| "Lost in My Mind" (2018) | "Treat You Better" (2018) | "Alive" (2021) |

"Treat You Better" is a song by Australian alternative dance group Rüfüs Du Sol, released on 9 November 2018, as the fourth and final single from the group's third studio album Solace (2018).

Upon release, the band said "It felt like a song we wrote to ourselves and to our loved ones during what was a testing time for us all personally. We were originally going to get a gospel choir for the end of this song but thought better of it when we realized we had so many talented friends with amazing voices around us. We invited them to the studio and just spent a full day playing and recording with them. It's so special to share this song with such a talented and kind-hearted group of people."

At the APRA Music Awards of 2020, "Treat You Better" was nominated for Most Performed Dance Work of the Year.

== Music video ==
The music video for "Treat You Better" was directed by Leah Barylsky & Katzki and released on 28 February 2019.

== Track listing ==
Digital single
| No. | Title | Length |
|---|---|---|
| 1. | "Treat You Better" | 3:38 |

Digital single (Remixes)
| No. | Title | Length |
|---|---|---|
| 1. | "Treat You Better" (Purple Disco Machine Remix) | 4:17 |
| 2. | "Treat You Better" (Purple Disco Machine Extended Remix) | 8:23 |

Digital single (Remixes 2)
| No. | Title | Length |
|---|---|---|
| 1. | "Treat You Better" (Cassian Remix) | 4:50 |
| 2. | "Treat You Better" (album version) | 4:33 |
| 3. | "Treat You Better" (Cassian extended Remix) | 6:55 |

== Charts ==
=== Weekly charts ===
| Chart (2018–19) | Peak position |
|---|---|
| Australian Artist Singles (ARIA) | 18 |
| Australia (ARIA) | 158 |
| US Alternative Airplay (Billboard) | 25 |
| US Hot Dance/Electronic Songs (Billboard) | 28 |

=== Year-end charts ===
| Chart (2019) | Position |
|---|---|
| Australian Artist (ARIA) | 45 |
| US Hot Dance/Electronic Songs (Billboard) | 96 |

== Certifications ==
| Region | Certification | Certified units/sales |
|---|---|---|
| Australia (ARIA) | Platinum | 70,000^{‡} |
| Canada (Music Canada) | Gold | 40,000^{‡} |
^{‡} Sales+streaming figures based on certification alone.

== Release history ==
| Country | Date | Format | Label |
|---|---|---|---|
| Australia | 9 November 2018 | Digital download, streaming | Rose Avenue Records |
