= Underwater (Rüfüs Du Sol song) =

Single by Rüfüs Du Sol

from the album Solace
- Released: 10 August 2018
- Genre: Deep house; indietronica
- Length: 5:49
- Label: Rüfüs Du Sol
- Songwriters: Jon George; Tyrone Lindqvist; James Hunt
- Producers: Jon George; Tyrone Lindqvist; James Hunt

Rüfüs Du Sol singles chronology
"No Place" (2018)	"Underwater" (2018)	"Lost in My Mind" (2018)

"Underwater" is a song by Australian alternative dance group Rüfüs Du Sol, released on 10 August 2018 as the second single from their third studio album Solace (2018).

In November 2019, the song received a nomination for Best Dance Recording at the 62nd Annual Grammy Awards.

== Reception ==
Sose Fuamoli from Triple J described "Underwater" as "an envelope pusher when it comes to production" adding that "thumping beats and Tyrone Lindqvist's soaring vocals have pulled the band right back into our eyeline, front and centre."

Kat Benin from Billboard said "'Underwater' sounds like its title. It opens with blinking, repetitive synth, murky as if coming through depths of blue. A chorus of ghostly voices lures you deeper as singer Tyrone Lindqvist whispers you to move further away. You can't, of course. You're completely trapped by RÜFÜS' dark magic. If you like a little creepiness with your cool, dig that flatline beat at the end."

The song was voted in at #22 in the world's largest annual music poll, the Triple J Hottest 100, in 2018.

== Track listings ==
Digital single
No.	Title	Length
1.	"Underwater"	5:49

Digital single (Remixes)
No.	Title	Length
1.	"Underwater" (Adam Port Remix)	6:39
2.	"Underwater" (Club edit)	7:54
3.	"Underwater" (Dub edit)	7:55

Digital single (Remixes)
No.	Title	Length
1.	"Underwater" (Willaris. K Remix)	9:06
2.	"Underwater" (Yotto's Dusk Remix)	5:01
3.	"Underwater" (Yotto's Dawn Remix)	5:38
4.	"Underwater" (NWYR Festival Mix)	2:08

== Charts ==
Chart (2018)	Peak position
Australia (ARIA)	77
US Hot Dance/Electronic Songs (Billboard)	42

== Certifications ==
Region	Certification	Certified units/sales
Australia (ARIA)	Platinum	70,000^{‡}
Canada (Music Canada)	Gold	40,000^{‡}
New Zealand (RMNZ)	Platinum	30,000^{‡}
^{‡} Sales+streaming figures based on certification alone.

== Release history ==
Country	Date	Format	Label
Australia	10 August 2018	Digital download, streaming	Rüfüs Du Sol
United States	10 August 2018	Digital download, streaming	Reprise
