= No Place (song) =

Single by Rüfüs Du Sol

from the album Solace
- Released: 25 May 2018
- Recorded: California
- Length: 3:58
- Label: Rüfüs Du Sol
- Songwriters: Jon George; Tyrone Lindqvist; James Hunt
- Producers: Jon George; Tyrone Lindqvist; James Hunt

Rüfüs Du Sol singles chronology
"Be with You" (2016)	"No Place" (2018)	"Underwater" (2018)

"No Place" is a song by Australian alternative dance group Rüfüs Du Sol. The song was released on 25 May 2018 as the lead single from the group's third studio album Solace. It is also the first release after the group's formal name change to Rüfüs Du Sol, which they previously went by in North America only. The group said: "'No Place' is the first piece of music from an album we've been working on solidly for over a year now. It took about a year to find the song we felt right about as the first piece of music from this record. We knew as soon as we heard it come out of the speakers that this was how we wanted to greet people this time around. It feels good to be back."

At the ARIA Music Awards of 2018, "No Place" was nominated for two awards; Best Group and Best Dance Release.

== Reception ==
Jackson Langford from Music Feeds said "No Place" "is a glorious return to form for the Sydney trio, complete with silky smooth vocals, infectious bass drops and an overall summery feel that they've become the master of." Ryan Middleton from Magnetic Mag said ""No Place" has the Rüfüs Du Sol sound that they have honed over their last two albums", adding "it also has a darker, clubbier side to it with some booming horns and melancholic strings. However, their jogging percussion and soothing melodies has everything fans will want." Kat Bein from Billboard described the song as "a haunting, ethereal groove that's infectiously melodic with a slight tinge of eeriness." In a review of the album, David from auspOp said "'No Place' was chosen as the lead single for good reason. Its hypnotic rhythms paired with catchy hooks and great sonic layering make it a brilliant moment on this album."

== Track listing ==
Digital single
No.	Title	Length
1.	"No Place"	3:58

Digital single (Remixes)
No.	Title	Length
1.	"No Place" (Lindstrøm & Prins Thomas Remix)	10:29
2.	"No Place" (Club edit)	5:58

== Charts ==
Chart (2018)	Peak position
Australia (ARIA)	41
US Hot Dance/Electronic Songs (Billboard)	31

== Certifications ==
Region	Certification	Certified units/sales
Australia (ARIA)	Platinum	70,000^{‡}
^{‡} Sales+streaming figures based on certification alone.

== Release history ==
Country	Date	Format	Label
Australia	25 May 2018	Digital download, streaming	Rüfüs Du Sol
United States	25 May 2018	Digital download, streaming	Reprise
