= Violent Soho discography =

- Studio albums: 5
- EPs: 1
- Singles: 25

The discography of Violent Soho, an Australian alternative rock group, consists of five studio albums, one extended plays and twenty-five singles.

== Studio albums ==
Title	Details	Peak chart positions	Certifications
Title	Details	AUS	Certifications
We Don't Belong Here	Released: 7 June 2008; Label: Emergency Music; Formats: CD, digital download	—	
Violent Soho	Released: 9 March 2010; Label: Universal Motown, Ecstatic Peace; Formats: CD, digital download	—	
Hungry Ghost	Released: 6 September 2013; Label: I Oh You; Formats: CD, LP, digital download, streaming	2	ARIA: Platinum
Waco	Released: 18 March 2016; Label: I Oh You; Formats: CD, LP, digital download, streaming	1	ARIA: Gold
Everything Is A-OK	Released: 3 April 2020; Label: I Oh You; Formats: CD, LP, digital download, streaming	1	

== Extended plays ==
Title	Details
Pigs & T.V.	Released: 2006; Label: Victim Records; Format: CD, DD

== Singles ==
List of singles, with year released, selected chart positions and certifications, and album name shown
Title	Year	AUS	CAN Rock	US Alt.	US Rock	JJJ Hottest 100	Certifications	Album
"My Pal/Task Force"	2009	—	—	—	—	—		Non-album single
"Jesus Stole My Girlfriend"	2010	—	33	21	35	—		Violent Soho
"Muscle Junkie"	2010	—	—	—	—	—		Violent Soho
"Son of Sam/Bombs Over Broadway"	2010	—	—	—	—	—		Violent Soho
"Tinderbox"	2012	—	—	—	—	170		Non-album singles
"Neighbour Neighbour"	2012	—	—	—	—	147		Non-album singles
"In the Aisle"	2013	—	—	—	—	137		Hungry Ghost
"Covered in Chrome"	2013	80	—	—	—	4	ARIA: Platinum	Hungry Ghost
"Saramona Said"	2014	—	—	—	—	187	ARIA: Gold	Hungry Ghost
"Fur Eyes"	2014	—	—	—	—	—		Hungry Ghost
"Domestic Lala"	2015	—	—	—	—	—		Non-album singles
"Home Haircut"	2015	—	—	—	—	—		Non-album singles
"Like Soda"	2015	81	—	—	—	15	ARIA: Platinum	Waco
"Viceroy"	2016	—	—	—	—	14	ARIA: Platinum	Waco
"So Sentimental"	2016	—	—	—	—	69		Waco
"Blanket"	2016	—	—	—	—	53		Waco
"No Shade"	2016	—	—	—	—	73		Waco
"How to Taste"	2017	—	—	—	—	92		Waco
"A-OK"	2019	—	—	—	—	—		Everything Is A-OK
"Vacation Forever"	2019	—	—	—	—	69		Everything Is A-OK
"Lying on the Floor"	2020	—	—	—	—	117		Everything Is A-OK
"Pick It Up Again"	2020	—	—	—	—	113		Everything Is A-OK
"Canada"	2020	—	—	—	—	—		Everything Is A-OK
"Slow Down Sonic"	2020	—	—	—	—	—		Everything Is A-OK
"Kamikaze"	2022	—	—	—	—	78		Non-album singles
"Better Homes and Gardens"	2022	—	—	—	—	—		Non-album singles

== Music videos ==
Year	Album	Title	Director	Notes	Reference
2006	Pigs & T.V.	"Bombs Over Broadway"	Katie Ridley		
2009	We Don't Belong Here	"Love Is a Heavy Word"	Noel Smyth		
2010	Violent Soho	"Jesus Stole My Girlfriend"	Colin Tilley	Australian Version	
2010	Violent Soho	"Son of Sam"	Dan Mancini		
2010	Violent Soho	"Jesus Stole My Girlfriend"	Dan Mancini	U.S. Version	
2010	Violent Soho	"Muscle Junkie"	Jason Zada		
2012	Tinderbox/Neighbour Neighbour	"Neighbour Neighbour"	Tristan Houghton		
2013	Hungry Ghost	"In The Aisle"	Tristan Houghton		
2013	Hungry Ghost	"Dope Calypso"	Timothy O'Keefe		
2013	Hungry Ghost	"Covered in Chrome"	Dan Graetz	ARIA Award for Best Video 2014 Nomination	
2014	Hungry Ghost	"Saramona Said"	Dan Graetz		
2014	Hungry Ghost	"Fur Eyes"	Dan Graetz		
2014	Hungry Ghost	"Eightfold"	Timothy O'Keefe		
2015	WACO	"Like Soda"	Dan Graetz	ARIA Award for Best Video 2016 Nomination	
2016	WACO	"Viceroy"	Dan Graetz		
2016	WACO	"So Sentimental"	Marie Pangaud		
2016	WACO	"Blanket"	Matt Weston		
2016	WACO	"No Shade"	Dan Graetz		
2017	WACO	"How To Taste"	Timothy O'Keefe		
2019	Everything Is A-OK	"A-OK"	Luke Henery		
2019	Everything Is A-OK	"Vacation Forever"	Michael Ridley		
2020	Everything Is A-OK	"Lying on the Floor"	Michael Ridley		
2020	Everything Is A-OK	"Pick It Up Again"	Dan Graetz	ARIA Award for Best Video 2020 Nomination	
2020	Everything Is A-OK	"Slow Down Sonic"	Dan Graetz		
