= Triple J's Hottest 100 of 2013 =

Most popular songs of the year in Australia

2013 Triple J Hottest 100

Countdown details
- Date of countdown: 26 January 2014
- Votes cast: 1,490,000

Countdown highlights
- Winning song: Vance Joy "Riptide"
- Most entries: Daft Punk; Ezra Koenig (4 tracks)

Chronology
← Previous; 2013 (20 Years)	Next → 2014

The 2013 Triple J Hottest 100 was announced on 26 January 2014. It is the 21st countdown of the most popular songs of the year, as chosen by the listeners to Australian radio station Triple J. The countdown received 1.49 million votes.

Voting commenced on 20 December 2013, and closed on 20 January 2014.

== Full list ==
Note: Australian artists

#	Song	Artist	Country of origin
1	Riptide	Vance Joy	Australia
2	Royals	Lorde	New Zealand
3	Get Lucky	Daft Punk featuring Pharrell Williams and Nile Rodgers	France/United States
4	Do I Wanna Know?	Arctic Monkeys	United Kingdom
5	Drop the Game	Flume and Chet Faker	Australia
6	Why'd You Only Call Me When You're High?	Arctic Monkeys	United Kingdom
7	Young and Beautiful	Lana Del Rey	United States
8	Resolution	Matt Corby	Australia
9	Is This How You Feel?	The Preatures	Australia
10	Strong	London Grammar	United Kingdom
11	The Wire	Haim	United States
12	Tennis Court	Lorde	New Zealand
13	Retrograde	James Blake	United Kingdom
14	Covered in Chrome	Violent Soho	Australia
15	Team	Lorde	New Zealand
16	Reflektor	Arcade Fire	Canada
17	Lose Yourself to Dance	Daft Punk featuring Pharrell Williams	France/United States
18	Arabella	Arctic Monkeys	United Kingdom
19	Given the Chance	The Kite String Tangle	Australia
20	Black Skinhead	Kanye West	United States
21	Take Me	Rüfüs	Australia
22	Lanterns	Birds of Tokyo	Australia
23	When a Fire Starts to Burn	Disclosure	United Kingdom
24	Waiting All Night	Rudimental featuring Ella Eyre	United Kingdom
25	Your Body Is a Weapon	The Wombats	United Kingdom
26	Step	Vampire Weekend	United States
27	Falling	Haim	United States
28	Recover	Chvrches	United Kingdom
29	My Number	Foals	United Kingdom
30	Alive	Empire of the Sun	Australia
31	Diane Young	Vampire Weekend	United States
32	Smiles Don't Lie	Thundamentals	Australia
33	Ways to Go	Grouplove	United States
34	Desert Night	Rüfüs	Australia
35	Hey Now	London Grammar	United Kingdom
36	Ratchet	Bloc Party	United Kingdom
37	Gun	Chvrches	United Kingdom
38	Pizza Guy	Touch Sensitive	Australia
39	Get Lucky (Like a Version)	San Cisco	Australia
40	Born to Die	The Amity Affliction	Australia
41	Southern Sun	Boy & Bear	Australia
42	White Lies	Max Frost	United States
43	3005	Childish Gambino	United States
44	The Breach	Dustin Tebbutt	Australia
45	Global Concepts	Robert DeLong	United States
46	If I Had a Tail	Queens of the Stone Age	United States
47	Free	Rudimental featuring Emeli Sandé	United Kingdom
48	Stand Still	Flight Facilities featuring Micky Green	Australia
49	Doin' It Right	Daft Punk featuring Panda Bear	France/United States
50	Love Me Again	John Newman	United Kingdom
51	Eat, Sleep, Rave, Repeat	Fatboy Slim and Riva Starr featuring Beardyman	United Kingdom
52	Scar	Cloud Control	Australia
53	Ohio	Kingswood	Australia
54	Afterlife	Arcade Fire	Canada
55	Harlequin Dream	Boy & Bear	Australia
56	If I Could Change Your Mind	Haim	United States
57	Keep On Running	Andy Bull	Australia
58	Instant Crush	Daft Punk featuring Julian Casablancas	France/United States
59	Bound 2	Kanye West	United States
60	Lies	Chvrches	United Kingdom
61	Wasting My Young Years	London Grammar	United Kingdom
62	Embrace	Goldroom featuring Ariela Jacobs	United States/Australia
63	You & Me (Flume Remix)	Disclosure featuring Eliza Doolittle	United States/Australia
64	Graceless	The National	United States
65	Melt	Chet Faker featuring Kilo Kish	Australia/United States
66	Ausmusic Month Medley (Like a Version)	Illy	Australia
67	Act Your Age	Bliss N Eso	Australia
68	Sweet Nothing (Like a Version)	Something For Kate	Australia
69	White Noise	Disclosure featuring AlunaGeorge	United Kingdom
70	Australia Street	Sticky Fingers	Australia
71	Changing of the Seasons	Two Door Cinema Club	United Kingdom
72	I Sat by the Ocean	Queens of the Stone Age	United States
73	Thank You	Busta Rhymes featuring Q-Tip, Kanye West and Lil Wayne	United States
74	Jessica	Major Lazer featuring Ezra Koenig	United States
75	I Spy	Mikhael Paskalev	Norway
76	Listen to Soul, Listen to Blues	SAFIA	Australia
77	Youngbloods	Illy featuring Ahren Stringer	Australia
78	Fantasy	MS MR	United States
79	Fuckin' Problems	A$AP Rocky featuring 2 Chainz, Drake and Kendrick Lamar	United States/Canada
80	Always	Panama	Australia
81	Baby I Am Nobody Now	Andy Bull	Australia
82	Dojo Rising	Cloud Control	Australia
83	The End	The Jezabels	Australia
84	Summer Forgive Me	British India	Australia
85	Sangria	Remi	Australia
86	Sleepwalking	Bring Me the Horizon	United Kingdom
87	Only One	John Butler Trio	Australia
88	Leeward Side	Josh Pyke	Australia
89	Brighter Than Gold	The Cat Empire	Australia
90	Unbelievers	Vampire Weekend	United States
91	Tonight	Rüfüs	Australia
92	Shadow Moses	Bring Me the Horizon	United Kingdom
93	Elevate	St. Lucia	United States/South Africa
94	House of Dreams	Bliss N Eso	Australia
95	Play with Fire	Vance Joy	Australia
96	Luck Now	Big Scary	Australia
97	My God Is the Sun	Queens of the Stone Age	United States
98	Dead Star Shine	Horrorshow	Australia
99	Without You	Dillon Francis featuring Totally Enormous Extinct Dinosaurs	United States/United Kingdom
100	We Are	Karnivool	Australia

=== #101–#200 List ===
On 27 January 2014, Triple J broadcast the second 100 songs of the countdown.

#	Song	Artist	Country of origin
101	What Doesn't Kill You	Jake Bugg	United Kingdom
102	Youth	Daughter	United Kingdom
103	Hard out Here	Lily Allen	United Kingdom
104	Hearts Like Ours	The Naked & Famous	New Zealand
105	Oh Sailor	Mr Little Jeans featuring the Silverlake Conservatory of Music Youth Chorale	Norway/United States
106	Let Go	RAC featuring Kele and MNDR	United States/United Kingdom
107	When I Was Young	Blink-182	United States
108	Do or Die	Flux Pavilion featuring Childish Gambino	United Kingdom/United States
109	Miracle Mile	Cold War Kids	United States
110	Help Me Lose My Mind	Disclosure featuring London Grammar	United Kingdom
111	Borderlines and Aliens	Grouplove	United States
112	Promises	Cloud Control	Australia
113	Dip	Danny Brown	United States
114	Blood on the Leaves	Kanye West	United States
115	Can You Feel My Heart	Bring Me the Horizon	United Kingdom
116	Right Back at It Again	A Day to Remember	United States
117	On & On	Illy	Australia
118	One for the Road	Arctic Monkeys	United Kingdom
119	Pursuit	Gesaffelstein	France
120	I Didn't Believe	Flight Facilities featuring Elizabeth Rose	Australia
121	Stalking to a Stranger (Planets Collide Remix)	Hunters & Collectors	Australia
122	Steal the Light	The Cat Empire	Australia
123	Reservoir Dogs	Bliss n Eso featuring 360, Pez, Seth Sentry and Drapht	Australia
124	Cirrus	Bonobo	United Kingdom
125	So Good at Being in Trouble	Unknown Mortal Orchestra	New Zealand
126	The Woodpile	Frightened Rabbit	United Kingdom
127	Better Days	Edward Sharpe & the Magnetic Zeros	United States
128	Attracting Flies	AlunaGeorge	United Kingdom
129	Bassline Junkie	Dizzee Rascal	United Kingdom
130	I Am What You Want Me to Be	The Jungle Giants	Australia
131	Bridges	Broods	New Zealand
132	Come a Little Closer	Cage the Elephant	United States
133	Red Light, Green Light	Dune Rats	Australia
134	Everything You Wanted	Clubfeet	Australia
135	Home Is Where the Heart Is	Bliss N Eso	Australia
136	Around Here	Thelma Plum	Australia
137	In The Aisle	Violent Soho	Australia
138	Supersoaker	Kings of Leon	United States
139	Three Headed Women	Boy & Bear	Australia
140	Avant Gardener	Courtney Barnett	Australia
141	S.O.S.	Bluejuice	Australia
142	Holding On for Life	Broken Bells	United States
143	400 Lux	Lorde	New Zealand
144	Smoke Trails	Jackie Onassis	Australia
145	F for You	Disclosure	United Kingdom
146	Skin to Bone	The Jungle Giants	Australia
147	Kemosabe	Everything Everything	United Kingdom
148	Brontosaurus	Tkay Maidza featuring Bad Cop	Australia
149	Easy Easy	King Krule	United Kingdom
150	Every Lie	Meg Mac	Australia
151	Hands	Saskwatch	Australia
152	I Miss You	Ta-ku	Australia
153	Higher	Just Blaze and Baauer featuring Jay-Z	United States
154	Plastic Souvenirs	British India	Australia
155	Running to the Sea	Röyksopp featuring Susanne Sundfør	Norway
156	Need U (100%)	Duke Dumont featuring A*M*E	United Kingdom
157	Comfortable	The Aston Shuffle featuring Will Heard	Australia/England
158	Watch Out for This (Bumaye)	Major Lazer featuring Busy Signal, The Flexican and FS Green	United States/Jamaica/Netherlands
159	Pony (Like a Version)	Abbe May	Australia
160	Lodestar	Dead Letter Circus	Australia
161	Put Your Curse on Me	Stonefield	Australia
162	Giorgio by Moroder	Daft Punk	France
163	Byegone	Volcano Choir	United States
164	Wolf	Pyramid	France
165	Thirst	City and Colour	Canada
166	Entertainment	Phoenix	France
167	My Life	Bliss N Eso featuring Ceekay Jones	Australia/United States
168	Dream a Little Crazy	Architecture in Helsinki	Australia
169	Fall Underneath	Snakadaktal	Australia
170	I Need Answers	Asta	Australia
171	Quantum Flux	Northlane	Australia
172	Claude Monet	Allday	Australia
173	Where I Find You	Dustin Tebbutt	Australia
174	We Are the Same	Lurch & Chief	Australia
175	Psylla	Glass Animals	United Kingdom
176	Rock U Tonite	Wave Racer	Australia
177	Eidolon	Karnivool	Australia
178	One Way Trigger	The Strokes	United States
179	Cavalier	James Vincent McMorrow	Ireland
180	Ducks Fly Together	The Smith Street Band	Australia
181	The Good Life	Elizabeth Rose	Australia
182	Snap Out of It	Arctic Monkeys	United Kingdom
183	Bird Machine	DJ Snake featuring Alesia	France
184	Sundream	Rüfüs	Australia
185	Trying to Be Cool	Phoenix	France
186	Hung on Tight	Snakadaktal	Australia
187	Animals	Martin Garrix	Netherlands
188	Right Here	Rudimental featuring Foxes	United Kingdom
189	Love Illumination	Franz Ferdinand	United Kingdom
190	Demons	The National	United States
191	Unforgiven	Rüfüs	Australia
192	I Am	Dead Letter Circus	Australia
193	Tear It Down	The Aston Shuffle	Australia
194	No Waves	Fidlar	United States
195	I’ve Been Thinking	The Occupants	Australia
196	Let Her Go	Jagwar Ma	Australia
197	Under Your Skin	Dan Sultan	Australia
198	Love You Deserve	Stonefield	Australia
199	Buzzcut Season	Lorde	New Zealand
200	New Slaves	Kanye West	United States

== Statistics ==
=== Artists with multiple entries ===
#	Artist	Tracks
4	Daft Punk	3, 17, 49, 58
4	Ezra Koenig (Note: Three times with Vampire Weekend (26, 31, 90) and once with Major Lazer (74))	26, 31, 74, 90
3	Lorde	2, 12, 15
3	Arctic Monkeys	4, 6, 18
3	London Grammar	10, 35, 61
3	Haim	11, 27, 56
3	Kanye West (Note: Twice solo (20, 59) and once with Busta Rhymes (73))	20, 59, 73
3	RÜFÜS	21, 34, 91
3	Disclosure	23, 63, 69
3	Vampire Weekend	6, 31, 90
3	Chvrches	28, 37, 60
3	Queens of the Stone Age	46, 72, 97
2	Vance Joy	1, 95
2	Pharrell Williams (Note: Twice with Daft Punk (3, 17))	3, 17
2	Flume (Note: Once with Chet Faker (5) and one remix (63))	5, 63
2	Chet Faker (Note: Once with Flume (5) and once solo (65))	5, 65
2	Arcade Fire	16, 54
2	Ian Kenny (Note: Once with Birds of Tokyo (22), and once with Karnivool (100))	22, 100
2	Rudimental	24, 47
2	Ahren Stringer (Note: Once with The Amity Affliction (40), and once with Illy (77))	40, 77
2	Boy & Bear	41, 55
2	Cloud Control	52, 82
2	Andy Bull	57, 81
2	Illy	66, 77
2	Bliss n Eso	67, 94
2	Bring Me the Horizon	86, 92

=== Countries represented ===
Country	Total
Australia	45
United States	29
United Kingdom	23
New Zealand	3
Canada	3
Norway	1
South Africa	1

=== Records ===
- Vance Joy joins Denis Leary (1993), Alex Lloyd (2001) and Bernard Fanning (2005) as the only outright solo countdown winners.
  - Vance Joy is also the first Triple J Unearthed artist to place first in the Hottest 100. Beating the second place finishes by Killing Heidi (1999), Grinspoon (2002), Missy Higgins (2004), Art vs. Science (2009) and Little Red (2010).
- This is the first known instance where the total number of votes tallied was less than the previous year, tallying in at 1.49 million votes (2012 tallied over 1.5 million).
- Illy's "Ausmusic Month Medley" featured four songs that previously made it into the Hottest 100: "Tomorrow" by Silverchair (#5 in 1994), "The Nosebleed Section" by Hilltop Hoods (#9 in 2003), "My Happiness" by Powderfinger (#1 in 2000) and "On Top" by Flume (#67 in 2012). The song also featured numerous references from various other songs.
- This is the fifth consecutive countdown that Illy has appeared in, having first featured in the 2009 Hottest 100.
- The songs "Born to Die" by Lana Del Rey and "Sweet Nothing" by Calvin Harris featured in the countdown for the second year in a row after a covers by The Amity Affliction and Something for Kate featured at #40 and #68 respectively.
- Two versions of "Get Lucky" appeared in the countdown, the original by Daft Punk at number 3 and San Cisco's cover at number 39; this is the first time it has happened since 2004.
- St. Lucia is the first artist from South Africa to feature in the Hottest 100.
- Bliss n Eso's song "Act Your Age" (#67) samples Bluejuice's "Act Yr Age", which came in at #20 in 2011.

== Top 10 Albums of 2013 ==
A smaller poll of Triple J listeners' favorite albums of the year was held in December 2013.

Note: Australian artists

#	Artist	Album	Country of origin	Ranks in the Hottest 100
1	Arctic Monkeys	AM	United Kingdom	4, 6, 18 (40 in 2012)
2	Daft Punk	Random Access Memories	France	3, 17, 49, 58
3	Arcade Fire	Reflektor	Canada	16, 54
4	Vampire Weekend	Modern Vampires of the City	United States	26, 31, 90
5	Lorde	Pure Heroine	New Zealand	2, 12, 15
6	Haim	Days Are Gone	United States	11, 27, 56
7	Boy & Bear	Harlequin Dream	Australia	41, 55
8	Foals	Holy Fire	United Kingdom	29
9	The National	Trouble Will Find Me	United States	64
10	Kanye West	Yeezus	United States	20, 59

== CD release ==
Triple J's Hottest 100 Volume 21

Compilation album by Various Artists
- Released: 28 February 2014
- Length: 158:33
- Labels: ABC Music, Universal Music

The Triple J Hottest 100 CD for 2013 is the twenty first edition of the series. The double-CD was released on 28 February 2014.

CD 1
1. Vance Joy – "Riptide" (#1)
2. Lorde – "Royals" (#2)
3. Arctic Monkeys – "Do I Wanna Know?" (#4)
4. The Preatures – "Is This How You Feel?" (#9)
5. Disclosure – "When a Fire Starts to Burn" (#23)
6. Violent Soho – "Covered in Chrome" (#14)
7. Kanye West – "Black Skinhead" (#20)
8. The Wombats – "Your Body Is a Weapon" (#25)
9. James Blake – "Retrograde" (#13)
10. London Grammar – "Strong" (#10)
11. RÜFÜS – "Take Me" (#21)
12. Andy Bull – "Keep On Running" (#57)
13. Haim – "The Wire" (#11)
14. Foals – "My Number" (#29)
15. Queens of the Stone Age – "If I Had a Tail" (#46)
16. Flight Facilities featuring Micky Green – "Stand Still" (#48)
17. Illy featuring Ahren Stringer – "Youngbloods" (#77)
18. Cloud Control – "Scar" (#52)
19. Bloc Party – "Ratchet" (#36)
20. Grouplove – "Ways to Go" (#33)
21. Dustin Tebbutt – "The Breach" (#44)
CD 2
1. Daft Punk featuring Pharrell Williams & Nile Rodgers – "Get Lucky" (#3)
2. Max Frost – "White Lies" (#42)
3. Flume & Chet Faker – "Drop the Game" (#5)
4. Matt Corby – "Resolution" (#8)
5. Rudimental featuring Ella Eyre – "Waiting All Night" (#24)
6. Chvrches – "Recover" (#28)
7. Arcade Fire – "Reflektor" (#16)
8. Kingswood – "Ohio" (#53)
9. Bring Me the Horizon – "Sleepwalking" (#86)
10. The Kite String Tangle – "Given the Chance" (#19)
11. Thundamentals – "Smiles Don't Lie" (#32)
12. Vampire Weekend – "Step" (#26)
13. Birds of Tokyo – "Lanterns" (#22)
14. Goldroom – "Embrace" (#62)
15. Bliss n Eso – "Act Your Age" (#67)
16. Mikhael Paskalev – "I Spy" (#75)
17. Boy & Bear – "Southern Sun" (#41)
18. Lana Del Rey – "Young and Beautiful" (#7)
19. Touch Sensitive – "Pizza Guy" (#38)
20. Empire of the Sun – "Alive" (#30)

=== DVD Release ===
1. Vance Joy – "Riptide" (#1)
2. Lorde – "Royals" (#2)
3. Arctic Monkeys – "Do I Wanna Know?" (#4)
4. Lana Del Rey – "Young and Beautiful" (#7)
5. Flume & Chet Faker – "Drop the Game" (#5)
6. Matt Corby – "Resolution" (#8)
7. The Preatures – "Is This How You Feel?" (#9)
8. Haim – "The Wire" (#11)
9. London Grammar – "Strong" (#10)
10. James Blake – "Retrograde" (#13)
11. Kanye West – "Black Skinhead" (#20)
12. Violent Soho – "Covered in Chrome" (#14)
13. Arcade Fire – "Reflektor" (#16)
14. The Kite String Tangle – "Given the Chance" (#19)
15. RÜFÜS – "Take Me" (#21)
16. Birds of Tokyo – "Lanterns" (#22)
17. Disclosure – "When a Fire Starts to Burn" (#23)
18. Rudimental featuring Ella Eyre – "Waiting All Night" (#24)
19. The Wombats – "Your Body Is a Weapon" (#25)
20. Chvrches – "Recover" (#28)
21. Illy featuring Ahren Stringer – "Youngbloods" (#77)
22. Foals – "My Number" (#29)
23. Empire of the Sun – "Alive" (#30)
24. Vampire Weekend – "Diane Young" (#31)
25. Thundamentals – "Smiles Don't Lie" (#32)
26. Grouplove – "Ways to Go" (#33)
27. Bloc Party – "Ratchet" (#36)
28. Touch Sensitive – "Pizza Guy" (#38)
29. Boy & Bear – "Southern Sun" (#41)
30. Max Frost – "White Lies" (#42)
31. Childish Gambino – "3005" (#43)
32. Robert DeLong – "Global Concepts" (#45)
33. Flight Facilities featuring Micky Green – "Stand Still" (#48)
34. John Newman – "Love Me Again" (#50)
35. Fatboy Slim & Riva Starr featuring Beardyman – "Eat, Sleep, Rave, Repeat" (#51)
36. Cloud Control – "Scar" (#52)
37. Kingswood – "Ohio" (#53)
38. Andy Bull – "Keep On Running" (#57)
39. The National – "Graceless" (#64)
40. Bliss n Eso – "Act Your Age" (#67)
41. Sticky Fingers – "Australia Street" (#70)
42. Two Door Cinema Club – "Changing of the Seasons" (#71)
43. Queens of the Stone Age – "My God is the Sun" (#97)
44. Bring Me the Horizon – "Sleepwalking" (#86)
45. Busta Rhymes featuring Q-Tip, Kanye West and Lil Wayne – "Thank You" (#73)
46. Mikhael Paskalev – "I Spy" (#75)
47. SAFIA – "Listen to Soul, Listen to Blues" (#76)
48. Panama – "Always" (#80)
49. Dillon Francis featuring Totally Enormous Extinct Dinosaurs – "Without You" (#99)
50. The Jezabels – "The End" (#83)
