= AIR Awards of 2014 =

Annual Australian music awards ceremony

- Date: 8 October 2014
- Venue: The Meat Market, North Melbourne, Australia

Highlights
- Most wins: Courtney Barnett, Remi, Violent Soho (2)
- Most nominations: Violent Soho (4)
- Website: https://air.org.au/air-awards/

Television/radio coverage
- Runtime: Violent Soho (4)

The AIR Awards of 2014 (or Carlton Dry Independent Music Awards of 2014) is the ninth annual Australian Independent Record Labels Association Music Awards (generally known as the AIR Awards) and was an award ceremony at The Meat Market, North Melbourne on 8 October 2014. The event was sponsored by Australian liquor brand, Carlton Dry with Levi Jeans coming on board as a supporting partner in 2014.

== Performers ==
- Sheppard
- DMA's
- Safia
- Meg Mac

== Nominees and winners ==
=== AIR Awards ===
Winners are listed first and highlighted in boldface; other final nominees are listed alphabetically.

Best Independent Artist	Best Independent Album
**Courtney Barnett**; Chet Faker; John Butler Trio; Sia; Violent Soho	**Violent Soho – Hungry Ghost** (I Oh You); Chet Faker – Built on Glass (Future Classic); Rüfüs – Atlas (Sweat it Out); Sia – 1000 Forms of Fear (Monkey Puzzle); Total Control – Typical System (Independent)
Best Independent Single/EP	Breakthrough Independent Artist of the Year
**Courtney Barnett – "Avant Gardener"**; DMA's – DMA's; Sheppard – "Geronimo"; Sia – "Chandelier"; Violent Soho – "Covered in Chrome"	**Sheppard**; D.D Dumbo; DMA's; Meg Mac; Remi
Best Independent Blues and Roots Album	Best Independent Classical Album
**Dan Sultan – Blackbird**; John Butler Trio – Flesh & Blood; Little Bastard – Little Bastard; Mia Dyson – Idyllwild; Paul Kelly – The Merri Soul Sessions	**Gurrumul & Sydney Symphony Orchestra – His Life and Music**; Anna McMichael and Tamara-Anna Cislowska – Close Your Eyes and I'll Close Mine; Jane Sheldon & Nicole Panizza – Nature; Michael Kieran Harvey – Psychosonata; Tasmanian Symphony Orchestra – Hush Collection, Vol. 13: The Magic Island
Best Independent Country Album	Best Independent Dance/Electronica Album
**Halfway – Any Old Love**; Davidson Brothers – Wanderlust; Sara Storer – Lovegras; The Painted Ladies – Play Selections from 'The Loner'; The Perch Creek Family Jugband – Jumping on the Highwire	**Rüfüs - Atlas**; Andras Fox – Overworld; Chet Faker – Built on Glass; Guerre – Ex Nihilo; Ta-ku – Songs to Break Up to
Best Independent Dance/Electronica or Club Single	Best Independent Hard Rock or Punk Album
**Peking Duk featuring Nicole Millar – "High"**; Kilter – "They Say"; LUCIANBLOMKAMP – "Help Me Out"; Rüfüs – "Sundream"; Safia - "Paranoia, Ghosts & Other Sounds"	**Violent Soho – Hungry Ghost**; DZ Deathrays – Black Rat; High Tension – Death Beat; King Gizzard & the Lizard Wizard – Oddments; sleepmakeswaves – Love of Cartography
Best Independent Hip Hop/Urban Album	Best Independent Jazz Album
**Remi – Raw x Infinity**; Allday – Startup Cult; Horrorshow – King Amongst Many; L-FRESH the Lion – One; Thundamentals – So We Can Remember	**Paul Grabowsky Sextet – The Bitter Suite**; Andrea Keller Quartet with Strings – Wave Rider; Gian Slater – Still Still; Joseph Tawadros – Permission to Evaporate; Julien Wilson Quartet – This Is Always
Best Independent Label	Carlton Dry Global Music Grant
**I OH YOU**	**Remi**

== See also ==
- Music of Australia
