= Take Me =

Take Me may refer to:

- Take Me (TV series), a 2001 British drama miniseries
- Take Me (film), a 2017 American screwball comedy
- "Take Me" (Aly & AJ song), 2017
- "Take Me" (George Jones song), 1965
- "Take Me" (Korn song), 2016
- "Take Me" (Rüfüs song), 2013
- "Take Me" (Frank Sinatra song), 1942
- "Take Me" (Tiësto song), 2013
- ”Take Me” (Viktor Lazlo song), 1987
- "Take Me", a song on Kiss's 1976 album Rock and Roll Over
- "Take Me", a song on Grand Funk Railroad's 1976 album Born to Die
- "Take Me", a song on Gotthard's 1992 self-titled debut album
- "Take Me", a song on Lari White's 1998 album Stepping Stone
- "Take Me", a song on Papa Roach's 2004 album Getting Away with Murder
- "Take Me!", a song by The Wedding Present on their 1989 album Bizarro
- Take Me, a form of losing chess

== See also ==
- "Take On Me", a 1984 song by A-ha
- "It Takes Me", a 2021 song by Waylon Reavis and Boom Kitty
