= Maroochy Music And Visual Arts Festival =

Australian contemporary music festival

'The Maroochy Music and Visual Arts Festival (MMVAF) is an Australian contemporary music festival that was first held in 2015 on the site of the former Horton Park Golf Course in Maroochydore, Queensland. The festival was created and promoted by a home-grown team to bring up-and-coming contemporary Australian music to the area alongside visual art installations and displays.

== Artist lineups ==
=== 2015 ===
The 2015 lineup was announced on 25 May 2015 with a 'secret headliner' which was later revealed to be coast locals Flight Facilities.

==== Music ====
- Alpine
- DZ Deathrays
- Flight Facilities - 'Secret Headliner'
- Gang of Youths
- Harts (musician)
- Hermitude
- Hiatus Kaiyote
- The Kite String Tangle
- Marlon Williams and The Yarra Benders
- One Day
- WAAX

==== Visual Art ====
- Amanda Parer
- Bertie Blackman
- Cekios
- Conrad Square
- Fuzeillear
- Gerard King
- Gus
- Jay Beez
- Susan Bohmer
- Thom Stuart
- Wintercroft (UK)
- The Zookeeper

=== 2016 ===
The lineup for the 2016 event to be held 10 September 2016 has yet to be announced.
