= Concerto of the Greater Sea =

Studio album by Joseph Tawadros
- Released: 3 February 2012
- Length: 74:15
- Label: Joseph Tawadros, ABC Classics

Joseph Tawadros chronology
Band of Brothers (2011)	Concerto of the Greater Sea (2012)	Chameleons of the White Shadow (2013)

Concerto of the Greater Sea is a studio album by Australian, multi-instrumentalist and oud virtuoso Joseph Tawadros. The album was self-released in February 2012.

At the ARIA Music Awards of 2012, the album won the ARIA Award for Best World Music Album.

== Reception ==
The Australian said "The dynamic tonal range of Joseph Tawadros's oud, his dazzling technique and articulation are equally evident in both slow and fast sections. The ingenuity of brother James's work on req (Egyptian tambourine) peaks in 'The Procession'. Elsewhere, bendir (frame drum) provides propulsion. Oud, percussion and orchestra set a scorching tempo in Oasis."

== Track listing ==
1. "The Greater Sea" - 3:15
2. "Rose" - 4:02
3. "Twilight of Memory" - 5:28
4. "Epiphany" - 2:43
5. "Sleepless Mother" - 6:52
6. "Boundless" - 4:01
7. "Seafarer" - 5:40
8. "Oasis" - 6:02
9. "The Wind Prelude" - 0:33
10. "Heart of Rose" - 4:20
11. "The Procession" - 3:18
12. "Upon the Wind" - 7:55
13. "Ebb And Flow" - 2:20
14. "Remember" - 9:01
15. "Departure" - 3:10
16. "Existence" - 5:30

== Personnel ==
- Joseph Tawadros (Oud)
- Richard Tognetti & The Australian Chamber Orchestra (Violin)
- James Tawadros (Req', Bendir)
- Chris Moore (Viola)
- Matt McMahon (Piano)
