= Permission to Evaporate =

Studio album by Joseph Tawadros
- Released: 16 May 2014
- Recorded: February 2014
- Venue: New York
- Length: 79:15
- Label: Joseph Tawadros, ABC Classics

Joseph Tawadros chronology
Chameleons of the White Shadow (2013)	Permission to Evaporate (2014)	Truth Seekers Lovers and Warriors (2015)

Permission to Evaporate is a studio album by Australian, multi-instrumentalist and oud virtuoso Joseph Tawadros. The album was self-released in May 2014.

At the ARIA Music Awards of 2014, the album won the ARIA Award for Best World Music Album It was Tawadros third win in this category.

At the AIR Awards of 2014, the album was nominated for Best Independent Jazz Album Album.

== Reception ==
Peter Winkler from The Music Trust said "This album is a wondrous ride through Tawadros's vivid musical imagination, accompanied by some of the most outstanding players in the world"

== Track listing ==
1. "Bluegrass Nikriz" - 6:35
2. "Permission to Evaporate" - 5:36
3. "Sleight of Hand" - 5:16
4. "Space in Time" - 2:51
5. "Peace for My Father" - 5:49
6. "Constantinople" - 7:00
7. "Nomad's Fear" - 2:45
8. "Dreaming Hermit" - 6:17
9. "Last Candle" - 4:53
10. "Eye of the Beholder" - 5:13
11. "Wanderer" - 2:22
12. "Leunig at Midnight" - 4:04
13. "Kindred Spirits" - 6:23
14. "Point of Departure" - 4:28
15. "Shared Memories" - 4:07
16. "A Tear On Faewell" - 5:36
- All songs written and composed by Joseph Tawadros

== Personnel ==
- Joseph Tawadros (Oud)
- Christian McBride (Double Bass)
- Matt McMahon (Piano)
- Mike Stern (Electric Guitar)
- James Tawadros (Req & Bendir)
