= Live at the Sydney Opera House (Joseph Tawadros album) =

Live album by Joseph Tawadros
- Released: 9 July 2020
- Recorded: June 2019
- Venue: Sydney Opera House
- Label: ABC

Joseph Tawadros chronology
| Betrayal of a Sacred Sunflower (2019) | Live at the Sydney Opera House (2020) | Hope in an Empty City (2021) |

Live at the Sydney Opera House is a live album by Australian, multi-instrumentalist and oud virtuoso Joseph Tawadros with the Sydney Symphony Orchestra. The album was released in July 2020.

At the 2020 ARIA Music Awards, the album won the ARIA Award for Best World Music Album.

At the AIR Awards of 2021, the album won Best Independent Classical Album or EP.

== Reception ==
Angus McPherson from Limelight Magazine said "The multi-award winning Tawadros has made a career of blurring the boundaries between middle-eastern classical music, contemporary jazz and Western classical music, and is known for his easy-going stage presence and quick-witted banter – all of which he brought to the Opera House in spades in this concert with the Sydney Symphony Orchestra...". McPherson called it "A warm-hearted concert that was, quite simply, loads of fun".

== Track listing ==
1. "Movement 1" - 9:20
2. "Movement 2" - 8:21
3. "Movement 3" - 10:28
4. "We Are Memories" - 4:37
5. "Permission To Evaporate" - 6:26
6. "Work Is Love Made Visible" - 5:01
7. "Eye of the Beholder" - 4:41
8. "Constellation" - 4:21
9. "Riqq Taqasim" - 2:11
10. "Bluegrass Nikriz" - 6:55
11. "Point of Departure" - 8:05
12. "Constantinople" - 5:51

== Personnel ==
- Joseph Tawadros (Oud)
- James Tawadros (Riqq and Bendir)
- Benjamin Northey (Conductor)
- Sydney Symphony Orchestra
