= Son of Sam/Bombs Over Broadway =

Single by Violent Soho

from the album Violent Soho
- Released: 2010
- Recorded: 2009
- Genre: Rock
- Length: 6:15
- Label: Ecstatic Peace!
- Producer(s): Gil Norton

Violent Soho singles chronology
| "Muscle Junkie" (2010) | "Son of Sam/Bombs Over Broadway" (2010) | "Tinderbox/Neighbour Neighbour" (2012) |

Son of Sam/Bombs Over Broadway is a double-A sided single by Violent Soho. It was released as the third and final single from their second studio album, Violent Soho. Produced by Gil Norton and mixed by Rich Costey, it was released on 10 May 2010 on Thurston Moore's Ecstatic Peace! label.

== Reception ==
The Norman Records review called the single a "fiendish mixture of The Towers of London and The Offspring." Comparisons were made with Smashing Pumpkins, both favorable and unfavorable. Soundblab said that "their gloom laden guitars and wincing screeches - a la Smashing Pumpkins circa Mellon Collie - have been done better before." However, Uber Rock called Son of Sam "the sort of three-minute anthem Billy Corgan would once have written before he disappeared into the O in his Zero T shirt," and declared Bombs Over Broadway to be a "caustic mix of The Pixies, with its chugging verse, before breaking into the type of riotous chorus that fellow countrymen The Living End have made their trademark."

== Track listing ==
All music is composed by Violent Soho.

| No. | Title | Length |
|---|---|---|
| 1. | "Son of Sam" | 3:06 |
| 2. | "Bombs Over Broadway" | 3:09 |
| Total length: | | 6:15 |
