= Tinderbox/Neighbour Neighbour =

"Tinderbox"

Single by Violent Soho
- Released: 2012
- Recorded: 2012
- Genre: Rock
- Label: I OH YOU

Violent Soho singles chronology
"Son Of Sam/Bombs Over Broadway" (2010)	"Tinderbox" (2012)	"In the Aisle" (2013)

Tinderbox/Neighbour Neighbour is a double-A sided single by Australian band Violent Soho. The single was released on 16 November 2012 on the I OH YOU label.

== Reception ==
Dom Alessio, the host of Home and Hosed on ABC'S Triple J called Tinderbox, "a song as incendiary and flammable as the title."

== Track listing ==
All music is composed by Violent Soho

No.	Title	Length
1.	"Tinderbox"	3:54
2.	"Neighbour Neighbour"	3:33
Total length:		7:27
