= Chameleons of the White Shadow =

Studio album by Joseph Tawadros
- Released: 15 February 2013
- Recorded: February 2012
- Venue: Avatar Studios
- Length: 70:44
- Label: Joseph Tawadros, ABC Classics

Joseph Tawadros chronology
Concerto of the Greater Sea (2012)	Chameleons of the White Shadow (2013)	Permission to Evaporate (2014)

Chameleons of the White Shadow is a studio album by Australian, multi-instrumentalist and oud virtuoso Joseph Tawadros. The album was self-released in February 2013.

At the ARIA Music Awards of 2013, the album won the ARIA Award for Best World Music Album.

== Reception ==
Sydney Morning Herald said "With the inclusion of renowned banjo player Bela Fleck, the gifted Hammond organ playing of Joey DeFrancesco and Richard Bona’s bass – the result is a successful interplay, and often joyous push-pull between elements. Displaying his now-legendary skills as an oud player – diving in and out of heroic, Slash-like burning of the strings – the album creates racy, athletic soundscapes and romantic, mystic, spacious dells."

== Track listing ==
1. "White Shadow" - 5:58
2. "Gypo Blues" - 4:23
3. "Rose in the Sky" - 3:53
4. "Chameleon" - 5:47
5. "Hidden Voices" - 2:17
6. "Street in Sarajevo" - 4:02
7. "Freo" - 6:19
8. "Shelter" - 7:14
9. "Variations On a Dream" - 4:44
10. "Last Embrace" - 3:49
11. "Café Riche" - 8:19
12. "Tribal Bendir" - 4:19
13. "Time As Place" - 4:17
14. "Broken Promises" - 4:35

== Personnel ==
- Joseph Tawadros (Oud)
- Béla Fleck (Banjo),
- Richard Bona (Electric Bass)
- Joey DeFrancesco (Hammond Organ)
- James Tawadros (Req’ & Bendir)
- Roy Ayers (Vibraphone)
- Howard Johnson (Tuba)
- Jean-Louis Matinier (Accordion)
