= Hope in an Empty City =

Studio album by Joseph Tawadros
- Released: 9 July 2021
- Recorded: 29 June 2017 and 7 May 2021
- Studios: Avatar Studio, New York and London
- Length: 77:55
- Label: Joseph Tawadros
- Producer: Joseph Tawadros

Joseph Tawadros chronology
Live at the Sydney Opera House (2020)	Hope in an Empty City (2021)

Hope in an Empty City is a studio album by Australian, multi-instrumentalist and oud virtuoso Joseph Tawadros. The album was self-released in July 2021.

Joseph Tawadros said "Before COVID-19 hit, I ventured into a New York studio with four innovative musicians and we came up with some solid, quite surprising tracks – flavoured with Middle Eastern and jazz elements – and creating a lush, spacious organic sound, quite unlike my previous albums. The album is very eclectic, with fast-paced numbers, blues and jazz grooves, slow and meditative pieces and some of my more contemplative solo oud improvisation. It has been a real journey of emotions and genres as I wrote then played these new pieces with the band and I'm delighted with the result. It's an adventurous recording for me and I hope it will add a little something to the musical landscape."

At the 2021 ARIA Music Awards, the album won the ARIA Award for Best World Music Album.

At the AIR Awards of 2022, the album was nominated for Best Independent Jazz Album or EP.

== Track listing ==
1. "Smoke and Mirrors" - 5:56
2. "The Longer Road" - 5:17
3. "Everything Is You" - 4:43
4. "Abou Cromb (For John Abercrombie)" - 2:33
5. "Devil's Advocate" - 4:40
6. "Tit for Tat" - 1:59
7. "Von Brandy" - 3:25
8. "The Light of Your Being" - 4:31
9. "Your Memory Still Lingers" - 4:08
10. "An End Without Chance" - 5:36
11. "The Empty City" - 6:47
12. "Man Plans, God Laughs" - 4:47
13. "Happier Times" - 5:55
14. "My Wish for You" - 5:19
15. "Dance of the Quarter Tones" - 3:59
16. "Heart to Heart" - 3:59
17. "Ya Lel (At Night)" - 4:21
- All words and music composed by Joseph Tawadros.

== Personnel ==
- Joseph Tawadros (Oud)
- Layth Sidiq (Violin)
- Scott Colley (Double Bass)
- Dan Weiss (Drums)
- David "Fuze" Fiuczynski (Guitar)
