= Dustin Tebbutt =

Australian musician

- Born: Armidale, New South Wales, Australia
- Genres: Folk rock; Indietronica
- Occupation: Musician
- Instruments: Guitar; vocals
- Years active: 2013–present
- Labels: Narvik Records; Eleven: A Music Company
- Website: dustintebbutt.com

Dustin Tebbutt is an Australian musician from Armidale, New South Wales. He began recording music in 2013 and released his debut EP, titled The Breach, the same year. He has since released four additional EPs and one full-length album, First Light, in 2016.

== Biography ==
Tebbutt released his first single, "The Breach", in 2013, and it reached #76 on the ARIA singles chart and was #44 in the 2013 Triple J Hottest 100. His EP Home and debut album First Light reached #34 and #13 respectively on the ARIA albums chart. He was nominated for the 2014 ARIA Music Award for Engineer of the Year for his EP Bones. In 2018, Tebbutt collaborated with Australian electronic duo Flight Facilities on the song "All Your Love", which later appeared on his EP Chasing Gold.

In 2019, Tebbutt launched a new collaborative project called OK Moon, which he said he had been working on for a few years. Other members of the "supergroup" include LANKS, Xavier Dunn, and Hayden Calnin. They released their first single, "Loved You Right", in March 2019, and their debut self-titled album came out in August of the same year.

== Discography ==
=== Albums ===
Title	Details	Peak chart positions
Title	Details	AUS
First Light	Release date: 5 August 2016; Label: Narvik Records, Eleven: A Music Company (ELEVENCD131); Formats: CD, digital download, vinyl, streaming	13
OK Moon	Release date: 23 August 2019; Label: OK Moon; Formats: digital download, streaming	—
A Bend in the Light	Release date: 3 October 2025; Label: Independent; Formats: Digital download, streaming	
"—" denotes a recording that did not chart

=== EPs ===
Title	Details	Peak chart positions
Title	Details	AUS
The Breach	Release date: 18 October 2013; Label: Narvik, Eleven: A Music Company (ELEVENCD113); Formats: CD, 10" LP, digital download	—
Bones	Release date: 2 May 2014; Label: Narvik, Eleven: A Music Company (ELEVENCD116); Formats: CD, 10" LP, digital download	—
Home	Release date: 18 September 2015; Label: Narvik, Eleven (ELEVENCD125); Formats: CD, digital download, streaming	34
Give Me Tonight	Release date: 21 October 2016; Label: Narvik, Eleven (ELEVENCD125); Formats: CD, digital download, streaming	—
Chasing Gold	Release date: 26 October 2018; Label: Narvik, Eleven (1435289830); Formats: digital download, streaming	—
Last Line	Release date: 16 October 2020; Label: Dustin Tebbutt; Formats: digital download, streaming	—
Changeophelia	Release date: 20 January 2023; Label: Dustin Tebbutt; Formats: digital download, streaming	—
The Breach, A Vast Decade (10 Year Anniversary)	Release date: 16 June 2023; Label: Dustin Tebbutt; Formats: digital download, streaming	—
"—" denotes a recording that did not chart

=== Singles ===
As lead artist

Title	Year	Peak chart positions	Certifications	Album
Title	Year	AUS	Certifications	Album
"The Breach"	2013	76		The Breach
"Bones"	2014	90		Bones
"Illuminate" (with the Kite String Tangle)	2015	—		Non-album single
"Home"	2015	—		Home
"First Light"	2016	—		First Light
"Give Me Tonight"	2016	—		First Light
"Atlas in Your Eye"	2017	—		Jasper Jones: Music from the Motion Picture
"Love is Blind"	2018	—		Chasing Gold
"All Your Love"	2018	—		Chasing Gold
"Satellite"	2018	—		Chasing Gold
"Resin"	2020	—	ARIA: Gold	Last Line
"—" denotes a recording that did not chart

As featured artist

Title	Year	Album
"All Your Love" (Flight Facilities featuring Dustin Tebbutt)	2018	Non-album single
