= My Pal/Task Force =

Single by Violent Soho
- Released: 2009
- Recorded: 2009
- Genre: Rock
- Label: Ecstatic Peace!

Violent Soho singles chronology
"My Pal/Task Force" (2009)	"Jesus Stole My Girlfriend" (2010)

My Pal/Task Force is a double-A sided single released by Violent Soho in 2009 on the Ecstatic Peace! label. The first track is a cover of Melbourne-based band God's 1988 single "My Pal". Darren Levin of Mess+Noise says that "the band stay remarkably true to the song’s acne-riddled genesis/genius." The second track is Violent Soho's cover of the 1978 song, Task Force, from Brisbane's Razar, which Levin described as "irreverent and off-the-cuff... like Rancid covering the Ramones."

== Track listing ==
No.	Title	Writer(s)	Original performer	Length
1.	"My Pal"	Joel Silbersher	God	3:02
2.	"Task Force"	Razar	Razar	2:11
Total length:				5:13
