= Pigs & T.V. =

EP by Violent Soho
- Released: 2006
- Recorded: Zero Interference Studios, Brisbane
- Genre: Rock
- Length: 23:24
- Producer: Bryce Moorhead

Violent Soho chronology
Pigs & T.V. (2006)	We Don't Belong Here (2008)

Professional ratings
Review scores
Source	Rating
Blunt Magazine	June 2006

Pigs & T.V. is Violent Soho's debut extended play, released in 2006. Blunt Magazine gave it 8/10, saying "Sounding like The Vines fed on raw meat and produced on a fraction of the budget, Violent Soho are a boisterous pop rock combo from Brissyland reviving the spirit of the grunge era."

== Track listing ==
All music is composed by Violent Soho

No.	Title	Length
1.	"Generation"	3:13
2.	"Hollywood"	3:29
3.	"Revolutionary"	4:07
4.	"Black City"	5:01
5.	"Bombs Over Broadway"	3:32
6.	"On & On"	4:02
Total length:		23:24
