= Jesus Stole My Girlfriend =

Single by Violent Soho

from the album Violent Soho
- B-side: "Eat Your Parents"
- Released: 1 January 2010
- Length: 2:57
- Label: Ecstatic Peace!
- Songwriter(s): Luke Boerdam, Michael Richards, James Tidswell, Luke Henery
- Producer(s): Gil Norton

Violent Soho singles chronology
"My Pal/Task Force" (2009)	"Jesus Stole My Girlfriend" (2010)	"Muscle Junkie" (2010)

"Jesus Stole My Girlfriend" is a song by the Australian rock band Violent Soho. It was the first single from their self-titled debut, and is arguably the most well known song by the band. The song is originally found on the album We Don't Belong Here, but was re-recorded (along with much of the material from the album) for their self-titled record. Interviews with the band (as well as lyrics) suggest that the song is about one of the band members' girlfriends leaving them for the devotion of Christianity.

== Track listing ==
Side A
No.	Title	Length
1.	"Jesus Stole My Girlfriend"	2:57

Side B
No.	Title	Length
1.	"Eat Your Parents"	3:03

== Music videos ==
There are two official music videos for 'Jesus Stole My Girlfriend'. The first of the two depicts the band playing in what appears to be a garage or basement, in very cold weather.

A second video was shot outside of Mann's Chinese Theater in Los Angeles, California, all in one constant three-minute shot. Many pedestrians and movie goers in the area are filmed, including one couple that are both dressed up as Superman. Some shots include members of the band playing their instruments on the sidewalk outside of the theater.

== Charts ==
Chart (2010)	Peak position
Billboard Alternative Songs	21
Billboard Rock Songs	35
