= Davidson Brothers =

Australian music duo

- Origin: Yinnar, Victoria, Australia
- Genres: Bluegrass, country
- Years active: 1998–present
- Label: Independent
- Members: Hamish Davidson; Lachlan Davidson
- Website: davidsonbrothersband.com

The Davidson Brothers are an Australian bluegrass and country music duo. Originally from Yinnar, Victoria, the brothers are Hamish and Lachlan Davidson. They have written and performed together since their youth, and "are multi-instrumentalists on banjo, fiddle, and mandolin and have won many awards on the country circuit". They released their first album, Blue Spruce, in 1999 when they were both in their early teens. This was the beginning of what would span into numerous recordings and national awards. "With their dynamic brand of classic bluegrass and more contemporary newgrass music, the pair has not only blitzed the Australian country music industry, but has attracted plenty of attention in the United States and Europe as well."

While they have toured extensively as the Davidson Brothers, they have also shared the stage with many well-known Australian artists including Andrew Farriss, Lee Kernaghan, Troy Cassar-Daley, Beccy Cole, Melinda Schneider, Sara Storer, Joy McKean, Anne Kirkpatrick and Hugh McDonald. They have entertained troops in the Middle East, made regular appearances on national television (Hey Hey It's Saturday, Good Morning Australia, The Panel, Spicks and Specks) and played on many recording sessions with a range of other artists (Smoky Dawson, Kevin Bloody Wilson, Joe Camilleri, Bruce Rowland).

Since completing university the Davidson Brothers have made Bendigo, Victoria, their home and split their time between music and their other interests. They were among the Top 10 Most Outstanding Musicians in the 2010 Melbourne Prize. In 2011, the brothers established the Australian Youth Bluegrass Scholarship to encourage and nurture singers and musicians who demonstrate exceptional talent and dedication in the field of Bluegrass Music.

== History ==
=== 1999: Blue Spruce ===
Hamish and Lachlan recorded Blue Spruce with Andrew Clermont in 1998 at the Davidson family home in Yinnar Victoria. This album only has one vocal track, "Lonesome Road Blues". The album also features their younger sister Ailsa on a couple of tracks.

=== 2003: Stay All Night ===
Stay All Night was recorded in 2003 across two cities. The eight Bluegrass music tracks were recorded at Allan Eaton Studios in St Kilda, Victoria. The studio was familiar to the boys as they had previously played on The Man from Snowy River: Arena Spectacular soundtrack at this studio. Five Country music and Western swing tracks were recorded at Swinging Doors Studios in Kareela, New South Wales. Laurie Grundy and Josh Grundy, members of their live band at the time, played on all of the tracks.

=== 2004: Where I Want To Be ===
Where I Want To Be is a three track EP, recorded in 2004 by Hugh McDonald (formerly of the Australian group Redgum) in Melbourne, Australia. The tracks are all original and feature Melbourne musicians Gerry Pantazis on drums and James Clark on bass. The brothers went on to film a live music video for "Where I Want To Be" at the 2004 Deniliquin Ute Muster. The song was renamed "Where I Wanna Be" and rerecorded in 2006 on the Davidson Brothers' Raised on the Road album.

=== 2006: Raised on the Road ===
This is the first album the Davidson Brothers recorded overseas. It was produced by Mark Thornton (Jerry Reed band) in Nashville, Tennessee. Musicians appearing on the album are Bryan Sutton (guitar), Randy Kohrs (dobro) and Dennis Crouch (bass). There is also a guest vocal by Travis List of South Australia.

=== 2007: Davidson Brothers ===
The Davidson Brothers recorded this self-titled album in Madison, Tennessee, in September 2007. This was the second album produced by Mark Thornton. This album has lots of variety, from traditional bluegrass to country to intense gypsy swing. Guest musicians appearing on the album are Bryan Sutton (guitar), Rob Ickes (dobro), Dennis Crouch (bass), and a guest vocal by one of the pioneers of Australian bluegrass, Trev Warner, as well as vocal harmonies from Larry Marrs and Cia Cherryholmes. "Left Hand Drive" won the 2009 Golden Guitar (Country Music Awards of Australia) for Best Instrumental.

=== 2009: Born to Play ===
The third album to be produced by Mark Thornton, 'Born to Play' was again recorded in Madison, Tennessee. However, this time around, Hamish and Lachlan set out to showcase their ability to slip comfortably in and out of different musical genres, including bluegrass, country, gypsy, swing and Celtic music. Guest musicians appearing on the album are Bryan Sutton, Randy Kohrs, Kevin Grant, Kenny Malone, The Cherryholmes family, Pat Bergeson, Jeff Taylor, Larry Marrs and Jerry Salley.

=== 2011: Here to Stay ===
Here To Stay was recorded in Nashville in April 2011 and release on 1 July 2011, Here To Stay is the sixth studio album released by the Davidson Brothers, with producing duties shared between Mark Thornton and Larry Marrs. There are eleven original tracks, ten of them written by Hamish and Lachlan.

=== 2014: Wanderlust ===
Recorded in Melbourne in March 2014 and released on 20 June 2014, Wanderlust is the seventh studio album released by the Davidson Brothers, this time self-produced. There are eleven original tracks, all of which are written by Hamish and Lachlan.

=== 2017: All You Need is Music ===
Recorded in Nashville in December 2016 and released on 7 April 2017, All You Need is Music is the eighth studio album released by the Davidson Brothers, produced by Mark Thornton and Larry Marrs. There are thirteen tracks, twelve of which are written by Hamish and Lachlan.

== Discography ==
=== Albums ===
List of albums, with selected details
Title	Details
Blue Spruce	Released: 1998; Label: Hamish and Lachlan Davidson (HLCD001); Format: CD
Stay All Night	Released: 2003; Label: Hamish and Lachlan Davidson (HLCD002); Format: CD, digital download
Raised on the Road	Released: 2006; Label: Davidson Brothers; Format: CD, digital download
Davidson Brothers	Released: 2007; Label: Davidson Brothers; Format: CD, digital download
Born to Play	Released: August 2009; Label: Davidson Brothers; Format: CD, digital download
Here To Stay	Released: July 2011; Label: Davidson Brothers; Format: CD, digital download
Wanderlust	Released: June 2014; Label: Davidson Brothers; Format: CD, digital download
All You Need is Music	Released: September 2017; Label: Davidson Brothers; Format: CD, digital download

=== Extended plays ===
List of EPs, with selected details
Title	Details
Where I Want to Be	Released: 2004; Label: Davidson Brothers; Format: CD, digital download

== Awards and nominations ==
=== AIR Awards ===
The Australian Independent Record Awards (commonly known informally as AIR Awards) is an annual awards night to recognise, promote and celebrate the success of Australia's Independent Music sector.

Year	Nominee / work	Award	Result
2011	Here to Stay	Best Independent Country Album	Nominated
2014	Wanderlust	Best Independent Country Album	Nominated

=== Country Music Awards of Australia ===
The Country Music Awards of Australia (CMAA) (also known as the Golden Guitar Awards) is an annual awards night held in January during the Tamworth Country Music Festival, celebrating recording excellence in the Australian country music industry. They have been held annually since 1973.

Year	Nominee / work	Award	Result (wins only)
2009	Left Hand Drive	Instrumental	Won
2010	Fox on the Freeway	Instrumental	Won
2012	OMFG	Instrumental	Won
2018	Back Where I Started	Bluegrass	Won
2018	Evelyn's Kitchen	Instrumental	Won

=== Australian Bluegrass Championships ===
The Australian Bluegrass Championships, take place in Tamworth, NSW

Year	Nominee / work	Award	Result
2000	Hamish Davidson	Fiddle Champion	Won
2008	Lachlan Davidson	Mandolin Champion	Won
2008	Hamish Davidson	Horizon Award – Best Overall	Won
2009	Hamish Davidson	Banjo Champion	Won
2009	Lachlan Davidson	Mandolin Champion	Won
2010	Lachlan Davidson	Mandolin Champion	Won
