= Covered in Chrome =

Single by Violent Soho

from the album Hungry Ghost
- Released: 6 September 2013
- Length: 3:33
- Label: I Oh You (AUS); SideOneDummy (US)
- Songwriter: Violent Soho
- Producer: Bryce Moorhead

Violent Soho singles chronology
"In the Aisle" (2013)	"Covered in Chrome" (2013)	"Saramona Said" (2014)

"Covered in Chrome" is a song by Australian rock band Violent Soho. It is released as the second single from their third studio album, Hungry Ghost (2013).

== Music video ==
A video for the song "Covered in Chrome", filmed in band bassist Luke Henery's house, was released on 16 October 2013. It concludes with a person setting fire to items on a clothesline in the backyard. In response to a question about concerns regarding the potential for damage to Henery's residence, caused by the music video concept, Boerdam stated: "... it was his [Henery's] problem … It’s a rental, so we just said 'Do you have a lease? Yeah, cool, let’s do it'". Ideas and imagery in the lyrics for the song were informed by a Wikipedia article about the Hungarian uprising in 1956 which Boerdam had been reading.

== Cover version ==
As part of the triple J radio station's segment "Like a Version", the band Northeast Party House performed a live-to-air cover version of "Covered in Chrome" on 15 July 2014. The version incorporated an electro influence as well as a Lorde reference.

== Perspectives ==
Tidswell appeared in a short documentary film directed by Dan Graetz, who directed the "Covered in Chrome" music video, in which he spoke about the business of music from an artist's perspective. Sponsored by the Jack Daniel's alcohol manufacturer, Graetz filmed Tidswell alongside other musicians such as Kate Miller-Heidke to gain insight into the state of the Australian music industry and published the documentary—called "The Truth About Money in Music" and just under ten minutes in length—on 20 July 2014. Tidswell spoke about the concept of "selling out" as part of his contribution:

People, you know, they put the big deal on, you know, "selling out" and that sort of thing, and, in all honesty, there is not much difference between taking money from, you know, some brand and some record label. I mean, it's pretty similar stuff. In some ways, it's better to take it from the brand because you don't have to pay the money back.

== Reception ==
"Covered in Chrome" was voted into the fourteenth position on the Triple J Hottest 100, 2013. The band stated in an early January 2014 interview that they were not confident of ranking in the top 20 for the poll. However, the Triple J Hottest 100 of the 2010s saw "Covered in Chrome" improve its ranking to place fourth for the decade.

4ZZZ said, "The second release from local grunge gods, [it] lulls you into a false sense of security, readying the listener for a ballad, before combusting into a wall of "yeahs", crashing drums and heavy guitars."

== Awards and nominations ==
"Covered in Chrome" was nominated for Best Independent Single or EP at the AIR Awards of 2014, shortlisted for the 2014 APRA Awards for Song of the Year, and nominated for Best Video at the ARIA Music Awards of 2014.

In 2025, the song was ranked 40th in Triple J Hottest 100 of Australian Songs.

== Charts ==
Chart performance for "Covered in Chrome"
Chart (2014)	Peak position
Australia (ARIA)	80

== Certifications ==
Certifications for "Covered in Chrome"
Region	Certification	Certified units/sales
Australia (ARIA)	Platinum	70,000^{‡}
^{‡} Sales+streaming figures based on certification alone.
