= Atlas (Rüfüs album) =

Studio album by Rüfüs
- Released: 9 August 2013
- Recorded: 2012–2013
- Genres: Alternative dance; experimental pop; electronic dance
- Length: 48:28
- Label: Sweat It Out

Rüfüs chronology
| Rüfüs (Blue) (2012) | Atlas (2013) | Bloom (2016) |

Singles from Atlas
- 1. "Take Me" Released: 8 March 2013; 2. "Desert Night" Released: 21 June 2013; 3. "Tonight" Released: 22 November 2013; 4. "Sundream" Released: 21 March 2014

Professional ratings
Review scores
| Source | Rating |
|---|---|
| AllMusic | 4/5 stars |
| musicOMH | 4/5 stars |
| Renowned for Sound | 4.5/5 stars |

Atlas is the debut album of the alternative dance group Rüfüs, released in Australia under Sweat It Out on 9 August 2013. The album debuted at number 1 on the ARIA Albums Chart on 25 August 2013.

At the J Awards of 2013, the album was nominated for Australian Album of the Year.

== Singles ==
The album was preceded by "Take Me" as the lead single on 8 March 2013 and "Desert Night" as the second single on 21 June 2013. "Tonight" was released as the third single on 22 November 2013, followed by "Sundream" as the fourth and final single on 21 March 2014.

== Track listing ==
All music is composed by RÜFÜS DU SOL.

Atlas – Standard edition / Light/Dark deluxe edition – Disc 1 – Light
| No. | Title | Length |
|---|---|---|
| 1. | "Sundream" | 4:35 |
| 2. | "Take Me" | 4:02 |
| 3. | "Tonight" | 3:46 |
| 4. | "Modest Life" | 3:42 |
| 5. | "Rendezvous" | 4:20 |
| 6. | "Desert Night" | 5:25 |
| 7. | "Simplicity Is Bliss" | 3:10 |
| 8. | "Sarah" | 4:07 |
| 9. | "Unforgiven" | 4:29 |
| 10. | "Two Clocks" | 3:48 |
| 11. | "Imaginary Air" | 7:04 |

Atlas – Non-Australian bonus track
| No. | Title | Length |
|---|---|---|
| 12. | "We Left" (Night Version) | 5:13 |

Atlas – Light/Dark deluxe edition – Disc 2 – Dark
| No. | Title | Length |
|---|---|---|
| 1. | "Sundream" (Classixx remix) | 5:19 |
| 2. | "Take Me" (Miguel Campbell remix) | 4:47 |
| 3. | "Tonight" (Rampue remix) | 8:22 |
| 4. | "Desert Night" (Jesse Rose remix) | 6:21 |
| 5. | "Unforgiven" (the Presets remix) | 4:42 |
| 6. | "Sarah" (Touch Sensitive remix) | 4:54 |
| 7. | "We Left" (Night Version) | 5:13 |
| 8. | "Paris Collides" (Night Version) | 4:04 |
| 9. | "Talk to Me" (Night Version) | 4:56 |
| 10. | "Take Me" (Chloe Martini remix) (bonus track) | 4:23 |
| 11. | "Sundream" (Hayden James remix) (bonus track) | 3:44 |
| 12. | "Desert Night" (Motez remix) (bonus track) | 5:19 |

== Personnel ==
=== Musicians ===
Rüfüs

- Tyrone Lindqvist – vocals, guitar
- Jon George – keyboards
- James Hunt – drums

Other musicians

- Jess Pollard – vocals (9)

=== Technical ===
- Darren Ziesing – mastering
- Cassian Stewart-Kasimba – mixing (6)

=== Artwork ===
- Nick George – cover artwork

== Charts ==
=== Weekly charts ===
| Chart (2013/14) | Peak position |
|---|---|
| Australian Albums (ARIA) | 1 |

=== Year-end charts ===
| Chart (2013) | Position |
|---|---|
| Australian Albums (ARIA) | 95 |
| Australian Dance Albums (ARIA) | 12 |
| Chart (2014) | Position |
| Australian Albums (ARIA) | 58 |
| Australian Dance Albums (ARIA) | 6 |
| Chart (2015) | Position |
| Australian Dance Albums (ARIA) | 29 |
| Chart (2016) | Position |
| Australian Dance Albums (ARIA) | 24 |
| Chart (2018) | Position |
| Australian Dance Albums (ARIA) | 50 |
| Chart (2019) | Position |
| Australian Dance Albums (ARIA) | 30 |
| Chart (2020) | Position |
| Australian Dance Albums (ARIA) | 22 |
| Chart (2021) | Position |
| Australian Dance Albums (ARIA) | 26 |
| Chart (2022) | Position |
| Australian Dance Albums (ARIA) | 32 |
| Chart (2023) | Position |
| Australian Dance Albums (ARIA) | 31 |
| Chart (2024) | Position |
| Australian Dance Albums (ARIA) | 30 |

== Certifications ==
| Region | Certification | Certified units/sales |
|---|---|---|
| Australia (ARIA) | Platinum | 70,000^{^} |
^{^} Shipments figures based on certification alone.

== Release history ==
| Region | Date | Format(s) | Label | Catalogue |
|---|---|---|---|---|
| Australia | 9 August 2013 | CD; digital download | Sweat It Out | SWEATA004 |
| United Kingdom | 28 April 2014 | CD; digital download | Sweat It Out; Columbia | 88843046402 |
| United States | 25 August 2014 | Digital download | Sweat It Out | B00LW95JCW |
| Australia | 2018 | 2xVinyl | Sweat It Out | SWEATA018V |
