= Violent Soho (album) =

Studio album by Violent Soho
- Released: 9 March 2010
- Recorded: Ecstatic Peace/Universal Records
- Genres: Alternative rock, grunge
- Length: 31:22
- Label: Ecstatic Peace
- Producer: Gil Norton

Violent Soho chronology
We Don't Belong Here (2008)	Violent Soho (2010)	Hungry Ghost (2013)

Singles from Violent Soho
- 1. "Jesus Stole My Girlfriend" Released: January 2010; 2. "Muscle Junkie" Released: 2010; 3. "Son Of Sam/Bombs Over Broadway" Released: 10 May 2010

Professional ratings
Review scores
Source	Rating
Absolutepunk.net	72% link
Allmusic	link
Alter The Press!	link
Drowned In Sound	6/10 link
The Guardian	link
Rock Sound	8/10 link
Sputnikmusic	link

Violent Soho is the second official studio album of Violent Soho, released on 9 March 2010 on the Ecstatic Peace label. The album contains much of the material off of their first album, We Don't Belong Here, though it has been re-recorded with changes made to some of the songs. Although the album is not technically their first record, it is commonly referred to as their "debut album".

== Track listing ==
All music is composed by Violent Soho (Luke Boerdam, James Tidswell, Luke Henery and Michael Richards, except where noted).

No.	Title	Writer(s)	Length
1.	"Here Be Dragons"		3:15
2.	"Jesus Stole My Girlfriend"		2:57
3.	"Son Of Sam"		3:00
4.	"My Generation"		3:02
5.	"Muscle Junkie"		3:16
6.	"Outsider"	Boerdam	3:00
7.	"Slippery Tongue"		3:02
8.	"Love Is A Heavy Word"		3:05
9.	"Bombs Over Broadway"		3:09
10.	"Narrow Ways"		3:36
Total length:			31:22

Australian Edition Bonus Tracks
No.	Title	Writer(s)	Length
11.	"Paper Plane"	Boerdam	3:02
12.	"Eat Your Parents"		3:03
Total length:			37:27

== Personnel ==
Violent Soho

- Luke Boerdam - lead vocals, rhythm guitars
- James Tidswell - lead guitars
- Luke Henery - bass guitars, backing vocals
- Michael Richards - drums, percussion

== ARIA Awards ==
Year	Nominee / work	Award	Result
2010	Violent Soho	Best Hard Rock/Heavy Metal Album	Nominated
