= Desert Night =

Single by Rüfüs

from the album Atlas
- Released: 21 June 2013
- Length: 4:35
- Label: Sweat It Out
- Songwriter(s): Jon George; Tyrone Lindqvist; James Hunt
- Producer(s): Jon George; Tyrone Lindqvist; James Hunt

Rüfüs singles chronology
"Take Me" (2013)	"Desert Night" (2013)	"Tonight" (2013)

"Desert Night" is a song by Australian alternative dance group Rüfüs. The song was released on 21 June 2013 as the second single from the group's debut studio album, Atlas (2013). The song peaked at number 67 in June 2013.

== Reception ==
Your EDM said "Desert Nights" "...layers wistful vocals over a combination of supple pads, horns, and percussive instruments to create an emotional blend of genres." Ivan Zuniga from Ear Milk said "The original mix of "Desert Night" has a smooth danceable beat mixed with a catchy indie tempo that flows well with the soft vocals."

== Music video ==
The music video was directed by Katzki and released on 20 June 2013.

== Track listing ==
Digital single
No.	Title	Length
1.	"Desert Night" (radio edit)	4:35

Remixes
No.	Title	Length
1.	"Desert Night" (album version)	5:25
2.	"Desert Night" (Jesse Rose remix)	6:21
3.	"Desert Night" (Motez (producer) remix)	5:19
4.	"Desert Night" (Victor Lassance remix)	6:12
5.	"Desert Night" (James Curd remix)	5:02
6.	"Desert Night" (Avon Stringer remix)	6:49

American single
No.	Title	Length
1.	"Desert Night" (album version)	5:25
2.	"Modest Life"	3:42
3.	"Desert Night" (Kastle remix)	4:28
4.	"Desert Night" (Groundislava remix)	4:54

United Kingdom single
No.	Title	Length
1.	"Desert Night" (Jesse Rose remix)	6:21
2.	"Desert Night" (Motez (producer) remix)	5:19
3.	"Desert Night" (Victor Lassance remix)	6:12
4.	"Desert Night" (James Curd remix)	5:02
5.	"Desert Night" (Avon Stringer remix)	6:50

== Charts ==
Chart (2013)	Peak position
Australia (ARIA Chart)	67
Australian Independent (AIR)	4

== Certifications ==
Region	Certification	Certified units/sales
Australia (ARIA)	Platinum	70,000^{‡}
^{‡} Sales+streaming figures based on certification alone.

== Release history ==
Release history for "Desert Night"
Country	Version	Date	Format	Label	Catalogue
Australia	Radio edit	21 June 2013	Digital download	Sweat It Out	SWEATDS084
Australia	Remixes	5 July 2013	Digital download	Sweat It Out	SWEATDS095
United States	Digital single	28 January 2014	Digital download	Sweat It Out / Sony Music	
United Kingdom	Digital single	23 February 2014	Digital download	Sweat It Out / Sony	
