= Joseph Tawadros =

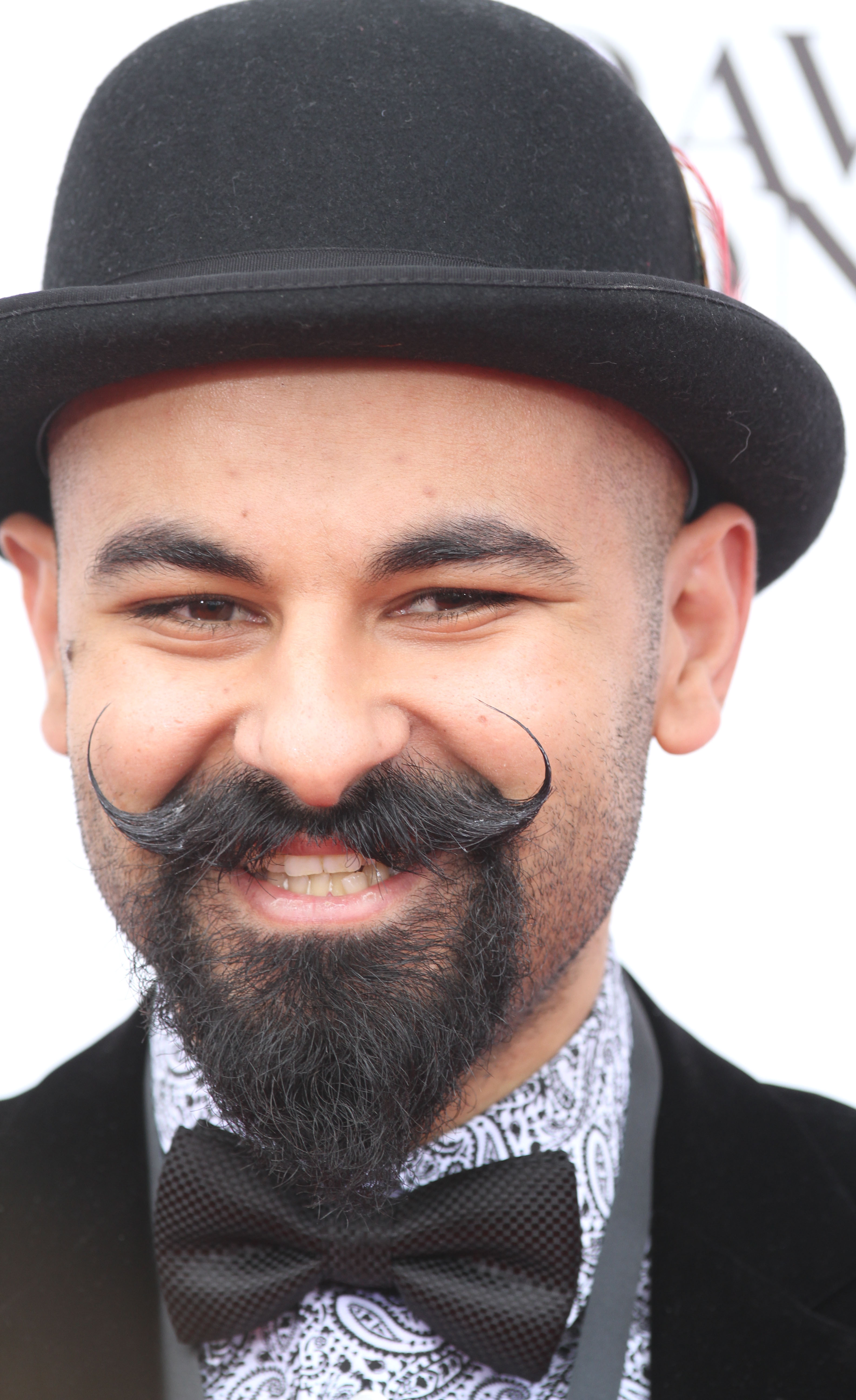
- Tawadros at the 2014 ARIA Music Awards, Sydney, 26 November 2014

Background information
- Born: 6 October 1983 (age 43)
- Origin: Cairo, Egypt
- Genres: Jazz, world, classical
- Occupations: Musician, composer
- Instrument: Oud
- Years active: 1995—present
- Website: josephtawadros.com

Joseph Tawadros AM (born 6 October 1983) is an Egyptian-born Australian award-winning multi-instrumentalist and oud virtuoso. Tawadros has won the ARIA Award for Best World Music Album seven times: 2012, 2013, 2014, 2020, 2021, 2022 and 2023.

== Biography ==
Tawadros' family emigrated from Egypt to Australia when he was three. Initially playing the trumpet, he learnt the oud at age eight, after seeing a movie about Egyptian musician Sayed Darwish. He was School Captain at Randwick Boys High School, where he was taught by Derek Williams. Tawadros is classically trained, having completed a Bachelor of Music degree at the University of New South Wales, where he was awarded a Freedman Fellowship for Classical Music, and in 2025, an honorary doctorate. His brother James Tawadros is a musician who regularly plays percussion, notably the riq, with Joseph.

In the 2000s, Tawadros also studied in Egypt with violinist Esawi Dagher, son of violinist player Abdo Dagher. Tawadros spent three months a year in Egypt and learnt to play other instruments: the bamboo flute nay, the Arabic zither qanun and the cello.

At the 2012 ARIA Music Awards, Tawadros won Best World Music Album for Concerto of the Greater Sea (February 2012). He won the same category in 2013 for Chameleons of the White Shadow (February 2013), 2014 for Permission to Evaporate (May 2014) and 2020 for Live at the Sydney Opera House (June 2020). He also won Best Original Soundtrack, Cast or Show Album in 2017 for Ali's Wedding (September 2017).

== Style ==
Joseph Tawadros' style is described as "eclectic". According to Sydney Morning Herald, "He has taken the oud out of its traditional Middle Eastern setting and into the realm of classical music and jazz." Tawadros told Map Magazine, "I don't like to play in a particular genre, I love all sorts of music […] I try to record an album a year and one that's totally different from the previous album." He has collaborated with musicians such as John Abercrombie, Jack DeJohnette, Roy Ayers, Bela Fleck, Joey DeFrancesco, Richard Tognetti and the Australian Chamber Orchestra, and The Academy of Ancient Music.

Tawadros plays 52 instruments on his albums including oud, qanun, saz, violin, ney, Portuguese guitar, electric bass, kalimba and accordion. His brother James uses 11 percussion instruments.

== Discography ==
=== Albums ===
List of albums with selected details
Title	Details
Storyteller	Released: 2004; Label: Versilia (VACD 104.2); Format: CD
Rouhani (With Bobby Singh)	Released: 2005; Label: ABC Classics (4768078); Format: CD
Visions (With James Tawadros)	Released: February 2006; Label: Joseph Tawadros (JT2005); Format: CD, DD
Epiphany (With James Tawadros and Ben Rodgers)	Released: March 2007; Label: Joseph Tawadros (JT2007); Format: CD, DD; Live album
Angel (With James Tawadros and Dimitri Vouros)	Released: December 2008; Label: Joseph Tawadros (JT2008); Format: CD, DD
The Prophet	Released: March 2009; Label: Joseph Tawadros (JT2009); Format: CD, DD; Note: Poems selected from The Prophet written in 1923 by poet Kahlil Gibran
The Hour of Separation	Released: June 2010; Label: Joseph Tawadros; Format: CD, DD
Band of Brothers (with Slava & Leonard Grigoryan and James Tawadros)	Released: March 2011; Label: ABC Classics (4764316); Format: CD, DD
Concerto of the Greater Sea	Released: February 2012; Label: Joseph Tawadros (JT2012); Format: CD, DD
Chameleons of the White Shadow	Released: February 2013; Label: ABC Classics (4810119); Format: CD, DD
Permission to Evaporate	Released: May 2014; Label: ABC Classics; Format: CD, DD
Truth Seekers Lovers and Warriors	Released: April 2015; Label: ABC Classics (4811632); Format: CD, DD
World Music	Released: March 2016; Label: Joseph Tawadros; Format: CD, DD
Live at Abbey Road (with James Tawadros)	Released: July 2017; Label: Joseph Tawadros; Format: CD, DD; Live album
Ali's Wedding (with Nigel Westlake, Sydney Symphony Orchestra, Slava Grigoryan and Lior)	Released: September 2017; Label: ABC Classics; Format: CD, DD; Soundtrack album
The Bluebird, the Mystic and the Fool	Released: April 2018; Label: Joseph Tawadros; Format: CD, DD
Betrayal of a Sacred Sunflower	Released: June 2019; Label: Joseph Tawadros; Format: CD, DD
Live at the Sydney Opera House (with James Tawadros, Benjamin Northey and the Sydney Symphony Orchestra)	Released: 12 June 2020; Label: ABC Music; Format: CD, DD, streaming; Live album
Hope in an Empty City	Released: 9 June 2021; Label: ABC Music; Format: CD, DD, streaming
History Has a Heartbeat	Released: 19 August 2022; Label: Joseph Tawadros; Format: CD, DD, streaming
Those Who Came Before Us	Released: 14 July 2023; Label: Joseph Tawadros; Format: CD, DD, streaming
The Virtue of Signals	Released: 28 June 2024; Label: Joseph Tawadros; Format: CD, DD, streaming
The Forgotten Path to Humanity	Released: August 2025; Label: Joseph Tawadros; Format: CD, DD, streaming
Conversations With Jack (with Jack DeJohnette, Yacouba Sissoko and James Tawadros)	Released: 31 July 2026; Label: Joseph Tawadros; Format: CD, DD, streaming

== Awards and recognition ==
=== Order of Australia ===
Tawadros was appointed a Member of the Order of Australia in the 2016 Australia Day Honours "for significant service to music as an accomplished oud performer, composer and recording artist".

=== Honorary doctorate ===
In a graduation ceremony held at the University of New South Wales on 2 December 2025, hosted by Vice-Chancellor Dr David Gonski, Tawadros was awarded honoris causa a Doctorate of Music of the university, from which he had previously graduated BMus. As at December 2025, Tawadros is one of only four ever to receive the UNSW honorary DMus degree, the others being Irena Morozov, Simone Young and Richard Tognetti.

=== AIR Awards ===
The Australian Independent Record Awards (commonly known informally as AIR Awards) is an annual awards night to recognise, promote and celebrate the success of Australia's Independent Music sector.

Year	Nominee / work	Award	Result	Ref.
2014	Permission to Evaporate	Best Independent Jazz Album Album	Nominated	
2018	Live at Abbey Road	Best Independent Jazz Album Album	Nominated	
2020	Betrayal of a Sacred Sunflower	Best Independent Classical Album	Nominated	
2021	Live at the Sydney Opera House (with James Tawadros, Sydney Symphony Orchestra and Benjamin Northley)	Best Independent Classical Album or EP	Won	
2022	Hope in an Empty City	Best Independent Jazz Album or EP	Nominated	
2026	The Forgotten Path to Humanity	Best Independent Classical Album or EP	Nominated	

=== ARIA Music Awards ===
The ARIA Music Awards is an annual awards ceremony that recognises excellence, innovation, and achievement across all genres of Australian music. Tawadros has won seven awards from nineteen nominations.

Year	Nominee / work	Award	Result
2004	Storyteller	Best World Music Album	Nominated
2006	Visions (with James Tawadros)	Best World Music Album	Nominated
2007	Epiphany	Best World Music Album	Nominated
2008	Angel	Best World Music Album	Nominated
2010	The Prophet	Best World Music Album	Nominated
2010	The Hours of Separation	Best Jazz Album	Nominated
2011	Band of Brothers (with Slava & Leonard Grigoryan & James Tawadros)	Best World Music Album	Nominated
2012	Concerto of the Greater Sea	Best World Music Album	Won
2013	Chameleons of the White Shadow	Best World Music Album	Won
2014	Permission to Evaporate	Best World Music Album	Won
2015	Truth Seekers, Lovers and Warriors	Best World Music Album	Nominated
2016	World Music	Best World Music Album	Nominated
2017	Live at Abbey Road	Best World Music Album	Nominated
2017	Ali's Wedding (with Nigel Westlake, Sydney Symphony Orchestra, Slava Grigoryan & Lior)	Best Original Soundtrack or Musical Theatre Cast Album	Won
2018	The Bluebird, The Mystic and the Fool	Best World Music Album	Nominated
2019	Betrayal of a Sacred Sunflower	Best World Music Album	Nominated
2020	Live at the Sydney Opera House	Best World Music Album	Won
2021	Hope in an Empty City	Best World Music Album	Won
2022	History Has a Heartbeat (with William Barton)	Best World Music Album	Won
2023	Those Who Came Before Us	Best World Music Album	Won
2024	The Virtue of Signals	Best World Music Album	Nominated
2025	The Forgotten Path to Humanity	Best World Music Album	Nominated

== See also ==
- Copts in Australia
- List of oud players
