= Matt McMahon (pianist) =

Australian jazz pianist and composer

Matt McMahon is an Australian jazz pianist and composer. Winning the 'Wangaratta National Jazz Piano Award' in 1999, and the 'Freedman Jazz Fellowship' in 2005 established his place in Australian jazz. In 2010 his trio supported the Wayne Shorter Quartet at Sydney Opera House. Additionally he has played or recorded with many known jazz artists including Wynton Marsalis, Dale Barlow, Veronica Swift, Robert Hurst, Aaron Goldberg, Greg Osby, Phil Slater, Joseph Tawadros, Katie Noonan, Bobby Previte, Vince Jones, Dave Panichi and Steve Hunter. He has also performed with artists from a range of generic areas including Gurrumul, Sharon Shannon, Mary Coughlan, Australian Chamber Orchestra, Daorum, Elysian Fields, Jackie Orszaczky, Tina Harrod.

Three of the CDs he recorded with Joseph Tawadros won the Australian Recording Industry Award for the best New World Music Album.

McMahon leads his own band 'The Matt McMahon Trio' with bassist Jonathan Brown and drummer Simon Barker, and co-leads the "Band of Five Names" with trumpeter Phil Slater and drummer Simon Barker. He is the musical director for Australian jazz vocalist and trumpeter Vince Jones. He has performed at music festivals and venues in Australia and throughout the world, including the Lincoln Centre, The Cotton Club (Tokyo), Sydney Opera House, Wangaratta Festival of Jazz and JazzNow Festival. He holds a PhD from Sydney University and teaches in the jazz department at Sydney Conservatorium of Music.

He is also a featured artist on the educational website for improvising musicians, jazztuition.com, alongside Simon Barker, Brett Hirst and Ken Stubbs.

McMahon co-presents with Dan Barnett a weekly radio show named Blow on East Side Radio 89.7 FM in Sydney.

== Discography ==
=== As a bandleader/co-leader ===
- Band of Five Names,1999 (co-lead with Phil Slater and Simon Barker)
- Band of Five Names, Severance and Permitude, (Newmarket), 2003
- Band of Five Names, Empty Gardens, (Kimnara), 2006
- Paths and Streams, Kimnara 2007 (debut as a leader),
- Ellipsis, Kimnara 2007
- The Voyage of Mary and William 2015.
- Matt McMahon & Carl Dewhurst, Trapeze For Two Atoms,

=== As a sideman ===
- Joseph Tawadros, Angel, 2008
- Joseph Tawadros, Concerto of the Greater Sea, 2012
- Joseph Tawadros,Permission to Evaporate, 2014
- Joseph Tawadros, Truth Seekers, Lovers & Warriors, 2015
- Leigh Carriage, Mandarin Skyline (Vitamin Records)
- BAECASTUFF: Out of This World
- Natalie Dietz, Casualty, 2023 — ABC music 2023
