= Tonight (Rüfüs song) =

Single by Rüfüs

from the album Atlas
- Released: 22 November 2013
- Length: 3:46
- Label: Sweat It Out!
- Songwriter(s): Jon George; Tyrone Lindqvist; James Hunt
- Producer(s): Jon George; Tyrone Lindqvist; James Hunt

Rüfüs singles chronology
| "Desert Night" (2013) | "Tonight" (2013) | "Sundream" (2014) |

"Tonight" is a song by Australian alternative dance group Rüfüs. The song was released on 22 November 2013 as the third single from the group's debut studio album, Atlas (2013). The song peaked at number 87 on the ARIA Charts in December 2013.

== Music video ==
The music video was directed by Katzki and released on 4 November 2013. The label called the video "vision quest-inducing".

== Track listing ==
Digital single
| No. | Title | Length |
|---|---|---|
| 1. | "Tonight" | 3:46 |
| 2. | "Tonight" (Extended mix) | 6:11 |

Digital single (Remixes volume 1)
| No. | Title | Length |
|---|---|---|
| 1. | "Tonight" | 6:11 |
| 2. | "Tonight" (Amine Edge & DANCE remix) | 7:00 |
| 3. | "Tonight" (Terace remix) | 6:11 |
| 4. | "Tonight" (Rampue remix) | 8:22 |
| 5. | "Tonight" (Kilter remix) | 3:55 |

Digital single (Remixes volume 2)
| No. | Title | Length |
|---|---|---|
| 1. | "Tonight" (Extended edit) | 6:11 |
| 2. | "Tonight" (Danny T remix) | 5:43 |
| 3. | "Tonight" (Yolanda Be Cool remix) | 6:42 |
| 4. | "Tonight" (Wax Motif remix) | 5:13 |
| 5. | "Tonight" (Caseno remix) | 7:10 |

== Charts ==
| Chart (2013) | Peak position |
|---|---|
| Australia (ARIA Chart) | 87 |
| Australian Independent (AIR) | 9 |

== Certifications ==
Certifications for "Tonight"
| Region | Certification | Certified units/sales |
|---|---|---|
| Australia (ARIA) | Gold | 35,000^{‡} |
^{‡} Sales+streaming figures based on certification alone.

== Release history ==
| Country | Version | Date | Format | Label | Catalogue |
|---|---|---|---|---|---|
| Australia | Original | 22 November 2013 | Digital download | Sweat It Out! | G0100030763008 |
| Australia | Remixes (volume 1) | 22 November 2013 | Digital download | Sweat It Out! | SWEATDS106 |
| Australia | Remixes (volume 2) | 11 January 2014 | Digital download | Sweat It Out! | SWEATDS107 |
