= Everything Is A-OK =

Studio album by Violent Soho
- Released: 3 April 2020
- Studio: The Grove Studios (Sydney, Australia)
- Genre: Alternative rock
- Length: 34:17
- Label: I Oh You; Pure Noise
- Producer: Greg Wales

Violent Soho chronology
| Waco (2016) | Everything Is A-OK (2020) |

Singles from Everything Is A-OK
- 1. "A-OK" Released: 14 November 2019; 2. "Vacation Forever" Released: 22 November 2019; 3. "Lying on the Floor" Released: 14 February 2020; 4. "Pick It Up Again" Released: 17 March 2020; 5. "Canada" Released: 3 April 2020; 6. "Slow Down Sonic" Released: 3 September 2020

Everything Is A-OK is the fifth studio album by Australian alternative rock band Violent Soho, released on 3 April 2020 by I Oh You and Pure Noise Records.

Supported by six singles—"A-OK", "Vacation Forever", "Lying on the Floor", "Pick It Up Again", "Canada", and "Slow Down Sonic"—Everything Is A-OK debuted atop the Australian albums chart on 11 April 2020, becoming Violent Soho's second number one album in Australia (following Waco in 2016).

At the 2020 ARIA Music Awards, the album received three nominations—for Best Rock Album, Engineer of the Year (for Greg Wales) and Best Cover Art (for Luke Henery).

== Promotion ==
The band premiered the album through a Q&A livestream on Facebook and YouTube.

== Critical reception ==
Professional ratings
Review scores
| Source | Rating |
|---|---|
| The Music | 4/5 stars |
| Kerrang! | 3/5 |

Emily Blackburn from The Music felt the album was "musically dynamic" and stated that the "Brisbane rock outfit constantly change[s] pace".

== Track listing ==
Everything Is A-OK track listing
| No. | Title | Length |
|---|---|---|
| 1. | "Sleep Year" | 3:27 |
| 2. | "Vacation Forever" | 4:28 |
| 3. | "Pick It Up Again" | 3:10 |
| 4. | "Canada" | 3:29 |
| 5. | "Shelf Life" | 3:31 |
| 6. | "Slow Down Sonic" | 3:45 |
| 7. | "Lying on the Floor" | 3:23 |
| 8. | "Easy" | 3:11 |
| 9. | "Pity Jar" | 3:10 |
| 10. | "A-OK" | 2:43 |
| Total length: | | 34:17 |

== Personnel ==
Adapted from the album's liner notes.

=== Musicians ===
Violent Soho

- James Tidswell — guitar (1–10)
- Michael Richards — drums (1–10)
- Luke Boerdam — guitar, vocals (1–10)
- Luke Henery — bass (1–10)

=== Technical ===
- Greg Wales — production (1–10)
- Will Yip — mixing (1–10)
- Ryan Smith — mastering (1–10)

=== Artwork ===
- Rick Froberg — art
- Ian Laidlaw — photos
- Luke Henery — photos

== Charts ==
=== Weekly charts ===
| Chart (2020) | Peak position |
|---|---|
| Australian Albums (ARIA) | 1 |

=== Year-end charts ===
| Chart (2020) | Position |
|---|---|
| Australian Artist Albums (ARIA) | 49 |

== See also ==
- List of number-one albums of 2020 (Australia)
- List of 2020 albums
