= The Kite String Tangle =

Australian indietronica project

- Born: Daniel Matthew Harley; 1989 (age 36–37); Brisbane, Australia
- Genres: Indie pop; indietronica
- Occupations: Musician; producer
- Years active: 2012–present
- Label: Warner Music Australia
- Website: thekitestringtangle.com

The Kite String Tangle (also known as TKST) is the solo project of Australian, Brisbane-based alternative electronic artist, multi-instrumentalist, and producer Danny Harley. Harley launched the project in 2012 and released an EP titled Vessel in 2014. He has since issued four studio albums: The Kite String Tangle in 2017, The Kite String Tangle Presents: In a Desperate Moment in 2018, C()D3X in 2020, and Lustre in 2023.

== Career ==
The Kite String Tangle released "Given the Chance" as the first single under the moniker in 2013, and it was voted into Triple J's Hottest 100 of 2013.

In August 2014, TKST released his debut EP, Vessel, which peaked at number 8 on the ARIA charts. At the ARIA Music Awards of 2014, the EP was nominated for an ARIA Award for Breakthrough Artist.

In 2014, TKST performed at Falls Festival in Marion Bay, Byron Bay, and Lorne, and also performed at regional festival Groovin' the Moo. In 2015, he performed at SxSW and accompanied Adventure Club at Coachella.

On 14 July 2017, The Kite String Tangle released his debut self-titled album. It peaked at number 36 on the ARIA Charts.

On 13 April 2018, a mini-album, titled The Kite String Tangle Presents: In a Desperate Moment, was released.

In 2019, TKST released the singles "P()l4r" and "Killing Time".

On 31 January 2020, alongside the release of his new single "North", Harley announced that his second studio album, C()D3X, would be released on 20 March 2020.

On 6 October 2023, The Kite String Tangle released the album Lustre.

== Discography ==
=== Studio albums ===
Title	Details	Peak chart positions
Title	Details	AUS
The Kite String Tangle	Released: 14 July 2017; Label: The Kite String Tangle, Warner Music Australia; Format: CD, LP, digital download	36
C()D3X	Released: 20 March 2020; Label: The Kite String Tangle, Warner Music Australia; Format: CD, digital download, streaming	—
Lustre	Released: 6 October 2023; Label: The Kite String Tangle, Warner Music Australia; Format: CD, digital download, streaming	—

=== Mini albums ===
List of mini albums released
Title	Details
The Kite String Tangle Presents: In a Desperate Moment	Released: 13 April 2018; Label: The Kite String Tangle, Warner Music Australia; Format: Digital download, streaming

=== EPs ===
Title	Details	Peak chart positions
Title	Details	AUS
Vessel	Released: 8 August 2014; Label: The Kite String Tangle, Warner Music Australia; Format: CD, digital download	8
Good Catch	Released: 28 July 2023; Label: The Kite String Tangle; Format: Digital download	
Miles Away	Released: 10 November 2023; Label: The Kite String Tangle; Format: Digital download	
Holding Me Back (with Nils Hoffmann)	Released: 5 January 2024; Label: Anjunadeep; Format: Digital download	
So Long	Released: 15 May 2025; Label: The Kite String Tangle; Format: Digital download	
Let U Go	Released: 7 August 2025; Label: The Kite String Tangle; Format: Digital download	

=== Singles ===
==== As lead artist ====
List of singles, with year released and album details shown
Title	Year	Peak chart positions	Certifications	Album
Title	Year	AUS	Certifications	Album
"Commotion"	2013	—		Non-album single
"Given the Chance"	2013	98	ARIA: Gold	Vessel
"Arcadia"	2014	77		Vessel
"Stone Cold" (feat. Tiana Khasi)	2014	—		Vessel
"Illuminate" (with Dustin Tebbutt)	2015	99		Non-album single
"Selfish"	2017	—		The Kite String Tangle
"The Prize" (feat. Bridgette Amofah)	2017	—		The Kite String Tangle
"Waiting"	2017	—		The Kite String Tangle
"This Thing We Got"	2017	—		The Kite String Tangle
"The Heights of Trees"	2018	—		In a Desperate Moment
"Give it Time" (feat. Aalias)	2018	—		Non-album single
"P()l4r"	2019	—		C()D3X
"Killing Time" (feat. Eliott)	2019	—		C()D3X
"North"	2020	—		C()D3X
"I.S.T.A.U."	2020	—		C()D3X
"Fist Fight"	2023	—		Lustre
"Euclidean"	2023	—		Lustre
"A New Day"	2023	—		Lustre
"Good Catch"	2023	—		Lustre
"Miles Away"	2023	—		Lustre
"Need You Here"	2024	—		So Long
"Together"	2025	—		So Long

== Awards and nominations ==
=== ARIA Music Awards ===
The ARIA Music Awards is an annual awards ceremony that recognises excellence, innovation, and achievement across all genres of Australian music. The Kite String Tangle has been nominated for two awards.

Year	Nominee / work	Award	Result
2014	Vessel	Breakthrough Artist	Nominated
2017	The Kite String Tangle	Best Dance Release	Nominated

=== National Live Music Awards ===
The National Live Music Awards (NLMAs) are a broad recognition of Australia's diverse live industry, celebrating the success of the Australian live scene. The awards commenced in 2016.

Year	Nominee / work	Award	Result
2018	The Kite String Tangle	Live Electronic Act (or DJ) of the Year	Nominated

=== Queensland Music Awards ===
The Queensland Music Awards (previously known as Q Song Awards) are annual awards celebrating Queensland, Australia's brightest emerging artists and established legends. They commenced in 2006.

Year	Nominee / work	Award	Result (wins only)
2015	"Arcadia" (directed by Daniel Harley)	Video of the Year	Won
2018	"The Prize" (featuring Bridgette Amofah)	Electronic Song of the Year	Won
2019	"Give it Time" (featuring Aalias)	Electronic Song of the Year	Won
2020	"P()l4r"	Electronic Song of the Year	Won
2020	"P()l4r"	Video of the Year	Won
