= Waco (album) =

Studio album by Violent Soho
- Released: 18 March 2016
- Studios: Brisbane, Queensland; Australia
- Genres: Grunge, alternative rock
- Length: 44:48
- Labels: I Oh You (AUS); SideOneDummy (US)
- Producer: Bryce Moorhead

Violent Soho chronology
Hungry Ghost (2013)	Waco (2016)	Everything Is A-OK (2020)

Singles from Waco
- 1. "Like Soda" Released: 9 October 2015; 2. "Viceroy" Released: 4 February 2016; 3. "So Sentimental" Released: 2 May 2016; 4. "Blanket" Released: 11 July 2016; 5. "No Shade" Released: 30 September 2016; 6. "How To Taste" Released: 17 March 2017

Professional ratings
Review scores
Source	Rating
The AU Review	7.4/10 stars
Music	4.5/5 stars
Rolling Stone	4/5 stars

Waco is the third studio album by Australian alternative rock band Violent Soho. It was released on I Oh You Records in March 2016. The album came first in the annual Triple J Top 10 albums of the year poll.

At the 2016 ARIA Music Awards, the group won Best Group. The album also won Best Rock Album and was nominated for Independent Release. The Waco Tour was nominated for Best Australian Live Act.

At the J Awards of 2016, the album was nominated for Australian Album of the Year.

== Title ==
According to frontman Luke Boerdam, WACO is like Hungry Ghost’s “older sister: Hungry Ghost dealt with the spiritual skeleton we’ve become from this spoon-fed reality. WACO is more about control and illusion: what the skeleton is being fed”.

== Reception ==
The album fared well with critics and came first in Triple Js annual album of the year poll. All six of the album's singles placed within Triple J's Hottest 100 with Like Soda reaching 15 in 2015 and How To Taste, No Shade, So Sentimental, Blanket and Viceroy reaching 92, 73, 69, 53 and 14 respectively in 2016 making Violent Soho the number one act of the year with five songs charting.

== Track listing ==
All music is composed by Violent Soho (Luke Boerdam, James Tidswell, Luke Henery and Michael Richards).

No.	Title	Length
1.	"How to Taste"	4:17
2.	"Blanket"	3:49
3.	"Viceroy"	3:14
4.	"So Sentimental"	4:08
5.	"Like Soda"	4:02
6.	"No Shade"	4:11
7.	"Slow Wave"	4:20
8.	"Evergreen"	3:54
9.	"Holy Cave"	2:59
10.	"Waco"	4:01
11.	"Low"	5:47
Total length:		44:48

== Personnel ==
=== Violent Soho ===
- Luke Boerdam – lead vocals, rhythm guitars
- James Tidswell – lead guitars
- Luke Henery – bass guitar, backing vocals
- Michael Richards – drums, percussion

== Charts ==
=== Weekly charts ===
Chart (2016)	Peak position
Australian Albums (ARIA)	1

=== Year-end charts ===
Chart (2016)	Position
Australian Albums (ARIA)	47

== Certifications ==
Region	Certification	Certified units/sales
Australia (ARIA)	Gold	35,000^{‡}
^{‡} Sales+streaming figures based on certification alone.
