= We Don't Belong Here =

Studio album by Violent Soho
- Released: 7 June 2008
- Recorded: Zero Interference Studios, Brisbane & HeadGap Studios, Melbourne
- Genre: Alternative rock, grunge
- Length: 36:14
- Label: Emergency Music
- Producer: Dean Dirt, Bryce Moorhead

Violent Soho chronology
Pigs & T.V. (2006)	We Don't Belong Here (2008)	Violent Soho (2010)

Professional ratings
Review scores
Source	Rating
Rolling Stone	3/5 stars
Polaroids of Androids	(7.7/10)
Rave Magazine	(positive)

We Don't Belong Here is Violent Soho's debut studio album, released on 7 June 2008 on the Magic Dirt imprint, Emergency Music. Many of the tracks on the album were remastered and re-written for Violent Soho's self-titled album, which is considered by many to be the band's first proper album.

== Track listing ==
All music is composed by Violent Soho.

No.	Title	Length
1.	"Love Is A Heavy Word"	2:44
2.	"Jesus Stole My Girlfriend"	2:29
3.	"Son Of Sam"	3:39
4.	"Muscle Junkie"	3:15
5.	"My Generation"	3:14
6.	"Dumb Machine"	3:37
7.	"Bombs Over Broadway"	3:34
8.	"Birth Of The Teen-Age"	7:10
9.	"Outsider"	3:04
10.	"Scrape It"	3:27
Total length:		36:14

== Personnel ==
- Produced by Dean Dirt
- Additional production on tracks 5 and 7 by Bryce Moorhead
- Tracks 1, 4-8 recorded and mixed with Bryce Moorhead at Zero Interference Studios, Brisbane.
- Tracks 2, 3, 9, and 10 recorded and mixed with Sloth at HeadGap Studios, Melbourne.
- Mastered by Lindsay Gravina at Birdland Studios, Melbourne.
- Artwork by Luke Boerdam
- Photography by Brad Hymie
