= Sundream (song) =

Single by Rüfüs

from the album Atlas
- Released: 21 March 2014
- Length: 4:35
- Label: Sweat It Out
- Songwriter(s): Jon George; Tyrone Lindqvist; James Hunt
- Producer(s): Jon George; Tyrone Lindqvist; James Hunt

Rüfüs singles chronology
"Tonight" (2013)	"Sundream" (2014)	"You Were Right" (2015)

"Sundream" is a song by Australian alternative dance group Rüfüs. The song was released on 21 March 2014 as the fourth and final single from the group's debut studio album, Atlas (2013). The song peaked at number 47 on the ARIA Chart, becoming the group's first top 50 single.

At the 2014 Australian Independent Record Labels Association Awards, the song was nominated for Best Independent Dance/Electronica or Club Single.

At the ARIA Music Awards of 2014, the song was nominated for Best Group and Best Dance Release.

== Reception ==
auspOp described the song as a "glorious burst of dazzling pop sunshine".

Larry Day from Music OMH said ""Sundream" skitters through the white-hot synth pads of '90s Ministry of Sound chillout compilations, Ibiza afterparties and the dawn breeze on a hangover. It's holiday hedonism encapsulated in 4:35 of blissed-out aural Bacchanalia."

== Music video ==
The music video was directed by Katzki and Jackson Mullane and released on 15 April 2014.

== Track listing ==
Digital single
No.	Title	Length
1.	"Sundream"	4:35
2.	"Sundream" (Claptone remix)	6:57
3.	"Sundream" (Hayden James remix)	3:44
4.	"Sundream" (Wordlife remix)	4:39

Remixes single
No.	Title	Length
1.	"Sundream" (radio edit)	3:45
2.	"Sundream" (album version)	4:35
3.	"Sundream" (Claptone remix)	6:57
4.	"Sundream" (Hayden James remix)	3:44
5.	"Sundream" (Wordlife remix)	4:39
6.	"Sundream" (Wordlife remix)	4:39
7.	"Sundream" (Classixx remix)	5:19
8.	"Sundream" (Casino Gold remix)	4:48

== Charts ==
Chart (2014)	Peak position
Australia (ARIA)	47
Australian Independent (AIR)	5

== Certifications ==
Region	Certification	Certified units/sales
Australia (ARIA)	2× Platinum	140,000^{‡}
^{‡} Sales+streaming figures based on certification alone.

== Release history ==
Country	Version	Date	Format	Label	Catalogue
Australia	Single	21 March 2014	Digital download	Sweat It Out	SWEATDS117
United Kingdom	Remixes	7 September 2014	Digital download	Sweat It Out / Sony	
