= Take Me (Rüfüs song) =

Single by Rüfüs

from the album Atlas
- Released: 8 March 2013
- Length: 4:03
- Label: Sweat It Out
- Songwriter(s): Jon George; Tyrone Lindqvist; James Hunt
- Producer(s): Jon George; Tyrone Lindqvist; James Hunt

Rüfüs singles chronology
"This Summer" / "Selena" (2012)	"Take Me" (2013)	"Desert Night" (2013)

"Take Me" is a song by Australian alternative dance group Rüfüs. The song was released on 8 March 2013 as the lead single from the group's debut studio album, Atlas (2013). The song debuted at number 87 in April 2013 and peaked at number 61 in March 2014. The song was certified platinum in Australia in 2018.

At the 2013 Australian Independent Record Labels Association Awards, the song was nominated for Best Independent Dance/Electronica or Club Single.

== Reception ==
Your EDM said ""Take Me" is a flawless fusion of deep and tropical house. Filled to brim with infectious melodies and bouncy chords, "Take Me" will undoubtedly leave you longing for sunshine, ocean breezes and all things summer."

== Music video ==
The music video was directed by Katzki and released on 6 March 2013.

== Track listing ==
Digital single
No.	Title	Length
1.	"Take Me" (Original Mix)	4:03
2.	"Take Me" (Cassian remix)	6:00
3.	"Take Me" (BareSkin remix)	6:39
4.	"Take Me" (Polographia remix)	5:01

Digital single (Adapt Or Die remix)
No.	Title	Length
1.	"Take Me" (Adapt Or Die remix)	4:56

European digital single
No.	Title	Length
1.	"Take Me" (Original mix)	4:03

== Charts ==
Chart (2013)	Peak position
Australia (ARIA Chart)	61
Australian Independent (AIR)	2

== Certifications ==
Region	Certification	Certified units/sales
Australia (ARIA)	2× Platinum	140,000^{‡}
^{‡} Sales+streaming figures based on certification alone.

== Release history ==
Country	Version	Date	Format	Label	Catalogue
Australia	Original	8 March 2013	Digital download	Sweat It Out	SWEATDS061
Australia	Adapt or Die remix	15 March 2013	Digital download	Sweat It Out	SWEATDS061A
United Kingdom	Remixes	24 April 2014	Digital download	Sweat It Out! / Sony	
Europe	Original	11 July 2014	Digital download	Be Yourself	
