= Hungry Ghost (album) =

Studio album by Violent Soho
- Released: 6 September 2013
- Studios: Brisbane, Queensland; Australia
- Genres: Grunge, alternative rock
- Length: 44:12
- Labels: I Oh You (AUS); SideOneDummy (US)

Violent Soho chronology
Violent Soho (2010)	Hungry Ghost (2013)	Waco (2016)

Singles from Hungry Ghost
- 1. "In the Aisle" Released: 8 July 2013; 2. "Covered in Chrome" Released: 16 October 2013; 3. "Saramona Said" Released: 17 February 2014; 4. "Fur Eyes" Released: 12 June 2014

Professional ratings
Review scores
Source	Rating
AllMusic	2.5/5 stars
Sputnikmusic	3.9/5

Hungry Ghost is the third studio album by Australian alternative rock band Violent Soho. It was released on I Oh You Records in September 2013.

== Title ==
According to the band's frontman Luke Boerdam, the title of the album and the song of the same name, originally referring to Chinese Buddhism, was taken from the book Culture Jam by Canadian civil activist Kalle Lasna and allegorically implies a person who, in an effort to fulfil his desire, loses himself. Boerdam has also said Hungry Ghost "dealt with the spiritual skeleton we've become from this spoon-fed reality."

== Track listing ==
All music is composed by Violent Soho.

Hungry Ghost track listing
No.	Title	Length
1.	"Dope Calypso"	5:06
2.	"Lowbrow"	3:33
3.	"Covered in Chrome"	3:35
4.	"Saramona Said"	4:02
5.	"In the Aisle"	3:44
6.	"OK Cathedral"	4:46
7.	"Fur Eyes"	4:35
8.	"Gold Coast"	3:03
9.	"Liars"	3:44
10.	"Eightfold"	4:06
11.	"Hungry Ghost"	4:17
Total length:		44:12

Hungry Ghost 10th Anniversary LP2
No.	Title	Length
12.	"Dope Calypso (Live at Splendour in the Grass)"
13.	"In the Aisle (Live at Splendour in the Grass)"
14.	"Neighbour Neighbour (Live at Splendour in the Grass)"
15.	"Saramona Said (Live at Mansfield Tavern)"
16.	"Fur Eyes (Live at Splendour in the Grass)"
17.	"Covered in Chrome (Live at Mansfield Tavern)"
18.	"Follow Me Here (Demo)"
19.	"Domestic La La"
20.	"Home Haircut"

== Personnel ==
Violent Soho

- Luke Boerdam – lead vocals, rhythm guitars
- James Tidswell – lead guitars
- Luke Henery – bass guitars, backing vocals
- Michael Richards – drums, percussion

== Charts ==
2013 weekly chart performance for Hungry Ghost
Chart (2013)	Peak position
Australian Albums (ARIA)	6

2023 weekly chart performance for Hungry Ghost
Chart (2023)	Peak position
Australian Albums (ARIA)	2

== Certifications ==
Certifications for Hungry Ghost
Region	Certification	Certified units/sales
Australia (ARIA)	Gold	35,000^{^}
^{^} Shipments figures based on certification alone.

== ARIA Awards ==
Year	Nominee / work	Award	Result
2014	"Saramona Said"	Best Group	Nominated
2014	"Saramona Said"	Best Independent Release	Nominated
2014	"Covered in Chrome"	Best Video	Nominated
