= Violent Soho =

Australian rock band

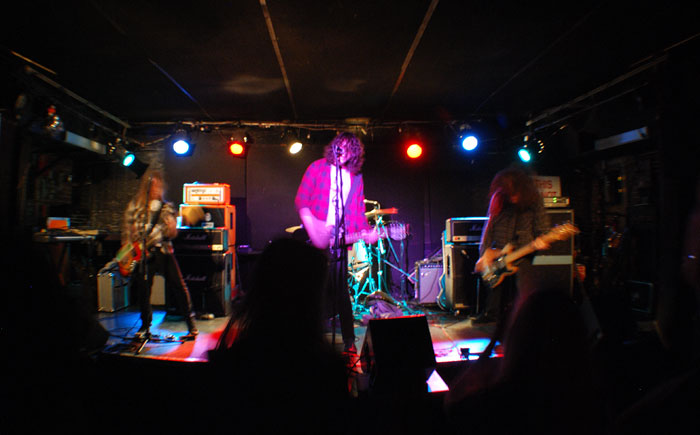
- Violent Soho at the Mercury Lounge in 2009

Background information
- Origin: Brisbane, Queensland, Australia
- Genres: Grunge; alternative rock
- Years active: 2004–2022, 2026–present
- Labels: Emergency Music; Ecstatic Peace!; I Oh You; SideOneDummy; Dine Alone
- Members: Luke Boerdam; Luke Henery; James Tidswell; Michael Hardy
- Past members: Michael Richards
- Website: www.violentsoho.com

Violent Soho are an Australian alternative rock band that was formed in 2004 in the Brisbane suburb of Mansfield, Queensland, originally under the name of Showroom. For the majority of the band's existence, the line-up was composed of Luke Boerdam (lead vocals, guitar), James Tidswell (guitar, backing vocals), Luke Henery (bass, backing vocals) and Michael Richards (drums, backing vocals). Their sound has been compared to that of 1980s and 1990s alternative rock bands such as the Pixies, Mudhoney, Smashing Pumpkins, and Nirvana. Although being largely described as grunge, the band self described themselves as a "stoner pop" band. The band's third studio album, Hungry Ghost, was certified Gold in Australia in September 2014. Their fourth album, Waco, debuted at number 1 on the Australian ARIA Charts in 2016. The band's fifth album, Everything Is A-OK, was released on 3 April 2020 and also debuted at number 1 on the ARIA charts.

== History ==
=== Early years ===
The band members all attended Citipointe Christian College in Mansfield together, and as of 2008 continued to reside there. The postcode of the suburb, "4122", appears in the band's merchandise artwork and frequently appears in band-related images.

In an interview with Tidswell and Boerdam at the 2013 Push Over event in Melbourne, Victoria, both members explained that they attended a religious youth group as children, while Boerdam was in a chapel band with drummer Richards. Tidswell revealed in 2014 that he is originally from New Zealand, explaining: "In New Zealand I had to ride a bike to school in the rain every morning when I was four years old, and now I live in Queensland and I never wear a raincoat".

The band named themselves after the Rancid song "Ruby Soho" and Tidswell's wishes to be named "Violent"; the two names were "married".

=== 2006–2008: Pigs & T.V. EP, We Don't Belong Here ===
Their debut EP, Pigs & T.V., was released in 2006. Consisting of songs written by Boerdam at 14 years of age, the recording was funded by the sale of Tidswell's car. The EP was produced by Bryce Moorhead, a Brisbane-based producer and sound engineer who the band discovered through early shows they performed with Brisbane punk bands Eat Laser Scumbag! and Gazoonga Attack.

The EP received a positive review in Blunt Magazine—the reviewer gave it an "8" rating (out of 10), writing: "Sounding like The Vines fed on raw meat and produced on a fraction of the budget, Violent Soho are a boisterous pop rock combo from Brissyland reviving the spirit of the grunge era." Writing for the Mess+Noise music website, Jo Nilson described the EP as "both tuneful and snottily defiant", and "an amazing effort, considering their [the band] bawdy pop sensibilities". Liam McGinniss, a reviewer for the Faster Louder website, wrote a positive review of the EP, concluding:

While Violent Soho occasionally reflect their obvious influences (Nirvana, The Vines, et al.) a little too closely, it's refreshing to see a band with such a clear vision, as well as deft skill and power with their instruments. A slick and polished effort in a time when many debuts are too rough around the edges to take seriously, Pigs And TV is an excellent snapshot of a band with unlimited potential, and the skill and ambition to fulfill it.

Following the release of their debut EP, the band continued to play shows in and around Brisbane as well as several shows in Sydney, Melbourne and elsewhere on the east coast of Australia. During this period, Magic Dirt's Dean Turner—who died in April 2009—commenced managing the band. Violent Soho toured with fellow Queensland band The Grates in 2007 and were included in the lineup of the 2008 St Jerome's Laneway Festival, playing with the event in Melbourne, Brisbane and Sydney of that year.

Violent Soho toured with Faker and Grafton Primary in May 2008, playing songs from their first full-length album, We Don't Belong Here. The album was released on 7 June 2008 on the Emergency Music label, an independent imprint run by Turmer's band Magic Dirt, who were also friends at the time. Following the release of the inaugural studio album, the band toured throughout Australia, followed by shows during November 2008 in New York, Los Angeles and London. Upon their return home, Violent Soho played more shows and festivals held during the southern summer—late 2008/early 2009—including Homebake, Meredith Music Festival, Falls Festival and Southbound Festival.

=== 2009–2011: Ecstatic Peace! signing, relocation to US, Violent Soho ===
On 20 February 2009, Violent Soho announced on their MySpace page that they had signed an "overwhelmingly exciting" deal with Ecstatic Peace! Records, a record company headed by Sonic Youth's Thurston Moore, a hero of the band. They also signaled their intention to spend much of 2009 touring Australia, touring and recording in the US, and mentioned that a new album that "elaborated" on the material recorded for We Don't Belong Here was due for worldwide release in the third quarter of 2009.

In mid-2009, the band recorded their self-titled second album with producer Gil Norton at Rockfield Studios in Wales. Moore presented the band with several options, including Butch Vig and John Agnello, but the band selected Norton as they wanted someone who would be "a bit pushy". After a conversation between Moore and Norton, the producer rearranged his schedule to accommodate the band, as he liked the demo recordings he was sent. Violent Soho worked with Norton for five weeks at the Rockfield complex, where the band lived in an on-site apartment for the entire duration of recording, and Boerdam described the experience following their return to Brisbane afterwards:

We all got to stay together in the same spot for five weeks. I think that was great for the band. It wasn't like tour, where everyday you're going somewhere, you're worried about how you're going to pay for petrol. It was the opposite. It was in the middle of the countryside, really quiet, 30 minutes walk from the nearest town. So really we got to focus on just doing the album, putting the songs to rest ... Gil [Norton] has the whole Lovetone [analog] pedal range. They're pedals from the UK that aren't made anymore … I spent hours with them, experimenting with sounds. When we recorded the first album, there was no experimentation.

The band relocated to the US prior to the early 2010 release of Violent Soho and shared an apartment in the "poorer parts of Brooklyn" in New York City. However, due to a hectic touring schedule, the band was rarely at home and played five to six nights each week. While in the US, the band released a limited-edition, vinyl 7-inch EP—consisting of re-recorded versions of "Bombs Over Broadway" and "Son of Sam"—in 2009 that was only sold during a 2010 US tour.

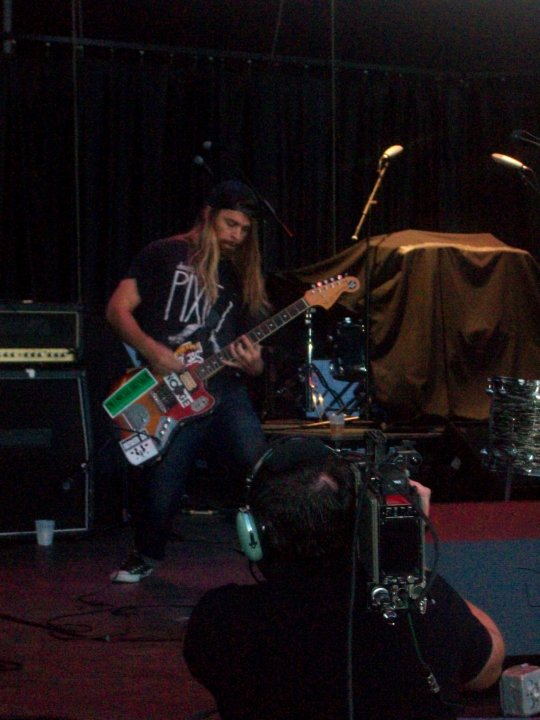
James Tidswell performing at Summerfest

On 9 March 2010, Violent Soho released their second, self-titled album on Ecstatic Peace! that consisted of some reworked selections from We Don't Belong Here. "Jesus Stole My Girlfriend" was the first single release from the album. The single was also re-recorded with new vocals by Boerdam in Simlish for The Sims 3: Ambitions soundtrack. The band would part ways with Moore's label following the album's release and returned to Australia in 2011 after more than a year in the US. In 2013 Boerdam stated:

Being on Thurston Moore's label doesn't happen that often for an Australian band. It gave us a great sense of validation as a band. Just being able to quit your day job and tour for 18 months made us better. Whether it results in Facebook likes or record sales I don't care, the real impact was more personal.

=== 2011–2016: Return to Australia, I Oh You signing, Hungry Ghost ===
Violent Soho performed at the 2011 Laneway Festival, followed by an Australian tour supporting Australian alternative rock band Jebediah in mid-2011. The band was then chosen by Les Savy Fav to perform at the ATP Nightmare Before Christmas festival that the latter co-curated—together with Caribou and Battles—in December 2011 in Minehead, England, UK. The band toured Australia with English band Arctic Monkeys in early 2012.

Violent Soho was nominated for an ARIA Award in 2012 and Tidswell revealed in an October 2013 interview that he received congratulations from friends while on his way to seek employment at a local McDonald's store, as the band was no longer signed to a label and was without any financial support at the time. The band also needed to restart the songwriting process, and Boerdam explained that "we had a hell of a lot of work on our hands."

The band then signed to the Melbourne-based Australian independent record label "I OH YOU" and released a new single called "Tinderbox" on 27 August 2012. In November 2012, an Australian tour coincided with the release of the double-single "Tinderbox"/"Neighbour Neighbour" and a music video was produced for "Neighbour Neighbour". Boerdam stated in March 2013 that the relationship with I OH YOU was a beneficial one, as the label head, who Boerdam described as a "legend", understands the perspective of the band and the band never feels like they are asking too much of the label, "which is always good for our band".

In a January 2014 interview, Boerdam reflected on the attitude that the band adopted following their return to Australia:

This time we had all the time in the world. We were thinking, "we do it our way or we don't do it." We were sick of listening to how bands were meant to do it. That was the big difference in the album: time. Doing it at home, doing it down the road from where we all live, taking our time and delivering a sound and a record that we particularly wanted to do.

In April 2013, the band revealed via their Facebook account that they were in the process of recording their next full-length album. The album was produced by Moorhead, described by Boerdam as "Brisbane's version of Steve Albini" (Moorhead's main form of employment is tree lopping), and recorded at Darek Mudge's Shed Studios. Boerdam stated that the band was judicious with the songs that they agreed to record for the album and did not hesitate to discard substandard material: "It was just about being willing to throw away things that didn't make the cut ... You have to be willing to do that. It took us [nearly] two years to work out what was good."

In July 2013, Violent Soho announced that their next album is entitled Hungry Ghost and will be released on the I Oh You label on 6 September 2013—the first single, "In The Aisle", was released on 8 July 2013. Regarding the sound of the album, Boerdam asserted in an October 2013 interview: "There's no reason to lock the band down to that grunge label which we were constantly given, despite us never using that word. We realised that we didn't care, as long as we were happy with the music we were making."

A video for the song "In The Aisle" was released on 16 July 2013. Directed by Tristan Houghton, the video documents a nude cyclist riding around Brisbane distributing flyers for an actual nude bike ride event. Tidswell and Boerdam explained in August 2013 that the video features Brisbane musician and local nudist activist Dario Western, who received nationwide attention for his nudist event through morning television programs. Dario was involved with the filming of the "Neighbour Neighbour" music video, but he did not appear in the final version, so the band asked him to appear as the sole actor in "In The Aisle". Boerdam stated that the attention received by Dario eclipsed the publicity experienced by Violent Soho.

A video for the song "Covered in Chrome", filmed in Henery's house, was released on 16 October 2013 and concludes with a person setting fire to items on a clothesline in the backyard. In response to a question about concerns regarding the potential for damage to Henery's residence, caused by the music video concept, Boerdam stated: "... it was his [Henery] problem … It’s a rental, so we just said 'Do you have a lease? Yeah, cool, let’s do it'". Ideas and imagery in the lyrics for the song were informed by a Wikipedia article about the Hungarian uprising in 1956 which Boerdam had been reading.

The album title was inspired by the Kalle Lasn book Culture Jam. As Boerdam explained in a September 2013 online article, "From memory the term went something like this: 'We sit around on couches, buying what we think makes us who we are, like a hungry ghost'. I looked up hungry ghost and it actually comes from traditional Chinese Buddhism. It means to have a non-shakable addiction/desire, and you lose yourself to that desire, you lose your identity." Regarding the general themes of the album's lyrics, Boerdam said: "Throughout the record I play with the idea of escaping a masked reality. I like to explore this concept that we live in a form of hyper-consumer reality and we lack an authentic human experience. In a few songs I try and focus on outsider suburban characters that are usually hidden and outcast by society, reenacting tapping into their reality and what they view as normal".

Hungry Ghost was identified by the Faster Louder online publication as the fourth-best album of 2013. A reference is made to Faster Louder's September review of the album, in which it wrote that the "fingerprints of Shihad, Japandroids, Wavves, Bleeding Knees Club, Blink-182 and Children Collide" appear on the album.

The band toured with the Australian Big Day Out festival in January 2014 and during a backstage interview at the Sydney leg, Tidswell explained:

We grew up going to Big Days Out on the Gold Coast… Luke [Boerdam] bought a ticket when he was 16 and his parents wouldn't let him go so he pegged a cereal bowl at the wall and said "Fuck you", ran away and went to Big Day Out. I got to see my favourite band in the year 2000, Blink-182, that was sick. So we're stoked to be on Big Day Out ...

During the 2014 Big Day Out tour, Boerdam stated that his favourite songs to play live at the time were "Dope Calypso" and "OK Cathedral", while Tidswell identified "OK Cathedral" and "Lowbrow".

"Covered in Chrome" was voted into the fourteenth position on the Triple J Hottest 100, 2013. The band stated in an early January 2014 interview that they were not confident of ranking in the top 20 for the poll. However, the Triple J Hottest 100 of the 2010s saw "Covered in Chrome" place fourth.

In March 2014, the band was selected by triple J for its annual "One Night Stand" event, a free regional festival that celebrated its tenth anniversary in 2013. Alongside artists such as Illy and Dan Sultan, the band will play in the rural city of Mildura, Victoria. The "Saramona Said" music video, in which a group of four young friends drive to a Violent Soho performance, was uploaded to the I OH YOU YouTube channel on 8 April 2014. The band collaborated with director Dan Graetz on the video, and the cast consists of Mikey Wulff, Hannah Wagner, Tom Butler and Cole Orr. In June 2014, the band signed a record deal with US label SideOneDummy Records for an American release of Hungry Ghost in September.

In late June 2014, New Noise Magazine reported that Hungry Ghost had reached the sixth position on the Australian album chart and the band had signed with American record label SideOneDummy for a September 2014 release of the album in the US. In a July 2014 interview, Boerdam replied to a question about the follow-up to Hungry Ghost:

I haven't listened to Hungry Ghost in eight months, and I don't intend to listen to it again for a long time. I play it live enough. I've already started writing. Obviously the next thing is another record. I think the approach to Hungry Ghost was good for our band, so we won't start recording it till it's ready to go. I don't think you have to change your sound every record and be fucking Radiohead going from OK Computer to Kid A or anything like that. But I do think progression is healthy ... The writing's started. When that progresses into a whole album and when it's released, I have no idea. I'm just gonna keep writing until I strike songs where I think "fuck, this is great" and I'm personally pleased. Until I feel good about it, we won't bother to hit a studio.

Boerdam also stated that the band is open to gaining international exposure in locations such as Europe and the US.

The band attained "gold" status for Hungry Ghost in September 2014, after 30,000 units of the album were sold in Australia. The owner of the band's record label said to the media: "We couldn't be more proud of the guys or feel more honoured to have played a small part in the band’s life over the last few years… and we certainly couldn't be anymore psyched to see what the future holds." Violent Soho announced the "No Sleep Til Mansfield" national Australian tour, scheduled for November–December 2014, to commemorate the achievement. Prior to the commencement of the tour, a music video for the Hungry Ghost song "Eightfold" was premiered on 27 October 2014. The album was placed at number 60 on the ARIA Year-End Albums Chart of 2014.

In October 2015, the band released a Split 7-inch Vinyl with the American punk rock band Spraynard. It included two new songs from Violent Soho (Domestic Lala/ Home haircut), as well a new song from Spraynard.

=== 2016–2019: Waco ===
On 3 February 2016, the band announced the release date of their fourth studio album, titled Waco, as 18 March 2016, and a promotional single, "Viceroy", was subsequently released on YouTube. After Waco was chosen as the 'Feature Album' by triple j for the week beginning 14 March 2016, it placed in the number 1 position on the Australian iTunes albums chart, while seven shows of the May 2016 album tour had sold out. The album debuted at number 1 on the ARIA Charts.

The band headlined the 2017 edition of the regional Groovin the Moo festival, which were the band's last official shows before taking an extended break.

During the band's break, Henery formed a new band, Total Pace. Tidswell served as producer on Dune Rats' third studio album, Hurry Up and Wait, while Richards played sets as a fill-in drummer for WAAX and Tired Lion.

=== 2019–2022: Everything is A-OK and hiatus ===
On 14 November 2019, the band released a new song called "A-OK," following a series of teaser posters and billboards being posted around Sydney, Melbourne and Brisbane. A week later, they released a second single, entitled "Vacation Forever". The song saw the band place in the Triple J Hottest 100 of 2019, placing 69th.

In December 2019, the band performed their first live shows since 2017 at the Good Things Festival in Sydney, Melbourne and Brisbane. A music video for "Vacation Forever" was released, compiled of footage from these performances.

In early February 2020, the band subtly announced that they would be playing three intimate headlining shows the following week in Sydney, Melbourne and Brisbane. Instead of making an official announcement, the band sent out paper flyers promoting the shows. Access to tickets was made available only via in-person purchase at either Red Eye Records in Sydney, Oh! Jean Records in Melbourne or Rocking Horse Records in Brisbane. At the record stores, it was revealed that the band's new album was titled Everything is A-OK, and was set for release on 3 April 2020.

In July 2022, the band announced an indefinite hiatus. They shared the following statement on social media:

After nearly 20 years in Violent Soho we've experienced so much as a band - It's been incredible and life-defining. We feel so grateful to have experienced the journey and to all the people that believed in our music and showed us so much support. However, as individuals we've found ourselves in different places over the last few years and so we've decided it's time to take a break and lay low for a bit. This isn't the end of the band, but we are looking forward to giving ourselves some space, focusing on our families, and giving back to the community which fostered and carried us.

With the announcement also came the release of a new single, "Kamikaze", which was later released on 7'' vinyl alongside single "Better Homes and Gardens".

The band played their final shows on September 9 and 10, 2022, at Brisbane's Fortitude Music Hall.

=== 2026–present: Reunion ===
In March 2026, Boerdam and Tidswell joined Mark Hoppus on stage during his spoken-word show at the Sydney Opera House to perform "Dammit" together. At the show, Hoppus hinted that the band would soon be reuniting. This was later confirmed in April 2026, when the band announced their first shows in four years for September 2026.

== Cover versions ==
As part of the triple J radio station's segment "Like a Version", the band Northeast Party House performed a live-to-air cover version of "Covered in Chrome" on 15 July 2014. The version incorporated an electro influence as well as a Lorde reference.

On 21 May 2015, Violent Soho were again covered on the "Like a Version" program by Perth band Tired Lion. The cover was performed live in conjunction with a verse of The Smashing Pumpkins' song, "1979".

On 14 April 2016, Modern Baseball performed a faithful rendition of the Violent Soho track "Dope Calypso" for the "Like a Version" program.

== Perspectives ==
Tidswell appeared in a short documentary film directed by Dan Graetz, who directed the "Covered in Chrome" music video, in which he spoke about the business of music from an artist's perspective. Sponsored by the Jack Daniel's alcohol manufacturer, Graetz filmed Tidswell alongside other musicians such as Kate Miller-Heidke to gain insight into the state of the Australian music industry and published the documentary—called "The Truth About Money in Music" and just under ten minutes in length—on 20 July 2014. Tidswell spoke about the concept of "selling out" as part of his contribution:

People, you know, they put the big deal on, you know, "selling out" and that sort of thing, and, in all honesty, there is not much difference between taking money from, you know, some brand and some record label. I mean, it's pretty similar stuff. In some ways, it's better to take it from the brand because you don't have to pay the money back.

== Personal lives ==
The band members explained during a January 2014 interview that they are all employed, in addition to their roles in the band. In January 2014, Tidswell explained that he treats every night like a New Year's Eve party, while the rest of the band adopt a similar approach when they are together. However, Tidswell and Boerdam admitted that close friends the DZ Deathrays have a greater capacity in terms of a party lifestyle, and consistently outlast the members of Violent Soho, who are typically unable to continue beyond midnight. In August 2013, Tidswell explained that an adoption of the Brisbane mindset means to "get high and play music".

Boerdam explained in July 2014 that the history of the band is one in which members have prioritised personal concerns: "We put a lot of things in our personal lives first, above the band ... I've seen other bands treat it so seriously ... Sometimes that can be a band's undoing, when they start talking to each other as if they're employees".

== Members ==
Current members

- Luke Boerdam – lead vocals, guitar (2004–2022, 2026–present)
- James Tidswell – guitar, backing vocals (2004–2022, 2026–present)
- Luke Henery – bass guitar, backing vocals (2004–2022, 2026–present)
- Michael Hardy – drums, percussion, backing vocals (2021–2022, 2026–present)

Former members

- Michael Richards – drums, percussion, backing vocals (2004–2021)

Live substitutes

- Raul Sanchez – guitar, backing vocals (2013)
- Sophie Hopes – guitar, backing vocals (2021)
- Tim Maxwell – guitar, backing vocals (2022)

== Discography ==
- We Don't Belong Here (2008)
- Violent Soho (2010)
- Hungry Ghost (2013)
- Waco (2016)
- Everything Is A-OK (2020)

== Awards and nominations ==
=== AIR Awards ===
The Australian Independent Record Awards (commonly known informally as AIR Awards) is an annual awards night to recognise, promote and celebrate the success of Australia's Independent Music sector.

Year	Nominee / work	Award	Result	Ref.
2014	Violent Soho	Best Independent Artist	Nominated	
2014	Hungry Ghost	Best Independent Album	Won	
2014	Hungry Ghost	Best Independent Hard Rock/Punk Album	Won	
2014	"Covered in Chrome"	Best Independent Single or EP	Nominated	
2017	WACO	Best Independent Hard Rock, Heavey or Punk Album	Won	
2021	Everything Is A-OK	Best Independent Punk Album or EP	Nominated	

=== APRA Awards ===
The APRA Awards are presented annually from 1982 by the Australasian Performing Right Association (APRA).

Year	Nominee / work	Award	Result	Ref.
2014	"Covered in Chrome"	Song of the Year	Shortlisted	
2015	"Saramona Said"	Song of the Year	Shortlisted	
2017	"Viceroy"	Song of the Year	Shortlisted	

=== ARIA Music Awards ===
The ARIA Music Awards is an annual awards ceremony that recognises excellence, innovation, and achievement across all genres of Australian music.

Year	Nominee / work	Award	Result	Ref.
2010	Violent Soho	Best Hard Rock/Heavy Metal Album	Nominated	
2014	"Saramona Said"	Best Group	Nominated	
2014	"Saramona Said"	Best Independent Release	Nominated	
2014	Dan Graetz for "Covered in Chrome"	Best Video	Nominated	
2014	National Tour	Best Australian Live Act	Nominated	
2016	Waco	Best Group	Won	
2016	Waco	Best Independent Release	Nominated	
2016	Waco	Best Rock Album	Won	
2016	Dan Graetz for "Like Soda"	Best Video	Nominated	
2016	The WACO Tour	Best Australian Live Act	Nominated	
2017	Violent Soho with Special Guests the Bronx	Best Australian Live Act	Nominated	
2020	Everything Is A-OK	Best Rock Album	Nominated	
2020	"Pick It Up Again"	Best Video	Nominated	
2020	Greg Wales for Everything Is A-OK	Producer of the Year	Nominated	
2020	Luke Henery for Everything Is A-OK	Best Cover Art	Nominated	

=== J Award ===
The J Awards are an annual series of Australian music awards that were established by the Australian Broadcasting Corporation's youth-focused radio station Triple J. They commenced in 2005.

Year	Nominee / work	Award	Result	Ref.
2016	WACO	Australian Album of the Year	Nominated	
2020	Violent Soho - "Pick It Up Again"	Australian Video of the Year	Nominated	

=== National Live Music Awards ===
The National Live Music Awards (NLMAs) are a broad recognition of Australia's diverse live industry, celebrating the success of the Australian live scene. The awards commenced in 2016.

Year	Nominee / work	Award	Result	Ref.
2016	themselves	Live Act of the Year	Nominated	
2016	themselves	Live Hard Rock Act of the Year	Won	
2016	themselves	Queensland Live Act of the Year	Won	
2017	themselves	Queensland Live Act of the Year	Won	
2020	themselves	Queensland Live Act of the Year	Nominated	
2020	Luke Henery (Violent Soho)	Live Bassist of the Year	Nominated	
2020	James Tidswell (Violent Soho)	Live Guitarist of the Year	Nominated	

=== Queensland Music Awards ===
The Queensland Music Awards (previously known as Q Song Awards) are annual awards celebrating Queensland, Australia's brightest emerging artists and established legends. They commenced in 2006.

Year	Nominee / work	Award	Result (wins only)
2015	Hungry Ghost	Album of the Year	Won
2016	"Like Soda"	Song of the Year	Won
2016	"Like Soda"	Rock Song of the Year	Won
2017	WACO	Album of the Year	Won
