= List of Splendour in the Grass line-ups =

This is a list of Splendour in the Grass line-ups.

== 2001-2010 ==
=== 2001 ===
- Michael Franti & Spearhead (US)
- Stephen Malkmus and the Jicks (US)
- Squarepusher (UK)
- Resin Dogs
- Pnau
- 28 Days
- Frenzal Rhomb
- Powderfinger
- Something for Kate
- Magic Dirt
- Superheist
- King Kapisi (New Zealand)
- Sunk Loto
- george
- Endorphin
- Groove Terminator
- Couchfunk DJs
- DJ Ransom
- 2 Dogs

=== 2002 ===
- Supergrass (UK)
- Gomez (UK)
- Black Rebel Motorcycle Club (US)
- Blackalicious (US)
- Krafty Kuts (UK)
- Doves (UK)
- Bentley Rhythm Ace (UK)
- Jebediah
- Gerling
- george
- Sonic Animation
- 1200 Techniques
- Grinspoon
- Spiderbait
- Rocket Science
- Machine Gun Fellatio
- Katalyst
- Kid Kenobi
- The Sleepy Jackson
- Resin Dogs
- One Dollar Short
- Bodyjar
- Paul Mac
- Waikiki
- John Butler Trio
- Cut Copy
- Fort
- Rhibosome
- Dan Brodie and the Broken Arrows
- Dexter
- Good Buddha
- Noodles
- Drag
- Kalliope
- Offcutts
- 2 Dogs

=== 2003 ===
- Coldplay (UK)
- Placebo (UK)
- Goldfrapp (UK)
- The Music (UK)
- Veruca Salt (US)
- Death in Vegas (UK)
- Ugly Duckling (US)
- Ladytron (UK)
- Adam Freeland (UK)
- Alpinestars (UK)
- Motion Man and KutMasta Kurt (US)
- Magic Dirt
- The Sleepy Jackson
- Powderfinger
- The Living End
- Jet
- Gerling
- Sarah Blasko
- John Butler Trio
- Downsyde
- The Casanovas
- Decoder Ring
- Ajax
- Katalyst
- Frenzal Rhomb
- Sunk Loto
- 1200 Techniques
- The Superjesus
- The Fergusons
- Screamfeeder
- The Mess Hall
- James de la Cruz
- The Bumblebeez
- The Re-Mains
- Goodwill
- Richard Fearless
- Overdub
- Nick Taylor & Jackie Onassid

=== 2004 ===
- PJ Harvey (UK)
- Jurassic 5 (US)
- MC5 (US)
- Franz Ferdinand (UK)
- Dizzee Rascal (UK)
- Snow Patrol (UK)
- Fiery Furnaces (US)
- Dashboard Confessional (US)
- Ash (UK)
- Electric Six (US)
- Ozomatli (US)
- Money Mark (US)
- Grinspoon
- Spiderbait
- The Dissociatives
- Xavier Rudd
- Eskimo Joe
- 1200 Techniques
- Sonic Animation
- Sneaky Sound System
- Hilltop Hoods
- Cut Copy
- Ground Components
- Rocket Science
- Pete Murray
- Infusion
- The Herd
- Katalyst
- James De La Cruz
- Bexta
- Acre
- The Tremors
- Groove Dalley
- Slinky
- Vanlustbader
- DJ Peril

=== 2005 ===
- Moby (US)
- Queens of the Stone Age (US)
- Ryan Adams (US)
- Interpol (US)
- Bloc Party (UK)
- Mercury Rev (US)
- Doves (UK)
- Har Mar Superstar (US)
- Futureheads (UK)
- Willy Mason (US)
- Athlete (US)
- Caribou (Canada)
- Finn Brothers (New Zealand)
- The Living End
- Scribe (New Zealand)
- Shihad (New Zealand)
- The Beautiful Girls
- Sarah Blasko
- The Grates
- Cut Copy
- Pnau
- Decoder Ring
- After the Fall
- Katalyst
- Hilltop Hoods
- Gerling
- Butterfingers
- P-Money (New Zealand)
- Downsyde
- Kid Confucius
- pUss
- Atlantic
- Drag
- DJ Dexter
- Strawberry Syme
- Archie

=== 2006 ===
- Brian Wilson (US)
- Sonic Youth (US)
- Scissor Sisters (US)
- Death Cab for Cutie (US)
- DJ Shadow (US)
- Yeah Yeah Yeahs (US)
- Snow Patrol (UK)
- José González (SWE)
- TV on the Radio (US)
- Matisyahu (US)
- Atmosphere (US)
- The Zutons (UK)
- Mogwai (UK)
- Mos Def (US)
- Dungen (Sweden)
- Grinspoon
- Wolfmother
- You Am I
- The Vines
- The Presets
- Pete Murray
- The Grates
- Augie March
- Youth Group
- Josh Pyke
- Gerling
- Paul Mac
- Bob Evans
- TZU
- Lior
- Something for Kate
- The Avalanches
- Tex Perkins
- Angus and Julia Stone
- Van She
- Clare Bowditch & The Feeding Set
- Decoder Ring
- The Exploders
- Butterfingers
- The Predators
- Brittle Fex
- N'fa
- Raz Bin Sam & The Lion I Band
- Andrew Morris
- The Love Bus

=== 2007 ===
- Arctic Monkeys (UK)
- Bloc Party (UK)
- Kaiser Chiefs (UK)
- Lily Allen (UK)
- MGMT
- The Shins (US)
- Editors (UK)
- Ash (UK)
- Hot Chip (UK)
- The Horrors (UK)
- Ok Go (US)
- Tilly and the Wall (US)
- Dirty Three
- Paul Kelly
- The Waifs
- Gotye
- Sarah Blasko
- Powderfinger
- Hoodoo Gurus
- Spiderbait
- Grinspoon
- Sneaky Sound System
- Cut Copy
- Expatriate
- Midnight Juggernauts
- The Cat Empire
- Josh Pyke
- The Beautiful Girls
- The Panics
- Howling Bells
- Muscles
- Holly Throsby
- The Predators
- Hilltop Hoods
- The Herd
- Kisschasy
- Operator Please
- Airbourne
- Blue King Brown
- Planet Asia (US)
- Magnolia Electric Co (US)
- Riot in Belgium
- Sara Tindley
- Wild Marmalade
- Lost Valentinos
- Bumblebeez
- Teenager
- Funktrust DJ's
- Old Man River

=== 2008 ===
- Devo (US)
- Wolfmother
- Sigur Rós (Iceland)
- The Living End
- Polyphonic Spree (US)
- New Young Pony Club (UK)
- The Presets
- Tricky (UK)
- Vampire Weekend (US)
- Ben Lee
- Cold War Kids (US)
- Lyrics Born (US)
- The Fratellis (UK)
- The Wombats (UK)
- Pnau
- Laura Marling (UK)
- The Vines
- The Grates
- Tokyo Police Club (Canada)
- Albert Hammond Jr. (US)
- Operator Please
- Band of Horses (US)
- Van She
- The Panics
- Gyroscope
- MSTRKRFT (Canada)
- Scribe (New Zealand)
- The Music (UK)
- Robert Forster
- Clare Bowditch
- Lightspeed Champion (UK)
- Little Red
- Bluejuice
- The Drones
- Hadouken! (UK)
- Bliss N Eso
- Paul Dempsey
- Katalyst
- Even
- British India
- Yves Klein Blue
- Delta Spirit (US)
- The Galvatrons
- The Gin Club
- Slot Machine (Thailand)
- The Black Stars
- Van She
- Kato
- Bag Raiders
- ELF. DJ
- Soft Tigers Food Fight
- pob
- DJ Spex

=== 2009 ===
- The Flaming Lips (US)
- Bloc Party (UK) – only Australian show
- Happy Mondays (UK)
- MGMT (US) – only Australian show
- Doves (UK)
- The Specials (UK)
- Friendly Fires (UK)
- White Lies (UK)
- The Gutter Twins (US)
- Manchester Orchestra (US)
- Yuksek (France)
- Dananananaykroyd (UK)
- Grinspoon
- Hilltop Hoods
- Sarah Blasko
- Augie March
- Midnight Juggernauts
- Architecture in Helsinki
- The Living End
- Josh Pyke
- Little Birdy
- The Beautiful Girls
- Downsyde & Drapht
- Decoder Ring
- Kisschasy
- Children Collide
- Bluejuice
- Little Red
- Dappled Cities
- Paul Dempsey
- Yves Klein Blue
- The Middle East
- Birds of Tokyo
- Lost Valentinos
- Bob Evans
- You Am I
- Kram
- Bridezilla
- Holly Throsby
- Miami Horror
- Art vs. Science
- Leader Cheetah
- Glass Towers
- Cut Copy
- Deya Dova
- Jack Ladder
- Polaroid Fame
- Yacht Club DJs
- Canyons
- Jack Shit
- Daniel Webber
- Pablo Calamari & Shivers
- Raz Bin Sam & DJ Wade
- Oshi One
- Dee Dee
- Double Vision
- Strange Planet
- Dave C
- Nick Taylor
- Kaliba
- Gravy
- Zenna
- Si Clone
- Dark Nebula
- Slinky
- Pob
- Deegs
- Captain Kaine
- Tommi Gunn
- Ruff Dimond
- Sista Ray
- DJ Spex

Notes

- Jane's Addiction cancelled their Australia tour the day before their scheduled appearance due to drummer Stephen Perkins' hospitalisation. The Living End were their replacement

=== 2010 ===
- The Strokes (US)
- Pixies (US) – only Australian show
- Relentless7 (US) – only Australian show
- The Temper Trap
- Mumford & Sons (UK)
- Florence and the Machine (UK)
- Goldfrapp (UK)
- Scissor Sisters (US)
- Empire of the Sun
- ~~The Ting Tings (UK)~~
- Band of Horses (US)
- LCD Soundsystem (US)
- Grizzly Bear (US)
- Foals (UK)
- Hot Chip (UK)
- Passion Pit (US)
- Laura Marling (UK)
- Kate Nash (UK)
- Yeasayer (US)
- Broken Social Scene (Canada)
- Band of Skulls (UK)
- Surfer Blood (US)
- The Drums (US)
- Jónsi (Iceland)
- Ash (UK)
- We Are Scientists (US)
- K-Os (Canada)
- Black Rebel Motorcycle Club (US)
- Two Door Cinema Club (Ireland)
- RPA & The United Nations of Sound (UK)
- Alberta Cross (UK)
- Fanfarlo (UK)
- Midlake (US)
- Delphic (UK)
- School of Seven Bells (US)
- The Magic Numbers (UK)
- Frightened Rabbit (UK)
- Angus and Julia Stone
- Art vs. Science
- Wolfmother
- The Vines
- Tame Impala
- Paul Kelly
- Operator Please
- Lisa Mitchell
- Midnight Juggernauts
- Little Red
- Space Invadas
- British India
- Miami Horror
- The Middle East
- Bluejuice
- Clare Bowditch
- Philadelphia Grand Jury
- The Mess Hall
- Violent Soho
- Horrorshow
- Megan Washington
- Yacht Club DJs
- Whitley
- Dan Sultan
- Cloud Control
- Jinja Safari
- Oh Mercy
- John Steel Singers
- Jonathan Boulet
- Boy & Bear
- Gypsy and the Cat
- Ernest Ellis
- Pensioner
- Last Dinosaurs
- Tim and Jean
- RVLR
- DJ Spex and MC Hernan

Notes

- The Tings Tings cancelled their appearance due to rescheduling their album release. Art vs Science were announced as replacements.

== 2011-present ==
=== 2011 ===
- Coldplay (UK) – only Australian show
- Kanye West (US) – only Australian show
- Jane's Addiction (US) – only Australian show
- The Hives (Sweden)
- Pulp (UK)
- The Living End
- The Mars Volta (US) – only Australian show
- Regina Spektor (US) – only Australian show
- Bliss n Eso
- Mogwai (UK) – only Australian show
- DJ Shadow (US)
- Friendly Fires (UK)
- Glasvegas (UK)
- Devendra Banhart and The Grogs (US)
- Modest Mouse (US)
- The Middle East
- Kaiser Chiefs (UK)
- James Blake (UK)
- Kele Okereke (UK)
- The Vines
- Elbow (UK)
- Eskimo Joe
- Noah and the Whale (UK)
- Children Collide
- Thievery Corporation (US)
- Cut Copy
- Isobel Campbell and Mark Lanegan (UK/US)
- Bluejuice
- The Kills (US)
- Black Joe Lewis & the Honeybears ft. The Relatives (US)
- Architecture in Helsinki
- Foster the People (US)
- The Panics
- Jebediah
- The Vaccines (UK)
- Gomez (UK)
- Boy & Bear
- Gotye
- Does It Offend You, Yeah? (UK)
- Cloud Control
- Mona (US)
- Sparkadia
- Warpaint
- Muscles Live
- Fitz and the Tantrums (US)
- The Jezabels
- Drapht
- British Sea Power (UK)
- Tim & Jean
- Leader Cheetah
- Grouplove (US)
- Seeker Lover Keeper
- Yelle (France)
- Kimbra (New Zealand)
- Phrase
- Oh Mercy
- Dananananaykroyd (UK)
- The Black Seeds (New Zealand)
- Marques Toliver (US)
- The Holidays
- Ghoul
- Liam Finn (New Zealand)
- The Herd
- Young the Giant (US)
- Guineafowl
- Hungry Kids of Hungary
- Jinja Safari
- Wild Beasts (UK)
- Illy
- Cut Off Your Hands (New Zealand)
- Gareth Liddiard
- Alpine
- World's End Press
- Mosman Adler
- Lanie Lane
- The Aston Shuffle
- Flight Facilities
- D-Cup
- Ajax
- Wax Motif
- DJ Spex and MC Hernan
- Triple J Unearthed winners

=== 2012 ===
- Jack White (US)
- Bloc Party (UK) – only Australian show
- The Smashing Pumpkins (US)
- At the Drive-In (US) – only Australian show
- The Shins (US)
- Hilltop Hoods
- The Kooks (UK) – only Australian show
- Miike Snow (Sweden)
- Gossip (US) – only Australian show
- Dirty Three – only Australian show
- Lana Del Rey (US)
- 360
- Azealia Banks (US) – only Australian show
- Tame Impala
- Explosions in the Sky (US) – only Australian show
- Band of Skulls (UK)
- Ladyhawke (New Zealand)
- The Afghan Whigs (US)
- Missy Higgins
- Wolfmother
- Metric (Canada)
- Kimbra (New Zealand)
- Mudhoney (US)
- 50 Years of Dylan (tribute band)
- Spiderbait
- Django Django (UK)
- Gypsy & The Cat
- San Cisco
- Last Dinosaurs
- Electric Guest (US)
- Muscles
- Angus Stone
- DZ Deathrays
- Howler (US)
- Lanie Lane
- Fun. (US)
- Big Scary
- Michael Kiwanuka (UK)
- Seekae
- Friends (US)
- Yacht Club DJ's
- Bertie Blackman
- Jinja Safari
- Blue King Brown
- Youth Lagoon (US)
- Pond
- The Beautiful Girls
- Yuksek (France)
- Tijuana Cartel
- Ball Park Music
- The Rubens
- Ben Howard (UK)
- Bleeding Knees Club
- Zulu Winter (UK)
- The Medics
- Shihad (New Zealand)
- Hypnotic Brass Ensemble (US)
- Husky
- Kate Miller-Heidke
- Father John Misty (US)
- Emma Louise
- Chet Faker
- Here We Go Magic (US)
- Parachute Youth
- Mosman Alder
- The Cast of Cheers (Ireland)
- Wolf & Cub
- Gossling
- Beni
- Sampology AV/DJ show
- Canyons DJ set
- Nina Las Vegas
- Danny T
- Alison Wonderland
- Luke Million
- Nice and Ego AV/DJ show
- Flume
- Gloves
- Harris Robotis
- Alley Oop
- DJ Spex
- Booty Quest
- Play
- Survivor DJ’s
- Triple J Unearthed winners

=== 2013 ===
- Mumford & Sons (UK) – only Australian show
- The National (US) – only Australian show
- ~~Frank Ocean (US)~~
- Of Monsters and Men (Iceland)
- Empire of the Sun
- Bernard Fanning
- The Presets
- TV on the Radio (US) – only Australian show
- Klaxons (UK)
- Flume
- Babyshambles (UK) – only Australian show
- Passion Pit (US)
- Birds of Tokyo
- James Blake (UK)
- Architecture in Helsinki
- Laura Marling (UK)
- Matt Corby
- Drapht
- Alt-J (UK)
- Flight Facilities
- Polyphonic Spree (US)
- Boy & Bear
- Fat Freddy's Drop (New Zealand)
- Cold War Kids (US)
- The Rubens
- Sarah Blasko
- Darwin Deez (US)
- You Am I
- Hermitude
- Haim (US)
- Airbourne
- The Drones
- MS MR (US)
- Gurrumul
- Everything Everything (UK)
- Clairy Browne & the Bangin' Rockettes
- Cloud Control
- Portugal. The Man (US)
- Daughter (UK)
- Something for Kate
- Wavves (US)
- Chet Faker
- Snakadaktal
- Robert Delong (US)
- Unknown Mortal Orchestra (New Zealand)
- Whitley
- Fidlar (US)
- Jake Bugg (UK)
- The Bamboos
- Surfer Blood (US)
- Deap Valley (US)
- Palma Violets (UK)
- Alpine
- Little Green Cars (Ireland)
- Vance Joy
- Jagwar Ma
- Villagers (Ireland)
- Violent Soho
- Dune Rats
- PVT
- The Jungle Giants
- Cub Scouts
- Art of Sleeping
- The Growl
- Twinsy
- The Chemist
- Songs
- Mitzi
- Triple J Unearthed winners
- Alison Wonderland
- Yolanda Be Cool
- What So Not
- Xaphoon Jones (US)
- DCUP
- Otologic
- Peking Duk
- Tyler Touche
- Bad Ezzy
- DJ Spex
- Lorde (New Zealand)

Notes

- Sunday headliner Frank Ocean cancelled his Australian tour while in Australia due to illness. The Sunday Main Stage program was pushed an hour and Lorde was the last minute replacement who played in the afternoon. Of Monsters and Men became the Sunday headliner.
- Babyshambles cancelled all their sideshows. Their appearance at Splendour was their only show in Australia.

=== 2014 ===
- Outkast (US) – only Australian show
- ~~Two Door Cinema Club (UK) – only Australian show~~ (Note: Two Door Cinema Club withdrew from the lineup and were replaced by UK outfit Foals. City And Colour replaced Two Door Cinema Club as headliners, Foals took over City And Colour's slot right before.)
- Lily Allen (UK)
- Interpol (US) – only Australian show
- City and Colour (Canada)
- Foster the People (US)
- Childish Gambino (US)
- Hilltop Hoods
- Angus & Julia Stone
- Foals (UK) – only Australian show
- ~~London Grammar (UK)~~ (Note: London Grammar withdrew from the lineup due to illness and were replaced by The Presets.)
- The Presets
- Vance Joy
- Darkside (US) – only Australian show
- Rüfüs Du Sol
- Ben Howard (UK)
- Kelis (US)
- Metronomy (UK)
- Hoodoo Gurus
- Chvrches (UK) – only Australian show
- Grouplove (US)
- The Jezabels
- Tune-Yards (US)
- 360
- Wild Beasts (UK)
- Danny Brown (US) – only Australian show
- Illy
- First Aid Kit (Sweden)
- Violent Soho
- Ásgeir (Iceland)
- Spiderbait
- The 1975 (UK)
- Ball Park Music
- Art vs Science
- Sam Smith (UK) – only Australian show (Note: Sam Smith, Childish Gambino and Hilltop Hoods were announced one week after the initial announcement. Despite not being announced, Sam Smith was a festival exclusive.)
- Buraka Som Sistema (Portugal) – only Australian show
- The Preatures
- Parquet Courts (US) – only Australian show
- Sticky Fingers
- Peking Duk
- Sky Ferreira (US)
- Future Islands (US)
- Courtney Barnett
- Phantogram (US)
- DZ Deathrays
- Skaters (US)
- Gossling
- Jungle (UK)
- The Strypes (IRL)
- Hot Dub Time Machine
- The Kite String Tangle
- RY X
- Mikhael Paskalev (Norway)
- Wave Racer
- The Acid (UK/US/Australia)
- Saskwatch
- Kingswood
- Circa Waves (UK)
- Broods (New Zealand)
- Dustin Tebbutt
- The Head and the Heart (US)
- DMA's
- Darren Middleton
- Little May
- Darlia (UK)
- D.D Dumbo
- Tkay Maidza
- The Creases
- The Wild Feathers (US)
- Chrome Sparks (US)
- Fractures
- Mas Ysa (Canada)
- Nick Mulvey (UK)
- Triple J Unearthed winners
- Nina Las Vegas
- Yacht Club DJs
- Motez
- Touch Sensitive
- Indian Summer
- Wordlife
- L D R U & Yahtzel DJs
- Cosmo's Midnight
- Sable
- Kilter
- Basenji
- KLP (musician)
- Fishing DJs
- Paces
- Charles Murdoch
- DJ Spex

=== 2015 ===
- Blur (UK)
- Florence and the Machine (UK)
- Mark Ronson (UK)
- Of Monsters and Men (Iceland)
- The Wombats (UK)
- Tame Impala
- Peking Duk
- Ryan Adams (US)
- Flight Facilities
- Royal Blood (UK) — only Australian show
- Death Cab for Cutie (US)
- Earl Sweatshirt (US)
- Boy & Bear
- Porter Robinson Live (US)
- The Dandy Warhols (US) — only Australian show
- Xavier Rudd & The United Nations
- Azealia Banks (US)
- The Rubens
- Jamie T (UK)
- Pond
- Spiritualized (UK) — only Australian show
- Alison Wonderland
- Thundamentals
- Best Coast (US)
- Everything Everything (UK)
- San Cisco
- MS MR (US)
- Jarryd James
- Purity Ring (Canada)
- ~~Allday~~ (Note: Allday withdrew from the lineup just hours before he was scheduled to perform due to a family emergency.)
- Carmada
- The Grates
- The Smith Street Band
- Tkay Maidza
- Johnny Marr (UK)
- Last Dinosaurs
- Megan Washington
- The Vaccines (UK)
- #1 Dads
- The Church
- Kitty, Daisy & Lewis (UK)
- The King Khan & BBQ Show (Canada)
- Alpine
- ~~Catfish and the Bottlemen (UK)~~ (Note: Catfish and the Bottlemen withdrew from the lineup two days before the festival began due to illness. They were replaced by DZ Deathrays.)
- DZ Deathrays
- Paul Mac
- Dustin Tebbutt
- MØ (Denmark)
- Years & Years (UK)
- Jenny Lewis (US)
- C.W. Stoneking
- Seekae
- George Maple
- Elliphant (Sweden)
- Client Liaison
- Palma Violets (UK)
- Safia
- Hayden James
- Dune Rats
- Wolf Alice (UK)
- Meg Mac
- Cosmo's Midnight
- Marmozets (UK)
- Oh Mercy
- Mansionair
- The Districts (US)
- Shlohmo (US)
- Elizabeth Rose
- The Delta Riggs
- Circa Waves (UK)
- Nancy Whang (US)
- Eves the Behaviour
- Urban Cone (Sweden)
- Art of Sleeping
- Japanese Wallpaper
- Gengahr (UK)
- Bad//Dreems
- Ecca Vandal
- Holy Holy
- Vallis Alps
- UV boi فوق بنفسجي
- The Babe Rainbow
- Harts
- Generik
- Young Franco
- Mickey Kojack
- GL
- Benson
- Harvey Sutherland
- Total Giovanni
- Dugong Jr
- I'lls
- Akouo
- Noise In My Head
- Triple J Unearthed winners
- Joyride
- Post Percy
- Ara Koufax
- CC:Disco!
- Adi Toohey
- Set Mo
- Edd Fisher
- Mike Who
- Shantan Wantan Ichiban

=== 2016 ===
==== Friday, 22 July ====
- The Strokes (US) — only Australian show
- The Avalanches — only Australian show
- Violent Soho
- The 1975 (UK)
- The Kills (US/UK)
- DMA's
- Nothing But Thieves (UK)
- High Tension
- Alex Lahey
- Hermitude
- Human Movement
- Illy
- Years & Years (UK)
- Swick
- Jack Garratt (UK)
- Kacy Hill (US)
- Total Giovanni
- Ribongia
- Sampa the Great
- Band of Horses (US)
- Leon Bridges (US)
- Peter Bjorn and John (Sweden)
- Emma Louise
- Robert Forster
- Fat White Family (UK)
- Methyl Ethel
- The Wild Feathers (US)
- Motez
- Lucy Clichè
- Roland Tings
- Dro Carey
- Mall Grab
- KLLO
- World Champion
- Nicole Millar

==== Saturday, 23 July ====
- The Cure (UK) (Note: The Cure were the only festival headliner in history initially scheduled to play longer than the usual 75-90 minute headline slot, playing for 3 hours. This also meant The Cure are the only headliners to start their set before 10pm.)
- At the Drive-In (US)
- Sticky Fingers
- Gang of Youths
- King Gizzard & the Lizard Wizard
- Beach Slang (US)
- Harts
- PLTS
- Santigold (US)
- Moonbase Commander
- What So Not
- Crystal Fighters (UK)
- The Meeting Tree
- Snakehips (UK)
- Lido (Norway)
- Boo Seeka
- Purple Sneaker DJs
- Slum Sociable
- Ngaiire
- Matt Corby
- James Vincent McMorrow (Ireland) — only Australian show
- Ball Park Music
- Michael Kiwanuka (UK)
- Kim Churchill
- Spring King (UK)
- In Loving Memory of Szymon
- Montaigne
- L D R U
- Dom Dolla
- Opiuo
- Paces
- Banoffee
- Dreller
- Running Touch

==== Sunday, 24 July ====
- Flume
- James Blake (UK)
- Boy & Bear
- Courtney Barnett
- Tegan and Sara (Canada)
- City Calm Down
- Melbourne Ska Orchestra
- Blossoms (UK)
- Green Buzzard
- Sigur Rós (Iceland) — only Australian show
- Planete
- Duke Dumont (UK) – DJ set
- Golden Features
- Twinsy
- Jagwar Ma
- The Internet (US)
- Urthboy
- Amateur Dance
- Lapsley (UK)
- Jess Kent
- Jake Bugg (UK)
- The Preatures
- Mark Lanegan (US)
- The Jungle Giants
- Marlon Williams (New Zealand)
- Little May
- Tired Lion
- Gold Class
- Slumberjack
- Ganz
- Just A Gent
- Wafia
- Remi
- Feki
- Suzi Zhen

=== 2017 ===
==== Friday, 21 July ====
- The xx (UK)
- HAIM (US)
- Vance Joy
- ~~George Ezra~~ (Note: George Ezra withdrew from the lineup, moving Peking Duk to the opening day of the festival on Friday, 21 July and extending both LCD Soundsystem's & Sigur Ros' set times on Sunday, 23 July.)
- Peking Duk
- Tash Sultana
- Big Scary
- Kingswood
- Ocean Grove
- Wharves
- RL Grime (US)
- Cut Copy
- Super Cruel
- Banks (US)
- Swindail
- Lil Yachty (US)
- The Kite String Tangle
- Cosmo's Midnight
- Lewis Cancut
- Vera Blue
- Winston Surfshirt
- Father John Misty (US)
- San Cisco
- Real Estate (US)
- D.D Dumbo
- Julia Jacklin
- Maggie Rogers (US)
- The Wilson Pickers
- Jarrow
- Nite Fliet
- DJHMC
- Young Franco
- Luke Million
- Set Mo
- Alice Ivy
- Willow Beats

==== Saturday, 22 July ====
- Queens of the Stone Age (US)
- Royal Blood (UK)
- Catfish and the Bottlemen (UK)
- Future Islands (US)
- Bernard Fanning
- Dune Rats
- Luca Brasi
- Hockey Dad
- Two Door Cinema Club (Ireland)
- Allday
- Dena Amy
- Rag'n'Bone Man (UK)
- Andy Garvey
- Slumberjack
- Vallis Alps
- Bag Raiders
- Sam Weston
- Confidence Man
- Mallrat
- Paul Kelly
- Asgeir (Iceland)
- Dan Sultan
- Dope Lemon
- BAD//DREEMS
- Julien Baker (US)
- Middle Kids
- Gretta Ray
- Late Nite Tuff Guy
- Tornado Wallace
- Harvey Sutherland & Bermuda
- CC:Disco!
- Topaz Jones
- Romare
- Airling

==== Sunday, 23 July ====
- LCD Soundsystem (US)
- Sigur Rós (Iceland)
- Schoolboy Q (US)
- Client Liaison
- The Smith Street Band
- LANY (US)
- The Peep Tempel
- The Murlocs
- Bonobo (UK)
- Planete
- Stormzy (UK)
- Thundamentals
- Christopher Port
- Tove Lo (Sweden)
- A.B. Original
- Bishop Briggs (UK)
- Moonbase Commander
- Kinder
- Kuren
- King Gizzard & the Lizard Wizard
- Meg Mac
- Pond
- Oh Wonder (UK)
- The Lemon Twigs (US)
- Kirin J. Callinan
- Amy Shark
- Good Boy
- Oneman
- HWLS
- Kilter
- Enschway
- Topaz Jones
- Mookhi
- Willaris.K

=== 2018 ===
- Kendrick Lamar (US)
- Lorde (New Zealand) — only Australian show
- Vampire Weekend (US) — only Australian show
- Khalid (US) — only Australian show
- The Wombats (UK)
- Hilltop Hoods
- Chvrches (UK)
- Miguel (US)
- Girl Talk (US) — only Australian show
- Angus & Julia Stone
- Gang of Youths
- Franz Ferdinand (UK)
- MGMT (US)
- Ben Howard (UK)
- Dune Rats & Friends
- Ben Harper & Charlie Musselwhite (US)
- Pnau
- James Bay (UK)
- The Avalanches DJ Set
- ~~Chromeo (Canada)~~ (Note: Chromeo withdrew from the lineup due to health related reasons and were replaced by The Presets.)
- The Presets
- DMA's
- Ball Park Music
- Henry Rollins (US) — only Australian show
- Safia
- The Jungle Giants
- Lil Xan (US)
- Methyl Ethel
- Amy Shark
- The Bronx (US)
- Ocean Alley
- Carmada by L D R U & Yahtzel
- DZ Deathrays
- Lord Huron (US)
- Middle Kids
- Hockey Dad
- Towkio (US)
- Cub Sport
- Touch Sensitive
- Sampa the Great
- Dean Lewis
- Skegss
- Albert Hammond Jr. (US)
- Mallrat
- Marmozets (UK)
- Alex Lahey
- Riton & Kah-Lo (UK/Nigeria)
- Jack River
- Superorganism
- Anna Lunoe (US)
- Lewis Capaldi (UK)
- All Our Exes Live in Texas
- Alex the Astronaut
- Yungblud (UK)
- Crooked Colours
- Nina Las Vegas
- Soccer Mommy (US) — only Australian show
- Elderbrook (UK)
- Rolling Blackouts Coastal Fever
- Tim Sweeney (US)
- Stella Donnelly
- Bully (US)
- Baker Boy
- Wafia
- No Mono
- Waax
- Angie McMahon
- West Thebarton
- Eves Karydas
- G Flip
- The Babe Rainbow
- Haiku Hands
- Didirri
- Alice Ivy
- Amyl and the Sniffers
- Ziggy Ramo
- Fantastic Man
- Lo'99
- Human Movement
- Manu Crooks
- Kasbo (Sweden)
- Madam X (UK)
- Andras
- Alta
- Ara Koufax
- Two People
- B Wise
- Made In Paris
- Jensen Interceptor
- Woodes
- Teischa
- Antony and Cleopatra (UK)
- Muto
- Triple J Unearthed winners
- Elk Road
- Mike Gurrieri
- Love Deluxe
- Lauren Hansom
- Poolclvb
- Godlands
- Nyxen
- Emma Stevenson
- Ebony Boadu

=== 2019 ===
- ~~Chance the Rapper (US) — only Australian show~~ (Note: Chance the Rapper withdrew from the lineup the day before he was scheduled to perform due to illness. He was replaced by Hilltop Hoods.)
- Hilltop Hoods
- Tame Impala
- Childish Gambino (US)
- SZA (US)
- Foals (UK)
- Catfish and the Bottlemen (UK)
- James Blake (UK)
- Santigold (US) — only Australian show
- The Lumineers (US)
- The Streets (UK)
- Russ (US)
- What So Not
- Courtney Barnett
- Warpaint (US)
- Ocean Alley
- Matt Corby
- Wolf Alice (UK)
- Friendly Fires (UK)
- Broods (New Zealand)
- Dean Lewis
- Fidlar (US)
- Cosmo's Midnight
- Meg Mac
- Ziggy Alberts
- Hayden James
- Dave (UK)
- Dope Lemon
- Dermot Kennedy (Ireland)
- Allday and Friends
- Little Simz (UK)
- The Rubens
- Maribou State (UK)
- Winston Surfshirt
- Tycho (US)
- Pond
- The Teskey Brothers
- Jacob Banks (UK)
- Wolfmother
- Tropical Fuck Storm
- Kyle Hall (US)
- Local Natives (US)
- Mansionair
- Odette
- Ruby Fields
- Mike Servito (US)
- Last Dinosaurs
- Thelma Plum
- Trophy Eyes
- Harvey Sutherland – DJ set
- K.Flay (US)
- Sam Fender (UK)
- Slaves (UK) — only Australian show
- Pub Choir
- Seb Wildblood (UK)
- The Beths (New Zealand)
- Set Mo
- Hatchie
- Honne (UK)
- Kwame
- The Nude Party (US)
- Nathan Micay (Germany)
- Slowly Slowly
- Psychedelic Porn Crumpets
- Kian
- Kenji Takimi (Japan)
- Dear Seattle
- Charly Bliss (US)
- Kaiit
- Phony Ppl (US)
- A.Swayze and the Ghosts
- The Midnight (US)
- Channel Tres (US)
- Pist Idiots
- ~~MorMor (Canada)~~ (Note: MorMor withdrew from the lineup due to unspecified reasons. He was replaced with Spacey Jane.)
- Spacey Jane
- Suzanne Kraft (Netherlands)
- Erthlings
- Telephones (Norway)
- Moaning Lisa
- Thandi Phoenix
- DJ Jnett
- Wax'o Paradiso
- Andy Garvey
- Tyne-James Organ
- Lastlings
- Merve
- Jennifer Loveless (Germany)
- Noise In My Head
- Skin On Skin
- Rebel Yell
- Triple J Unearthed Friday
- Triple J Unearthed Saturday
- Ninajirachi
- Body Promise
- Donald's House
- Casual Connection
- DJ Klasik
- Close Encounters – DJ set
- Merph
- Dameeeela
- Lex Deluxe

=== 2020 and 2021 ===
The 20th anniversary edition of the festival was originally scheduled for 24–26 July 2020. Due to the COVID–19 pandemic, however, it was rescheduled several times – first to 23–25 October 2020, then to 23–25 July 2021, then to 19–21 November 2021, and finally to 22–24 July 2022.

On 1 December 2021, the lineup for the 2022 edition of the festival was released.

=== 2022 ===
==== Friday, 22 July ====
Note: Artists in italics were not originally announced for the 2020 edition of the festival.

- Gorillaz (UK) (Note: On 13 July 2020 the organisers announced that Gorillaz would be replacing Flume as the headliner for the Friday night, while The Strokes and Tyler, The Creator would be appearing as previously scheduled.)
- The Avalanches
- ~~Yeah Yeah Yeahs (US)~~
- Kacey Musgraves (US)
- DMA's
- Dillon Francis (US)
- YUNGBLUD (UK)
- Ruel
- Jungle (UK)
- Orville Peck (US)
- Cub Sport
- Sofi Tukker (US)
- Baker Boy
- Still Woozy (US)
- Hooligan Hefs
- Joy Crookes (UK)
- Confidence Man
- Maxo Kream (US)
- Rolling Blackouts Coastal Fever
- Wet Leg (UK)
- Miiesha
- Sly Withers
- Starcrawler (US)
- ~~Mako Road (New Zealand)~~
- Renforshort (Canada)
- MAY-A
- Flowerkid
- Fazerdaze (New Zealand)
- George Alice
- The Buoys
- 1300
- Dena Amy
- Luen
- Aywy

==== Saturday, 23 July 2022 ====
- The Strokes (US)
- Glass Animals (UK)
- Violent Soho
- Tim Minchin
- Jack Harlow (US)
- The Jungle Giants
- Oliver Tree (US)
- ~~Tom Misch (UK)~~
- Cosmo's Midnight
- Ruby Fields
- JPEGMafia (US)
- Methyl Ethel
- Stella Donnelly
- The Chats
- Biig Piig (Ireland)
- Chillinit
- Triple One
- PUP (Canada)
- Tai Verdes (US)
- Myd (France) – DJ set
- ~~Hinds (Spain)~~
- Noah Dillon
- Alice Ivy
- Budjerah
- Mildlife
- Jarreau Vandal (Netherlands)
- Brame & Hamo (Ireland)
- ~~Adrian Eagle~~
- Tasman Keith
- The Lazy Eyes
- Banoffee
- Moktar
- Stevan
- Dro Carey & DJ Scorpion
- PRICIE
- Pink Matter
- Memphis LK – DJ set
- Jordan Brando
- Honey Point
- Carolina Gasolina

notes

- Tom Misch and Hinds withdrew from the lineup two days before the festival's start and were replaced by Cosmo's Midnight and Noah Dillon.

==== Sunday, 24 July 2022 ====
- Tyler, the Creator (US)
- Liam Gallagher (UK)
- Duke Dumont (Live) (UK)
- Mura Masa (UK)
- Amyl and the Sniffers
- Aitch (UK)
- G Flip
- Grinspoon
- Parquet Courts (US)
- Tierra Whack (US)
- Julia Stone
- Pond
- Genesis Owusu
- ~~Surfaces (US)~~
- Holly Humberstone (UK)
- Alex the Astronaut
- Bad//Dreems
- Northeast Party House
- Mo'Ju
- Shannon & the Clams (US)
- Babe Rainbow
- The Snuts (UK)
- Sycco
- Dayglow (US)
- JK-47
- JEFF the Brotherhood (US)
- Big Twisty & The Funknasty
- The Soul Movers
- King Stingray
- Mylee Grace
- ~~Tom Cardy~~
- Mickey Kojack
- Andy Golledge
- Charlie Collins
- Shantan Wantan Ichiban
- AK Sports
- Munasib

Notes

- Tom Cardy withdrew from the lineup due to personal issues and was replaced by Big Twisty & The Funknasty
- Surfaces, Mako Road, and Adrian Eagle withdrew from the lineup and were replaced by Pond and Tasman Keith
- Yeah Yeah Yeahs withdrew from the lineup due to illness and were replaced by The Avalanches

The following artists were originally announced as part of the line-up for the 2020 edition of the festival, but were not included in the 2022 line-up most likely due to scheduling conflicts.

==== 24 July 2020 ====
- Flume
- Midnight Oil
- King Krule (UK)
- Petit Biscuit (FRA)
- Illy
- Julia Jacklin
- Wallows (US)
- Bruno Major (UK)
- Inhaler (IRE)
- Gryffin (US)
- Muna (US)
- 100
- Miss June (New Zealand)

==== 25 July 2020 ====
- Dom Dolla
- King Princess (US)
- Thelma Plum
- Mall Grab (UK)
- Grouplove (US)
- Kllo
- Shaed (US)
- The Big Moon (UK)
- Greentea Peng (UK)
- Lex Deluxe

26 July 2020

- Denzel Curry (US)
- Idles (UK)
- Sampa the Great
- Gerry Cinnamon (UK)
- Jack Garratt (UK)
- Lime Cordiale
- Jack River
- Benee (New Zealand)
- Georgia (UK)
- Cry Club
- Sauti Systems
- Lillie Mae (US)

=== 2023 ===
==== 21 July ====
- Lizzo (US)
- ~~Lewis Capaldi (UK)~~
- J Balvin (COL)
- Ocean Alley
- Danny Brown (US) Exclusive
- ~~Slowthai (UK)~~
- Ball Park Music
- Ruel
- 070 Shake (US)
- Hooligan Hefs
- Loyle Carner (UK)
- Skegss
- Sudan Archives (US)
- Palace (UK)
- Cub Sport
- Jack River
- Claire Rosinkranz (US)
- MAY-A
- RVG
- Gali (CHN)
- Gold Fang
- MILKU
- Sumner
- William Crighton
- Tseba
- FOURA
- Mowgli

==== 22 July ====
- Flume Exclusive
- Yeah Yeah Yeahs (US)
- Sam Fender (UK)
- Little Simz (UK)
- Arlo Parks (UK)
- King Gizzard & the Lizard Wizard
- Benee (New Zealand)
- Marlon Williams (New Zealand)
- Peach PRC
- Tkay Maidza
- Pussy Riot (RUS)
- X CLUB.
- Meg Mac
- Jeremy Zucker (US) Exclusive
- Telenova
- Sly Withers
- KayCyy (US)
- Teenage Dads
- Automatic (US)
- Shag Rock
- BIG WETT
- Mia Wray
- Hellcat Speedracer
- Crybaby
- Caucasian Opportunities
- DJ Macaroni

==== 23 July ====
- Mumford & Sons (UK) Exclusive
- Hilltop Hoods
- Idles (UK)
- Tove Lo (Sweden)
- 100 gecs (US) Exclusive
- Pnau
- Iann Dior (US)
- Thelma Plum
- ~~Rainbow Kitten Surprise (US)~~
- Dune Rats
- Noah Cyrus (US)
- The Smith Street Band
- Lastlings
- Young Franco
- The Vanns
- JamesJamesJames
- Vallis Alps
- Balming Tiger (KOR)
- Harvey Sutherland
- Del Water Gap (US)
- Royel Otis
- Memphis LK
- Forest Claudette
- Full Flower Moon Band
- Latifa Tee
- Luen
- Crescendoll
- Slowthai's Australian tour was cancelled due to being charged with sexual assault in his native England. He was replaced by Danny Brown
- Rainbow Kitten Surprise cancelled their entire 2023 tour, including their appearance at Splendour in the Grass, due to one of the band members having a "medical crisis". They were replaced by Thelma Plum
- Lewis Capaldi cancelled most of his 2023 tour dates, including his appearance at Splendour in the Grass, for health reasons. He was replaced by Ocean Alley

=== 2024 ===
This edition was cancelled in March 2024.

==== 19 July ====
- Kylie Exclusive
- G Flip
- Turnstile (US) Exclusive
- Tash Sultana
- Omar Apollo (US)
- Angie McMahon
- Viagra Boys (Sweden)
- ISOxo (US)
- Confidence Man
- Otoboke Beaver (Japan)
- Allday
- A.B. Original
- Yard Act (UK)
- Teen Jesus and the Jean Teasers
- JK-47
- Leisure (New Zealand)
- Kita Alexander
- Skeleten
- Radio Free Alice
- Becca Hatch
- Nick Ward
- dameeeela
- Baschoe
- Reenie
- Anthony Pappa
- Wongo
- Morgazmk
- Miles Jackson
- Arya
- Data Roaming
- K Dizzy

==== 20 July ====
- Future (US) Exclusive
- Yeat (US)
- Hayden James
- Fontaines D.C. (Ireland) Exclusive
- Lizzy McAlpine (US)
- Tones and I
- The Last Dinner Party (UK)
- The Presets DJ Set
- Pond
- BoyWithUke (US)
- Middle Kids
- Beddy Rays
- SWIM
- Coco & Clair Clair (US)
- Michael Marcagi (US)
- Floodlights
- RONA.
- The Dreggs
- Teenage Joans
- Good Neighbours (UK)
- Rum Jungle
- Willo
- Miss Kaninna
- Logan
- NayNay
- Naycab
- Grouch (New Zealand)
- MARNiE
- Megapixel
- Ish K
- SophDexx
- LuciDream
- JustTim
- Camila Rosa

==== 21 July ====
- Arcade Fire (Canada)
- Girl in Red (Norway)
- Baby Gravy (Yung Gravy x bbno$) (US/Canada)
- Royel Otis
- DJ Seinfeld (Sweden) Exclusive
- The Kills (UK/US)
- TV Girl (US)
- Thelma Plum
- Fletcher (US)
- Polaris
- Eyedress (Philippines)
- Sofia Kourtesis (Peru)
- Sam Alfred
- Pacific Avenue
- Erika de Casier (Denmark)
- Grentperez
- Danny Ocean (Venezuela)
- Old Mervs
- Paris Paloma (UK)
- 6 Sense
- Jhassic & Rakish
- The Slingers
- Vv Pete
- The Belair Lip Bombs
- Jhassic & Rakish
- Bria
- Opiuo (New Zealand)
- Godlands
- Käse Kochen
- Grouch in Dub (New Zealand)
- April Kerry
- Surge
- Crooks
- Farfetch'd
- Smish
- Wren
