= Village Sounds Agency =

Australian booking agency

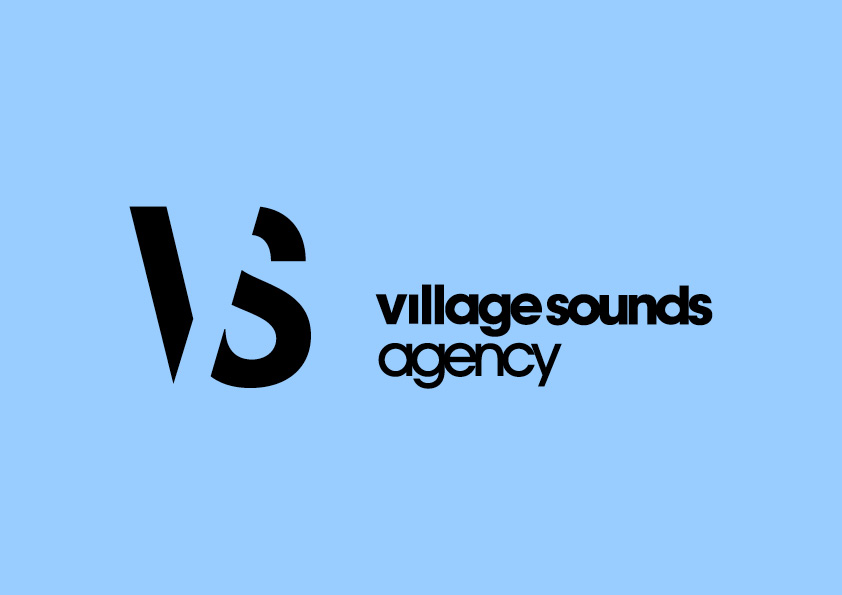
- Industry: Talent and Literary Agencies
- Founder: Jessica Ducrou
- Key people: Evan Davis; Andy Gumley; Jolie Kelly; Sam Perovich; Mel Yong
- Parent: Secret Sounds
- Website: https://villagesounds.com/

Village Sounds Agency is an Australian booking agency that represents the live touring of Australasian artists.

== Background & Agency Growth ==
Founded in 1999 by Powderfinger booking agent Jessica Ducrou, the agency has grown to have offices in Byron Bay, Sydney & Melbourne. Ducrou started in the music industry working at Rolling Stone Magazine and later booking the Lansdowne Hotel in Sydney. Prior to starting Village Sounds Agency, in 1996 Ducrou founded Homebake festival in partnership with International Music Concepts (IMC) with a debut lineup that included Grinspoon, Silverchair, Spiderbait and more.

In 2001, Ducrou and Paul Piticco co-founded the annual Byron Bay festival Splendour in the Grass to give Powderfinger a platform to perform on. Village Sounds was the primary presenter of Splendour in the Grass from 2001 to 2016, when the company merged with Secret Sounds.

In 2008, Evan Davis of The Harbour Agency joined Village Sounds Agency and was subsequently named in The Music Network’s 30 Under 30 in 2010.

In 2016, Village Sounds Agency was brought under the umbrella of Secret Sounds which consists of Splendour in the Grass, Falls Music & Arts Festival, Secret Sounds Touring, Secret Service Artist Management, Dew Process, Create/Control, Dew Process Publishing, Secret Sounds Brand Partnerships, Whole Lot of Love, and Secret Service Public Relations.

In 2016, Jessica Ducrou and Paul Piticco were named #2 in The Music’s annual Power 50, listing the top 50 most powerful people in the Australian Music Industry.

== Artist Roster ==
As of July 2018, Village Sounds represents the careers of:

- 360
- Airling
- ALTA
- Ara Koufax
- Art vs Science
- The Babe Rainbow
- Bad//Dreems
- Bernard Fanning
- Big Scary
- Birds of Tokyo
- Cameron Avery
- CC:DISCO!
- Christopher Port
- Cloud Control
- Courtney Barnett
- Cub Sport
- The Creases
- DMA’S
- DRELLER
- DRO CAREY
- Dune Rats
- Fascinator
- Fazerdaze
- Fractures
- G Flip
- The Grates
- Green Buzzard
- Gyroscope
- Hatchie
- Hockey Dad
- Illy
- Jarrow
- The Kite String Tangle
- Last Dinosaurs
- The Living End
- Mansionair
- Megan Washington
- The Mess Hall
- Methyl Ethel
- Moohki
- No Mono
- Obscura Hail
- Ocean Grove
- Oh Pep!
- PEZ
- Seekae
- Super Cruel
- Totally Mild
- Touch Sensitive
- Tropical Fuck Storm
- Vallis Alps
- Vance Joy
- Violent Soho
- Wafia
- Ziggy Ramo
