= Lapslie =

Lapslie is a surname. Notable people with the surname include:

- George Lapslie (born 1997), English footballer
- James Lapslie (1750–1824), Scottish minister and historian
- Tom Lapslie (born 1995), English footballer

== See also ==
- Lapsley
