= Jean-Paul Fung =

Australian musical artist

- Born: 6 November 1988 (age 37)
- Occupations: Songwriter, producer, mixer, musician
- Instruments: Piano, guitar, bass guitar, drums

Jean-Paul Fung (born 6 November 1988) is an Australian producer, mixer, musician and songwriter who has worked on multiple award-winning records.

Fung learned how to play the piano, guitar, bass guitar and drums at a young age. Throughout his teenage years he played in punk rock, hardcore and folk music bands.

In November 2009, at the now-defunct BJB Studios, Fung was hired as in-house assistant by Australian producer Scott Horscroft. He was later promoted to in-house audio engineer, shortly followed by in-house producer.

Following the closure of BJB Studios in September 2011, Fung moved to freelance work.

In late 2010, he produced and engineered a single for young Brisbane band Last Dinosaurs. Their single Time & Place has received high rotation on Triple J. In 2011, the band again worked with Fung on their debut full-length album In A Million Years, which debuted at No. 8 on ARIA Charts and No. 2 on ARIA digital charts.

In 2013 Jean-Paul signed a publishing deal with Alberts, later bought out by BMG.

Fung's production credits include Theophilus London, Cold Chisel, Silverchair, Birds of Tokyo, Jet, Bluejuice, Josh Pyke, Die! Die! Die!, Art vs. Science, Little Red, Leader Cheetah, Phrase, Drapht, 360, Mahalia Barnes, Last Dinosaurs, My Disco, Guineafowl, Jinja Safari, Snakadaktal and Papa Vs Pretty.

2018 Onwards

More recently, he has worked with Andy Black, Ivy Levan and AViVA.
