= Yumeno Garden =

Studio album by Last Dinosaurs
- Released: 5 October 2018
- Genre: Indie rock, dance-punk, Synth-pop
- Length: 37:07
- Label: Dew Process, Universal Music Australia
- Producer: Self-produced, with assistance from Jean-Paul Fung

Last Dinosaurs chronology
Wellness (2015)	Yumeno Garden (2018)	From Mexico with Love (2022)

Singles from Yumeno Garden
- 1. "Dominos" Released: 21 February 2018; 2. "Eleven" Released: 5 July 2018

Professional ratings
Review scores
Source	Rating
Isolated Nation	5/5

Yumeno Garden is the third studio album by Australian indie rock band, Last Dinosaurs. The album was released on October 5, 2018, through Dew Process. Yumeno Garden debuted at number 26 in the Australian ARIA Charts. It's the group's first entirely self-produced album, opting to write, record, and mix in their own studios using consumer equipment and recording software wherever possible, with some guidance from Jean-Paul Fung.

== Track listing ==
No.	Title	Length
1.	"Eleven"	3:26
2.	"Dominos"	3:30
3.	"Bass God"	4:01
4.	"Sense"	4:19
5.	"Happy"	3:40
6.	"Forget About"	3:47
7.	"Italo Disco"	3:46
8.	"Everything Relative"	3:16
9.	"Shallow Boy"	3:21
10.	"Non Lo So"	4:01
Total length:		37:07

== Charts ==
Chart (2018)	Peak position
Australian Albums (ARIA)	26
