= Lennoxtown =

Town in East Dunbartonshire, Scotland

Coordinates: 55.974°N 4.206°W

Lennoxtown: Scottish Gaelic: Baile Leamhnachd; Scots: Lennoxtoon
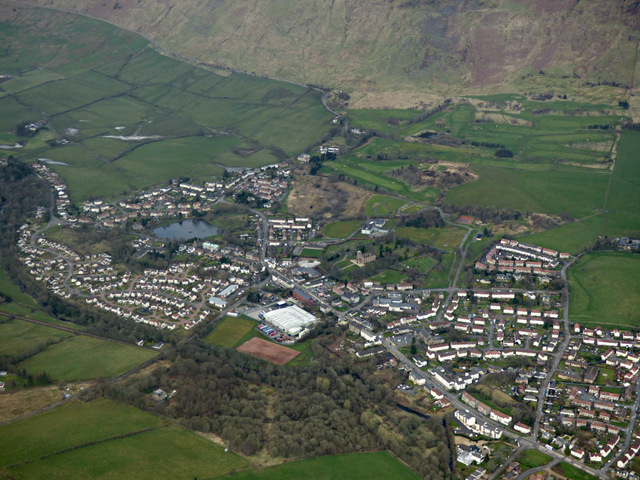
- Lennoxtown from the air

- Location within East Dunbartonshire
- Population: 4,260 (2020)
- OS grid reference: NS625775
- Council area: East Dunbartonshire
- Lieutenancy area: Dunbartonshire
- Country: Scotland
- Sovereign state: United Kingdom
- Post town: GLASGOW
- Postcode district: G65 G66
- Dialling code: 01360
- Police: Scotland
- Fire: Scottish
- Ambulance: Scottish
- UK Parliament: Mid Dunbartonshire (UK Parliament constituency)
- Scottish Parliament: Strathkelvin and Bearsden

Lennoxtown (Scottish Gaelic: Baile Leamhnachd, pronounced [ˈpalə nə ˈʎãũnəxk]) is a town in the East Dunbartonshire council area and the historic county of Stirlingshire, Scotland. The Campsie Fells are located to Lennoxtown's north. The town had a population of 4,094 at the 2011 UK census.

== History ==
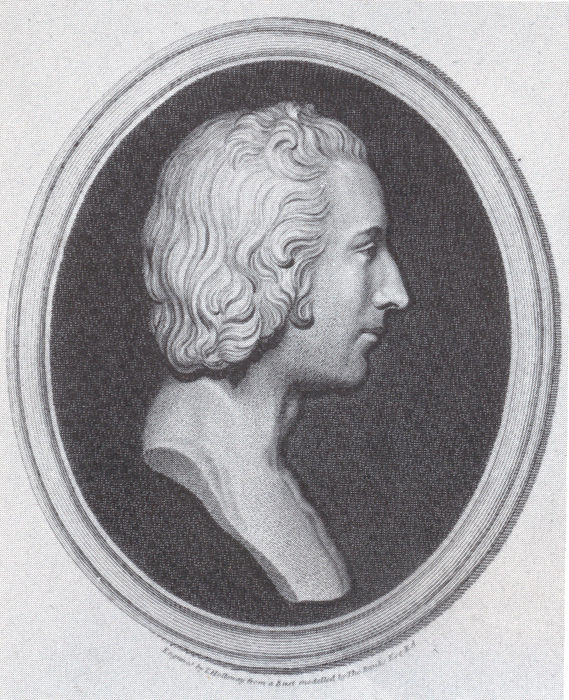
Thomas Muir

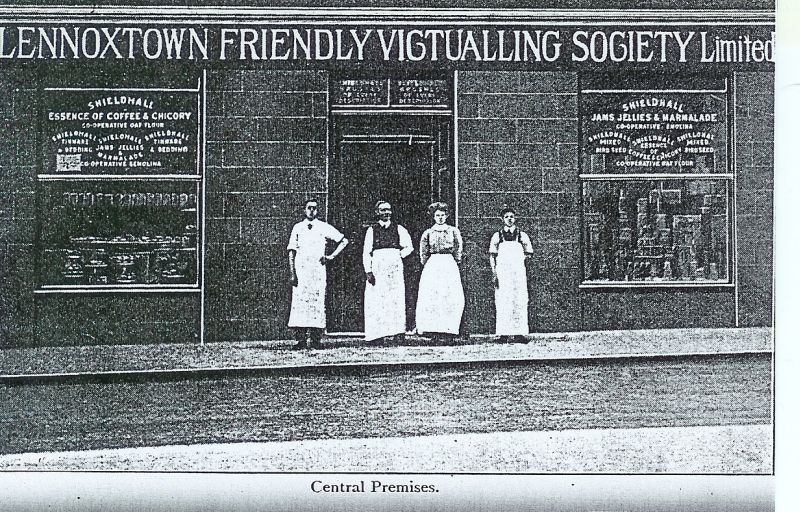
Lennoxtown Friendly Victualling Society

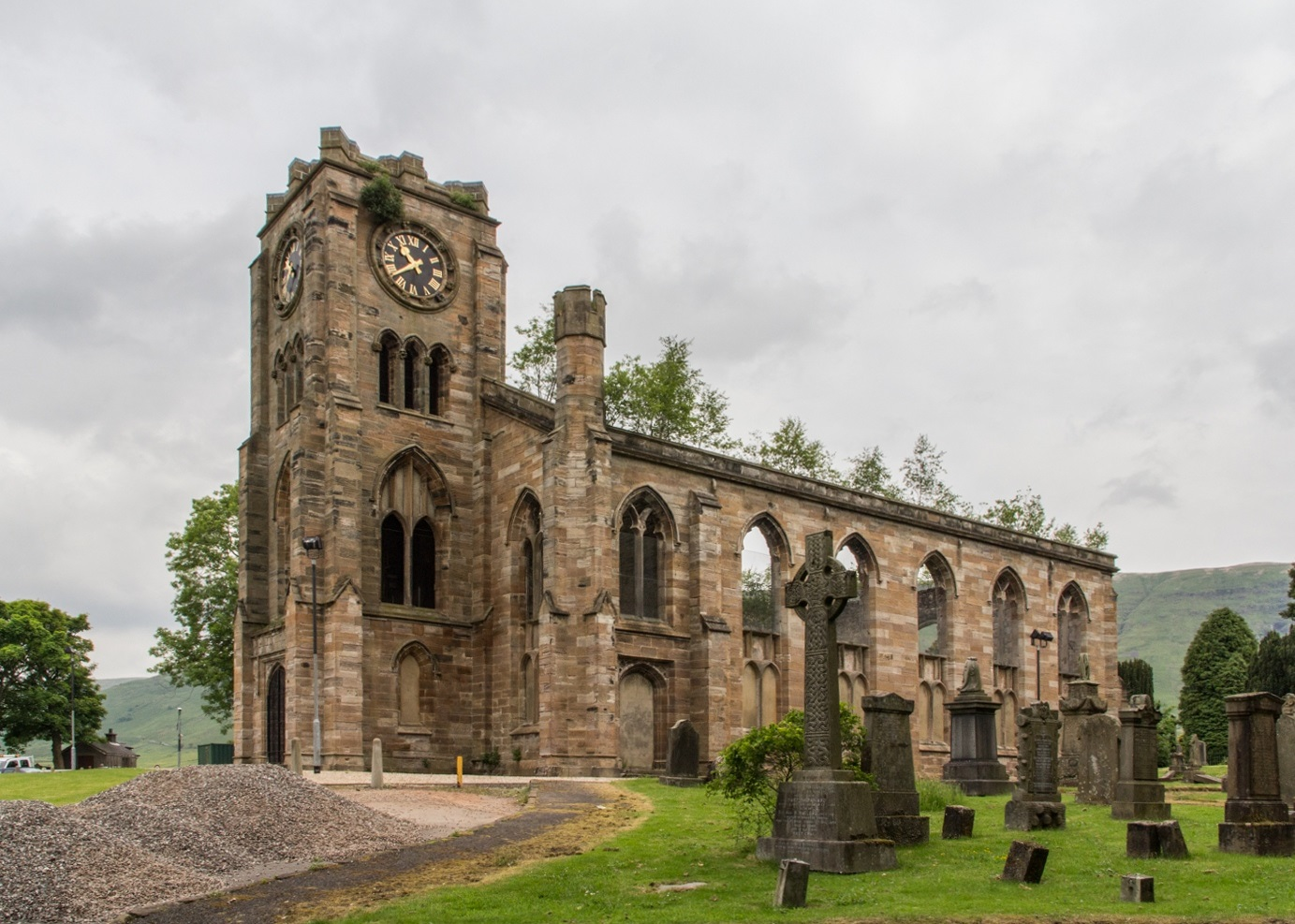
Lennoxtown church, built in the 1820s

The Lennoxtown area was centred around Lennox Mill in the past. It was a bustling location where tenants of the Woodhead estate used to bring their corn for grinding. Numerous corn mills existed in the area, including Lennox Mill which was situated near the now since-demolished Kali Nail Works.

A significant event in the history of the locality was the establishment of the calico printing works at Lennoxmill during the late 1780s. It was on a site adjacent to the old corn mill. Calico is a type of cotton cloth, the printing of cotton cloth was soon established as the major industry in the area, also at Milton of Campsie. Calico was constructed during the late eighteenth and early nineteenth centuries to provide accommodation for the block makers and other cotton printing workers in the village of Lennoxtown. Streets of houses were planned and built according to a formal plan. Lennoxtown was at first known as 'Newtown of Campsie', to distinguish it from the 'Kirktoun' or 'Clachan' of Campsie, at the foot of Campsie Glen.

During the 19th century Lennoxtown grew to be the largest centre of population in Campsie Parish. Another important industry was soon established – a chemical works, founded by Charles Macintosh (of waterproof clothing fame) and his associates. At first, their principal product was alum, a chemical employed in the textile industry. Alumschist, the basic ingredient in the process, was mined in the area. The works came to be known as the Secret Works, presumably because of the need to keep the industrial processes undercovered.

During the 1790s many of the Lennoxmill workers supported the political reformer Thomas Muir of Huntershill in his campaigns to establish democracy in Scotland. Furthermore, Reform Society was set up in Campsie in 1792. However, the parish minister, the Rev. James Lapslie, represented some opposition to Muir's ideas in the area. An important milestone democracy timeline was the establishment of the local co-operative society in 1812, The Lennoxtown Friendly Victualling Society. It was one of the earliest of its kind in Scotland.

The growing importance of Lennoxtown was underlined by the removal of the parish church from the Clachan to the New Town during the 1820s. Plans for the new church were prepared by the architect David Hamilton, who was also responsible for the nearby Lennox Castle. A Roman Catholic church was erected in 1846 (originally St Paul's, later renamed St Machan's), one of the earliest post-Reformation Catholic churches in Scotland, apart from those in cities and large towns.

The decline of the industries that flourished during the nineteenth century in addition to the later nail-making industry (and indeed the famous Victualling Society) has left Lennoxtown in a kind of post-industrial limbo. Which it has been difficult to escape from, slow progress continued to be made.

== Primary schools ==
=== St Machan's ===
St Machan's Primary School was opened in 1964, replacing a smaller school on Bencloich Road. The old building was then used as the Campsie Recreation Centre, until its demolition in 2009. In 2009, St Machan's had 200 pupils. It is a feeder school for St Ninian's High School in Kirkintilloch. In 2009, St Machan's had 200 pupils enrolled in the school and would later move on to St Ninian's High School which enrolled 757 pupils in 2009. In 2013, there was a petition to get a skate park to replace the old recreation center was handed out to the local businesses to get members of the local community to sign.

=== Lennoxtown Primary School ===
In 1839, the Lennoxtown New Subscription School was given a grant of £280,000 from the government in order to be rebuilt. The school was made up of two large buildings and opened in 1840. It had a section for over one hundred primary age pupils and another section for infant pupils. A new school was built in 1896 and expanded to seven classrooms for 458 pupils. The Lennoxtown Public School was reduced to the status of Lennoxtown Primary School in 1963, with secondary pupils instead attending Kilsyth Academy. The feeder school has since been changed again to Lenzie Academy. Lennoxtown Primary enrolled 127 pupils in 2024.

== The Community Hub ==
In 2016, a Community Hub was opened on Main Street to focus on the delivery of public services. It brought together the existing East Dunbartonshire Library, the NHS Clinic which contained a dental practice and GP consulting rooms, and the Housing office in one building. One of the oldest surviving branches of the Co-operative was demolished as part of the development after an attempt to have the building listed was unsuccessful.

== Lennoxtown Railway ==
The railway to Lennoxtown was an extension of the Glasgow to Edinburgh line. The first 5 1/2 miles (9 kilometres) of this line, from Lenzie to Lennoxtown, were built by the Edinburgh and Glasgow railway under powers obtained in 1845 and was officially opened on 5 July 1848. The railway was initially intended to serve the print fields at Lennoxtown but it eventually allowed passengers and provided this service as far as Aberfoyle. The passenger service was discontinued in October 1951, with the transportation of goods continuing but only as far as Lennoxtown from 1959. The line closed completely in 1966. Lennoxtown Station won first prize for being the best-kept railway station in Scotland in 1897, for 7 consecutive years from 1922 to 1928 and again in 1930 and 1931.

== Lennoxtown Training Centre ==
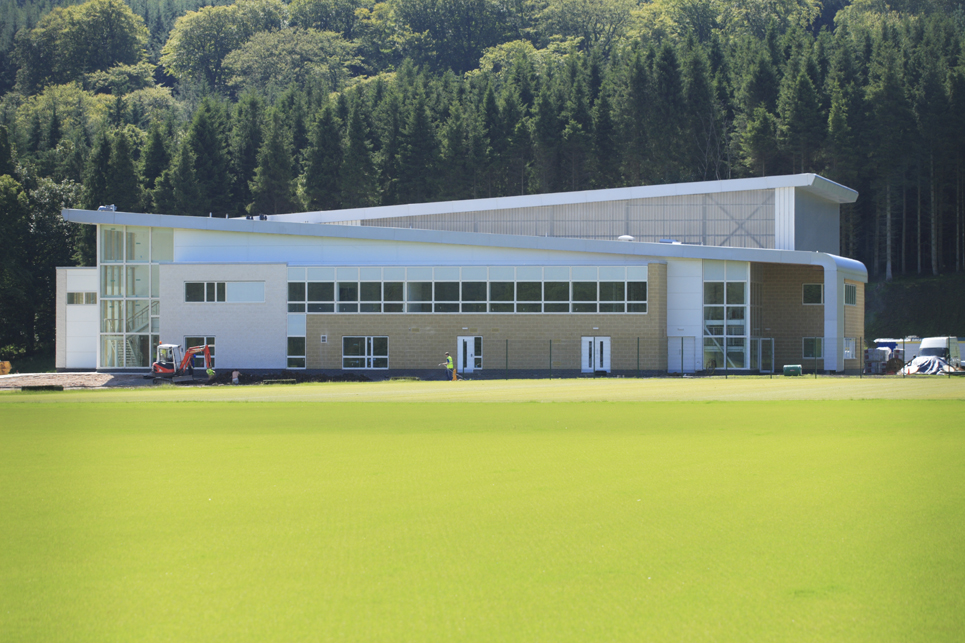
The training centre in 2007

It was announced that the Celtic training ground was going to be built in Lennoxtown in 2005 by the manager Gordon Strachan. The 20-hectare (50-acre) training ground was built on the grounds of Lennox castle and was officially opened in October 2007. The facility has three natural grass, UEFA match-size pitches, and one full-size, all-weather, floodlit artificial pitch. There is undersoil heating, a state-of-the-art gym, a sauna and steam room, and changing facilities.

Local football teams such as the Campsie Boys' Club train there once a week. Celtic liaise with the local schools (St. Machan's and Lennoxtown Primary School) to allow occasional use of their training facilities. There are educational facilities for the young Celtic Academy footballers at the ground and arrangements for them to attend St.Ninian's High School in Kirkintilloch. The school football team use the training ground facilities. Stuart Findlay was part of the initial intake of this scheme in 2009 before leaving Celtic and establishing himself as a professional with Kilmarnock.

== Town hall ==
The construction of a town hall began in 1866 and was completed in 1868. The total cost of building was £1,340, which would be equivalent to over £120,000 in today’s currency. It is currently known as the Campsie Memorial Hall.

In the 1950s, the District Council took over and renovated the hall.

The Campsie Memorial Hall was threatened with closure in 2010. Due to a positive local response, the hall was spared. Over 150 people attended a public meeting in a bid to rescue the hall. Around 35 residents formed a management committee to manage the hall. The hall was managed by volunteers from Lennoxtown in late 2012. In 2013, grants from the EDC Civic Pride Fund and the Big Lottery funded improvements.

== Football ==
The town's first senior association football club, Campsie Glen, entered the Scottish Cup for the first time in 1878–79. Two other clubs from the town reached the Cup quarter-final in the 1880s; Central in 1880–81 and Campsie in 1888–89. Campsie also won the Stirlingshire Cup in 1892–93, the first club from the west of the county to do so.

The town was well known in Scottish football circles as the home of Campsie Black Watch FC, an under-21 club founded in 1943 which launched the careers of many professional players (Willie Garner, Eddie Gallagher, Johnny Walker, Frank Haffey, Mike Larnach, Jim Thomson). The club won the Scottish Juvenile Cup 11 times between 1955 and 2014 before eventually folding in 2017, a short time before the death of long-serving president Gerry Marley.

== Notable people connected with Lennoxtown ==
- Tam Baillie, Scotland's Commissioner for Children and Young People between 2009 and 2017.
- Robert Dalglish, Provost of Glasgow, merchant and calico printer.
- Alex Ferns, actor, born 13 October 1968.
- Lulu, singer (real name Marie McDonald McLaughlin Lawrie), born Lennox Castle Hospital, 3 November 1948.
- Drew McAdam, mentalist and mindreader, born Lennoxtown, 4 June 1955.
- Sir Ian McCartney, Former Government Minister and Chair of the Labour Party, born 25 April 1951.
- Jim McGinlay, Bass guitar player with bands Salvation and Slik, born Lennox Castle Hospital, 9 March 1949
- Thomas McGraw, gangster and criminal.
- Owen 'Onnie' McIntyre, musician with Average White Band, born Lennox Castle Hospital, 25 September 1949
- Ted McKenna, drummer with The Sensational Alex Harvey Band, born 10 March 1950.
- John McLane, Governor of New Hampshire (1905–07).
- Kirsty Milne, broadcaster and journalist.
- Bishop Ian Murray (1932-2016), Roman Catholic Bishop Emeritus of the Diocese of Argyll and the Isles, Scotland.
- Billy Rankin, musician and broadcaster, born Lennox Castle Hospital, 25 April 1959.
- John Young (1823–1900) - geologist and museum curator

=== Footballers ===
- Jack Britton, born 1900
- John Brown, born 1962
- John Hendrie, born 1963
- John Johnston, born 1878
- Denis Lawson, born 1897
- Alan Mackin, born 1955
- John McLaughlin, born 1936
- Bill Millar, born 1950 (played for Canada)
- Sandy Pate, born 1944
- Ricky Sbragia, born 1956
