= In a Million Years =

Studio album by Last Dinosaurs
- Released: 2 March 2012
- Recorded: 2010–2012
- Studio: BJB Studios, Sydney, Australia
- Genre: Indie rock, dance-punk
- Length: 42:52
- Label: Dew Process, Universal Music Australia
- Producer: Jean-Paul Fung

Last Dinosaurs chronology
Back from the Dead (2010)	In a Million Years (2012)	Wellness (2015)

Singles from In a Million Years
- 1. "Honolulu" Released: 21 April 2010; 2. "Time & Place" Released: 4 February 2011; 3. "Zoom" Released: 15 November 2011; 4. "Andy" Released: 6 June 2012; 5. "I Can't Help You" Released: 12 November 2012; 6. "Weekend" Released: 3 February 2013

In a Million Years is the debut studio album by Australian indie rock band, Last Dinosaurs. The album was released on 2 March 2012 by Dew Process. It serves as the follow-up of their debut EP, Back from the Dead (2010). The album's title was announced after the release of their second single, "Zoom". The album debuted at number 8 in the Australian Albums Chart.

== Reception ==
Professional ratings
Review scores
Source	Rating
The AU Review	9.8/10
iTunes Store	4.5/5 stars
Sputnikmusic	4/5 stars

The album received critical acclaim upon release. Davey Boy from Sputnikmusic summarize his review, "Aussie indie-pop that uses influences from practically every continent." Andrew Wade of The AU Review said "The album is a surprisingly mature and cohesive collection of songs. With incredibly slick production and the catchiest songs you’ll hear this side of 2000, In A Million Years is a strong contender for the best Australian album of the past twenty years." The album also received an average 5/5 user rating on both Triple J's User Review and iTunes User Ratings. "Andy" was also placed at No. 95 in the Triple J Hottest 100 in 2012.

== Track listing ==
CD
No.	Title	Length
1.	"Zoom"	4:00
2.	"I Can't Help You"	3:49
3.	"Sunday Night"	3:55
4.	"Time & Place"	3:17
5.	"Andy"	3:49
6.	"Satellites"	1:47
7.	"Weekend"	4:16
8.	"I Can't Decide"	3:18
9.	"Used to be Mine"	5:29
10.	"Honolulu"	4:11
11.	"Repair"	5:01
Total length:		42:52

Australian bonus tracks
No.	Title	Length
12.	"Time & Place" (Japanese version)	3:17

iTunes version
No.	Title	Length
12.	"Beaux-Mont*"	3:15
13.	"Zoom" (music video)	4:00

== Charts ==
Chart (2012)	Peak position
Australian Albums (ARIA)	8

== Credits ==
Band

- Sean Caskey - vocals, guitar
- Lachlan Caskey - lead guitar
- Sam Gethin-Jones - bass guitar, backing vocals
- Dan Koyama - drums, percussion
- A. Julca - maracas

Production

- Jean-Paul Fung – producer, engineer, musician, mix engineer*
- Eliot James – mix engineer
- Stu McCullough – management
- Dan Koyama – art director
