= Wellness (album) =

Studio album by Last Dinosaurs
- Released: 28 August 2015
- Recorded: December 2014—May 2015
- Studios: The Grove Studios, Somersby, Australia
- Genres: Indie rock, dance-punk, synth-pop
- Length: 36:42
- Labels: Dew Process, Universal Music Australia
- Producer: Scott Horscroft

Last Dinosaurs chronology
| In a Million Years (2012) | Wellness (2015) | Yumeno Garden (2018) |

Singles from Wellness
- 1. "Evie" Released: 1 May 2015; 2. "Apollo" Released: 13 July 2015

Professional ratings
Review scores
| Source | Rating |
|---|---|
| The Interns | 8/10 |
| Best Before | 6.8/10 |

Wellness is the second studio album by Australian indie rock band, Last Dinosaurs. The album was released on August 28, 2015, through Dew Process, and was announced alongside the album's second single, "Apollo", on April 30, 2015. Wellness debuted at number 18 in the Australian ARIA Charts.

== Track listing ==
| No. | Title | Length |
|---|---|---|
| 1. | "Take Your Time" | 3:44 |
| 2. | "Evie" | 3:42 |
| 3. | "Karma" | 3:36 |
| 4. | "Wurl" | 4:29 |
| 5. | "Wellness" | 3:33 |
| 6. | "Apollo" | 3:25 |
| 7. | "Always" | 3:38 |
| 8. | "Purist" | 3:38 |
| 9. | "Stream" | 3:51 |
| 10. | "Zero" | 3:06 |
| Total length: | | 36:42 |

== Charts ==
| Chart (2015) | Peak position |
|---|---|
| Australian Albums (ARIA) | 18 |

== Re-recorded release ==
Wxllness

Studio album by Last Dinosaurs
- Released: 13 February 2026
- Genres: Indie rock, dance-punk, synth-pop
- Length: 56:42
- Label: Nettwerk Music Group

Last Dinosaurs chronology
| KYORYU (2024) | Wxllness (2026) |

Singles from Wxllness
- 1. "Kxrma / Dive" Released: 10 October 2025; 2. "Exie / Dead Or Alive" Released: 7 November 2025; 3. "Purxst / Kebabs" Released: 5 December 2025; 4. "Apxllo / Pink Flags" Released: 9 January 2026

In 2026, the band released a re-recorded version of the album titled Wxllness containing 5 additional tracks at the end.

=== Track listing ===
| No. | Title | Length |
|---|---|---|
| 1. | "Take Your Txme" | 3:53 |
| 2. | "Exie" | 3:45 |
| 3. | "Kxrma" | 3:35 |
| 4. | "Wxrl" | 4:38 |
| 5. | "Wellnxss" | 3:32 |
| 6. | "Apxllo" | 3:23 |
| 7. | "Alwxys" | 3:41 |
| 8. | "Purxst" | 3:44 |
| 9. | "Strexm" | 3:56 |
| 10. | "Zxro" | 3:04 |
| 11. | "Dive" | 3:57 |
| 12. | "Dead Or Alive" | 3:09 |
| 13. | "Kebabs" | 4:49 |
| 14. | "Pink Flags" | 3:40 |
| 15. | "Her Mind" | 3:48 |
| Total length: | | 56:42 |

=== Charts ===
| Chart (2026) | Peak position |
|---|---|
| Australian Albums (ARIA) | 53 |
