= Back from the Dead (Last Dinosaurs EP) =

EP by Last Dinosaurs
- Released: 26 February 2010
- Recorded: 2010
- Genre: Indie rock
- Length: 16:12
- Label: Dew Process/Universal Music Australia

Last Dinosaurs chronology
Back from the Dead (2010)	In a Million Years (2012)

Professional ratings
Review scores
Source	Rating
Music Feeds	6.5/10

Back from the Dead is the debut extended play (EP) from Australian indie rock band, Last Dinosaurs, released on 26 February 2010.

== Track listing ==
Back from the Dead track listing
No.	Title	Length
1.	"Honolulu"	4:01
2.	"As Far as You're Concerned"	3:39
3.	"Saturn"	3:20
4.	"Alps"	3:07
5.	"As Far as You're Concerned (Reprise)"	2:05
Total length:		16:12

iTunes version
No.	Title	Length
6.	"School Is So Easy"	2:08
Total length:		18:20

== Charts ==
Chart performance for Back from the Dead
Chart (2010)	Peak position
Australia Physical Singles (ARIA)	3
