= Locked by Land =

Locked By Land

Compilation album by Jinja Safari
- Released: October 28, 2011
- Genres: Indie rock, ambient
- Label: Cooperative Music Australia (ANZ)

Professional ratings
Review scores
Source	Rating
The Brag	link
STACK	link

Locked By Land is a compilation album of the first and second EPs by Australian indie band Jinja Safari. It was released in 2011 on Cooperative Music Australia.

== Track listing ==
1. "Sunken House" - 3:36
2. "Mud" - 3:51
3. "Hiccups" - 3:26
4. "Peter Pan" - 3:23
5. "Moonchild" - 4:44
6. "Families" - 3:26
7. "Stepping Stones" - 4:48
8. "Scarecrow" - 4:25
9. "Vagabond" - 4:11
10. "Head In a Blender" - 3:16
11. "Forest Eyes" - 3:46
12. "Errol Flynn" - 3:36
13. "Mermaids" - 4:54
14. "Peter Pan (Fishing Sandy Pant Remix)" - 3:22
15. "Hiccups (Butcher Blades Ice Cream Nightmare Remix)" - 3:40
