= Drew McAdam =

Scottish mentalist

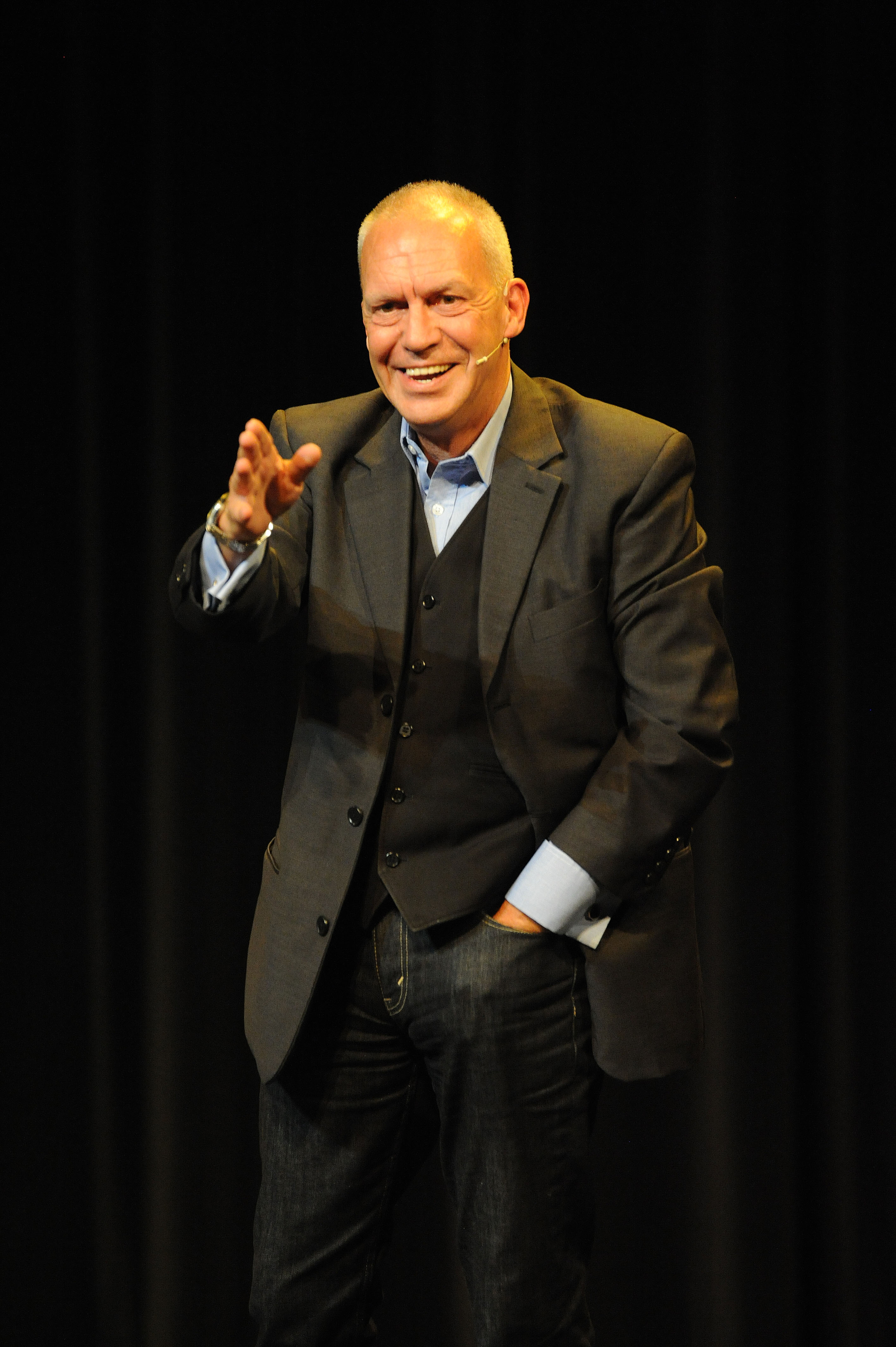
- Born: 4 June 1955 (age 70); Lennoxtown, Stirlingshire, Scotland
- Education: North Berwick High-school
- Occupations: Mentalist, Mindreader, Speaker
- Website: www.drewmcadam.co.uk

Drew McAdam (born 4 June 1955 in Lennoxtown, Stirlingshire) is a Scottish mentalist and mindreader, also known as The Human Lie Detector, speaker and performer of mindplay psychological illusion. He was "The Interrogator" on Channel 5 television show Trisha Goddard and a regular guest on the Scottish Television evening magazine programme The Hour. He was also the subject and part-presenter of the 4-part BBC series School for Genius, and subject of the BBC Brainsmart project for schools.

He has specialized in taking mentalism techniques from the stage and applying them to the fields of education and business management under the title MindBiz.

== Career ==
=== Radio ===
In addition to his regular appearances on local and national radio, Drew was the subject and part-presenter along with BBC presenter Vic Galloway of the BBC series School for Genius in which his techniques in reading of body language, memory systems and psychological persuasion techniques were demonstrated and taught to school children. A spin-off BBC project Brainsmart was aimed at helping school pupils prepare for examinations.

=== Media ===
As a freelance journalist, McAdam is a reviewer of The Edinburgh Evening News. He also wrote the book Making Money From Magic, published by Ian Rowland Ltd. He has a weekly column in both the West Lothian Herald & Post, and the Linlithgow Gazette. His weekly column was published as an anthology in the book Drew's Views (ISBN 978-1-4716-5166-3) McAdam regularly gives seminars and lectures in memory techniques in the joint venture between the BBC and The Scotland Learning initiative in schools.

=== Achievements ===
In the honour of his continuous years of performance, he has been recognised as an ambassador by the Heriot-Watt Magic Society and so they named their annual award, the "McAdam Award".
