= Fort (band) =

- Origin: Byron Bay, Australia
- Genres: Stoner rock
- Years active: 2000–2011
- Website: Fortrock.net

Fort were an Australian stoner/psychedelic/hard rock five-member band from the northern New South Wales coastal town of Byron Bay, Australia.

== History ==
The band formed in 2000 (then known as Forte) as a result of band members' mutual admiration of the 1990s stoner rock band Kyuss. Within their first year they had released their debut EP Tripping in the Vast Exterior. In 2001, they released their second EP Skychaser, followed by expansive touring. Two years later, the band recorded their debut album, In A New Light, at Rocking Horse Studios, situated near Byron Bay .

In the first six years of existence Fort had undertaken national tours with Grinspoon, Fu Manchu, Brant Bjork, Clutch, Nebula, Shihad, Cog and The Black Keys. The band had also taken part in the Splendour in the Grass and Metal for the Brain festivals. A photo taken from their set at Splendour in the Grass is featured as the cover for the EP In A New Light. 2005 saw the band dropping the 'e' from 'Forte' due to confusion in the pronunciation as well as releasing another EP, Never Comin' Down. The band released a 14-track LP featuring tracks from Tripping in the Vast Exterior, In A New Light and Never Comin' Down through Tronador in Brazil.

Their eponymous second LP was recorded at Backbeach Studios with DW Norton and mixed at Rockinghorse with Anthony Lycenko. It was released through MGM Records on 1 September 2007.

The band's Last.fm page mentions they are "taking hiatus" as of January 17, 2010 [and] may never be back". It mentions three members (unspecified) have formed a new project OX and are currently in the process of demoing songs.

Despite this, Fort opened for Kyuss Lives on all their Australian dates in 2011 except for Sydney. The first gig was at the Coolongatta Hotel on 4 May.

== Members ==
- Andy Walker – vocals
- Deon Driver – Drums
- Brent "Badger" Crysell – Bass
- Stu Hume – Guitar
- George Christie – Guitar, backing vocals

=== George Christie ===
George Christie; is the lead guitarist and primary music writer. He cites Jimi Hendrix as his favourite guitarist. George plays a 1975 Guild S100 and various Gibson guitars (1969 Gibson SG and a 1979 Gibson RD Artist) through an array of vintage effects pedals, including multiple wah pedals and dirty, crunchy overdrive helped by two Big Muff pedals. He achieves his trademark stoner sound by running these pedals these through a Mesa Dual Rectifier, which was formerly owned by Kim Thayil of Soundgarden.

== Discography ==
- Tripping in the Vast Exterior (EP) – 2000
- Skychaser (EP) – 2001
- "Deadweight" (single) – 2003
- In A New Light – 2003
- Never Comin' Down (EP) – 2004
- Place in the Sun – 2005 (Brazilian release only)
- Fort – 2007
