= Super Cruel =

Australian electronic music duo

- Origin: Sydney, Australia, Adelaide, Australia
- Genres: Pop; alternative dance; dance; future bass
- Occupations: DJ; Producer
- Years active: 2017–present
- Label: Warner Music Australia (2017-2019)

Super Cruel (stylised in all caps) are an Australian electronic music duo. The pair are from Sydney and Adelaide.

== Career ==
In March 2017, Super Cruel released their debut single “November" featuring Lisa Mitchell. which was followed by the release of "Sicklaced" Featuring Cxloe in November. The video clip for the song features Josh Heuston and Cartia Mallan. They produced an official remix for Major Lazer's 2017 single "Know No Better".

== Touring ==
Super Cruel have performed at festivals such as Spilt Milk and Splendour in the Grass. They toured around Australia with Slumberjack in early 2019.

== Discography ==
=== Singles ===
Year	Title
2017	"November" (featuring Lisa Mitchell)
2017	"Sicklaced" (featuring CXLOE)
2018	"Space" (with The Dolan Twins)
2018	"Me + You" (featuring Hazlett)
2019	"21 Devils" (featuring Ocean Grove)
2019	"Pause" (featuring NYNE)

=== Remixes ===
2017

- Major Lazer Feat. Travis Scott, Camila Cabello & Quavo "Know No Better"

2019

- Charli XCX Feat. Troye Sivan "1999"
