= Vallis Alps =

Australian electronic music duo

- Origin: Canberra, Australia; Seattle, Washington, United States
- Genres: Dance; electronic; pop
- Years active: 2015–present
- Members: David Ansari; Parissa Tosif
- Website: vallisalps.com

Vallis Alps are an electronic music duo based in Sydney, Australia, composed of producer David Ansari and vocalist Parissa Tosif, who are originally from Seattle and Canberra respectively.

== Career ==
=== 2015-2016: Vallis Alps ===
In January 2015, they released the tracks "Young" and "Thru" on Triple J and their first Extended play, Vallis Alps. Following the success of their debut EP, Vallis Alps announced their first Australian tour dates in August 2015, including a performance at Splendour in the Grass in July. The pair moved to Sydney in late 2015. Their 2015 was capped off with a nomination for the J Award for Unearthed Artist of the Year in 2015. "Young" went on to place number 27 on the Triple J Hottest 100, 2015. In November 2016, the duo released a new track titled "Fading". The track placed at number 94 on the Triple J Hottest 100, 2016.

=== 2017-2021: Fable ===
In March 2017, the duo released "East", the lead single from the duo's second EP, Fable.

On 31 August 2017, the duo released a single, "Oceans", which tells the sacrifice women take and is also inspired upon the 19th century Iranian woman Tahirih who fought for women's rights in Iran.

=== 2022-present: Cleave ===
In February 2023, Vallis Alps announced they would release debut album Cleave on 24 August 2023 via The Orchard. The album's third single "Higher Than This" was released on the same day.

== Discography ==
=== Albums ===
List of albums, with selected details
Title	Details
Cleave	Scheduled: 24 August 2023; Label: The Orchard; Formats: Compact disc, digital download

=== Extended plays ===
List of EPs, with selected details
Title	Details
Vallis Alps	Released: 6 January 2015; Label: Self-Released; Formats: Digital download
Fable	Released: 31 March 2017; Label: Vallis Alps; Formats: Digital download
Nothing More Than Human	Released: 26 July 2024; Label: Vallis Alps; Formats: Digital download

=== Certified singles ===
List of certified singles, with selected details
Year	Title	Certifications	Album
2015	"Young"	ARIA: Gold	Vallis Alps

== Awards and nominations ==
=== J Award ===
The J Awards are an annual series of Australian music awards that were established by the Australian Broadcasting Corporation's youth-focused radio station Triple J. They commenced in 2005.

Year	Nominee / work	Award	Result
J Awards of 2015	themselves	Unearthed Artist of the Year	Nominated
