= Gold Fang =

Australian singer and rapper (born c.1998)

- Born: c. 1998 (age 27–28); Trinidad, Trinidad and Tabago
- Genres: Dancehall; hip hop; reggae

Jamunajai Renaud (born c. 1998), better known by his state name Gold Fang, is a Trinidadian-born Australian singer and rapper.

== Biography ==
Renaud was born c. 1998, in Trinidad. His uncle Errol was a member of the band Un Tabu in the 1980s. In 2015, he moved to Sydney. With encouragement from his uncle, he began releasing music during the COVID-19 pandemic. He gained traction in 2021, following a positive Home & Hosed review. Also in 2021, he released "Where Yu From", featuring Big Skeez. In 2022, he opened for Lil Nas X. He is scheduled to make a guest appearance on Djandjay by Baker Boy, releasing October 2025.

== Discography ==
List of albums, with selected details
Title	Details
Smoove Killa	Released: March 2023; Label: NLV Records
