= Jinja Safari =

Australian musical group

- Origin: Central Coast, New South Wales, Australia
- Genres: Indie rock, ambient
- Years active: 2010–2016
- Labels: Cooperative Music Australia (ANZ)
- Members: Marcus Azon; Pepa Knight; Joe Citizen; Alister 'Nugget' Roach; Jacob Borg

Jinja Safari were an Australian indie rock band formed in the Central Coast, New South Wales who drew from "afropop rhythms, (and) tumbling island guitar" to create African-inspired "dreamy folk pop, with a melodic richness comparable to acts like Sufjan Stevens, Animal Collective and Sigur Ros". They were known for their energetic live shows.

== History ==
Formed in 2010, Jinja Safari were initially a duo of Marcus Azon and Pepa Knight. The two met at a beach party on the Central Coast of New South Wales in early 2010.

Pepa lives on the coast, and I live in the city: so we tossed ideas back and forth across email after meeting over a beach campfire party earlier this year. We spent about 4 weekends recording all our ideas at his home studio, where he produced the tracks that we have now, which we're calling 'Forest Rock'. - Marcus Azon (Jinja Safari)

After their first show for friends and family in a coastal forest on the Central Coast of New South Wales on 1 May 2010, Jinja Safari were invited to support Miami Horror at the Manning Bar in Sydney for their first public show.

By June 2010, Jinja Safari had received high rotation airplay on both national Australian broadcaster Triple J and plays on UK's BBC Radio 6 Music. In July 2010 they won the Triple J Unearthed competition, awarding the band a spot at Splendour in the Grass Festival 2010. Jinja Safari's first national Australian tour was supporting Art vs. Science in August 2010.

Jinja Safari spent the majority of 2011 touring Australia, playing sold-out shows in support of their second EP, Mermaids & Other Sirens. The five-track EP was released for free to fans, one song a month over five months. The band also toured Australia with both Boy & Bear and Menomena whilst continuing to be a mainstay at major Australian festivals in 2011, playing Big Day Out, Good Vibrations, Falls Festival in that year. They have been nominated twice for "Best Live Music Act" in the Sydney Music, Arts & Culture Awards in 2010 and 2011

The Australian office of UK record label Cooperative Music released a collection of Jinja Safari's first and second EPs entitled Locked By Land, as the label's first local release. New single "Sunken House" was added to playlist rotation on Triple J less than a month before the band sold out their largest show to-date, the 1200 capacity Metro Theatre in Sydney.

Jinja Safari were invited to perform their UK debut at Europe's leading festival for new music, The Great Escape Festival in May 2012. BBC Radio 1 DJ and label head of Sunday Best Records Rob Da Bank named the band's sound as a "cosmic pop safari", playing the band's song "Mermaids" on his BBC Radio 1 program and inviting the band to play at Bestival 2012.

== Name ==
Jinja Safari is named after the East African town of Jinja, in Uganda:

I grew up in Tasmania and my grandmother lives in Uganda, in the town of Jinja - so for some reason I always felt the connection to the music of Africa, and how, despite the oppressions of countless dictatorships, genocide and apartheid, the people of Africa always found a way to smash a drum, yelling with a giant smile, dancing barefoot in the dirt. - Marcus Azon (Jinja Safari)

== Discography ==
=== Albums ===
List of albums, with selected details
Title	Details
Locked By Land	Released: October 2011; Format: CD; Label: Cooperative Music (JS001)
Jinja Safari	Released: May 2013; Format: CD; Label: Island
Crescent Sun	Released: August 2016; Format: CD; Label: Jinja Safari
Crescent Moon	Released: August 2016; Format: CD; Label: Jinja Safari

=== EPs ===
List of EPs, with Australian chart positions
Title	EP details	Peak chart positions
Title	EP details	AUS Physical
Jinja Safari	Released: August 2010; Format: CD, Digital; Label: Other Tongues (YMR0001)	4
