= Leader Cheetah =

Australian indie rock band

- Origin: Adelaide, South Australia, Australia
- Genres: Alternative country; indie rock
- Years active: 2007–2016
- Label: Spunk
- Past members: Daniel Crannitch; Joel Crannitch; Mark Harding; Dan Pash; Tom Spall

Leader Cheetah were an Australian indie rock band from Adelaide, South Australia, formed in 2007 by members of defunct Adelaide bands Pharaohs and Bad Girls of the Bible. The band toured nationally and appeared at festivals such as Splendour in the Grass, Big Day Out, St Jerome's Laneway Festival and Come Together. The group released its debut studio album, The Sunspot Letters, in 2009, followed by their second album, Lotus Skies, in 2011. The group have also toured alongside such high-profile international acts as Interpol, Dinosaur Jr. and Dan Auerbach, Blitzen Trapper and Elbow. They disbanded in January 2016.

== History ==
Leader Cheetah were formed in Adelaide in 2007 by Daniel Crannitch on lead vocals and guitar, his brother, Joel Crannitch, on drums, Mark Harding on bass guitar and Dan Pash on lead guitar and harmonies. The Crannitch brothers were members of the Pharaohs, a dance-rock band; while Pash was a member of Bad Girls of the Bible.

Pash later recalled "We knew each other from playing around in bands, but I think we started really bonding over drunken musical chats and just discovered we had a shared love of all this classic '70s stuff. Classic songwriting and everything from Link Wray to Lee Hazlewood and all that '70s west-coast stuff. And of course the big one was Neil Young and Crazy Horse."

In March 2009 the group independently released their debut album, The Sunspot Letters, which peaked at No. 64 on the ARIA Albums Chart. It was preceded by the single, "Bloodlines". In the wake of the album's release Leader Cheetah embarked on a series of national tours alongside Cloud Control. Also in 2009 front man, Dan Crannitch, was a contestant on SBS music program, RocKwiz, alongside Sarah Blasko.

The group released their second album, Lotus Skies, in July 2011, which debuted at No. 98. One of its tracks, "Our Love", has feature vocals by Holly Throsby.

In September 2011 they described Pash's hearing loss, "[a] combination of hearing damage and a congenital defect has eroded his hearing so badly he must wear earplugs and earmuffs whenever he performs or rehearses to protect what hearing he has left." By December of that year they were performing acoustics sets with Pash replaced by Tom Spall on violin.

They announced their disbandment in January 2016, "[it] feels like a good time to finally take the time and thank those involved with Leader Cheetah during its four and a half-year existence and say farewell. It was a hell of a ride and many amazing experiences were had."

In mid 2016 Joel and Dan Crannitch reunited in Adelaide to form "The San Sebastian". In May 2018 "The San Sebastian" released their first album, Alive on the Black Sea, produced by Phil Ek.

== Members ==
- Daniel Crannitch – vocals, guitar
- Joel Crannitch – drums
- Mark Harding – bass
- Dan Pash – lead guitar, harmonies
- Tom Spall – violin

== Discography ==
=== Studio albums ===
Title	Details	Peak chart positions
Title	Details	AUS
The Sunspot Letter	Released: March 2009; Label: Spunk (URA278); Format: CD, digital download, LP	64
Lotus Skies	Released: July 2011; Label: Spunk (URA353); Format: CD, digital download	98

== Awards ==
=== Fowler's Live Music Awards ===
The Fowler's Live Music Awards took place from 2012 to 2014 to "recognise success and achievement over the past 12 months [and] celebrate the great diversity of original live music" in South Australia. Since 2015 they're known as the South Australian Music Awards.

Year	Nominee / work	Award	Result (wins only)
2012	Leader Cheetah	Best Pop Artist	Won
