= Last Dinosaurs =

Australian indie rock band

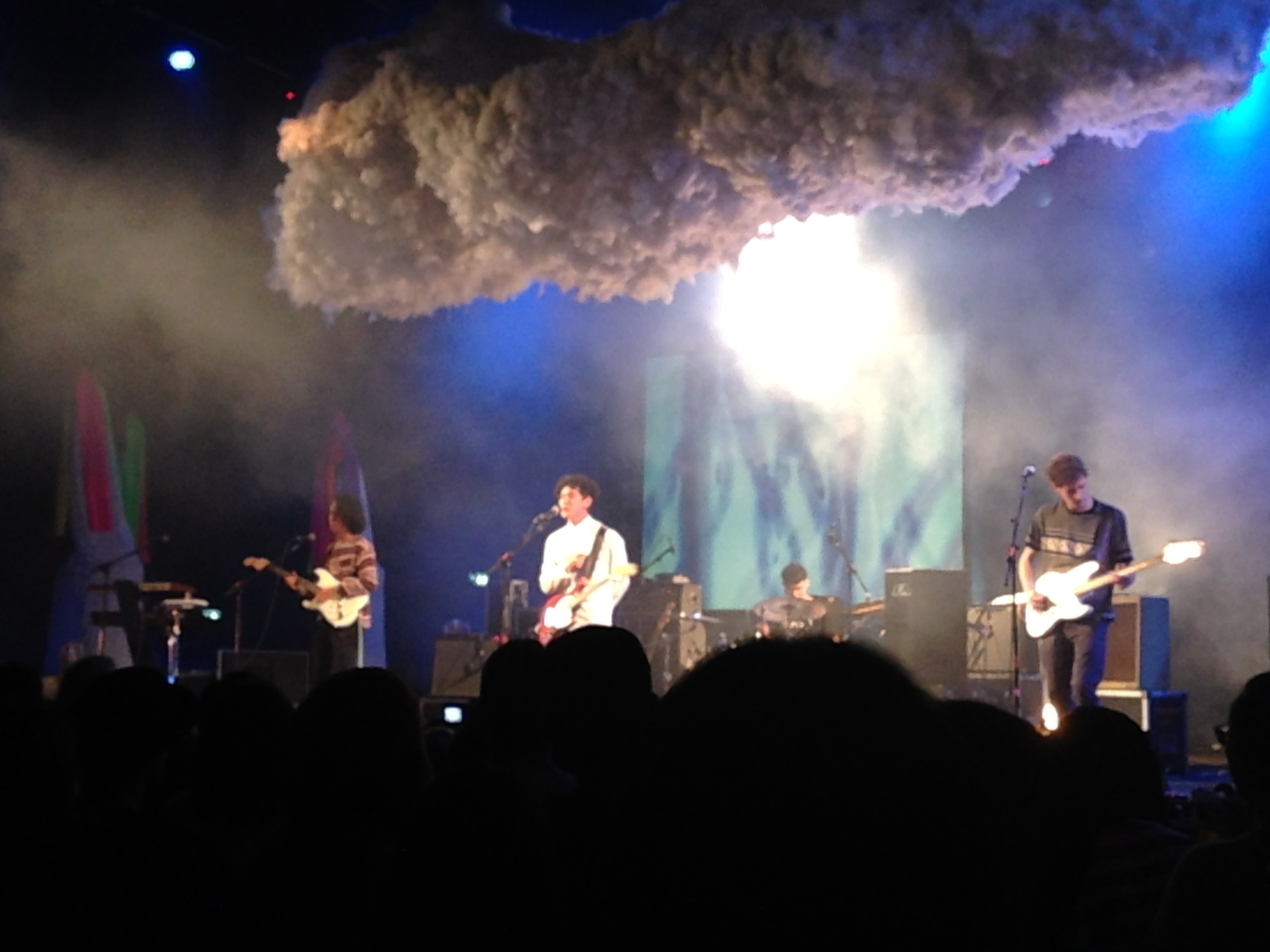
- Last Dinosaurs performing in Bangkok, 2013

Background information
- Origin: Brisbane, Queensland, Australia
- Genres: Indie rock; indie pop; dance-punk; alternative rock; synthpop; shoegaze; city pop; nu-disco
- Years active: 2007—present
- Labels: Dew Process, Universal Music, Fiction
- Members: Sean Caskey; Lachlan Caskey; Michael Sloane
- Past members: Sam Gethin-Jones; Dan Koyama
- Website: lastdinosaurs.com

Last Dinosaurs are an Australian indie rock band from Brisbane, Queensland, formed in 2007. The band consists of Sean Caskey and Lachlan Caskey, both of whom are lead vocalists and guitarists, and bassist Michael Sloane. The Caskey brothers are of Japanese descent.

The band's debut 2010 EP, Back from the Dead and subsequent 2012 debut studio album, In A Million Years, received critical praise from Australian media critics, including Triple J. The band is currently signed to independent label Dew Process in Australia and Fiction Records in the United Kingdom. Internationally, Last Dinosaurs distributes through Universal Music Group.

On 28 August 2015, Last Dinosaurs released their second album, Wellness. On 5 October 2018, the band released their third album, Yumeno Garden. On 4 November 2022, they released their fourth album, From Mexico with Love. On 21 May 2024, they released their fifth album, KYORYU. On 13 February 2026, they released their sixth album, Wellnxss, a remake of Wellness, featuring 5 new songs.

== History ==
=== 2007–2010: Formation and Back from the Dead ===
In 2007, Sean Caskey and former drummer Dan Koyama met during high school, starting a band called "The Cairos" that would later become Last Dinosaurs. Soon afterwards, Sean's younger brother, Lachlan Caskey, joined the band as lead guitarist. Sam Gethin-Jones also joined as their bassist.

The band is named after the song "Last Dinosaur" by the Japanese rock band, The Pillows.

After launching their debut extended play in 2010, the band found success after posting their demo to the Triple J Unearthed project. Not long after, they were interviewed by radio DJ Zan Rowe. The hit track "Honolulu" from Back from the Dead was placed on high rotation on national broadcaster Triple J, giving the band significant traction. They were invited to play at music festivals including Splendour in the Grass, the Laneway Festival, the Falls Festival and Southbound, and supported bands such as Foals, Matt & Kim, Lost Valentinos and Foster the People.

=== 2011–2012: In a Million Years ===
In early 2011, the band announced that they planned to record their debut album after their "Back from the Dead" tour in mid-2010. In June 2011, the band started a Tumblr blog narrating their recording process for the album with producer Jean-Paul Fung at BJB Studios in Sydney, Australia. The album In A Million Years was released on 2 March 2012. The album made an Australian Top 10 Debut, ranking eighth on the Australian Albums Chart and number 2 on the digital album charts. The band completed a sold-out national tour in Australia, going on to tour in the UK and Europe. They later released the album in the UK in September 2012.

=== 2013–2015: Wellness ===
On 23 July 2013, Sam Gethin-Jones announced that he was leaving the band in order to pursue a different musical sound and personal pathway. Beginning with their South African tour in September 2013, Michael Sloane toured with Last Dinosaurs, substituting as bass player and providing backing vocals. Sloane had previously worked with the band as a bassist and music video director for "Zoom," "Time and Place," and "Andy." On 28 January 2014, Last Dinosaurs officially announced that Michael had returned as a full-time bassist.

On 1 May 2015, Last Dinosaurs released "Evie", the first single from their upcoming second album Wellness. "Evie" was premiered by Linda Marigliano on Triple J's "Good Nights" program on 30 April 2015. The second single, "Apollo," was also premiered by Marigliano on Triple J's Good Nights program on 15 July 2015, along with the announcement of Last Dinosaurs' second album, Wellness. Recording occurred at The Grove Studios near Gosford, New South Wales.

Wellness was released internationally on 26 August 2015. The album featured all new songs except "Zero" and "Stream," which the band debuted live while touring in 2013. Wellness debuted at number 18 in the Australian ARIA Charts.

The Wellness tour was completed from 15 September 2015 to 18 October 2015. In 2016, they completed the "Miracle Methods" tour, which was exclusive to Australia.

=== 2018–2021: Yumeno Garden and singles ===
On 20 February 2018, Last Dinosaurs released the single, "Dominos", and two corresponding music videos. "Eleven," the second single, was released on 4 July 2018. Soon after, a music video for "Eleven" was uploaded on 30 July 2018. On 5 October 2018, the band's self-produced third album, Yumeno Garden, was released. During an interview that took place after the album's release, it was clarified that Dan Koyama was no longer a part of the band.

On 24 April 2019, Last Dinosaurs announced a European tour, playing them in late November. Shortly after completing their first US tour in the spring, they announced they would return to more US cities in October/November 2019.

On 30 September 2019, Last Dinosaurs released a new single titled "FMU" before beginning their US/EU tour, premiering it on Triple J's "Good Nights" show with Ebony Boadu. Sean stated in an interview that the song's lyrics related to the tense relationship between Hong Kong and China.

On 17 April 2020, the band released another single titled "Flying," which was initially a demo from Lachlan's SoundCloud. The song is a departure from their usual indie rock sound, gearing more towards French house music and 90's inspired nu-disco.

=== 2022: From Mexico with Love ===
On 11 February 2022, the band released their first single for the LP, "Collect Call." They proceeded to release, in the succeeding months, five more singles including "Look Back" on 25 March, "CDMX" on 5 May, "The Hating" on 23 June, "Auto-Sabotage" on 4 August, and "Put Up With The Weather!" on 15 September. From Mexico With Love released in full on 4 November 2022.

The album was written by Lachlan Caskey in Mexico where he was quarantined during COVID-19. He cited the country as being a site of inspiration. The band and James Agnus co-produced the LP once Lachlan returned to Australia, where he was recorded as the album's lead vocalist.

=== 2023–2024: KYORYU ===
On 10 November 2023, they released the EP RYU, containing the singles "Afterlife," and "Walking on Ice" (released 6 October 2023). On 11 January 2024, "N.P.D" and its music video was released as the first single for the companion EP, Kyo. The second single and music video, "Keys to Your Civic," was released on 23 February 2024. KYO released on 5 April 2024, and the complete LP project of KYORYU was released 21 May 2024. There were published companion manga releases for each half of the album.

Kyoryu has been characterized by both Caskeys as being a concept album focused in a dystopian future with AI satellites and outer space exploration. The EP titles, RYU and KYO, are shortened versions of their Japanese middle names: "Ryusuke" for Sean, and "Kyohei" for Lachlan. When their names are placed together, KYORYU translates to dinosaur in Japanese, which Lachlan stated in an interview was just only coincidental.

== Members ==
Current members

- Sean Caskey – vocals, guitar (2007–present)
- Lachlan Caskey – vocals, guitar (2007–present)
- Michael Sloane – bass, backing vocals (2007, 2013–present)

Current touring musicians

- Jasper Gundersen – drums (2023–present)

Former members

- Sam Gethin-Jones – bass (2007–2013)
- Dan Koyama – drums (2007–2018)

Former touring musicians

- Alistar Richardson – drums (2019)
- Finn Polbodetto – drums (2022–2023)

== Discography ==
=== Studio albums ===
Title	Album details	Peak chart positions
Title	Album details	AUS
In a Million Years	Release date: 2 March 2012; Format: CD, LP, digital download; Label: Dew Process/Universal Music Australia	8
Wellness	Release date: 28 August 2015; Format: CD, LP, digital download; Label: Dew Process/Universal Music Australia	18
Yumeno Garden	Release date: 5 October 2018; Format: CD, LP, digital download, streaming; Label: Dew Process/Universal Music Australia	26
From Mexico with Love	Release date: 4 November 2022; Format: LP, digital download, streaming; Label: Nettwerk	—
KYORYU	Release date: 21 May 2024; Format: LP, digital download, streaming; Label: Nettwerk	—

=== Re-issued albums ===
Title	Album details	Peak chart positions
Title	Album details	AUS
Wellnxss	Release date: 13 February 2026; Format: LP, digital download, streaming; Label: Nettwerk	53

=== Extended plays ===
Title	EP details
Back From The Dead	Release date: March 2010; Format: CD, LP, digital download, streaming; Label: Dew Process/Universal Music Australia
Last Dinosaurs on Audiotree Live	Release date: December 2019; Format: digital download, streaming; Label: Audiotree Live
RYU	Release date: 10 November 2023; Format: digital download, streaming; Label: Nettwerk
KYO	Release date: 5 April 2024; Format: digital download, streaming; Label: Nettwerk

=== Singles ===
Year	Single	Album
2009	"As Far as You're Concerned"	Back from the Dead
2010	"Honolulu"	Back from the Dead
2011	"Thousands of Years"	Time & Place
2011	"Time & Place"	In a Million Years
2011	"Zoom"	In a Million Years
2015	"Evie"	Wellness
2015	"Apollo"	Wellness
2018	"Dominos"	Yumeno Garden
2018	"Eleven"	Yumeno Garden
2019	"FMU"	Non-album singles
2020	"Flying"	Non-album singles
2022	"Collect Call"	From Mexico with Love
2022	"Look Back"	From Mexico with Love
2022	"CDMX"	From Mexico with Love
2022	"The Hating"	From Mexico with Love
2022	"Auto-Sabotage"	From Mexico with Love
2022	"Put Up with the Weather!"	From Mexico with Love
2023	"Afterlife"	RYU
2023	"Walking on Ice"	RYU
2024	"N.P.D."	KYO
2024	"Keys to Your Civic"	KYO

== Awards and nominations ==
=== APRA Awards ===
The APRA Awards are presented annually from 1982 by the Australasian Performing Right Association (APRA), "honoring composers and songwriters."

Year	Nominee / work	Award	Result	Ref.
2012	"Zoom" (Sean Caskey / Lachlan Caskey / Samuel Gethin-Jones / Dan Koyama)	Song of the Year	Shortlisted	
