= Lapsley =

Lapsley is a surname, originating in Scotland. Notable people with the surname include:

- Angus Lapsley, British civil servant and diplomat
- David Lapsley (1924–2001), Scottish football player (St. Mirren)
- Hilary Lapsley (born 1949), New Zealand author and psychologist
- John Lapsley KBE, CB, DFC, AFC, RAF (1916–1995), World War II fighter pilot; later a senior Royal Air Force commander
- John Lapsley (footballer) (born 1951), Scottish football player (Airdrieonians)
- Låpsley (born 1996), British singer-songwriter and electronic music artist
- Michael Lapsley SSM (born 1949), South African Anglican priest and social activist
- Phil Lapsley (born 1965), American electrical engineer, hacker, and entrepreneur
- Samuel Norvell Lapsley (1866–1892), American Presbyterian missionary partner of William Henry Sheppard in the Congo

== See also ==
- Joseph Lapsley Wilson (1844-1928), American military officer, railroad executive, and horticulturist
- Lapsley W. Hamblen Jr. (1926–2012), judge of the United States Tax Court

Media related to Lapsley at Wikimedia Commons
