= James Lapslie =

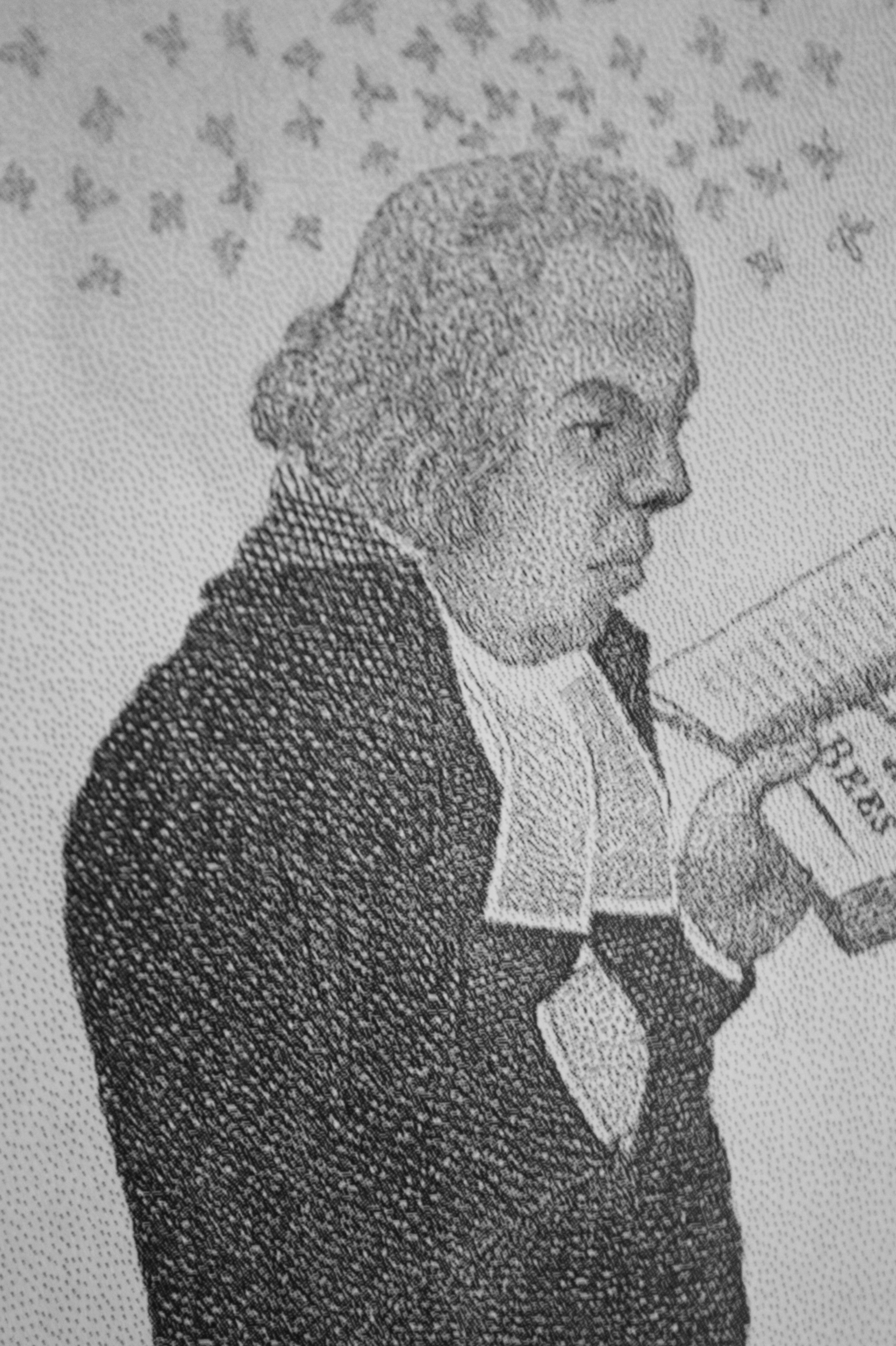
Rev James Lapslie by John Kay 1793 (detail)

James Lapslie (1750–1824) was a Scottish minister and local historian serving Campsie. He played a role in the trial of Thomas Muir of Huntershill in 1793. Kay drew him and dubbed him the "Pension Hunter" at the trial.

== Life ==
He was born on 12 June 1750, the son of John Lapslie, a tacksman and tenant of Bencloich Mill, and his wife, Margaret Lockhart (1730–1754) who died when James was four. His father remarried and thereafter he seemed distant from both father and step-mother. His father did however encourage his interest in the ministry and supported his study of Divinity at Glasgow University.

He undertook a Grand Tour of Europe with Sir James Suttie, who afterwards afforded him many good social connections.

He became minister of Campsie on 27 November 1783, taking over from Rev William Bell. He held his post for 41 years.

His first appearance in British history is in 1785 at the descent of the first hot-air balloon in Campsie, where Lapslie met the famous Vincent Lunardi upon his arrival.

In November 1792, in the wake of the French Revolution, a number of Friends of the People organisations were set up in Scotland (also known as Reform Societies). The local calico printing industry proved a centre for these groups in Kirkintilloch and Milton of Campsie. At the infamous trial of Thomas Muir, Lapslie appeared as an uncalled witness to speak against Muir, despite being a friend of the Muir family and established a firmly anti-democratic stance, stressing the dangers of democracy. In this he stood in opposition to Rev. William Dunn who took the pro-democratic stance. Lapslie appears to have been able to cross-examine Muir at some point, fooling the presiding Lord Armadale into believing that he had some legitimate presence. Muir strongly objected to Lapslie's appearance, and the court upheld this objection and continued without Lapslie's evidence.

This action led to Lapslie's actions being put to verse:

My name is James Lapslie, I preach and I pray

And as an Informer, I expect good pay

In 1797 he also engaged himself in debate upon the Militia Act of that year. He also famously and strangely spoke out against the use of Sunday schools, as he also saw these as a means of spreading the concept of democracy.

In 1816 Lapslie appears as a "fine orator" at the General Assembly of the Church of Scotland in Edinburgh, speaking in defence of a fellow minister accused of indiscretions with his housekeeper.

He died suddenly on 11 December 1824 at the Star Inn on Ingram Street in Glasgow (home of the Glasgow Society of Friends). His ministry was continued by Norman MacLeod. His funeral at Clachan of Campsie was interrupted by his debtors, who insisted on payment before the service completed. These were paid by John Stirling.

== Family ==
Lapslie married Elizabeth Ann Stirling (daughter of John Stirling) (1753–1825) on 10 September 1792. They had four sons: John Stirling Lapslie (1793–1813), James Lapslie (1799–1819), Alexander Hume Lapslie and Andrew Lapslie; and two daughters, Margaret Lockhart (b.1796) and Gloriana Folsome (b.1797). Two further sons, Samuel and Alexander (primus) died in infancy. All four surviving sons attended Glasgow University. James and Alexander both followed in their father's footsteps and trained as ministers. Andrew studied medicine.

James Stirling Lapslie went to the West Indies and died in Tobago. John went to the East Indies and died in Old Batavia.

== Publications ==
- Essay on the Management of Bees (c.1790)
- A Statistical Account of Campsie (1793)
