= Splendour in the Grass =

Annual Australian music festival

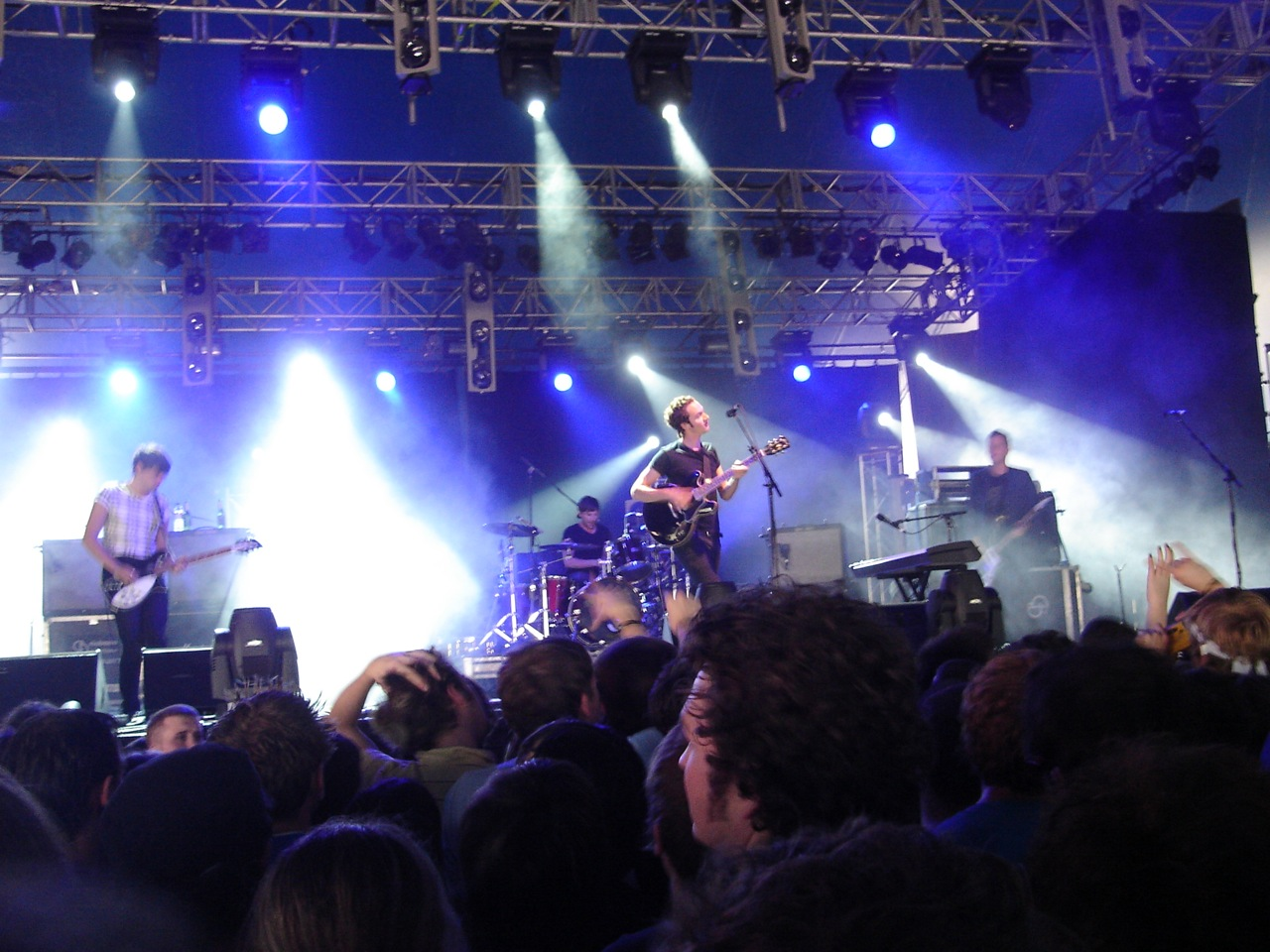
- Editors performing at Splendour in the Grass in 2007
- Genre: Indie rock, hip hop, electronic, alternative
- Dates: Late July–Early August
- Locations: Australia: Byron Bay, NSW (2001–2009, 2012), Woodford, QLD (2010–2011), Yelgun, NSW (2013–2023)
- Years active: 2001–2023
- Founders: Jessica Ducrou and Paul Piticco
- Website: Official Website

Splendour in the Grass, commonly referred to as Splendour, is an Australian music festival first held in 2001. Its most recent edition took place in 2023 at North Byron Parklands in Yelgun, New South Wales. Earlier editions were held near Byron Bay and at Woodford, Queensland. The planned 2024 edition was cancelled, and organisers announced that the festival would not return in 2025.

== History ==
Splendour in the Grass was launched in 2001 by co-founders Jessica Ducrou and Paul Piticco through Village Sounds Agency and Secret Service. It began as a one-day winter music event.

A 1804 poem, "Ode: Intimations of Immortality", by English poet William Wordsworth, was the inspiration for the events naming. The festival extended to two days in 2002 and three days in 2009. Splendour relocated from Byron Bay in New South Wales, to Woodford in Queensland, for its 2010 and 2011 editions while approval for the proposed North Byron Parklands venue remained unresolved. It returned to Belongil Fields in Byron Bay in 2012. The 2013 edition was the first held at North Byron Parklands. In March 2019, North Byron Parklands received permanent approval as the home of Splendour in the Grass and Falls Festival.

The festival featured established and emerging artists. The music festival has attracted notable artists such as Coldplay, Powderfinger, Arctic Monkeys, Kanye West, Tame Impala and Lorde.

Australian artist Flume first performed at Splendour in an early-afternoon Mix Up Tent slot in 2012, closed the same stage in 2013 and headlined the main stage in 2016. He then returned as a headliner in 2023. Performance slots at the festival were also awarded through triple j Unearthed competitions, with winners including Tones and I in 2019 and DICE and GIMMY in 2023.

The 2020 edition was postponed until 2021 because of the COVID-19 pandemic. In March 2021, the festival was rescheduled from July to November, before being moved again to July 2022 in August 2021. In its place, Splendour held the virtual festival Splendour XR on 24 and 25 July 2021. The event received A$1.5 million through the federal government’s RISE program and was hosted on Sansar. Performances included Khalid, The Killers, Charli XCX, CHVRCHES, Denzel Curry, Vance Joy, Tash Sultana and Masked Wolf.

The festival returned in July 2022. All main-stage performances on the first day, including Gorillaz’s scheduled headline set, were cancelled because of severe weather and flooding. The Strokes and Tyler, the Creator headlined the following two nights.

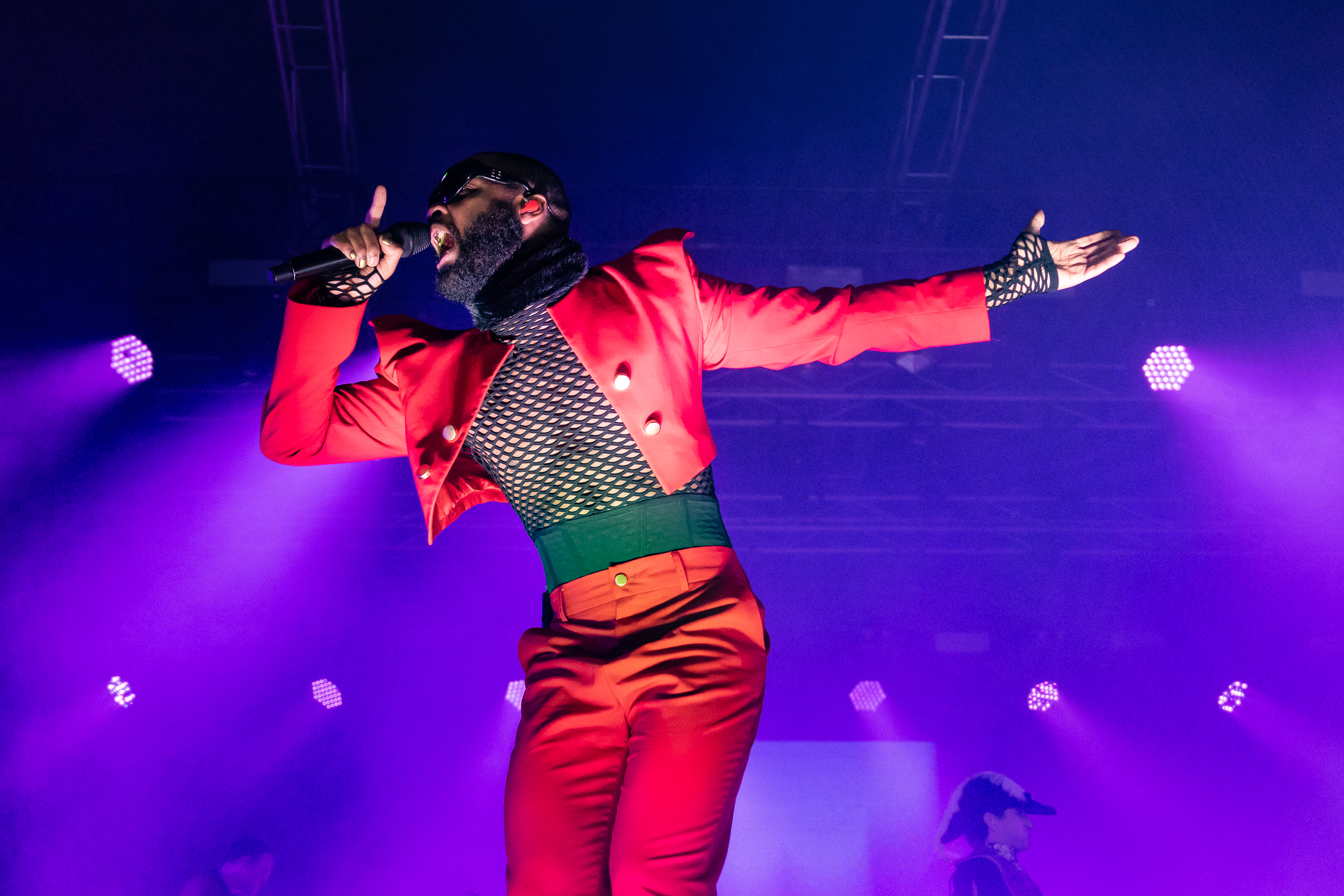
Genesis Owusu performing at the festival in 2022.

The 2023 edition was also held in July, featuring Lizzo, Flume, and Mumford & Sons.

The 2024 edition was scheduled to run from 19 to 21 July, with Kylie Minogue, Future and Arcade Fire headlining the festival. The festival was cancelled on 27 March 2024, with organisers citing “unexpected events”. Following the cancellation, Australian Festival Association managing director Mitch Wilson told triple j’s Hack program that ticket sales had been insufficient to cover rising festival costs, which he said had increased by 30 to 40 percent.

In January 2025, organisers announced that Splendour in the Grass would not return in 2025, saying the festival needed more time before returning in the future.

== Ownership ==
According to company records reviewed by The Guardian, Secret Sounds Group owns or has interests in Splendour in the Grass Pty Ltd. In 2016, Live Nation Entertainment acquired a 51 per cent controlling stake in Secret Sounds Group. Live Nation increased its stake in Secret Sounds in July 2023 after exercising an option to acquire additional shares from the company’s other shareholders.

== Awards and nominations ==
=== National Live Music Awards ===
The National Live Music Awards (NLMAs) are a broad recognition of Australia's diverse live industry, celebrating the success of the Australian live scene. The awards commenced in 2016.

Year	Nominee / work	Award	Result
National Live Music Awards of 2016	Splendour in the Grass	Best Live Music Festival or Event	Nominated
National Live Music Awards of 2017	Splendour in the Grass	Best Live Music Festival or Event	Nominated
National Live Music Awards of 2018	Splendour in the Grass	NSW Live Event of the Year	Won

== Festival summary by year ==
Edition	Year	Dates	Headliner/s
1st	2001	21 July	Powderfinger
2nd	2002	20–21 July	Gomez (UK); Supergrass (UK)
3rd	2003	19–20 July	Powderfinger; Coldplay (UK)
4th	2004	24–25 July	PJ Harvey (UK); Jurassic 5 (USA)
5th	2005	23–24 July	Queens of the Stone Age (USA); Moby (USA)
6th	2006	22–23 July	Sonic Youth (USA); Brian Wilson (USA)
7th	2007	4–5 August	Powderfinger; Arctic Monkeys (UK)
8th	2008	2–3 August	Devo (USA); Wolfmother
9th	2009	25–26 July	Bloc Party (UK); Flaming Lips (USA)
10th	2010	30 July–August 1	The Strokes (USA); Pixies (USA); Ben Harper & Relentless7 (USA)
11th	2011	29–31 July	Coldplay (UK); Kanye West (USA); Jane's Addiction (USA)
12th	2012	27–29 July	Jack White (USA); Bloc Party (UK); The Smashing Pumpkins (USA)
13th	2013	26–28 July	Mumford & Sons (UK); The National (USA); ~~Frank Ocean (USA)~~; Lorde (NZ)
14th	2014	25–27 July	Outkast (USA); ~~Two Door Cinema Club (UK)~~; Foals (UK); Lily Allen (UK)
15th	2015	24–26 July	Blur (UK); Florence and the Machine (UK); Mark Ronson (UK)
16th	2016	22–24 July	The Strokes (USA); The Cure (UK); Flume
17th	2017	21–23 July	The xx (UK); Queens of the Stone Age (USA); LCD Soundsystem (USA)
18th	2018	20–22 July	Kendrick Lamar (USA); Lorde (NZ); Vampire Weekend (USA)
19th	2019	19–21 July	Tame Impala; Childish Gambino (USA); ~~Chance the Rapper (USA)~~; Hilltop Hoods
20th	~~2020~~	Originally scheduled for 24–26 July, later rescheduled to 23–25 October, later postponed to 2021 due to the COVID-19 pandemic	Booked for 2020: Flume; The Strokes (USA); Tyler, the Creator (USA)
20th	~~2021~~	Originally scheduled for 23–25 July, later rescheduled to 19–21 November, later postponed to 2022 due to ongoing restrictions related to the COVID-19 pandemic	Booked for 2021: Gorillaz (UK); The Strokes (USA); Tyler, the Creator (USA)
20th	2022	22–24 July	~~Gorillaz~~ (UK); The Strokes (USA); Tyler, the Creator (USA)
21st	2023	21–23 July	Lizzo (USA); Flume; Mumford & Sons (UK)
22nd	2024	Originally scheduled for 19–21 July, later cancelled due to 'unexpected events'.	Kylie Minogue; Future (USA); Arcade Fire (CAN)

== Controversies ==
=== Ticketing Issues ===
Tickets for the 2005 festival were sold out within 11 hours and, soon after, festival tickets that initially cost A$125 were offered on eBay at inflated prices of up to A$3000. The festival organisers responded by sending "cease and desist" letters to eBay, as well as around 150 ticket resellers, citing a breach of the conditions of sale. However, eBay refused to block the ticket auctions, claiming it was the seller's responsibility to ensure that they have the ability and right to sell products. The Triple J radio station encouraged its listeners to sabotage the bidding process and fake bids of up to A$10,000 were consequently listed on eBay by protesters opposed to ticket scalping. Following media coverage, the NSW Department of Fair Trading became involved and met with eBay representatives. The then-Fair Trading Minister John Hatzistergos instructed the Office of Fair Trading to investigate the reselling of tickets and determine whether resellers were in breach of the Fair Trading Act. Festival promoters hoped that the investigation would eventually lead to the introduction of anti-ticket scalping legislation.

To combat ticket scalping, organisers introduced a new ticketing system for the 2006 festival. Purchasers were required to provide the name and date of birth of each ticket holder, which were printed on the ticket, and attendees had to present photo identification at the gate. Purchases were limited to ten tickets per customer.

Festival organisers encountered difficulties with the ticketing system provided by the Qjump company in 2008, as consumers were unable to purchase tickets following lengthy delays. Qjump later issued an apology on the festival's Internet forum.

In July 2022, hours before performers were set to go on stage and while artists were conducting soundchecks, festival organisers controversially made the decision to cancel all performances scheduled for the first day on the main stage due to poor weather and flooding. Ticketholders took to social media angry after the festival organisers had stated that the "show will go on rain, hail or shine" earlier in the day, prior to the cancellation.

=== Venue issues ===
For a once-only trial, the organisers obtained permission to stage the 2009 Splendour in the Grass at a site in Yelgun. However, the consent provided to the organisers was the subject of a challenge by a group of residents, environmentalists and the Environmental Defenders Office of NSW, who presented their case in the Land and Environment Court of New South Wales. The Chief Judge of the Land and Environment Court, Justice Brian Preston, ruled that Byron Shire Council had exceeded its powers by granting the development consent where the land included parts zoned for conservation purposes. The development consent was ruled invalid, prohibiting the festival from being held at the Yelgun site. As a consequence of the decision, the festival remained at the Belongil site in 2009, before returning one more time in 2012.

In 2016 attendees made accusations they were forced to walk from the venue or sleep in the mud due to a lack of transport.

== See also ==
- List of Splendour in the Grass line-ups
- Splendour in the Grass 2019
