= Flume discography =

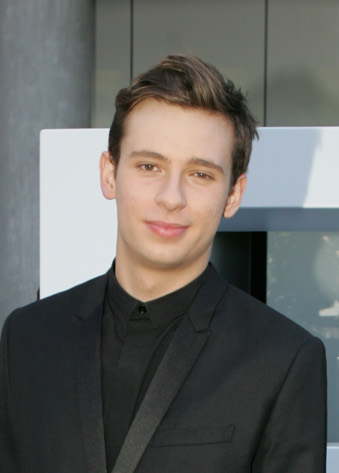
- Flume at the 2013 ARIA Music Awards
- Studio albums: 4
- EPs: 5
- Singles: 25
- Music videos: 12

Australian DJ and musician Flume has released four studio albums, three mixtape albums, five extended plays, twenty-five singles (including two as a featured artist).

== Albums ==
=== Studio albums ===
Title	Details	Peak chart positions							Certifications
Title	Details	AUS	BEL (FL)	BEL (WA)	NLD	NZ	UK	US	Certifications
Flume	Released: 9 November 2012; Label: Future Classic; Format: CD, LP, digital download	1	139	180	67	12	—	—	ARIA: 2× Platinum; RMNZ: Gold
Skin	Released: 27 May 2016; Label: Future Classic; Format: CD, LP, digital download	1	3	13	17	1	25	8	ARIA: Platinum; RIAA: Gold
Palaces	Released: 20 May 2022; Label: Future Classic; Format: CD, LP, cassette, digital download	3	60	139	—	18	—	162	
Dumb (with Emma Louise)	Released: 22 August 2025; Label: Self-released; Format: Digital download, streaming	— (Note: Dumb did not enter the ARIA top 100, but peaked at number 11 on the Australian Artist Albums.)	—	—	—	—	—	—	
"—" denotes an extended play that did not chart or was not released.

=== Remix albums ===
Title	Details
Skin: The Remixes	Released: 7 April 2017; Label: Future Classic; Format: Digital download

=== Mixtapes ===
Title	Details	Peak chart positions					
Title	Details	AUS	BEL (FL)	BEL (WA)	NLD	NZ	US
Hi This Is Flume	Released: 20 March 2019; Label: Future Classic; Format: Digital download, LP	11	27	139	87	11	185
Things Don't Always Go the Way You Plan	Released: 8 February 2023; Label: Future Classic; Format: Digital download, streaming	94	193	—	—	—	—
Arrived Anxious, Left Bored	Released: 3 May 2023; Label: Future Classic; Format: Digital download, streaming	—	—	—	—	—	—
"—" denotes an extended play that did not chart or was not released.

== Extended plays ==
Title	Details	Peak chart positions	Certifications
Title	Details	AUS	Certifications
Lockjaw (with Chet Faker)	Released: 22 November 2013; Label: Future Classic; Format: CD, 12", digital download	—	ARIA: 2× Platinum
Skin Companion EP 1	Released: 25 November 2016; Label: Future Classic; Format: 12", digital download	29	
Skin Companion EP 2	Released: 17 February 2017; Label: Future Classic; Format: 12", digital download	67	
Quits (with Reo Cragun)	Released: 2 August 2019; Label: Future Classic; Format: Digital download, streaming	—	ARIA: Gold
We Live in a Society (with JPEGMafia)	Released: 2 May 2025; Label: Future Classic; Format: Digital download, streaming	—	
"—" denotes an extended play that did not chart or was not released.

== Singles ==
=== As lead artist ===
List of singles, with year released, selected chart positions, certifications, and album name shown
Title	Year	Peak chart positions										Certifications	Album
Title	Year	AUS	AUS Indie	BEL (FL)	FRA	ITA	NZ	UK	UK Dance	US	US Dance	Certifications	Album
"Sleepless" (featuring Anthony for Cleopatra)	2011	—	—	—	—	—	—	—	—	—	—		Non-album single
"On Top" (featuring T.Shirt)	2012	57	3	—	—	—	—	—	—	—	—	ARIA: Gold; RMNZ: Platinum	Flume
"Sleepless" (featuring Jezzabell Doran)	2012	53	5	—	—	—	31	—	—	—	—	ARIA: Gold; RMNZ: Platinum	Flume
"Holdin On"	2012	17	1	— (Note: "Holdin On" did not enter the Ultratop 50, but peaked at number six on the Flemish Ultratip chart.)	—	—	22	—	—	—	—	ARIA: 2× Platinum; RMNZ: 3× Platinum	Flume
"Drop the Game" (with Chet Faker)	2013	18	1	—	125	—	—	—	—	—	—	ARIA: Platinum; BPI: Silver; RMNZ: 2× Platinum	Lockjaw
"Some Minds" (featuring Andrew Wyatt)	2015	27	2	—	—	—	—	—	—	—	19	ARIA: Gold; RMNZ: Gold	Non-album single
"Never Be like You" (featuring Kai)	2016	1	1	10	27	81	2	95	22	20	3	ARIA: 7× Platinum; BEA: Platinum; BPI: Platinum; MC: 2× Platinum; RIAA: 2× Platinum; RMNZ: 8× Platinum; SNEP: Platinum	Skin
"Smoke & Retribution" (featuring Vince Staples and Kučka)	2016	23	3	—	—	—	— (Note: "Smoke & Retribution" did not enter the NZ Top 40 Singles Chart, but peaked at number six on the Heatseekers chart.)	—	—	—	18	ARIA: Gold; RMNZ: Gold	Skin
"Say It" (featuring Tove Lo)	2016	5	1	36	154	—	4	69	26	60	—	ARIA: 4× Platinum; BPI: Gold; MC: Gold; RIAA: Gold; RMNZ: 4× Platinum	Skin
"Hyperreal" (featuring Kučka)	2017	60	2	—	—	—	— (Note: "Hyperreal" did not enter the NZ Top 40 Singles Chart, but peaked at number six on the Heatseekers chart.)	—	—	—	36	RMNZ: Gold	Skin Companion EP 2
"Friends" (featuring Reo Cragun)	2019	72	6	—	—	—	— (Note: "Friends" did not enter the NZ Top 40 Singles Chart, but peaked at number eight on the NZ Hot Singles Chart.)	—	—	—	18	RMNZ: Gold	Quits
"Let You Know" (featuring London Grammar)	2019	31	4	— (Note: "Let You Know" did not enter the Ultratop 50, but peaked at number nine on the Flemish Ultratip chart.)	—	—	— (Note: "Let You Know" did not enter the NZ Top 40 Singles Chart, but peaked at number nine on the NZ Hot Singles Chart.)	—	—	—	20	ARIA: Gold; RMNZ: Gold	Non-album singles
"Rushing Back" (featuring Vera Blue)	2019	8	2	— (Note: "Rushing Back" did not enter the Ultratop 50, but peaked at number 24 on the Flemish Ultratip chart.)	—	—	— (Note: "Rushing Back" did not enter the NZ Top 40 Singles Chart, but peaked at number two on the NZ Hot Singles Chart.)	—	—	—	12	ARIA: 6× Platinum; RMNZ: 2× Platinum	Non-album singles
"The Difference" (with Toro y Moi)	2020	23	4	— (Note: "The Difference" did not enter the Ultratop 50, but peaked at number 26 on the Flemish Ultratip chart.)	—	—	— (Note: "The Difference" did not enter the NZ Top 40 Singles Chart, but peaked at number seven on the NZ Hot Singles Chart.)	—	—	—	10	RMNZ: 2× Platinum	Non-album singles
"Say Nothing" (featuring May-a)	2022	4	1	—	—	—	— (Note: "Say Nothing" did not enter the NZ Top 40 Singles Chart, but peaked at number five on the NZ Hot Singles Chart.)	—	—	—	12	ARIA: 2× Platinum; RMNZ: Gold	Palaces
"Sirens" (featuring Caroline Polachek)	2022	—	—	—	—	—	— (Note: "Sirens" did not enter the NZ Top 40 Singles Chart, but peaked at number 27 on the NZ Hot Singles Chart.)	—	—	—	24		Palaces
"Escape" (with Quiet Bison featuring Kučka)	2022	—	—	—	—	—	— (Note: "Escape" did not enter the NZ Top 40 Singles Chart, but peaked at number 26 on the NZ Hot Singles Chart.)	—	—	—	28		Palaces
"Palaces" (featuring Damon Albarn)	2022	—	—	—	—	—	—	—	—	—	49		Palaces
"Hollow" (featuring Emma Louise)	2022	—	17	—	—	—	— (Note: "Hollow" did not enter the NZ Top 40 Singles Chart, but peaked at number 17 on the NZ Hot Singles Chart.)	—	—	—	22		Palaces
"Slugger 1.4 (2014 Export.WAV)"	2022	—	—	—	—	—	— (Note: "Slugger 1.4" did not enter the NZ Top 40 Singles Chart, but peaked at number 17 on the NZ Hot Singles Chart.)	—	—	—	—		Non-album single
"Shooting Stars (Triple J Like a Version)" (with Toro Y Moi)	2022	—	—	—	—	—	—	—	—	—	—		Non-album single (Note: Later included on the 2025 compilation Triple J's Best Australian Like A Version)
"Silent Assassin" (with Tkay Maidza)	2023	—	—	—	—	—	— (Note: "Silent Assassin" did not enter the NZ Top 40 Singles Chart, but peaked at number 21 on the NZ Hot Singles Chart.)	—	—	—	—		Sweet Justice
"Track 1" (with JPEGMafia)	2025	—	—	—	—	—	— (Note: "Track 1" did not enter the NZ Top 40 Singles Chart, but peaked at number 36 on the NZ Hot Singles Chart.)	—	—	—	—		We Live in a Society
"It It Real?" (with JPEGMafia featuring Ravyn Lenae)	2025	—	—	—	—	—	— (Note: "Is It Real?" did not enter the NZ Top 40 Singles Chart, but peaked at number 10 on the NZ Hot Singles Chart.)	—	—	—	17		We Live in a Society
"Easy Goodbye" (with Emma Louise)	2025	—	—	—	—	—	— (Note: "Easy Goodbye" did not enter the NZ Top 40 Singles Chart, but peaked at number 23 on the NZ Hot Singles Chart.)	—	—	—	—		Dumb
"Shine, Glow, Glisten" (with Emma Louise)	2025	—	—	—	—	—	—	—	—	—	—		Dumb
"Monsoon" (with Emma Louise)	2025	—	—	—	—	—	—	—	—	—	—		Dumb
"—" denotes a recording that did not chart or was not released in that territory.

=== As featured artist ===
List of singles as featured artist, with year released and album name shown
Title	Year	Peak chart positions	Album
Title	Year	NZ Hot	Album
"Ripple" (Sycco featuring Flume and Chrome Sparks)	2022	37	Zorb
"One More Night" (Kučka featuring Flume)	2024	—	Can You Hear Me Dreaming?

== Other charted songs ==
Title	Year	Peak chart positions				Album
Title	Year	AUS	NZ Heat.	NZ Hot	US Dance	Album
"This Song Is Not About a Girl" (with Chet Faker)	2013	52	—	—	—	Lockjaw
"What About Us" (with Chet Faker)	2013	53	—	—	—	Lockjaw
"Helix"	2016	—	—	—	46	Skin
"Lose It" (featuring Vic Mensa)	2016	—	—	—	30	Skin
"Wall Fuck"	2016	—	—	—	29	Skin
"Take a Chance" (featuring Little Dragon)	2016	—	—	—	41	Skin
"Tiny Cities" (featuring Beck)	2016	—	—	—	31	Skin
"Heater"	2016	—	3	—	44	Skin Companion EP 1
"Trust" (featuring Isabella Manfredi)	2016	—	7	—	34	Skin Companion EP 1
"Weekend" (featuring Moses Sumney)	2017	—	7	—	—	Skin Companion EP 2
"Enough" (featuring Pusha T)	2017	—	9	—	—	Skin Companion EP 2
"High Beams" (with HWLS featuring Slowthai)	2019	—	—	7	37	Hi This Is Flume
"Jewel"	2019	—	—	14	35	Hi This Is Flume
"Ecdysis"	2019	—	—	15	43	Hi This Is Flume
"Voices" (featuring Sophie and Kučka)	2019	—	—	27	—	Hi This Is Flume
"Quits" (with Reo Cragun)	2019	—	—	11	30	Quits
"Levitate" (with Reo Cragun)	2019	—	—	39	—	Quits
"Highest Building" (featuring Oklou)	2022	—	—	7	12	Palaces
"DHLC"	2022	—	—	20	31	Palaces
"I Can't Tell" (featuring Laurel)	2022	—	—	16	24	Palaces
"Get U"	2022	—	—	—	40	Palaces
"Jasper's Song"	2022	—	—	—	44	Palaces
"Love Light"	2022	—	—	—	47	Palaces
"Go"	2022	—	—	—	45	Palaces
"Rhinestone 1.7.2 (2018 Export.WAV)" (with Isabella Manfredi)	2023	—	—	24	—	Things Don't Always Go the Way You Plan
"Chalk 1.3.3 (2017 Export.WAV)" (featuring Jim-E Stack)	2023	—	—	33	44	Arrived Anxious, Left Bored
"The Ocean Is Fake" (with JPEGMafia)	2025	—	—	40	—	We Live in a Society
"—" denotes an extended play that did not chart or was not released.

== Remixes ==
Title	Year	Peak chart positions					Artist
Title	Year	AUS	AUS Indie	NZ Hot	UK	UK Dance	Artist
"Back and Forth" (Flume vs. Mr. V)	2010	—	—	—	—	—	Fedde le Grand
"The Anthem"	2011	—	—	—	—	—	Onra
"Zimbabwe"	2011	—	—	—	—	—	New Navy
"Gravel Pit"	2012	—	—	—	—	—	Matt Miller x Kilter
"Higher"	2012	—	—	—	—	—	Ta-ku
"Won't Get Lost"	2012	—	—	—	—	—	The Aston Shuffle
"Every Little Step"	2012	—	—	—	—	—	Junior Boys
"HyperParadise"	2012	38	3	—	—	—	Hermitude
"A Baru in New York" (Flume Soundtrack Version)	2013	—	—	—	—	—	Yolanda Be Cool
"Slasherr" (Flume Edit)	2013	—	—	—	—	—	Rustie
"You & Me"	2013	—	—	—	49	17	Disclosure
"Woman of the Ghetto" (Flume's Jackin House Mix)	2013	—	—	—	—	—	Marlena Shaw
"Tennis Court"	2014	—	—	—	—	—	Lorde
"Gold" (Flume Re-work)	2014	—	—	—	—	—	Chet Faker
"Test & Recognise" (Flume Re-work)	2014	—	—	—	—	—	Seekae
"Afterlife"	2014	—	—	—	—	—	Arcade Fire
"Lay Me Down"	2015	—	—	—	—	—	Sam Smith
"Turning"	2015	—	—	—	—	—	Collarbones
"Blue (Da Ba Dee)"	2020	—	—	11	—	—	Eiffel 65
"On a Mountain"	2021	—	—	—	—	—	Danny L Harle
"Noticed I Cried"	2022	—	—	—	—	—	PinkPantheress
"—" denotes a recording that did not chart or was not released in that territory.

== Songwriting and production credits ==
List of songwriting and production credits, with year released, artist(s), co-writers, co-producers, and reference shown
Title	Year	Artist(s)	Credits	Written with	Produced with	Album	Ref.
"I Met You"	2012	Anna Lunoe	Co-writer; producer	—	—	Real Talk	
"Pizza Guy"	2013	Touch Sensitive	Co-writer; producer	—	—	Non-album single	
"Talk Talk"	2014	George Maple	Co-writer	Jessica Higgs; David James; Alexander Burnett	—	Vacant Space EP	
"Vacant Space"	2014	George Maple	Co-writer	Jessica Higgs; Russ Chrimes	—	Vacant Space EP	
"Talk" (featuring George Maple)	2016	DJ Snake	Co-writer	William Grigachine; Jessica Higgs; David James; Alexander Burnett; Chris Emerson	—	Encore	
"I Remember"	2016	AlunaGeorge	Producer	—	George Reid	I Remember	
"The Louvre"	2017	Lorde	Additional producer	—	Lorde; Jack Antonoff; Malay	Melodrama	
"Yeah Right"	2017	Vince Staples	Co-writer; additional producer	Vince Staples; Sophie Xeon; Kendrick Duckworth; Laura Jane Lowther	Sophie	Big Fish Theory	
"Drowning"	2019	Kučka	Co-producer	—	Laura Jane Lowther	Wrestling	
"Ripple"	2022	Sycco	Co-writer; Co-producer	Sarah Aarons, Jeremy Malvin, Sasha McLeod	Chrome Sparks	Zorb	
"Silent Assassin"	2023	Tkay Maidza	Co-writer; producer	Takudzwa Maidza	—	Sweet Justice	
"New Black History" (featuring Vince Staples)	2024	JPEGMafia	Producer	—	JPEGMafia	I Lay Down My Life for You	
"Cult Status"	2025	JPEGMafia	Producer	—	JPEGMafia	I Lay Down My Life for You (Director's Cut)	
"FYA"	2026	BTS	Co-writer; Co-producer	JPEGMafia; Gregory Aldae Hein; Kurtis Wells; Thomas Wesley Pentz; RM; Jung Kook; Richard Cook Mears IV; Suga	Diplo; Nitti	Arirang	

== Essential Mix ==
Flume appeared on the BBC Radio 1 Essential Mix show on 3 October 2015, about six months before the release of his second studio album, Skin. The mix featured his own music and tracks from electronic artists including Jon Hopkins, Amon Tobin, and Jamie xx, as well as hip hop artists Knxwledge, Vic Mensa, Vince Staples, and Kanye West.

== Music videos ==
Title	Year	Director(s)
"I Met You" (Anna Lunoe and Flume)	2012	Melvin J. Montalban
"Sleepless" (featuring Jezzabell Doran)	2012	Damon Cameron
"Left Alone" (featuring Chet Faker)	2013	Rhett Wade-Ferrell
"Holdin On"	2013	Joe Nappa
"More Than You Thought"	2013	Angus Lee Forbes
"On Top" (featuring T.Shirt)	2013	Angus Lee Forbes
"Insane" (featuring Moon Holiday)	2013	Angus Lee Forbes
"Drop the Game" (Flume and Chet Faker)	2013	Lorin Askill
"Some Minds" (featuring Andrew Wyatt)	2015	Clemens Habicht
"Never Be like You" (featuring Kai)	2016	Clemens Habicht
"Say It" (featuring Tove Lo)	2016	Nez
