= Skin: The Remixes =

Remix album by Flume
- Released: 7 April 2017
- Genre: Electronic; dance; future bass
- Length: 76:01
- Label: Mom + Pop; Future Classic
- Producer: Harley Streten

Flume chronology
Skin Companion EP 2 (2017)	Skin: The Remixes (2017)	Hi This Is Flume (2019)

Skin: The Remixes is the first remix album by Australian electronic musician Flume, released on 7 April 2017, by Future Classic. It contains various remixes and re-recordings of selections from Flume's second studio album Skin (2016).

== Background and release ==
Flume released his second studio album Skin in May 2016. The lead single "Never Be like You" was certified 5× Platinum and was the fourth highest-selling single in Australia and New Zealand in 2016. It was also ranked number one on the Triple J Hottest 100, 2016. The album's third single, "Say It" was certified 3× Platinum and was the twentieth highest-selling single in Australia in 2016. The album won eight ARIA Music Awards at the ARIA Music Awards of 2016, three APRA Awards at the APRA Music Awards of 2017 and one Grammy Award for Best Dance/Electronic Album at the 2017 Grammy Awards.

== Track listing ==
No.	Title	Lyrics	Music	Producer(s)	Length
1.	"Numb & Getting Colder" (Baauer Remix) (featuring Kučka)	Harley Streten; Geoffrey Earley; Laura Jane Lowther	Streten; Earley; Lowther; Harry Rodrigues	Baauer	3:35
2.	"Like Water" (Jacques Greene Remix) (featuring MNDR)	Streten; Amanada Lucille Warner; Peter Wade Keusch	Streten; Warner; Keusch; Philippe Aubin-Dionne	Jacques Greene	3:45
3.	"Take a Chance" (Kölsch Remix) (featuring Little Dragon)	Streten; Yukimi Nagano; Erik Bodin; Fredrik Wallin; Hakan Wirenstrand	Streten; Nagano; Bodin; Wallin; Wirenstrand; Rune Reilly Kölsch	Kölsch	9:36
4.	"Tiny Cities" (Lindstrøm & Prins Thomas Remix) (featuring Beck)	Streten; Beck Hansen	Streten; Hansen; Hans-Peter Lindstrøm; Thomas Hermansen	Lindstrøm & Prins Thomas	10:26
5.	"Lose it" (Golden Features Remix) (featuring Vic Mensa)	Streten; Victor Mensah	Streten; Mensah; Thomas Stell	Golden Features	3:27
6.	"Lose It" (Naderi Remix) (featuring Vic Mensa)		Streten; Mensah; Shawn Naderi	Naderi	2:56
7.	"Never Be Like You" (Disclosure Remix) (featuring Kai)	Streten; Earley; Alessia De Gasperis-Brigante	Streten; Earley; Gasperis-Brigante; Howard Lawrence; Guy Lawrence	Disclosure	6:11
8.	"Never Be Like You" (Martin Solveig Remix) (featuring Kai)		Streten; Earley; Gasperis-Brigante; Martin Picandet	Martin Solveig	4:44
9.	"Never Be Like You" (Teengirl Fantasy Remix) (featuring Kai)		Streten; Earley; Gasperis-Brigante; Logan Takahashi; Nicholas Weiss	Teengirl Fantasy	4:22
10.	"Never Be Like You" (Wave Racer Remix) (featuring Kai)		Streten; Earley; Gasperis-Brigante; Thomas Purcell	Wave Racer	3:28
11.	"Say It" (Anna Lunoe Remix) (featuring Tove Lo)	Streten; Ebba Tove Nilsson; Daniel Johns	Streten; Nilsson; Johns; Anna Lunoe	Lunoe	4:11
12.	"Say It" (Clean Bandit Remix) (featuring Tove Lo)		Streten; Nilsson; Johns; Jack Patterson; Luke Patterson	Clean Bandit	5:30
13.	"Say It" (Illenium Remix) (featuring Tove Lo)		Streten; Nilsson; Johns; Nicholas D. Miller	Illenium	4:27
14.	"Say It" (SG Lewis Remix) (featuring Tove Lo)		Streten; Nilsson; Johns; Samuel G. Lewis	SG Lewis	4:57
15.	"Say It" (STWO Remix) (featuring Tove Lo)		Streten; Nilsson; Johns; Steven Vidal	STWO	4:26
Total length:					TBA
