= Rushing Back =

2019 single by Flume featuring Vera Blue

Single by Flume featuring Vera Blue
- Released: 27 September 2019
- Studio: Los Angeles
- Length: 3:51
- Label: Future Classic
- Songwriters: Harley Streten; Celia Pavey; Eric J Dubowsky; Sophie Cates
- Producer: Flume

Flume singles chronology
"Let You Know" (2019)	"Rushing Back" (2019)	"The Difference" (2020)

Vera Blue singles chronology
"The Way That You Love Me" (2019)	"Rushing Back" (2019)	"Nobody Like You" (2020)

"Rushing Back" is a song by Australian electronic musician Flume featuring Australian singer/songwriter Vera Blue. It was released on 27 September 2019 via Future Classic. The track was first premiered on radio Triple J on 26 September 2019 after being performed live for the first time during Flume's Osheaga Festival set in August. "Rushing Back" reached a new peak of number 8 on the ARIA Singles Chart in the week after Triple J's Hottest 100 of 2019 aired, where it was voted in second place. The song features on FIFA 20.

At the AIR Awards of 2020, the song was nominated for Best Independent Dance, Electronica or Club Single.

The song was nominated for Most Performed Australian Work and won Most Performed Dance Work at the APRA Music Awards of 2021

== Background ==
Speaking on Triple J, Flume said it was Vera Blue's 'vocal gymnastics' that really caught his attention, particularly on her 2015 single "Hold". Flume said "I heard her song 'Hold' and I was like, this is insane. Her voice, the melody... As soon as I heard that I was like, we have to find this person and work with her."

In 2016, Flume collaborated with Vera Blue (and Vince Staples, Kučka and Ngaiire) and covered Ghost Town DJ's' "My Boo" for Triple J's Like a Version.

In 2019, Flume and Vera Blue met in Los Angeles to record the song.

Blue said "Harley (a.k.a. Flume) threw me a bunch of ideas and I was riffing over the songs, just humming melodies that came to my head based on how the song made me feel. There were a couple of ideas I resonated with but I really fell in love with this one as soon as I heard the first few chords, which eventually blossomed into 'Rushing Back'."

The song was performed live in August 2019 during Flume's Lollapalooza Festival performance, in Chicago.

== Critical reception ==
Debbie Carr from Triple J complimented the song's sound, stating: "'Rushing Back' feels like a natural evolution for the Sydney producer, taking the jagged, futuristic production we first heard from him back on Skin and pushing it into a new melodic earworm territory."

Lake Schatz from Consequence of Sound was positive of the collaboration, writing: "The two drum up a contagious chemistry, as Vera Blue's featherweight voice swiftly floats above, below, and around Flume's warping, bent production. It's almost as though they've imagined the feeling of 'rushing back' but in audio form."

== Music video ==
An official music video was uploaded onto YouTube on 13 November 2019. It was directed by longtime Flume collaborator, Jonathan Zawada. The video features Flume and Vera Blue seated next to each other in the same graffiti-coloured Nissan that was used as the cover art and visualizer for Flume's Hi This Is Flume mixtape. Dancing Astronaut called the video "a visual appendage to the relationship reflection inherent in the lyrics".

== Track listing ==
=== Original version ===
1. "Rushing Back" – 3:51

=== Petit Biscuit remix ===
1. "Rushing Back" (Petit Biscuit remix) – 3:09

=== MJ Cole remix ===
1. "Rushing Back" (MJ Cole remix) – 4:44

== Personnel ==
Credits adapted from Tidal.

- Harley Streten – songwriting, production
- Celia Pavey – songwriting
- Eric J Dubowsky – songwriting, vocal production, mixing
- Sophie Cates – songwriting

== Charts ==
=== Weekly charts ===
Chart (2019–2020)	Peak position
Australia (ARIA)	8
Australia Dance (ARIA)	1
Belgium (Ultratip Bubbling Under Flanders)	24
New Zealand Hot Singles (RMNZ)	2
US Hot Dance/Electronic Songs (Billboard)	12

=== Year-end charts ===
Chart (2019)	Position
Australian Artist (ARIA)	19
Chart (2020)	Position
Australia (ARIA)	27
US Hot Dance/Electronic Songs (Billboard)	75

== Certifications ==
Region	Certification	Certified units/sales
Australia (ARIA)	6× Platinum	420,000^{‡}
New Zealand (RMNZ)	2× Platinum	60,000^{‡}
^{‡} Sales+streaming figures based on certification alone.

== Release history ==
Region	Date	Version	Format(s)	Label
Various	27 September 2019	Original	Digital download; streaming	Future Classic
Various	25 October 2019	Petit Biscuit Remix	Digital download; streaming	Future Classic
Various	15 November 2019	MJ Cole Remix	Digital download; streaming	Future Classic
