= Friends (Flume song) =

2019 song by Australian electronic musician Flume

Single by Flume featuring Reo Cragun

from the EP Quits
- Released: 27 March 2019
- Length: 4:14
- Label: Future Classic
- Songwriters: Reo Cragun; Harley Edward Streten
- Producer: Flume

Flume singles chronology
"Hyperreal" (2017)	"Friends" (2019)	"Let You Know" (2019)

"Friends" is a song by Australian musician Flume, released on 27 March 2019 through Future Classic. It features vocals from American rapper Reo Cragun, and was released a week after the Hi This Is Flume mixtape.

== Reception ==
Music Feeds said the song "marks a return to [Flume's] more experimental side".

== Charts ==
Chart (2019)	Peak position
Australia (ARIA)	72
New Zealand Hot Singles (RMNZ)	8
US Hot Dance/Electronic Songs (Billboard)	18
