= Hyperreal (Flume song) =

Single by Flume featuring Kučka

from the album Skin Companion EP 2
- Released: 5 May 2017
- Genre: House
- Length: 4:14
- Label: Future Classic

Flume singles chronology
"Say It" (2016)	"Hyperreal" (2017)	"Friends" (2019)

"Hyperreal" is a song by Australian musician Flume. It features vocals from Kučka. It was released on 5 May 2017. The song is included on the vinyl release of Skin Companion EP 2 (2017).

It marks the third collaboration between Flume and Kučka, following "Smoke & Retribution" and "Numb & Getting Colder", on Skin.

== Reception ==
A Triple J reviewer said "It's a thumping, glitchy club track packed with bass and off kilter syncopation. Flume has woven explosions, claps, distortion and kick drums together with Kučka's soprano to create an unnerving, deep dark beast."

== Charts ==
Chart (2017)	Peak position
Australia (ARIA)	60
New Zealand Heatseekers (RMNZ)	6
US Hot Dance/Electronic Songs (Billboard)	36
