= The Difference (Flume and Toro y Moi song) =

2020 single by Flume and Toro y Moi

Single by Flume with Toro y Moi
- Released: 11 March 2020
- Length: 2:19
- Label: Future Classic
- Songwriters: Harley Streten; Chaz Bear
- Producer: Flume

Flume singles chronology
"Rushing Back" (2019)	"The Difference" (2020)	"Say Nothing" (2022)

Toro y Moi singles chronology
"Dark and Handsome" (2019)	"The Difference" (2020)	"Money Up" (2020)

"The Difference" is a song by Australian electronic musician Flume and American singer/songwriter and producer Toro y Moi, released through Future Classic on 11 March 2020 as a standalone single. The song featured in an advert for Apple AirPods Pro.

Upon release, Flume wrote, "We made this song between a day at my place in LA and a day at Chaz's spot in Oakland. This was our first time working together." Flume said he has been a fan of Toro y Moi "for a while" and lists the song "Talamak" as a "long time favourite".

The song was nominated for the Grammy Award for Best Dance Recording at the 63rd Annual Grammy Awards (2021).

== Music video ==
An official music video premiered on YouTube on 11 March 2020. It was directed by long-time Flume collaborator, Jonathan Zawada.

== Track listings ==
=== Original version ===
1. "The Difference" – 2:20

=== Remixes EP ===
1. "The Difference" (Jon Hopkins remix) – 5:26
2. "The Difference" (Picard Brothers remix) – 5:05
3. "The Difference" (High Contrast remix) – 3:54
4. "The Difference" (Willaris K. remix) – 3:19
5. "The Difference" (Willaris K. dub) – 4:55
6. "The Difference" (extended) – 3:57

== Charts ==
=== Weekly charts ===
Chart (2020–2021)	Peak position
Australia (ARIA)	23
Belgium (Ultratip Bubbling Under Flanders)	26
New Zealand Hot Singles (RMNZ)	7
US Hot Dance/Electronic Songs (Billboard)	10

=== Year-end charts ===
Chart (2020)	Position
US Hot Dance/Electronic Songs (Billboard)	38
Chart (2021)	Position
Australian Artist (ARIA)	31

== Certifications ==
Certifications for "The Difference"
Region	Certification	Certified units/sales
New Zealand (RMNZ)	2× Platinum	60,000^{‡}
^{‡} Sales+streaming figures based on certification alone.

== Release history ==
Region	Date	Version	Format(s)	Label
Various	11 March 2020	Original	Digital download; streaming	Future Classic
Various	26 June 2020	Remixes	Digital download; streaming	Future Classic
