= APRA Music Awards of 2017 =

Annual Australian music awards

- Date: 3 April 2017
- Location: Sydney, Australia
- Website: apraamcos.com.au/awards/

The Australasian Performing Right Association Awards of 2017 (generally known as APRA Awards) are a series of related awards which include the APRA Music Awards, Art Music Awards, and Screen Music Awards. The APRA Music Awards of 2017 was the 35th annual ceremony by the Australasian Performing Right Association (APRA) and the Australasian Mechanical Copyright Owners Society (AMCOS) to award outstanding achievements in contemporary songwriting, composing and publishing. The ceremony was held on 3 April 2017 at the International Convention Centre Sydney. The host for the ceremony was Julia Zemiro, presenter on SBS-TV's RocKwiz.

The Art Music Awards ceremony was held on 22 August 2017 in Sydney and are presented by APRA, AMCOS and the Australian Music Centre (AMC), "to recognise achievement in the composition, performance, education and presentation of Australian art music. Art music covers activity across contemporary classical music, contemporary jazz and improvised music, experimental music and sound art" The Screen Music Awards were issued on 13 November at the Melbourne Recital Centre by APRA, AMCOS and Australian Guild of Screen Composers (AGSC), which "acknowledges excellence and innovation in the field of screen composition."

In mid-March nominations for the APRA Music Awards were announced on multiple news sources: Flume received the most with four nominations, he went on to win three awards. Archie Roach was honoured by the Ted Albert Award for Outstanding Services to Australian Music. Songwriter of the Year was Flume.

== Presenters ==
At the APRA Music Awards ceremony on 3 April 2017, aside from the host, Julia Zemiro, the presenters were Bernard Fanning, Hayley Mary (of the Jezabels), Tex Perkins and Morgan Evans (of Solver).

== APRA Music Awards ==
=== Blues & Roots Work of the Year ===
Title and/or artist	Writer(s)	Publisher(s)	Result
"It's not too Late" – Archie Roach	Archie Roach, Craig Pilkington	Mushroom Music	Nominated
"Second Guess" – Ash Grunwald	Ash Grunwald	Mushroom Music	Nominated
"The Pain" – Robbie Miller	Robbie Miller, Nathan Morrison	—N/a	Won
"Notion" – Tash Sultana	Tash Sultana	—N/a	Nominated
"Lonesome Road" – Russell Morris	Russell Morris, Shannon Bourne	BMG	Nominated

=== Breakthrough Songwriter of the Year ===
Title and/or artist	Writer(s)	Publisher(s)	Result
Gang of Youths	David Le'aupepe	Universal Music Publishing Australia	Nominated
Rüfüs	Jon George, James Hunt and Tyrone Lindqvist	Kobalt Music Publishing o.b.o. Sweat It Out	Nominated
Meg Mac	Meg Mac	Mushroom Music o.b.o. BMG	Nominated
King Gizzard and the Lizard Wizard	Stu MacKenzie	Mushroom Music	Nominated
Troye Sivan	Troye Sivan Mellet	—N/a	Won

=== Country Work of the Year ===
Title and/or artist	Writer(s)	Publisher(s)	Result
"Burn Baby Burn" – Kirsty Lee Akers	Kirsty Lee Akers, Trey Bruce	Native Tongue Music Publishing o.b.o. Round Hill Songs and Kid Drum Music	Nominated
"This Crazy Life" – The Wolfe Brothers	Phil Barton, Brodie Rainbird, Bruce Wallace, Nicholas Wolfe, Thomas Wolfe	Warner/Chappell Music o.b.o. Better Boat Music/ Perfect Pitch Publishing	Nominated
"The Truth Walks Slowly (In the Countryside)" – O'Shea featuring Rob Hirst	Rob Hirst, Jay O'Shea, Mark O'Shea	Sony/ATV Music Publishing, Orient Pacific Music	Nominated
"Greatest Companion" – Aleyce Simmonds	Aleyce Simmonds	Kobalt Music Publishing o.b.o. Checked Label Services	Won
"Call Me Crazy" – Travis Collins	Travis Collins, Damien Leith	ABC Music Publishing	Nominated

=== Dance Work of the Year ===
Title and/or artist	Writer(s)	Publisher(s)	Result
"This Girl" – Kungs vs Cookin' on 3 Burners	Jake Mason, Lance Ferguson, Ivan Khatchoyan	Universal Music Publishing, BMG o.b.o. Origin Music Publishing	Nominated
"The Trouble with Us" – Nick Murphy featuring Marcus Marr	Nicholas Murphy, Marcus Annesley	Mushroom Music	Nominated
"Say It" – Flume featuring Tove Lo	Harley Streten (a.k.a. Flume), Julian Hamilton, Daniel Johns, Tove Lo	Kobalt Music Publishing o.b.o. Future Classic, Sony/ATV Music Publishing, Warner/Chappell Music o.b.o. Wolf Cousins	Nominated
"Keeping Score" – LDRU featuring Paige IV	Sarah Aarons, Drew Carmody	Sony/ATV Music Publishing Allegro (Australia), BMG	Nominated
"Never Be like You" – Flume featuring Kai	Harley Streten (a.k.a. Flume), Kai, Geoffrey Earley	Kobalt Music Publishing o.b.o. Future Classic / Native Tongue Music Publishing o.b.o. Songs of SMP / Warner/Chappell Music o.b.o. Artist 101	Won

=== International Work of the Year ===
Title and/or artist	Writer(s)	Publisher(s)	Result
"Can't Stop the Feeling!" – Justin Timberlake	Justin Timberlake, Martin Sandberg, Johan Schuster	Universal Music Publishing o.b.o. DWA Songs, Universal Music Publishing MGB o.b.o. Tennman Tunes, Kobalt Music Publishing o.b.o. MXM Music	Nominated
"Hello" – Adele	Adele Adkins, Greg Kurstin	Universal Music Publishing o.b.o. Melted Stone, Sony/ATV Music Publishing o.b.o. Kurstin Music	Won
"Love Yourself" – Justin Bieber	Justin Bieber, Benny Blanco, Ed Sheeran	Universal/MCA Music Publishing o.b.o. Bieber Time, Universal/MCA Music Publishing o.b.o. Please Don’t Forget to Pay Me Music, Sony/ATV Music Publishing	Nominated
"Ocean Drive" – Duke Dumont	Timucin Aluo, Adam Dyment, Jay Norton, Henry Ritson	Kobalt Music Publishing o.b.o. Funky Wonton, Mushroom Music o.b.o. BMG, Kobalt Music Publishing	Nominated
"Sorry" – Justin Bieber	Justin Bieber, Julia Michaels, Sonny Moore, Justin Tranter, Michael Tucker	Universal/MCA Music Publishing o.b.o. Bieber Time, Warner/Chappell Music o.b.o. Thanks for the Songs Richard, Kobalt Music Publishing o.b.o. Copaface, Warner/Chappell Music o.b.o. Justin S School for Girls, Kobalt Music Publishing o.b.o. Michael Diamond Music, Native Tongue Music Publishing o.b.o. These are Songs of Pulse	Nominated

=== Most Played Australian Work ===
Title and/or artist	Writer(s)	Publisher(s)	Result
"Cheap Thrills" – Sia	Sia Furler, Greg Kurstin	Sony/ATV Music Publishing / Sony/ATV Music Publishing o.b.o. Kurstin Music	Nominated
"In My Blood" – The Veronicas	Anthony Egizii, David Musumeci, Lisa Origliasso, Jessica Origliasso	Sony/ATV Music Publishing / Universal Music Publishing	Nominated
"The Trouble with Us" – Nick Murphy featuring Marcus Marr	Nicholas Murphy, Marcus Annesley	Mushroom Music	Nominated
"Say It" – Flume featuring Tove Lo	Harley Streten (p.k.a. Flume), Julian Hamilton, Daniel Johns, Tove Lo	Kobalt Music Publishing o.b.o. Future Classic, Sony/ATV Music Publishing, Warner/Chappell Music o.b.o. Wolf Cousins	Nominated
"Never Be like You" – Flume featuring Kai	Harley Streten (p.k.a. Flume), Kai, Geoffrey Earley	Kobalt Music Publishing o.b.o. Future Classic, Native Tongue Music Publishing o.b.o. Songs of SMP, Warner/Chappell Music o.b.o. Artist 101	Won

=== Most Played Australian Work Overseas ===
Title and/or artist	Writer(s)	Publisher(s)	Result
"Riptide" – Vance Joy	James Keogh (a.k.a. Vance Joy)	Kobalt Music Publishing o.b.o. Future Classic, Native Tongue Music Publishing o.b.o. Songs of SMP, Warner/Chappell Music o.b.o. Artist 101	Won

=== Overseas Recognition Award ===
Writer(s)	Publisher(s)	Result
Samuel Dixon	—N/a	Won

=== Pop Work of the Year ===
Title and/or artist	Writer(s)	Publisher(s)	Result
"Alive" – Sia	Sia Furler, Adele Adkins, Tobias Jesso	Sony/ATV Music Publishing, Universal Music Publishing o.b.o. Melted Stone, Universal/MCA Music Publishing	Nominated
"Black & Blue" – Guy Sebastian	Guy Sebastian, Jaymes McFarland	Universal Music Publishing, Warner/Chappell Music o.b.o. Jaymes Young Music	Nominated
"Youth" – Troye Sivan	Alex Hope, Troye Sivan, Bram Inscore, Alexandra Hughes, Brett McLaughlin	Sony/ATV Music Publishing Allegro (Aust), Kobalt Music Publishing o.b.o. I Am Bram, Kobalt Music Publishing o.b.o. Dream Machine and Prescription Songs, Sony/ATV Music Publishing o.b.o. Bob Ocho	Nominated
"Cheap Thrills" – Sia	Sia Furler, Greg Kurstin	Sony/ATV Music Publishing, Sony/ATV Music Publishing o.b.o. Kurstin Music	Won
"In My Blood" – The Veronicas	Anthony Egizii, David Musumeci, Lisa Origliasso, Jessica Origliasso	Sony/ATV Music Publishing / Universal Music Publishing	Nominated

=== Rock Work of the Year ===
Title and/or artist	Writer(s)	Publisher(s)	Result
Fall Together – The Temper Trap	Richard Cooper, Dougy Mandagi, Justin Parker	Sony/ATV Music Publishing, Mushroom Music	Nominated
"Hold Me Back" – The Rubens	Scott Baldwin, David Kahne, Elliott Margin, Izaac Margin, Samuel Margin, William Zeglis	Mushroom Music o.b.o. Ivy League Music, Kobalt Music Publishing o.b.o. E Equals Music	Nominated
"I'd Go with You Anywhere" – Birds of Tokyo	Ian Berney, Ian Kenny, Glenn Sarangapany, Adam Spark, Adam Weston	Mushroom Music	Won
"The Good Life" – Thirsty Merc	Jon Hume, Rai Thistlethwayte	Sony/ATV Music Publishing	Nominated
"Wasting Time" – Bernard Fanning	Bernard Fanning, Nick DiDia	—N/a	Nominated

=== Song of the Year ===
Title and/or artist	Writer(s)	Publisher(s)	Result
"Adore" – Amy Shark	Amy Shark, Mark Landon p.k.a. M-Phazes	Universal Music Publishing	Nominated
"Come Home (Cardinal Pell)" – Tim Minchin	Tim Minchin	Kobalt Music Publishing o.b.o. Navel Enterprises	Nominated
"Pool Party" – Julia Jacklin	Julia Jacklin	Mushroom Music	Nominated
"Satan" – D.D Dumbo	Oliver Perry (a.k.a. D.D Dumbo)	Mushroom Music	Won
"Skeleton Tree" – Nick Cave and the Bad Seeds	Nick Cave, Warren Ellis	Kobalt Music Publishing	Nominated

=== Songwriter of the Year ===
- Harley Streten p.k.a. Flume

=== Ted Albert Award for Outstanding Services to Australian Music ===
- Archie Roach

=== Urban Work of the Year ===
Title and/or artist	Writer(s)	Publisher(s)	Result
"1955" – Hilltop Hoods featuring Montaigne & Tom Thum	DJ Debris (Barry Francis), MC Pressure (Daniel Smith), Suffa (Matthew Lambert), Andrew Burford	Sony/ATV Music Publishing / Universal Music Publishing	Nominated
"For Good" – Remi featuring Sampa the Great	Aderemi Kolawole, Justin Smith, Sampa Tembo	Sony/ATV Music Publishing Allegro (Aust)	Nominated
"Papercuts" – Illy featuring Vera Blue	Alasdair Murray (a.k.a. Illy), Mark Landon p.k.a. M-Phazes, Thomas Macken, Celia Pavey	Mushroom Music o.b.o. WAU Publishing, Universal Music Publishing, Native Tongue Music Publishing, Universal Music Publishing o.b.o. Canal Music	Won
"Long Loud Hours" – Urthboy featuring Bertie Blackman	Tim Levinson, Pip Norman, Luke Dubber, Angus Stuart, Ray Charles	BMG / Mushroom Music / Sony/ATV Music Publishing /Warner/Chappell Music	Nominated
"Higher" – Hilltop Hoods featuring James Chatburn	DJ Debris (Barry Francis), MC Pressure (Daniel Smith), Suffa (Matthew Lambert)	Sony/ATV Music Publishing, Universal Music Publishing	Nominated

== Art Music Awards ==
=== Instrumental Work of the Year ===
Title	Composer	Performer	Result
Aisles	Austin Buckett	Australian Art Orchestra and Ensemble Offspring	Nominated
Diomira	Peter Knight	Australian Art Orchestra	Nominated
How Forests Think	Liza Lim	Elision, Wu Wei (sheng, soloist), Carl Rosman (conductor)	Won
Moon Fire	Jessica Wells	Lyn Fuller	Nominated

=== Jazz Work of the Year ===
Title	Composer	Performer	Result
Intrusions	Eugene Ball	Monash Art Ensemble	Nominated
Moons of Jupiter	Paul Grabowsky	The Paul Grabowsky Sextet	Nominated
Now Noise	Tom O'Halloran	Memory of Elements	Won
Still Night	Andrea Keller	Vince Jones, Andrea Keller, Stephen Magnusson, Gian Slater, Julien Wilson	Nominated

=== Orchestral Work of the Year ===
Title	Composer	Performer	Result
Frog and Star Cycle	Ross Edwards	Amy Dickson (saxophone), Colin Currie (percussion), Sydney Symphony Orchestra, Lothar Koenigs (conductor)	Nominated
Raga	Andrew Ford	Zane Banks (guitar), Adelaide Symphony Orchestra, Benjamin Northey (conductor)	Nominated
Serenade for Tenor, Saxophone and Orchestra ("My Dear Benjamin")	Lyle Chan (music), Benjamin Britten and Wulff Scherchen (text)	Andrew Goodwin (tenor), Michael Duke (saxophone), Queensland Symphony Orchestra, Paul Kildea (conductor)	Won
The Witching Hour	Elena Kats-Chernin	Australian World Orchestra, Alexander Briger (conductor), soloists	Nominated

=== Vocal / Choral Work of the Year ===
Title	Composer / librettist	Performer	Result
Agnus Dei (Do Not Stand at My Grave and Weep)	Paul Stanhope / Mary Elizabeth Frye; Requiem Mass	Adelaide Chamber Singers, Carl Crossin (conductor)	Nominated
Permission to Speak	Kate Neal / Tamara Saulwick	Chamber Made Opera (Gian Slater, Georgie Darvidis, Josh Kyle, Edward Fairlie)	Nominated
Tree of Codes	Liza Lim	Ensemble Musikfabrik; Cologne Opera, Clement Power (conductor), Massimo Furlan (director)	Won
With Love and Fury	Judith Wright (text), with music by Katie Noonan, Paul Dean, Andrew Ford, Paul Grabowsky, Iain Grandage, David Hirschfelder, Elena Kats-Chernin, John Rodgers, Richard Tognetti, Carl Vine,	Katie Noonan & the Brodsky Quartet	Nominated

=== Performance of the Year ===
Title	Composer / librettist	Performer	Result
Agnus Dei (Do Not Stand at My Grave and Weep)	Paul Stanhope / Mary Elizabeth Frye; Requiem Mass	Adelaide Chamber Singers, Carl Crossin (conductor)	Nominated
Cerulean Orbits	Jane Stanley	Benjamin Beilman, Andrew Tyson	Nominated
"Piano Concerto"	Yitzhak Yedid	Michael Kieran Harvey	Nominated
"Piano Sonata"	Chris Dench	Peter de Jager	Won

=== Award for Excellence by an Individual ===
Individual	Work	Result
Cat Hope	Performance, academia, composition, mentoring and advocacy	Nominated
Daryl Buckley	Over thirty years of contribution to the international projection of Australian contemporary performance, ideas and practice	Won
David Bridie	Music project: a Bit na Ta	Nominated
Tos Mahoney	Work with New Music in Western Australia in 2016	Nominated

=== Award for Excellence by an Organisation ===
Organisation	Work	Result
Speak Percussion	2016 program and sustained contribution to Australian music	Won
Synergy & Taikoz Limited	Activities and achievements of the two new music ensembles, Synergy Percussion and Taikoz	Nominated
Tura New Music	2016 program and sustained contribution to Australian music for over 30 years	Nominated
Zephyr Quartet	Performances, collaborations, commissions and recordings in 2016	Nominated

=== Award for Excellence in Music Education ===
Organisation / individual	Work	Result
Goulburn Regional Conservatorium, Canberra Symphony Orchestra, University of Canberra	The Goulburn Concerto	Nominated
Moorambilla Voices	2016 season	Won
Sydney Symphony Orchestra	Annual teacher-training program, TunED-Up!	Nominated
West Australian Symphony Orchestra	2016 education program	Nominated

=== Award for Excellence in a Regional Area ===
Organisation / individual	Work	Result
Four Winds	2016 Easter Festival	Nominated
Ngarukuruwala	Ngiya awungarra (I Am Here, Now), ethnographic recordings of Tiwi song material	Nominated
Primal Dance Company	Modern dance work, Footmarks	Nominated
Tura New Music	2016 Regional Program	Won

=== Award for Excellence in Experimental Music ===
Organisation / individual	Work	Result
Clocked Out, Bruce Wolfe, Jocelyn Wolfe	The Piano Mill Project	Won
J.O.L.T. Arts	The Book of Daughters mini-festival	Nominated
Matthias Schack-Arnott	Percussion duo, Anicca	Nominated
Robert Curgenven	Climata, a performance, installation and recording project	Nominated

=== Award for Excellence in Jazz ===
Organisation / individual	Work	Result
Andrea Keller	Creation, presentation and release of contemporary jazz in 2016	Won
Daniel Susnjar	Afro-Peruvian Jazz musical activities including album Moth to a Flame and Australian / US touring	Nominated
Ross McHenry	Child of Somebody, various performances	Nominated
Stu Hunter	Recording, world premiere and national tour of The Migration	Nominated

=== Distinguished Services to Australian Music ===
Organisation / individual	Result
John Pochée	Won

== Screen Music Awards ==
=== Feature Film Score of the Year ===
Title	Composer	Result
Jasper Jones	Antony Partos	Won
Berlin Syndrome	Bryony Marks	Nominated
2:22	James Orr, Lisa Gerrard	Nominated
Alien: Covenant	Jed Kurzel	Nominated

=== Best Music for an Advertisement ===
Title	Composer	Result
Volkswagen: "Tiguan 2017"	Elliott Wheeler	Nominated
Hennessy: "Classivm"	Josh Abrahams, Davide Carbone	Nominated
Good Mood Water: "The Bad Choice"	Lindsay Jehan, Nathan Cavaleri	Won
Swisse: "Power Your Passion"	Matteo Zingales	Nominated

=== Best Music for Children's Television ===
Title	Composer	Result
Beat Bugs: "When I'm 64"	Daniel Denholm, Daniel Johns	Nominated
Bottersnikes and Gumbles: "The Ugly Pageant"	Michael Szumowski	Won
The Deep: "Tartaruga"	Nerida Tyson-Chew	Nominated
Kazoops: "Middle of Somewhere"	Scott Langley	Nominated

=== Best Music for a Documentary ===
Title	Composer	Result
Deep Water: The Real Story	Antony Partos	Nominated
Whiteley	Ash Gibson Greig	Won
Monsieur Mayonnaise	Cezary Skubiszewski	Nominated
Mother with a Gun	Dale Cornelius	Nominated

=== Best Music for a Mini-Series or Telemovie ===
Title	Composer	Result
Shaun Micallef's Stairway to Heaven	Ash Gibson Greig	Nominated
Barracuda	Bryony Marks	Won
High Life	Sarah Blasko	Nominated

=== Best Music for a Short Film ===
Title	Composer	Result
Sarah Chong Is Going to Kill Herself	Aaron Kenny	Nominated
Face	Jonathan Bush	Nominated
Last Tree Standing	Me-Lee Hay	Won
Red	Tom Schutzinger	Nominated

=== Best Music for a Television Series or Serial ===
Series or Serial	Episode title	Composer	Result
Australian Survivor	—N/a	David Barber, Jonathon Bush, Helena Czajka, Justin Shave, Charlton Hill	Nominated
The Get Down	—N/a	Elliott Wheeler	Won
Seven Types of Ambiguity	—N/a	Stephen Rae, Jonathan Wilson	Nominated
The Code	—N/a	Roger Mason	Nominated

=== Best Original Song Composed for the Screen ===
Song title	Work	Composer	Result
"Power"	The Get Down	Baz Luhrmann, Donna Missal, Homer Steinweiss, Elliott Wheeler	Nominated
"Atlas in Your Eye"	Jasper Jones	Dustin Tebbutt	Nominated
"Visible"	The Pretend One	Hayden Calnin	Nominated
"Torchlight"	Don't Tell	Missy Higgins	Won

=== Best Soundtrack Album ===
Title	Composer	Result
Jasper Jones	Antony Partos	Nominated
Monsieur Mayonnaise	Deborah Morgan, Cezary Skubiszewski	Nominated
Alien: Covenant	Jed Kurzel	Won
Assassin's Creed	Jed Kurzel	Nominated

=== Best Television Theme ===
Title	Composer	Result
Fox League Super Saturday	Briggs, Justin Shave, Charlton Hill	Won
Rosehaven	Kit Warhurst	Nominated
Skinford	Michael Lira	Nominated
High Life	Sarah Blasko	Nominated

=== Most Performed Screen Composer – Australia ===
Composer	Result
Adam Gock, Dinesh Wicks	Won
Damian de Boos-Smith	Nominated
Jay Stewart	Nominated
Neil Sutherland	Nominated

=== Most Performed Screen Composer – Overseas ===
Composer	Result
Adam Gock, Dinesh Wicks	Nominated
Jay Stewart	Nominated
Neil Sutherland	Won
Nerida Tyson-Chew	Nominated

=== Distinguished Services to the Australian Screen ===
Organisation / individual	Result
Martin Armiger	Won
