= Skin Companion EP 2 =

EP by Flume
- Released: 17 February 2017
- Genre: Electronic
- Length: 16:43
- Label: Mom + Pop; Future Classic
- Producer: Harley Streten

Flume chronology
Skin Companion EP 1 (2016)	Skin Companion EP 2 (2017)	Skin: The Remixes (2017)

Skin Companion EP 2 is an extended play (EP) by Australian electronic musician Flume. The four-track EP was written during the production of Flume's studio album, Skin, and was released digitally on 17 February 2017, by Future Classic as a companion to the album. The EP was released on vinyl on 5 May 2017.

Upon release, Flume said: "I'm really happy with how the Companion EP 2 has come out. There's so many tracks I've been wanting to get off my chest for so long now and I think it's kinda the end of the Skin kinda campaign and it's a nice way to end it because it's instrumental stuff, there's some vocal collabs... I'm just really proud of how it's turned out."

The EP features vocals from American rapper Pusha T, Moses Sumney, and Glass Animals frontman Dave Bayley.

== Critical reception ==
Professional ratings
Review scores
Source	Rating
Pitchfork	5.8/10
Sputnikmusic	3.1/5

Skin Companion EP 2 received mixed to positive reviews by critics.

== Track listing ==
Note: All tracks were produced by Flume.

No.	Title	Writer(s)	Length
1.	"Enough" (featuring Pusha T)	Harley Streten; Terrance Thornton	3:12
2.	"Weekend" (featuring Moses Sumney)	Streten; Sumney; Marcus Whale	4:19
3.	"Depth Charge"	Streten	5:08
4.	"Fantastic" (featuring Dave Bayley of Glass Animals)	Streten; Bayley	4:04

Vinyl

Side A

1. "Hyperreal" (featuring Kučka)
2. "Enough"
3. "Depth Charge"

Side B

1. "Weekend"
2. "Fantastic

== Charts ==
Chart (2017)	Peak position
Australia (ARIA)	67
US Top Dance/Electronic Albums (Billboard)	11

== Release history ==
Region	Date	Format	Label
Australia	17 February 2017	Digital download	Future Classic
Australia	5 May 2017	Vinyl	Future Classic
