= Hi This Is Flume =

Mixtape by Flume
- Released: 20 March 2019
- Genre: Experimental; IDM; wonky; electronica
- Length: 38:10
- Label: Future Classic
- Producer: Flume; Eprom; Sophie; HWLS; JPEGMafia

Flume chronology
| Skin: The Remixes (2017) | Hi This Is Flume (2019) | Quits (2019) |

Hi This Is Flume is the first mixtape released by Australian electronic musician Flume. It was released on 20 March 2019 by Future Classic. The mixtape follows the release of Flume's Skin: The Remixes in 2017. Hi This Is Flume was announced on 19 March 2019, only days after Flume's documentary When Everything Was New was released to YouTube. Flume began working on the album away from the public eye from 2017, following his commercially-successful album Skin and its world tour.

The mixtape is a more experimental record compared to Flume's previous work, and contains features from several of his favourite artists such as Slowthai, JPEGMafia and frequent collaborator Kučka, as well as guest production from HWLS, Sophie and Eprom. A remix of Sophie's "Is It Cold in the Water?" from her 2018 album Oil of Every Pearl's Un-Insides by Flume and Eprom is also included. An accompanying visual for the mixtape directed by Jonathan Zawada, who had also designed the artwork for Flume's album Skin, was released and premiered on YouTube on release day. The mixtape was released to positive reviews, with music critics complimenting its experimental style.

The mixtape was nominated for Best Dance/Electronic Album at the 62nd Annual Grammy Awards, becoming Flume's second nomination for the category and third overall.

== Background and recording ==
Following the release of his second album Skin in May 2016, Flume embarked on a world tour in support of the album for the rest of the year. He further released Skin Companion EP 1 in November of that year and Skin Companion EP 2 in February 2017, and also worked with Vince Staples and Lorde on their respective albums Big Fish Theory and Melodrama in June. After Skin touring responsibilities wrapped up in January 2018, he subsequently decided to keep a low public profile as he was "working so hard" that he started "to hate music [and] touring" and "needed to live a normal life for a bit".

While working on the mixtape, Flume felt that he needed to create a record with a more experimental sound in order to go "back to [his] roots", and added that he changed his style because he was bored of doing "the same thing over and over" and "people copy [him]". In an AMA on Reddit, he revealed that the production on Hi This Is Flume was far more difficult than on his previous records as there was "way more detail", though "the ideas flowed more easily on [the mixtape] than Skin". He also revealed that the synth used most on the mixtape was "good old sylenth1", but that "a fair bit of synplant" was also used, while the distortion plug used is the "Black Box Analog Design HG-2".

Speaking to Triple J, Flume explained that, through the mixtape, he wanted to expose listeners "to more left-field electronic music", as well as artists such as Slowthai, JPEGMafia, Eprom, and Sophie. He additionally discussed working with the featured artists on the record. He revealed that he discovered English rapper Slowthai through the track "T N Biscuits", immediately decided that he wanted to "work with this guy", and consequently traveled to the United Kingdom to record the song "High Beams" with him. The recording session in Los Angeles with American hip hop artist JPEGMafia lasted one day, and when the two had finished writing the first verse, Flume suggested that the rapper "just talk shit for the rest of it", to which JPEGMafia replied "Alright, I'm great at that!" The two also enjoyed "mess[ing] around on all the hardware" together in the studio which included a Roland TR-8 drum machine and the Prophet X sampler/synthesizer. Flume, Scottish producer Sophie and Kučka began working on the track "Voices" when they met during the Skin world tour in 2016 at the Sidney Myer Music Bowl in Melbourne, when Sophie created sounds from an Elektron FM Synth, which Flume sampled for the track's beat.

== Musical style ==
Hi This Is Flume has been characterised by critics as an experimental, IDM, wonky and electronica mixtape. Christina Hernandez of Dancing Astronaut described the record as a "complete change of pace from Skin" due to its abstract musical style, and Flume's "most idiosyncratic work to date"; Steve Kavakos of Australian GQ noted that the mixtape "falls away from any mainstream elements" and marks a return to the sound found on Flume's eponymous debut album. It consists of seventeen tracks, many of them under two minutes long, with each ending transitioning smoothly into the beginning of the next.

== Release and promotion ==
Just before New Year's Day of 2019, Flume posted a picture of himself holding a glass of wine in a swimming hole in Byron Hinterland, and wrote that he would "be back in your life" that year. On 13 March, Flume made available the documentary Flume: When Everything Was New on his YouTube channel; the film had previously been released in April 2018 on Apple Music alongside Sleepless: The Story of Future Classic, which documented the rise of Flume's record label.

On 19 March, Flume announced on social media that he would release a mixtape, titled Hi This Is Flume, through his label Future Classic the next day. On the same day, a snippet of a then-unknown track from his upcoming record soundtracked a teaser for the Chicago Lollapalooza music festival, for which he was announced as a headliner. On 20 March, Flume released the mixtape, accompanied by a 42-minute visual directed by Jonathan Zawada, who had previously created the artwork for Flume's second album Skin.

== Critical reception ==
Professional ratings
Review scores
| Source | Rating |
|---|---|
| Highsnobiety | 3.5/5 stars |
| Pitchfork | 7.6/10 |
| Resident Advisor | 3.6/5 |

Hi This Is Flume was met with positive reviews from music critics, who commended the experimental nature of the record. Owen Myers of Pitchfork called the mixtape "both philosophically and sonically, an inflection point" and wrote that "Hi This Is Flume is how he breaks apart his now-familiar sound, zooming in on the different layers and looking at them in new ways." Jake Indiana of Highsnobiety deemed the record "extremely refreshing and light-footed" and highlighted "High Beams" and "How to Build a Relationship" as its standout songs, but added that aside from those tracks "the mixtape struggles to feel especially fresh." Kat Bein of Billboard wrote that "Flume still has that wonky quality, but [Hi This Is Flume] rightly reinvents his sound with some fresh bang", and claimed that the mixtape would "be the best 38 minutes of your day, hands down."

Christina Hernandez of Dancing Astronaut commended "the amount of impact Flume manages to squeeze into such a short time span" in her review, and wrote that "the advanced sound design and clear step outside his creative cavern showcase a matured talent who continues to carve new niches in the modern electronic sphere where no artist formerly thought to look." Sam Van Pykeren of Mother Jones hailed the mixtape as a "fantastic, angry, and existential mess of computer sounds" and called it "a reinvigorating work of electronic music." Andrew Ryce of Resident Advisor welcomed Flume's turn to the experimental, calling it "a welcome step towards somewhere less comfortable," and stated that while "cynical listeners might see it as trend-hopping, [...] there's a boldness to Streten's production that gives it something more than just commercial appeal." Junkee writer Richard S. He named the release one of the best records of the first half of 2019, writing that it "feels like it's improvised, almost freestyled directly from [Flume's] brain".

== Chart performance ==
In the United States, Hi This Is Flume debuted at number nine on the Dance/Electronic Albums chart with 3,000 equivalent album units sold, making it Flume's third entry in the top 10 of that chart. It reached its peak of number two on the chart the following week. It entered the US Billboard 200 chart at its peak of number 185. In New Zealand and Flume's native Australia, the mixtape debuted at its peak of number 11 on the countries' respective album charts.

== Track listing ==
All tracks written and produced by Harley Streten, except where noted.

| No. | Title | Writer(s) | Producer(s) | Length |
|---|---|---|---|---|
| 1. | "Hi This Is Flume" | | | 0:28 |
| 2. | "Ecdysis" | | | 1:44 |
| 3. | "High Beams" (with HWLS featuring Slowthai) | Streten; Justin Elwin; Tyron Frampton | Flume; HWLS | 3:23 |
| 4. | "Jewel" | | | 3:13 |
| 5. | "╜φ°⌂▌╫§╜φ°⌂▌╫§╜φ°⌂▌╫§╜φ°⌂▌╫§╜φ°⌂▌" | | | 0:33 |
| 6. | "Dreamtime" | | | 2:14 |
| 7. | "Is It Cold in the Water?" (by Sophie; Flume and Eprom Remix) | Sophie Xeon; Cecile Believe | Sophie; Flume (remixer); Eprom (remixer) | 4:47 |
| 8. | "How to Build a Relationship" (featuring JPEGMafia) | Streten; Barrington Hendricks | Flume; JPEGMafia | 3:04 |
| 9. | "Wormhole" | | | 2:22 |
| 10. | "Voices" (featuring Sophie and Kučka) | Streten; Xeon; Laura Lowther | Flume; SOPHIE | 1:54 |
| 11. | "MUD" | | | 1:28 |
| 12. | "Upgrade" | | | 1:46 |
| 13. | "71m3" | | | 1:20 |
| 14. | "Vitality" | | | 1:39 |
| 15. | "Daze 22.00" | | | 2:15 |
| 16. | "Amber" | | | 2:23 |
| 17. | "Spring" (with Eprom) | Streten; Alexander Dennis | Flume; Eprom | 3:37 |
| Total length: | | | | 38:00 |

== Charts ==
| Chart (2019) | Peak position |
|---|---|
| Australian Albums (ARIA) | 11 |
| Australian Dance Albums (ARIA) | 1 |
| Australian Independent Albums (AIR) | 1 |
| Belgian Albums (Ultratop Flanders) | 27 |
| Belgian Albums (Ultratop Wallonia) | 139 |
| Dutch Albums (Album Top 100) | 87 |
| French Albums (SNEP) | 186 |
| Lithuanian Albums (AGATA) | 60 |
| New Zealand Albums (RMNZ) | 11 |
| US Billboard 200 | 185 |
| US Top Dance Albums (Billboard) | 2 |

== Release history ==
| Region | Date | Format | Label | Ref. |
|---|---|---|---|---|
| Worldwide | 20 March 2019 | Digital download; streaming | Future Classic | |
| Worldwide | 20 August 2019 | LP + 7'' single (pre-order) | Future Classic | |
| Worldwide | 20 August 2019 | LP | Future Classic | |
| Worldwide | 2020 | LP (green) | Future Classic | |
