= Quits (EP) =

EP by Flume and Reo Cragun
- Released: 2 August 2019
- Length: 9:18
- Label: Future Classic

Flume chronology
Hi This Is Flume (2019)	Quits (2019)	Palaces (2022)

Singles from Quits
- 1. "Friends" Released: 27 March 2019

Quits is an extended play (EP) by Australian electronic musician Flume and Reo Cragun. The EP was released on 2 August 2019.

Upon release, Flume told Zane Lowe from Apple Music Beats 1 "This EP is us as a friendship, hanging out, just making tracks, having too many good songs and we're like, 'We need to get these out into the world', so we were like, 'Let's just do an EP.'"

The EP was certified gold in Australia in December 2019.

== Reception ==
Caitlin Medcalf from Music Feeds said "The three-track affair traverses three different sounds for each artist, the title-track... offering up slow, RnB vibes with Flume's signature squelchy, syncopated production driving this one forward. 'Levitate' sees Cragun's vocal do the talking and finally, the EP closes out with 'Friends'".

Katie Bain from Billboard said "The three-track EP is a fresh update of Flume's classic spandex beats sound, with Cragun featured heavily over all three tracks."

== Track listing ==
No.	Title	Length
1.	"Quits"	2:32
2.	"Levitate"	3:30
3.	"Friends" (edit)	3:16
Total length:		9:18

== Certifications ==
Region	Certification	Certified units/sales
Australia (ARIA)	Gold	35,000^{‡}
^{‡} Sales+streaming figures based on certification alone.

== Release history ==
Region	Date	Format	Label
Australia	2 August 2019	Digital download, streaming	Future Classic
