= Lyn Fuller =

Australian carillonist (born 1946)

Lyn Fuller OAM (born 1946) is the national carillonist of Australia.

== Early life and education ==
One of five carillonists in Canberra, Fuller first started playing the carillon after seeing a 1994 newspaper advertisement to study the instrument at the ACT School of Music. She also studied piano at the Canberra School of Music and holds AMusA and LMusA degrees in music from the Australian Music Examinations Board.

== Career ==
Fuller is the Lead Carillonist at the National Capital Authority (NCA)'s National Carillon on Queen Elizabeth II Island in Lake Burley Griffin. She writes her own music and has had two of her pieces published in the United States. Additionally, she has given the world premieres of carillon works by Matthew Hindson, Jessica Wells, and Becky Llewellyn. In 2013, Fuller was awarded an AUD $62,600 contract for the provision of national carillon services to Australia.

Fuller has served as president of the Carillon Society of Australia since 2008. She is a Teaching Fellow at the Australian National University School of Music and plays in the Canberra Symphony Orchestra.

In 2017, Fuller was nominated for an APRA Award, Art Music Awards category, Instrumental Work of the Year, for her performance of Jessica Wells' electroacoustic carillon work Moon Fire, in the Australasian Performing Right Association Awards of 2017.

In the 2021 Queen's Birthday Honours Fuller was awarded the Medal of the Order of Australia.

== Musical works ==
Fuller published "Exit Stage Left" in 2013 to honor the retirement of Jill Forrest AM, University Carillonist of the War Memorial Carillon at the University of Sydney. The piece includes text for a one-act play and describes Forrest's final performance.

Fuller's "Witches' Wake" was published by American Carillon Music Editions in 2009.
