= Some Minds =

Single by Flume featuring Andrew Wyatt
- Released: 29 May 2015
- Recorded: 2015
- Genre: Experimental
- Length: 4:23
- Label: Future Classic
- Songwriter(s): Flume; Andrew Wyatt

Flume singles chronology
"Drop the Game" (2013)	"Some Minds" (2015)	"Never Be like You" (2016)

Andrew Wyatt singles chronology
"Somebody to Love Me" (2010)	"Some Minds" (2015)

"Some Minds" is a song by Australian musician Flume. It features vocals from Andrew Wyatt. It was released on 29 May 2015, by Future Classic. The song peaked at number 27 on the ARIA Singles Chart.

The Clemens Habicht directed music video was nominated for Best Video at the ARIA Music Awards of 2015.

== Background ==
Following the release of his Australian number one self-titled album in 2013, Flume has been on the road and providing remixes to a number of songs, including Lorde's "Tennis Court", Arcade Fire's "Afterlife", Disclosure's "You & Me" and Sam Smith's "Lay Me Down". Flume revealed in April 2015 that he'd just spent a few months in the studio "working on a bunch of new material," though he did not reveal any firm details on his awaited sophomore album. Whilst talking about "Some Minds", Flume said he presented his work-in-progress to Wyatt in New York City. "Andrew was writing things in his own head while I played the song over and over then after about an hour he jumped up and said 'stop' and launched into singing this amazing chorus melody. He was singing in gibberish into his phone, then fleshed out the lyrics of the chorus and verses. I finished it off with the crazy ending further down the line, a few months later."

== Track listing ==
- Digital download
1. "Some Minds" – 4:23

== Music video ==
The music video for "Some Minds" was released on 28 May 2015. The video is the result of collaboration between Flume, the Sydney Opera House and Clemens Habicht. It features dance and choreography from The Australian Ballet member Callum Linnane. Granted exclusive access to the iconic Australian building, the shoot took place throughout the night one Saturday in April.

== Charts ==
Chart (2015–2016)	Peak position
Australia (ARIA)	27
US Hot Dance/Electronic Songs (Billboard)	19

== Certifications ==
Certifications for "Some Minds"
Region	Certification	Certified units/sales
New Zealand (RMNZ)	Gold	15,000^{‡}
^{‡} Sales+streaming figures based on certification alone.
