= Wrestling (album) =

Studio album by Kučka
- Released: 30 April 2021
- Recorded: 2017–2020
- Genre: Pop; dance; electronic
- Length: 38:24
- Label: LuckyMe; Soothsayer
- Producer: Kučka (exec.) (Note: All tracks); Vegyn (Note: Track 2); Flume (Note: Track 3); Nosaj Thing (Note: Track 10); Exmoor Emperor (Note: Track 12)

Kučka chronology
Unconditional (2015)	Wrestling (2021)	Can You Hear Me Dreaming? (2024)

Singles from Wrestling
- 1. "Drowning" Released: 18 September 2019; 2. "Real" Released: 20 November 2019; 3. "Contemplation" Released: 23 July 2020; 4. "Ascension" Released: 14 October 2020; 5. "No Good for Me" Released: 10 February 2021; 6. "Eternity" Released: 14 April 2021

Wrestling is the debut album by English-Australian singer and producer Kučka. It was released on 30 April 2021 via LuckyMe and Soothsayer. It was preceded by the release of singles "Drowning" and "Real" in 2019, "Contemplation", and "Ascension" in 2020, and "No Good for Me" and "Eternity" in 2021. The album cover and the singles' music videos were shot and directed by Kučka's wife and creative director, Dillon Howl.

The album features co-production from Australian musician and longtime collaborator Flume, British producer Vegyn, American producer Nosaj Thing, and UK duo Exmoor Emperor.

At the AIR Awards of 2022, the album was nominated for Best Independent Dance or Electronica Album or EP.

== Background ==
Kučka signed to British label LuckyMe in 2017, after issuing previous releases via independent Australian labels.

Initially, the plan was to release Wrestling by the end of 2020, but it was pushed back to 2021 for unstated reasons.

Kučka states that she had to say no to multiple collaborations, including one with South Korean boy band BTS, in order to finish work on the record.

In an interview with Queued in March 2020, Kučka shared details on the track "Eternity", which the interviewer described as "her most meaningful song to date". She wrote the song three weeks before meeting her wife, Dillon Howl:

I was writing about this kind of dream or something, and then everything that I wrote kind of came true when we met and were first dating. It was like a weird premonition, and I only realized it when I went back to the song and was like, 'Holy shit! This happened, and this happened, and this happened'

On 2 April, Kučka shared a free download link to "Joyride" on her website, accessible by pre-saving the album.

== Reception ==
Professional ratings
Review scores
Source	Rating
Exclaim!	8/10
The Skinny	4/5 stars
Loud and Quiet	7/10

Mathias Pageau of Exclaim! said Wrestling "might soon cement her pop star status" and praised Kučka for "again and again prov[ing] her talent for complex hooks and catchy melodies". Leigh Hill of OUTinPerth praised the album for her voice and futuristic sound. They also called her album "the result of a tough but fruitful transition in her life, spanning love, conflict, sexuality and maturity".

== Track listing ==
All tracks written and produced by Kučka, except where noted.

Wrestling track listing
No.	Title	Writer(s)	Producer(s)	Length
1.	"Wrestling"			1:46
2.	"Contemplation"	Laura Jane Lowther; Joseph Thornally	Kučka; Vegyn	3:27
3.	"Drowning"		Kučka; Harley Edward Streten	3:45
4.	"Ascension"			3:21
5.	"Afterparty"			2:30
6.	"Joyride"			3:19
7.	"Your World"			3:23
8.	"Sky Brown"	Lowther; Henry Jacob Sebastian White; Nathan Charles Feddo	Kučka; Exmoor Emperor	3:27
9.	"No Good for Me"			3:35
10.	"Real"	Lowther; Jason Chung	Kučka; Nosaj Thing	3:25
11.	"Eternity"			3:24
12.	"Patience"			2:53
Total length:				38:24

== Release history ==
Release history and formats for Wrestling
Region	Date	Format	Label	Catalogue	Ref.
Various	30 April 2021	Digital download; streaming	LuckyMe; Soothsayer	Not applicable	
Various	30 April 2021	CD	LuckyMe		
Various	30 April 2021	LP	Soothsayer		
Australia	30 April 2021	LP	Soothsayer	LM069LP	
