= Flowerkid =

- Birth name: Flynn Sant
- Origin: Sydney, New South Wales, Australia
- Genres: Alternative
- Occupations: Singer; record producer
- Instrument: Vocals
- Years active: 2018–present
- Labels: Warner Music Australia
- Website: www.flowerkidmusic.com

Flynn Sant (born c.2001), known professionally as Flowerkid (stylised in all lowercase) is an Australian producer, singer/songwriter from Sydney, New South Wales.

His songs "Boy with the Winfields and the Wild Heart" and "Miss Andry" both received full rotation on Triple J in 2019.

== Early life ==
Flynn grew up in Western Sydney and left secondary school in year 10.

Sant grew up in a Catholic household completing his sacraments at a young age.

== Personal life ==
Sant is a trans man.

In an interview with the guardian, Sant says, "I was so little and all I could think was that I was a sinner. I was going to hell," in relation to his song "I Met The Devil At 4 Years Old". He explains how his trauma affected his spirituality from a young age.

== Musical style and influences ==
Sant cites Frank Ocean and Miley Cyrus as musical influences.

There is a link between Sant and Billie as their shared manager was "blown away" by Sants production skills

== Career ==
Sant signed a worldwide record deal to Warner Music, Wonderlick, Parlophone and Atlantic Records in 2020.

In November 2023, Flowerkid released Let It Be Enough.

== Discography ==
=== Extended Plays ===
List of EPs, with selected details
Title	Year
Everyone Has a Breaking Point	Released: 11 November 2021; Label: Warner Music Australia
Let It Be Enough	Released: 3 November 2023; Label: Warner Music Australia

=== Singles ===
List of singles, with year released and album name shown
Title	Year	Album
"Boy with the Winfields and the Wild Heart"	2018	non album single
"Miss Andry"	2020	Everyone Has a Breaking Point
"It's Happening Again" (featuring Kučka)	2021	Everyone Has a Breaking Point
"vodka orange juice"	2021	Everyone Has a Breaking Point
"Running Out of Time" (with Handsome and St. South)	2022	non album single
"Set Me Free"	2024	non album single

== Awards and nominations ==
=== Rolling Stone Australia Awards ===
The Rolling Stone Australia Awards are awarded annually by the Australian edition of Rolling Stone magazine for outstanding contributions to popular culture in the previous year.

Year	Nominee / work	Award	Result
2021	"Miss Andry"	Best Single	Nominated
