= Charles Murdoch (music producer) =

- Birth name: Charles Murdoch
- Also known as: Charlie Murdoch; Charlie Why!
- Born: ca. 1990 (age 34–35)
- Origin: Brisbane, Queensland, Australia
- Genres: Electronic
- Occupation: Record producer
- Years active: 2009–present
- Labels: Nose Candy, Future Classic

Charles Murdoch is an Australian electronic record producer and musician from Brisbane. As Charlie Why he worked as a DJ and musician. Why's debut six-track extended play, I was Deliciously Wired, was released in June 2010 on the Bang Gang label. He later signed to Future Classic Records. As a producer he works for Rio Lobotomy.

== Discography ==
=== Studio albums ===
- Point (Future Classic, 2015)

=== Singles and EPs ===
- "Weathered Straight" (Future Classic, 2013)
- "July" (Self-released, 2014)
- "User Using EP" (Future Classic, 2017)
- "super pop song not depressing" (Self-released, 2018)
- "New Pants" (Self-released, 2018)
- "WTBL EP" (Beats of No Nation, 2019)
- "IMPACT" (Self-released, 2020)
- "SHADE" (Self-released, 2020)
- "MAKE A MEANING" (Self-released, 2022)
- "Make Your Mind Up" (Self-released, 2023)
- "Free Time" (Self-released, 2023)

=== Extended plays ===
- I was Deliciously Wired (11 June 2010) – Bang Gang (BANG029)
- Weathered Straight (2013)

=== Internet releases ===
- OLD STUFF FROM SOUNDCLOUD (2021)

=== Remixes ===
- "No More (Charles Murdoch Remix)" on Imperfection / No More by Bodhi (Future Classic 2023)
- "Permission to Love (Charles Murdoch Remix" by Hayden James (Future Classic, 2013)
- "The Good Life (Charles Murdoch Remix)" by Elizabeth Rose (Self-released, 2014)
- "Uncertainty (Charles Murdoch Remix)" by Jagwar Ma (Future Classic, 2014)
- "Turbine Blue (Charles Murdoch Remix)" by Seekae (Future Classic, 2016)
- "Zoom (Charles Murdoch Remix)" on In A Million Years: 10 Year Anniversary Edition by Last Dinosaurs (Future Classic, 2022)

== Awards and nominations ==
2016: Berlin Music Video Awards, nominated in the Best Narrative Category for ' Frogs (feat. Ta-ku, Wafia & Hak) '
