= Smoke & Retribution =

Single by Flume featuring Vince Staples and Kučka

from the album Skin
- Released: 29 January 2016
- Recorded: 2015
- Genre: Electronic; experimental; hip hop
- Length: 4:01
- Label: Future Classic
- Songwriters: Harley Streten; Vince Staples; Laura Jane Lowther
- Producer: Streten

Flume singles chronology
"Never Be like You" (2016)	"Smoke & Retribution" (2016)	"Say It" (2016)

Vince Staples singles chronology
"Norf Norf" (2015)	"Smoke & Retribution" (2016)	"All Nite" (2016)

Kučka singles chronology
"Flux 98" (2015)	"Smoke & Retribution" (2016)	"My Boo" (2016)

"Smoke & Retribution" is a song by Australian DJ and record producer Flume. It features vocals from American rapper Vince Staples and Australian singer Kučka. It made its debut on Zane Lowe's Beats 1 radio show and was released on 29 January 2016, by Future Classic. The track is taken from Flume's second studio album, Skin.

== Background ==
Flume explained that he had started work on this song in the back of a van on the way to Las Vegas in mid-2015. Flume said, "It wasn't originally intended to have rap on it. Vince and I got to meet in person for the first time in L.A. in September, and that's when I showed him the beat... a few weeks later he sent back new verses for it. I was really happy, I love the tone of his voice... Similar story with Kučka's involvement in the track... she's got a lot of talent and I'm hoping to work a lot more with her in the future."

== Critical reception ==
In a positive review, Ryan Middleton of Music Times said "In 'Smoke & Retribution' Flume continues to show growth away from his oft-copied Australian synth-heavy sound for a track that is more conducive to a rapper, but also remains familiar to what Flume fans know the Australia producer for. He adds in quirky 8-bit synths, video game sounds and a jerky beat that molds to the sensibilities of Staples and Kučka." Eric Torres of Pitchfork described the track as a "thrilling makeover" of electro music.

Consequence of Sound said "Here, synths flicker and flare as guest collaborators Vince Staples and Kučka unfurl lines both swaggering and hypnotic."

== Charts ==
Chart (2016)	Peak position
Australia (ARIA)	23
New Zealand Heatseekers (Recorded Music NZ)	6
UK Singles (Official Charts Company)	183
US Hot Dance/Electronic Songs (Billboard)	18

== Certifications ==
Region	Certification	Certified units/sales
Australia (ARIA)	Gold	35,000^{‡}
^{‡} Sales+streaming figures based on certification alone.
