= Kučka =

Australian singer and record producer

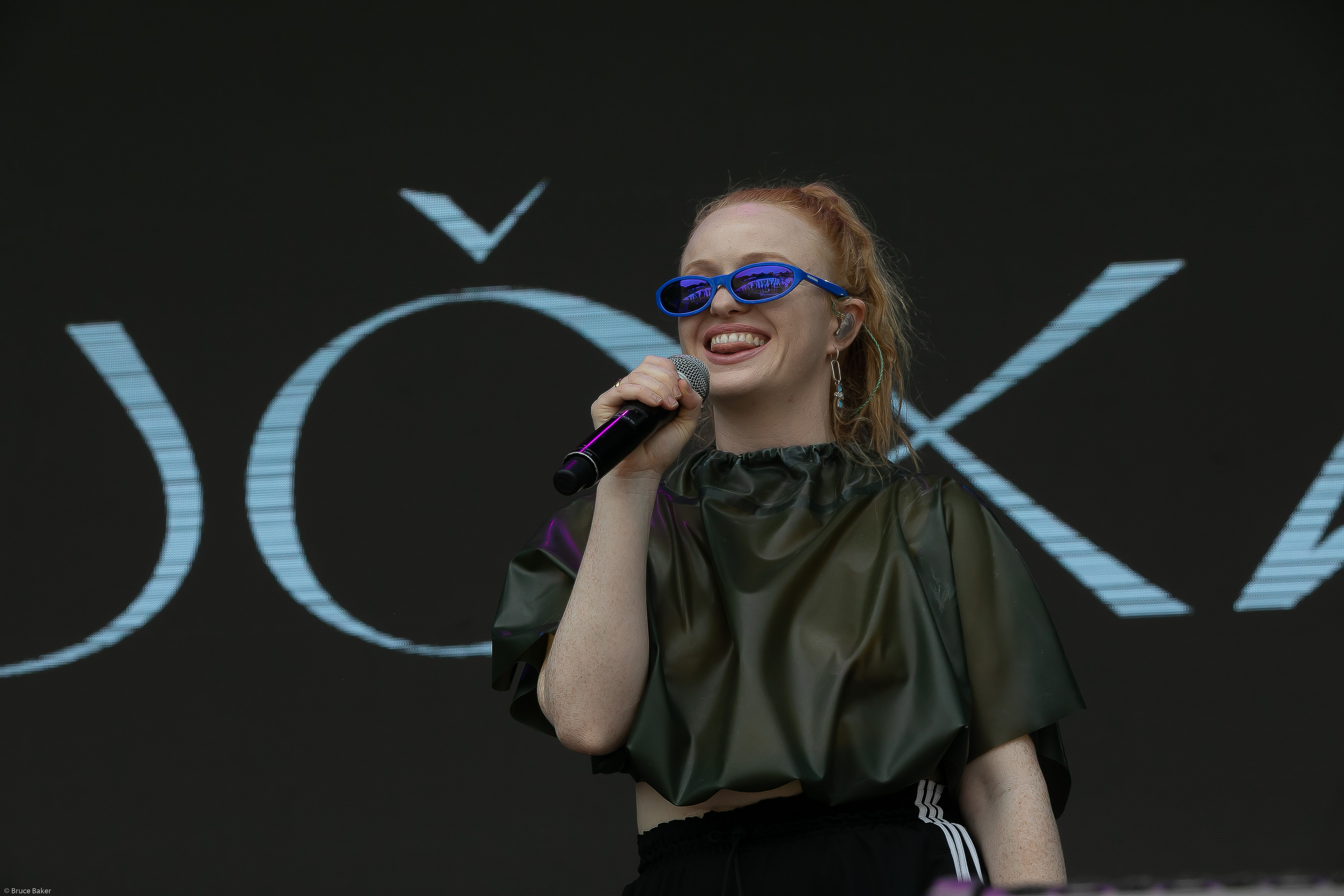
- Kučka performing live in 2020

Background information
- Born: Laura Jane Lowther; Liverpool, Merseyside, England
- Origin: Perth, Western Australia, Australia
- Genres: Synth-pop; electropop; ambient pop; electronic
- Years active: 2012–present
- Labels: LuckyMe; Soothsayer; Inertia
- Website: www.kucka.co

Laura Jane Lowther, known professionally as Kučka (Note: /kʊtʃkə/ KUUCH-kə, Serbo-Croatian: [kûtʃka].) (Serbo-Croatian for 'bitch'; stylised in all caps), is a British-born Australian singer and producer. Lowther is known for her solo works, in addition to her collaborations with Flume, Vince Staples and ASAP Rocky. She has been praised for her "dreamy, forward-thinking, electronic pop songs" and her "delicate beats, and ethereal vocals". Her debut album, Wrestling, was released on 30 April 2021.

== Early life ==
Laura Jane Lowther was born in Liverpool, England, and grew up there. She said she found it a strange place to grow up in, and said "I wasn't very creative when I was there." At 16, Kučka moved to Perth, Australia. On her parents' computer, Lowther began to create music using GarageBand. At that time, she was creating emo music, which contained "angsty lyrics with guitar looping". She notes Shaking the Habitual by the Knife as an inspiration: "I used to thrash Shaking the Habitual when I worked at a cinema in Perth. I'd be so worried that the bosses would come in because it gets pretty wild."

== Career ==
Lowther, adopting the stage name Kučka, released her debut eponymous EP in 2012. It was later re-released on an Australian experimental label, Wood and Wire. She collaborated with A$AP Rocky in 2013, singing background vocals for some tracks on his debut album, Long. Live. ASAP. In the same year, she received five nominations and one win from the West Australian Music Industry Awards (WAMis) for the release of the single "Unconditional". Her sophomore EP, Unconditional, was released in 2015. For the EP, Kučka received Best Electronic Act and Best Experimental Act at the 2015 WAMis, as well as 4 other nominations. The EP was compared to FKA Twigs, and called "shimmery, warm and intimate."

In the following years, Kučka was featured on multiple Flume albums. She appeared on 2016's Skin, on the tracks "Smoke & Retribution" and "Numb & Getting Colder", and again on 2017's "Hyperreal". She was also featured on 2019's Hi This Is Flume, on "Voices". Her debut album Wrestling was released on 30 April 2021 and featured co-production from Flume, Nosaj Thing, Vegyn, and Exmoor Emperor.

In March 2023, Kučka announced the Cry Cry Cry Australian Tour 2023, alongside the release of a single of the same name.

In May 2024, Kučka announced her second album Can You Hear Me Dreaming? would be released on 12 July 2024.

== Personal life ==
As of 2017, Kučka resides in California. She has been in a relationship with Dillon Howl since 2017. They married in 2019. Howl is Kučka's creative director and co-directed all of Wrestling's music videos. Kučka's stage name is the Serbo-Croatian word for "bitch" (Serbo-Croatian Cyrillic: Кучка). It was given to her as an affectionate nickname by a Serbian friend.

== Discography ==
=== Studio albums ===
List of studio albums, with release date and label shown
Title	Album details
Wrestling	Released: 30 April 2021; Label: LuckyMe, Soothsayer; Formats: CD, LP, digital download, streaming
Can You Hear Me Dreaming?	Released: 12 July 2024; Label: LuckyMe, Soothsayer; Formats: CD, LP, digital download, streaming

=== Extended plays ===
List of EPs, with release date and label shown
Title	EP details
Kučka	Released: 2 August 2012; Label: Wood & Wire; Formats: CD, digital download
Unconditional	Released: 14 August 2015; Label: Midnight Feature, Inertia; Formats: CD, LP, digital download, streaming

=== Singles ===
==== As lead artist ====
List of singles, with year released and album name shown
Title	Year	Album
"Unconditional"	2014	Unconditional
"Divinity"	2014	Unconditional
"Recovery"	2015	Unconditional
"Flux 98"	2015	Unconditional
"Drowning"	2019	Wrestling
"Real"	2019	Wrestling
"Contemplation"	2020	Wrestling
"Ascension"	2020	Wrestling
"No Good for Me"	2021	Wrestling
"Eternity"	2021	Wrestling
"Beautiful"	2021	Non-album singles
"Down by the Water"	2021	Non-album singles
"Messed Up"	2022	Can You Hear Me Dreaming?
"Not There"	2022	Can You Hear Me Dreaming?
"Cry Cry Cry"	2023	Can You Hear Me Dreaming?
"All the Things She Said"	2023	Non-album single
"One More Night" (featuring Flume)	2024	Can You Hear Me Dreaming?
"Wasting Time (Til the End of the World)"	2024	Can You Hear Me Dreaming?
"Heavyweight"	2024	Can You Hear Me Dreaming?
"Heaven"	2024	Can You Hear Me Dreaming?
"Fun"	2024	Non-album singles
"Never Give Up on Loving You"	2025	Non-album singles
"Gravity" (with Baauer)	2026	U

==== As featured artist ====
List of singles, with year released, selected chart positions, certifications, and album name shown
Title	Year	Peak chart positions			Certifications	Album
Title	Year	AUS	NZ	US Dance	Certifications	Album
"Long Live ASAP" (ASAP Rocky featuring Kučka)	2013	—	—	—		Long. Live. ASAP
"Nothing's Forever" (Paces featuring Kučka)	2015	—	—	—		Vacation
"Walk with Me" (Cosmo's Midnight featuring Kučka)	2015	—	—	—	ARIA: Gold	Moments
"Adhedoniac" (Andrei Eremin featuring Kučka)	2015	—	—	—		Pale Blue
"Smoke & Retribution" (Flume featuring Vince Staples and Kučka)	2016	23	— (Note: "Smoke & Retribution" did not enter the NZ Top 40 Singles Chart, but peaked at number six on the Heatseekers Chart.)	18	ARIA: Gold; RMNZ: Gold	Skin
"Queensbury Rules" (Dro Carey featuring Kučka)	2016	—	—	—		Dark Zoo
"My Boo" (Flume featuring Vince Staples, Ngaiire, Vera Blue and Kučka)	2016	—	—	—		Non-album single
"Hyperreal" (Flume featuring Kučka)	2017	60	— (Note: "Hyperreal" did not enter the NZ Top 40 Singles Chart, but peaked at number six on the Heatseekers Chart.)	36	RMNZ: Gold	Skin Companion EP 1
"It's Happening Again" (Flowerkid featuring Kučka)	2021	—	—	—		TBA
"It's Our Destiny" (Imanu featuring Kučka)	2022	—	—	—		Unfold
"Escape" (Flume and Quiet Bison featuring Kučka)	2022	—	—	—		Palaces
"F1 Racer" (Mount Kimbie featuring Kučka)	2022	—	—	—		MK3.5: Die Cuts | City Planning
"Violet" (Machinedrum featuring Kučka)	2023	—	—	—		4#trax
"Chance on You" (Cosmo's Midnight featuring Kučka)	2024	—	—	—		Stop Thinking Start Feeling
"All in for You" (Logic1000 featuring Kučka)	2026	—	—	—		Confirmation!
"—" denotes a recording that did not chart or was not released.

=== Guest appearances ===
List of guest appearances, with year released, album name, and reference shown
Title	Year	Album	Ref.
"Pripyat (Part 2)" (Seth Sentry featuring Kučka)	2015	Strange New Past	
"Lyf" (Simo Soo featuring Kučka)	2015	Vitaminzzz	
"Backyard Plastic" (Simo Soo featuring Tobacco Rat and Kučka)	2015	Vitaminzzz	
"Nothing for You" (Charles Murdoch featuring Kučka)	2015	Point	
"First Light" (Milwaukee Banks featuring Kučka)	2016	Deep Into the Night	
"Numb & Getting Colder" (Flume featuring Kučka)	2016	Skin	
"Where Did That Go" (Zeds Dead featuring Kučka)	2016	Northern Lights	
"Dec 11" (Baauer featuring Kučka)	2017	LuckyMe Advent Calendar 17	
"Voices" (Flume featuring Sophie and Kučka)	2019	Hi This Is Flume	
"U_Want" (Machinedrum featuring Kučka)	2024	3FOR82	
"Fantasy" (Chris Stussy featuring Kučka)	2026	Lost, Found & Forgotten	

=== Songwriting and production credits ===
List of songwriting and production credits, with year released, artist(s), co-writers, co-producers, and reference shown
Title	Year	Artist(s)	Credits	Co-writer(s)	Co-producer(s)	Album	Ref.
"Make You Feel Good"	2016	Fetty Wap	Songwriter	Fetty Wap; Michael John Mule; Isaac John de Boni		Non-album single	
"Yeah Right"	2017	Vince Staples featuring Kendrick Lamar	Songwriter	Vince Staples; Sophie Xeon; Harley Streten; Kendrick Duckworth	Sophie; Flume	Big Fish Theory	

== Awards and nominations ==
=== AIR Awards ===
The Australian Independent Record Awards (commonly known informally as AIR Awards) is an annual awards night to recognise, promote and celebrate the success of Australia's Independent Music sector.

Year	Nominee / work	Award	Result	Ref.
2022	Wrestling	Best Independent Dance or Electronica Album or EP	Nominated	

=== WAM Song of the Year ===
The WAM Song of the Year was formed by the Western Australian Rock Music Industry Association Inc. (WARMIA) in 1985, with its main aim to develop and run annual awards recognising achievements within the music industry in Western Australia.

Year	Nominee / work	Award	Result
2012	"Polly (Serialkillersundays)"	Experimental Song of the Year	Won
2014	"Unconditional"	Electronica Song of the Year	Won
2014	"Unconditional"	Grand Prize	Won

=== West Australian Music Industry Awards ===
The West Australian Music Industry Awards (WAMIs) are annual awards presented to the local contemporary music industry, put on annually by the Western Australian Music Industry Association Inc (WAM). Kučka has won six awards.

Year	Nominee / work	Award	Result
2013	Kučka	Best Experimental Act	Won
2014	Kučka	Best Experimental Act	Won
2014	Kučka	Best Electronic Act	Won
2014	"Unconditional"	Best Single	Won
2015	Kučka	Best Experimental Act	Won
2015	Kučka	Best Electronic Act	Won
