= Seekae =

Australian electronic music group

- Origin: Sydney, New South Wales, Australia
- Genres: Indietronica; minimal; ghetto ambient; IDM; synth-pop; post-rock
- Years active: 2006–2016
- Labels: Future Classic; Rice Is Nice; Knitting Club
- Past members: Alex Cameron; George Nicholas; John Hassell
- Website: http://www.seekae.com/

Seekae was an Australian Sydney-based electronic music group. They formed the group under the name Commander Keen in reference to the early-'90s MS-DOS video game series, later changing the name to an elongated version of Commander Keen's initials (CK) after realising the name was taken by a Scottish band. They released their debut album The Sound of Trees Falling on People in 2008 and released the follow-up +Dome in 2011 and the EP 3 in 2012. The band released their third album The Worry in September 2014. The group parted ways in 2016, following a final show supporting The Jesus and Mary Chain.

== History ==
Alex Cameron and John Hassell met in high school and played in an indie rock band together. After finishing high school, Alex was reunited with George Nicholas with whom he went to primary school and after realising their common music tastes, the three began playing more experimental electronic music using George's MPC sampler and John's MicroKORG. The trio garnered critical acclaim from the Australian music press and were praised for their unique sound on the Sydney scene at the time, taking influence from UK post-dubstep producers Mount Kimbie and James Blake as well as being compared to fellow Australian electronic musicians PVT.

== Releases ==
=== The Sound of Trees Falling on People album ===
In 2008, Seekae's debut album The Sound of Trees Falling on People was released independently in Australia, then officially through Knitting Club Records and re-released when the band signed to Rice is Nice the following year. The album uses samples from instruments traditionally associated with indie and electronica such as piano, guitar and vocals, layered over 8-bit style synthesizers (most prevalent on the track Snax) and polyrhythmic electronic percussion. Rather than being a completely studio based production, Cameron wrote that the debut album "was a mixture of having written songs for live [shows], which we sort of shaped and morphed over time... After about a year of playing live we realized we had enough for a record". The album was the focus of much attention from Sydney radio station FBi, which named it album of the week in May and heralded Seekae as the best live act of 2009. The album was also responsible for Seekae winning the Soundclash grant from the Australian Arts Council, as well as receiving a 7.9/10 from popular Australian music journal Polaroids of Androids.

=== Remix EP ===
On 6 August 2009, the group self-released five remixes of various Australian artists digitally and on limited CD-R release. They launched the EP at the Oxford Art Factory in Sydney, playing alongside the artists who were featured on the EP.

=== +Dome album ===
The band's second album, +Dome was released in Australia on Rice is Nice and Popfrenzy on 25 March 2011. +Dome brought Seekae to the attention of international music media after the band toured the album locally, Europe, North America and Japan. Reviewers noted that the album highlights a greater influence from the UK bass and post-dubstep scenes as well as from '90s IDM artists such as Autechre. In response to the financial grant awarded to the band in 2009, the band were able to use more complex recording techniques, +Dome featuring more exotic instrumental acoustic recordings and a more sonically embellished production. NME gave +Dome a 7/10 and cited that despite the heavy electronic elements present, the rhythms feel "directed by human hands".

In 2012, a 12" pressing of the track "3" was released and sold alongside +Dome at Seekae's headline and support slot shows around Australia, featuring a club-edit of the track on the A-side (mixed by Seekae) and a remix of the track by Belgian techno/house producer Locked Groove (Hotflush Recordings).

=== The Worry album ===
On 12 September 2014, the band released their third album, The Worry, with Future Classic. It's the first LP the group has produced with the vocals of frontman, Alex Cameron. Their reason for wanting a lyrical album was to tell a story to the audience, and "eliminate any ambiguity", which they felt they could not do with instrumental music. Despite being a major departure from their previous sound, FasterLouder praised The Worry, giving it 8/10, saying "though The Worry has less flavours in the mix [when compared to +Dome] they turn out to be potent ones".

They disbanded in 2016, with Cameron pursueing a solo career.

== Discography ==
=== albums ===
Title	Details
The Sound Of Trees Falling On People	Released: 2008; Label: Knitting Club Records; Format: CD, digital download
+Dome	Released: 2011; Label: Rice Is Nice Records, Popfrenzy Records; Format: CD, digital download
The Worry	Released: 2014; Label: Future Classic; Format: CD, digital download, 2xLP

== Awards ==
=== AIR Awards ===
The Australian Independent Record Awards (commonly known informally as AIR Awards) is an annual awards night to recognise, promote and celebrate the success of Australia's Independent Music sector.

Year	Nominee / work	Award	Result
2011	themselves	Best Independent Artist	Nominated
2011	+Dome	Independent Album of the Year	Nominated
2011	+Dome	Best Independent Dance/Electronic Album	Nominated
2011	"Blood Bank"	Best Independent Dance/Electronic or Club Song or EP	Won
2015	The Worry	Best Independent Dance/Electronic Album	Nominated

=== J Award ===
The J Awards are an annual series of Australian music awards that were established by the Australian Broadcasting Corporation's youth-focused radio station Triple J. They commenced in 2005.

Year	Nominee / work	Award	Result
2014	The Worry	Australian Album of the Year	Nominated
