= Say It (Flume song) =

2016 single by Flume

Single by Flume featuring Tove Lo

from the album Skin
- B-side: "Wall Fuck"
- Released: 22 April 2016
- Genre: Wonky; future bass; dance-pop
- Length: 4:22
- Label: Future Classic; Mom + Pop
- Songwriters: Harley Streten; Tove Nilsson; Daniel Johns; J Hamilton
- Producers: Flume; Tove Lo; Daniel Johns

Flume singles chronology
"Smoke & Retribution" (2016)	"Say It" (2016)	"Hyperreal" (2017)

Tove Lo singles chronology
"Close" (2016)	"Say It" (2016)	"Cool Girl" (2016)

Music video
- "Say It" on YouTube

"Say It" is a song by Australian musician Flume, featuring the vocals from Swedish singer and songwriter Tove Lo. The track was released as the third single from his second studio album, Skin. It was premiered on Annie Mac's BBC Radio 1 show on 20 April 2016 and released on 22 April 2016, by Australian label Future Classic. The song performed successfully in Oceania, peaking at number five on the ARIA Singles Chart and number four on the RMNZ Singles Chart.

== Background ==
In an interview, Flume told Annie Mac that he was inspired to work with Lo after hearing her song "Habits (Stay High)" in a bar in Los Angeles following a Kanye West show. He contacted her the next day, and the two were able to write the song in two days.

Tove Lo adds, "I was in LA for a few days between tours when Harley [Flume] reached out to me about writing together. I've been a big fan of him for a long time so I pretty much ran over to his studio. He played me some ideas which one of them was the track for "Say It", and I just started vibing melodies over it and we put together something we loved. It was so relaxed and fun and kind of a new way for me to write. Very excited for people to hear it!" The song was written in the key of E Minor (recorded in D# Minor) and runs at a moderately fast tempo of 150 BPM.

== Critical reception ==
Billboard said, "'Say It' is a slower jam that embraces a highly sexual side of the duo, as Tove Lo sings of heartbreak and emotions that are overpowered by rising carnal temptations – 'break my bed to make me want to stay.' It's a relatable breakup story of a painful relationship that's stuck on repeat, complemented by a melodic chorus and soft beats."

== Track listings ==
Digital download

1. "Say It" – 4:22

Clean Bandit remix

1. "Say It" (Clean Bandit remix) – 5:30

== Charts ==
=== Weekly charts ===
Chart (2016–2017)	Peak position
Australia (ARIA)	5
Australia Dance (ARIA)	1
Belgium (Ultratop 50 Flanders)	36
Belgium (Ultratip Bubbling Under Wallonia)	8
Canada Hot 100 (Billboard)	61
Czech Republic Singles Digital (ČNS IFPI)	52
France (SNEP)	154
Ireland (IRMA)	77
New Zealand (Recorded Music NZ)	4
Scottish Singles Sales (Official Charts)	27
Slovakia Singles Digital (ČNS IFPI)	55
Sweden Heatseeker (Sverigetopplistan)	6
UK Dance (Official Charts)	23
UK Singles (Official Charts)	69
US Billboard Hot 100	60
US Pop Airplay (Billboard)	27

=== Year-end charts ===
Chart (2016)	Position
Australia (ARIA)	20
New Zealand (Recorded Music NZ)	21

== Certifications ==
Region	Certification	Certified units/sales
Australia (ARIA)	4× Platinum	280,000^{‡}
Canada (Music Canada)	Gold	40,000^{‡}
New Zealand (RMNZ)	5× Platinum	150,000^{‡}
United Kingdom (BPI)	Gold	400,000^{‡}
United States (RIAA)	Gold	500,000^{‡}
^{‡} Sales+streaming figures based on certification alone.

== Release history ==
Region	Date	Format	Version	Label	Ref.
Various	22 April 2016	Digital download	Original	Mom + Pop	
United States	11 October 2016	Contemporary hit radio	Original	Mom + Pop	
Various	19 October 2016	Digital download	Clean Bandit remix	Mom + Pop	
