= Never Be Like You =

2016 single by Flume

Single by Flume featuring Kai

from the album Skin
- Released: 16 January 2016
- Recorded: 2015
- Genre: Future bass; alternative R&B
- Length: 3:54
- Label: Future Classic; Mom + Pop
- Songwriters: Harley Streten; Alessia De Gasperis-Brigante; Geoffrey Patrick Earley
- Producers: Flume; kai; Earley

Flume singles chronology
"Some Minds" (2015)	"Never Be Like You" (2016)	"Smoke & Retribution" (2016)

Kai singles chronology
"Crawl" (2013)	"Never Be Like You" (2016)	"Mind" (2016)

Music video
- "Never Be like You" on YouTube

"Never Be Like You" is a song by Australian musician Flume, co-written by and featuring Canadian singer-songwriter Kai. It was released on 16 January 2016, by Future Classic, as the lead single of Flume's second studio album, Skin (2016). A remix by Disclosure was released on 4 March 2016, and a remix EP was released on 25 March 2016.

The song debuted at number 10 on the ARIA Singles Chart, later reaching number one and becoming Flume's first song to top the chart. The song also charted in Belgium, France, the United States and New Zealand, where it reached number two on the RMNZ Singles Chart.

At the ARIA Music Awards of 2016, the song won Best Pop Release, and was nominated for Song of the Year and Best Video. The song received a nomination for Best Dance Recording at the 2017 Grammy Awards. On 26 January 2017, the song was voted number one on the Triple J Hottest 100, 2016.

== Background ==
In a press release, Flume said, "kai and I were sending ideas back and forth online, then met up in New York and went into the studio. We laid down some chords and started an idea but weren't feeling inspired. So we went out into the night for a few hours and when we returned, it all started to come together."

== Critical reception ==
"Never Be Like You"
A sample of "Never Be Like You"

The song received positive reviews from critics.

Harley Brown of Spin said that "Diplo‑endorsed artist kai provides sumptuous and sterling vocals over sparkling half‑time drops, like an instrumental B‑side from [Justin Timberlake's 2006 album] FutureSex LoveSounds" and that "The new R&B look is a good one for Flume".

Billboard said "The song features Canadian chanteuse kai, smoothly balancing chilled out trap effects with spacey ambient noise and future bass elements, going hard and soft at once – a duality expressed in the lyrics as well, with kai begging forgiveness while asserting right to just be herself".

Rolling Stone named "Never Be like You" one of the 30 best songs of the first half of 2016: "The pop realization of the twisted techno mutations of cutting-edge acts like Flying Lotus, Rustie and Arca. "Never Be like You" skulks like Justin Timberlake's "My Love" caught in a parade of sparking, stuttering robotics."

In 2025, the song placed 26 in the Triple J Hottest 100 of Australian Songs.

== Track listings ==
Digital download

1. "Never Be Like You" – 3:54

Digital download (Disclosure remix)

1. "Never Be Like You" (Disclosure remix) – 6:11

Digital download (EP)

1. "Never Be Like You" – 3:54
2. "Never Be Like You" (Disclosure remix) – 6:11
3. "Never Be Like You" (Wave Racer remix) – 3:28
4. "Never Be Like You" (Teengirl Fantasy remix) – 4:22

Digital download (Martin Solveig remix)

1. "Never Be Like You" (Martin Solveig remix) – 4:44

== Charts ==
=== Weekly charts ===
Chart (2016)	Peak position
Australia (ARIA)	1
Australia Dance (ARIA)	1
Austria (Ö3 Austria Top 40)	48
Belgium (Ultratop 50 Flanders)	10
Belgium (Ultratop 50 Wallonia)	26
Canada Hot 100 (Billboard)	21
Czech Republic Singles Digital (ČNS IFPI)	26
France (SNEP)	27
Germany (GfK)	49
Hungary (Single Top 40)	36
Hungary (Stream Top 40)	33
Ireland (IRMA)	59
Italy (FIMI)	78
Latvia (Latvijas Top 40)	7
Netherlands (Single Top 100)	72
New Zealand (Recorded Music NZ)	2
Portugal (AFP)	63
Slovakia Singles Digital (ČNS IFPI)	17
Sweden Heatseeker (Sverigetopplistan)	1
Switzerland (Schweizer Hitparade)	33
UK Singles (Official Charts)	95
UK Dance (Official Charts)	22
US Billboard Hot 100	20
US Adult Pop Airplay (Billboard)	38
US Hot Dance/Electronic Songs (Billboard)	3
US Pop Airplay (Billboard)	11
US Rhythmic Airplay (Billboard)	36

Chart (2020)	Peak position
Hungary (Single Top 40)	36

Chart (2024)	Peak position
UK Dance (Official Charts)	23

=== Year-end charts ===
Chart (2016)	Position
Australia (ARIA)	4
Belgium (Ultratop Flanders)	30
Belgium (Ultratop Wallonia)	73
Canada (Canadian Hot 100)	51
France (SNEP)	72
New Zealand (Recorded Music NZ)	6
Switzerland (Schweizer Hitparade)	82
US Billboard Hot 100	60
US Hot Dance/Electronic Songs (Billboard)	8
US Mainstream Top 40 (Billboard)	40

Chart (2017)	Position
Australia (ARIA)	97
US Hot Dance/Electronic Songs (Billboard)	39

Chart (2024)	Position
Australia Dance (ARIA)	21

=== Decade-end charts ===
Chart (2010–2019)	Position
Australia (ARIA)	47
Australian Artist Singles (ARIA)	6

== Certifications ==
Region	Certification	Certified units/sales
Australia (ARIA)	7× Platinum	490,000^{‡}
Belgium (BRMA)	Platinum	20,000^{‡}
Canada (Music Canada)	2× Platinum	160,000^{‡}
Denmark (IFPI Danmark)	Gold	45,000^{‡}
France (SNEP) Martin Solveig remix	Diamond	333,333^{‡}
Germany (BVMI)	Gold	200,000^{‡}
Italy (FIMI)	Gold	25,000^{‡}
New Zealand (RMNZ)	8× Platinum	240,000^{‡}
United Kingdom (BPI)	Platinum	600,000^{‡}
United States (RIAA)	2× Platinum	2,000,000^{‡}
^{‡} Sales+streaming figures based on certification alone.

== See also ==
- List of best-selling singles in Australia
- List of number-one singles of 2016 (Australia)
