= Skin Companion EP 1 =

EP by Flume
- Released: 25 November 2016
- Genre: Electronic
- Length: 13:26
- Label: Mom + Pop; Future Classic
- Producer: Harley Streten

Flume chronology
Skin (2016)	Skin Companion EP 1 (2016)	Skin Companion EP 2 (2017)

Skin Companion EP 1 is an extended play (EP) by Australian electronic musician Flume. The four-track EP was written during the production of Flume's studio album, Skin.

It was released digitally and on vinyl, by Future Classic on 25 November 2016.

== Background ==
In August 2016, Flume announced the release of the EP. It follows the release of his second studio album, Skin and is "some more music that was written around the same time" as that album.

Flume said: "I've been overwhelmed by the support you guys have shown for Skin over the past few months and I wanted to share some more music that was written around the same time. The first Skin Companion EP is a 12" of songs we are releasing in November. It will be available on vinyl at lots of great indie record stores around the world."

== Critical reception ==
Professional ratings
Review scores
Source	Rating
Pitchfork	6.6/10

Nathan Reese of Pitchfork said that Skin Companion EP 1 is a "lithe, quirky, understated EP".

== Track listing ==
All tracks are written by Harley Streten.

Skin Companion EP 1 track listing
No.	Title	Length
1.	"Trust" (featuring Isabella Manfredi)	3:17
2.	"V"	2:29
3.	"Heater"	4:05
4.	"Quirk"	3:36
Total length:		13:26

== Charts ==
Chart (2016)	Peak position
Australia (ARIA)	29
US Top Dance Albums (Billboard)	3
