= Kai (Canadian singer) =

Canadian singer-songwriter

Alessia De Gasperis
- Also known as: Kai
- Born: Alessia Patrizia De Gasperis-Brigante; 17 March 1990 (age 36); Toronto, Ontario, Canada
- Genre: Pop
- Occupation: Singer-songwriter
- Instruments: Vocals; piano; keyboards; guitar
- Years active: 2008–present
- Label: Warner Music
- Website: alessiadegasperismusic.com

Alessia Patrizia De Gasperis-Brigante (born 17 March 1990), formerly known as Kai (also stylized in all lowercase), is a Canadian singer-songwriter from Toronto, Ontario. Best known for her collaborations, she co-wrote and was featured on Flume's Grammy-nominated "Never Be Like You", Diplo's "Revolution", and "Mind" from Jack Ü's Grammy award-winning 2015 album.

== Early life and education ==
Alessia De Gasperis-Brigante attended Bishop Strachan School.

Kai derives her name from the Japanese word kai, which means 'change'. She claims to be something new in music and she only wants "to relate [and] share her stories with her fans and anyone who will lend their ear."

On 2 April 2021, she said the following on social media: "Kai was part of me I felt safe in sharing. An aspect of me. But I'm ready to be all of me now. Change is good when it's coming from truth. Allow me to introduce myself: My name is Alessia De Gasperis and I look forward to our friendship and journey together and I'm grateful for your love and support always and forever, ADG (Alessia De Gasperis)."

== Career ==
=== Early career ===
In 2011, Kai released her debut extended play, 11:11, which included her debut single "I Choose Me", which is frequently used in campaigns for First Choice Haircutters. The EP received minimal promotion and did not chart.

In 2012, Kai collaborated with Montreal dubstep group Adventure Club on the track "Need Your Heart", which features Kai's vocals and writing. The song has been remixed by several artists, including Minnesota, Crywolf, and Candyland. The track peaked at number 2 on the iTunes Electronic music chart.

=== Breakthrough ===
Kai collaborated with Diplo on his EP Revolution, co-writing and appearing on the title track "Revolution". She lent her vocals to the track "Crawl" by Childish Gambino for his second studio album, Because the Internet.

In 2014, Kai wrote "Sweet Talker", which was produced by Diplo, the title track from Jessie J's third studio album of the same name which was released in October 2014. She stated that she wrote the song with Rihanna in mind. She wrote and was featured on the track "Mind" on the 2015 debut album of Jack Ü, a collaborative project of Skrillex and Diplo.

In 2016, Kai wrote and was featured on the track "Never Be Like You" by Australian electronic musician Flume. It reached number one in Australia and the top 20 in the United States, as well as becoming her first song to top the iTunes Electronic music chart.

== Discography ==
=== Albums ===
==== Extended plays ====
Title	Details
11:11	Released: 2011; Label: Watson Entertainment; Formats: Digital download, CD

=== Singles ===
==== As featured artist ====
List of singles released as featured artist
Title	Year	Peak chart positions							Certifications	Album
Title	Year	CAN	AUS	AUS Indie	BEL (FL)	FRA	NZ	US	Certifications	Album
"Need Your Heart" (Adventure Club featuring Kai)	2012	—	—	—	—	—	—	—		Non-album single
"Crawl" (Childish Gambino featuring Kai)	2013	—	—	—	—	—	—	86		Because the Internet
"Never Be Like You" (Flume featuring Kai)	2016	21	1	1	10	27	2	20	MC: 2× Platinum; ARIA: 7× Platinum; BEA: Platinum; RIAA: 2× Platinum; RMNZ: 8× Platinum; SNEP: Diamond (Note: Martin Solveig remix)	Skin
"—" denotes a recording that did not chart or was not released.

=== Other certified songs ===
List of other certified songs, showing release year and album
Title	Year	Certifications	Album
"Revolution" (Diplo featuring Faustix, ImanoS and Kai)	2013	RIAA: Gold; RMNZ: Gold	Revolution
"Mind" (Jack Ü featuring Kai)	2015	RIAA: Gold; RMNZ: Gold	Skrillex and Diplo Present Jack Ü

Other featured in

- 2015: "Let Me Love You Right" (Hunter Siegel feat. Kai)

== Awards and nominations ==
Year	Ceremony	Category	Nominated work	Result
2011	Independent Music Awards	Best Folk Singer-Songwriter Song	"I Choose Me"	Nominated
2012	Toronto Independent Music Awards	HNSS – Best Acoustic Performance	N/A	Won
2016	ARIA Awards	Best Pop Release	"Never Be like You"	Won
2016	ARIA Awards	Song of the Year	"Never Be like You"	Nominated
2016	ARIA Awards	Best Video	"Never Be like You"	Nominated
2017	Grammy Awards	Best Dance Recording	"Never Be like You"	Nominated
2017	APRA Awards	Dance Work of the Year	"Never Be Like You" (Harley Streten, Kai, Geoffrey Earley) – Flume featuring Kai	Won
2017	APRA Awards	Most Played Australian Work	"Never Be Like You" (Harley Streten, Kai, Geoffrey Earley) – Flume featuring Kai	Won
