= Skin (Flume album) =

Studio album by Flume
- Released: 27 May 2016
- Genres: Future bass; electropop; dance-pop; hip hop; EDM
- Length: 60:34
- Labels: Future Classic; Mom + Pop; Transgressive
- Producer: Harley Streten

Flume chronology
Lockjaw EP (2013)	Skin (2016)	Skin Companion EP 1 (2016)

Singles from Skin
- 1. "Never Be Like You" Released: 15 January 2016; 2. "Smoke & Retribution" Released: 28 January 2016; 3. "Say It" Released: 20 April 2016

Skin is the second studio album by Australian electronic musician Flume. It was released on 27 May 2016 by Future Classic. The album was Flume's second full-length release following his self-titled debut in 2012. It features guest appearances from Kai, Vic Mensa, Kučka, Tove Lo, Vince Staples, Allan Kingdom, Raekwon, Little Dragon, AlunaGeorge, MNDR, and Beck.

Skin received generally positive reviews and debuted at number one on the Australian Albums Chart, also peaking at number eight on the US Billboard 200. The album was named Album of the Year at the 2016 ARIA Music Awards. It also won the Best Dance/Electronic Album at the 2017 Grammy Awards. At the J Awards, the album was nominated for Australian Album of the Year.

== Release and promotion ==
Skin premiered via a Facebook live stream on 26 May 2016, which also included video segments of Phil Taggart interviewing Flume at the album listening party in London. "Never Be Like You" featuring Canadian singer Kai, was released as the album's lead single on 15 January 2016. "Smoke & Retribution" featuring American rapper Vince Staples and Australian singer Kučka, was released as the album's second single on 28 January 2016. "Say It" featuring Swedish singer Tove Lo, was released as the album's third single on 20 April 2016.

== Critical reception ==
Professional ratings
Aggregate scores
Source	Rating
AnyDecentMusic?	6.8/10
Metacritic	75/100
Review scores
Source	Rating
AllMusic	4/5 stars
Consequence	B
Evening Standard	4/5 stars
The Independent	5/5 stars
The Irish Times	3/5 stars
The Observer	3/5 stars
Pitchfork	6.4/10
Rolling Stone	3.5/5 stars
Slant Magazine	3.5/5 stars
The Sydney Morning Herald	4/5 stars

Skin was met with generally positive reviews. At Metacritic, which assigns a normalised rating out of 100 to reviews from professional publications, the album received an average score of 75, based on 11 reviews. Aggregator AnyDecentMusic? gave it 6.8 out of 10, based on their assessment of the critical consensus.

Heather Phares of AllMusic said, "While it could have benefitted from some editing, Skin still shows a lot of growth--it's more mature, and more memorable, than Flume". Kahron Spearman of The Austin Chronicle said, "Skin goes Technicolor and bigger, effectively standing on the shoulders of Disclosure and giant stars including Skrillex, Diplo, and album collaborator/reinventor Beck". Derek Staples of Consequence said, "Gearing up to be the next EDM crossover talent, Flume's sophomore effort, Skin, showcases a producer at ease with all of the sounds moving tickets at America's major festival events: hip-hop, indie pop, and EDM". The Independent's Justin Carissimo gave the album a very positive review, stating that the album was "the audio equivalent of ecstasy". David Smith of the Evening Standard gave a similarly positive review, stating that "this is music that can do much more than get feet moving". Luke Fowler of Pretty Much Amazing said, "Skin is the sound of Flume reaching for great heights and almost grasping what he seeks there".

Stacey Anderson of Pitchfork said, "["Wall Fuck" is] short and snappy, gone too fast in an album that could've been streamlined to let moments like it shine. But maybe it's the sound of floodgates opening". Keith Harris of Rolling Stone said, "Restless versatility is all over the LP, generating the emotional crests and sensory overload a festival crowd demands, but with a nuance that'll make it work even if you aren't shirtless in the desert". Jonathan Wroble of Slant Magazine said, "If the burden on electronic producers is to establish personality beyond a dense network of light displays and computer processing, this album gets Flume halfway there: It shows him as unquestionably human (overeager, alternately flashy and timid, sometimes more in awe than in control), but still a bit faceless". The Sydney Morning Herald's Craig Mathieson gave the album a positive review, stating that "the record is intoxicating and eclectic". Jim Carroll of The Irish Times felt that several tracks seemed to emphasize "showing off textures rather than providing the breathing room for an actual song to emerge". Ben Thompson of The Observer said, "Distinguished guests—UK nearly siren AlunaGeorge, rapper Vince Staples--are ushered respectfully through a series of viable electronic hinterlands, where a couple of them, notably perennial cameo supplier Little Dragon and Wu Tang vet Raekwon, manage to put down roots in actual songs".

=== Industry awards ===
Awards and nominations for Skin
Year	Ceremony	Category	Result	Ref.
2016	ARIA Music Awards	Album of the Year	Won	
2016	J Awards	Australian Album of the Year	Nominated	
2017	AIR Awards	Best Independent Dance/Electronica Album	Nominated	
2017	Grammy Awards	Best Dance/Electronic Album	Won	

== Track listing ==
All tracks produced by Flume.

Skin track listing
No.	Title	Writer(s)	Length
1.	"Helix"	Harley Streten	3:30
2.	"Never Be Like You" (featuring Kai)	Streten; Alessia De Gasperis-Brigante; Geoffrey Earley	3:54
3.	"Lose It" (featuring Vic Mensa)	Streten; Victor Mensah	3:45
4.	"Numb & Getting Colder" (featuring Kučka)	Streten; Laura Jane Lowther; Earley	5:08
5.	"Say It" (featuring Tove Lo)	Streten; Ebba Nilsson; Daniel Johns	4:23
6.	"Wall Fuck"	Streten	3:09
7.	"Pika"	Streten; Will Johnson	1:55
8.	"Smoke & Retribution" (featuring Vince Staples and Kučka)	Streten; Vince Staples; Lowther	4:01
9.	"3"	Streten	3:04
10.	"When Everything Was New"	Streten	2:27
11.	"You Know" (featuring Allan Kingdom and Raekwon)	Streten; Allan Kyariga; Corey Woods	3:22
12.	"Take a Chance" (featuring Little Dragon)	Streten; Yukimi Nagano; Erik Bodin; Fredrik Wallin; Håkan Wirenstrand	5:28
13.	"Innocence" (featuring AlunaGeorge)	Streten; Aluna Francis	6:18
14.	"Like Water" (featuring MNDR)	Streten; Amanda Warner; Peter Wade Keusch	3:13
15.	"Free"	Streten	2:56
16.	"Tiny Cities" (featuring Beck)	Streten; Beck Hansen	3:56
Total length:			60:34

Notes

- "Say It" features additional vocals by Daniel Johns
- "Pika" features vocals by Wills

== Charts ==
=== Weekly charts ===
Chart performance for Skin
Chart (2016)	Peak position
Australian Albums (ARIA)	1
Austrian Albums (Ö3 Austria)	25
Belgian Albums (Ultratop Flanders)	3
Belgian Albums (Ultratop Wallonia)	13
Canadian Albums (Billboard)	8
Dutch Albums (Album Top 100)	17
French Albums (SNEP)	48
German Albums (Offizielle Top 100)	43
Irish Albums (IRMA)	28
New Zealand Albums (RMNZ)	1
Norwegian Albums (VG-lista)	26
Scottish Albums (Official Charts)	58
Swiss Albums (Schweizer Hitparade)	20
UK Albums (Official Charts)	25
US Billboard 200	8
US Top Dance Albums (Billboard)	1

=== Year-end charts ===
2016 year-end chart performance for Skin
Chart (2016)	Position
Australian Albums (ARIA)	16
Australian Dance Albums (ARIA)	1
Belgian Albums (Ultratop Flanders)	111
Belgian Albums (Ultratop Wallonia)	189
New Zealand Albums (RMNZ)	49
US Billboard 200	118
US Top Dance/Electronic Albums (Billboard)	4

2017 year-end chart performance for Skin
Chart (2017)	Position
Australian Albums (ARIA)	89
US Top Dance/Electronic Albums (Billboard)	6

2018 year-end chart performance for Skin
Chart (2018)	Position
US Top Dance/Electronic Albums (Billboard)	21

== Certifications ==
Certifications for Skin
Region	Certification	Certified units/sales
Australia (ARIA)	Platinum	70,000^{‡}
United States (RIAA)	Gold	500,000^{‡}
^{‡} Sales+streaming figures based on certification alone.

== See also ==
- List of number-one albums of 2016 (Australia)

Awards and achievements
Preceded by Skrillex and Diplo Present Jack Ü	Grammy Award for Best Dance/Electronic Album; 2017	Incumbent
