= Flume (musician) =

Australian electronic musician (born 1991)

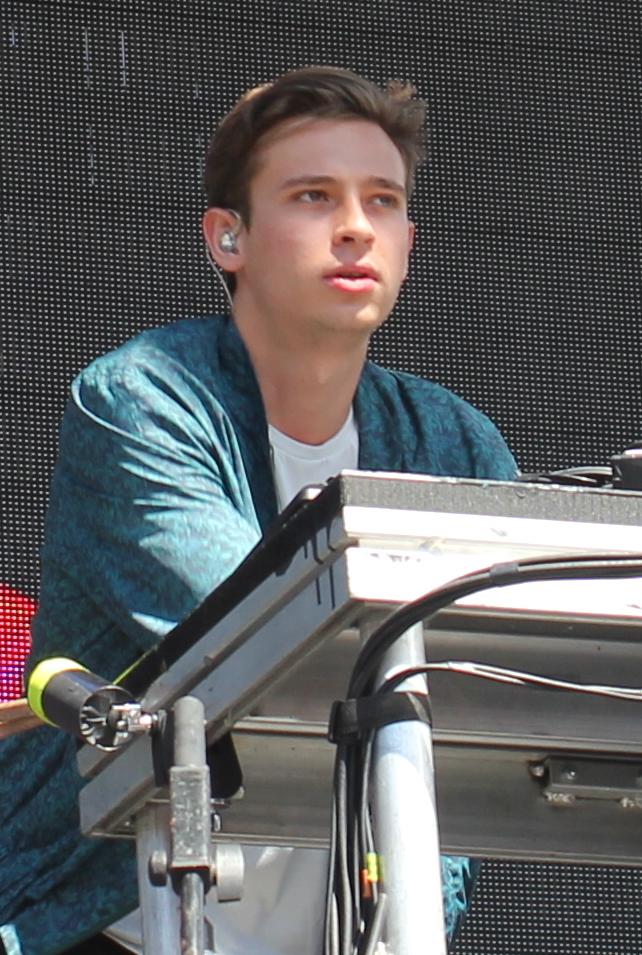
- Flume performing in 2014

Background information
- Born: Harley Edward Streten; 5 November 1991 (age 35); Sydney, New South Wales, Australia
- Genres: Electronic; future bass; experimental; hyperpop; trap; hip hop; pop; electropop
- Occupations: DJ; music producer
- Instruments: Saxophone, synthesizers
- Years active: 2010–present
- Labels: Future Classic; Transgressive; Mom + Pop
- Formerly of: What So Not
- Website: flumemusic.com

Harley Edward Streten (born 5 November 1991), known professionally as Flume, is an Australian musician, DJ, and record producer. He is regarded as a pioneer of future bass who helped popularise the genre. His self-titled debut studio album, Flume, was released in 2012 to positive reviews, topping the ARIA Albums Chart and reaching double-platinum accreditation in Australia.

Flume has remixed songs from such artists as Lorde, Sam Smith, Arcade Fire, Hermitude and Disclosure. His second studio album, Skin, was released in 2016, again topping the ARIA Albums Chart. The album won the Best Dance/Electronic Album at the 2017 Grammy Awards. The album gained international recognition for its lead single, "Never Be Like You", which was nominated for Best Dance Recording. After the release of Skin, Flume released Skin Companion EP 1 in November 2016 and Skin Companion EP 2 in February 2017 as the album's B-side EPs. In 2019, he released a mixtape, Hi This Is Flume, to positive reviews. His third studio album, Palaces, was released in May 2022. In February 2023, he released his second mixtape, Things Don't Always Go the Way You Plan. His third mixtape, titled Arrived Anxious, Left Bored was released in May 2023.

== Career ==
=== Early life ===
Harley Edward Streten was born on 5 November 1991 in Sydney. His father, Glen Streten, is a filmmaker and record producer, and his mother, Lyndall, is a horticulturist and former teacher. He grew up on the Northern Beaches of Sydney with a younger sister and brother, and attended Seaforth Public School for primary school and St Augustine's College, Brookvale and Mosman High School for secondary school. At the age of 11, he began composing music with a basic CD mixing and DJ program he found packaged in a box of Kelloggs' Nutrigrain. The disk showed how music was layered and gave Flume a new perspective that jump-started his music production. In 2010, Flume began producing house music under his initials, HEDS. He created two tracks, "Flow" and "Fizz", in addition to several remixes.

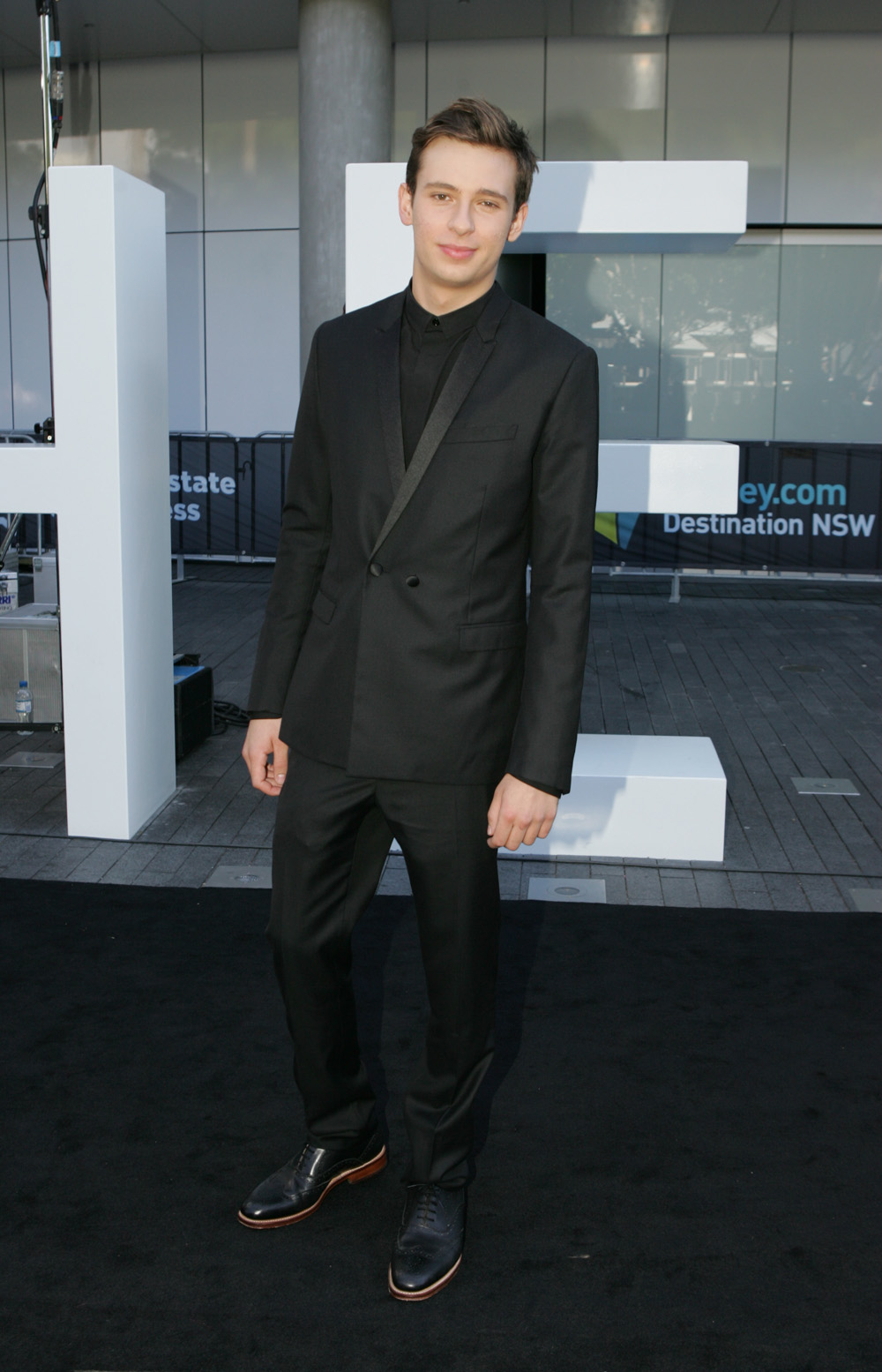
Flume at ARIA Awards 2013

=== 2011–2014: Sleepless and Flume ===
Flume had his first radio play with the song "Possum", which had been uploaded to Triple J Unearthed, and was signed in 2011 through an original artists competition managed by the Australian record company Future Classic. He submitted the tracks "Sleepless", "Over You" and "Paper Thin" to finish second in the competition. Nathan McLay, founder of Future Classic and now Flume's manager, assisted with the release of his first EP, titled Sleepless, which contained the three original tracks. He opted for the moniker "Flume" after the Bon Iver song of the same name.

Flume's self-titled debut album was released on 9 November 2012. The album has 15 songs and is 49 minutes long. It was done on his first laptop that he had ever purchased. He finished the album on this laptop while he was on a low-budget trip to London. The album's production saw Flume collaborating with vocal artists Moon Holiday, Jezzabell Doran, Chet Faker, and New York rapper T-shirt. It debuted on the ARIA Albums Chart at number two, behind One Direction's Take Me Home. In December 2012, Flume signed with Mom + Pop Music and announced the North American release of his self-titled debut studio album. The album was released in the US on 21 February 2013 and received strong support from American critics, averaging a score of 73 out of 100 on review aggregate site Metacritic.

On Australia Day 2013, four of Flume's songs (including a remix) were listed on Triple J Hottest 100 for 2012. His album's breakthrough song "Holdin On" was listed at number four, the highest-charting Australian song. Other inclusions were "Sleepless" and his remix of "Hyperparadise" by Hermitude, both in the top 20 (numbers 12 and 18, respectively), and "On Top" at number 67. Flume's voted songs placed higher on the ARIA Singles Chart. "Holdin On" returned to the top 50 chart in the spot of number 17, its highest-ever placement. His "Hyperparadise" remix also debuted in the top 50 at number 38. "Sleepless" and "On Top" debuted at numbers 53 and 75, respectively. Flume's debut studio album reached number one on the ARIA Albums Chart.

In February 2013, Flume announced his first national headlining Australian tour, entitled the "Infinity Prism Tour". It occurred during April and May 2013, and according to a later interview, the tour sold 40,000 tickets. In March 2013, Flume was named one of Fuse TV's 30 "Must-See Acts" at the SXSW festival. Flume spent the beginning of 2014 touring internationally, including stops at Lollapalooza in South America and Coachella where he debuted his remix of Lorde's "Tennis Court". In 2015, Flume released his first original track since his debut studio album, "Some Minds", featuring vocals from Miike Snow's Andrew Wyatt.

==== Side projects ====
With Sydney DJ and record producer Emoh Instead, Flume formed the duo What So Not in 2011. On 21 February 2015, Streten announced that he had left the project, saying: "Emoh and I have been moving in different directions creatively, we haven't made any music together in quite a while. Our final joint project is a soon-to-be-released EP that we completed last year. That will be the last What So Not project I'll be creatively involved with."

=== 2016–2018: Skin ===
In early January 2016, Flume released a four-and-a-half-minute preview of his second studio album, Skin. The following month, the lead single, "Never Be Like You", featuring vocals from Canadian singer Kai, reached number one in Australia, making it Flume's first chart-topping song. In April, Flume released his second official single, "Say It", featuring the Swedish singer and songwriter Tove Lo. Later in May 2016, the track list for the album was unveiled, revealing that Vic Mensa, Allan Kingdom, Raekwon, Little Dragon, AlunaGeorge, MNDR and Beck were among the other collaborators to be featured on Skin. On 27 May 2016, Flume released his second studio album, Skin. The album is one hour long and has 16 songs. The album received positive reviews from critics, with an aggregate score of 75 out of 100 from Metacritic. At the ARIA Music Awards of 2016, Flume won eight awards, including Album of the Year and Best Male Artist. The album won the Best Dance/Electronic Album at the 2017 Grammy Awards. The album gained international recognition from the album's first single, "Never Be like You", which was nominated for Best Dance Recording.

Flume has released two B-side EPs for Skin, titled Skin Companion EP 1 and Skin Companion EP 2, in November 2016 and February 2017 respectively. On 26 January 2017, it was announced that his single "Never Be Like You" was Triple J's Hottest 100 of 2016, taking the number one spot. It received a total of 2.2 million votes, the most votes in a Triple J's Hottest 100 so far. Flume also became the first electronic producer to top the list. Also featured in the list were his songs "Say It", coming in at number eight, "Smoke & Retribution", coming in at number 37 and "Lose It" at number 95. On 5 May 2017, Flume released a bonus single of his Skin Companion EP 2 titled "Hyperreal".

Flume contributed productions for Lorde and Vince Staples' albums Melodrama and Big Fish Theory respectively. Melodrama was released on 16 June 2017 while Staples' Big Fish Theory was released the following week on 23 June 2017. Flume helped Lorde produce the track "The Louvre" on the New Zealander's second album. On 28 November 2017, Flume was a presenter at the ARIA Music Awards of 2017.

=== 2019–2022: Hi This Is Flume and Palaces ===
On 19 March 2019, Flume announced the release of new music on his Twitter page. His mixtape premiered on YouTube only a day after via a livestream. Hi This Is Flume consists of 17 songs, featuring collaborations with Kučka, Eprom, JPEGMafia, Sophie, HWLS and Slowthai. It was his first solo project since the release of Skin Companion EP 2 in 2017. The mixtape is 38 minutes long and is accompanied by a visualiser from Australian artist Jonathan Zawada. The experimental mixtape was released to generally positive reviews from critics, debuted at number 9 on the Dance/Electronic Albums chart and peaked at number 185 on the Billboard 200. The mixtape was nominated at the 62 Annual Grammy Awards for the Best Dance/Electronic Album, becoming Flume's second nomination in the category. On 11 March 2020 Flume released a new single called "The Difference" featuring Toro y Moi. On 3 July 2020, Flume released a remix of Eiffel 65's "Blue (Da Ba Dee)". Flume's third studio album, Palaces, was released on 20 May 2022. In November 2022, Flume released a previously unreleased demo track titled Slugger 1.4 [2014 Export.WAV] for the tenth anniversary of the release of his 2012 self-titled debut studio album.

=== 2023–2024: Things Don't Always Go the Way You Plan and Arrived Anxious, Left Bored ===
On 8 February 2023, Flume released his second mixtape album, titled Things Don't Always Go the Way You Plan. It is 34 minutes long and consists of ten previously unreleased songs dating from 2012 to 2021, and features collaborations with Injury Reserve, Isabella Manfredi and Panda Bear.

In April of the same year, Flume announced that a second compilation of unreleased material was to be released in the coming weeks. On 3 May 2023, Flume released his third mixtape album, titled Arrived Anxious, Left Bored. It is 37 minutes long and consists of another ten previously unreleased songs, dating from 2015 to 2021, and features collaborations with Jim-E Stack and Emile Haynie.

=== 2025 – present: We Live In A Society and Dumb ===
On his Instagram story on 23 April 2025, Flume posted a link to weliveinasociety.info, which contained a sign-up for a mailing list. On 25 April 2025, Flume and JPEGMAFIA released "Track 1". On 30 April 2025, Flume announced that We Live In A Society, a collaborative EP with JPEGMAFIA, would release on 2 May 2025. This EP consists of four songs, including a feature by Ravyn Lenae.

Following the promotion style of We Live In A Society, Flume posted a link to dumb.store on an Instagram story on 15 July 2025, which included a mailing list sign-up and a countdown to 18 July 2025. On 17 July 2025, Flume announced Dumb, a 10-track-long collaborative album with Emma Louise scheduled to be released on 22 August 2025. The first single from the collaborative album, "Easy Goodbye", was released on 18 July 2025. The second single, "Shine, Glow, Glisten", was released on 1 August 2025. The third single, "Monsoon", was released on 21 August 2025.

== Personal life ==
A viral Instagram video shared by Streten's then-girlfriend actress Paige Elkington on 2 September 2019 with the caption "Sorry mom" showed Streten performing anilingus on her during a performance at Burning Man in Black Rock City, Nevada. Although quickly removed from the platform, the post was circulated widely on social media and shared by a range of news outlets. Despite the many reactions from the video and how it was negatively portrayed in tabloids, the publicity had a positive influence on his career. In an interview about the incident, he stated: "I got the opposite of being cancelled."

As of May 2019, Flume was living in Los Angeles, California, but returned to Australia in some capacity a year later. In April 2025, Flume announced his engagement to Isabella Lalonde, an American fashion designer.

== Discography ==
Studio albums

- Flume (2012)
- Skin (2016)
- Palaces (2022)

Collaborative studio albums

- Dumb (2025) (with Emma Louise)

== Awards and nominations ==
=== AIR Awards ===
The Australian Independent Record Awards (commonly known informally as AIR Awards) is an annual awards night to recognise, promote and celebrate the success of Australia's Independent Music sector.

Year	Nominee / work	Award	Result	Ref.
2012	"Sleepless"	Best Independent Dance/Electronic Club Song or EP	Nominated	
2013	Flume	Best Independent Artist	Won	
2013	Flume	Best Independent Album	Won	
2013	Flume	Best Independent Dance/Electronica Album	Won	
2013	"Holdin On"	Best Independent Single/EP	Nominated	
2013	"Holdin On"	Best Independent Dance/Electronica Single	Won	
2017	Himself	Best Independent Artist	Nominated	
2017	"Never Be Like You" (featuring Kai)	Best Independent Dance/Electronic or Club Song or EP	Nominated	
2017	Skin	Best Independent Dance/Electronic Album	Nominated	
2020	Hi This is Flume	Best Independent Dance or Electronica Album or EP	Nominated	
2020	"Rushing Back" (with Vera Blue)	Best Independent Dance, Electronica or Club Single	Nominated	
2021	"The Difference" (with Toro y Moi)	Best Independent Dance, Electronica or Club Single	Nominated	
2023	Palaces	Best Independent Dance or Electronica Album or EP	Nominated	
2023	"Say Nothing" (with May-A)	Best Independent Dance, Electronica or Club Single	Nominated	
2023	Future Classic: Flume – Palaces	Independent Marketing Team of the Year	Nominated	

=== APRA Music Awards ===
The APRA Music Awards are annual awards to celebrate excellence in contemporary music, which honour the skills of member composers, songwriters, and publishers who have achieved outstanding success in sales and airplay performance. They commenced in 1982.

Year	Nominee / work	Award	Result	Ref.
2013	"Holdin On" (Flume and O. Redding)	Song of the Year	Shortlisted	
2014	"Holdin On"	Dance Work of the Year	Won	
2014	"Drop the Game" (with Chet Faker)	Song of the Year	Shortlisted	
2017	"Never Be like You" (Harley Streten, Kai, Geoffrey Earley) – Flume featuring Kai	Dance Work of the Year	Won	
2017	"Say It" (Streten, Julian Hamilton, Daniel Johns, Tove Lo) – Flume featuring Tove Lo	Dance Work of the Year	Nominated	
2017	"Never Be like You" (Streten, Kai, Earley) – Flume featuring Kai	Most Played Australian Work	Won	
2017	"Say It" (Streten, Hamilton, Johns, Lo) – Flume featuring Tove Lo	Most Played Australian Work	Nominated	
2017	Flume	Songwriter of the Year	Won	
2020	"Rushing Back" - Flume featuring Vera Blue (Streten, Celia Pavey, Sophie Cates, Eric Dubowsky)	Song of the Year	Shortlisted	
2021	"Rushing Back" (Streten, Celia Pavey, Eric Dubowsky, Sophie Cates) (featuring Vera Blue)	Most Performed Australian Work	Nominated	
2021	"Rushing Back" (Streten, Celia Pavey, Eric Dubowsky, Sophie Cates) (featuring Vera Blue)	Most Performed Dance Work	Won	
2023	"Say Nothing" (Streten, Sarah Aarons) (featuring MAY-A)	Song of the Year	Won	
2023	"Say Nothing" (Streten, Sarah Aarons) (featuring MAY-A)	Most Performed Dance / Electronic Work	Nominated	

=== ARIA Music Awards ===
The ARIA Music Awards is an annual awards ceremony that recognises excellence, innovation, and achievement across all genres of Australian music. They commenced in 1987.

Year	Nominee / work	Award	Result	Ref.
2013	Flume	Album of the Year	Nominated	
2013	Flume	Breakthrough Artist – Release	Won	
2013	Flume	Best Male Artist	Won	
2013	Flume	Best Dance Release	Won	
2013	Flume	Producer of the Year	Won	
2013	The Infinity Prism Tour	Best Australian Live Act	Nominated	
2013	"Holdin On" – Joe Nappa	Best Video	Nominated	
2013	"Holdin On"	Song of the Year	Nominated	
2014	"Drop the Game" (with Chet Faker)	Best Dance Release	Nominated	
2015	"Some Minds" featuring Andrew Wyatt – Clemens Habicht	Best Video	Nominated	
2016	Skin	Album of the Year	Won	
2016	Skin	Best Male Artist	Won	
2016	Skin	Best Dance Release	Won	
2016	Skin	Best Independent Release	Won	
2016	"Never Be like You" (featuring Kai)	Best Pop Release	Won	
2016	"Never Be like You" (featuring Kai)	Song of the Year	Nominated	
2016	"Never Be Like You" featuring Kai – Clemens Habicht	Best Video	Nominated	
2016	St.Jerome's Laneway Festival 2016	Best Australian Live Act	Nominated	
2016	Skin	Producer of the Year	Won	
2016	Eric J Dubowsky and Flume for Skin	Engineer of the Year	Won	
2016	Jonathan Zawada for Flume – Skin	Best Cover Art	Won	
2017	Flume: Australian Tour 2016	Best Australian Live Act	Nominated	
2019	Jonathan Zawada for Hi This is Flume	Best Cover Art	Nominated	
2020	"Rushing Back" (featuring Vera Blue)	Best Dance Release	Nominated	
2020	"Rushing Back" (featuring Vera Blue)	Song of the Year	Nominated	
2022	Palaces	Best Solo Artist	Nominated	
2022	Palaces	Best Dance/Electronic Release	Nominated	
2022	"Say Nothing" (featuring May-A)	Best Pop Release	Nominated	
2022	"Say Nothing" (featuring May-A)	Best Video	Nominated	
2022	"Say Nothing" (featuring May-A)	Song of the Year	Nominated	
2022	Jonathan Zawada for Flume – Palaces	Best Cover Art	Nominated	
2023	"Silent Assassin" (with Tkay Maidza)	Best Hip Hop/Rap Release	Nominated	
2025	Eric J Dubowsky for Emma Louise and Flume – Dumb	Best Engineered Release	Nominated	

=== Billboard Music Awards ===
Year	Nominee / work	Award	Result	Ref.
2017	Skin	Top Dance/Electronic Album	Nominated	

=== Electronic Music Awards ===
Year	Nominee / work	Award	Result	Ref.
2017	Flume	Live Act of the Year	Nominated	

=== Environmental Music Prize ===
The Environmental Music Prize is a quest to find a theme song to inspire action on climate and conservation. It commenced in 2022.

Year	Nominee / work	Award	Result	Ref.
2023	"Go"	Environmental Music Prize	Nominated	

=== Grammy Awards ===
Year	Nominee / work	Award	Result	Ref.
2017	"Never Be Like You"	Best Dance Recording	Nominated	
2017	Skin	Best Dance/Electronic Album	Won	
2020	Hi This Is Flume	Best Dance/Electronic Album	Nominated	
2021	"The Difference"	Best Dance Recording	Nominated	

=== Helpmann Awards ===
The Helpmann Awards is an awards show, celebrating live entertainment and performing arts in Australia, presented by industry group Live Performance Australia since 2001. Note: 2020 and 2021 were cancelled due to the COVID-19 pandemic.

Year	Nominee / work	Award	Result	Ref.
2014	Flume - Infinity Prism Tour	Best Australian Contemporary Concert	Nominated	
2017	Flume - Flume	Best Australian Contemporary Concert	Nominated	

=== iHeartRadio Music Awards ===
Year	Category	Nominated work	Result	Ref.
2017	Dance Artist of the Year	Flume	Nominated	

=== J Awards ===
The J Awards are an annual series of Australian music awards that were established by the Australian Broadcasting Corporation's youth-focused radio station Triple J. They commenced in 2005.

Year	Nominee / work	Award	Result	Ref.
2012	Flume	Unearthed Artist of the Year	Nominated	
2013	Flume	Australian Album of the Year	Won	
2015	"Some Minds" by Flume featuring Andrew Wyatt (directed by Clemens Habicht)	Australian Video of the Year	Nominated	
2016	Skin	Australian Album of the Year	Nominated	
2019	"Hi, This is Flume" by Flume (directed by Jonathan Zawada)	Australian Video of the Year	Nominated	
2022	"Say Nothing" by Flume featuring Maya (directed by Michael Hili)	Australian Video of the Year	Nominated	
2022	Palaces	Australian Album of the Year	Nominated	

=== MTV Europe Music Awards ===
The MTV Europe Music Awards is an award presented by Viacom International Media Networks to honour artists and music in pop culture. They commenced in 2013.

Year	Nominee / work	Award	Result	Ref.
2013	Flume	Best Australian Act	Nominated	
2016	Flume	Best Australian Act	Nominated	

=== National Live Music Awards ===
The National Live Music Awards (NLMAs) are a broad recognition of Australia's diverse live industry, celebrating the success of the Australian live scene. The awards commenced in 2016.

Year	Nominee / work	Award	Result	Ref.
2016	Flume	Live Electronic Act (or DJ) of the Year	Won	
2017	Flume	International Live Achievement (Solo)	Nominated	

=== NRJ Music Awards ===
Year	Nominee / work	Award	Result	Ref.
2016	Flume	Best New DJ	Nominated	
