= Future Classic =

Australian music company

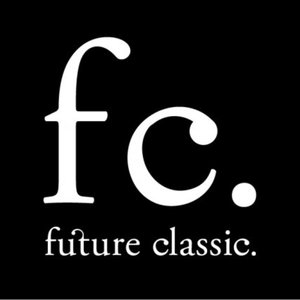
- Founded: 2004; 22 years ago
- Founder: Nathan McLay
- Distributors: BBTV/VISO Music, PIAS/Virgin Music Group
- Genre: Alternative rock; electronic
- Country of origin: Australia
- Location: Sydney, New South Wales, Australia
- Official website: www.futureclassic.com

Future Classic is an Australian independent record label, artist management team, touring agency, and music publisher.

== Background ==
Future Classic was founded in 2004 by Nathan McLay.

McLay was appointed to the board of Music Australia, which is part of Creative Australia, the rebranded Australia Council of the Arts, created in August 2023.

Future Classic is an independent record label.

== Artists ==
Artists signed to the label include:

- (Australia) Basenji
- (United States) Blaketheman1000
- (United States) Buzzy Lee
- (Australia) Christopher Port
- (United States) Classixx
- (Canada) Ebhoni
- (Colombia) Ela Minus
- (United States) Eric J
- (Australia) Flight Facilities
- (Australia) Flume
- (Australia) G Flip
- (Australia) Hayden James
- (Australia) Jagwar Ma
- (South Africa) Jonti
- (Australia) Panama
- (United States) Machine Girl
- (Australia) Seekae
- (Australia) Sycco
- (Australia) Ta-ku
- (Australia) Thrupence
- (Australia) Touch Sensitive
- (Australia) Wafia

Touring artists include:

- Anthony Naples
- Basenji
- Bicep
- Cashmere Cat
- Charles Murdoch
- Chrome Sparks
- Classixx
- Com Truise
- Cyril Hahn
- Dixon
- DJ Koze
- Flight Facilities
- Flume
- G Flip
- Harvey Sutherland
- HNNY
- Henrik Schwarz
- HWLS
- Jacques Renault
- Joakim
- John Talabot
- Kaytranada
- Kenji Takimi
- Kenton Slash Demon
- Koreless
- Lindstrøm
- Leon Vynehall
- Little Dragon
- Lxury
- Medlar
- MGNA Crrrta
- Move D
- Michael Mayer
- Mount Kimbie
- Oneman
- Prins Thomas
- Roland Tings
- Rustie
- Ryan Hemsworth
- Sébastien Tellier
- Shlohmo
- Sophie
- Ta-ku
- Tensnake
- The Magician
- The Whitest Boy Alive
- Tiger & Woods
- Todd Terje
- Tornado Wallace
- Toro y Moi

== See also ==
- Lists of record labels
