= Tamara Jaber =

Australian singer

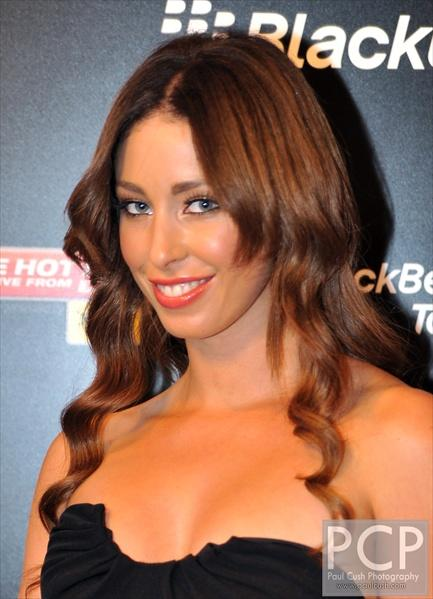
- Jaber in 2011

Background information
- Born: 13 August 1982 (age 44); Paddington, New South Wales
- Genres: Pop; dance
- Occupations: Singer; songwriter; dancer
- Instrument: Vocals
- Years active: 2001–present
- Labels: King Kyle; Young and Vicious Records
- Formerly of: Scandal'us; Scarlett Belle
- Website: www.tamarajaber.com

Tamara Jaber (Arabic: تمارا جابر; born 13 August 1982) is an Australian recording artist who rose to fame in the early 2000s as a winner on the hit TV show Popstars. She was a member of the pop group Scandal'us. Following the disbandment of Scandal'us in 2002, Jaber signed to record label King Kyle Records and released two solo singles "Ooh Ahh" and "Hard for Me". In 2007, she became a member of the pop duo Scarlett Belle, before resuming her solo career in 2011. Jaber released her debut extended play Felt, Not Heard through US independent label in November 2012.

== Early life ==
Tamara Jaber was born in Paddington, New South Wales on 13 August 1982. Jaber's mother is of New Zealand origin and her father is Lebanese. She began singing and dancing at the age of three. At the age of eight, Jaber had begun formal tap, jazz and ballet lessons. She later auditioned for the Newtown High School of the Performing Arts and was accepted, studying dance and drama. At the age of fourteen, Jaber represented Australia in the America Song and Dance Championships and won first prize. She also won a scholarship to the Australian Institute of Music for years 11 and 12, completing a Diploma of Music, at the same time also completing her HSC.

== Career ==
=== 2001–2005: Scandal'us and solo career ===
Jaber began her music career as a member of the pop group Scandal'us, which also consisted of Anna Belperio, Jason Bird, Simon Ditcham and Daniela Scala. The group became the winners of the second season of Popstars Australia in 2001 and received a record deal with Festival Mushroom Records as a result. Their debut single "Me, Myself & I" debuted at number one on the ARIA Singles Chart, where it remained for three consecutive weeks. The song was certified double platinum by the Australian Recording Industry Association for selling over 140,000 copies. It also won the award for Highest Selling Single at the 2001 ARIA Music Awards. Scandal'us' debut album, Startin' Somethin', debuted at number two on the ARIA Albums Chart. The group's second and final single "Make Me Crazy" peaked at number 30 on the ARIA Singles Chart. Scandal'us later disbanded in 2002.

After the disbandment of Scandal'us, Jaber signed to her then-boyfriend and radio DJ Kyle Sandilands' record label, King Kyle Records. In 2004, she was featured on singer Kacey Baker's single "Ice Ice Baby". The following year, Jaber released her debut solo single "Ooh Ahh", which peaked at number 13 on the ARIA Singles Chart. Sandilands was criticised in a Today Tonight segment for dishonestly promoting the single on Today Network radio stations, including 2Day FM. "Hard for Me" was released as Jaber's second single and peaked at number 23 on the ARIA Singles Chart.

=== 2007–2011: Scarlett Belle ===
In 2007, Jaber became a member of the Australian girl group Scarlett Belle with Reigan Derry and Hayley Aitken. The group signed a record deal with US label Def Jam Recordings later that year. Based between Los Angeles and Sydney, Scarlett Belle began to work on their debut album with Ne-Yo, Snoop Dogg, JR Rotem, Nate Dogg and StarGate, as well as Australian producers Rudy Sandapa and Israel Cruz. However, in 2008, Scarlett Belle were dropped from Def Jam Recordings and Aitken left the group, leaving Jaber and Derry as a duo.

They later signed with Sony Music Australia and released their debut single "Closure" in June 2010, which peaked at number 38 on the ARIA Singles Chart. Scarlett Belle released their second single in August 2010, a cover of Cruz's 2009 song "Freak Tonight". Featuring guest vocal appearances from Cruz and rapper Miracle, the song peaked at number 29 on the ARIA Singles Chart. Their third and final single "Lover Boy" was released in November 2010, but failed to impact the charts. In May 2011, Jaber announced in an interview with Australia's OK! magazine that Scarlett Belle had disbanded and that she would be pursuing a solo career in the United States and the Middle East.

=== 2012–present: Return to solo career ===
Following the disbandment of Scarlett Belle, Jaber moved to Los Angeles to focus on her solo career. Her debut extended play (EP) Felt, Not Heard was released through US independent label Cleopatra Records on 12 November 2012. The EP was written in the wake of her split from Sandilands.

== Other ventures ==
=== Dancing with the Stars ===
In 2010, Jaber was selected along with other celebrities to appear on the tenth season of Dancing with the Stars. Her dancing partner on the show was Carmello Pizzino. Throughout the season, Jaber was at the top of the leaderboard, winning the highest score for each week, all except for week four. This included week one for the Cha-Cha-Cha, week two for the Tango, week three for the Paso Doble, week five for the Samba, week six for the Aussie Smooth, week seven for the Jive, week eight for the Salsa and week nine for the Segue and the Swing Dance Off, between the four remaining stars. In week 10, Jaber also received the highest score out of the three remaining stars for the Rumba and the Cha-Cha-Cha. The grand finale was held on 29 August 2010 and Jaber was announced runner-up to Rob Palmer.

Performances and results

Week #	Dance/Song	Judges' score			Result
Week #	Dance/Song	Todd	Helen	Mark	Result
1	Cha-Cha-Cha	8	8	9	Safe
2	Tango	10	9	9	Safe
3	Paso Doble	8	8	8	Safe
4	Quickstep	7	7	8	Bottom Two
5	Samba	9	9	10	Safe
6	Aussie Smooth	9	9	9	Safe
7	Foxtrot	7	8	8	Safe
Jive	9	9	9	Safe	
8	Salsa	10	10	10	Safe
Viennese Waltz	8	9	9	Safe	
9	Quickstep	9	9	9	Safe
Segue: Tango; Paso Doble; Cha-Cha-Cha	9	9	10	Safe	
10	Rumba	10	10	10	Safe
Cha-Cha-Cha Showdown	9	9	9	Safe	
Freestyle	9	9	9	Runner-Up	

== Personal life ==
On 28 September 2008, Jaber married then boyfriend and radio presenter Kyle Sandilands. However, after two years of the marriage, on 12 July 2010 it was announced in the media that the couple had split. In November 2023, Jaber gave birth to a daughter, Hermione.

== Discography ==
=== Extended plays ===
List of extended plays
Title	EP details
Felt, Not Heard	Released: 12 November 2012 (Australia); Label: Cleopatra; Format: Digital download

=== Singles ===
==== As lead artist ====
List of singles, with selected chart positions
Title	Year	Peak chart positions
Title	Year	AUS
"Ooh Ahh"	2005	13
"Hard for Me"	2005	23

==== As featured artist ====
List of featured singles
Title	Year
"Ice Ice Baby" (Kacey Baker featuring Tamara Jaber)	2004

=== Music videos ===
List of music videos
Title	Year	Director(s)
"Ooh Ahh"	2005	
"Hard for Me"	2005	
