= Scandal'us =

Former Australian band

- Origin: Australia
- Genres: Pop, funk, dance-pop
- Years active: 2001–2002
- Labels: Festival Mushroom Records
- Past members: Jason Bird; Daniela Scala; Tamara Jaber; Simon Dicham; Anna Belperio

Scandal'us (or Scandal'Us) were the winners of the Australian Popstars 2 in 2001 (successors of Bardot, the winners of the first Australian Popstars in 2000). They won an ARIA chart award for their No. 1 debut single "Me, Myself & I". Their second and final single, "Make Me Crazy", only reached No. 30. Their debut album, Startin' Somethin', debuted and peaked at No. 2 on the ARIA Albums Chart. The group disbanded in 2002.

== Members ==
- Anna Belperio (from Adelaide)
- Jason Bird (from Melbourne)
- Simon Ditcham (from Hobart)
- Tamara Jaber (from Sydney)
- Daniela Scala (from Adelaide)

== Solo releases ==
Tamara Jaber released two solo singles, "Ooh Ahh" and "Hard for Me" under the mononym Tamara. Both reached the ARIA Top 30. Tamara was the only person signed to her radio personality ex-husband Kyle Sandilands's label King Kyle Records. He was criticised for promoting his girlfriend's single on his popular radio show. A solo album was meant for release but never eventuated. In 2008, Tamara sought a record deal in Los Angeles.

Around 2003, Jason Bird recorded a single to be distributed through his dance workshop website. He performed the track on Channel Nine's Mornings with Kerri-Anne show.

== Discography ==
=== Albums ===
Title	Details	Peak chart positions	Certifications
Title	Details	AUS	Certifications
Startin' Somethin'	Released: 7 May 2001; Label: Song Zu Records / Festival Mushroom (333862); Format: CD	2	ARIA: Platinum

=== Singles ===
Title	Year	Peak chart positions	Certifications	Album
Title	Year	AUS	Certifications	Album
"Me, Myself & I"	2001	1	ARIA: 2× Platinum	Startin' Somethin'
"Make Me Crazy"	2001	30		Startin' Somethin'

== Awards and nominations ==
=== ARIA Music Awards ===
The ARIA Music Awards is an annual awards ceremony that recognises excellence, innovation, and achievement across all genres of Australian music. They commenced in 1987.

Year	Nominee / work	Award	Result	Ref.
2001	"My, Myself and I"	Highest Selling Single	Won	
2001	Kelley Abbey for "My, Myself and I"	Best Video	Nominated	

Preceded by Bardot	Australian Popstars winners 2001	Succeeded by Scott Cain
