= Reigan Derry =

Australian singer-songwriter (born 1988)

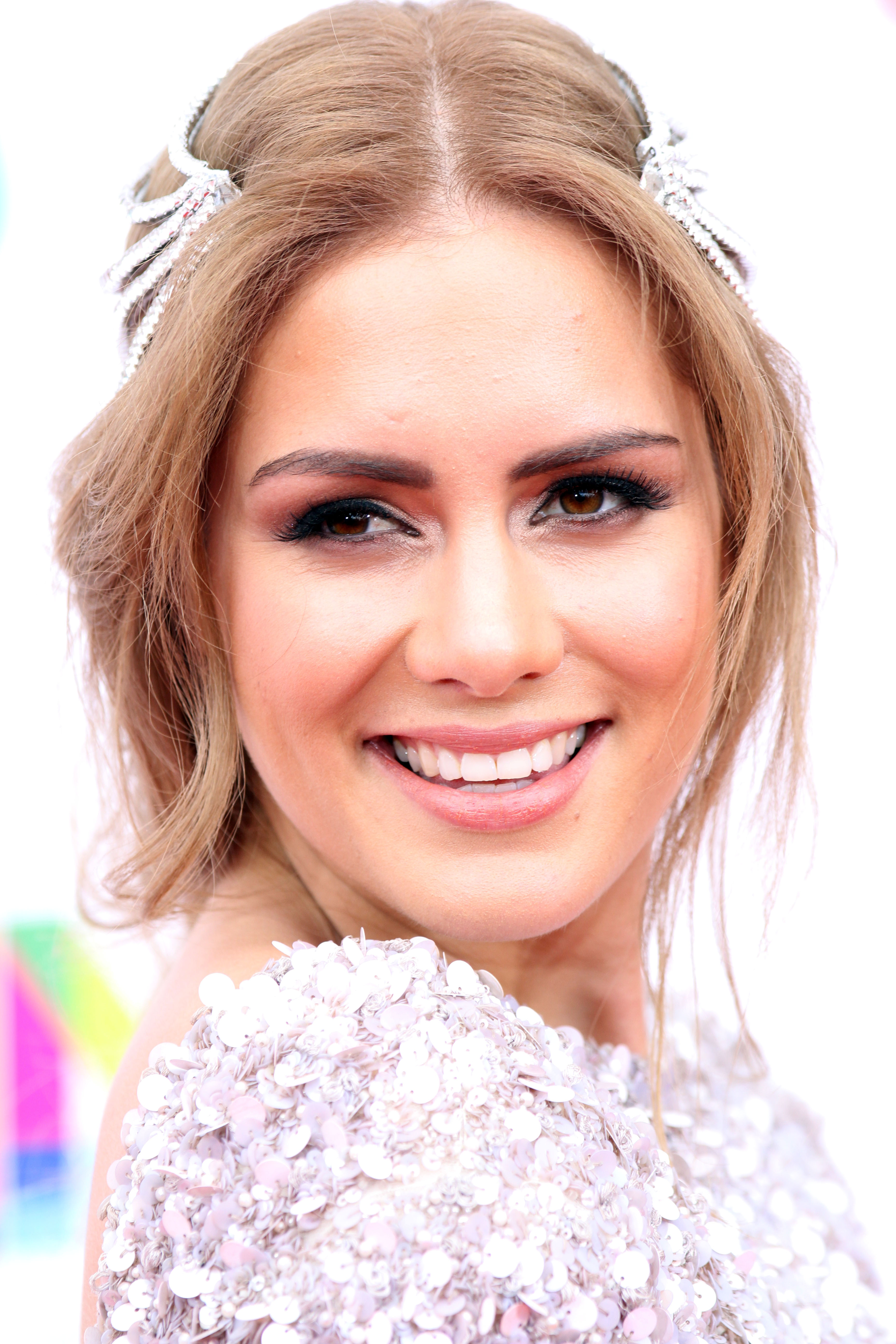
- Derry at the 2014 ARIA Music Awards

Background information
- Born: Reigan Elisse Derry; 19 September 1988 (age 38); Maida Vale, Western Australia
- Genre: Alternative pop
- Occupations: Singer; songwriter
- Instruments: Vocals; guitar; piano
- Years active: 2006–present
- Label: Sony
- Formerly of: Scarlett Belle

Reigan Elisse Derry (born 19 September 1988), also known mononymously as Reigan, is an Australian singer and songwriter. Derry rose to fame after placing eleventh on the fourth season of Australian Idol in 2006. The following year, she became a member of the Australian pop duo Scarlett Belle, who disbanded in 2011. Three years later, Derry became the tenth contestant eliminated on the sixth season of The X Factor Australia. She subsequently received a recording contract with Sony Music Australia and released her debut extended play, All of the Pieces, in December 2014. Currently Reigan works as a club singer for various agencies in Sydney and on the Gold Coast.

== Early life ==
Reigan Elisse Derry was born on 19 September 1988 in Maida Vale, Western Australia. Derry began singing at an early age and took on classical lessons at the age of fourteen. She was a student at Perth Modern School, where she completed a music scholarship majoring in voice. During her high school years, Derry had already worked with the West Australian Symphony Orchestra and was an understudy in the musical The King and I at the Regal Theatre. She was also a member of a Christian band called Djreamz. Prior to entering Australian Idol, Derry worked as a receptionist. Reigan is of Anglo Burmese ancestry.

== Career ==
=== 2006–2011: Scarlett Belle ===
At the age of eighteen, and after a brief stint on Australian Idol, Reigan relocated from Maida Vale to Sydney to pursue a pop career with Australian girl group, Scarlett Belle. The group signed a record deal with US label Def Jam Recordings in 2007. Based between Los Angeles and Sydney, Scarlett Belle began to work on their debut album with Ne-Yo, Snoop Dogg, JR Rotem, Nate Dogg and StarGate, as well as Australian producers Rudy Sandapa and Israel Cruz. However, in 2008, Scarlett Belle were dropped from Def Jam Recordings and founding member Hayley Aitken left the group, leaving Derry and fellow member Tamara Jaber as a duo. They later signed with Sony Music Australia and released their debut single "Closure" in June 2010, which peaked at number 38 on the ARIA Singles Chart.

Scarlett Belle released their second single in August 2010, a cover of Cruz's 2009 song "Freak Tonight". Featuring guest vocal appearances from Cruz and rapper Miracle, the song peaked at number 29 on the ARIA Singles Chart. Their third and final single "Lover Boy" was released in November 2010, but failed to impact the charts. In May 2011, it was announced that Scarlett Belle had disbanded to pursue their solo careers.

=== 2012-13: "With You" ===
In August 2013, Reigan Derry featured on the song "With You" by OLIC.

=== 2014–2016: The X factor, All of the Pieces and December ===
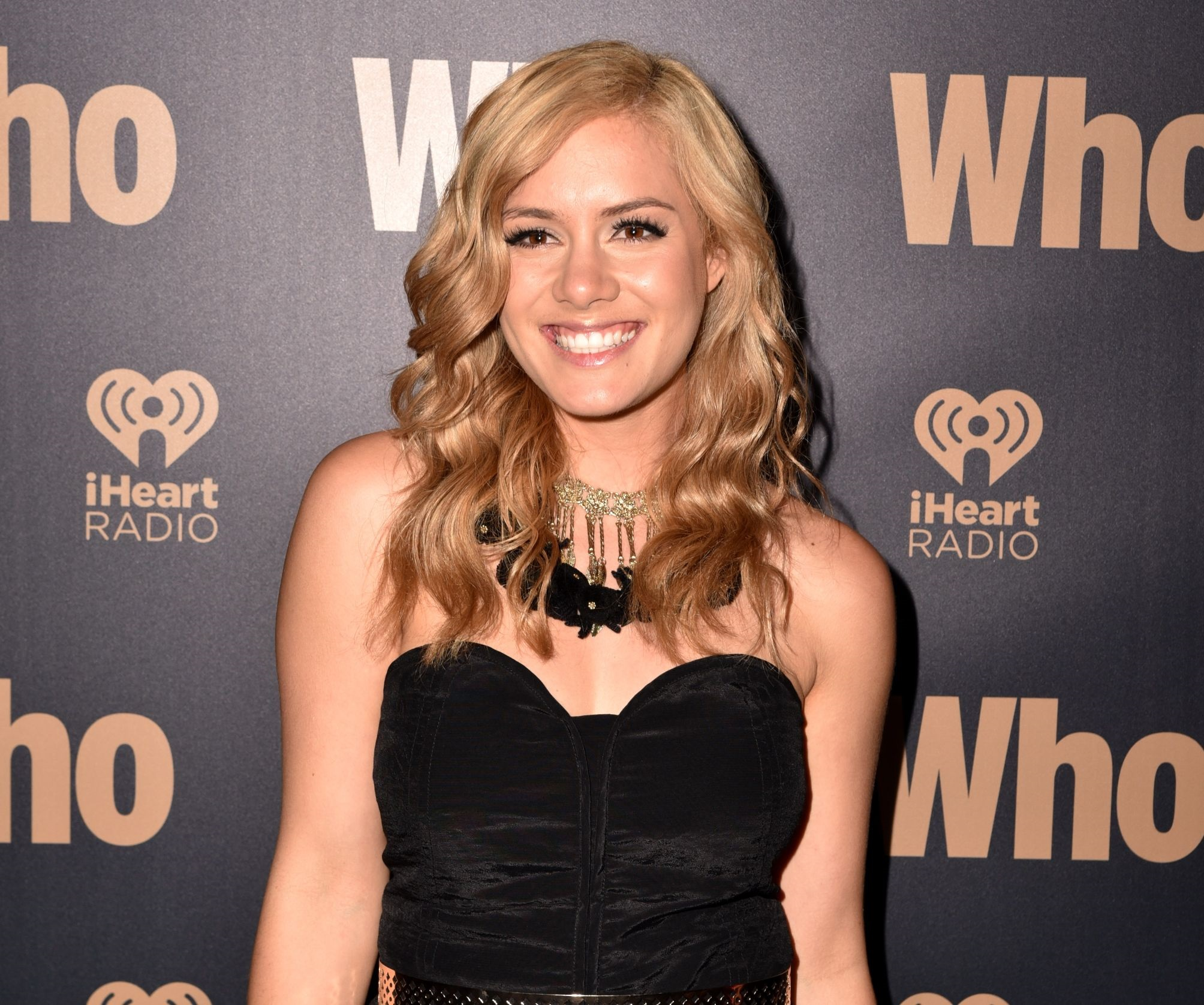
Derry in 2014

Reigan Derry was a 26-year who auditioned for The X Factor singing "Someone like You" by Adele and progressed to the super bootcamp round of the competition. For the first challenge of bootcamp, Derry was placed into a group with two other contestants from her category to perform a song together for the judges. Derry made it to the second bootcamp challenge, where she performed a ballad version of "Numb" by Linkin Park to the judges and a live audience of one thousand. She then progressed to the home visits round in Las Vegas and performed "Locked Out of Heaven" by Bruno Mars in front of her mentor Redfoo and guest mentor Nicole Scherzinger. Redfoo later selected Derry for the live shows. Derry was in the bottom two for the first time in week eight, with Jason Heerah, another act in the Over 25s category, but was saved after the judges' vote went to deadlock and Heerah was eliminated. After the eliminations of Rochelle Pitt in week six and Heerah in week eight, Derry became the last remaining contestant in Redfoo's category. Derry was in the bottom two again in week ten, this time with Marlisa Punzalan, but was eliminated after the judges' vote went to deadlock and she received the fewest public votes.

On 29 October 2014, it was announced that Derry had received a recording contract with Sony Music Australia. Derry's debut extended play, All of the Pieces, was released on 12 December 2014 and features studio recordings of selected songs she performed on The X Factor. The EP's title track was serviced to Australian radio stations on 27 November 2014 as Derry's debut solo single, and debuted at number 33 on the ARIA Singles Chart. Derry's second single "Feels Like Heaven" was released on 4 September 2015, as the lead single from her upcoming debut studio album, and debuted at number 37 on the ARIA Singles Chart. On 2 October 2015, she released "Always Know My Truth" as the album's second single, which did not chart. She worked on the album for nine months in Australia, Sweden and the UK with several songwriters, including Jake Gosling, Adam Argyle, Jon Hume, Trinity and David Ryan Harris. In March 2016, it was speculated that Derry had been dropped by record company Sony Music, along with other X Factor finalists Nathaniel Willemse, Marlisa Punzalan and Dean Ray.

==== Performances on The X Factor ====
Show	Theme	Song	Original artist(s)	Order	Result
Audition	Free choice	"Someone like You"	Adele	N/A	Through to super bootcamp
Super bootcamp 1	Group performance	"N/A"	N/A	N/A	Through to super bootcamp 2
Super bootcamp 2	Solo performance	"Numb"	Linkin Park	N/A	Through to home visits
Home visits	Free choice	"Locked Out of Heaven"	Bruno Mars	N/A	Through to live shows
Week 1	Judges' Choice	"Unconditionally"	Katy Perry	13	Safe
Week 2	Legends	"Toxic"	Britney Spears	5	Safe
Week 3	Decades Challenge	"Chandelier"	Sia	9	Safe
Week 4	Top 10 Hits	"Stay with Me"	Sam Smith	4	Safe
Week 5	Latest and Greatest	"Bang Bang"	Jessie J, Ariana Grande & Nicki Minaj	9	Safe (3rd)
Week 6	Rock	"Boys in Town"	Divinyls	5	Safe
Week 7	Judges' Challenge	"Dog Days Are Over"	Florence + the Machine	3	Safe
Week 8	Power and Passion	"Burn for You"	John Farnham	3	Bottom two (5th)
Week 8	Final Showdown	"Stay"	Rihanna	2	Safe
Week 9	Killer Tracks and Curveballs	"Only Girl (In the World)"	Rihanna	10	Safe
Week 9	Killer Tracks and Curveballs	"Creep"	Radiohead	3	Safe
Week 10 (Semi-Final)	Power and Passion	"Can't Remember to Forget You"	Shakira ft. Rihanna	4	Bottom two (4th)
Week 10 (Semi-Final)	Power and Passion	"Only Love Can Hurt Like This"	Paloma Faith	7	Bottom two (4th)
Week 10 (Semi-Final)	Final Showdown	"Hallelujah	Jeff Buckley	1	Eliminated (4th place)

=== 2019–present ===
In March 2019, Reigan featured on a Bombs Away's cover version of "You Gotta Be" and Some's Blonde's "Set You Free".

After being dropped by her record company, Reigan became a vocalist for hire and recorded a number of demo vocals to be used as a guide. One of the demos she recorded was of her singing Fleetwood Mac's "Dreams", which was then used in the dance version by Jolyon Petch. This cover version, which reached number 16 on the ARIA Singles Chart and number one on the ARIA Club Tracks chart. However, as the vocal was only supposed to be for demo purposes, Reigan alleged that the New Zealand-born producer had used her cover without her consent or any written agreement between the two artists and that she had received no royalties from the hit record. This dispute was later settled between the two artists in 2022, and she has since been credited on the track across all platforms.

In 2023, Reigan was selected to sing the Australian National Anthem at the 2023 Australian Grand Prix at the Albert Park Circuit.

Reigan is one of the featured vocalists in the Ministry of Sound Classical 2024 and 2025 Australian National Tours

== Artistry ==
Aside from singing, Derry also plays the guitar and piano. Reigan includes a variety of singers and musician's as her musical influences.

== Discography ==
=== Extended plays ===
List of extended plays
Title	Album details
All of the Pieces	Released: 12 December 2014 (Australia); Label: Sony Music Australia; Formats: CD, digital download
December	Released: 11 December 2015 (Australia); Label: Sony Music Australia; Format: Digital download
All Day I Dream (with Double Touch)	Released: 9 December 2022; Label: All Day I Dream; Format: Digital download

=== Singles ===
List of singles
Title	Year	Peak chart positions	Certifications	Album
Title	Year	AUS	Certifications	Album
"With You" (OLIC featuring Reigan)	2013	—		non-album single
"All of the Pieces"	2014	33		All of the Pieces
"Feels Like Heaven"	2015	37		non-album singles
"Always Know My Truth"	2015	—		non-album singles
"You Gotta Be" (Bombs Away featuring Reigan)	2019	— (Note: "You Gotta Be" did not enter the ARIA Singles Chart, but peaked at number 37 on the ARIA Digital Track Chart.)		non-album singles
"Set You Free" (Some Blonde and Reigan)	2019	—		non-album singles
"You Love" (RIP Youth & Bombs Away featuring Reigan)	2020	—		non-album singles
"Greatest Day" (Double Touch featuring Reigan)	2020	—		non-album singles
"Wide Eyed" (Double Touch featuring Reigan)	2021	—		non-album singles
"I Wanna Dance with Somebody" (Uncanny Valley featuring Reigan)	2021	—		non-album singles
"Dreams" (Jolyon Petch featuring Reigan) (Note: Initially, "Dream" featured uncredited vocals from Reigan but in a settlement in 2022, the song became officially credited to Jolyon Petch featuring Reigan.)	2021	16	ARIA: 2× Platinum	non-album singles
"How Can I Blame You" (Double Touch featuring Reigan)	2021	—		Infinite Nocturne
"I Believe in Us"	2021	—		Arknights (soundtrack)
"We Fall"	2021	—		non-album singles
"Running Up That Hill" (with Bombs Away)	2022	—		non-album singles
"French Loves House" (with Scotty Call)	2022	—		non-album singles
"Loaded Gun" (with Bombs Away)	2023	—		non-album singles
"Great Southern Land" (with Mitch Tambo)	2023	—		non-album singles

== Notes ==
=== Other charted songs ===
List of non-single songs
Title	Year	Peak chart positions	
Title	Year	AUS	NZ
"Chandelier"	2014	81	—
"Stay with Me"	2014	20	28
"Bang Bang"	2014	53	—
"Dog Days Are Over"	2014	61	—
"Burn for You"	2014	78	—
"Only Love Can Hurt Like This"	2014	63	—
"—" denotes a song that did not chart in that country.

=== Music videos ===
List of music videos
Title	Year	Director(s)
"All of the Pieces"	2014	Gemma Lee
"Feels Like Heaven"	2015	Mitchel Tuul and Hugh Martin
"You Gotta Be" (with Bombs Away)	2019	Matthew and Thomas Coleman
"Great Southern Land" (with Mitch Tambo)	2023	

== Awards and nominations ==
=== ARIA Music Awards ===
The ARIA Music Awards is an annual awards ceremony that recognises excellence, innovation, and achievement across all genres of the music of Australia.

Year	Nominee / work	Award	Result	Ref.
2022	"Dreams" (Jolyon Petch feat. Reigan)	Song of the Year	Nominated	
