= Ooh Ahh =

Ooh Ahh or Ooh Aah may refer to:

- "Ooh Ahh" (GRITS song)
- "Ooh Ahh" (Tamara Jaber song)
- "Ooh Aah... Just a Little Bit", a song by Gina G
- "Oooh Ahh", a song by Danity Kane from their self-titled album

== See also ==
- Ooh, Aah & You, a series of short programs for children
- Ooh arr, a phrase used in West Country English
