= All of the Pieces =

Single by Reigan Derry

from the album All of the Pieces
- Released: 27 November 2014
- Recorded: 2014
- Genre: Alternative pop
- Length: 3:31
- Label: Sony
- Songwriters: Adam Argyle; Becky Hill; Martin Brammer
- Producers: Adam Argyle; Martin Brammer

Reigan Derry singles chronology
"All of the Pieces" (2014)	"Feels Like Heaven" (2015)

"All of the Pieces" is the debut solo single by Australian recording artist Reigan Derry. It was written by Adam Argyle, Becky Hill and Martin Brammer, and produced by Argyle and Brammer. "All of the Pieces" was released to Australian radio on 27 November 2014 as the lead single from Derry's first extended play of the same name. Musically, "All of the Pieces" is a mid-tempo alternative pop ballad with folk influences. The song received a positive reception from various publications and was compared to works by several other artists, including Florence and the Machine, Marina and the Diamonds, Paloma Faith and Ella Henderson.

Upon its release, "All of the Pieces" debuted at number thirty-three on the ARIA Singles Chart. The accompanying music video was directed by Gemma Lee and features Derry singing the song's lyrics in a rainforest. "All of the Pieces" was promoted with live performances and used in a Seven Network commercial for the American television series State of Affairs.

== Background and release ==
Derry originally began her recording career as a member of the Australian girl group Scarlett Belle. After three singles releases, the group disbanded in May 2011 to focus on individual pursuits. Three years later, Derry auditioned for the sixth season of The X Factor Australia and successfully progressed to the live shows. She was eliminated in the semi-final week of the competition and finished in fourth place. On 29 October 2014, it was revealed that Derry had signed a recording contract with Sony Music Australia and would be releasing "All of the Pieces" as her debut solo single. The song also served as the lead single from Derry's first extended play of the same name. "All of the Pieces" was originally scheduled to impact Australian radio stations on 20 November 2014. However, its radio release was pushed back by one week to 27 November.

== Production and composition ==
"All of the Pieces" is a mid-tempo alternative pop ballad with folk influences. The song was written in the United Kingdom by Adam Argyle, Becky Hill and Martin Brammer, and produced by Argyle and Brammer. In an interview with Jessie Papain of The West Australian, Derry recalled the moment she first heard "All of the Pieces", saying: "At first I loved the sound – the melody and chorus is really unique. But it also has a really strong message to it, which I really connected with." Papain noted that the ballad "has an ethereal, Florence and the Machine-like quality to it". Amy Nelmes of MusicFix also likened its sound to Florence and the Machine as well as Marina and the Diamonds, and noted that Derry adopts "softer, folky tones" in the song.

Chris Jameson of Joy 94.9 found the single to be "very reminiscent of Paloma Faith and Ella Henderson", while Kirsten Maree of Renowned for Sound felt it "lands somewhere between a MS MR and Emeli Sandé track". Derry elaborated on the concept of "All of the Pieces" in a press statement, saying: "The song talks about people looking for help. As individuals we go through times where we feel completely fragile, alone, helpless and scared. The song is about coming together to fix who you are – it's about reaching out and connecting with people, or something in nature, to fix what's going on in your life."

== Reception ==
Kathy McCabe of The Daily Telegraph described "All of the Pieces" as an "epic single" which is "reminiscent of the Florence and the Machine style" that goes with Derry's "voice and personality". Joy 94.9's Chris Jameson called it an "emotive" ballad and concluded that Derry "could have a hit on her hands". Nic Kelly of Project U wrote that the song is "really amazing" and noted that it is "a sign of exciting things to come" from Derry. Renowned for Sound's Kirsten Maree described "All of the Pieces" as "dark, edgy" and "cool". She further praised Derry for staying "subtle with the vocal" and waiting until the final chorus "to go full blown talent show" on the track.

Michael James of Q News described "All of the Pieces" as "dark and lilting" and "gently anthemic and moving", noting that it is "a far cry from the bubblegum pop" people would have expected to hear from Derry. James further added, "The song plays to the strength of her vocals, utilising her diverse range, striking the highs and lows in equal balance rather than relying on power notes and diva styling." For the issue dated 22 December 2014, "All of the Pieces" debuted at number thirty-three on the ARIA Singles Chart and gave Derry her second top forty entry, following her X Factor performance of Sam Smith's "Stay with Me", which debuted at number twenty. "All of the Pieces" also became Derry's seventh overall top one hundred entry, and only spent one week on that chart.

== Music video and promotion ==
The music video was directed by Gemma Lee and filmed on 7 November 2014. It was released on 11 December 2014 via Derry's Vevo account on YouTube. The video features Derry dressed in white and singing the song's lyrics in a rainforest, while storylines about three people are intercut through it. Towards the end of the video, Derry is seen levitating into the air. In December 2014, "All of the Pieces" was used in a commercial promoting the 2015 premiere of the American television series State of Affairs on the Seven Network in Australia. On 8 December 2014, Derry performed "All of the Pieces" on board the MS Voyager of the Seas ship at Sydney's Circular Quay. She also performed the song on Sunrise on 12 December 2014.

== Charts ==
Chart (2014)	Peak position
Australia (ARIA)	33

== Release history ==
Region	Date	Format	Label
Australia	27 November 2014	Radio	Sony Music Australia

== All of the Pieces EP ==
All of the Pieces

EP by Reigan Derry
- Released: 12 December 2014
- Recorded: 2014
- Label: Sony
- Producers: Adam Argyle; Martin Brammer; Dorian West

Reigan Derry chronology
All of the Pieces (2014)	December (2015)

Singles from All of the Pieces
- 1. "All of the Pieces" Released: 27 November 2014

All of the Pieces is the first extended play (EP) by Derry, released through Sony Music Australia on 12 December 2014. The five-track EP contains her debut solo single of the same name and four studio recordings of songs she performed as a top twelve finalist on The X Factor Australia, including a previously unheard downtempo rearrangement of Rihanna's "Only Girl (In the World)".

=== Release and promotion ===
On 30 October 2014, Derry announced the release date for All of the Pieces via her social media platforms and it became available to pre-order on the iTunes Store. The EP was then released both digitally and physically on 12 December 2014. Kirsten Maree of Renowned for Sound awarded All of the Pieces two-and-a-half stars out of five and praised the title track, but had mixed feelings towards the covers as she preferred the original versions.

On 6 December 2014, Derry performed songs from All of the Pieces at iHeartRadio's first Ultimate Pool Party at the Ivy Pool Club in Sydney. On the day of the EP's release, Derry performed the title track on Sunrise and "Hallelujah" on The Morning Show. She also signed copies of the EP during appearances at Bond Café in Sydney (12 December 2014) and the Logan Hyperdome Shopping Centre in Shailer Park (20 December 2014).

=== Track listing ===
No.	Title	Writer(s)	Length
1.	"All of the Pieces"	Adam Argyle; Becky Hill; Martin Brammer	3:31
2.	"Dog Days Are Over" (Florence and the Machine song)	Florence Welch; Isabella Summers	3:32
3.	"Only Girl (In the World)" (Rihanna song)	Crystal Johnson; Mikkel S. Eriksen; Tor Erik Hermansen; Sandy Wilhelm	4:02
4.	"Stay with Me" (Sam Smith song)	James Napier; William Phillips; Sam Smith	2:54
5.	"Hallelujah" (Leonard Cohen song)	Leonard Cohen	4:00

=== Release history ===
Region	Date	Format	Label	Catalogue
Australia	12 December 2014	CD; digital download	Sony Music Australia	88875049782
