= Australian Institute of Music =

School in New South Wales, Australia

- Former name: Sydney Guitar School
- Established: 1968; 58 years ago
- Founder: Peter Calvo
- Chancellor: Ed St John
- Vice-Chancellor: Dr Greg Clarke
- Students: 1,300 (2019)
- Location: Harrington Street, The Rocks, Sydney, New South Wales; King Street, Melbourne central business district, Victoria, Australia; 33°53′03″S 151°12′34″E
- Campus: Urban
- Website: www.aim.edu.au
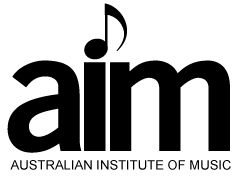

- Location in greater metropolitan Sydney

The Australian Institute of Music (AIM) is an Australian private tertiary education provider, with campuses in Sydney, New South Wales and Melbourne, Victoria.

Founded in 1968, AIM delivers education for careers in the Australian music, entertainment and performing arts industries. Its music and performing arts courses offer accredited undergraduate and postgraduate studies in contemporary performance, classical performance, audio engineering, composition and music production, musical theatre, theatre performance and acting, arts and entertainment management.

The main AIM Sydney campus is located in Harrington Street, The Rocks, with the AIM Melbourne Campus located at King Street, Melbourne. Both campuses offer a wide range of music degrees and diplomas.

As of January 2019, there were 1,300 students enrolled at AIM.

== Courses ==
The Australian Institute of Music offers a range of several courses for both undergraduate and postgraduate studies, including:

Undergraduate

- Bachelor of Music – Audio
- Bachelor of Music – Classical
- Bachelor of Music – Contemporary
- Bachelor of Music – Composition & Music Production
- Diploma of Music
- Bachelor of Music – Music Theatre
- Bachelor of Music – Arts Management
- Bachelor of Entertainment Management
- Bachelor of Performance (Dramatic Arts)

Postgraduate

- Masters of Music
- Master of Arts & Entertainment Management

== Productions and performances ==
Showcase events – Three times a year AIM stages its major Showcase events, featuring the talents of students across many of its departments collaborative performances, most recently in late 2018 with a performance of the 1974 Broadway musical The Wiz, an adaption of L. Frank Baum's The Wonderful Wizard of Oz.

AIM also regularly hosts performances from across a variety of disciplines.

In 2025 Indonesian composer and pianist Ananda Sukarlan was invited to be the Composer in Residence of AIM which resulted in an increase of popularity of AIM among Indonesian (potential) students as well as raising interest in Indonesian music among Australian classical music circles.

== Acquisitions ==
In 2006, AIM acquired the Australian Academy of Dramatic Arts (AADA) as part of its goal to create a performing arts university through the merger of multiple tertiary independent schools.

== Notable alumni ==
- Balawan (born I Wayan Balawan; 1972) – musician and educator
- Vera Blue (born Celia Pavey; 1994) – Australian pop singer-songwriter
- Nicholas Cartwright (born 1988) - Australian actor and Home and Away star
- Casey Donovan (born 1988) – winner of season 2 of Australian Idol
- Aurell Marcella Felicia (born 1998) - Indonesian violinist, member of the G20 Orchestra
- Tamara Jaber (born 1982) – Australian recording artist
- Tia Jordan (Sydney Opera House/ Australian Institute of Music postgraduate scholar, Arts Management ) – Producer, director, choreographer - and senior lecturer of Bachelor Music (Music Theatre) from 2007 - 2017
- Hannah Joy – Australian singer/songwriter and lead vocalist of Australian indie rock band Middle Kids
- Omid Moheb-Zadeh - founder and conductor of the Sydney Concert Orchestra
- Bianca Moon – composer for CBS-TV Hollywood's Bold and the Beautiful
- Amanda Palmer (born 1976) – director and journalist
- Palmy (born Eve Pancharoen; 1981) – Thai–Belgian pop singer
- The Preatures (formed 2010) – Australian indie rock band
  - Isabella Manfredi – lead vocalist and keyboardist
  - Jack Moffitt – guitarist
  - Thomas Champion – bass guitarist
- Jackie Sannia – Australian singer and finalist on season 2 of The Voice Australia
- Chris Sorbello – Australian singer, songwriter and dancer
- Evgeny Ukhanov (born 1982) – Ukrainian–Australian pianist and winner of 3rd prize in the Sydney International Piano Competition in 2000
- Mark Vincent (born 1993) – Australian tenor
- Tarisai Vushe – Australian–Zimbabwe-born singer in the 2014 production of The Lion King
- Three Wishez – Australian band
- Tiffani Wood (born 1977) – Australian singer-songwriter and former member of Bardot
- Charmaine Bingwa (born 1985) – actress
