= Feels Like Heaven =

Feels Like Heaven may refer to:

- Feels Like Heaven (album), a 1995 album by Pigface
- "(Feels Like) Heaven", a 1984 song by Fiction Factory
- "Feels Like Heaven (Peter Cetera and Chaka Khan song)", 1992
- "Feels Like Heaven" (Urban Cookie Collective song), 1993
- "Feels Like Heaven" (Reigan Derry song), 2015
- "Feels Like Heaven", a 1976 song by soft rock band Easy Street
- "Feels Like Heaven", a 1992 song by Kenny Vaughan and The Art of Love from the Boomerang soundtrack
