= Freak Tonight =

Single by Israel Cruz

from the album The Legacy
- B-side: "Gemini"
- Released: 18 March 2009
- Genre: R&B
- Length: 3:50
- Label: Nufirm Records
- Songwriter: Israel Cruz
- Producer: Israel Cruz

Israel Cruz singles chronology
"Gemini" (2007)	"Freak Tonight" (2009)	"Freak Tonight" (2010)

Music video
- "Freak Tonight" on YouTube

"Freak Tonight" is a song by Australian singer and songwriter Israel Cruz. It was written by Cruz and released as the lead single from his second studio album, The Legacy. It was made available for digital download on 18 March 2009, followed by a CD release on 23 March 2009. The song only managed to reach number 68 on the ARIA Physical Singles Chart. A club-themed music video accompanied the single's release.

Australian pop duo Scarlett Belle covered the song in 2010, which featured guest vocals from Cruz and rapper Miracle. Their version of "Freak Tonight" peaked at number 29 on the ARIA Singles Chart.

== Reception ==
A writer for Auspop was impressed with the song's "infectious lyrics and stomping bassline". A writer from Tone Casualties Music commented that "it would be the perfect tune to listen to when all you want to do is to veg out or do nothing at all." Editors from Pop Trash Addicts compared to the song to Taio Cruz. On 30 March 2009, "Freak Tonight" debuted at number 94 on the ARIA Physical Singles Chart and peaked at number 68 the following week. It spent seven consecutive weeks on the chart.

== Music video ==
The video begins with crowds of people making an entrance into what seems to be a party. It then cuts to Cruz being surrounded by a large crowd as they dance slowly. There is also a scene which cuts to a human with vampire-like fangs bitting into the neck of a woman. Cruz and the crowd then begin to move past a bar. A zombie-like woman then performs choreography backed by a group of both male and female dancers. The final scene incorporates Cruz with vampire-like fangs biting into the shoulders of another female, and then cuts to the crowd dancing whilst raising their arms high once again.

== Track listing ==
- Digital EP
1. "Freak Tonight" – 3:50
2. "Freak Tonight" (Instrumental) – 3:50
3. "Gemini" featuring Fabolous – 3:41
4. "Gemini" (Nufirm Remix) – 4:33

== Charts ==
Chart (2009)	Peak position
Australia Physical (ARIA)	68

== Scarlett Belle version ==
"Freak Tonight"

Single by Scarlett Belle featuring Israel Cruz and Miracle
- Released: 10 September 2010
- Genre: Pop
- Length: 3:46
- Label: Young & Vicious; Sony
- Songwriters: Israel Cruz; Blessed Samuel Joe-Andah
- Producer: Israel Cruz

Scarlett Belle singles chronology
"Closure" (2010)	"Freak Tonight" (2010)	"Lover Boy" (2010)

Israel Cruz singles chronology
"Freak Tonight" (2009)	"Freak Tonight" (2010)	"Hold It Down" (2010)

Miracle singles chronology
"Freak Tonight" (2010)	"Better Dayz" (2010)

Music video
- "Freak Tonight" on YouTube

"Freak Tonight" was covered by Australian pop duo Scarlett Belle and released as their second single. Featuring guest vocals from both Cruz and rapper Miracle, the song was made available for digital download on 10 September 2010. When interviewed by The Daily Telegraph, Tamara Jaber, a member of the duo, said they wanted to release "something upbeat and fun", following her split from ex-husband Kyle Sandilands and her appearance on Dancing with the Stars.

=== Reception ===
A writer for Pop Trash Addicts said the song was more "enjoyable" than their debut single "Closure". A writer from The Prophet Blog said it was an "urban-dance banger" that was out of date. On 20 September 2010, "Freak Tonight" debuted at number 40 on the ARIA Singles Chart and peaked at number 29 on 18 October 2010. It spent eight consecutive weeks in the top fifty. The song also ranked at number 40 on the Australian Artist End of Year Singles Chart of 2010.

=== Music video ===
The music video was directed by Simon Smith and released onto YouTube on 13 October 2010. It begins with a traditional Australian bloke in a garage who turns on his television during his break to discover Scarlett Belle on TV getting his attention. They play different characters such as the news presenter women, the housewives, the soap opera stars, the fitness freaks, and vixens pillow-fighting on the bed. Miracle raps his verse during the news segment with Reigan Derry, while Cruz raps his verse from New York City.

=== Track listing ===
- Digital download
1. "Freak Tonight" (featuring Israel Cruz and Miracle) – 3:46
2. "Freak Tonight" – 3:28

=== Weekly charts ===
Chart (2010)	Peak position
Australia (ARIA)	29

=== Year-end charts ===
Chart (2010)	Position
Australian Artist Singles Chart	40
