= Stefano Manfredi =

Stefano "Steve" Manfredi (born 1954) is an Italian-born chef, author and leading exponent of modern Italian cuisine in Australia. He has opened and operated several restaurants in Sydney since 1983, most notably The Restaurant Manfredi and Bel Mondo (sold in 2002). Manfredi has written on food and cooking since 1988, is a regular columnist for The Sydney Morning Herald, and is the author of four books; Fresh From Italy (1993), Bel Mondo: Beautiful World (2000), Seasonal (2007), and Seasonal Italian Favourites (2009). He is also the developer of coffee brand "Espresso di Manfredi" by Piazza d'Oro.

Manfredi is often invited to cook, teach and speak on food in Sydney, interstate and overseas, including The International Olive Oil Council in New Zealand, Mediterranean Gastronomy Conference in Stresa, Italy and has previously cooked in Jakarta, Hong Kong, Singapore and Rome. In January 2002, Steve represented The Taste of Australia in New York City with Neil Perry and Kylie Kwong.

As of 2009, Manfredi's projects include Bells at Killcare and Pretty Beach House, located one and a half hours north of Sydney.

He is the father of Australian singer-songwriter Isabella Manfredi, front-woman of The Preatures.

== Early life ==
Manfredi was born in the small Lombard town of Gottolengo in northern Italy. His family migrated to Australia in 1961 by ship. There they spent a brief period at the Bonegilla Migrant Reception and Training Centre near Wodonga, before settling in Blacktown, New South Wales, west of Sydney.

== Awards ==
In 1994 The Restaurant Manfredi was awarded the coveted Sydney Morning Herald three chef hat award. In 1998 and 1999, bel mondo was awarded American Express Best Sydney Restaurant, Best NSW Restaurant, and the 'Insegna del Ristorante' from the Italian government. In 2002 Steve was winner of the inaugural International ICIF award presented in Italy.
