= Blue Planet Eyes =

Studio album by the Preatures
- Released: 30 September 2014
- Length: 38:13
- Labels: Mosy; Universal Music Australia
- Producers: Jim Eno; Jack Moffitt

The Preatures chronology
| Is This How You Feel? (2013) | Blue Planet Eyes (2014) | Girlhood (2017) |

Singles from Blue Planet Eyes
- 1. "Two Tone Melody" Released: 1 January 2014; 2. "Somebody's Talking" Released: 2014; 3. "Cruel" Released: 2015

Professional ratings
Review scores
| Source | Rating |
|---|---|
| AllMusic | 4/5 stars |
| The Music | 3.5/5 stars |
| The Sydney Morning Herald | 4/5 stars |

Blue Planet Eyes is the debut studio album by Australian rock band the Preatures, released on 30 September 2014 through Mosy Recordings and Universal Music Australia.

Blue Planet Eyes debuted and peaked at number 4 on the ARIA Albums Chart and was certified gold in 2018. The single version of the song "It Gets Better", retitled "Better Than It Ever Could Be", was featured in the online setlist for Guitar Hero Live in 2015.

The album includes their 2013 breakthrough single, "Is This How You Feel?".

== Track listing ==
| No. | Title | Writer(s) | Length |
|---|---|---|---|
| 1. | "Blue Planet Eyes" | Isabella Manfredi; Jack Moffitt | 3:04 |
| 2. | "Somebody's Talking" | Isabella Manfredi; Jack Moffitt | 3:28 |
| 3. | "Is This How You Feel?" | Thomas Champion; Luke Davison; Manfredi; Moffitt | 3:34 |
| 4. | "Ordinary" | Gideon Bensen; Champion; Davison; Manfredi; Moffitt | 3:48 |
| 5. | "Two Tone Melody" | Isabella Manfredi | 4:26 |
| 6. | "Rock and Roll Rave" | Bensen; Champion; Davison; Manfredi; Moffitt | 3:50 |
| 7. | "Whatever You Want" | Manfredi | 3:03 |
| 8. | "Cruel" | Bensen; Manfredi; Moffitt | 2:58 |
| 9. | "It Gets Better" | Bensen; Champion; Davison; Manfredi; Moffitt | 3:33 |
| 10. | "Business, Yeah" | Manfredi | 2:53 |
| 11. | "Is This How You Feel?" (Classixx Remix) | Champion; Davison; Manfredi; Moffitt | 3:36 |
| Total length: | | | 38:13 |

== Charts ==
=== Weekly charts ===
| Chart (2014) | Peak position |
|---|---|
| Australian Albums (ARIA) | 4 |

=== Year-end charts ===
| Chart (2014) | Position |
|---|---|
| Australian Artist Albums (ARIA) | 48 |

== Certifications ==
| Region | Certification | Certified units/sales |
|---|---|---|
| Australia (ARIA) | Gold | 35,000^{‡} |
^{‡} Sales+streaming figures based on certification alone.
