= Jack Moffitt (musician) =

Australian musician

Jack Moffitt is an Australian musician. He is known for his work as a member of indie rock band The Preatures (2010-2021), in which he worked as guitarist, vocalist, and producer. He used the alias Jak Orion on a 2010 release.

== Early life and education ==
Jack Moffitt attended Newington College in Sydney, New South Wales, graduating high school in 2007. Along with his Preatures bandmate Tom Champion, he studied the Music 1 course in Years 11 and 12, and was also active in promoting and developing the contemporary music program. He was 2nd Captain of Music in his final year of school.

In 2008 Moffitt and Champion both attended the Australian Institute of Music, where they met Isabella Manfredi, another future member of The Preatures.

== Career ==
=== The Preatures ===
Moffitt, Champion, and Manfredi formed a band together first, before meeting vocalist and guitarist Gideon Bensen at the Lansdowne Hotel, and asking him to write songs for them. In 2010, they met Luke Davison and invited him to join the band, initially calling themselves the Preachers. In 2010 they released an EP called The Preachers, on which Moffitt used the alias Zak Orion. Moffitt and Manfredi became romantically involved and were partners through much of the existence of the band,

After changing their name to The Preatures, they signed to Mercury Records and released their debut EP, Shaking Hands. Manfredi was lead vocalist, while Moffitt played guitar and sang in the band as well as producing some of their music. In 2013, they released their second EP, Is This How You Feel?, preceded by two singles, including "Is This How You Feel?", which enjoyed considerable success, including winning the Vanda & Young Global Songwriting Competition."Is This How You Feel?" (written by Manfredi) attracted considerable success, winning the $50,000 Vanda & Young Global Songwriting Competition, Their 2014 debut album, Blue Planet Eyes, debuted at number four in the Australian charts, although none of the band members were happy with it at the time.

Apart from playing the guitar, Moffitt also did mixing and producing for the band, including producing the 2017 studio album Girlhood. Following a prolonged period of inactivity, and officially splitting in 2020, Manfredi confirmed the end of the Preatures in May 2021. The end of the relationship between Moffitt and Manfredi (in 2019), along with an "outdated" record contract that they were not happy with, were the main reasons for the breakup.

On 10 December 2024, the band reunited for a one-off performance at Sydney's Lansdowne Hotel, the first venue they had ever played, to commemorate their tenth anniversary, and reissued Blue Planet Eyes on vinyl to celebrate the occasion.

=== Other work ===
Moffitt joined Tyne-James Organ's band, along with Kelton Hirst and Andrew Banovich, performing at the Factory Theatre in Sydney 2021 and touring Australian capitals in 2023.

In 2023, Moffitt co-mixed the album The Art Of Pretending by Myths. Also in 2023, he played guitar on Elly-May Barnes' first solo single, a cover of the Radiohead song "Creep", on 20 November 2023.

== Personal life ==
Moffitt was in a relationship with Isabella Manfredi from around 2009 until 2019. In a 2021 interview with Rolling Stone Australia, she said that he was frequently unfaithful to her, and described his behaviour as "compulsive and deceptive". However she said that he was a "product of a culture where this behaviour is tolerated" and it was very common in the music industry. When the band reunited for a one-off concert in December 2024, the band issued a conciliatory statement, implying that the pair had managed to work together amicably.

== Awards and nominations ==
In 2014, Moffitt was nominated for an APRA AMCOS Screen Music Award, in the category "Best Music for a Short Film". This was for his work on the short film Blood Pulls a Gun, directed by Ben Briand. His co-nominee was fellow composer Basil Hogios.
