= Watch You Go =

Watch You Go may refer to:

- "Watch You Go", a 2009 song by Jordin Sparks from Battlefield
- "Watch You Go", a 2017 song by Tyne-James Organ from Persevere
