= Ukhanov =

Ukhanov is a surname. Notable people with the surname include:

- Evgeny Ukhanov (born 1982), Ukrainian-Australian pianist
- Konstantin Ukhanov (1891–1937), Soviet politician
