= Virgen Maria =

Spanish DJ and producer (born 1990)

- Born: María Forqué; 28 November 1990 (age 35); Vigo, Spain
- Occupations: Singer; DJ; record producer
- Musical career
- Label: Perth

María Forqué (born 28 November 1990), known by the stage name Virgen Maria, is a Spanish DJ, record producer, and artist.

== Discography ==
=== Mixtapes ===
List of mixtapes, with selected details
Title	Details
Devil (with A.K.A.)	Released: 31 March 2020; Label: Perth; Format: digital download, streaming

=== Extended plays ===
List of extended plays, with selected details
Title	Details
G.O.D.	Released: 26 April 2019; Label: Perth; Format: digital download, streaming

=== Singles ===
List of singles as lead artist, showing year released, and originating album
Title	Year	Album
"Virgen Marihuana" (with A.K.A.)	2019	Devil
"Censorship" (with Daniela Blume and A.K.A.)	2020	Devil
"Holi" (with A.K.A. and Kid Lucilfer)	2020	Non-album single
"Miau" (with A.K.A. and Young Darhi)	2021	Non-album single
"Blexatin" (with A.K.A.)	2021	Non-album single
"Fashion" (with A.K.A.)	2021	Non-album single

=== Guest appearances ===
List of non-single guest appearances, showing year released, other performing artists, and originating album
Title	Year	Other artist(s)	Album
"Akatsuki"	2021	Kid Lucilfer; Kaktov; Lucifero 666	Rip
"Only Fans"	2022	Flume	Palaces
