= Startin' Somethin' =

Studio album by Scandal'us
- Released: 7 May 2001
- Recorded: Sydney, 2001
- Genre: Pop
- Label: Song Zu; Festival Mushroom Records
- Producer: Paul Gray

Singles from Scandal'us
- 1. "Me, Myself & I" Released: 16 April 2001; 2. "Make Me Crazy" Released: 2 July 2001

Startin' Somethin' is the only album by Scandal'us, the winners of the second series of the Australian version of the talent program Popstars. It was released on 7 May 2001 and reached number two on the Australian Albums Chart.

== History ==
Startin' Somethin' was recorded in early 2001 while the Popstars program was airing on the Seven Network, and the show included footage of the group in the recording studio, laying down vocals for songs. It was the group's only album before disbanding.

== Track listing ==
Startin' Somethin' track listing
No.	Title	Writer(s)	Length
1.	"Me, Myself & I"	Fred Johansson	3:06
2.	"History"	Janski, Lars Johansen	3:43
3.	"Think Again"	Adam Anders, Pamela Sheyne	3:37
4.	"Make Me Crazy"	Barbara Griffin, Dinesh Wicks, Rupert Wingate	2:57
5.	"Be That Way"	Gary Baker, George Teren, Jerry Williams	3:20
6.	"You Bring Me Love"	Griffin, Wicks, Wingate	2:56
7.	"Startin' Somethin'"	Keith Beauvais	4:12
8.	"High on Your Love"	Waermo	3:38
9.	"Love You To (Be My Baby)"	Paul Gray	3:16
10.	"Hand on Your Heart"	Jon Albrink, James Day, James Gately	3:14
11.	"I'm Not Gonna Cry (Na Na Na)"	John Keller, Gordon Pogoda	3:15
12.	"Now That You're Gone"	King, Lehtonen	3:32

== Charts ==
=== Weekly charts ===
Chart (2001)	Peak position
Australian Albums (ARIA)	2

=== Year-end charts ===
Chart (2001)	Position
Australian Albums (ARIA)	83

== Certification ==
Region	Certification	Certified units/sales
Australia (ARIA)	Platinum	70,000^{^}
^{^} Shipments figures based on certification alone.
