= December (Reigan Derry EP) =

EP by Reigan Derry
- Released: 11 December 2015
- Recorded: 2015
- Genre: Christmas music
- Label: Sony Music Australia

Reigan Derry chronology
All of the Pieces (2014)	December (2015)

December is the second extended play (EP) by Australian singer and songwriter Reigan Derry. The EP was released through Sony Music Australia on 11 December 2015. The four-track EP contains reworked versions of classic Christmas Carols all recorded live and unrehearsed.

In a statement, Derry said "The songs I’ve chosen to cover are all between 100-200 years old. I wanted to pay respect to the original songs by keeping the melodies and lyrics the same but changing the structure, tempo and chords." adding "My family are quite festive. We play Christmas music from 1 December until Boxing Day. I have so much Christmas music on my iTunes but I didn’t have any of the timeless carols! I wanted to open these songs up and share some of my favourites."

== Release and promotion ==
On 3 December 2015, Derry announced the release of her "special project" via a video on her Twitter.

The EP was released digitally on 11 December 2015.

Derry performed "Grace" on The Morning Show on 11 December 2015.

== Review ==
Sounds of Oz said; "This isn’t the Christmas EP that you put on if you want a big family sing-a-long. It’s delicate and introspective. It’s for the quiet moments of reflection that often come at this time of year, as we face saying goodbye to one year and hello to the possibilities of the next. Reigan’s taken the bare bones of Christmas carols and traditional songs of worship and reinterpreted them beautifully, giving them new names and changing a word here or there to make them more modern. Her intimate take on “Amazing Grace,” simply called “Grace” is truly stunning. “We Three Kings” becomes “Star of Wonder,” a haunting, ethereal number. I must admit, I'm not familiar with the Lutheran carol “O Come O Come Emmanuel,” but the Middle Eastern vibe of her version, called “Rejoice,” is so musically interesting and moving. “Holly,” a version of “Deck the Halls,” is December's lightest moment. It brings the celebratory feel that most of us associate with Christmas to the EP. With her strumming her acoustic guitar and friends lending their vocals to the chorus, it feels like a family jam at Reigan's house. December isn't your traditional Christmas recording, but I think that's a good thing. There are so many Christmas recordings delivered schmaltz and sentimentality if that's what you want. This is a recording that showcases a real artist delivering so much more than predictable Christmas covers."

== Track listing ==
No.	Title	Writer(s)	Length
1.	"Grace" (interpretation of "Amazing Grace")	John Newton	2:46
2.	"Star of Wonder" (interpretation of "We Three Kings")	John Henry Hopkins, Jr.	2:28
3.	"Rejoyce" (interpretation of "O come, O come, Emmanuel")		3:06
4.	"Holly" (interpretation of "Deck the Halls")		4:00

== Release history ==
Region	Date	Format	Label	Catalogue
Australia	11 December 2015	digital download	Sony Music Australia	
