= Things Don't Always Go the Way You Plan =

2023 album by Flume

Mixtape by Flume
- Released: 8 February 2023
- Genre: Electronic
- Length: 34:54
- Label: Future Classic; Transgressive
- Producer: Flume

Flume chronology
Palaces (2022)	Things Don't Always Go the Way You Plan (2023)	Arrived Anxious, Left Bored (2023)

Things Don't Always Go the Way You Plan is the second mixtape by Australian electronic musician Flume, released on 8 February 2023 through Future Classic. The mixtape follows the release of Palaces in 2022. It includes collaborations with Injury Reserve, Isabella Manfredi and Panda Bear.

The mixtape consists of 10 previously unreleased tracks dating from 2012 to 2021.

== Background and recording ==
In July 2022, following the release of Flume's previous album, Palaces, he told NME that he had "loads of demos" that totaled "a full album's worth of house music" that he intended on finishing. On 8 November 2022, Flume released a previously unreleased demo from 2014 titled Slugger 1.4 [2014 Export.WAV] to mark 10 years since the release of his 2012 self-titled debut album. In response to positive reception from the track, Flume teased further unreleased demo track releases two days later. In January 2023, he teased that there was "new music coming soon" on social media.

Along with the release of the mixtape on 8 February 2023, Flume explained the background of the project on his Instagram: "It’s been ten years since my first record came out, since then I’ve wrote a lot a lot music and not all of it has seen the light of day. After seeing the reaction to Slugger 1.4 and how much love it got, I figured it would be fun to release more of these forgotten ideas I from my old laptops. The whole process has been quite cathartic."

== Release and promotion ==
Flume teased new music in late January and early February 2023. On 7 February, he posted "10am PT, Wednesday" (8 February) on social media, along with artwork of a computer desktop with the text "Things Don't Always Go The Way You Plan" in the menu bar, later turning out to be the official cover art and title. On 8 February, it was revealed to be a 10-track mixtape of previously unreleased songs and was released on the same day.

== Track listing ==
All tracks are produced by Flume.

Things Don't Always Go the Way You Plan track listing
No.	Title	Writer(s)	Length
1.	"Counting Sheep (V2) [2018 Export Wav]" (featuring Injury Reserve)	Harley Streten; Injury Reserve	2:26
2.	"Nice 2 Know U 1.5.3 [2020 Export Wav]"	Streten	2:15
3.	"Why 1.3 [2012 Export Wav]"	Streten	4:53
4.	"Rhinestone 1.7.2 [2018 Export Wav]" (with Isabella Manfredi)	Streten; Isabella Manfredi	3:54
5.	"Dream 1.2.2 [2016 Export Wav]"	Streten	3:33
6.	"Beat 58 1.1 [2020 Export Wav]"	Streten	2:13
7.	"Close 1.2 [2016 Export Wav]"	Streten	3:12
8.	"One Step Closer 1.4 [2021 Export Wav]" (featuring Panda Bear)	Streten; Noah Benjamin Lennox	3:17
9.	"Spoke 2 Aliens Finally 1.3 [2020 Export Wav]"	Streten	4:41
10.	"Things Don't Always Go the Way You Plan 1.2 [2020 Export Wav]"	Streten	4:30
Total length:			34:54

== Charts ==
Chart performance for Things Don't Always Go the Way You Plan
Chart (2023)	Peak position
Australian Albums (ARIA)	94
Belgian Albums (Ultratop Flanders)	193
