= Closure (Scarlett Belle song) =

Single by Scarlett Belle
- B-side: "Girl That Weeps"
- Released: 4 June 2010
- Genre: Electropop
- Length: 3:35 (radio edit)
- Label: Young & Vicious; Sony
- Songwriters: Reigan Derry; Rudy Sandapa; Tamara Jaber
- Producer: Rudy Sandapa

Scarlett Belle singles chronology
"Closure" (2010)	"Freak Tonight" (2010)

Music video
- "Closure" on YouTube

"Closure" is the debut single by Australian pop duo Scarlett Belle. It was written by Reigan Derry, Rudy Sandapa and Tamara Jaber, and produced by Sandapa. The song was released physically on 4 June 2010 and digitally on 18 June 2010. Upon its release, "Closure" peaked at number 38 on the ARIA Singles Chart.

== Production and release ==
"Closure" was written by Reigan Derry, Rudy Sandapa and Tamara Jaber, and produced by Sandapa. It was also recorded by Sandapa and engineered by Carlos Oyanedel. Phil Tan mixed the track and the mastering was done by Toby Learmont and Tom Coyne. The physical edition of "Closure" was released on 4 June 2010, featuring a Static Revenger remix of "Closure" and the B-side track "Girl That Weeps". The song was later released as a digital extended play (EP) on 18 June 2010. For the week commencing 28 June 2010, "Closure" debuted and peaked at number 38 on the ARIA Singles Chart. It only spent a total of three weeks in the top fifty.

== Personnel ==
- Vocals – Scarlett Belle
- Songwriting – Reigan Derry, Rudy Sandapa, Tamara Jaber
- Production – Rudy Sandapa
- Engineering – Carlos Oyanedel
- Recording – Rudy Sandapa
- Mixing – Phil Tan
- Mastering – Toby Learmont, Tom Coyne

== Track listing ==
- Digital EP
1. "Closure" (Radio Edit) – 3:35
2. "Closure" (Static Revenger Remix) – 5:08
3. "Girl That Weeps" – 3:21
4. "Closure" (Chico Esteban Radio Edit) – 2:46
5. "Closure" (Chico Esteban Extended Remix) – 6:24
- CD single
1. "Closure" (Radio Edit) – 3:35
2. "Closure" (Static Revenger Remix) – 5:08
3. "Girl That Weeps" – 3:21

== Charts ==
Chart (2010)	Peak position
Australia (ARIA)	38

== Release history ==
Region	Date	Format	Label
Australia	4 June 2010	CD	Young & Vicious; Sony Music Australia
Australia	18 June 2010	Digital download	Young & Vicious; Sony Music Australia
