= Say Nothing (Flume song) =

Single by Flume featuring May-a

from the album Palaces
- Written: 2020
- Released: 2 February 2022
- Recorded: 2021
- Length: 3:52
- Label: Future Classic
- Songwriters: Harley Streten; Sarah Aarons
- Producer: Flume

Flume singles chronology
"The Difference" (2020)	"Say Nothing" (2022)	"Sirens" (2022)

May-a singles chronology
"Junk Truck Head Fuck" (2021)	"Say Nothing" (2022)

Music video
- "Say Nothing" on YouTube

"Say Nothing" is a song by Australian electronic musician and producer Flume featuring Australian singer May-a, released through Future Classic on 2 February 2022 as the lead single from his third studio album Palaces (2022). The song was voted into first place on the Triple J Hottest 100 of 2022.

At the 2022 ARIA Music Awards, the song was nominated for Best Pop Release, Best Video and Song of the Year.

At the 2022 J Awards, the song's video was nominated for Australian Video of the Year.

At the APRA Music Awards of 2023, the song won Song of the Year and was also nominated for Most Performed Dance/ Electronic Work of the Year.

At the AIR Awards of 2023, the song was nominated for Best Independent Dance, Electronica or Club Single.

== Background ==
In early January 2022 Flume began teasing the release of new music. He shared a short clip titled "2022" on YouTube on 2 January, which featured a compilation of several forthcoming songs. On 28 January 2022 he announced on social media that he would release a collaboration with Australian indie pop singer May-a on 2 February 2022, alongside a snippet from an accompanying music video. Following the release, "Say Nothing" was confirmed as the lead single from his upcoming third studio album Palaces (2022). According to Flume, the song was written "midway through 2020" and recorded in "early 2021". He explained that he was "really excited about the initial idea but it was only once I got back to Australia in early 2021 and linked up in the studio with May-a that the song really came to life". In an interview with Triple J, he went on to praise her "beautiful voice". May-a described working with the producer as "a really incredible experience", adding that "it's unbelievable to be in a position to create music with someone I look up to and can learn so much from". She further expressed admiration for his "creative process" and shared her excitement for the release of the song.

== Music video ==
The music video, directed by Michael Hili, was released on 3 February 2022. Visuals were described as "surreal" with the artists appearing in motorbike suits next to exotic birds and silicon burger buns, among other things. It also features shots of Flume "sporting bleach-blonde hair" and May-a being buried in black sand.

== Commercial performance ==
In Australia, "Say Nothing" debuted at number 16 on the ARIA Singles Chart on the chart dated 14 February 2022.

== Charts ==
=== Weekly charts ===
Weekly chart performance for "Say Nothing"
Chart (2022–2023)	Peak position
Australia (ARIA)	4
New Zealand Hot Singles (RMNZ)	5
US Hot Dance/Electronic Songs (Billboard)	12

=== Year-end charts ===
Year-end chart performance for "Say Nothing"
Chart (2022)	Position
Australia (ARIA)	96
US Hot Dance/Electronic Songs (Billboard)	80

== Certifications ==
Certifications for "Say Nothing"
Region	Certification	Certified units/sales
Australia (ARIA)	2× Platinum	140,000^{‡}
New Zealand (RMNZ)	Gold	15,000^{‡}
^{‡} Sales+streaming figures based on certification alone.
