= Arrived Anxious, Left Bored =

2023 mixtape album by Flume

Mixtape by Flume
- Released: 3 May 2023
- Genre: Electronic
- Length: 37:52
- Label: Future Classic; Transgressive
- Producer: Flume

Flume chronology
Things Don't Always Go the Way You Plan (2023)	Arrived Anxious, Left Bored (2023)	We Live in a Society (2025)

Arrived Anxious, Left Bored is the third mixtape by Australian electronic musician Flume, released on 3 May 2023 through Future Classic. The mixtape follows the release of Things Don't Always Go the Way You Plan just three months prior in February 2023. It includes collaborations with Jim-E Stack and Emile Haynie.

The mixtape consists of 10 previously unreleased tracks dating from 2015 to 2021.

== Background and recording ==
This is the second mixtape of previously unreleased material, following Things Don't Always Go the Way You Plan in February 2023. Speaking about the new release, Flume has said in a statement that "this and the first Things Don't... drop are a bunch of songs that I always loved that didn't fit on a previous record. It's cathartic, it feels really nice to clean the slate and make way for what's next." This mixtape also marks the first time where Flume recorded his own vocals, in the track "All There 1.9 [2019 Export.WAV]".

== Release and promotion ==
In an interview with Triple J in April 2023, Flume revealed that he would release ten more previously unreleased tracks similarly to Things Don't Always Go the Way You Plan. On 1 May 2023, Flume teased the release of the mixtape album in the alt text on a Twitter post with the text, "aalb 3/5". It was also reported that there were posters that read "May 3rd, 2pm PST" in some cities worldwide. The following day, he confirmed that new songs were scheduled for release on 3 May on social media.

== Track listing ==
All tracks are produced by Flume.

Arrived Anxious, Left Bored track listing
No.	Title	Writer(s)	Length
1.	"SKY SKY 1.3 [2016 Export.WAV]"	Harley Streten; Sarah Aarons	2:44
2.	"Chalk 1.3.3 [2017 Export.WAV]" (featuring Jim-E Stack)	Streten; James Harmon Stack	3:32
3.	"All There 1.9 [2019 Export.WAV]"	Streten	3:04
4.	"Road to Japan [2017 Export.WAV]"	Streten	1:16
5.	"Jerry 1.6 [2017 Export.WAV]"	Streten	6:04
6.	"n1cevib3 1.3 [2015 Export.WAV]"	Streten	3:29
7.	"Arrived Anxious, Left Bored 1.4 [2020 Export.WAV]"	Streten	6:51
8.	"Habibi [2019 Export.WAV]" (featuring Emile Haynie)	Streten; Emile Haynie	2:02
9.	"Miss U [2020 Export.WAV]"	Streten	3:59
10.	"No Other 1.2.2 [2021 Export.WAV]"	Streten	4:47
Total length:			37:52
