= Scarlett Belle =

Australian musical duo

- Origin: Sydney
- Genre: Pop
- Instrument: Vocals
- Years active: 2007–2011
- Labels: Def Jam Recordings; Young & Vicious·/ Sony
- Past members: Tamara Jaber; Reigan Derry; Hayley Aitken
- Website: scarlettbelle.com.au

Scarlett Belle was an Australian pop duo formed in 2007, that initially consisted of Tamara Jaber, Reigan Derry and Hayley Aitken. Aitken left the group in 2008, leaving them as a duo. Scarlett Belle's debut single "Closure" was released in June 2010, and peaked in the top forty on the ARIA Singles Chart. Their second single "Freak Tonight" became a top thirty hit. In 2011, Scarlett Belle disbanded to pursue their solo careers.

== History ==
Formed in 2007, Scarlett Belle were originally a trio that consisted of Jaber, Derry and Aitken. Radio presenter Kyle Sandilands, who was Jaber's manager at the time, helped in negotiating a record deal with US label Def Jam Recordings, which signed the group in 2007. After signing with Def Jam, Scarlett Belle were based between Los Angeles and Sydney and began to work on their debut album with Ne-Yo, Snoop Dogg, JR Rotem, Nate Dogg and StarGate, as well as Australian producers Rudy Sandapa and Israel Cruz. However, in 2008, Scarlett Belle were dropped from the label and Aitken left the group, leaving Derry and Jaber as a duo.

Scarlett Belle later signed with Sony Music Australia, and released their debut single "Closure" in June 2010. The song served as the lead single from their self-titled debut album, which was originally scheduled for release on 3 September 2010, but changes in creative decisions led to the album being delayed. Upon its release, "Closure" peaked at number 38 on the ARIA Singles Chart. Scarlett Belle released their second single in August 2010, a cover of Cruz's 2009 song "Freak Tonight". Featuring guest vocal appearances from Cruz and rapper Miracle, the song peaked at number 29 on the ARIA Singles Chart. "Lover Boy" was released as their third and final single on 26 November 2010, but failed to impact the charts.

In May 2011, Jaber announced in an interview with Australia's OK! magazine that Scarlett Belle had disbanded, and that she would be pursuing a solo career in the United States and the Middle East. Jaber's manager, Mark Byrne, said there was no rift between Jaber and Derry, stating "they just wanted to go their separate ways" to "pursue their own careers".

== Members ==
- Tamara Jaber
- Reigan Derry
- Hayley Aitken

== Discography ==
=== Singles ===
List of singles, with selected chart positions
| Title | Year | Peak chart positions |
| Title | Year | AUS |
|---|---|---|
| "Closure" | 2010 | 38 |
| "Freak Tonight" (featuring Israel and Miracle) | 2010 | 29 |
| "Lover Boy" | 2010 | — |
"—" denotes a single that did not chart.

=== Music videos ===
List of music videos
| Title | Year | Director(s) |
|---|---|---|
| "Closure" | 2010 | Dan Reisinger |
| "Freak Tonight" | 2010 | Simon Smith |
| "Lover Boy" | 2010 | |
