= Palaces (album) =

2022 album by Flume

Studio album by Flume
- Released: 20 May 2022
- Genre: Electronic
- Length: 46:15
- Label: Future Classic
- Producers: Flume; Quiet Bison; Danny L Harle; Clams Casino

Flume chronology
Quits (2019)	Palaces (2022)	Things Don't Always Go the Way You Plan (2023)

Singles from Palaces
- 1. "Say Nothing" Released: 2 February 2022; 2. "Sirens" Released: 30 March 2022; 3. "Escape" / "Palaces" Released: 24 April 2022; 4. "Hollow" Released: 18 May 2022

Palaces is the third studio album by Australian electronic musician Flume, released on 20 May 2022 through Future Classic. It includes collaborations with Oklou, May-a, Quiet Bison, Kučka, Laurel, Virgen María, Emma Louise, Caroline Polachek and Damon Albarn. The album was announced alongside the release of lead single "Say Nothing", featuring May-a.

At the 2022 ARIA Music Awards, the album earned Flume a nomination for Best Solo Artist and was nominated for Best Dance/Electronic Release, Best Cover Art, Best Produced Album and Best Mixed Album.

The album was nominated for Australian Album of the Year at the 2022 J Awards.

== Background and recording ==
After returning to Australia following the end of his world tour in support of Skin (2016) and Hi This Is Flume (2019), Flume moved to a coastal town in the Northern Rivers area of New South Wales, where he says he found "inspiration from the flora and fauna surrounding him". He also made field recordings of birds, which are used throughout the album. According to Flume, the album was also influenced by late English producer Sophie.

== Release and promotion ==
Flume announced the album and its track listing on 2 February 2022, also releasing the song "Say Nothing" featuring May-a as the album's lead single and its music video the same day. The video contains similar visuals to those Flume uploaded on his NFT website throughout 2021. Flume said the track is about "feelings of post relationship clarity" and was written "midway through 2020 while the pandemic was still pretty new", although it was finished in early 2021. "Sirens" featuring American singer Caroline Polachek, was released as the second single on 30 March 2022. "Escape", co-produced by Quiet Bison and featuring Australian singer Kučka, and "Palaces" featuring British singer Damon Albarn, were released as a double single on 24 April 2022. "Hollow" featuring Australian singer Emma Louise was released on 18 May 2022 as the fourth single.

== Critical reception ==
Professional ratings
Aggregate scores
Source	Rating
Metacritic	72/100
Review scores
Source	Rating
Clash	7/10
DIY	4/5 stars
The Line of Best Fit	6/10
musicOMH	3/5 stars
NME	4/5 stars
Pitchfork	6.5/10

At Metacritic, which assigns a normalised rating out of 100 to reviews from professional publications, the album received an average score of 72, based on 6 reviews.

== Track listing ==
All tracks produced by Flume, except where noted.

Standard edition
No.	Title	Writer(s)	Producer(s)	Length
1.	"Highest Building" (featuring Oklou)	Harley Streten; Marylou Mayniel; Daniel Eisner Harle; Casey Manierka	Flume; Danny L Harle	3:36
2.	"Say Nothing" (featuring May-a)	Streten; Sarah Aarons		3:52
3.	"DHLC"	Streten		2:18
4.	"Escape" (with Quiet Bison featuring Kučka)	Streten; Quinn Browning; Laura Jane Lowther	Flume; Quiet Bison	4:02
5.	"I Can't Tell" (featuring Laurel)	Streten; Lennon Stella; Gamal Lewis; Michael Sonier; Martin McKinney		3:51
6.	"Get U"	Streten		4:14
7.	"Jasper's Song"	Streten; Jasper Harris		3:01
8.	"Only Fans" (featuring Virgen María)	Streten; María Forqué		2:24
9.	"Hollow" (featuring Emma Louise)	Streten; Browning; Emma Louise	Flume; Quiet Bison	3:53
10.	"Love Light"	Streten		2:40
11.	"Sirens" (featuring Caroline Polachek)	Streten; Caroline Polachek; Harle	Flume; Harle	3:58
12.	"Go"	Streten	Flume; Clams Casino	3:35
13.	"Palaces" (featuring Damon Albarn)	Streten; Keaton Henson; Michael Volpe; Damon Albarn	Flume; Clams Casino	4:51
Total length:				46:15

Deluxe edition
No.	Title	Writer(s)	Length
14.	"Miss U"	Streten	4:09
15.	"Jasper's Song (Version 1)"	Streten; Harris	5:47
Total length:			56:11

== Charts ==
Chart performance for Palaces
Chart (2022)	Peak position
Australian Albums (ARIA)	3
Belgian Albums (Ultratop Flanders)	60
Belgian Albums (Ultratop Wallonia)	139
New Zealand Albums (RMNZ)	18
Scottish Albums (Official Charts)	56
Swiss Albums (Schweizer Hitparade)	74
UK Dance Albums (Official Charts)	6
UK Album Downloads (Official Charts)	80
UK Independent Albums (Official Charts)	9
US Billboard 200	162
US Independent Albums (Billboard)	21
US Top Dance Albums (Billboard)	1
