= Isabella Manfredi =

Australian rock musician

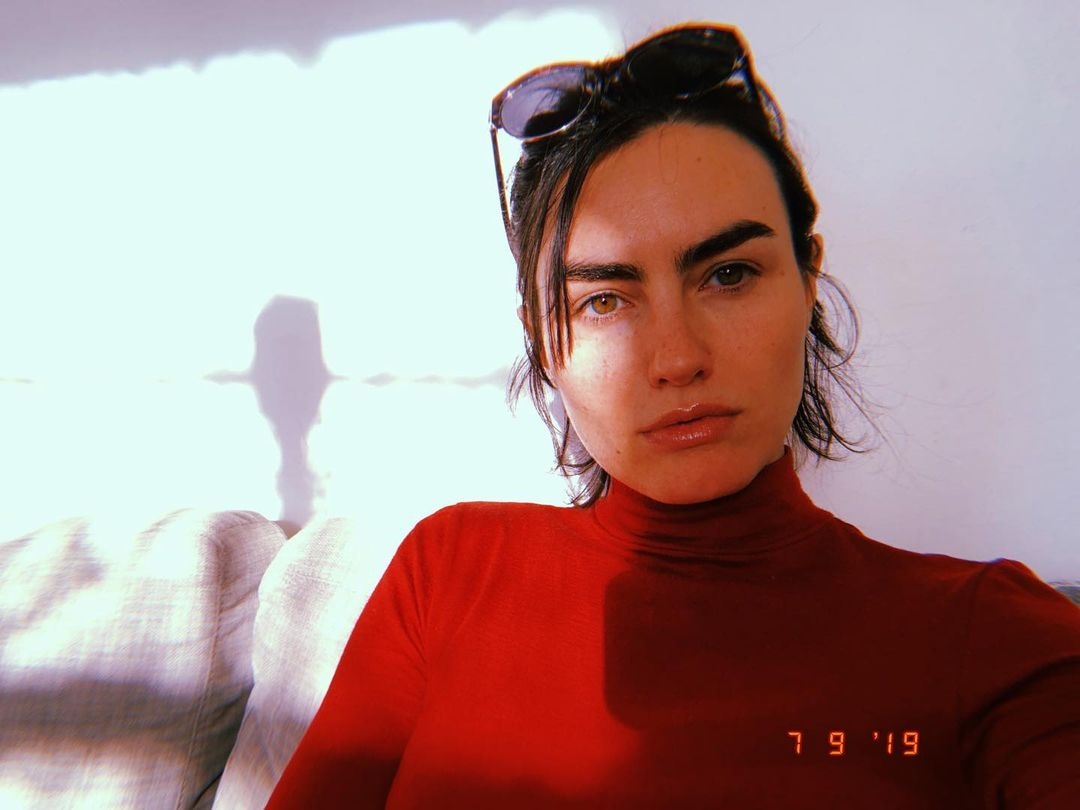
- Manfredi in 2020

Background information
- Born: Isabella Rubi Manfredi; 1987 (age 38–39)
- Origin: Sydney, New South Wales, Australia
- Genres: Pop; indie rock; indie pop
- Occupations: Singer; songwriter; musician; activist
- Years active: 2010–present
- Labels: Island Australia; Universal Australia
- Website: www.isabellamanfredi.co

Isabella Rubi "Izzi" Manfredi (born 1987) is an Australian pop rock singer, songwriter and activist from Sydney, New South Wales. Manfredi is best known as the former lead vocalist of indie rock band the Preatures. Her debut single, "Jealousy", was released on 26 May 2021, and her debut album "izzi" was released in 2022.

== Early life ==
Isabella Rubi Manfredi was born in 1987 to parents Julie Manfredi and Italian-Australian celebrity chef Stefano Manfredi. She was raised in Sydney, New South Wales.

== Career ==
=== 2010–present: The Preatures ===
Manfredi met Thomas Champion and Jack Moffitt at the Australian Institute of Music in 2008. They formed a band together and, in 2010, added Luke Davison and Gideon Bensen, naming themselves The Preachers, a nod to the history of bands in Australia with pseudo religious names, like The Divinyls, The Angels, The Saints, The Choirboys, and The Church.

In 2012, they changed the spelling of their name to the Preatures to avoid legal complications with other bands with similar names, signed with Mercury Records and released the EP Shaking Hands. The EP featured the single "Take a Card", written by Manfredi with Bensen on lead vocals. It was featured on Triple J Unearthed.

In 2013, they released a second EP, Is This How You Feel?, which was preceded by two singles, "Is This How You Feel?" and "Manic Baby". "Is This How You Feel?" attracted considerable success, winning the $50,000 Vanda & Young Global Songwriting Competition, receiving an ARIA Award nomination for Best Pop Release and being voted ninth in Triple J's Hottest 100 of 2013.

Blue Planet Eyes, their debut studio album, was released on 30 September 2014. Blue Planet Eyes peaked at number 4 on the ARIA Albums Chart. At the 2015 ARIA Music Awards, the group received nominations in three categories.

Their second and final studio album, Girlhood, was released on 11 August 2017 via Island Records Australia. Girlhood received an ARIA Award nomination for Best Rock Album.

Following a prolonged period of inactivity, Manfredi confirmed the Preatures' end in 2021. Her relationship with Moffitt had ended some time before, and she was expecting a baby with her partner Rupert. She had done some side projects collaborating with Flume before, but wanted to pursue a solo career, saying it would be better for the band. She spoke at some length about the break-up of the band and her personal relationships with Rolling Stone Australia in 2021.

On 10 December 2024, the band reunited for a one-off performance at Sydney's Lansdowne Hotel, where they had played live for the first time ever, to commemorate their tenth anniversary, and reissued Blue Planet Eyes on vinyl to celebrate the occasion.

=== 2019–present: Debut studio album izzi ===
On 3 December 2019, Manfredi was announced as the recipient of the Mushroom Music Publishing Recording Grant, winning $10,000 towards the recording of her debut album. Manfredi is the seventh artist to take out the grant, following previous recipients such as Hatchie, D.D Dumbo and Rolling Blackouts Coastal Fever. On 26 May 2021, Manfredi released her debut solo single "Jealousy"

In September 2022, Manfredi released her debut solo album "izzi". The album was recorded during the covid lockdown period in Australia, a remote co-production between Jonathan Wilson, Chris Collins and Manfredi. It featured prominent musicians Stella Mozgawa, Touch Sensitive, Kirin J Callinan and Drew Erickson.

In 2023, Manfredi dueted with Tina Arena on the reboot of RockWiz, released "Rhinestone 1.7.2" with Flume which remained the most played song on Triple J for 6 weeks. She also supported Marlon Williams, and toured her debut album. In May, Manfredi performed "Rhinestone" with Flume at the 10 years of Flume concert at the Kia Forum in Los Angeles, marking her third collaboration with Streten in 10 years.

== Personal life ==
On 27 January 2021, Manfredi revealed her pregnancy and engagement to musician and creative technologist Rupert Parry.

Their daughter, Mina Manfredi, was born in June 2021. Rupert and Isabella married in 2023, with Rupert taking the Manfredi surname. They now live in San Francisco.

Manfredi is a supporter of the Keep Sydney Open campaign.

== Discography ==
=== Studio albums ===
List of studio albums, with release date and label shown
Title	Details
izzi	Released: 2 September 2022; Label: Island Records (4532746); Formats: CD, LP, Digital download, streaming

=== Soundtrack albums ===
List of soundtrack albums, with release date and label shown
Title	Details
Plan B	Released: 28 May 2021; Label: American High; Formats: Digital download, streaming

=== Live albums ===
List of live albums, with release date and label shown
Title	Live album details
Live at Hubert	Released: 21 May 2021; Label: Universal Australia; Formats: Digital download, streaming

=== Singles ===
==== As lead artist ====
List of singles, with year released and album name shown
Title	Year	Album
"Forever Now" (with Dan Sultan)	2017	Non-album single
"Jealousy"	2021	TBA
"One Hit Wonder"	2021	TBA
"Naive" (with Pricie)	2022	izzi

=== Guest appearances ===
List of guest appearances, with lead artist(s), year released, and album name shown
Title	Year	Album
"The Greatest View" (Flume featuring Isabella Manfredi)	2012	Flume
"Endless" (Donny Benét featuring Isabella Manfredi)	2014	Weekend at Donny's
"Jealousy" (San Cisco featuring Isabella Manfredi)	2014	Gracetown
"Trust" (Flume featuring Isabella Manfredi)	2016	Skin Companion EP 1
"Never Tear Us Apart" (with Jon Stevens and Andrew Farriss)	2017	Music from the Home Front
"Rhinestone 1.7.2 (2018 Export Wav)" (Flume featuring Isabella Manfredi)	2023	Things Don't Always Go the Way You Plan
"Young Turks" and "The Gypsy and the Bird	2026	My Brilliant Career

== Awards and nominations ==
=== APRA Awards ===
The APRA Awards are presented annually from 1982 by the Australasian Performing Right Association (APRA), "honouring composers and songwriters". They commenced in 1982.

Year	Nominee / work	Award	Result	Ref.
2015	"Somebody's Talking" (Gideon Bensen, Thomas Champion, Luke Davison, Isabella Manfredi, Jack Mofitt)	Song of the Year	Shortlisted	
2015	The Preatures (Gideon Bensen, Thomas Champion, Luke Davison, Isabella Manfredi, Jack Mofitt)	Breakthrough Songwriter of the Year	Nominated	

=== Vanda & Young Global Songwriting Competition ===
The Vanda & Young Global Songwriting Competition is an annual competition that "acknowledges great songwriting whilst supporting and raising money for Nordoff-Robbins"; it is coordinated by Albert Music and APRA AMCOS. It commenced in 2009.

Year	Nominee / work	Award	Result	Ref.
2013	Isabella Manfredi for "Is This How You Feel?"	Vanda & Young Global Songwriting Competition	1st	
