= Feels Like Heaven (Reigan Derry song) =

Single by Reigan Derry
- B-side: "Always Know My Truth"
- Released: 4 September 2015
- Genre: Pop
- Length: 3:29
- Label: Sony
- Songwriters: Reigan Derry; Jon Hume; Hayley Warner; Phil Barton

Reigan Derry singles chronology
"All of the Pieces" (2014)	"Feels Like Heaven" (2015)

"Feels Like Heaven" is the second single by Australian singer and songwriter Reigan Derry. It was written by Derry, Jon Hume, Hayley Warner and Phil Barton. The song was released both physically and digitally on 4 September 2015, as the lead single from Derry's upcoming debut studio album. "Feels Like Heaven" is a mid-tempo pop track, which contains elements of indie music and uses synth beats, harmonies and a guitar as its instrumentation. Lyrically, the song talks about the heavenly feeling a person receives from someone they love.

Upon its release, "Feels Like Heaven" received positive reviews from music critics, who complimented the production and Derry's vocal delivery. Some critics also felt that its musical style and Derry's vocals were reminiscent of Florence and the Machine and Sia. The song debuted at number 37 on the ARIA Singles Chart. The accompanying music video was directed by Mitchel Tuul and Hugh Martin, and filmed in Adelaide. It features scenes of Derry singing the song's lyrics and playing the guitar in her bedroom, and hanging out with her love interest at the countryside. Derry promoted "Feels Like Heaven" with live performances and interviews on radio and television programs, as well as instore appearances.

== Background and release ==
In December 2014, Derry released her debut extended play All of the Pieces, which included her debut single of the same name and four cover versions of songs she performed on The X Factor Australia. Following the EP's release, Derry began working on new material with several other songwriters to create the songs which could potentially be included on her upcoming debut studio album. She also went on writing trips to London and Sweden. On 6 August 2015, Derry announced the release of her second single "Feels Like Heaven" via her social media platforms and it became available to pre-order online in both digital and physical formats. On the decision to release "Feels Like Heaven" as her second single, Derry said "it's because of the sound of the song, the power of the song, the pop sensibility versus a bit of acousticness and that singer-songwriter feeling." "Feels Like Heaven" was then released on 4 September as the lead single from her debut studio album. Its physical release includes the B-side track "Always Know My Truth".

== Production and composition ==
"Feels Like Heaven" was written by Derry, Jon Hume, Hayley Warner and Phil Barton. They wrote the song on Hume's farm during the summertime and it took one day to complete. "Feels Like Heaven" is a mid-tempo pop song with elements of indie music. Its instrumentation consists of a guitar, synth beats and harmonies. The Daily Telegraph's Kathy McCabe likened the song's musical style to Florence and the Machine, while Thomasbleach.com felt that its production and Derry's vocal performance was reminiscent of Sia. Lyrically, "Feels Like Heaven" talks about the heavenly feeling you get from someone you love. Derry explained, "Heaven is found in the most basic places and is a celebration of love in its simplest form." According to Snap Cackle Pop, the song starts off with a soft intro, before bursting "into a massive chorus as Derry screams she has found heaven in the most simplest of places". The chorus begins with the lyrics, "Cause it feels like heaven with your hand on my face / Oh it feels like heaven when I'm with you for days" and ends with the line "we found heaven, in this hell of a place".

== Reception ==
"Feels Like Heaven" received positive reviews from music critics. Damian of Auspop named it "a gorgeous, mature pop number" and complimented Derry's "stunning, raspy vocals" in the verses. Shahbaz Malik of Media Hype 101 gave "Feels Like Heaven" four stars out of five and described it as "heavenly divine", further praising the track as a "euphoric bop" that "sounds like a hit". Kathy McCabe of The Daily Telegraph felt that "Feels Like Heaven" sounds like a cross "between the orchestral Florence and the Machine style pop that Australia seemed to feel connected with her [Derry] most strongly and the straight ahead pop that commercial radio prefers to play".

Thomasbleach.com praised Derry for delivering "a powerful and infectious feel good track" that will have listeners "captivated" when the first chorus begins, further adding that the track will make listeners forget about their problems and feel "a pure form of infectious happiness". Chris Jameson of Joy 94.9 named it "a very pretty" song that listeners "will enjoy", while a writer for Snap Cackle Pop called it "mesmerising". For the issue dated 14 September 2015, "Feels Like Heaven" debuted at number 37 on the ARIA Singles Chart. It became Derry's third top-fifty entry on that chart and her eighth top one hundred entry overall. The following week, "Feels Like Heaven" dropped out of the ARIA top one hundred.

== Music video ==
The music video for "Feels Like Heaven" was directed by Mitchel Tuul and Hugh Martin, and filmed in Adelaide in August 2015. Derry's love interest in the video was played by a friend she had not seen in five years. A behind-the-scenes clip of the music video was released on The Daily Telegraph website on 5 September. Derry explained that she wanted the video to be simple so that viewers "would appreciate the simplicity" of the song's lyrics. The official video premiered on The X Factor Australia official Facebook page on 18 September, and was later uploaded to Derry's Vevo channel the following day.

The video begins with scenes of Derry in her bedroom singing the song's lyrics and playing the guitar. It is then intercut with bedroom scenes of Derry and her love interest staring intimately at each other. The video then shows the pair going on a road trip to the countryside. They are later seen hanging out at a nearby field, where Derry is shown resting her head on her lover's shoulder. This is intercut with scenes of Derry singing the song in her car and bedroom, and running on the field. The video then shows Derry back in her bedroom looking directly into the camera and it ends with her laying on her bed.

== Promotion ==
Derry promoted "Feels Like Heaven" on television with live performances on Sunrise (4 September) and The Morning Show (7 September), and an interview on The Daily Edition (4 September). She also performed and signed physical copies of the single for fans during appearances at Bond Café in Sydney (4 September), the Roselands Shopping Centre in Roselands, New South Wales (6 September), and Westfield Carousel in Cannington, Western Australia (13 September). On 11 September, Derry performed "Feels Like Heaven" on Sonshine FM's Live on Drive.

== Track listing ==
- Digital download
1. "Feels Like Heaven" – 3:29
- CD single
1. "Feels Like Heaven" – 3:29
2. "Always Know My Truth"

== Charts ==
Chart (2015)	Peak position
Australia (ARIA)	37

== Release history ==
Region	Date	Format	Label	Catalogue
Australia	4 September 2015	CD; digital download	Sony Music Australia	88875130012
