= Make Me Crazy =

Single by Scandal'us

from the album Startin' Somethin'
- Released: 2 July 2001 (Australia)
- Recorded: Sydney
- Genre: Pop
- Label: Festival Mushroom Records
- Songwriter(s): Griffin, Dinesh Wicks, Wingate
- Producer(s): Michael Szumowski

Scandal'us singles chronology
"Me, Myself & I" (2001)	"Make Me Crazy" (2001)

Audio video
- "Make Me Crazy" on YouTube

"Make Me Crazy" is the second and final single by Scandal'us from their debut album Startin' Somethin'. It did not live up to the success of their debut single, "Me, Myself & I", only managing to debut and peak at No. 30 on the Australian ARIA Charts. This was the last release from the band before they broke up in 2002.

== Track listing ==
Maxi Single

1. "Make Me Crazy" (3:15)
2. "Make Me Crazy" (Crazy Nights Mix) (3:30)
3. "Make Me Crazy" (Wired Meshmix) (3:26)
4. "Make Me Crazy" (KCB Klubbmix) (3:34)
5. "Make Me Crazy" (Karaoke Mix) (3:17)

== Charts ==
Chart (2001)	Peak Position
Australian ARIA Singles Chart	30

Australian ARIA Top 50 Singles Chart
Week	01	02	03	04	05
Position	30	35	39	43	50
