= Me, Myself & I (Scandal'us song) =

2001 single by Scandal'us

Single by Scandal'us

from the album Startin' Somethin'
- Released: 16 April 2001
- Genre: Pop
- Length: 3:10
- Label: Festival Mushroom
- Songwriter: Fred Johansson
- Producers: Craig Porteils; Paul Gray

Scandal'us singles chronology
"Me, Myself & I" (2001)	"Make Me Crazy" (2001)

Audio video
- "Me, Myself & I" on YouTube

"Me, Myself & I" is a song by Australian pop group Scandal'us. It was released as the debut single from their album Startin' Somethin' and reached number one on the Australia ARIA Singles Chart in 2001, staying there for three weeks. It was the country's 15th-most-successful hit of 2001 and received a double-platinum sales certification. At the ARIA Music Awards of 2001, the song won Highest Selling Single.

== Track listings ==
Australian maxi-CD single 1

1. "Me, Myself & I" (single mix) – 3:10
2. "Me, Myself & I" (Funk Corporation remix) – 3:49
3. "Me, Myself & I" (Mayday vs. Cadell – High Energy mix) – 3:32
4. "Me, Myself & I" (karaoke mix) – 3:08

Australian maxi-CD single 2

1. "Me, Myself & I" (single mix) – 3:06
2. "Me, Myself & I" (RnB mix) – 3:22
3. "Me, Myself & I" (Mayday vs. Cadell – High Energy mix) – 3:29
4. "Me, Myself & I" (karaoke mix) – 3:06

== Charts ==
=== Weekly charts ===
Chart (2001)	Peak position
Australia (ARIA)	1

=== Year-end charts ===
Chart (2001)	Position
Australia (ARIA)	15

== Certifications ==
Region	Certification	Certified units/sales
Australia (ARIA)	2× Platinum	140,000^{^}
^{^} Shipments figures based on certification alone.

== In popular culture ==
The original version of this song was recorded by the winners of series one of PopStars in Sweden, Excellence, although it was not released as a single. In 2011, the Excellence version was featured in the gym scene of the film Final Destination 5.
