= Evgeny Ukhanov =

Ukrainian-Australian pianist

Evgeny Ukhanov Євгеній Уханов
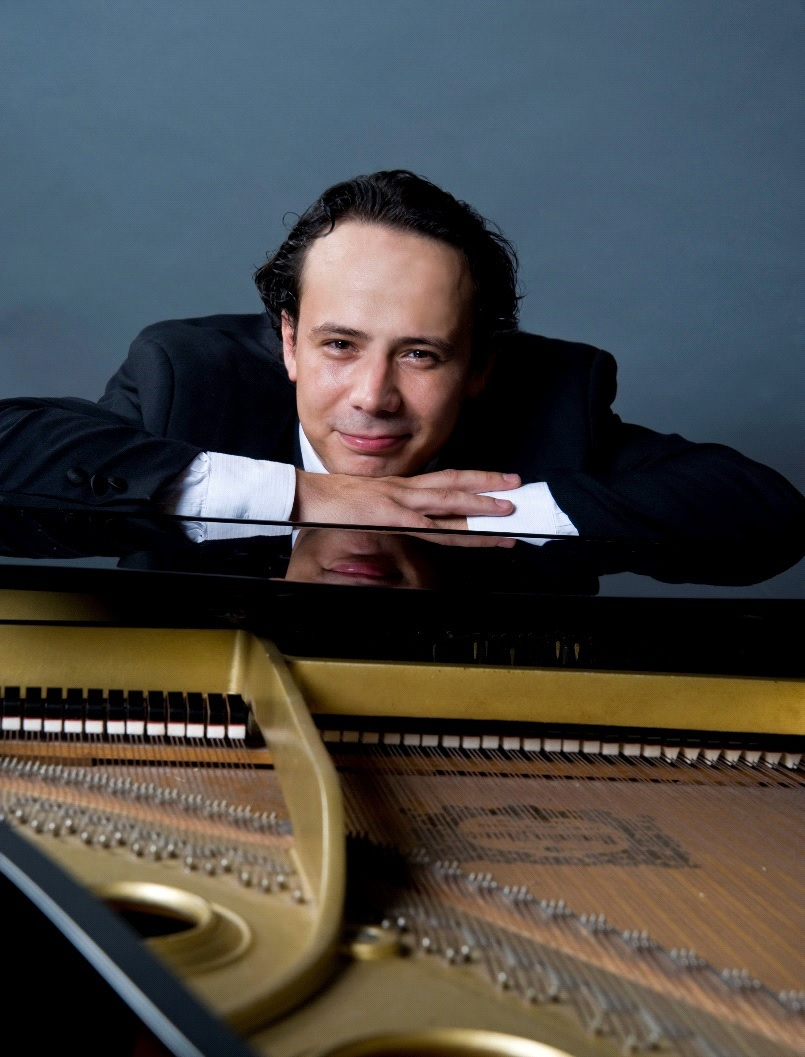

Background information
- Born: May 19, 1982 (age 44); Horlivka, Ukrainian SSR, Soviet Union
- Genres: Classical
- Occupations: Pianist; Teacher
- Instrument: Piano

Evgeny Ukhanov (Note: Ukrainian: Євгеній Уханов, romanized: Yevhenii Ukhanov) (born 19 May 1982) is a Ukrainian-Australian pianist.

Born in Horlivka, Donetsk Oblast, Evgeny began studying music when he was 7 years old and gave his first recital at age of 9.

He attended the Special music school for gifted children in Kharkiv from 1992 until 1997 and earned a Bachelor of Music at the Australian Institute of Music where he studied from 1998 through 2002. He earned a Diploma at the Horowitz International Piano Competition Kiev, Ukraine in 1996 and a Diploma at the International Piano Competition Senigalia, Italy in 1996. In 1998, he received a scholarship from the Australian Institute of Music, from which he graduated in 2002 and was on the list of outstanding graduates of the institute.

In 2000 he won the third prize of the prestigious Sydney International Piano Competition. He was 18 years old, among international contenders in the range of 16–32 years.

He continued to live in Australia and eventually became an Australian citizen in 2004.

He has been working and performing extensively ever since then.

Some of his notable Australian performances include concert series at Government House "Stars of the Future", participation at the world famous series "Proms" concerts, Sergei Rachmaninoff and Sergei Prokofiev Piano Festivals, a festival of F. Chopin.

He has appeared on radio and television - ABC Classic FM, 2MBS FM and TV programme "Rising Stars" in 2002.

Evgeny has performed numerous times as a soloist and a chamber musician in Sydney Opera House, City of Sydney Town Hall, City Recital Hall “Angel Place”. He also performed with orchestras such as Sydney Symphony Orchestra, Sydney Sinfonia Orchestra, Sydney Youth Orchestra, SBS Orchestra and others. He was the official accompanist for the "Master Performers of Australia" competition in Sydney, guest performer at the 5th Yamaha Australia competition for young pianists.

Other notable performances include - the Governor’s Reception for Australia Day (Gershwin “Rhapsody in Blue”), German Prime Minister in Magdeburg, Germany, the Chinese Australian Forum, the Governor of Queensland, Parliament House in Brisbane, Her Excellency the Governor of NSW, Government House in Canberra, the National Gallery Canberra .

Evgeny has also been teaching since the age of 18 and has successfully prepared many students for exams, local competitions and other performances.

International concerts include performances in England, France, Italy, Spain, Germany, Norway, Russia, Japan, USA, Romania.

Piano Concerto #3 d minor. S. Rachmaninov. Evgeny Ukhanov. 4/5
