= Is This How You Feel? =

Single by the Preatures

from the album Is This How You Feel?
- Released: May 2013
- Length: 3:35
- Label: Mosy; Mercury Records
- Songwriter(s): Isabella Manfredi; Jack Moffitt; Thomas Champion; Luke Davison; Gideon Bensen
- Producer(s): Jack Moffitt

The Preatures singles chronology
"Take a Card" (2012)	"Is This How You Feel?" (2013)	"Manic Baby" (2013)

Music video
- "Is This How You Feel?" on YouTube

"Is This How You Feel?" is a song recorded by Australian indie rock band the Preatures, released in May 2013 as the lead single from their second extended play of the same name (2013).

In January 2014, "Is This How You Feel?" was voted number 9 in the Triple J Hottest 100, 2013, and following this result, debuted and peaked at number 46 on the ARIA Singles Chart in February 2014. It was certified platinum in Australia in 2018.

The song won first place at the 2013 Vanda & Young Global Songwriting Competition.

== Reception ==
Sarah Guppy from Tone Deaf called the song a "summery laid-back groove" adding "delightful crisp vocals and transient beats will have you hitting repeat on this funky tune."

Mark Pytlik from Pitchfork said the song "is a clear departure from their early material, showcasing a newfound dedication to rhythm and restraint" concluding saying "'Is This How You Feel?' is a mid-tempo, feel-good, groove-based confection that explodes into one of the year's best choruses."

== Credits and personnel ==
The Preatures

- Isabella Manfredi – lead vocals, writing, keyboards
- Jack Moffitt – guitar, writing
- Thomas Champion – bass guitar, writing
- Luke Davison – drums, writing
- Gideon Bensen – writing, guitar

== Charts ==
Chart performance for "Is This How You Feel?"
Chart (2014)	Peak position
Australia (ARIA)	46

== Certifications ==
Region	Certification	Certified units/sales
Australia (ARIA)	Platinum	70,000^{‡}
^{‡} Sales+streaming figures based on certification alone.
