= The Preatures =

Australian indie rock band

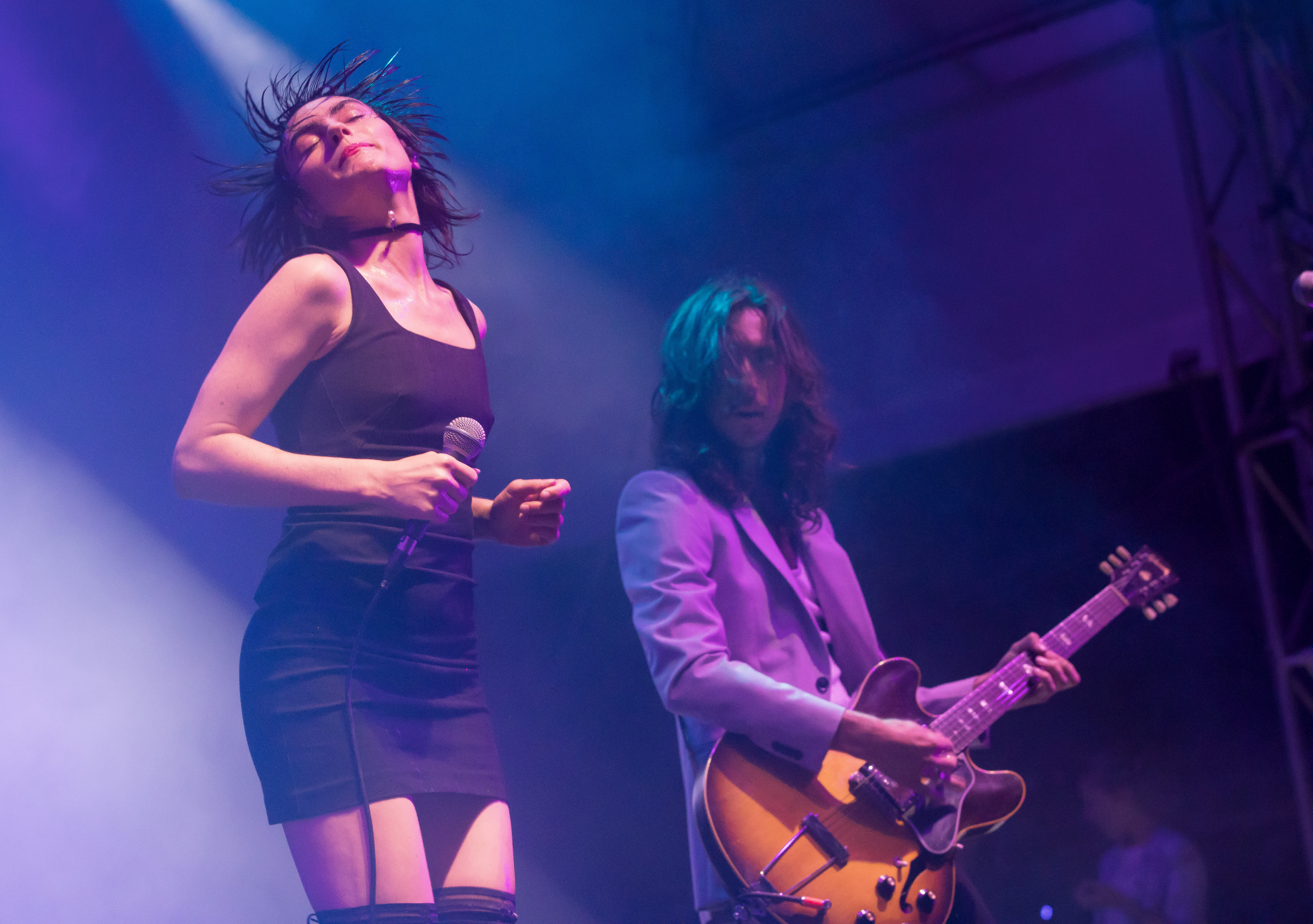
- Isabella Manfredi and Jack Moffitt, 2019

Background information
- Origin: Sydney, Australia
- Genres: Indie rock; indie pop
- Years active: 2010–2021; 2024–2025
- Label: Mercury Records Australia
- Members: Isabella Manfredi; Thomas Champion; Luke Davison; Jack Moffitt; Gideon Bensen
- Website: preatures.com

The Preatures was an Australian indie rock band from Sydney, New South Wales. They formed in 2010 and disbanded in 2021, following the launch of lead vocalist and keyboardist Isabella "Izzi" Manfredi's solo career. The group reunited in December 2024 for a one-off concert to commemorate their tenth anniversary, with a reissue of their 2014 debut album, Blue Planet Eyes. They have continued to tour around Australia in 2025. The band consists of Manfredi, guitarist and vocalist Jack Moffitt, bassist Thomas Champion, and drummer Luke Davison. Vocalist and guitarist Gideon Bensen was a member of the band until 2016. In 2013, the Preatures won the Vanda & Young Global Songwriting Competition with their song "Is This How You Feel?".

== History ==
Thomas Champion and Jack Moffitt were school friends at Newington College, Sydney, and they met Isabella Manfredi at the Australian Institute of Music in 2008. They formed as a trio first, before meeting vocalist and guitarist Gideon Bensen at the Lansdowne Hotel and asking him to write songs for them. In 2010, they met and added Luke Davison, calling themselves the Preachers.

In 2012, they changed the spelling of their name to the Preatures to avoid legal complications with other bands using similar names. They signed with Mercury Records for a five-album contract and recorded their debut EP, Shaking Hands, in Los Angeles. The EP featured the single "Take a Card", written by Manfredi, with Bensen on lead vocals. It was uploaded to Triple J Unearthed.

In 2013, they released their second extended play, Is This How You Feel?, which was preceded by two singles, "Is This How You Feel?" and "Manic Baby". "Is This How You Feel?" had considerable success, winning the $50,000 Vanda & Young Global Songwriting Competition, receiving a nomination for an ARIA Award for Best Pop Release, and being voted ninth in Triple J's Hottest 100 of 2013.

The band's debut studio album, Blue Planet Eyes, was released on 30 September 2014, peaking at No. 4 on the ARIA Albums Chart. At the 2015 ARIA Awards, the group were nominated in three categories.

Bensen left the band on good terms in March 2016. Their second studio album, Girlhood, was released on 11 August 2017 by Island Records. It was nominated for an ARIA Award for Best Rock Album. The single "Yanada" was co-written with Darug musician Jacinta Tobin. Along with the release of the single, the Preatures launched a campaign to help the Australian Institute of Aboriginal and Torres Strait Islander Studies raise money to maintain the documentation of Indigenous languages.

Following a prolonged period of inactivity, Manfredi confirmed the band's breakup in May 2021. The end of her ten-year romantic relationship with Moffitt, along with a record contract they were unhappy with, were the main reasons for the split. Manfredi pursued a solo career, while Davison began playing drums for Australian artists Delta Goodrem and Dean Lewis. Moffitt pursued a career in production as well as playing guitar with Tyne-James Organ. Manfredi spoke at some length about the breakup of the band and her personal relationships with Rolling Stone Australia in 2021.

On 10 December 2024, the band reunited for a one-off performance at Sydney's Lansdowne Hotel, the first venue they had ever played, to commemorate their tenth anniversary, and reissued Blue Planet Eyes on vinyl to celebrate the occasion. Jem Cassar-Daley opened for the band. They have continued to tour into 2025, in commemoration of their debut album, starting on 5 June and finishing on 16 August 2025.

== Discography ==
=== Studio albums ===
Title	Album details	Peak chart positions	Certifications
Title	Album details	AUS	Certifications
Blue Planet Eyes	Released: 30 September 2014; Label: Mosy, Mercury Records (4701511); Formats: CD, LP, digital download, streaming	4	ARIA: Gold
Girlhood	Released: 11 August 2017; Label: Universal Music Australia (5775087); Formats: CD, LP, digital download, streaming	13	

=== Live albums ===
Title	Album details	Peak chart positions
Title	Album details	AUS
Blue Planet Eyes... Live!	Released: 12 December 2025; Label: Impressed Recordings (IMP213B); Formats: 2×LP	84

=== EPs ===
Title	EP details
Shaking Hands	Released: 12 October 2012; Label: Mosy, Mercury Records (3717118); Formats: CD, digital download
Is This How You Feel?	Released: 9 August 2013; Label: Mosy, Mercury Records (3747799); Formats: CD, digital download

=== Singles ===
Title	Year	Peak chart positions	Certifications	Album
Title	Year	AUS	Certifications	Album
"Take a Card"	2012	—		Shaking Hands
"Young Brave Me"	2012	—		Shaking Hands
"Is This How You Feel?"	2013	46	ARIA: Platinum	Is This How You Feel?
"Manic Baby"	2013	—		Is This How You Feel?
"Better Than It Ever Could Be"	2014	—		Non-album single
"Two Tone Melody"	2014	—		Blue Planet Eyes
"Somebody's Talking"	2014	79		Blue Planet Eyes
"Cruel"	2015	—		Blue Planet Eyes
"I Know a Girl"	2016	—		Non-album single
"Girlhood"	2017	—		Girlhood
"Yanada"	2017	—		Girlhood
"Magick"	2018	—		Girlhood

== Awards and nominations ==
=== APRA Awards ===
The APRA Awards are presented annually from 1982 by the Australasian Performing Right Association (APRA), "honouring composers and songwriters". They commenced in 1982.

Year	Nominee / work	Award	Result	Ref.
2014	"Is This How You Feel" (Thomas Champion, Luke Davison, Isabella Manfredi, Jack Mofitt)	Song of the Year	Nominated	
2015	"Somebody's Talking" (Gideon Bensen, Thomas Champion, Luke Davison, Isabella Manfredi, Jack Mofitt)	Song of the Year	Shortlisted	
2015	The Preatures (Gideon Bensen, Thomas Champion, Luke Davison, Isabella Manfredi, Jack Mofitt)	Breakthrough Songwriter of the Year	Nominated	

=== ARIA Music Awards ===
The ARIA Music Awards is an annual awards ceremony that recognises excellence, innovation, and achievement across all genres of Australian music.

Year	Nominee / work	Award	Result	Ref.
2013	Is This How You Feel?	Best Pop Release	Nominated	
2014	Two Tone Medley Tour	Best Australian Live Act	Nominated	
2015	Blue Planet Eyes	Best Group	Nominated	
2015	Blue Planet Eyes	Best Rock Album	Nominated	
2015	The Cruel Tour	Best Australian Live Act	Nominated	
2017	Girlhood	Best Rock Album	Nominated	

=== J Awards ===
The J Awards are an annual series of Australian music awards that were established by the Australian Broadcasting Corporation's youth-focused radio station Triple J. They commenced in 2005.

Year	Nominee / work	Award	Result	Ref.
2014	Blue Planet Eyes	Australian Album of the Year	Nominated	

=== National Live Music Awards ===
The National Live Music Awards (NLMAs) are a broad recognition of Australia's diverse live industry, celebrating the success of the Australian live scene. The awards commenced in 2016.

Year	Nominee / work	Award	Result	Ref.
2018	The Preatures	Live Pop Act of the Year	Nominated	

=== Vanda & Young Global Songwriting Competition ===
The Vanda & Young Global Songwriting Competition is an annual competition that "acknowledges great songwriting whilst supporting and raising money for Nordoff-Robbins"; it is coordinated by Albert Music and APRA AMCOS. It commenced in 2009.

Year	Nominee / work	Award	Result	Ref.
2013	Isabella Manfredi for "Is This How You Feel?"	Vanda & Young Global Songwriting Competition	1st	
