= Tyne-James Organ =

Australian singer-songwriter

- Origin: Wollongong, New South Wales
- Genres: Indie rock
- Occupations: Singer; songwriter
- Instruments: Vocals; Guitar; Piano
- Years active: 2016–present
- Label: Dew Process (2017–present)
- Website: www.tynejamesorgan.com

Tyne-James Organ is an Australian singer-songwriter. His debut studio album, Necessary Evil, was released on 21 May 2021.

== Early life and education ==
Tyne-James Organ is from Wollongong, New South Wales.

== Career ==
=== Beginnings ===
Organ built an online support base uploading cover versions of songs on YouTube.

He supported The Vanns in 2014 at Shebeen in Melbourne, as well as Allday and UV Boi in 2016.

=== 2016–2019: Persevere ===
In 2016, Organ released his debut single "In My Arms".

In 2017, Organ signed with Dew Process and released the single "Watch You Go", which Hayden Davis from Pile Rats described as "a beautifully stripped-back ballad which will leave your heart aching with its personal message." The song was dedicated to his father, Rikki, who died from cancer in 2016.

In September 2019, Organ released his debut EP, Persevere.

=== 2020–2022: Necessary Evil ===
In May 2020, Organ released the single "Hold Me Back". The song, which was described by Australian Independent Record Labels Association as a "raw and formidable rock track" was inspired by the Me Too movement and his own interactions with misogyny in the night clubs of Melbourne. Organ said: "On a night out with friends, I witnessed a confronting and horrible incident of harassment against one of the female friends I was with. Seeing my friend be assaulted like that and seeing how it affected her really shocked me. We confronted the perpetrator and got him barred from the club. But knowing that so many women go through this experience, I just couldn't shake the sense of anger within me, and this song was written shortly after that awful night." Proceeds from the sales and streams of the song went towards White Ribbon Australia.

In March 2021, Organ announced the release of his debut album, Necessary Evil, alongside the single "Sunday Suit". The album was recorded in 2020 with Australian producer, engineer, songwriter and singer Chris Collins in Collins' studio at Stokers Siding in the New South Wales hinterland. Necessary Evil was released on 22 May 2021.

In June 2021, he performed at the Factory Theatre in Sydney, with his band comprising The Preatures guitarist Jack Moffitt, as well as Kelton Hirst and Andrew Banovich. The same band toured most of the Australian capitals in 2023.

=== 2023–present: The Other Side ===
In June 2023, Organ released the single, "Blue".

In May 2025, Organ released his second studio album, The Other Side. It was preceded by the singles "Blue", "All On Me" and "One Way Ticket".

== Personal life ==
Organ’s father was the Wollongong singer and entertainer Rikki Organ, who died in 2016.

As of 2017, Organ was living in Melbourne. In 2024, he revealed that he had been diagnosed with bipolar disorder.

== Discography ==
=== Studio albums ===
List of albums, with release date and label shown
Title	Details	Peak chart positions
Title	Details	AUS
Necessary Evil	Released: 22 May 2021; Label: Dew Process (DEW9001362); Formats: CD, LP digital download, streaming	51
The Other Side	Released: 16 May 2025; Label: Dew Process (DEW9001545); Formats: CD, LP, digital download, streaming	— (Note: The Other Side did not enter the ARIA Top 100 Chart, but peaked at number 10 on the Australian Artists Album Chart.)

=== Extended plays ===
List of EPs, with release date and label shown
Title	Details
Persevere	Released: 20 September 2019; Label: Dew Process; Formats: digital download, streaming

=== Singles ===
List of singles, with year released and album name shown
Title	Year	Album
"In My Arms"	2016	non album single
"Watch You Go"	2017	Persevere
"Graceful"	2018	Persevere
"Something New"	2019	Persevere
"Hold Me Back"	2020	Necessary Evil
"Not Ready for Love"	2020	Necessary Evil
"Sunday Suit"	2021	Necessary Evil
"London's Calling"	2021	Necessary Evil
"Honey"	2021	Necessary Evil
"Naïve" (Triple J Like a Version)	2022	non album single
"Blue"	2023	The Other Side
"All On Me"	2024	The Other Side
"One Way Ticket"	2025	The Other Side
"Come Down"	2025	The Other Side
"Worth My Time"	2025	The Other Side

=== Other certified songs ===
List of other charted songs, with selected chart positions
Title	Year	Certifications	Album
"Say No More"	2019	ARIA: Gold	Persevere

== Awards and nominations ==
=== ARIA Music Awards ===
The ARIA Music Awards is an annual ceremony presented by Australian Recording Industry Association (ARIA), which recognise excellence, innovation, and achievement across all genres of the music of Australia. They commenced in 1987.

Year	Nominee / work	Award	Result	Ref.
2021	Chris Collins for Necessary Evil by Tyne-James Organ	Engineer of the Year	Nominated	
