= Girlhood (album) =

Studio album by the Preatures
- Released: 11 August 2017
- Label: Universal Music Australia

The Preatures chronology
Blue Planet Eyes (2014)	Girlhood (2017)

Singles from Girlhood
- 1. "Girlhood" Released: 17 May 2017; 2. "Yanada" Released: August 2017; 3. "Magick" Released: April 2018

Girlhood is the second and final studio album by Australian rock band the Preatures, released on 11 August 2017 through Universal Music Australia. The album peaked a number 13 on the ARIA Charts.

The band said the album "is about the contradictions of being a modern woman."

== Reception ==
Professional ratings
Review scores
Source	Rating
DIY Mag	4/5 stars

Rhian Daly from DIY Mag said "Girlhood sparkles with creativity, from climactic ambient motifs to riffs that sound like they've been discovered in a long-forgotten record collection."

== Track listing ==
No.	Title	Writer(s)	Length
1.	"Girlhood"	Isabella Manfredi	2:34
2.	"The First Night"		5:18
3.	"Yanada"		5:20
4.	"Magick"		4:14
5.	"Your Fan"		3:39
6.	"Lip Balm"		2:18
7.	"Mess It Up"		3:07
8.	"Nite Machine"		4:07
9.	"Cherry Ripe"		4:39
10.	"I Like You"		4:39
11.	"Something New"		3:35
Total length:			43:25

== Charts ==
Chart (2017)	Peak position
Australian Albums (ARIA)	13
