= Hard for Me =

Single by Tamara Jaber
- Released: 1 August 2005
- Genre: Dance; pop
- Length: 4:00
- Label: King Kyle
- Songwriter(s): Philippe-Marc Anquetil; Christopher Lee-Joe; Tamara Jaber

Tamara Jaber singles chronology
"Ooh Ahh" (2005)	"Hard for Me" (2005)

"Hard for Me" is the second single by the Australian recording artist Tamara Jaber, released on 1 August 2005 by King Kyle Records.

== Production and release ==
"Hard for Me" was written by Philippe-Marc Anquetil, Christopher Lee-Joe and Tamara Jaber, and mixed by Vince Pazzinga. It was released as a CD single on 1 August 2005, with an instrumental version alongside the original. "Hard for Me" debuted at number 34 on the ARIA Singles Chart on 8 August 2005 and peaked at number 23 on 22 August 2005. On the ARIA Dance Singles Chart, it peaked at number five.

== Track listing ==
- CD single
1. "Hard for Me" – 4:00
2. "Hard for Me" (Instrumental) – 3:56

== Charts ==
Chart (2005)	Peak position
Australia (ARIA)	23
Australia Dance (ARIA)	5

== Release history ==
Country	Date	Format	Label	Catalogue
Australia	1 August 2005	CD single	King Kyle Records	KKR002
