= Bianca Moon =

Australian social campaigner (born 1988)

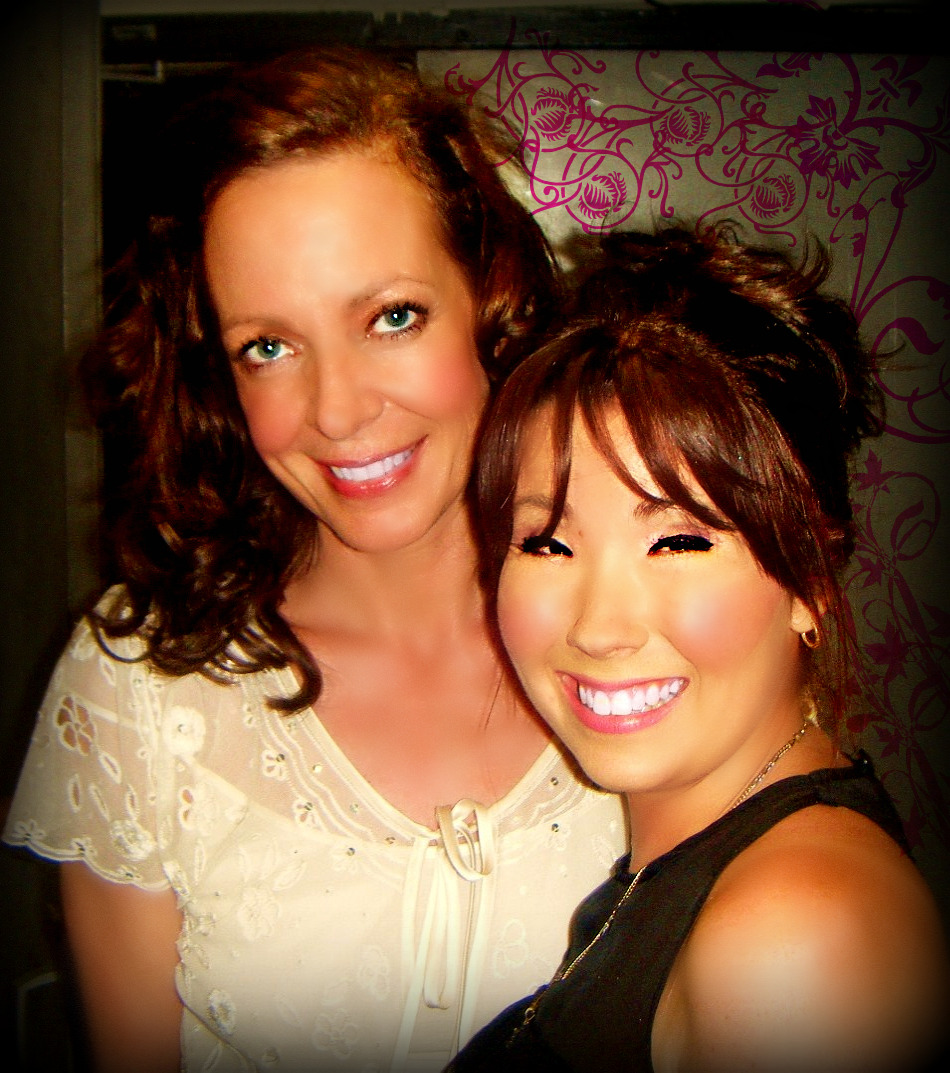
Bianca Moon (right) with Allison Janney (2008)

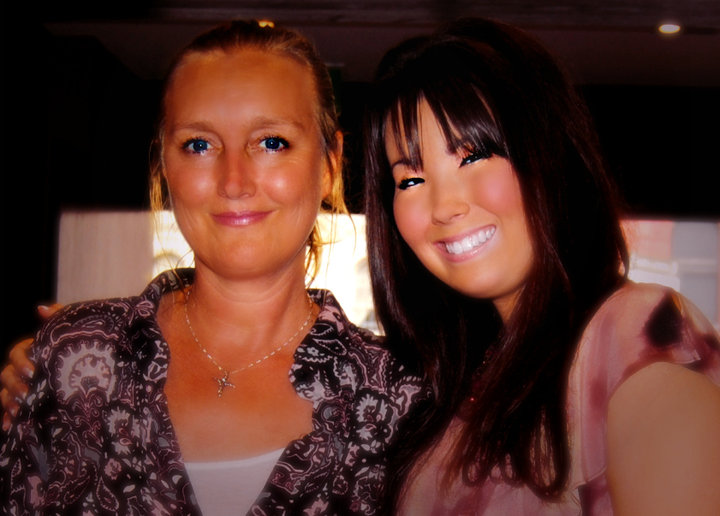
Bianca Moon (right) with Victoria Longley

Bianca Moon (born 14 December 1988) is an Australian singer-songwriter. She first came to attention in Australia, while still a teenager, for founding the equality campaign Truly Beauty's, and later gained attention for her Emmy-nominated song used in an episode of the American television series The Bold and the Beautiful.

== Music ==
Bianca released her first single, a cover of Marc Cohn's "Walking in Memphis", at age 14.

In 2013, Moon was nominated for the American Daytime Emmy Award for Outstanding Original Song for a Drama Series, as composer and lyricist for her song "The Sunflower", used in a 2012 episode of the CBS television soap opera The Bold and the Beautiful.

== Personal life ==
Moon was born with the craniofacial disfigurement blepharophimosis, and as a result she began her own charity, Truly Beauty's, when she was 16.

In the fall of 2007, Moon was a finalist in the selection process for the New South Wales (NSW) entry to the 2008 Young Australian of the Year award; the NSW committee recognized her for her work as an "Equality Campaigner".
