= Ooh Ahh (Tamara Jaber song) =

Single by Tamara Jaber
- Released: 19 April 2005
- Length: 3:45
- Label: King Kyle
- Songwriters: Christopher Lee-Joe; Philippe-Marc Anquetil; Tamara Jaber; M. Carre
- Producer: BNA

Tamara Jaber singles chronology
"Ooh Ahh" (2005)	"Hard for Me" (2005)

"Ooh Ahh" is the debut single by Australian recording artist Tamara Jaber, released on 19 April 2005 through King Kyle Records. The song was written by Jaber, Christopher Lee-Joe, Philippe-Marc Anquetil and M. Carre. Upon its release, "Ooh Ahh" peaked at number 13 on the ARIA Singles Chart and number one on the ARIA Dance Singles Chart.

== Background and reception ==
"Ooh Ahh" was written by Christopher Lee-Joe, Philippe-Marc Anquetil, Tamara Jaber and M. Carre. The song's lyrics are based on chants popularised in playgrounds, including "Ooh, ahh, I lost my bra / I left it in my boyfriend's car" and "Boys are rotten, made out of cotton / Girls are sexy, made out of Pepsi" and "Milk, milk, lemonade. Around the corner chocolate's made". "Ooh Ahh" was released as a CD single on 19 April 2005. It features the instrumental, a cappella and 7-inch mix versions of "Ooh Ahh" alongside the original version. Upon its release, the song debuted and peaked at number 13 on the ARIA Singles Chart and number one on the ARIA Dance Singles Chart.

In 2009, a readers' poll published in the Herald Sun declared "Ooh Ahh" to be the worst Australian song of all time. The article went on to accuse Jaber's then-partner Kyle Sandilands of nepotism for releasing it on his newly formed label King Kyle Records, adding that his radio station 2Day FM was the only one that played the track.

== Track listing ==
- Australian CD single
1. "Ooh Ahh" – 3:45
2. "Ooh Ahh" (instrumental) – 3:32
3. "Ooh Ahh" (a cappella) – 3:46
4. "Ooh Ahh" (7-inch mix) – 3:25

== Charts ==
=== Weekly charts ===
Chart (2005)	Peak position
Australia (ARIA)	13
Australian Dance (ARIA)	1

=== Year-end charts ===
Chart (2005)	Position
Australia (ARIA)	88
Australian Dance (ARIA)	11

== Release history ==
Country	Date	Format	Label	Ref.
Australia	19 April 2005	CD single	King Kyle	
