= Israel Cruz =

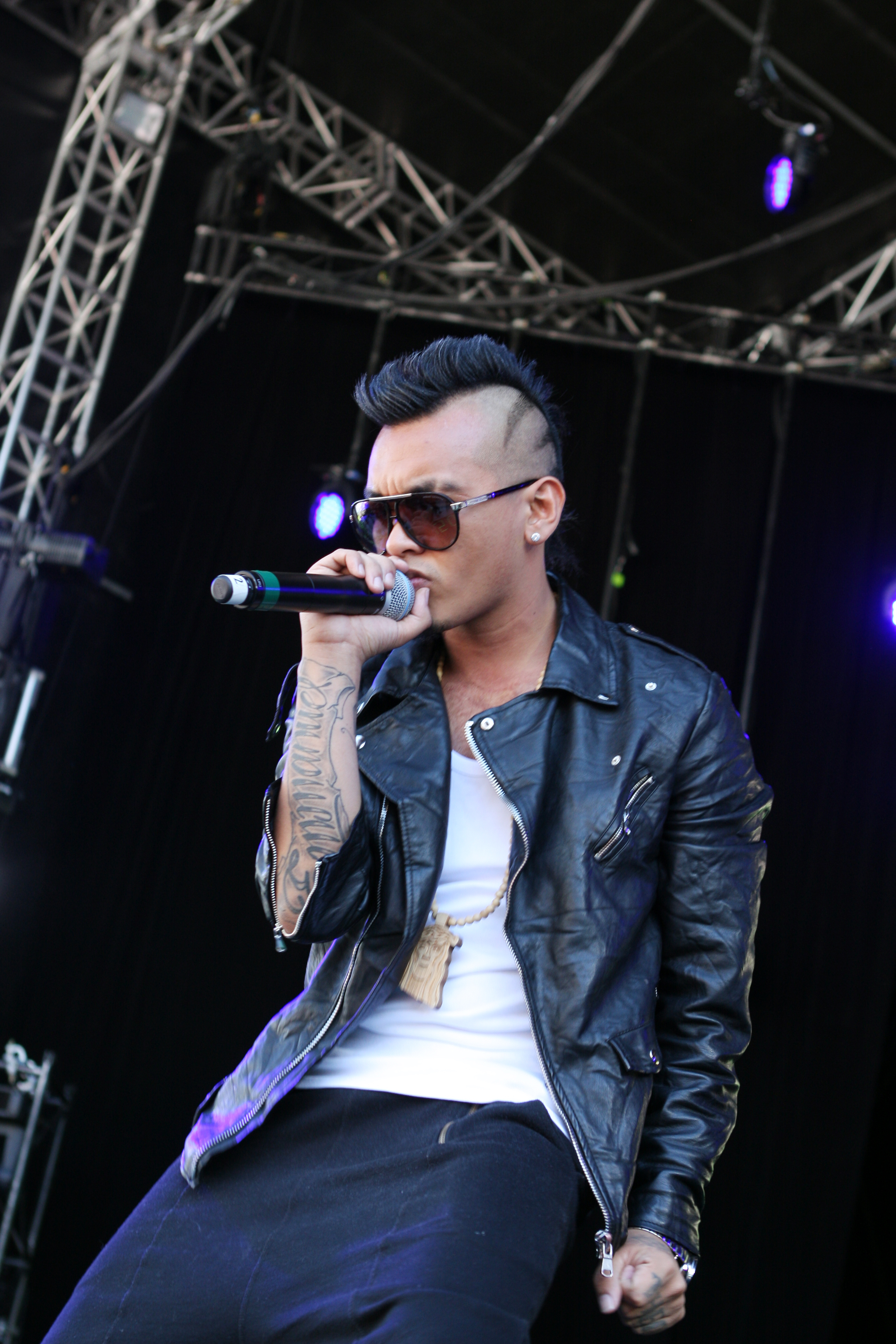
- Israel Cruz in April 2011

Background information
- Born: Israel Cruz; Quezon City, Philippines
- Origin: Sydney, Australia
- Genres: Pop, dance, R&B
- Occupations: Singer, songwriter, rapper, record producer
- Instrument: Vocals
- Years active: 2003–present
- Label: Nufirm Records

Israel Cruz is an Australian singer-songwriter and record producer. Cruz was born in Quezon City, Philippines and at the age of 3 moved to Melbourne, Australia with his family. He lives in Sydney, Australia with friends and has written and performed with Australian singer Stan Walker.

== Career ==
His single, "Party Up", was released as a digital download and an extended play. It peaked at number 33 on the Australian Singles Chart, becoming Cruz's highest-charting single since 2004's "Old Skool Luv". "Party Up" was certified Gold by the Australian Recording Industry Association (ARIA) for shipping 35,000 copies. Regarding the song's reception, Cruz stated in an interview with Dominic Di Francesco of Rhyme and Reason: "I feel like it’s been good. For me, it’s not about having a No.1 record. I focus on making good music that the people like. I’ve seen so many artists have so much more than me [with regards to] the deals that they get. But I haven’t needed a job since about 2004. I’ve learnt how to make money off music. I just love putting out records and I love the response "Party Up" has been getting. I feel like I'm always going to be the guy who makes these street anthems. One day, if it crosses over, thank God. But my thing is making music I like, putting it out and if the people love it – great!"

On January 14, 2005, Cruz starred in a musical theatre-style show "Israel" at the National Theatre in Saint Kilda, Melbourne, Australia. The event featured Israel's original music as it told the story of his journey through the music industry. The show featured rappers KA$H and Vallerie, and dance crews Detour, Funkey Fresh, Platinum, Replay, Rewind and ViKiNGs.

== Discography ==
=== Albums ===
Title	Details
Chapter One	Released: 2 September 2005; Formats: CD
The Legacy	Released: 3 July 2009; Formats: CD, digital download; Label: Nufirm

=== Singles ===
Year	Title	Peak chart positions	Certifications	Album
Year	Title	AUS	Certifications	Album
2004	"Wake Up With You"	44		Chapter One
2005	"Old Skool Luv" (featuring Valerii & Kg)	18		Chapter One
2005	"Work Da Middle Pt. 2" (featuring Thara)	59		Chapter One
2005	"My Girl"	—		Chapter One
2007	"Do It Again"	—		The Legacy
2007	"Gemini" featuring Fabolous	—		The Legacy
2009	"Freak Tonight"	68		The Legacy
2011	"Party Up"	33	ARIA: Gold	TBA
2012	"Save My Life" (featuring Elen Levon)	—		TBA
2012	"Body" (featuring The Twins)	—		TBA
"—" denotes releases that failed to chart.

=== Featured singles ===
Year	Title	Album
2011	"Naughty" (Elen Levon featuring Israel Cruz)	Non-album single
2012	"Hey Girl" (Dean Cassidy featuring Israel Cruz)	Non-album single

== Songwriting credits ==
- Elen Levon
  - "Naughty" (produced, featured)
- Jessica Mauboy
  - "Been Waiting" (co-wrote, produced)
  - "What Happened to Us" (co-wrote, co-produced)
- Ricki-Lee Coulter
  - "Wiggle It" (co-wrote, produced)
- Stan Walker
  - "All I Need" (co-wrote, produced)
  - "One Thing" (co-wrote, produced)
- Scarlett Belle
  - "Lover Boy" (also produced)
- Tinchy Stryder
  - "Famous" (also produced)

== Awards and nominations ==
Award	Category	About	Result
2006
Urban Music Awards Australia and New Zealand 2006	Best R&B Single – Work Da Middle	Himself	Nominated
Urban Music Awards Australia and New Zealand 2006	Best R&B Album – Chapter One	Himself	Nominated
Urban Music Awards Australia and New Zealand 2006	Best Video Clip – Work Da Middle	Himself	Nominated
APRA Music Awards 2006	Best Urban Music Songwriter	Himself	Nominated
2007
Urban Music Awards Australia and New Zealand 2007	Best R&B Single	Himself	Winner
Urban Music Awards Australia and New Zealand 2007	Best Male Artist	Himself	Nominated
APRA Music Awards 2007	Best Urban Music Songwriter	Himself	Nominated
