= Miracle (rapper) =

- Also known as: Miracle
- Born: Samson Andah; 17 May 1992 (age 33); Accra, Ghana
- Genres: Hip hop, pop, R&B
- Occupations: Rapper, singer
- Years active: 2010–present
- Labels: Sony Music, Nufirm

Samson Andah, better known by his stage name Miracle, is a Ghanaian Australian hip hop musician, based in Sydney, Australia. After being signed to Sony in 2010, Miracle has toured the country heavily, predominantly as a supporting artist for US based rappers and has also appeared independently on several festival rosters. After a string of mix tapes and stand alone singles, Miracle released the EP Mainland in the late 2014, featuring production from Styalz Fuego. and features American indie pop band Youngblood Hawke, on the single 'Endless Summer'.

Miracle now goes under the alias "BLESSED"

== Biography ==
Samson Andah, also known by stage name Miracle, was born inAccra, Ghana. He and his family moved to Australia shortly after his birth, first living in Melbourne, then Canberra and finally settling in the Sydney suburb of Quakers Hill in his teens. Andah suffered a respiratory infection at birth but was nicknamed the 'miracle' baby after he miraculously survived.

Andah first became interested in music after learning guitar, inspired by the music on his favorite skateboarding videos, before also playing drums in local punk bands. He first began experimenting with rap after being inspired by Kanye West's "College Dropout".

In 2010 Miracle made his first break as an artist, creating buzz in music circles with a track titled "Better Dayz", featuring samples from Australian folk artist, Pete Murray's single "Better Days". The track was originally a school project produced for his HSC. After uploading the tracks video clip onto YouTube. The success of the track gained the attention of recording artist Israel Cruz and Miracle was signed to Sony Music Entertainment later that year.

Acting under the guidance of Sony artist Israel Cruz, Miracle began recording tracks under Israel's record label subsidiary Nufirm Records. It was here that Miracle begun to release a multitude of tracks and mix tapes. Sighting creative differences Miracle left Nufirm to work solely for Sony Music Entertainment in late 2011.

The artist's popularity has been steadily growing after releasing a number of new projects and appearing as the supporting acts for Snoop Dogg, Big Boi, Lupe Fiasco, Maseo (of De La Soul), Rick Ross, Childish Gambino and ASAP Rocky on their Australian Tours. He has also worked on tracks with local and international acts, both as a writer and a performer including 360, Stan Walker, Jessica Mauboy, Timomatic, Justice Crew and Youngblood Hawke.

In early 2013, Miracle released the Motivation Mixtape which created a significant buzz on social media and led to other Australian hip hop artists such as 360 becoming a fan Miracle's work. Miracle has since earned a place on 360's 2014 album Utopia, on the track "Eddie Jones".

Miracle's first major EP Mainland, was released in 2014. It features production from ARIA award-winning Australian hip hop producer Styalz Fuego and long time friend and producer Nic Martin.

== Awards ==
=== Afro-Australia Music and Movie Awards ===
| Year | Nominee / work | Award | Result |
|---|---|---|---|
| 2014 | Miracle | Best Rap Artist | Won |

== Mixtapes ==
- Trash Musik (Mixtape)
- Trash Musik II (Mixtape)
- Before We Meet (Mixtape)
- Trash Musik III (Mixtape)
- Motivation (Mixtape)
- Sounds of the Youth (Mixtape)

== Albums ==
- iLLER EP (2012)
- Mainland (2014)

== Singles ==
- "Better Dayz"
- "I Dreamed"
- "Koolin"
- "Party of the Year"
- "Happiness"
- "Karate"
- "Never Gets Old"
- "Endless Summer" ft. Youngblood Hawke
