= ITunes Session (Chet Faker EP) =

iTunes Session

EP by Chet Faker
- Released: 28 November 2014
- Recorded: 2014
- Studio: Studios 301 (Sydney, Australia)
- Length: 33:27
- Label: Future Classic

Chet Faker chronology
Built on Glass (2014)	iTunes Session (2014)	Work (2015)

iTunes Session is an extended play (EP) by Australian electronic musician Chet Faker. It was released on 28 November 2014 exclusively on the iTunes Store through Future Classic. The six-track EP was recorded at Studios 301 in Sydney and features live versions of tracks originally for his debut album Built on Glass with the exception of "I'm Into You" which appeared on his 2012 debut EP, Thinking in Textures. The EP debuted and peaked at number 18 on the ARIA Albums Chart.

== Background ==
During 2014, Faker won five awards at the 2014 ARIA Awards, had a number 1 album in Australia and was given the J Award for Australian Album of the Year after recording and releasing his own iTunes Sessions album. "Gold" was given a solo piano rendition, while "Talk Is Cheap" features a cello.

== Track listing ==
All tracks are written by Nick Murphy.

No.	Title	Length
1.	"I'm Into You"	4:50
2.	"1998"	5:01
3.	"To Me"	8:14
4.	"Cigarettes & Loneliness"	6:51
5.	"Gold"	4:15
6.	"Talk Is Cheap"	4:16
Total length:		33:27

== Charts ==
Chart (2014)	Peak position
Australian Albums (ARIA)	18
Australian Independent Albums (AIR)	2

== Release history ==
Region	Date	Format	Label
Australia	28 November 2014	Digital download	Future Classic
