= Triple J's Hottest 100 of 2014 =

Most popular songs of the year in Australia

2014 Triple J Hottest 100

Countdown details
- Date of countdown: 26 January 2015
- Votes cast: 2,099,707

Countdown highlights
- Winning song: Chet Faker "Talk Is Cheap"
- Most entries: Chet Faker (4 tracks)

Chronology
← Previous; 2013	Next → 2015

The 2014 Triple J Hottest 100 was announced on January 26, 2015. It was the 22nd countdown of the most popular songs of the year, as chosen by the listeners of Australian radio station Triple J. It was won by "Talk Is Cheap", one of three songs that Chet Faker had in the top 10 (the others being "1998" and "Gold").

Voting commenced in mid-December 2014, and closed on 18 January 2015. Voters nominated ten songs that were released between December 2013 and November 2014 and submitted them through the Triple J website. In total, over 2 million votes were cast, breaking the previous record set in 2012. The year's countdown was notable for having seven Australian artists in the top ten and the top three positions being awarded to Australians, the first year for both to have occurred.

BuzzFeed campaigned for Taylor Swift's song "Shake It Off" but the track was eventually disqualified. Swift would later appear in the 2024 countdown, featuring on Gracie Abrams' song "Us".

== Full list ==
Note: Australian artists

#	Song	Artist	Country of origin
1	Talk Is Cheap	Chet Faker	Australia
2	High	Peking Duk featuring Nicole Millar	Australia
3	Cosby Sweater	Hilltop Hoods	Australia
4	Stolen Dance	Milky Chance	Germany
5	Take Me Over	Peking Duk featuring Safia	Australia
6	Uptown Funk	Mark Ronson featuring Bruno Mars	United Kingdom/United States
7	Gold	Chet Faker	Australia
8	1998	Chet Faker	Australia
9	Chandelier	Sia	Australia
10	King and Cross	Ásgeir	Iceland
11	Faded	Zhu	United States
12	Gooey	Glass Animals	United Kingdom
13	Mess Is Mine	Vance Joy	Australia
14	Every Other Freckle	alt-J	United Kingdom
15	Arcadia	The Kite String Tangle	Australia
16	Left Hand Free	alt-J	United Kingdom
17	Tightrope	Illy featuring Scarlett Stevens	Australia
18	Yellow Flicker Beat	Lorde	New Zealand
19	She Only Loves Me When I'm There	Ball Park Music	Australia
20	Gold Snafu	Sticky Fingers	Australia
21	(Lover) You Don't Treat Me No Good (Like a Version)	Chet Faker	Australia
22	Pittsburgh	The Amity Affliction	Australia
23	Seasons (Waiting on You)	Future Islands	United States
24	Roll Up Your Sleeves	Meg Mac	Australia
25	I'll Go Crazy	Bluejuice	Australia
26	Hunger of the Pine	alt-J	United Kingdom
27	Beggin for Thread	Banks	United States
28	Beware the Dog	The Griswolds	Australia
29	Somebody's Talking	The Preatures	Australia
30	Something I Said	Thundamentals featuring Thom Crawford	Australia
31	Sober	Childish Gambino	United States
32	West Coast	Lana Del Rey	United States
33	Run	San Cisco	Australia
34	New Dorp. New York	SBTRKT featuring Ezra Koenig	United Kingdom/United States
35	You Always Know the DJ	Allday	Australia
36	Won't Let You Down	Hilltop Hoods featuring Maverick Sabre	Australia/United Kingdom
37	I Want U	Alison Wonderland	Australia
38	My Silver Lining	First Aid Kit	Sweden
39	Two Bodies	Flight Facilities featuring Emma Louise	Australia
40	Mother & Father	Broods	New Zealand
41	Maybe	Carmada	Australia
42	Window to the Sky	Kim Churchill	Australia
43	Zombie	Jamie T	United Kingdom
44	Flashed Junk Mind	Milky Chance	Germany
45	Two Weeks	FKA twigs	United Kingdom
46	Grandma's Hands	Meg Mac	Australia
47	Tennis Court (Flume Remix)	Lorde	New Zealand/Australia
48	Delete	DMA's	Australia
49	Happy Idiot	TV on the Radio	United States
50	First Time	Vance Joy	Australia
51	Pickles from the Jar	Courtney Barnett	Australia
52	Sunshine	Flight Facilities featuring Reggie Watts	Australia/United States
53	i	Kendrick Lamar	United States
54	Do I Wanna Know? (Like a Version)	Chvrches	United Kingdom
55	Can't Do Without You	Caribou	Canada
56	ICFTYDLM	Kingswood	Australia
57	Walking Under Stars	Hilltop Hoods	Australia
58	Everything Is Shit Except My Friendship with You	Ball Park Music	Australia
59	Monument (The Inevitable End Version)	Röyksopp and Robyn	Norway/Sweden
60	Sweatpants	Childish Gambino	United States
61	Talk Too Much	Andy Bull	Australia
62	Heart Beats Slow	Angus & Julia Stone	Australia
63	Red Eyes	The War on Drugs	United States
64	Don't Lean on Me	The Amity Affliction	Australia
65	Right Now	Allday	Australia
66	Work Work	clipping. featuring Cocc Pistol Cree	United States
67	Busy Earnin'	Jungle	United Kingdom
68	Drown	Bring Me the Horizon	United Kingdom
69	Surrender	The Smith Street Band	Australia
70	Is It a Banger?	Odd Mob	Australia
71	The Weigh Down	The Amity Affliction	Australia
72	Close Your Eyes (And Count to Fuck)	Run the Jewels featuring Zack de la Rocha	United States
73	Do It Again	Röyksopp and Robyn	Norway/Sweden
74	I Got U	Duke Dumont featuring Jax Jones	United Kingdom
75	Live It Up	360 featuring Pez	Australia
76	Micro Wars	Kingswood	Australia
77	Since Last Wednesday	Highasakite	Norway
78	Quit Your Job	Thundamentals	Australia
79	Lazaretto	Jack White	United States
80	I Don't Want to Be Here Anymore	Rise Against	United States
81	Fade Out Lines	The Avener	France
82	Dreamers	Hopium featuring Phoebe Lou	Australia
83	Wrong Direction	British India	Australia
84	Something from Nothing	Foo Fighters	United States
85	Get Away	Chvrches	United Kingdom
86	Just for You	Sticky Fingers	Australia
87	Bad Apples	Briggs	Australia
88	Gina Works at Hearts	DZ Deathrays	Australia
89	First	Cold War Kids	United States
90	Got Love	Thundamentals featuring Solo	Australia
91	Bridges (Like a Version)	Meg Mac	Australia
92	Love Me Less	One Day	Australia
93	Georgia	Vance Joy	Australia
94	Liquorlip Loaded Gun	Sticky Fingers	Australia
95	How Much Does Your Love Cost?	Thelma Plum	Australia
96	Paranoia, Ghosts & Other Sounds	Safia	Australia
97	Between Friends	Japanese Wallpaper featuring Jesse Davidson	Australia
98	Luna	Bombay Bicycle Club	United Kingdom
99	Trippin' The Light Fantastic	Ball Park Music	Australia
100	Switch Lanes	Tkay Maidza	Australia

=== #101–#200 List ===
On 1 February 2015, Triple J announced the songs placed 101–200th in the poll.

#	Song	Artist	Country of origin
101	Tell Me	Golden Features featuring Nicole Millar	Australia
102	Little Monster	Royal Blood	United Kingdom
103	Pray to God	Calvin Harris featuring Haim	United Kingdom/United States
104	So Soldier	#1 Dads featuring Ainslie Wills	Australia
105	Figure It Out	Royal Blood	United Kingdom
106	Torrent	Ásgeir	Iceland
107	L.A.F	Broods	New Zealand
108	Going Home	Ásgeir	Iceland
109	Arrows	Fences featuring Macklemore & Ryan Lewis	United States
110	Coming of Age	Foster the People	United States
111	Cocoon	Catfish & the Bottlemen	United Kingdom
112	I Don't Wanna Die Anymore	The Smith Street Band	Australia
113	Cocaine Lion	Ball Park Music	Australia
114	Stunner	Milky Chance	Germany
115	Tell Me	RL Grime and What So Not	United States/Australia
116	Heavenly Father	Bon Iver	United States
117	Ten Tonne Skeleton	Royal Blood	United Kingdom
118	Bullit	Watermät	France
119	Down on My Luck	Vic Mensa	United States
120	Ordinary	The Preatures	Australia
121	Fever	The Black Keys	United States
122	Talk Talk	George Maple	Australia
123	Bones	Dustin Tebbutt	Australia
124	Rum Rage	Sticky Fingers	Australia
125	All This Could Be Yours	Cold War Kids	United States
126	Forgive & Forget	The Kooks	United Kingdom
127	Inspector Norse	Todd Terje	Norway
128	Carol	The Peep Tempel	Australia
129	Ultraviolence	Lana Del Rey	United States
130	Look of Love	The Jezabels	Australia
131	Create/Destroy	Art vs. Science	Australia
132	All the Rage Back Home	Interpol	United States
133	I'm Not Coming Back	Husky	Australia
134	Leave Your Windows Open	One Day	Australia
135	Break the Bank	Schoolboy Q	United States
136	The Same Man	Dan Sultan	Australia
137	Merewif	Willow Beats	Australia
138	My Heart is a Wheel	Megan Washington	Australia
139	Paradise Awaits	Zhu	United States
140	Land of Pleasure	Sticky Fingers	Australia
141	Happy (Like a Version)	John Butler Trio	Australia
142	Price of Fame	360 featuring Gossling	Australia
143	Better Than It Ever Could Be	The Preatures	Australia
144	Flicker	Porter Robinson	United States
145	Born to Break Your Heart	Saskwatch	Australia
146	Breathe In	Japanese Wallpaper featuring Wafia	Australia
147	Pool	Glass Animals	United Kingdom
148	Aerosol Can	Major Lazer featuring Pharrell Williams	United States
149	Brain	Banks	United States
150	Cigarettes & Loneliness	Chet Faker	Australia
151	Daffodils	Mark Ronson featuring Kevin Parker	United Kingdom/Australia
152	Hey Now (Like a Version)	Karnivool	Australia
153	Your Graduation	Modern Baseball	United States
154	Are You What You Want to Be?	Foster the People	United States
155	Bugatti	Tiga featuring Pusha T	Canada/United States
156	If You Go	Sticky Fingers	Australia
157	The Art of the Handshake	Hilltop Hoods	Australia
158	Death's Hand	The Amity Affliction	Australia
159	Seeya	Deadmau5 featuring Colleen D'Agostino	Canada/United States
160	Hold Me Down	Mansionair	Australia
161	To Me	Chet Faker	Australia
162	Eez-eh	Kasabian	United Kingdom
163	Get Home	Angus & Julia Stone	Australia
164	Best Friend	Foster the People	United States
165	Feels Like We Only Go Backwards (Like a Version)	Alex Turner	United Kingdom
166	Give It All	The Amity Affliction	Australia
167	Stolen Dance (Like a Version)	Ásgeir	Iceland
168	Wasted Pilots	Airling	Australia
169	Down	The Kooks	United Kingdom
170	West Coast (Like a Version)	James Vincent McMorrow	Ireland
171	Go	Grimes featuring Blood Diamonds	Canada/United States
172	I Blame Myself	Sky Ferreira	United States
173	Memories That You Call	Odesza featuring Monsoonsiren	United States/India
174	Never Gonna Change	Broods	New Zealand
175	Divine	In Hearts Wake	Australia
176	Never Tear Us Apart (Like a Version)	Allday	Australia
177	Lost & Fading	The Amity Affliction	Australia
178	Burn the Pages	Sia	Australia
179	You Are the One	Safia	Australia
180	Good Mistake	Mr Little Jeans	Norway
181	Long Way Down	Robert DeLong	United States
182	Earthwalker	In Hearts Wake	Australia
183	Telegraph Ave.	Childish Gambino	United States
184	What the Devil Has Made	Matt Corby	Australia
185	Attak	Rustie featuring Danny Brown	United Kingdom/United States
186	F.M.L.	The Amity Affliction	Australia
187	Rot	Northlane	Australia
188	Goodbye Future	The Presets	Australia
189	Dreamland	Sticky Fingers	Australia
190	A Heartbreak	Angus & Julia Stone	Australia
191	Recess	Skrillex and Kill the Noise featuring Fatman Scoop and Michael Angelakos	United States
192	Laced	DMA's	Australia
193	U-Huh	Tkay Maidza	Australia
194	Down by the River	Milky Chance	Germany
195	The Haunted	Northeast Party House	Australia
196	Dalai Lama, Big Banana, Marijuana	Dune Rats	Australia
197	Survive	L-FRESH the Lion featuring MK-1	Australia
198	Satisfy	Nero	United Kingdom
199	Cuckoo	Raleigh Ritchie featuring Little Simz	United Kingdom
200	Weekend	Priory	United States

== Statistics ==
=== Artists with multiple entries ===
#	Artist	Entries
4	Chet Faker	1, 7, 8, 21
3	Hilltop Hoods	3, 36, 57
3	Vance Joy	13, 50, 93
3	alt-J	14, 16, 26
3	Ball Park Music	19, 58, 99
3	Sticky Fingers	20, 86, 94
3	The Amity Affliction	22, 64, 71
3	Meg Mac	24, 46, 91
3	Thundamentals	30, 78, 90
2	Peking Duk	2, 5
2	Milky Chance	4, 44
2	Safia (Note: Once with Peking Duk (5), once as a lead artist (96))	5, 96
2	Scarlett Stevens (Note: Once with Illy (17), once with San Cisco (33))	17, 33
2	Lorde	18, 47
2	Childish Gambino	31, 60
2	Allday	35, 65
2	Flight Facilities	39, 52
2	Chvrches	54, 85
2	Kingswood	56, 76
2	Röyksopp (Note: Twice with Robyn)	59, 73
2	Robyn (Note: Twice with Röyksopp)	59, 73

=== Countries represented ===
Country	Total
Australia	60
United States	18
United Kingdom	15
New Zealand	3
Sweden	3
Norway	3
Germany	2
Canada	1
France	1
Iceland	1

=== Records ===
- The 2014 Hottest 100 marks only the third time all Top 3 songs have been from Australian artists, following the countdowns for 1999 and 2006.
- 78 unique musical acts appeared on this countdown, 15 of which featured additional artists collaborating.
- This year's Hottest 100 gathered over 2 million votes, the first to break the 2 million vote mark and the holds the record for the highest number of votes in a single countdown.
- Chet Faker is the first artist to win the Hottest 100, Triple J Album Poll, the J Award and achieve the most tracks in a countdown in a single year.
  - Chet Faker joins Denis Leary (1993), Alex Lloyd (2001), Bernard Fanning (2005) and Vance Joy (2013) as the only outright solo countdown winners.
  - Chet Faker became the second artist to chart three times in the top 10 places after Powderfinger achieved the feat in 2003.
- Royal Blood became the fourth band after Doves in 2000, Bloc Party in 2008 and Cut Copy in 2011 to make the albums poll but not feature in the Hottest 100. It was later revealed by Triple J that the band had come 102nd, 105th and 117th.
- Vance Joy is the first artist since Franz Ferdinand in 2005 to feature in the Hottest 100 the year after winning the countdown.
- The song "Do I Wanna Know?" by the Arctic Monkeys charted in the countdown for the second year in a row after a cover by Chvrches featured at No. 54. Similarly "Tennis Court" by Lorde which came second in the previous years countdown, came in at No. 47 with a remix by Flume.
- Illy made his sixth consecutive appearance in the Hottest 100, having appeared in every annual countdown since 2009. Similarly, Flight Facilities made their fifth consecutive appearance, having appeared since 2010.
- This year marked the end of the annual Hottest 100 DVD releases.
- "Chandelier" by Sia charted at No. 9 despite never having been played on Triple J.

== CD release ==
The Triple J Hottest 100 CD for 2014 is the twenty second edition of the series. The track list was revealed on Triple J's Facebook page on 2 February 2015; the double-CD was released on 27 February 2015.

No.	Title	Artist(s)	Length
1.	"Talk Is Cheap" (#1)	Chet Faker	3:39
2.	"High" (#2)	Peking Duk featuring Nicole Millar	3:52
3.	"Cosby Sweater" (#3)	Hilltop Hoods	3:36
4.	"Stolen Dance" (#4)	Milky Chance	5:14
5.	"King And Cross" (#10)	Ásgeir	3:30
6.	"Faded" (#11)	ZHU	3:42
7.	"I Want U" (#37)	Alison Wonderland	3:37
8.	"Pittsburgh" (#22)	The Amity Affliction	3:41
9.	"Every Other Freckle" (#14)	alt-J	3:36
10.	"Something I Said" (#30)	Thundamentals featuring Thom Crawford	3:58
11.	"Happy Idiot" (#49)	TV On The Radio	3:03
12.	"Window To The Sky" (#42)	Kim Churchill	4:10
13.	"Roll Up Your Sleeves" (#24)	Meg Mac	3:02
14.	"Maybe" (#41)	Carmada	3:32
15.	"Run" (#33)	San Cisco	2:51
16.	"Pickles From The Jar" (#51)	Courtney Barnett	2:55
17.	"Beggin For Thread" (#27)	Banks	4:10
18.	"Arcadia" (#15)	The Kite String Tangle	3:50
19.	"She Only Loves Me When I'm There" (#19)	Ball Park Music	4:24
20.	"Sober" (#31)	Childish Gambino	4:12
21.	"West Coast" (#32)	Lana Del Rey	4:17

Disc 2
No.	Title	Artist(s)	Length
1.	"Uptown Funk" (#6)	Mark Ronson featuring Bruno Mars	4:30
2.	"Chandelier" (#9)	Sia	3:36
3.	"Mess Is Mine" (#13)	Vance Joy	3:44
4.	"Gooey" (#12)	Glass Animals	4:49
5.	"Somebody's Talking" (#29)	The Preatures	3:20
6.	"Seasons (Waiting On You)" (#23)	Future Islands	3:47
7.	"Tightrope" (#17)	Illy featuring Scarlett Stevens	4:00
8.	"Gold Snafu" (#20)	Sticky Fingers	3:54
9.	"I'll Go Crazy" (#25)	Bluejuice	3:23
10.	"Beware The Dog" (#28)	The Griswolds	3:14
11.	"New Dorp, New York" (#34)	SBTRKT featuring Ezra Koenig	3:50
12.	"Two Weeks" (#45)	FKA Twigs	4:08
13.	"My Silver Lining" (#38)	First Aid Kit	3:35
14.	"Delete" (#48)	DMA's	3:26
15.	"I Can Feel That You Don't Love Me" (#56)	Kingswood	4:17
16.	"You Always Know The DJ" (#35)	Allday	3:11
17.	"Two Bodies" (#39)	Flight Facilities featuring Emma Louise	4:43
18.	"Mother & Father" (#40)	Broods	3:30
19.	"Zombie" (#43)	Jamie T	3:10
20.	"Surrender" (#69)	The Smith Street Band	3:42
21.	"Can't Do Without You" (#55)	Caribou	3:56

== Top 10 Albums of 2014 ==
A smaller poll of Triple J listeners' favourite albums of the year was held in December 2014.

Note: Australian artists

#	Artist	Album	Country of origin	Hottest 100 Entries
1	Chet Faker	Built on Glass	Australia	1, 7, 8, (65 in 2013)
2	Ball Park Music	Puddinghead	Australia	19, 58, 99
3	alt-J	This Is All Yours	United Kingdom	14, 16, 26
4	Hilltop Hoods	Walking Under Stars	Australia	3, 36, 57
5	Sticky Fingers	Land of Pleasure	Australia	20, 86, 94
6	Flight Facilities	Down to Earth	Australia	39, 52, (19 in 2010), (17 in 2012), (48 in 2013), (83, 85 in 2015)
7	Royal Blood	Royal Blood	United Kingdom	DNC (102, 105, 117 in Hottest 200)
8	Vance Joy	Dream Your Life Away	Australia	13, 50, 93, (1 in 2013), (16 in 2015)
9	Thundamentals	So We Can Remember	Australia	30, 78, 90, (32 in 2013)
10	The Preatures	Blue Planet Eyes	Australia	29, (9 in 2013)
