= Bend (song) =

Single by Chet Faker
- Released: 19 June 2015
- Recorded: 2013
- Genre: Electronica; alternative dance
- Length: 3:25
- Label: Future Classic
- Songwriter: Nicholas Murphy
- Producer: Nicholas Murphy

Chet Faker singles chronology
"Gold" (2014)	"Bend" (2015)	"The Trouble with Us" (2015)

"Bend" is a song by Australian musician Chet Faker. It was released as a digital single in Australia on 19 June 2015 through Future Classic.

Faker announced a new Australian tour and premiered the song on the Matt and Alex show on Triple J on 17 June. During the interview Faker said the song was intended to be on his debut album Built on Glass, but was ultimately replaced by "To Me". Faker said, "Ever since it got cut from the album it's just been sitting on my iTunes, sitting there looking at me. Usually when I cut a song after a few months I'm like 'yeah cool, that song's dead' but it's been annoying me... [so] it was either never going to be put out, or now, with this tour." "I recorded it in 2013 and kinda wanted to put it out since. It's always felt like a part of Built on Glass and since [the upcoming Australian] tour is the sort of live 'director's cut' of the album it made sense to release this before it lost context."

== Track listing ==
Digital download
No.	Title	Length
1.	"Bend"	3:25

== Charts ==
Chart (2015)	Peak position
Australia (ARIA)	48
Australian Independent Singles (AIR)	2

== Release history ==
Region	Date	Format	Label
Australia	19 June 2015	Digital download	Future Classic
