= Drop the Game =

Single by Flume and Chet Faker

from the album Lockjaw
- Released: 18 November 2013
- Recorded: 2013
- Genre: Downtempo; future bass
- Length: 3:41
- Label: Future Classic
- Songwriters: Harley Streten; Nick Murphy

Flume singles chronology
"Holdin On" (2012)	"Drop the Game" (2013)	"Some Minds" (2015)

Chet Faker singles chronology
"Love and Feeling" (2012)	"Drop the Game" (2013)	"Talk Is Cheap" (2014)

"Drop the Game" is a song by the Australian musicians Flume and Chet Faker. It was released on 18 November 2013, by Future Classic from their EP, Lockjaw. The song peaked at number 18 on the ARIA Singles Chart and was certified Platinum by the Australian Recording Industry Association for shipments exceeding 70,000 copies. It was voted number five on radio station Triple J's Hottest 100 of 2013. The song was also nominated for Best Dance Release at the ARIA Music Awards of 2014, but it lost to "High" by Peking Duk.

It was released as a CD single in Germany on 23 January 2015.

== Background ==
Flume and Faker had previously worked together on the track "Left Alone" from Flume's 2012 album, Flume. In September 2013, Flume announced that he and Faker had recorded an EP, which was released in November 2013.

== Reviews ==
Josh Dixon of Renowned for Sound wrote, "'Drop the Game' is a slow-moving, head-bopping, thump of an electronic anthem. It's been a long time since I've heard a song that's draws me in so much that I end up playing it on repeat for hours on end, but that's exactly what happened upon first hearing this track. 'Drop the Game' is soulful with Faker's sultry cool voice laid before Flume's high-pitched frequencies and deep drones of bass. It's as close to perfect as electronic music has come in a long time. What's clear here is the simple fact that these two musicians have effectively combined their individual talents and the results are simply spellbinding." Alim Kheraj of Planet Notion wrote, "'Drop the Game' wonderfully incorporates Faker's luscious vocal prowess, while allowing Flume to generate his distinctive swishing synths."

== Music video ==
The video for "Drop the Game" was released on 18 November 2013. It shows the Brooklyn-based street dancer Storyboard P jookin on the street outside a collision repair shop in Brooklyn, New York (230-254 Lorraine St, Brooklyn, NY 11231).

In January 2021, the video had over 183 million views on YouTube.

== Track listing ==
- German CD single
1. "Drop the Game" (single version) – 3:32
2. "Drop the Game" – 3:42

== Charts ==
Chart (2013–14)	Peak position
Australia (ARIA)	18
Australian Independent Singles (AIR)	1
France (SNEP)	125

=== Year-end charts ===
Chart (2014)	Position
Australian Artist Singles (ARIA)	29

== Certifications ==
Region	Certification	Certified units/sales
Australia (ARIA)	Platinum	70,000^{^}
New Zealand (RMNZ)	2× Platinum	60,000^{‡}
United Kingdom (BPI)	Silver	200,000^{‡}
^{^} Shipments figures based on certification alone.^{‡} Sales+streaming figures based on certification alone.
