= Something I Said =

Single by Thundamentals featuring Thom Crawford

from the album So We Can Remember
- Released: 28 February 2014
- Length: 3:29
- Label: Obese
- Songwriter(s): Brendan Tuckerman; Jesse Ferris

Thundamentals singles chronology
"Noodle Soup" (2013)	"Something I Said" (2014)	"Quit Your Job" (2014)

"Something I Said" is a song by Australian hip hop group Thundamentals featuring Thom Crawford, released on 28 February 2014 through Obese Records as the second single from their fourth studio album So We Can Remember (2014).

"Something I Said" peaked at number 66 on the ARIA charts, making it the group's highest charting single to date. The track was listed at number 30 in the Triple J Hottest 100, 2014.

== Music video ==
The official music video for the song was uploaded to YouTube on 6 April 2014. It was produced by Made In Katana. It depicts a man, played by Crawford, meditating in the bath when his roommate accidentally knocks a hair dryer into the bath, electrocuting him. At the funeral, the guests sing along to the chorus, as does Crawford while in the coffin. In the woods, the Thundamentals play the grave diggers and bury his coffin. After his burial, a lightning strike brings him back to life, only for Jeswon to smash him over the head with a shovel, killing him again. As of 31 July 2016, the video had over 736,100 views.

== Charts ==
Chart (2014)	Peak position
ARIA Singles Chart	66

== Certifications ==
Region	Certification	Certified units/sales
Australia (ARIA)	Gold	35,000^{‡}
^{‡} Sales+streaming figures based on certification alone.
