= Chet Faker =

Australian electronic musician (born 1988)

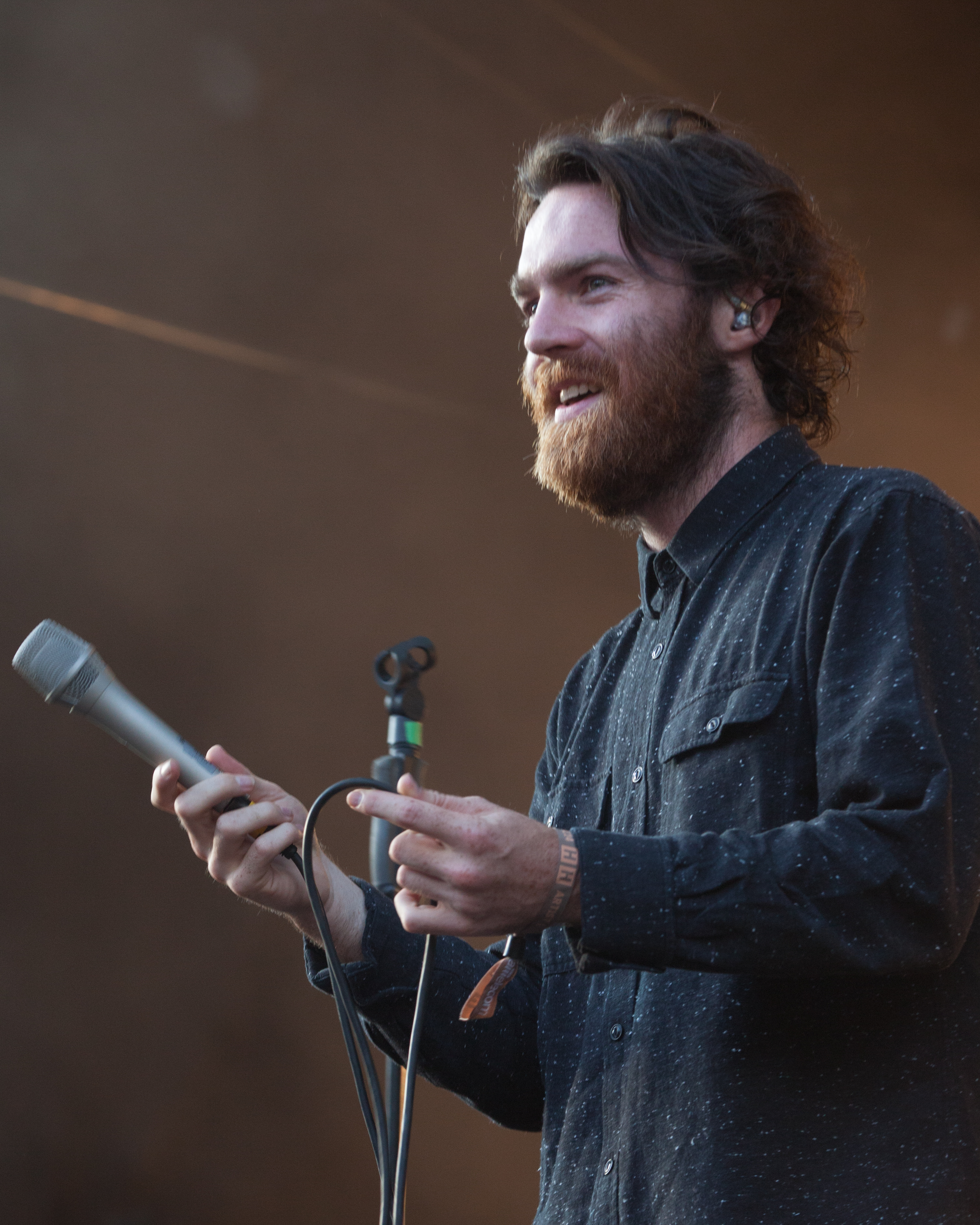
- At the Positivus Festival, Latvia 2014

Background information
- Also known as: Nick Murphy (2016–2020)
- Born: Nicholas James Murphy; 23 June 1988 (age 38); Melbourne, Victoria, Australia
- Genres: Electronica; downtempo; soul; trip hop
- Occupations: Singer; songwriter
- Instruments: Vocals; piano; keyboards; bass guitar; synthesizer; percussion; programming; guitar
- Years active: 2011–present
- Labels: Opulent; Remote Control; Chess Club; Downtown; Future Classic; MapleMusic; Detail
- Website: nickmurphy.com

Nicholas James Murphy (born 23 June 1988), known professionally as Chet Faker, is an Australian singer and songwriter. In 2012, as Chet Faker, he issued an extended play, Thinking in Textures, and signed to Downtown Records in the United States. In October 2012, he won Breakthrough Artist of the Year and Thinking in Textures won Best Independent Single/EP at the Australian Independent Records Awards. In January 2013, Work won Best Independent Release at the Rolling Stone Australia Awards for 2012.

Murphy's cover of Blackstreet's "No Diggity" was featured in a 2013 Super Bowl commercial for Beck's Sapphire. In April 2014, Built on Glass, his debut studio album, was released to generally positive reviews and debuted at number one on the Australian ARIA Charts. Three tracks from the album were voted into the top ten of Triple J's Hottest 100 of 2014, including the number one spot for "Talk Is Cheap".

In September 2016, Murphy dropped the Chet Faker name to start performing and releasing material under his birth name, beginning with the release of a pair of singles later that year, and the Missing Link extended play in 2017. Murphy's second studio album – the first under his birth name – Run Fast Sleep Naked was released in April 2019. This was followed up by a surprise instrumental album, Music for Silence, in March 2020, initially released via the Calm meditation app.

In October 2020, four years after dropping the moniker, Murphy revived the Chet Faker name for the release of a new single, "Low".

== Early life ==
Murphy grew up in Melbourne and attended St Kevin’s College alongside fellow singer Vance Joy, who he sang in a school choir with. Growing up he was also a talented runner, captaining his school’s Cross country team and being deputy captain of athletics. His parents separated when he was young which saw him regularly moving houses. He lived in a number of different Melbourne suburbs growing up which included Glen Iris, Ivanhoe, Burnley and Hawthorn.

== Career ==
=== Early career ===
Murphy played under his stage name after people came to his shows thinking he was a different and already established musician, Nick Murphy. He settled on the name as a homage to Chet Baker: "I listened to a lot of jazz and I was a big fan of ... the way he sang, when he moved into mainstream singing. He had this really fragile vocal style—this really, broken, close-up and intimate style. The name is kind of just an ode to Chet Baker and the mood of music he used to play—something I would like to at least pay homage to in my own music." Other influences he has cited include Bob Dylan, as well as his mother's Motown albums and his father's "chilled out Ibiza CDs".

=== Thinking in Textures and collaborations (2011–13) ===
He first rose to prominence after his cover of Blackstreet's "No Diggity" went viral online, reaching number one on the Hypemachine chart in May 2011. He released his first extended play, Thinking in Textures, on 22 March 2012 to positive reviews, being described as "wonderfully loungey" and praised for its ability to "mix subtlety with impressive beauty". The EP was also popular with fans, with its second single, "I'm into You", landing at number 24 on Triple J's Hottest 100 of 2012.

Murphy has collaborated with Flume and remixes of songs by MS MR and The Temper Trap. He was a featured vocalist on Say Lou Lou's "Fool of Me", which was named Best New Track by Pitchfork in May 2013.

=== Lockjaw EP and Built on Glass (2013–15) ===
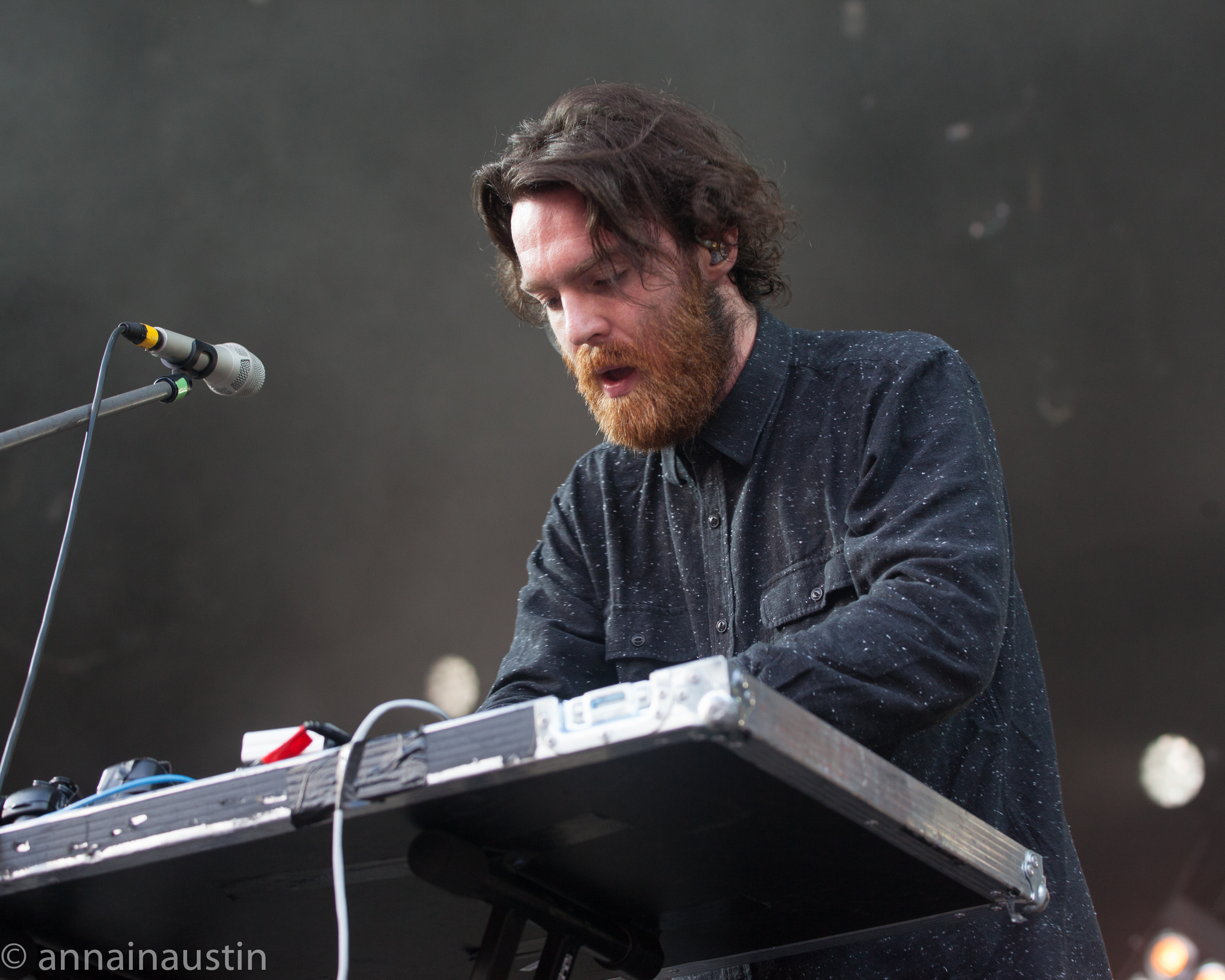
Murphy performing at the Positivus Music Festival, Salacgrīva, Latvia, in July 2014.

On 12 August 2013, Murphy released a new single, "Melt", featuring American vocalist Kilo Kish. In November 2013 Flume and Murphy released an EP, titled Lockjaw. Murphy released his debut studio album, Built on Glass, on 11 April 2014. The album's full release was preceded by its lead single, "Talk Is Cheap", and an accompanying music video on 11 February 2014. The album debuted at number one on the ARIA Charts.

Murphy performed at the Boston Calling Music Festival in May 2015. Later that month, "Talk Is Cheap" was named the number-one song in the 2014 Triple J Hottest 100, while two other singles, "Gold" and "1998", also reached the top ten, placing at number 7 and 8, respectively. In June, Murphy released a new single, "Bend", a previously unreleased track intended for Built on Glass. It was promoted by his Australian Built on Live tour in October.

Murphy released a new EP, Work, a collaboration with London-based DJ Marcus Marr on 4 December 2015.

=== Nick Murphy (2016–2019) ===
On 8 September 2016, the artist wrote on his Facebook page, "It's been half a decade since I started releasing music as Chet Faker and all of you have been the driving force behind the music since. There's an evolution happening and I wanted to let you know where it's going. The next record will be under my own name, Nick Murphy. Chet Faker will always be a part of the music. This is next."

=== Chet Faker revival (2020–present) ===
In October 2020, Murphy revived the Chet Faker social media accounts and released "Low", his first single under the Chet Faker moniker since 2016. This marked his first release through BMG Australia & New Zealand, with whom he had recently signed a record deal.

In October 2025, Faker announced his album A Love for Strangers would be released in February 2026.

== Discography ==
=== Studio albums ===
List of studio albums, with selected chart positions and certifications
Title	Album details	Peak chart positions										Certifications
Title	Album details	AUS	AUS Dance	AUS Indie	BEL (FL)	FRA	NL	NZ	SWI	UK	US	Certifications
as Chet Faker
Built on Glass	Released: 11 April 2014 (AU); Label: Future Classic, Opulent; Format: CD, LP, digital download	1	1	1	31	76	51	6	49	87	158	ARIA: Platinum
as Nick Murphy
Run Fast Sleep Naked	Released: 26 April 2019; Label: Downtown, Future Classic; Format: CD, LP, digital download	— (Note: Run Fast Sleep Naked did not enter the ARIA Albums Chart, but peaked at number 12 on the ARIA Digital Album Chart.)	—	7	—	—	—	—	—	—	—	
Music for Silence	Released: 6 March 2020; Label: Detail Records; Format: Digital download, streaming	—	—	—	—	—	—	—	—	—	—	
as Chet Faker
Hotel Surrender	Released: 16 July 2021 (AU); Label: Detail Records, BMG; Format: CD, digital download, streaming	19	—	—	—	—	—	—	—	—	—	
as Nick Murphy & the Program
Take in the Roses	Released: 10 December 2021 (AU); Label: Detail Records, BMG	—	—	—	—	—	—	—	—	—	—	
as Chet Faker
A Love for Strangers	Released: 13 February 2026; Label: Detail Records, BMG	65	—	—	—	—	—	—	—	—	—	
"—" denotes a recording that did not chart or was not released.

=== Live albums ===
List of live albums, with selected chart positions
Title	Album details	Peak chart positions	
Title	Album details	AUS	AUS Indie
Live Sessions	Released: 21 March 2013; Label: Self-released; Format: Digital download	—	—
18 Dec 2013 – Good Danny's Austin, TX	Released: 18 December 2013; Label: Daytrotter; Format: Digital download	—	—
iTunes Session	Released: 28 November 2014 (AU); Label: Future Classic; Format: Digital download	18	2

=== Extended plays ===
List of extended plays, with selected chart positions
Title	Album details	Peak chart positions				Certifications
Title	Album details	AUS	AUS Indie	US Dance	US Heat	Certifications
as Chet Faker
Thinking in Textures	Released: 23 March 2012; Label: Opulent, Remote Control; Format: CD, 12-inch vinyl, digital download	38	4	—	—	
Lockjaw EP (with Flume)	Released: 22 November 2013 (AU); Label: Future Classic; Format: CD, 12-inch vinyl, digital download	—	—	—	—	ARIA: 2× Platinum
Work (with Marcus Marr)	Released: 4 December 2015 (AU); Label: Detail; Format: 12-inch vinyl, Digital download	42	—	9	23	
as Nick Murphy
Missing Link	Released: 10 May 2017 (AU); Label: Future Classic; Format: CD, 12-inch vinyl, Digital download	—	5	21	—	
Cassette #1 (425 Made)	Released: 20 March 2020 (AU); Label: Detail Records; Format: Streamed audio, digital download	—	—	—	—	
Cassette #2 (350 Made)	Released: 5 June 2020 (AU); Label: Detail; Format: Digital download	—	—	—	—	
Cassette #3	Released: 14 December 2020 (AU); Label: Detail; Format: Digital download	—	—	—	—	
"—" denotes a recording that did not chart or was not released in that territory.

=== Singles ===
==== As lead artist ====
List of singles as lead artist, with year released, selected chart positions and certifications, and album shown
Title	Year	Peak chart positions										Certifications	Album
Title	Year	AUS	AUS Dance	AUS Indie	BEL (FL) Tip	CAN Rock	FRA	NZ	US Alt.	US AAA	US Dance	Certifications	Album
as Chet Faker
"Terms and Conditions"	2012	—	—	—	—	—	—	—	—	—	—		Thinking in Textures
"I'm into You"	2012	—	—	—	—	—	—	—	—	—	—		Thinking in Textures
"Love and Feeling"	2012	—	—	—	—	—	—	—	—	—	—		Thinking in Textures
"Drop the Game" (with Flume)	2013	—	—	—	—	—	125	—	—	—	—	ARIA: Platinum; BPI: Silver; RMNZ: 2× Platinum	Lockjaw EP
"Talk Is Cheap"	2014	6	2	2	53	—	—	—	—	—	—	ARIA: Platinum; RMNZ: Platinum	Built on Glass
"1998"	2014	55	16	6	71	—	95	—	—	—	—		Built on Glass
"Gold"	2014	40	5	5	51	17	—	—	32	—	—	MC: Gold; RMNZ: Platinum	Built on Glass
"Bend"	2015	48	11	2	—	—	—	—	—	—	—		Non-album singles
"1998" (featuring Banks)	2015	—	—	—	—	—	—	—	—	—	31	RMNZ: Gold	Non-album singles
"The Trouble with Us" (with Marcus Marr)	2015	8	1	1	9	—	—	31	—	—	47	ARIA: 2× Platinum; RMNZ: Platinum	Work
as Nick Murphy
"Fear Less"	2016	—	—	10	—	—	—	—	—	—	—		Non-album singles
"Stop Me (Stop You)"	2016	92	—	2	—	—	—	—	—	—	—		Non-album singles
"Medication"	2017	—	—	—	—	—	—	—	—	—	—		Non-album singles
"(Lover) You Don't Treat Me No Good" (Triple J Like a Version)	2018	—	—	—	—	—	—	—	—	—	—		Non-album singles
"Sanity"	2019	—	—	—	—	—	—	— (Note: "Sanity" did not enter the NZ Top 40 Singles Chart, but peaked at number 36 on the NZ Hot Singles Chart.)	—	—	—		Run Fast Sleep Naked
"Dangerous"	2019	—	—	—	—	—	—	—	—	—	—		Run Fast Sleep Naked
"Goodnight"	2020	—	—	—	—	—	—	—	—	—	—		Non-album singles
"Introvertts Paradise"	2020	—	—	—	—	—	—	—	—	—	—		Non-album singles
as Chet Faker
"Low"	2020	—	—	7	—	18	—	—	—	8	47		Hotel Surrender
"Get High"	2021	—	—	—	—	—	—	— (Note: "Get High" did not enter the NZ Top 40 Singles Chart, but peaked at number 12 on the NZ Hot Singles Chart.)	—	—	—		Hotel Surrender
"Whatever Tomorrow"	2021	—	—	—	—	—	—	— (Note: "Whatever Tomorrow" did not enter the NZ Top 40 Singles Chart, but peaked at number 26 on the NZ Hot Singles Chart.)	—	—	—		Hotel Surrender
"Feel Good"	2021	—	—	—	—	—	—	— (Note: "Feel Good" did not enter the NZ Top 40 Singles Chart, but peaked at number 25 on the NZ Hot Singles Chart.)	—	—	—		Hotel Surrender
"It's Not You"	2021	—	—	—	—	—	—	—	—	—	—		Hotel Surrender
as Nick Murphy and the Program
"Old Dog"	2021	—	—	—	—	—	—	—	—	—	—		Take in the Roses
as Chet Faker
"It Could Be Nice"	2022	—	—	—	—	—	—	—	—	—	—		Non-album singles
"Something Like This"	2023	—	—	—	—	—	—	—	—	—	—		Non-album singles
"I Wanna Try Something New"	2023	—	—	—	—	—	—	—	—	—	—		Non-album singles
"Far Side of the Moon"	2025	—	—	—	—	—	—	—	—	—	—		A Love for Strangers
"Inefficient Love"	2025	—	—	—	—	—	—	—	—	—	—		A Love for Strangers
"This Time for Real"	2025	—	—	—	—	—	—	—	—	13	—		A Love for Strangers
"Can You Swim?"	2025	—	—	—	—	—	—	—	—	—	—		A Love for Strangers
"Over You"	2026	—	—	—	—	—	—	— (Note: "Over You" did not enter the NZ Top 40 Singles Chart, but peaked at number 38 on the NZ Hot Singles Chart.)	—	—	—		A Love for Strangers
"—" denotes a recording that did not chart or was not released in that territory.

==== As featured artist ====
List of singles as featured artist, with selected chart positions
Title	Year	Peak chart positions	Album
Title	Year	BEL (FL) Tip	Album
"Kill the Doubt" (The Cactus Channel featuring Chet Faker)	2015	53	Non-album single

==== Promotional singles ====
List of promotional singles, with selected chart positions
Title	Year	Peak chart positions		Album
Title	Year	AUS	AUS Indie	Album
"Melt" (featuring Kilo Kish)	2013	60	4	Built on Glass

=== Other charted and certified songs ===
List of songs, with selected chart positions
Title	Year	Peak chart positions			Certifications	Album
Title	Year	AUS	AUS Dance	NZ Hot	Certifications	Album
"No Diggity"	2012	—	—	—	RMNZ: Platinum	Thinking in Textures
"Left Alone" (Flume featuring Chet Faker)	2012	—	—	—	RMNZ: Gold	Flume
"This Song Is Not About a Girl" (Flume and Chet Faker)	2013	52	12	—		Lockjaw EP
"What About Us" (Flume and Chet Faker)	2013	53	13	—		Lockjaw EP
"1000 Ways"	2026	—	—	29		A Love for Strangers
"—" denotes a recording that did not chart or was not released in that territory.

=== Other appearances ===
Title	Year	Album	Notes
"Mahal" (Ta-ku featuring Chet Faker)	2011	LATENYC	
"Fear Like You" (Chet Faker and The Royal Swazi Spa)	2012	The Key of Sea – Volume 2	
"Moon Plain" (The Coober Pedy University Band featuring Chet Faker)	2013	Moon Plain	
"Fool of Me" (Say Lou Lou featuring Chet Faker)	2013	Julian	
"Rock On" (Nkechi Anele and Chet Faker; David Essex cover)	2013	Non-album single	
"Try It Over" (Yujen)	2013	No Aware	Vocals
"On You" (Chet Faker and GoldLink)	2014	Non-album single	
"No Reason" (Bonobo and Nick Murphy)	2017	Migration	
"I Need" (KING SOL featuring Chet Faker)	2017	Winter Thoughts EP	
"Basic Needs" (Heathered Pearls featuring Nick Murphy)	2020	Non-album single	

==== Production ====
Title	Year	Artist	Album
"Don't Regret Me"	2012	Rainy Milo	Limey
"Deal Me Briefly"	2013	Rainy Milo	This Thing of Ours

==== Remixes ====
Title	Year	Artist
"So Sorry"	2011	Geoffrey O'Connor
"North"	2011	Phoenix
"Nude"	2011	Radiohead
"Trembling Hands"	2012	The Temper Trap
"Dark Doo Wop"	2012	MS MR
"Pretty Girls"	2015	Little Dragon
"1998" (Nick Murphy Remix)	2015	Chet Faker
"Remains (Vocal Dub)"	2015	Shlohmo
"Story"	2020	ame_no_parade

=== Music videos ===
==== As lead artist ====
Title	Year	Director(s)
"Terms and Conditions"	2011	Isabella Giovinazzo
"I'm into You"	2012	Josh Mckie
"Drop the Game" (Flume and Chet Faker)	2013	Lorin Askill
"Talk Is Cheap"	2014	Toby and Pete
"1998"	2014	Domenico Bartolo
"Gold"	2014	Hiro Murai
"The Trouble with Us" (Marcus Marr and Chet Faker)	2015	Kinopravda
"Feel Good"	2021	

==== As featured artist ====
Title	Year	Director(s)
"Left Alone" (Flume featuring Chet Faker)	2013	Rhett Wade-Ferrell
"No reason" (Bonobo feat. Nick Murphy)	2017	Oscar Hudson

== Awards and nominations ==
=== A2IM Libera Awards ===
Year	Nominee / work	Award	Result	R
2015	Chet Faker	Breakthrough Artist of the Year	Nominated	

=== AIR Awards ===
The Australian Independent Record Awards (commonly known informally as AIR Awards) is an annual awards night to recognise, promote and celebrate the success of Australia's Independent Music sector.

Year	Nominee / work	Award	Result	R
2012	Chet Faker	Best Independent Artist	Nominated	
2012	Chet Faker	Breakthrough Independent Artist	Won	
2012	Thinking in Textures	Best Independent Single/EP	Won	
2012	Thinking in Textures	Best Independent Dance/Electronica Album	Nominated	
2012	"Terms and Conditions"	Best Independent Dance/Electronica Single	Nominated	
2014	Chet Faker	Best Independent Artist	Nominated	
2014	Built on Glass	Best Independent Album	Nominated	
2014	Built on Glass	Best Independent Dance/Electronica Album	Nominated	
2015	Chet Faker	Best Independent Artist	Nominated	
2017	"Stop Me (Stop You)"	Best Independent Dance/Electronic Club Song or EP	Won	

=== APRA Awards (Australia) ===
The APRA Awards are presented annually from 1982 by the Australasian Performing Right Association (APRA) and Australasian Mechanical Copyright Owners Society (AMCOS).

Year	Nominee / work	Award	Result	R
2014	"Drop the Game" (with Flume)	Song of the Year	Shortlisted	
2015	"1998" (Chet Faker)	Song of the Year	Shortlisted	
2015	"Gold" (Chet Faker)	Song of the Year	Shortlisted	
2015	"Talk Is Cheap" (Chet Faker)	Song of the Year	Shortlisted	
2015	Chet Faker	Breakthrough Songwriter of the Year	Nominated	
2015	"Drop the Game" (with Flume)	Dance Work of the Year	Nominated	
2017	"The Trouble With Us" (with Marcus Marr)	Dance Work of the Year	Nominated	
2017	"The Trouble With Us" (with Marcus Marr)	Most Played Australian Work	Nominated	

=== ARIA Awards ===
Chet Faker received nine nominations at the ARIA Music Awards of 2014,

Year	Nominee / work	Award	Result
2014	Built on Glass	Album of the Year	Nominated
2014	Built on Glass	Best Male Artist	Won
2014	Built on Glass	Breakthrough Artist	Nominated
2014	Built on Glass	Best Independent Release	Won
2014	Built on Glass	Engineer of the Year (Engineer: Eric J Dubowsky)	Won
2014	Built on Glass	Producer of the Year (Producer: Nicholas Murphy)	Won
2014	Built on Glass	Best Cover Art (Art Director: Tin and Ed)	Won
2014	"Talk Is Cheap"	Best Video (Video Director: Toby and Pete)	Nominated
2014	"Drop the Game" (with Flume)	Best Dance Release	Nominated
2016	"The Trouble With Us (with Marcus Marr)"	Song of the Year	Nominated

=== Australian Music Prize ===
The Australian Music Prize (the AMP) is an annual award of $30,000 given to an Australian band or solo artist in recognition of the merit of an album released during the year of award. The AMP was established in 2005.

Year	Nominee / work	Award	Result
2014	Built on Glass	Australian Music Prize	Nominated

=== EG Awards / Music Victoria Awards ===
The EG Awards (known as Music Victoria Awards since 2013) are an annual awards night celebrating Victorian music. They commenced in 2006.

Year	Nominee / work	Award	Result
2012	"No Diggity"	Best Song	Nominated
2012	Chet Faker	Best Male	Nominated
2012	Chet Faker	Best New Talent	Nominated
2012	Chet Faker	Outstanding Achievement By a Victorian Artist	Nominated
2014	Chet Faker	Best Male	Nominated
2014	Chet Faker	Best Electronic Act	Won

=== J Award ===
The J Awards are an annual series of Australian music awards that were established by the Australian Broadcasting Corporation's youth-focused radio station Triple J. The J Awards were established in 2005.

Year	Nominee / work	Award	Result
2014	"Talk Is Cheap"	Australian Video of the Year	Nominated

=== Helpmann Awards ===
The Helpmann Awards is an awards show, celebrating live entertainment and performing arts in Australia, presented by industry group Live Performance Australia since 2001. Note: 2020 and 2021 were cancelled due to the COVID-19 pandemic.

Year	Nominee / work	Award	Result	Ref.
2015	Chet Faker – National Tour 2015	Best Australian Contemporary Concert	Won	

=== MTV Video Music Awards ===
Year	Nominee / work	Award	Result	R
2015	"Gold"	Best Choreography (Choreographer: Ryan Heffington)	Nominated	

=== Rolling Stone Australia Awards ===
The Rolling Stone Australia Awards are awarded annually in January or February by the Australian edition of Rolling Stone magazine for outstanding contributions to popular culture in the previous year.

Year	Nominee / work	Award	Result	Ref.
2012	Thinking in Textures	Best Independent Release	Won	
2021	"Low"	Best Single	Nominated	
