= Foreverlution =

Studio album by Thundamentals
- Released: 29 July 2011
- Recorded: 2011
- Genre: Australian hip hop
- Label: Obese Records
- Producer: DJ Morgs

Thundamentals chronology
Sleeping On Your Style (2009)	Foreverlution (2011)	So We Can Remember (2014)

Singles from Foreverlution
- 1. "Paint the Town Red" Released: September 2011; 2. "How You Been" Released: January 2012

Foreverlution is the second studio album by Australian hip hop group Thundamentals. It was released through Obese Records on 29 July 2011 and peaked at number 64 on the ARIA albums chart.

== Track listing ==
No.	Title	Writer(s)	Length
1.	"Holla"	MC Jeswon, MC Tuka	2:57
2.	"Busy with It"	Jeswon, Tuka	4:07
3.	"Calm In The Chaos" (featuring Charlotte Craib)	Jeswon, Tuka	4:08
4.	"Paint The Town Red"	Jeswon, Tuka	4:08
5.	"How You Been?" (featuring Jase Excell)	Jeswon, Tuka	3:40
6.	"Check My Fresh" (featuring Vida-Sunshyne)	Jeswon, Tuka	3:18
7.	"Burn It Down" (featuring Ray Mann)	Jeswon, Tuka	3:44
8.	"Wanna Be"	Jeswon, Tuka	4:00
9.	"Dimension 3"	Jeswon, Tuka	3:32
10.	"Thunda Cats" (featuring Dysphemic)	Jeswon, Tuka	4:37
11.	"Captains"	Jeswon, Tuka	3:57
12.	"Ankle Biters"	Jeswon, Tuka	3:36
13.	"Tell 'Em"	Jeswon, Tuka	3:13
14.	"Your Name"	Jeswon, Tuka	3:16
15.	"Easy"	Jeswon, Tuka	3:32

== Charts ==
Chart (2011)	Peak position
Australian Albums (ARIA)	64
