= Life Death Time Eternal =

Studio album by Tuka
- Released: 10 July 2015
- Recorded: 2015
- Genre: Australian hip hop
- Length: 54:45
- Label: EMI
- Producer: Tuka

Tuka chronology
Feedback Loop (2012)	Life Death Time Eternal (2015)	Nothing in Common But Us (2020)

Singles from Life Death Time Eternal
- 1. "Nirvana" Released: 6 March 2015; 2. "Tattoo" Released: 5 June 2015; 3. "My Star" Released: 2 September 2015

Life Death Time Eternal is the third studio album by Australian hip hop artist Tuka, released through EMI on 10 July 2015.

== Acoustic EP ==
On 18 March 2016, Tuka will release the Alive Death Time Eternal EP, which will contain live and acoustic versions of 6 tracks off the EP.

== Tours ==
On 23 October 2015, Tuka began his first ever headline tour, the Life Death Time Eternal Tour. On 1 April 2016, began the Don't Wait Up Tour.

== Awards ==
The album was nominated for Best Urban Album at the 2015 ARIA Awards.

== Track listing ==
No.	Title	Writer(s)	Producer(s)	Length
1.	"L.D.T.E."	Tuckerman; Daniel Clayton; James Heinz; Philip Norman	Countbounce; J57	4:47
2.	"Right by You"	Tuckerman; Alex Hope	Hope; Morgan James	3:48
3.	"Don’t Wait Up"	Tuckerman; Nic Martin; Matt Cenere	Martin	4:11
4.	"Tattoo"	Tuckerman; Kevin Kerr	Countbounce; Pon Cho	3:53
5.	"Nirvana"	Tuckerman; Hope	Countbounce; Hope	3:20
6.	"My Star"	Tuckerman; Hope	Countbounce; Hope	3:44
7.	"State of Mind"	Tuckerman; Norman; Brian Campeau	Countbounce; Campeau; Pon Cho	5:24
8.	"Everything"	Tuckerman; Clayton; Martin; Thom Crawford	Martin; Crawford; Pon Cho	4:37
9.	"Yeah Right"	Tuckerman; Clayton; Norman; Kerr	Countbounce; Pon Cho	3:47
10.	"You"	Tuckerman; Norman	Countbounce	4:48
11.	"Down for Whatever"	Tuckerman; Kerr	Countbounce; Pon Cho	4:08
Total length:				47:20

Deluxe edition
No.	Title	Writer(s)	Producer(s)	Length
12.	"My Love"	Tuckerman; Kerr; Crawford	Countbounce; Pon Cho	3:49
13.	"Live with It"	Tuckerman; Kerr; Martin	Martin; Pon Cho	3:49
14.	"All I Ever Wanted"	Tuckerman	Countbounce; Tuka	3:07
Total length:				57:20

== Charts ==
Chart (2015)	Peak position
Australian Albums (ARIA)	6
