= This Thing of Ours =

This Thing of Ours may refer to:

- American mafia
- Sicilian mafia
- This Thing of Ours (film), 2003 American film
- This Thing of Ours (album), 2013 Rainy Milo album
- This Thing of Ours (EP), 2021 The Alchemist EP
  - This Thing of Ours 2, 2021 sequel EP
