= J Awards of 2014 =

Annual Australian music awards

- Date: 18 November 2014
- Venue: Australia
- Website: abc.net.au/triplej

The J Award of 2014 is the tenth annual J Awards, established by the Australian Broadcasting Corporation's youth-focused radio station Triple J. The announcement comes at the culmination of Ausmusic Month (November). For the first time, the award for Double J Artist of the Year was announced. It was added to the three previous awards; Australian Album of the Year, Australian Music Video of the Year and Unearthed Artist of the Year.

The eligible period took place between November 2013 and October 2014. The winners were announced live on air on Triple J on Tuesday 18 November 2014.

== Awards ==
=== Australian Album of the Year ===
Artist	Album Title	Result
Chet Faker	Built on Glass	Won
sleepmakeswaves	love of cartography	Nominated
Seekae	The Worry	Nominated
Hilltop Hoods	Walking Under Stars	Nominated
King Gizzard & the Lizard Wizard	I'm in Your Mind Fuzz	Nominated
Thundamentals	So We Can Remember	Nominated
Flight Facilities	Down to Earth	Nominated
Ball Park Music	Puddinghead	Nominated
#1 Dads	About Face	Nominated
Total Control	Typical System	Nominated
Remi	Raw X Infinity	Nominated
The Preatures	Blue Planet Eyes	Nominated

=== Double J Artist of the Year ===
Artist	Result
Mia Dyson	Won
Kate Miller-Heidke	Nominated
Augie March	Nominated
Blank Realm	Nominated
Steve Smyth	Nominated
Caitlin Park	Nominated

=== Australian Video of the Year ===
Director	Artist and Song	Result
Sia Furler and Daniel Askill	Sia - "Chandelier"	Won
Toby & Pete	Chet Faker - "Talk Is Cheap"	Nominated
Darcy Prendergast and Andrew Goldsmith	Hudson and Troop - "Frameless"	Nominated
Mark Alston	Illy - "One For the City"	Nominated
Jason Galea	King Gizzard & the Lizard Wizard - "Hot Wax"	Nominated
Jack Peddey	Client Liaison - "Free of Fear"	Nominated

=== Unearthed Artist of the Year ===
Artist	Result
Meg Mac	Won
Ceres	Nominated
Coin Banks	Nominated
Japanese Wallpaper	Nominated
Airling	Nominated
UV Boi	Nominated
