= Lockjaw (EP) =

EP by Flume and Chet Faker
- Released: 22 November 2013
- Genre: Electronic
- Length: 13:02
- Label: Future Classic (FCL97)

Flume albums chronology
Flume (2012)	Lockjaw (2013)	Skin (2016)

Chet Faker chronology
Thinking in Textures (2012)	Lockjaw (2013)	Built on Glass (2014)

Singles from Lockjaw
- 1. "Drop the Game" Released: 18 November 2013

Lockjaw is an extended play (EP) by Australian musicians Flume and Chet Faker, released on 22 November 2013 by Future Classic.

== Background ==
Flume and Faker had previously worked together on the track "Left Alone" from Flume's 2012 album, Flume.

In September 2013, Flume announced that he and Faker had recorded an EP, stating that the final result "doesn't sound particularly like Flume or specifically like, you know, a Chet Faker record it really is kinda like a hybrid of both sounds going to one" and he feels like everything they did with the EP "was collaborative about the whole effort, and I think that shines through."

== Reception ==
Professional ratings
Review scores
Source	Rating
Consequence of Sound	C+
Pitchfork	7/10

Josh Dixon from Renowned for Sound gave the EP 4.5/5 stars, saying; "Each track though is clearly purposeful in its intent as a song and the EP stands strong and even goes as far as exceeding some of the overdrawn full-length albums seen today in the genre of electronic music. The EP will undoubtedly leave you wanting more."

Robin Fulton from On Record Magazine gave the EP 4/5 stars, writing; "The three track EP is an interesting cocktail of genre ambiguity with up and down tempo beats placed over harmonic, deep and emotion-fueled instrumentals carried along by Chet Faker’s responsive and perfectly layered vocals."

Samuel Hernadez of Quipmag felt that "On their Lockjaw EP, Flume and Chet Faker find a way to update your emotions, bringing creativity to vocals verging on the tearful."

Alim Kheraj of Planet Notion commented; "Lockjaw is a pure success. It manages to showcase what talents these two artists are. The obvious difficulty comes when trying to find the medium between the two. Fortunately, Lockjaw manages this. It's exciting to see something that could (and should) blossom and develop into a full album."

Alex Young of Consequence of Sound stated: "They have found a muse in each other, and as long as they stick to intertwining their sounds rather than trying to do something completely unfamiliar, there is seemingly plenty to be reaped from it." Young added, "The suggestion of a full album from this partnership would certainly be a welcome one."

== Singles ==
"Drop the Game" was promoted as the first official single from the EP. A video was released on 18 November 2013.

== Track listing ==
All tracks are written by Harley Streten and Nick Murphy

CD and digital download
No.	Title	Length
1.	"Drop the Game"	3:41
2.	"What About Us"	5:07
3.	"This Song Is Not About a Girl"	4:14
Total length:		13:02

== Commercial performance ==
In Australia, sales of the EP counted towards the single "Drop the Game", which peaked at No. 18 and was certified platinum. The two other tracks, when purchased independently of the EP, charted at Nos. 52 and 53 respectively in December 2013.

List of songs, with selected chart positions
Title	Peak chart positions	
Title	AUS	AUS Dance
"This Song Is Not About a Girl" (Flume and Chet Faker)	52	12
"What About Us" (Flume and Chet Faker)	53	13

== Certifications ==
Region	Certification	Certified units/sales
Australia (ARIA)	2× Platinum	140,000^{‡}
^{‡} Sales+streaming figures based on certification alone.
