= The Trouble with Us =

Single by Marcus Marr and Chet Faker

from the album Work
- Released: 16 October 2015
- Recorded: 2015
- Studio: South London
- Length: 3:42
- Label: Detail
- Songwriters: Marcus Marr; Nick Murphy

Marcus Marr singles chronology
"Brown Sauce" (2015)	"The Trouble with Us" (2015)

Chet Faker singles chronology
"Bend" (2015)	"The Trouble with Us" (2015)	"Fear Less" (2016)

"The Trouble with Us" is a song by English DJ Marcus Marr and Australian musician Chet Faker, released on 16 October 2015, as the lead single from their collaborative extended play (EP) Work.

== Background ==
Faker and Marr first connected via social media. In a media press, Marr explained Faker had posted one of his songs on Twitter. Marr messaged and thanked Faker and a conversation began. They exchanged song ideas and agreed to do something together. The pair met in Marr's South London recording studio in 2015 and recorded the 4-track EP in four days. "It was a real thrill as the songs came together," Marr said. "As far as working out lyrics and music, [Faker] is super-talented".

On 15 October 2015, "The Trouble with Us" received its world premiere on Triple J on Good Nights with Linda Marigliano, before being released the following day.

== Critical reception ==
Katie Cunningham from Inthemix described the song as an "intergalactic funk-tinged track".

Sally McMullen of Music Feeds described the song as being "fuelled by catchy hooks and a funk-flecked guitar riff, it's a fun-filled track that would be an absolute killer live".

== Music video ==
The music video, directed by Kinopravda and filmed in Korda Studios, was released on 10 December 2015.

== Charts ==
=== Weekly charts ===
Weekly chart performance for "The Trouble with Us"
Chart (2015–2016)	Peak position
Australia (ARIA)	8
Belgium (Ultratip Bubbling Under Flanders)	9
New Zealand (Recorded Music NZ)	31
US Dance/Electronic Songs (Billboard)	47

=== Year-end charts ===
Year-end performance for "The Trouble with Us"
Chart (2015)	Year-end position
Australia (ARIA)	99

== Certifications ==
Region	Certification	Certified units/sales
Australia (ARIA)	2× Platinum	140,000^{‡}
New Zealand (RMNZ)	Platinum	30,000^{‡}
^{‡} Sales+streaming figures based on certification alone.
