= Limey (mixtape) =

Mixtape by Rainy Milo
- Released: October 2012
- Genres: hip hop; jazz
- Producers: Oddisee; Daje; Chet Faker; BlkRssn; Flowzart; Cole M.G.N.; Eldad Guetta

Rainy Milo chronology
Limey (2012)	Black & Blonde (2013)

Limey is the debut mixtape by British recording artist Rainy Milo, released in October 2012 through an independent label. The mixtape is Milo's first body of work, released after Milo began singing with local musicians and arts collectives when she was fourteen. Rainy began surfing the internet for jazz-inspired hip-hop beats in which she found producer BLCK RSSN. Milo enlisted BLCK RSSN as a producer for the mixtape along with Oddisee, Daje, Chet Faker, Flowzart, Cole M.G.N. and Eldad Guetta.

Sonically the album featured hip hop and jazz genre's. All of the songs from the mixtape were written by Milo except "Come Up and See Me" which is a rendition of the 1975 song Make Me Smile (Come Up and See Me) by Steve Harley & Cockney Rebel. Upon release the mixtape was met with general acclaim with reviewers calling the mixtape a "perfect soundtrack" and praising its "chilly atmospherics and lyrics." Critics also praised Milo's vocals noting them as "startling" and "smoking".

Milo began promoting the mixtape on late 2012, she released a video to the song "Bout You" which was filmed in London and depicts Milo taking a "trip through her hometown". This was followed by a video for "Don't Regret Me" released in January 2013. The video sees Milo "caught in the wind."

== Background ==
"There was so little of that where I lived; an area which gave little hope to anyone, it's almost like they were told that they had a crappy fate and were willing to just go along with it."

— Milo, speaking on surrounding herself with inspiring people.

Milo started singing with local musicians and arts collectives when she was fourteen. During Milo's childhood, she tried to surround herself with inspiring people. Milo began surfing the internet for jazz-inspired hip-hop beats she could sing over, and through her searches she came across a beat by producer BLCK RSSN when she was fifteen. Milo recorded over the beat and the track became her debut recording entitled "Bout You", which she posted to Tumblr. The song later caught the attention of Gilles Peterson for his Brownswood Bubblers compilation series. Milo received various offers from record labels, but she turned them down, saying, "They were suggesting I work with people that just weren't right for me at all ... so I decided to just do my own thing and make music on my own so that I could go back and say, 'This is my sound, this is me.'" Milo then began working on first extended play entitled Limey, produced by Cole MGN in 2012. Limey featured collaborations with Chet Faker and Ariel Pink and a reinterpretation of Steve Harley & Cockney Rebel's "Make Me Smile (Come Up and See Me)", renamed "Come Up and See Me".

== Composition ==
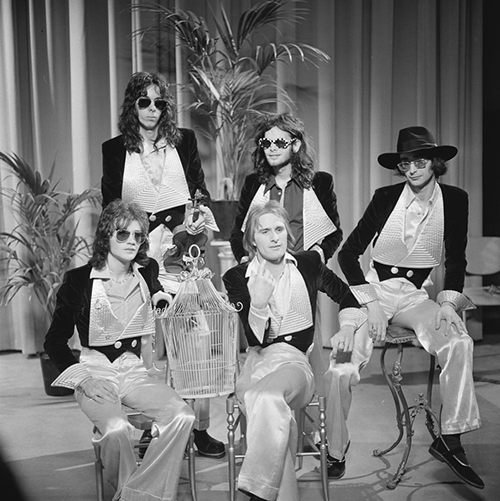
"Come Up and See Me" is a cover of Steve Harley & Cockney Rebel 1975 song Make Me Smile.

The opening song "The Other Way" is a hip-hop song, the music was produced by Oddisee and vocals and mixing were done by Daje The song was noted for having hip-hop influences from the likes of N*E*R*D and Tupac containing a rap-like flow. "Don't Regret Me" is the mixtape's second song produced by Chet Faker, Eldad Guetta and Daje. The song contains "atmospheric styling" and lyrically revolves around Millo begging an "ex-lover to not regret her and not forget her."

The third song from the mixtape entitled "Bout You" was produced by BlkRssn while vocal production and the song's mixing was handled by Flowzart. "Bout You" was noted as an "instant standout" track that contained "infectious vocals and laid-back, jazzy production" as well as being called a "chill, complementary backdrop."

The fourth song on the mixtape is a cover of Steve Harley & Cockney Rebel 1975 song, "Make Me Smile (Come Up and See Me)", the song's production was handled by Daje. The rendition is "slowed down" and creates a "haunting, moody R&B number". Reviewers called the song Milo's "most classic-sounding number" and showcases her "vocal abilities" and praised the drums helping "bring it up to date." "This Thing of Ours" is the album's final song and features production from Cole M.G.N., Eldad Guetta and Daje.

== Critical reception ==
The Guardian gave the mixtape general acclaim calling it the "perfect soundtrack for the impending cold winter nights", the reviews continued to praise the "chilly atmospherics and lyrics" noting that the mixtapes lyrics "sound as if they were written in the midst of a particularly painful breakup". The Guardian also gave positive reviews to Milo's vocals commenting "at the centre of it all is Milo's startling voice, which creaks and cracks with emotion." Harper's Bazaar called the mixtape "This is Our Jam" praising Milo's maturity and "smoky vocals", the magazine also praised the fact that Milo retained her "London accent" which they noted as "giving her music a raw and authentic edge". Harper's Bazaar compared Milo's mixtape to the work of Lily Allen, Adele, Rita Ora and Amy Winehouse. The magazine enjoyed the mixtape's "dreamy electro jazz beats and rhythms", noting her musical style is similar to Morcheeba and Zero Seven "with an added hip-pop overtone".

== Track listing ==
No.	Title	Writer(s)	Producer(s)	Length
1.	"The Other Way"	Rainy Milo	Oddisee; Daje	3:36
2.	"Don't Regret Me"	Rainy Milo	Chet Faker; Eldad Guetta; Daje	3:19
3.	"Bout You"	Rainy Milo	BlkRssn; Flowzart	2:35
4.	"Come Up and See Me"	Steve Harley	Daje	3:46
5.	"This Thing of Ours"	Rainy Milo	Cole M.G.N.; Eldad Guetta; Daje	3:32

Notes

- "Come Up and See Me" is a rendition of Steve Harley & Cockney Rebel song "Make Me Smile (Come Up and See Me)" (1975)

== Personnel ==
- Oddisee – music producer
- Daje – music producer, vocal producer and mixing
- Chet Faker – music producer
- Eldad Guetta – vocal producer
- BlkRssn – music producer
- Flowzart – vocals and mixing
- Cole M.G.N. – music producer
