= Missing Link (EP) =

EP by Nick Murphy
- Released: 9 May 2017
- Genre: Electronic
- Label: Future Classic

Nick Murphy chronology
Work (2015)	Missing Link (2017)	Run Fast Sleep Naked (2019)

Missing Link is an extended play (EP) by Australian musician Nick Murphy. It is the first musical collection to be released under his birth name. In a press release, Murphy said “Chet Faker was me trying to prove something to myself. But my tastes are pretty dynamic, and I realized I’ve spent time resisting that. Now I want to put everything in. It’s not conceptual anymore. It’s just me, and it made sense to show that in a name. It feels like a rediscovery.” Adding the Missing Link EP is “a bridge between what's out and what's coming”

== Track listing ==
Notes: All tracks written and produced by Nick Murphy, except for "Your Time", alongside Kaytranada.

No.	Title	Length
1.	"Your Time"	4:04
2.	"Bye"	1:31
3.	"I'm Ready"	4:23
4.	"Forget About Me"	6:46
5.	"Weak Education"	5:39

Japan bonus tracks
No.	Title	Length
6.	"In-Between"
7.	"Mania"
8.	"I Don't Want to Talk About It"

== Personnel ==
Credits adapted from the liner notes of Missing Link vinyl.

- Benjamin Gordon – artwork, visual direction
- Kaytranada – producer (track: 1)
- Mitchell McLennan – photography

== Release history ==
Region	Date	Label	Format	Ref.
Canada	9 May 2017	Opulent	Digital download	
United States	9 May 2017	Opulent	Digital download	
Australia	10 May 2017	Future Classic	Digital download	
Germany	10 May 2017	Future Classic	Digital download	
New Zealand	10 May 2017	Future Classic	Digital download	
United Kingdom	10 May 2017	Future Classic	Digital download	
United Kingdom	9 June 2017	Future Classic; PIAS	12-inch vinyl	
United States	16 June 2017	Downtown; Interscope	12-inch vinyl	
Japan	5 July 2017	Future Classic; Hostess	CD	

== Charts ==
Chart (2017)	Peak position
New Zealand Heatseekers Albums (RMNZ)	7
