= 1998 (Chet Faker song) =

Single by Chet Faker

from the album Built on Glass
- Released: 5 May 2014
- Recorded: 2013
- Length: 3:43 (video version); 6:05 (album version)
- Label: Future Classic
- Songwriter: Nick Murphy
- Producer: Nick Murphy

Chet Faker singles chronology
| "Talk Is Cheap" (2014) | "1998" (2014) | "Gold" (2014) |

Music video
- "1998" on YouTube

"1998" is the second single by Australian musician Chet Faker from his debut studio album Built on Glass (2014). The song was released in Australia as a digital download on 5 May 2014 through Future Classic. It was voted No. 8 on the Triple J Hottest 100, 2014.

A remix featuring Banks was released on 29 July 2015.

The song was shortlisted for Song of the Year at the APRA Music Awards of 2015.

== Music video ==
A music video to accompany the release of "1998" was first released on YouTube on 16 April 2014.

== Use in media ==
The song was used in the 2014 snowboarding film Shredbots: The Movie (director Leo Cittadella).

== Track listing ==
Digital download
| No. | Title | Length |
|---|---|---|
| 1. | "1998" | 3:43 |

Digital download – remixes
| No. | Title | Length |
|---|---|---|
| 1. | "1998" (album version) | 6:05 |
| 2. | "1998" (Reshaped by Homework) | 5:13 |
| 3. | "1998" (Roland Tings remix) | 6:47 |
| 4. | "1998" (NTEIBINT remix) | 4:44 |

Digital download and LP – Melbourne edition
| No. | Title | Length |
|---|---|---|
| 1. | "1998" (Nick Murphy remix) | 7:55 |
| 2. | "1998" (Andras Morning mix) | 5:14 |
| 3. | "1998" (Roland Tings remix) | 6:47 |
| 4. | "1998" (Otologic remix) | 7:17 |
| 5. | "1998" (Amateur Dance remix) | 5:22 |

Digital download – featuring Banks
| No. | Title | Length |
|---|---|---|
| 1. | "1998" (featuring Banks) | 3:44 |

== Charts ==
Chart performance for "1998"
| Chart (2014) | Peak position |
|---|---|
| Australia (ARIA) | 55 |
| Australian Independent Singles (AIR) | 6 |
| France (SNEP) | 95 |

Chart performance for "1998 (Remix featuring Banks)"
| Chart (2015) | Peak position |
|---|---|
| US Hot Dance/Electronic Songs (Billboard) Featuring Banks | 31 |

== Certifications ==
Certifications for "1998 (Remix featuring Banks)"
| Region | Certification | Certified units/sales |
|---|---|---|
| New Zealand (RMNZ) | Gold | 15,000^{‡} |
^{‡} Sales+streaming figures based on certification alone.

== Release history ==
| Region | Date | Format | Version | Label |
|---|---|---|---|---|
| Australia | 5 May 2014 | Digital download | Single version | Future Classic |
| Australia | 29 July 2015 | Digital download | Remix (featuring Banks) | Future Classic |
