= Thinking in Textures =

EP by Chet Faker
- Released: 23 March 2012
- Genres: Electronica; indie rock
- Length: 28:46
- Labels: Opulent; Remote Control
- Producer: Chet Faker

Chet Faker chronology
Thinking in Textures (2012)	Lockjaw (2013)

Thinking in Textures is the debut extended play (EP) by Australian musician Chet Faker. It was released on 23 March 2012 by Opulent and Remote Control Records.

The album won Best Independent Single/EP at the Australian Independent Records Awards.

== Track listing ==
All tracks are written by Chet Faker, except where noted.

Thinking in Textures — Standard edition
No.	Title	Length
1.	"I'm into You"	4:23
2.	"Terms and Conditions"	3:42
3.	"No Diggity" (Andre Young, Chauncey Hannibal, Teddy Riley, William Stewart, Lynise Walters, Richard Vick, Bill Withers)	3:41
4.	"Love and Feeling"	4:10
5.	"Cigarettes and Chocolate"	5:16
6.	"Solo Sunrise"	4:04
7.	"Everything I Wanted"	3:30
Total length:		28:46

Thinking in Textures — Japan bonus tracks
No.	Title	Length
8.	"Jeans and Wallet"	5:23
9.	"Terms and Conditions" (mabanua Remix)	4:01
10.	"Terms and Conditions" (Nicolas Jaar Remix)	6:20
Total length:		44:30

== Personnel ==
=== Technical ===
- Chet Faker — production
- Andrei Eremin — mastering

=== Visuals and imagery ===
- Christopher Doyle — art direction, design
- Jefton Sungkar — photography

== Charts ==
Chart (2014)	Peak position
Australian Albums (ARIA)	38
Australian Independent Label Albums	4

== Release history ==
Region	Date	Label	Format	Catalog
Australia	23 March 2012	Opulent; Remote Control	CD	OP001
Australia	23 March 2012	Opulent; Remote Control	Digital download	—
United Kingdom	1 April 2012	Chess Club	Digital download	—
United Kingdom	2 April 2012	Chess Club	12"	CC041
United States	22 May 2012	Downtown	Digital download	—
United States	19 June 2012	Downtown	12"	DWT70340
Japan	2 August 2013	P-Vine	Digital download	—
Japan	8 August 2012	P-Vine	CD	PCD-20196
