= Thundamentals =

Australian hip hop group

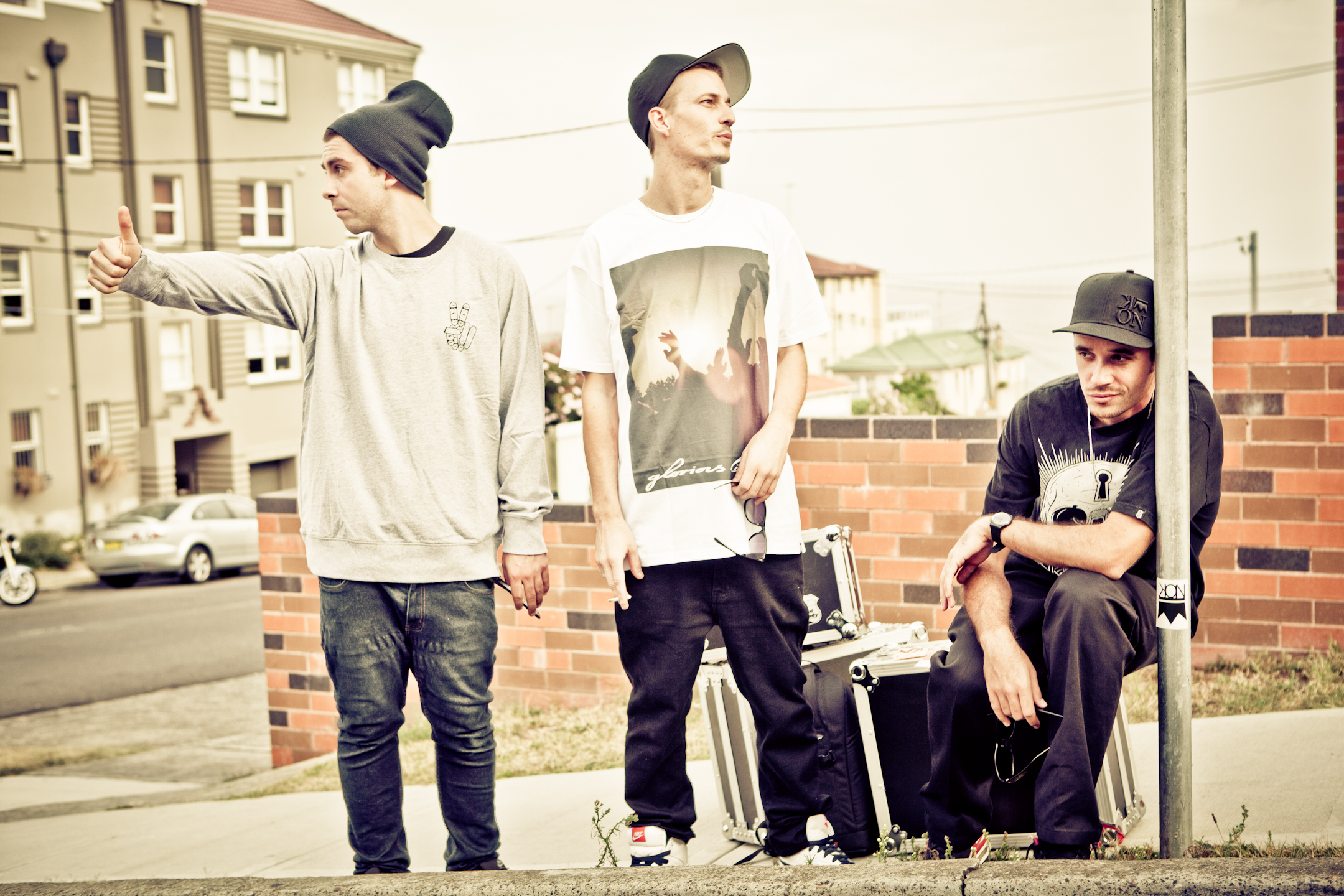

Background information
- Also known as: Connect 4
- Origin: Blue Mountains, New South Wales, Australia
- Genres: Australian hip hop
- Years active: 2008–present
- Labels: High Depth; Obese
- Members: Morgs (Morgan Jones); Jeswon (Jesse Ferris); Tuka (Brendan Tuckerman)
- Past members: Poncho (Kevin Kerr); Tommy Fiasko; MC Ruthless; DJ Clockwork
- Website: thundamentals.com.au

Thundamentals are an Australian hip hop group originating from the Blue Mountains region bordering the metropolitan area of Sydney. The members are currently Tuka, Jeswon, and Morgs. They have released five studio albums.

== History ==
=== Band origins: 2008–2010 ===
Before becoming Thundamentals, the band consisted of Morgan Jones, Tommy Fiasko, Jesse Ferris, MC Tuksnatch, MC Ruthless and DJ Clockwork, and was called Connect 4. Today, the group consists of Morgan Jones, Jesse Ferris, Brendan Tuckerman and Kevin Kerr. In 2009, they released their first album Sleeping On Your Style. DJ Lee Hartney from The Smith Street Band went to one band practice in 2009, but decided to give up his DJ career in favour of playing guitar. In 2010, Thundamentals featured at Festival First Night in Sydney.

In the Triple J Hottest 100, 2012, Thundamentals' Like a Version recording of fellow Australian Matt Corby's "Brother" came in at number 49. The original "Brother" placed number 3 the previous year in Triple J Hottest 100, 2011. In the Triple J Hottest 100, 2014, three of their tracks were voted into the countdown: "Something I Said", "Quit Your Job" and "Got Love". In December 2016 the group announced their new record label, High Depth. they also announced that their fourth studio album, Everyone We Know, would be released in February 2017 as the first release on the label produced by Dave Hammer. Thundamentals' track "Think About It" came in at number 82 on the Triple J Hottest 100, 2016. Their track "Sally" came in at number 8 on the Triple J Hottest 100, 2017.

== Discography ==
=== Studio albums ===
Title	Album details	Peak chart positions
Title	Album details	AUS
Sleeping on Your Style	Released: 18 September 2009; Label: Obese; Formats: CD, digital download	—
Foreverlution	Released: 29 July 2011; Label: Obese; Formats: CD, digital download	64
So We Can Remember	Released: 2 May 2014; Label: Obese; Formats: CD, digital download, vinyl	3
Everyone We Know	Released: 10 February 2017; Label: High Depth; Formats: CD, digital download, vinyl	2
I Love Songs	Released: 21 September 2018; Label: High Depth	9
All This Life	Released: 11 November 2022; Label: High Depth, Virgin	—

=== Live albums ===
Title	Details
Iso Tapes (Vol 1) (with Queensland Symphony Orchestra)	Released: 10 June 2020; Label: High Depth, Island, Universal Music Australia; Formats: Digital download, streaming
Iso Tapes (Vol 2) (with Queensland Symphony Orchestra)	Released: 29 July 2020; Label: High Depth, Island, Universal Music Australia; Formats: Digital download, streaming

=== Extended plays ===
Title	Details
Thundamentals	Released: 20 September 2008; Label: Obese; Formats: CD, digital download
iTunes Live from Sydney	Released: 15 December 2009; Label: Obese; Format: Digital download

=== Singles ===
List of singles released, with year released and album name shown
Title	Year	Peak chart positions	Certifications	Album
Title	Year	AUS	Certifications	Album
"Move It Up"	2009	—		Sleeping on Your Style
"Thunda"	2010	—		Sleeping on Your Style
"Paint the Town Red"	2011	—		Foreverlution
"How You Been" (featuring Jace Excell)	2012	—		Foreverlution
"Smiles Don't Lie"	2013	—	ARIA: Gold	So We Can Remember
"Something I Said" (featuring Thom Crawford)	2014	66	ARIA: Gold	So We Can Remember
"Quit Your Job"	2014	91		So We Can Remember
"Got Love" (featuring Solo)	2014	—		So We Can Remember
"Missing You"	2014	—		So We Can Remember
"Late Nights"	2016	97		Non-album single
"Never Say Never"	2016	—		Everyone We Know
"Think About It" (featuring Peta & The Wolves)	2016	93	ARIA: Platinum	Everyone We Know
"Ignorance Is Bliss"	2016	—		Everyone We Know
"Wolves"	2017		—	Everyone We Know
"Sally" (featuring Mataya)	2017	—	ARIA: 3× Platinum	Everyone We Know
"Déjà Vu"	2017	—		Everyone We Know
"I Miss You"	2018	—	ARIA: 2× Platinum	I Love Songs
"All I See Is Music"	2018	—		I Love Songs
"Everybody but You"	2018	—	ARIA: Platinum	I Love Songs
"Eyes on Me"	2019	—	ARIA: Gold	I Love Songs
"Catch Me If You Can" (featuring Eves Karydas)	2019	—		I Love Songs
"All I See"/"Sally" (live)	2020	—		Iso Tapes (Vol 2)
"Top of the World"	2022	—		All This Life
"—" denotes releases that did not chart or were not released.

List of singles released as featured artist
Title	Year	Peak chart positions	Certifications	Album
Title	Year	AUS	Certifications	Album
"Rattling the Keys to the Kingdom" (Hilltop Hoods featuring Thundamentals)	2012	64	ARIA: Gold	Drinking from the Sun

=== Music videos ===
Title	Year
"Move It Up"	2009
"Thunda"	2010
"Paint the Town Red"	2011
"How You Been" (featuring Jace Excell)	2012
"My Favourite Song"	2012
"Rattling the Keys to the Kingdom" (Hilltop Hoods)	2012
"Smiles Don't Lie"	2013
"Noodle Soup"	2013
"#YearOfTheThundakat" (with Geedo Co.)	2014
"Something I Said" (featuring Thom Crawford)	2014
"Quit Your Job"	2014
"Got Love" (featuring Solo)	2014
"Missing You"	2014
"Late Nights with Thundamentals"	2016
"Never Say Never"	2016
"Think About It" (featuring Peta & The Wolves)	2016
"Wolves"	2017
"Sally" (featuring Mataya)	2017
"Milk and Honey"	2017
"Deja Vu"	2017
"My Friends Say" (featuring Wallace)	2018
"I Miss You"	2018
"All I See Is Music"	2018
"Everybody But You"	2018
"Eyes On Me"	2019
"Catch Me If You Can" (featuring Eves Karydas)	2019

=== Guest appearances ===
Year	Song	Album
2008	"Payday" (The Tongue featuring Thundamentals)	Redux
2008	"Timeless" (Dialectrix featuring Thundamentals)	Cycles of Survival
2008	"Jack n the Box" (Two Toes featuring Thundamentals & Dialectrix)	Cooking with Caustic
2010	"Make Mine" (Crate Creeps featuring Thundamentals)	It's About That Time
2012	"Brother" (originally by Matt Corby)	Like a Version Eight
2012	"Better Alive" (The Herd featuring Thundamentals & Sky'High)	Better Alive EP
2012	"All the Above" (Illy featuring Thundamentals)	Bring It Back
2012	"Thunda Heights High"	Summer Heights High – Remixes
2013	"Just You Wait" (The Tongue featuring Thundamentals & Ngaiire)	Surrender to Victory
2014	"Modern Day Messenger" (Daily Meds featuring Thundamentals)	Sour Milk
2015	"Cosby Sweater (Jaytee remix)" (Hilltop Hoods featuring K21 & Thundamentals)	The Cold Night Sky

== Awards and nominations ==
=== AIR Awards ===
The Australian Independent Record Awards (commonly known informally as AIR Awards) is an annual awards night to recognise, promote and celebrate the success of Australia's Independent Music sector.

Year	Nominee / work	Award	Result
2014	So We Can Remember	Best Independent Hip Hop/Urban Album	Nominated

=== J awards ===
The J Awards are an annual series of Australian music awards that were established by the Australian Broadcasting Corporation's youth-focused radio station Triple J. They commenced in 2005.

Year	Nominee / work	Award	Result
2013	"Smiles Don't Lie"	Australian Video of the Year	Nominated
2014	So We Can Remember	Australian Album of the Year	Nominated
2017	Everyone We Know	Australian Album of the Year	Nominated
