= Talk Is Cheap (song) =

Single by Chet Faker

from the album Built on Glass
- Released: 11 February 2014
- Recorded: 2013
- Genre: Trip hop
- Length: 3:38
- Label: Future Classic
- Songwriter: Nick Murphy
- Producer: Nick Murphy

Chet Faker singles chronology
| "Drop the Game" (2013) | "Talk Is Cheap" (2014) | "1998" (2014) |

"Talk Is Cheap" is a song by Australian musician Chet Faker, released through Future Classic on 11 February 2014 as the lead single from his debut studio album Built on Glass (2014). It was voted number one on Australian youth broadcaster Triple J's Hottest 100 of 2014 and received a nomination for Australian Video of the Year at the 2014 J Awards. In 2025, the song placed 61 on the Triple J Hottest 100 of Australian Songs.

The song was shortlisted for Song of the Year at the APRA Music Awards of 2015.

== Commercial performance ==
"Talk Is Cheap" debuted on the ARIA Singles Chart at number 82 on 17 February 2014 and peaked at number 34 two weeks later. After his live performance at the ARIA Music Awards of 2014 on 26 November 2014, the song reached a new peak of 31. On 26 January 2015, the song was voted number one on radio station Triple J's Hottest 100 of 2014 and following this achievement, "Talk Is Cheap" reached a new peak of number 6. The song has been certified Platinum by the Australian Recording Industry Association for shipments exceeding 70,000 copies.

== Music video ==
A music video to accompany the release of "Talk Is Cheap" was first released on YouTube on 11 February 2014 at a total length of three minutes and thirty-nine seconds. Directed by Toby & Pete, it was nominated for Best Video at the ARIA Music Awards of 2014, but lost to "Chandelier" by Sia.

== Track listing ==
Digital download
| No. | Title | Length |
|---|---|---|
| 1. | "Talk Is Cheap" | 3:38 |

== Charts ==
=== Weekly charts ===
| Chart (2014–15) | Peak position |
|---|---|
| Australia (ARIA) | 6 |
| Australian Independent Singles (AIR) | 2 |
| Belgium (Ultratip Bubbling Under Flanders) | 53 |

=== Year-end charts ===
| Chart (2014) | Position |
|---|---|
| Australian Artist Singles (ARIA) | 32 |
| Chart (2015) | Position |
| Australia (ARIA) | 76 |

== Certifications ==
| Region | Certification | Certified units/sales |
|---|---|---|
| Australia (ARIA) | Platinum | 70,000^{^} |
| New Zealand (RMNZ) | Platinum | 30,000^{‡} |
^{^} Shipments figures based on certification alone.^{‡} Sales+streaming figures based on certification alone.

== Release history ==
| Region | Date | Format | Label |
|---|---|---|---|
| Australia | 11 February 2014 | Digital download | Future Classic |
