= Rainy Milo =

British recording artist (born 1995)

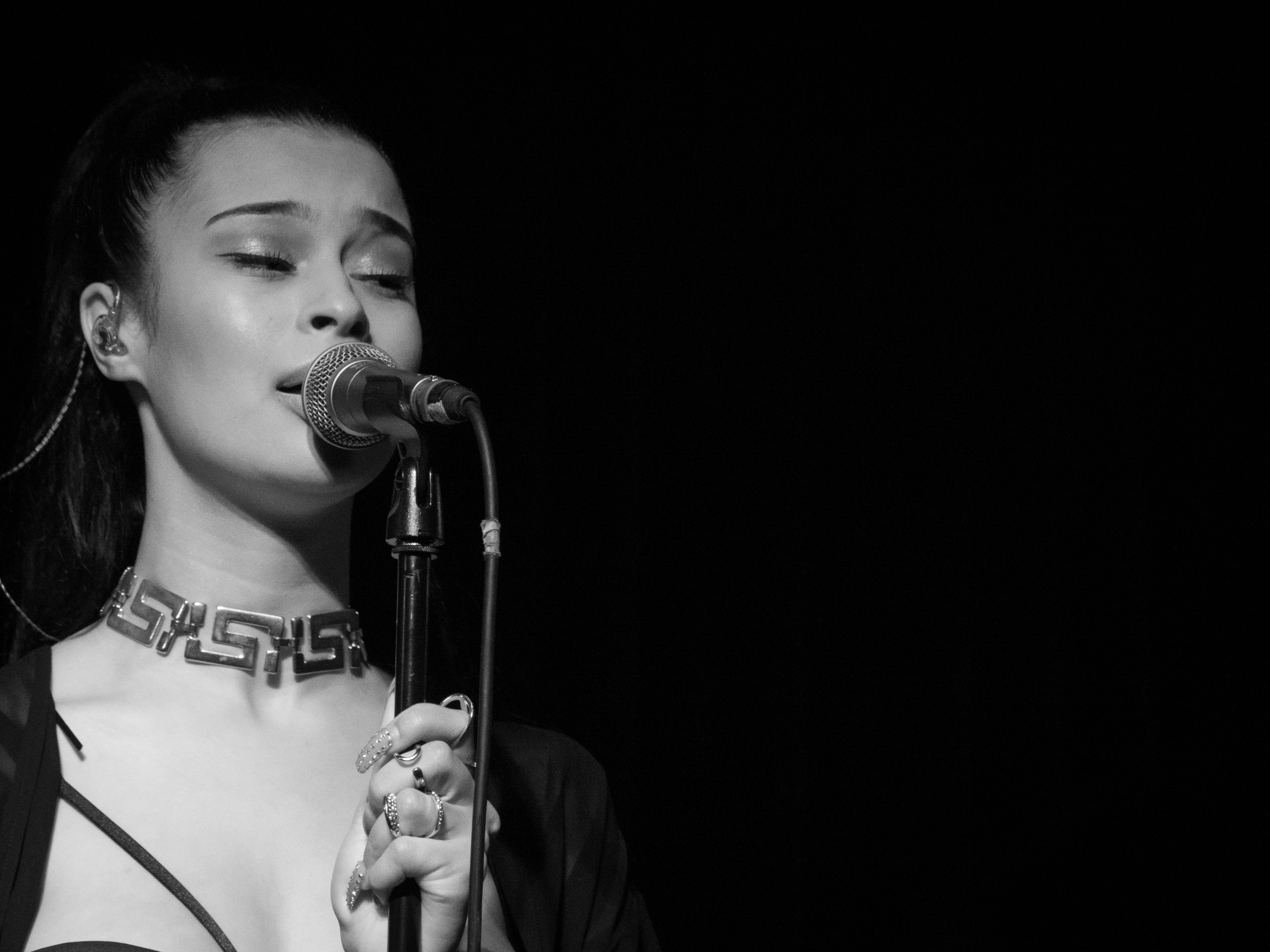

Background information
- Born: 12 November 1995 (age 30); London, England
- Genres: Hip hop; jazz; alternative R&B
- Occupation: Singer-Songwriter
- Instrument: Vocals
- Label: Limey / Virgin EMI Records
- Website: rainymilo-official.co.uk

Rainy Milo is a British recording artist, born in south-east London; she began her career singing with local musicians and arts collectives when she was 14. In 2012 Milo released her debut mixtape "Limey" which contained "jazz-inspired hip-hop" production, this was followed by Milo's debut EP entitled "Black & Blonde" which was released in April 2013. Most recently, Milo released her debut album "This Thing Of Ours" in April 2015 in the US via Limey/Big Picnic Records.

== Early life ==
Milo was born in south-east London of British and Guyanese descent. During Milo's childhood she tried to surround herself with inspiring people, Milo started singing with local musicians and arts collectives when she was 14. "There was so little of that where I lived; an area which gave little hope to anyone, it's almost like they were told that they had a crappy fate and were willing to just go along with it." Milo went to Harris Academy South Norwood until the end of year 9 when she went on to study musical theatre at the BRIT School.

== Career ==
=== Early releases ===
Milo began surfing the internet for jazz-inspired hip-hop beats she could sing over, whilst surfing the internet she came across a beat by producer BLCK RSSN. Milo recorded over the beat and the track became her debut recording entitled "Bout You", the song caught the attention of Gilles Peterson for his "Brownswood Bubblers Eight" compilation series. Milo received various offers from record labels but turned them down as she felt it was too early. Milo began working on her first EP entitled Limey, produced by Cole MGN. Limey featured collaborations with Chet Faker and Ariel Pink and a reinterpretation of Steve Harley & Cockney Rebel's "Make Me Smile (Come Up and See Me)", renamed "Come Up and See Me". MOBO awards tipped Milo as a nominee for an award.

In April, 2013 Milo released the video for the lead single "Bankrobber", from her EP Black & Blonde. The song is a cover of The Clash's 1980 single with R&B influences. The EP was released 26 April 2013 through Limey / Virgin EMI Records and featured three songs. On 22 July 2013 Milo released a song entitled "Deal Me Briefly" along with an accompanying video. The production for the song was handled by Chet Faker and was described as "futuristic". "Deal Me Briefly" was released to iTunes on 1 August 2013.

=== 2014: This Thing of Ours ===
Milo released her debut, full-length album on 3 March 2014 in the UK via Limey/Virgin EMI.

=== 2015: This Thing of Ours ===
Milo released her debut, full-length album in April 2015 in the US via Limey/Big Picnic Records. It is called "This Thing Of Ours".

== Artistry ==
"I’m mainly influenced by real life, I find myself being most honest about how I really think and feel about things that have gone on when I’m writing a song, I have no conventional process to writing any of my songs I never force a song out of myself because I never want to have a song that’s pointless, I only ever write and sing about things I mean and care about. I don’t want to ever sing something I don’t mean."

— Milo, speaking on her writing style.

Milo's vocals have been described as "sultry vibrato tones" with a "London accent ring" stunning voice, and beats infused with trip hop. Her style for her first EP, Limey, was described as having "charmingly-crooned vocals and jazz-funk infusion" "Limey" contained "jazz-inspired hip-hop" beats.

Milo cites "real life" as her main starting point when it comes to writing music; she has described her writing method as having "no conventional process". Her writing process is not "forced" and Milo says it usually begins while she is traveling in which she will "write a line here and there" which is followed by a producer sending her a "beat" the Milo returns to the line and begins writing and expanding it.

Milo's production is inspired by artists such as Kid Cudi and N.E.R.D, as well as her reggae-DJing grandfather. She grew up listening to her mother's jazz music which has been one of her biggest musical influences, saying "I’m instantly attracted to music with some kind of Jazz element to it, but I also think the fact that even my mum never played only one genre in the house rubbed off onto me, I don’t want to have just one sound in my music when there’s so many other genres that inspire me." Milo is inspired by Corinne Bailey Rae and Amy Winehouse, and the way they convey their emotions. She was influenced by producer and singer Pharrell, and cites his use of a mixture of genres as a major influence, praising his ability to mix "rock with psychedelic-sounding stuff and R&B".

== Discography ==
=== Extended plays ===
Title	Details
Black & Blonde	Released: 26 April 2013; Label: Limey, Virgin EMI; Format: Digital download

=== Mixtapes ===
Title	Details
Limey	Released: 2012; Label: Independent; Format: Free download

=== Singles ===
Title	Year	Album
Deal Me Briefly	2013	Non album single
Rats	2013	Non album single

=== Albums ===
Title	Details
This Thing of Ours	Release Date: 3 March 2014 (UK); Label: Limey, Virgin EMI; Format: Physical, Digital download
This Thing of Ours	Release Date: 21 April 2015 (US); Label: Limey, Big Picnic Records; Format: Digital download
