= Work (EP) =

EP by Marcus Marr and Chet Faker
- Released: 4 December 2015
- Recorded: 2015, South London
- Length: 22:12
- Label: Detail

Chet Faker chronology
iTunes Session (2014)	Work (2015)	Missing Link (2017)

Singles from Work
- 1. "The Trouble with Us" Released: 16 October 2015

Work is an extended play (EP) by English DJ Marcus Marr and Australian musician Chet Faker. The EP was recorded over a period of four days at Marr's studio following initial collaboration on Twitter.

== Reviews ==
Sally McMullen of Music Feeds said "Work is a symmetry of two sonic worlds that usually keep their distance. The fusion of electro beats and soulful indie pop vocals makes for a combination that is challenging, compelling and easy on the ears."

== Singles ==
"The Trouble with Us" was promoted as the first single from the EP and was released on 16 October 2015.

== Track listing ==
All tracks are written by Marcus Marr and Nick Murphy.

Digital download
No.	Title	Length
1.	"Birthday Card"	7:46
2.	"The Trouble with Us"	3:42
3.	"Learning for Your Love"	6:30
4.	"Killing Jar"	7:16
Total length:		22:12

== Commercial performance ==
In Australia, the EP debuted at number 42.

Chart (2015)	Peak position
Australia (ARIA)	42
