= So We Can Remember =

Studio album by Thundamentals
- Released: 2 May 2014
- Recorded: 2014
- Genre: Australian hip hop
- Length: 54:45
- Label: Obese
- Producer: DJ Morgs

Thundamentals chronology
Foreverlution (2011)	So We Can Remember (2014)	Everyone We Know (2017)

Singles from So We Can Remember
- 1. "Smiles Don't Lie" Released: 26 July 2013; 2. "Something I Said (featuring Thom Crawford)" Released: 28 February 2014; 3. "Quit Your Job" Released: 26 June 2013; 4. "Got Love (featuring Solo)" Released: 23 October 2014; 5. "Missing You" Released: 26 November 2014

So We Can Remember is the fourth studio album by Australian hip hop group Thundamentals, released through Obese Records on 2 May 2014. It peaked at No. 3 on the ARIA Albums Chart. It produced five singles and one promotional single, "Noodle Soup".

At the J Awards of 2014, the album was nominated for Australian Album of the Year.

== Chart performance ==
The album debuted at number 3 on the Australian album charts, and spent another four weeks in the charts. It also debuted at number 1 on the ARIA urban charts.

== Track listing ==
So We Can Remember track listing
No.	Title	Writer(s)	Length
1.	"Home in Your Head" (featuring Mataya)	MC Jeswon, MC Tuka	4:56
2.	"Smiles Don't Lie"	Jeswon, Tuka	4:02
3.	"Quit Your Job"	Jeswon, Tuka, Jake Stone	3:18
4.	"Something I Said" (featuring Thom Crawford)	Jeswon, Tuka	3:29
5.	"Much About Much"	Jeswon, Tuka	4:36
6.	"The Groundhog Song"	Jeswon, Tuka	4:41
7.	"Elephant in the Room"	Jeswon, Tuka	4:21
8.	"Hearts" (featuring Ev Jones)	Jeswon, Tuka	3:58
9.	"Noodle Soup"	Jeswon, Tuka	4:15
10.	"Ghosts in the Shell" (featuring Steve Clisby)	Jeswon, Tuka	6:07
11.	"Missing You"	Jeswon, Tuka	3:28
12.	"Got Love" (featuring Solo of Horrorshow)	Jeswon, Tuka, Solo	3:59
13.	"So We Can Remember" (featuring Laneous)	Jeswon, Tuka	3:29
14.	"#YearOfTheThundakat" (Bonus track)
Total length:			54:45

== Charts ==
Chart performance for So We Can Remember
Chart (2014)	Peak position
Australian Albums (ARIA)	3
Australian Urban Albums (ARIA)	1
