= Black and Blonde =

Black & Blonde

EP by Rainy Milo
- Released: 26 April 2013
- Genre: Hip hop; jazz
- Length: 9:34
- Label: Limey Virgin EMI
- Producer: Daje; Eldad Guetta; Cole M.G.N.

Rainy Milo chronology
Limey (2012)	Black & Blonde (2013)	This Thing of Ours (2014)

Black and Blonde stylized as Black & Blonde is the debut extended play by British recording artist Rainy Milo, released on 22 April 2013. It was her first work released under her contract with Universal Music, and followed her acclaimed mixtape Limey (2012).

Sonically the EP features hip hop, alternative and jazz genres. All the songs were written by Milo except "Bankrobber", which is a rendition of the 1980 song of the same name by English punk rock band The Clash. The EP also includes "Don't Regret Me" from her previous mixtape. The promotional video for "Bankrobber" includes scenes of Milo robbing a bank and a mug shot.

In support of the EP, Milo performed shows in May 2013 at Cargo in London, Field Day festival, Brighton and Bristol.

== Background ==
"There was so little of that where I lived; an area which gave little hope to anyone, it's almost like they were told that they had a crappy fate and were willing to just go along with it."

— Milo, speaking on surrounding herself with inspiring people.

Milo started singing with local musicians and arts collectives when she was fourteen. While searching for jazz-inspired hip-hop beats she could sing over, she came across a beat by producer BLCK RSSN. This became the basis for her debut recording "Bout You", which caught the attention of Gilles Peterson for his Brownswood Bubblers compilation series. Milo received various offers from record labels but turned them down as she felt it was too early. Her first mixtape, Limey, produced by Cole MGN, was released in October 2012 and gained significant acclaim. In March 2013 she signed a recording contract with Mercury and Universal and began working on her debut EP.

== Composition ==
The opening track, "Bankrobber", is a cover of The Clash's 1980 single of the same name. It contains "rough sultry vocals and R&B influences". Critics praised the song's "rich honeyed tones" and "super smooth interpretation of The Clash." Milo commented that she had added a "Milo twist" to it.

"Don't Regret Me" was also included as the second song on Milo's previous mixtape, produced by Chet Faker, Eldad Guetta and Daje. It contains "atmospheric styling" and lyrically revolves around Millo begging an "ex-lover to not regret her and not forget her."

== Reception ==
Critics praised the EP, commenting that "It’s likely, indeed, that her colourful sounds will be swirling through the airwaves before long".

== Track listing ==
No.	Title	Writer(s)	Producer(s)	Length
1.	"Bankrobber"	Joe Strummer; Mick Jones		3:03
2.	"Are You Sure"	Rainy Milo		3:14
3.	"Don't Regret Me"	Rainy Milo	Cole M.G.N.; Eldad Guetta; Daje	3:17

== Personnel ==
- Daje - vocals and mixing
- Eldad Guetta - vocal producer
- Cole M.G.N. - music producer

== Release history ==
Region	Date	Format	Label
United Kingdom	26 April 2013	Online/download	Universal Records
