= Gold (Chet Faker song) =

Single by Chet Faker

from the album Built on Glass
- Released: 2 June 2014
- Recorded: 2013–14
- Genre: Electronica; downtempo
- Length: 4:45
- Label: Future Classic
- Songwriter: Nick Murphy
- Producer: Nick Murphy

Chet Faker singles chronology
"1998" (2014)	"Gold" (2014)	"Bend" (2015)

Music video
- "Gold" on YouTube

"Gold" is the third single by Australian musician Chet Faker from his debut studio album, Built on Glass (2014). The song was released in Australia as a digital download on 2 June 2014, by Future Classic. It was voted number seven on the Triple J Hottest 100, 2014. The song was scored for the "New MacBook – Reveal" video during the Apple Watch Event on 9 March 2015.

The song was shortlisted for Song of the Year at the APRA Music Awards of 2015.

== Music video ==
A music video to accompany the release of "Gold" was first released on YouTube on 12 August 2014 at a total length of four minutes and nineteen seconds. The video was directed by Hiro Murai and choreographed by Ryan Heffington. The skating and camera shots are done using practical effects created by driving down a road near Acton, California, shot in one night between sunset and sunrise. Post production consisted of stitching together a total of four shots to look continuous. The roller skaters featured in the video are Candice Heiden, April Corley, and Appelusa McGlynn.

== Live performances ==
Faker performed "Gold" live on The Ellen DeGeneres Show on 7 January 2015, marking his first performance on the American television talk show.

== Track listing ==
Digital download
No.	Title	Length
1.	"Gold"	4:45
2.	"Gold" (Flume rework)	4:27

== Charts ==
Chart (2014)	Peak position
Australia (ARIA)	40
Australian Independent Singles (AIR)	5
Belgium (Ultratip Bubbling Under Flanders)	51
US Alternative Airplay (Billboard)	32

== Certifications ==
Region	Certification	Certified units/sales
Canada (Music Canada)	Gold	40,000^{‡}
New Zealand (RMNZ)	Platinum	30,000^{‡}
^{‡} Sales+streaming figures based on certification alone.

== Release history ==
Region	Date	Format	Label
Australia	2 June 2014	Digital download	Future Classic

== See also ==
- Video for 1980 song Skateaway by Dire Straits featured one female roller-skater
