= Carmada =

Australian electronic music project

- Origin: Australia
- Labels: Owsla; Audiopaxx; Mad Decent; Insomniac Records
- Members: Max Armata
- Past members: Drew Carmody

Carmada is an electronic music project by Australian record producer Yahtzel (Max Armata), and formerly a duo with record producer L D R U (Drew Carmody). Their debut single, "Maybe" was certified Gold in Australia in 2015.

== Discography ==
=== Extended plays ===
| Title | Details |
|---|---|
| Realise | Released: 5 December 2014; Label: AudioPaxx; Formats: Digital download |

=== Singles ===
List of singles, with year released and certifications shown
| Title | Year | Certifications | Album |
|---|---|---|---|
| "Maybe" | 2014 | ARIA: Gold | Realise |
| "Realise" (featuring Noah Slee) | 2014 | | Realise |
| "On Fire" (featuring Maribelle) | 2015 | | Realise |
| "Embrace" (with NGHTMRE & Xavier Dunn) | 2017 | | Non-album singles |
| "Ready for It" (featuring tribes) | 2018 | | Non-album singles |
| "Lay it Down" (featuring Georgi Kay) | 2018 | | Non-album singles |

=== Remixes ===
| Year | Track | Artist | Label |
|---|---|---|---|
| 2015 | "Doing It" | Charli XCX | Atlantic Records |
| 2015 | "Be Together" | Major Lazer | Mad Decent |
| 2018 | "Right Here, Right Now" | Fatboy Slim | Astralwerks |
