= Built on Glass =

Studio album by Chet Faker
- Released: 11 April 2014
- Studio: North Melbourne Meat Market Studio
- Genre: Electronic; R&B; soul
- Length: 51:25
- Label: Future Classic; Opulent
- Producer: Nick Murphy

Chet Faker chronology
Lockjaw (2013)	Built on Glass (2014)	iTunes Session (2014)

Singles from Built on Glass
- 1. "Talk Is Cheap" Released: 17 February 2014; 2. "1998" Released: 5 May 2014; 3. "Gold" Released: 2 June 2014

Built on Glass is the debut studio album by Australian electronic musician Chet Faker. It was released on 11 April 2014 on the Future Classic label to generally favourable reviews.

At the J Awards of 2014, the album won Australian Album of the Year.

== Critical reception ==
Professional ratings
Aggregate scores
Source	Rating
AnyDecentMusic?	7.0/10
Metacritic	75/100
Review scores
Source	Rating
AllMusic	4/5 stars
The A.V. Club	B
DIY	4/5 stars
The Irish Times	3/5 stars
NME	6/10
Now	4/5
Pitchfork	7.3/10
Uncut	6/10

Built on Glass received generally positive reviews from music critics. At Metacritic, which assigns a normalised rating out of 100 to reviews from mainstream critics, the album holds an average score of 75, indicating "generally favorable reviews".

== Track listing ==
All tracks are written by Nick Murphy.

Built on Glass – Standard edition
No.	Title	Length
1.	"Release Your Problems"	3:12
2.	"Talk Is Cheap"	3:38
3.	"No Advice" (Airport version)	1:45
4.	"Melt" (featuring Kilo Kish)	4:10
5.	"Gold"	4:45
6.	"To Me"	5:14
7.	"/"	0:18
8.	"Blush"	4:47
9.	"1998"	6:05
10.	"Cigarettes & Loneliness"	7:52
11.	"A Lesson in Patience"	5:45
12.	"Dead Body"	3:54

Built on Glass – Japan redeemable download track
No.	Title	Length
1.	"Kill Switch"	2:59

== Personnel ==
Credits adapted from booklet.

Performance

- Nick Murphy – performer
- CLEOPOLD – guitar solo (track 12)

Visuals and imagery

- Tin and Ed – art direction, photography

Technical and production

- Nick Murphy – production, recording
- Eric J Dubowsky – mixing
- Brian Lucey – mastering

== Tours ==
=== Built on Glass Tour ===
Date	City	Country	Venue
Australia
12 June 2014	Geelong	Australia	The Wool Exchange
13 June 2014	Melbourne	Australia	Forum Theatre
14 June 2014	Melbourne	Australia	Forum Theatre
19 June 2014	Perth	Australia	The Astor Theatre
21 June 2014	Brisbane	Australia	The Tivoli
22 June 2014	Sunshine Coast	Australia	Lake Kawana Community Centre
24 June 2014	Port Macquarie	Australia	Glasshouse Theatre
25 June 2014	Newcastle	Australia	Newcastle Civic Theatre
26 June 2014	Sydney	Australia	Enmore Theatre
27 June 2014	Sydney	Australia	Enmore Theatre
28 June 2014	Wollongong	Australia	Anita's Theatre
3 July 2014	Adelaide	Australia	HQ
4 July 2014	Hobart	Australia	Odeon Theatre

=== National tour ===
Date	City	Country	Venue
Australia
11 February 2015	Canberra	Australia	Royal Theatre
13 February 2015	Sydney	Australia	Hordern Pavilion
14 February 2015	Brisbane	Australia	Brisbane Convention & Exhibition Centre
20 February 2015^{[A]}	Perth	Australia	Western Australian Museum
21 February 2015^{[A]}	Perth	Australia	Western Australian Museum
22 February 2015	Fremantle	Australia	Fremantle Arts Centre
25 February 2015	Melbourne	Australia	Palais Theatre
26 February 2015	Melbourne	Australia	Palais Theatre
27 February 2015	Melbourne	Australia	Palais Theatre
28 February 2015	Adelaide	Australia	Thebarton Theatre
3 March 2015	Sydney	Australia	Hordern Pavilion
5 March 2015	Melbourne	Australia	Palais Theatre
7 March 2015	Melbourne	Australia	Palais Theatre

Festivals and other miscellaneous performances

^{A} These concerts were a part of the "Perth International Arts Festival"

Cancellations and rescheduled shows

Date	City, (State or Country)	Venue	Reason/Additional info
11 February 2015	Canberra, Australia	ANU Bar	Moved to Royal Theatre

=== Built on Live tour ===
Date	City	Country	Venue
Australia
30 October 2015	Melbourne	Australia	Sidney Myer Music Bowl
31 October 2015	Brisbane	Australia	Riverstage
6 November 2015	Sydney	Australia	Sydney Opera House
7 November 2015	Sydney	Australia	Sydney Opera House

== Charts and certifications ==
=== Weekly charts ===
Chart (2014)	Peak position
Australian Albums (ARIA)	1
Australian Dance Albums (ARIA)	1
Australian Independent Albums (AIR)	1
Belgian Albums (Ultratop Flanders)	31
Belgian Albums (Ultratop Wallonia)	38
French Albums (SNEP)	76
Dutch Albums (Album Top 100)	51
New Zealand Albums (RMNZ)	6
Swiss Albums (Schweizer Hitparade)	49
UK Albums (OCC)	87
UK Independent Albums (OCC)	18
US Billboard 200	158
US Top Dance Albums (Billboard)	6
US Independent Albums (Billboard)	29
US Heatseekers Albums (Billboard)	2

=== Year-end charts ===
Chart (2014)	Position
Australian Albums (ARIA)	12
Chart (2015)	Position
Australian Albums (ARIA)	34

=== Certifications ===
Region	Certification	Certified units/sales
Australia (ARIA)	Platinum	70,000^{^}
^{^} Shipments figures based on certification alone.

== Release history ==
Region	Date	Format(s)	Label	Catalog	Ref.
Australia	11 April 2014	CD; 2×LP; digital download	Future Classic; Opulent	FCL107; FCL107; —	
United Kingdom	14 April 2014	CD; 2×LP; digital download	Future Classic	FCL107CD; FCL107; —	
United States	15 April 2014	CD; 2×LP; digital download	Downtown	DWT70381; DWT70382; —	
Japan	30 April 2014	CD; digital download	Future Classic; Hostess	HSE-30334; —	
