= This Thing of Ours (album) =

Studio album by Rainy Milo
- Released: 3 March 2014
- Recorded: 2013
- Genre: Soul, R&B, hip hop
- Label: Limey/Virgin EMI (UK) / Limey/Big Picnic (US)
- Producer: Daje; Caswell; Chet Faker; Cole M. Greif-Neill; BLCK-RSSN; Flowzart

Rainy Milo chronology
Black and Blonde (2013)	This Thing of Ours (2014)

This Thing of Ours is the debut album from British recording artist Rainy Milo. The album was recorded in the San Francisco Bay area in 2013 with the help of producer, mixer, engineer, and songwriter Daje. The album comes in both standard and deluxe formats, and features Milo's singles "'Deal Me Briefly", "Rats" and "'Bout You".

Producers for the album include Daje, Caswell, Chet Faker, Cole M. Greif-Neill, BLCK-RSSN and Flowzart. The record was originally released in the UK by Milo's label Limey/ Virgin EMI on 3 March 2014. The record was later released in the US and worldwide by Limey/Big Picnic on 21 April 2015. In addition to the new album art, the Clash cover track, "Bankrobber", features Kossisko on the 2015 release.

== Background ==
"There was so little of that where I lived; an area which gave little hope to anyone, it's almost like they were told that they had a crappy fate and were willing to just go along with it."

— Milo, speaking on surrounding herself with inspiring people.

Milo started singing with local musicians and art collectives when she was fourteen. During Milo's childhood she tried to surround herself with inspiring people. Milo began surfing the internet for jazz-inspired hip-hop beats she could sing over, whilst surfing the internet she came across a bead by producer BLCK RSSN. Milo recorded over the beat and the track became her debut recording entitled "'Bout You", the song caught the attention of Gilles Peterson for his Brownswood Bubblers compilation series. Milo received various offers from record labels but turned them down as she felt it was too early. Milo began working on first mixtape entitled Limey, produced by Cole MGN. Milo released her mixtape in October 2012 which gained large amounts of acclaim from critics who called the mixtape a "perfect soundtrack" and praising its "chilly atmospherics and lyrics." Critics also praised Milo's vocals noting them as "startling" and "smoking". In March 2013 a signed recording contract with Mercury and Universal and began working on her debut EP.

== Critical reception ==
Upon release the album received universal acclaim from music critics, Robert Copsey of Digital Spy praised Milo's "effortless blend of R&B, jazz, hip-hop and pop", continuing to note comparisons between her work and the work of Amy Winehouse, Neneh Cherry and Corinne Bailey Rae.

== Track listing ==
No.	Title	Writer(s)	Producer(s)	Length
1.	"Are You Sure"	Rainy Milo, S. Ahrendt, D. Steele	Caswell	3:15
2.	"'Bout You"	Rainy Milo, G. Washington Jr.	BLCK-RSSN	3:13
3.	"This Thing of Ours"	Rainy Milo, Cole M. Greif-Neill	Cole M.G.N.	3:34
4.	"Rats"	Rainy Milo, S. Ahrendt, D. Steele, Don Bryant	Caswell	4:33
5.	"Miss You"	Rainy Milo, S. Ahrendt, D. Steele	Caswell	3:43
6.	"Treasure Girl"	Rainy Milo, Daje	Daje	4:01
7.	"In This Place"	Rainy Milo, S. Ahrendt, D. Steele	Caswell	3:32
8.	"Deal Me Briefly"	Rainy Milo, Chet Faker	Chet Faker, Daje (additional production)	4:56
9.	"Wimbledon"	Rainy Milo, S. Ahrendt, D. Steele	Caswell	2:53
10.	"So Uneasy"	Rainy Milo, S. Ahrendt, D. Steele, Daje, Robert Maxwell (songwriter)	Caswell, Daje	3:42

== Bonus tracks ==
No.	Title	Writer(s)	Producer(s)	Length
1.	"Bankrobber" (feat. Kossisko on 2015 release only)	Michael George Campbell, Michael Geoffrey Jones, John Mellor	Daje	3:01
2.	"Below My Reach"	Rainy Milo, S. Ahrendt, D. Steele	Caswell	4:35

== Credits ==
- Vocals recorded by Flowzart on "'Bout You"
- Mastered by Pete Lyman at Infrasonic Sound in Los Angeles
- Additional Engineering and Programming by Jeff Matej
- Percussion by James Henry on "Bankrobber"
- Male Vocals by Khi Graham on "Rats" and "Below My Reach"
