= Maybe (Carmada song) =

Single by Carmada

from the album Realise
- Released: 11 October 2014
- Length: 4:18
- Label: AudioPaxx
- Songwriter(s): Yahtzel (Max Armata); Drew Carmody; Tanner Petulla

Carmada singles chronology
"Maybe" (2014)	"Realise" (2014)

Music video
- "Realise" on YouTube

"Maybe" is a song recorded by Australian group Carmada and released in October 2014 as the group's debut and lead single from their debut extedend play Realise (2014). Remixes were released in April 2015. The song was certified gold in Australia in 2015.

== Video ==
The video was released on 28 October 2014. It was filmed along Venice Beach in Los Angeles and shows a young woman on a bike messing everybody's things up.

== Track listings ==
Original
No.	Title	Length
1.	"Maybe"	4:18

Remixes
No.	Title	Length
1.	"Maybe" (Dr Fresch remix)	5:31
2.	"Maybe" (TrollPhace & Ju Ju remix)	5:15
3.	"Maybe" (Elk Road and Slumberjack remix)	3:46
4.	"Maybe" (Jesse Slayter remix)	6:10
5.	"Maybe" (Fred V & Grafix remix)	4:13
6.	"Maybe" (Getter remix)	5:40
7.	"Maybe" (Pegboard Nerds remix)	3:51

== Certification ==
Region	Certification	Certified units/sales
Australia (ARIA)	Gold	35,000^{^}
^{^} Shipments figures based on certification alone.
