= Thom Crawford =

Australian singer-songwriter

- Born: Thomas Crawford
- Origin: The Blue Mountains, New South Wales, Australia
- Genre: Alternative
- Occupation: Singer-songwriter
- Instrument: Vocals
- Years active: 2010–present
- Label: Independent
- Website: twitter.com/thomcrawford

Thom Crawford is an Australian alternative music singer and songwriter. He has worked and collaborated with acts both at home and abroad. He has toured in support of Matt Corby, Icehouse, Lanie Lane, Thundamentals, Hilltop Hoods and Ian Moss. He has written with fellow songwriters: Alex Hope, Sarah Aarons, Sacha Skarbek, Joanne Perica, David Ryan Harris, Jon Hume and Paul Herman.

Crawford received a long-list nomination, for Best Original Song Oscar for his track, "Bones", which was used in the documentary film starring Johnny Depp, For No Good Reason (2012). "Bones" is co-written with American songwriter, Perica. He is the featured singer on Australian hip-hop artists, Thundamentals' single, "Something I Said" (February 2014), which peaked in the ARIA Singles Chart top 100. Benson, an Australian house musician, issued a single, "Hollow" featuring Crawford, in September 2015, which reached No. 6 on the ARIA Club Tracks chart.

== Discography ==
=== Singles ===
| Title | Year | Peak chart positions | Album |
| Title | Year | AUS | Album |
|---|---|---|---|
| "Bones" | 2010 | — | Non-album single |
| "Solid Ground" | 2010 | — | Non-album single |
"—" denotes releases that did not chart or were not released.

=== Featured singles ===
| Year | Title | Peak chart positions | Album |
| Year | Title | AUS | Album |
|---|---|---|---|
| 2014 | "Something I Said" (Thundamentals featuring Thom Crawford) | 66 | So We Can Remember |
| 2015 | "Hollow" (Benson featuring Thom Crawford) | — | Non-album single |
| 2017 | "Ring A Bell" (David Dallas featuring Thom Crawford) | — | "Hood Country Club" |
| 2019 | "Nowa Nowa" (Nooky featuring Thom Crawford) | — | "Junction Court" |
| 2021 | "They Don't Know" (Birdz featuring Thom Crawford) | — | "Legacy" |
