= Tuka (rapper) =

Australian rapper

- Born: Brendan Tuckerman; 20 March 1985 (age 41); Medlow Bath
- Origin: Blue Mountains, New South Wales, Australia
- Genre: Australian hip hop
- Occupations: Rapper, record producer
- Instrument: Vocals
- Years active: 2009–present
- Labels: EMI; Big Village; Obese
- Member of: Thundamentals
- Website: tuka.net.au

Brendan Tuckerman (born 20 March 1985), who performs as Tuka, is an Australian hip hop artist from the Blue Mountains, New South Wales. He is a member of Thundamentals and a previous member of Rumpunch and Connect 4. He is also a solo artist, having released three studio albums, and he co-produces his original music. He supported Horrorshow on their "Listen Close" tour and in late 2015 toured Australia and the US on his first headline tour to support his third album Life Death Time Eternal (10 July 2015). He felt this album was less introspective. It peaked at number 6 on the ARIA Albums Chart.

== Influences ==
Tuckerman cites Wu-Tang Clan and "people like Mos Def" as role models when younger (though if it were now, it would be Kendrick Lamar). Additionally, Tuckerman has described acts such as Urthboy and Ozi Batla of The Herd as musically "super inspiring".

== Discography ==
=== Studio albums ===
List of studio albums, with selected chart positions shown
Title	Album details	Peak chart positions
Title	Album details	AUS
Will Rap for Tuka	Released: 5 November 2010; Label: Big Village; Formats: CD, digital download	—
Feedback Loop	Released: 26 October 2012; Label: Big Village; Formats: CD, digital download	92
Life Death Time Eternal	Released: 10 July 2015; Label: EMI; Formats: CD, LP, digital download, streaming	6
Nothing in Common But Us	Released: 31 July 2020; Label: EMI Australia, Universal Music Australia; Formats: CD, digital download, streaming	45

=== Extended plays ===
List of EPs, with release date and label shown
Title	Details	Peak chart positions
Title	Details	AUS
Alive Death Time Eternal Sessions (Live)	Released: 18 March 2016; Label: EMI; Formats: Digital download	80

=== Singles ===
==== As lead artist ====
List of singles as lead artist, with year released and album shown
Title	Year	Album
"Just to Feel Wanted"	2012	Feedback Loop
"Die a Happy Man" (featuring Jane Tyrell)	2012	Feedback Loop
"Too Soon"	2013	Feedback Loop
"Nirvana"	2015	Life Death Time Eternal
"Tattoo"	2015	Life Death Time Eternal
"My Star"	2015	Life Death Time Eternal
"Naked Heart"	2018	Non-album single
"F*ck You Pay Me"	2019	Nothing in Common But Us
"Selling Me Out"	2019	Nothing in Common But Us
"Trailer Trash"	2019	Nothing in Common But Us
"Dickheads" (featuring Alex the Astronaut)	2020	Non-album single
"January 1st"	2020	Nothing in Common But Us
"Wish I Knew"	2020	Nothing in Common But Us
"—" denotes releases that did not chart or were not released.

==== As featured artist ====
List of singles as featured artist, with year released and album shown
Title	Year	Album
"Christmas Number 1" ("Triple J and Friends")	2013	Non-album single
"—" denotes releases that did not chart or were not released.

=== Music videos ===
List of music videos, with year released and director shown
Title	Year	Director(s)
"Time & Space"	2012	Dean Wells
"Die a Happy Man" (featuring Jane Tyrell)	2012	Primo Creative
"Christmas Number 1" (Triple J & Friends)	2013	None
"Nirvana"	2015	Oh Yeah Wow
"Yeah Right"	2015	Tuka & Sean McDermott
"Tattoo"	2015	Adam Callen
"My Star"	2015	Harry Hunter & Mike Williamson

=== Guest appearances ===
List of non-single featured appearances, with year released and album shown
Title	Year	Album
"We've Arrived" (Chasm featuring Jeswon, Tuka, Skryptcha, Scott Burns, Rinse & Dialectrix)	2012	This Is How We Never Die
"Tipping Point" (Surburban Dark featuring Tuka & Elemont)	2013	Second Front
"Waste Your Time" (Remix) (Horrorshow featuring Tuka)	2014	Nice Guys Finish Last (B-side)
"House of the Rising Sun" (alt-J featuring Tuka)	2018	Reduxer
