= Australian Independent Record Labels Association =

Australian music trade association

- Abbreviation: AIR
- Formation: 1996
- Founders: Ed Jonker, Michael McMichael, Sebastian Chase, Graeme Reagan
- Founded at: Sydney, Australia
- Type: Trade association
- Legal status: Australian public company
- Location: Melbourne
- Website: www.air.org.au

The Australian Independent Record Labels Association (commonly known as AIR), formerly Association of Independent Record Labels, is a non-profit trade association which supports the growth and development of Australia's independent recording industry. It represents Australian-owned record labels and independent artists based in Australia who function without the backing of major record labels.

AIR was founded in 1996 in Sydney and is now located in Melbourne. In 2000, it founded the Independent Music Charts, also known as AIR Charts, which track the sales of Australia's highest-selling independent artists on a weekly and monthly basis, and since 2006 the annual Independent Music Awards, or AIR Awards, have been run to celebrate the year's highest-charting independently released Australian singles and albums.

== History ==
AIR was started by a group of Sydney and Melbourne music industry professionals and labels, who began meeting regularly to formulate ideas on how to start an industry association that would assist the ongoing development of Australia's independent record industry. The association was incorporated in 1996 thanks to a small donation from Phantom Records, and received its first operation funding grant from the Australia Council for the Arts in 1998.

Additional Australia Council funding was received in 2000, and in this same year, members also voted to change AIR's legal status from Incorporated Association to Company Limited by Guarantee.

AIR moved its base from Sydney, New South Wales, to Brisbane, Queensland, in 2004 when Stuart Watters (formerly of Q Music, Queensland's state music council) took over as its chief executive officer. In 2007 AIR moved its operations from Brisbane to Melbourne, Victoria, where it is now based in the Rubber Records and Media Arts Lawyers building in North Melbourne.

In 2009 it registered a collective bargaining notification to bargain on behalf of 63 participating members, with each of Telstra, Optus, Foxtel, Austar, MTV, XYZnetworks, Fuel TV (Australia) and Bigpond, regarding the licensing of sound recording rights in respect of public performance and transmission of music videos. The application, which would last for three years, was approved. The collective bargaining power brought a number of benefits to members.

== Members ==
AIR began as a small association with 25 members to a company with over 200 financial members across all sectors of the Australian music industry. AIR's membership of significant Australian Independent Record Labels includes but is not limited to Head Records, Shock Records, Elefant Traks, Obese Records, Dew Process, Liberation Music, Plus One Records, Remote Control Records, MGM Distribution, UNFD – We Are Unified, Ivy League Records, Vitamin Records, Eleven: A Music Company, Red Cat Records, Illusive Sounds, Future Classic, Casadeldisco Records and Jarrah Records.

As of 2019 it has about 350 members.

== Purpose and function ==
AIR is the national industry association representing "indie labels" in Australia, which aims to represent their members' interests both in Australia and elsewhere. With this sector of the recording industry representing about 85% of all Australian recorded music, AIR's primary role is growing the marketplace for this music. Representing their members individually and collectively is done through advocacy, negotiations, and helping with access to new markets internationally. It services businesses of all shapes and sizes, battles copyright violations and helps to develop artists' careers. AIR represents the Australian industry internationally as a member of Worldwide Independent Network (WIN), a coalition of independent music bodies from countries throughout the world.

On 4 July 2008 AIR took part in WIN's Independents Day initiative, the first annual coordinated celebration of independent music across the world. As a major part of these celebrations AIR conducted an online poll for Australia's greatest independent records of all time.

== 2017 market analysis ==
In 2017, AIR commissioned Deloitte Access Economics to produce AIR Share: Australian Independent Music Market Report, the first market analysis of the industry, which showed that indie labels represented 30% of revenue generated by the Australian recorded music market. It also showed that 57% of independent sector revenue is from Australian artists, which put the Australian sector in the Top 10 global list of mainly English-speaking indie music markets.

The report valued the Australian recording industry as worth A$399.4 million, sixth largest music market in the world in terms of revenue and ahead of countries with higher populations such as Canada and South Korea. Digital revenue, at 44%, had overtaken that coming from physical sales, at 33%. A spokesperson from the company Unified Music Group said that governments were beginning to recognise the financial and cultural worth of a thriving music industry, but there was still a big challenge for the independents to compete with well-funded tech companies that have an anti-copyright agenda.

== Independent Music Charts ==
In 2000, AIR inaugurated the Independent Music Charts, which track the sales of Australia's highest selling independent artists. The top 20 independent singles and albums were published on a weekly basis, but genre charts for jazz, hip hop, blues and roots, hard rock/punk and country music were published once a month.

When Jägermeister took over as major sponsor of the AIR Awards in 2008, they announced that AIR Charts would undergo some changes, including a new website, aimed at developing new audiences for Australian music, both in Australia and worldwide. In 2010 a further three-year deal for sponsorship by Jägermeister was announced, with the awards renamed the Jägermeister Independent Music Awards and the charts Jägermeister Independent Music Charts. When Carlton Dry took over the sponsorship in 2013, the charts were renamed the Carlton Dry Independent Music Charts.

As of 2019, the AIR Charts include four categories and include the top 20 in each: 100% independent singles; 100% independent albums; independent label singles; and independent label albums. The lists are created by AIR from data supplied by the Australian Recording Industry Association (ARIA).

The AIR Charts differ from the ARIA Charts in that they focus on Australian artists represented only by Australian independent labels. As of 2019 the monthly genre categories are no longer published The weekly charts, published on each Monday, feature the top 20 in each of the following categories: 100% Independent Singles; 100% Independent Albums; Independent Label Singles; and Independent Label Albums. The distinction between the "100%" and "Label" categories were described in 2009 as follows:

- 100% Indie: Independent releases distributed through an independent distributor
- Indie Label: Independent releases distributed through any distributor, including a major distributor.

The top 50 of the AIR singles charts are also published by online industry magazine The Music Network, along with various other charts.

== Australian Independent Record (AIR) Awards ==
Beginning in 2006, the AIR commenced the annual AIR Awards, celebrating the success of Australian independent music.

== Indie-Con Australia ==
The inaugural "Indie-Con Australia" music industry conference took place in July 2017 in Adelaide, to coincide with the 11th AIR Awards. The conference has continued until 2019, with the support from the South Australian government. (One article describes it as an "offshoot" of the Indie-Con UK conference, which is organised by Association of Independent Music AIM, but it appears to be independently run in Australia.)

The conference was held at Tandanya National Aboriginal Cultural Institute in 2017, at The Hindley (then part of the HQ complex in Hindley Street) in 2018 and at Lot Fourteen in 2019.

== Sponsors ==
As of 2019, the City of Adelaide, the South Australian Tourism Commission and the South Australian Government through the Department of the Premier and Cabinet and the Music Development Office (MDO, in the Department of Innovation & Skills) are major sponsors of the Awards and Indie-Con. Supporting partners include the Australia Council, Moshtix, APRA/AMCOS, radio stations Fresh 92.7 and Radio Adelaide and others.

== See also ==
- Free music
- Independent record labels
- Music industry
- Music recording sales certification
- List of links at Indie (disambiguation)#Music
- Lists of record labels
- List of largest music deals
