= Monteith POW camp =

WW2 POW camp in Ontario, Canada

Coordinates: 48.64°N 80.68°W

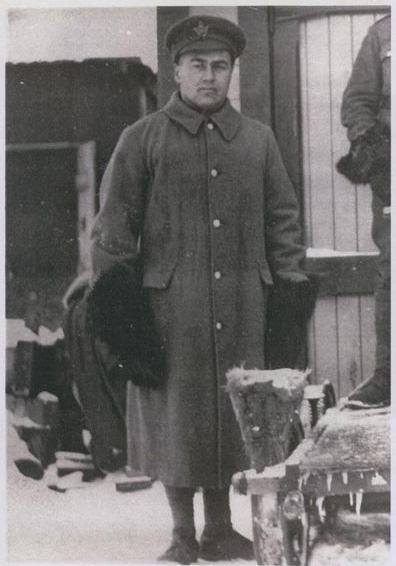
Guard Peter Pappin, Camp 23, Monteith Ontario.

The POW Camp 23, Monteith was a Canadian-run POW camp during World War II, located in Monteith, Iroquois Falls, Ontario.

== History ==
Before World War II, the camp was a lumber camp employing about forty men. Board lumber was cut on site and shipped about 8 km to the rail line.

In July 1940, the camp was converted into POW Camp Q, later called Camp 23, by the Canadian government. The camp had a maximum capacity of 4000. The prisoners included interned German nationals in addition to captured German soldiers. The German national internees, as distinct from prisoners of war, had largely been classified as "enemy aliens", many shipped from Britain after the fall of France in 1940 under Churchill's "collar the lot" edict. As most of these were in fact Jewish or political refugees from the Nazi regime (and so would have formally had their German citizenship withdrawn by the authorities there, thus being effectively stateless, even if this factor was not realised or recognised in the UK), after vetting many were allowed to return to Britain to join the armed forces.

One such interned German national was Wulff Scherchen, the 20-year old son of the German conductor Hermann Scherchen, who was living in Cambridge when he was arrested in 1940 and shipped to Canada. Wulff Scherchen was the romantic interest of Benjamin Britten, himself only 26 at the time. Many of his letters to Britten from Camp Q (POW Camp 23) survive. Over 80 years later, with his consent, these heartfelt letters were made into an orchestral song cycle called Serenade for Tenor, Saxophone and Orchestra by composer Lyle Chan.

The camp ceased operating as a military POW camp in 1946 and became a provincial reformatory known today as the Monteith Correctional Complex.
