= Serenade for Tenor, Saxophone and Orchestra ("My Dear Benjamin") =

2016 musical composition by Lyle Chan

Serenade for Tenor, Saxophone and Orchestra ("My Dear Benjamin") is a musical composition by Lyle Chan. Its text is drawn from letters between the English composer Benjamin Britten and his first romantic interest, Wulff Scherchen. This orchestral song cycle forms a section within Chan's larger work Voices and Instruments. A complete performance lasts approximately 40 minutes.

The work was commissioned by the Queensland Symphony Orchestra and premiered at the 2016 Brisbane Festival, on 22 September. The world premiere was performed by tenor Andrew Goodwin, saxophonist Michael Duke, and the Queensland Symphony Orchestra under conductor Paul Kildea, the Britten biographer.

Scherchen died six weeks before the concert, at the age of 96, and the concert was dedicated to his memory. Both ArtsHub and The AU Review included the song cycle in their top ten shows at the 2016 Brisbane Festival. It is one of four works shortlisted for Orchestral Work of the Year in the 2017 Art Music Awards.

The work has been broadcast in its entirety twice by ABC Classic FM, in November 2016 and January 2017.

Serenade is the subject of the final chapter of Tony Scotland's biography of Wulff Scherchen.

== Historical background ==
Wulff Scherchen was a young German man, the son of conductor Hermann Scherchen. Though they first met in Siena, Italy when Britten was 20 and Scherchen nearly 14, the romantic friendship did not begin until four years later, when Scherchen had started living in Cambridge.

This relationship hit a crisis when World War II broke out and Scherchen was incarcerated as an enemy alien. He was deported to a prisoner of war camp in Canada (Camp 23).

Throughout the relationship, Britten and Scherchen corresponded. "The one person constantly in my thoughts and on my mind without fail was you. No one else occupied my heart, my mind or my body", wrote Scherchen to Britten in 1941.

Lyle Chan discovered this story via the book and film Britten's Children by John Bridcut. Chan met Scherchen after learning that he was alive at the age of 95 and living in northern New South Wales with his wife of over seventy years, under the name John Woolford, which he had assumed after his release from internment in 1941.

In 2015, Scherchen consented to have these letters turned into a song cycle. Chan theorized that Britten's own works contain a coded symbol of Scherchen, the saxophone, and so this instrument was given a solo role.

== Structure ==
The song cycle is four sections containing thirteen numbers.

Epilogue and Part 1

"Epilogue", 1941

I. The Past Is Still Terrifyingly Alive (letter by Scherchen)

England, 1938

II. "I Live in a Wind Mill" (letters by Britten and Scherchen)

III. "Well, Old thing (Buy Yourself a Typewriter)" (letters by Britten and Scherchen)

IV. "No Presents" (letter by Scherchen)

V. "Go Boil Yourself" (letter by Scherchen)

Part 2

America, 1939

VI. "Wulffsick" (letter by Britten)

VIIa. "War Has Broken Out" (letter by Scherchen)

VIIb. "I Was Interned on Whit Sunday" (letter by Scherchen)

Part 3

Canada, 1940

VIIc. "Not a Love Letter" (letter by Scherchen)

VIIIa. "One Doesn't Get Answers" (letter by Britten)

VIIIb. Double Double Bass (for double bass four-hands)

IX. "You Must Forgive Me" (letter by Scherchen)

Part 4

England, 1941

X. "I Have Returned to England" (letter by Scherchen)

XI. "It Seems Too Good to Be True" (Ben's Farewell) (letter by Britten)

XII. "My Thoughts Are Put at Rest" (Wulff's Farewell) (letter by Scherchen)

XIII. Postlude
