= John Woolford (muse) =

Muse and romantic interest of Benjamin Britten (1920–2016)

John Woolford (30 May 1920 – 9 August 2016) was the muse, confidant, and the first romantic interest of the composer Benjamin Britten.

He was born Karl Hermann Scherchen, nicknamed "Wulff", in Berlin, the son of the German conductor Hermann Scherchen.

Britten and Scherchen first met at the International Society for Contemporary Music Festival in Florence in March 1934, when Scherchen was 13 and there only because of his father's professional commitments. The 20-year-old Britten was there to attend performances of his own music. They became friends, even sharing one raincoat between the two of them in the Siena rain, but did not stay in contact after the festival.

Following her divorce and to escape the rise of Nazism in Germany, Wulff Scherchen's mother Gustel brought him in 1934 to England, where they settled in Cambridge. She became a secretary to Edward Dent, Professor of Music at University of Cambridge, and he attended The Perse School. On discovering Scherchen was in England, Britten invited him to visit his home, an old windmill in Suffolk. A romantic friendship developed, as attested to by the large quantity of extant but unpublished correspondence.

In 1939 Britten went to the US with Peter Pears, ostensibly for work but also to escape the entry of Great Britain into World War II. While Britten was away, Scherchen was offered a place to study engineering at Queen Mary College, London, (which had been evacuated to Cambridge), but in May 1940 he was arrested, interned as an enemy alien and shipped to Monteith POW Camp in Canada.

Their correspondence continued, though hampered by the war's censors and unreliable delivery. His frustration at being interned is clear, and he is embarrassed to ask Britten to send him clothing, books, and money for toothpaste.

To obtain his release, Scherchen voluntarily enlisted with the Auxiliary Military Pioneer Corps in 1942, which required him to change his name. He returned to England and trained with the Royal Engineers as a bomb disposal expert. Britten and Scherchen met only once more, in 1942, but the relationship had not survived the long separation.

Scherchen took the last name of a woman from the air force he had met, Pauline Woolford, and became known as John Woolford. They married in 1943. In the 1980s the couple emigrated to Australia where two of their four children had already been living. They were inseparable until Pauline Woolford's death in January 2016.

Scherchen was the dedicatee of the song "Antique" in Britten's song cycle Les Illuminations (1939–40). Britten handed him a gift of a signed copy of the published score at their last meeting in London in 1942. Scherchen was also the inspiration behind Young Apollo, a work for piano and strings which Britten withdrew without explanation after only two performances in 1939.

In 2015 the Australian composer Lyle Chan discovered that Wulff Scherchen was still alive and living in Australia. Chan met Scherchen, then aged 95, and obtained his consent to make a song cycle out of the letters between him and Britten, which chart their entire romantic friendship from their first meeting to the break-up of their relationship under the strain of Scherchen's wartime incarceration as an enemy alien. The Brisbane Festival presented the world premiere of the work, Serenade for Tenor, Saxophone and Orchestra ("My Dear Benjamin") in September 2016, performed by the Queensland Symphony Orchestra.

Scherchen was a central interview subject in John Bridcut's film Britten's Children and the subject of a book-length biography Wulff: Britten's Young Apollo by Tony Scotland.
