= Britten's Children =

Non-fiction book by John Bridcut on Benjamin Britten

- Author: John Bridcut
- Subject: Benjamin Britten
- Publication date: 2006

Britten's Children is a scholarly 2006 book by John Bridcut that describes the English composer Benjamin Britten's relationship with several adolescent boys. Bridcut has been praised for treating such a sensitive subject in "an impeccably unsensational tone". The Britten-Pears Foundation described the book as having been "enthusiastically received as shedding new light on one of the most interesting aspects of Britten's life and career, in a study that is thoroughly researched, wonderfully readable and thought-provoking". Bridcut's book followed his television documentary Britten's Children shown on BBC2 in June 2004.

== Synopsis ==
Bridcut writes that 13-year-old boys were Britten's ideal. He liked to imagine himself as still thirteen years old and once explained his ability to write so well for children, "It's because I'm still thirteen". Bridcut provides ample evidence that Britten was sexually attracted to young boys, but similarly shows that it is unlikely that Britten ever stepped over the line of propriety.

Britten lived with his long-time partner Peter Pears. Nevertheless, as Bridcut notes, there was frequent and continuing gossip in society about Britten's infatuation with boys. Britten would provide each new favourite with gifts and treats, and was a prolific letter-writer. The thousands of surviving letters are the source for many of Bridcut's observations.

Britten had a close friendship with Wulff Scherchen (son of the conductor Hermann Scherchen, and later known as John Woolford) whom he met when Wulff was 14 and Britten 21. Five years later in 1939, Britten dedicated the song "Antique" from his song cycle Les Illuminations to Wulff. As a German national, Scherchen was interned during World War II, following which he served in the British army. He and Britten continued to correspond, but when they met again in 1942 Britten found the 22-year-old "rather altered, I am afraid ... rather vindictive, and hard." The friendship faded, and Wulff eventually married.

The relationship with Wulff overlapped Britten's meeting with Peter Pears – Pears is also the dedicatee of a song in the Rimbaud cycle. In 1989 Wulff recalled, "I adored Peter. He was a wonderful father figure ... and I thought in a sense that he was the father to Benjamin at the same time ... He would restrain Benjamin when Ben was going off the rails ... He had this air of stability that Ben didn't have."

Thirteen-year-old Piers Dunkerley, whom Britten met aged 20 and described by Bridcut as "emphatically good-looking", was another early favourite. The composer's website reports that Dunkerley, one of Britten's closest friends, took part in the 1944 Normandy landings. Unlike the other three dedicatees of Britten's War Requiem, Dunkerley "survived the war but committed suicide in June 1959, two months before his wedding" and three years before the premiere of the requiem at Coventry Cathedral's reconsecration.

Thirteen-year-old Harry Morris, whom Britten met in 1936, was from a troubled home, and Harry was the only boy ever to accuse Britten of sexual abuse. They were on holiday in Cornwall together and Bridcut recounts that Harry claimed that Britten made "what he understood as a sexual approach from Britten in his bedroom". Harry said he screamed and hit Britten with a chair and then Britten's sister Beth rushed into the room. Harry left the next morning and told his mother what had happened, but she did not believe him. John Bridcut was interviewed by Andrew Marr on BBC Radio 4's Start the Week in June 2006. Britten's sexual attraction for 13/14-year-old boys was the subject of the interview and the incident with Harry Morris, when Britten "may have crossed the line", was described in detail.

Bridcut writes about Britten's friendship with Humphrey Maud which started when the boy was nine. They became close friends a few years later when Humphrey was at Eton. Humphrey's father Sir John Maud, who was then Permanent Secretary at the Ministry of Education and would therefore have been wary of any potential scandal, eventually intervened to ask Britten to stop inviting Humphrey to spend school holidays with him at Aldeburgh. Humphrey himself told Bridcut: "I certainly don't think that he [Sir John Maud] was ever afraid that I might be the victim of my friendship with Britten. I think it was a precautionary measure; just in case others might think ill of it, it would be as well that it should be seen to stop." Britten dedicated The Young Person's Guide to the Orchestra to Humphrey and the other Maud children.

Jonathan Gathorne-Hardy was another friend of Britten. Fourteen-year-old Jonny "could not help flirting slightly" and was "at once aware I attracted him". Jonny and his siblings and cousins provided the children's names for Britten's opera The Little Sweep. David Spenser was thirteen years old when he had the role of Harry in Britten's opera Albert Herring. When he first went to stay with Britten at Crag House, they shared a double bed, Britten explaining that with the recent move from the Old Mill at Snape it was the only bed in the house. Not all Britten's young boys were musicians. He was very fond of a local boy Robin Long, known as "Nipper", and he used to take the boy sailing.

Bridcut interviewed a number of Britten's children including the actor David Hemmings. Hemmings was twelve when he came into Britten's life as the creator of the role of Miles in Britten's The Turn of the Screw. The conductor Charles Mackerras observed, "David Hemmings was an extremely good looking young chap and he also very much played up to Ben's obvious adoration of him, and drank it in," and adds, "Obviously it was a sexual attraction but I'm sure that it was never actually fulfilled." Hemmings told Bridcut: "He was not only a father to me, but a friend – and you couldn't have had a better father or a better friend. [...] Everybody asks me whether or not he gave me one, whether or not it was a sexual relationship. The answer to that question, as I have often said, is: no, he did not. I have slept in his bed, yes, only because I was scared at night...and I have never ever, ever felt threatened by Ben at all because I was more heterosexual than Genghis Khan!"

Bridcut also writes at length about Roger Duncan. Duncan was aged eleven when he first met Britten. Their relationship was unusual in that Britten persuaded Roger's father to share him and Roger spent many weeks staying with Britten. Roger's father was the writer Ronald Duncan, the librettist of The Rape of Lucretia. Both Roger and Humphrey Stone, another young friend, recall enjoying regular naked midnight swims with Britten.

Bridcut makes it clear that Britten was inspired by his love of young boys to write extensively for children, and particularly for boy trebles. Among his finest works are The Turn of the Screw, with the dark relationship between Quint and Miles, and Death in Venice, based on Thomas Mann's novella about the tragic love of a novelist for the beautiful boy Tadzio.

Jonathan Keates' review in The Daily Telegraph sums up the dilemma of writing about Britten's children: "Nowadays a known homosexual who sought out the company and affection of small boys would probably end up on a police register or behind bars. In treating Britten's fondness for the young of his own sex as something more than lipsmacking paedophilia, this book does him a service both as a man and an artist." In a similar vein, in a review in The Times, David Matthews wrote "Many paedophiles were abused as children, and their dangerous desires are motivated by hatred. Britten's were motivated by love, which may have been to a large extent narcissistic and, as John Bridcut's book reveals, often ended with an abrupt withdrawal of attention when the boy grew up, but which was fundamentally benign."

== Influence ==
Australian composer Lyle Chan discovered the relationship between Britten and Wulff Scherchen on reading Britten's Children in 2015. He sought out Scherchen, then a 95-year-old man living in Australia, and obtained his consent to create a song cycle out of the story of the relationship. The Serenade for Tenor, Saxophone and Orchestra ("My Dear Benjamin") was commissioned by the Queensland Symphony Orchestra and premiered at the 2016 Brisbane Festival.

== See also ==
- Michael Crawford—former child actor and singer who acknowledged Britten's support in his early career.
