= XX International AIDS Conference, 2014 =

The XX International AIDS Conference was held in Melbourne, Australia from 20 to 25 July 2014 at the Melbourne Convention and Exhibition Centre. It was organized by the International AIDS Society. Over 14,000 scientists, campaigners and politicians were expected to attend.

== Conference proceedings ==
From July 20 to 25, 2014, Melbourne, Australia hosted the 20th International AIDS Conference. Speakers included Michael Kirby, Richard Branson and Bill Clinton. Clinton's focus was HIV treatment and he called for a greater levels of treatment provision worldwide; in an interview during the conference, Kirby focused on legal issues and their relationship to medication costs and vulnerable groups—Kirby concluded by calling for an international inquiry:

And what is needed, as the Global Commission on HIV and the Law pointed out, is a new inquiry at international level – inaugurated by the secretary-general of the United Nations – to investigate a reconciliation between the right to health and the right of authors to proper protection for their inventions. At the moment, all the eggs are in the basket of the authors, and it's not really a proportionate balance. And that's why the Global Commission suggested that there should be a high level of investigation.

Branson, Global Drug Commissioner at the time of the conference, stressed the importance of decriminalizing illicit injecting drug use to the prevention of HIV and, speaking in global terms, stated that "we're using too much money and far too many precious resources on incarceration". The Open Society Foundation launched the "To Protect and Serve How Police, Sex Workers, and People Who Use Drugs Are Joining Forces to Improve Health and Human Rights" report at the conference.

== Malaysia Airlines Flight 17 ==
The International AIDS Society confirmed that six delegates were killed in the crash of Malaysia Airlines Flight 17 that was shot down over eastern Ukraine on 17 July 2014. The six delegates, including former society president Joep Lange, were acknowledged during the conference at the AIDS 2014 Candlelight Vigil event. News of the crash broke as the Australian Broadcasting Corporation was preparing to air a live performance of the AIDS Memoir Quartet, a memorial work by former ACT UP activist Lyle Chan. Presenter Julian Day and Lyle Chan dedicated the performance to the crash victims and their families.
