= Acacia Quartet =

The Acacia Quartet is a string quartet based in Australia. It was founded in 2010 by violinists Lisa Stewart and Myee Clohessy, violist Stefan Duwe, and cellist Anna Martin-Scrase. Stewart plays A. E Smith violins. With the departure of Clohessy, Doreen Cummings joined the quartet as second violin.

The Acacia Quartet were artists-in-residence at the radio station Fine Music 102.5 from 2014 to 2016. They made their international debut performing the 2-hour long AIDS Memoir Quartet of Lyle Chan in Vancouver, Canada and then travelled to Berlin to perform and record several string quartets by the Nazi-banned late German composer Günter Raphael. Their discography demonstrates their longstanding collaborations with Australian composers Lyle Chan, Elena Kats-Chernin. and Moya Henderson. Jane Sheldon recorded with the quartet.

In 2018 Acacia Quartet collaborated with classical guitarist Matt Withers for his Australian Music Composition Competition, culminating in a tour and CD recording of new Australian music. Imaginations double album was digitally released by ABC Classics and subsequently featured on multiple radio stations around Australia as CD of the Week as well as in Virgin Australia's Inflight Entertainment.

== Awards and nominations ==
=== ARIA Music Awards ===
The ARIA Music Awards are presented annually from 1987 by the Australian Recording Industry Association (ARIA).

Year	Nominee / work	Award	Result	Ref.
2013	North + South • Ten Folk Songs (with Jane Sheldon & Genevieve Lang)	Best Classical Album	Nominated	
2020	Muse (with Alicia Crossley)	Best Classical Album	Nominated	
