= Ivan Romanoff =

Canadian conductor, violinist, arranger and composer

Ivan Romanoff (8 March 1914 – 14 March 1997) was a Canadian conductor, violinist, arranger, and composer. For three decades he led the "Ivan Romanoff Orchestra and Chorus" on a variety of radio and television programs for the Canadian Broadcasting Corporation, on commercial recordings, and in live concerts throughout North America. As a composer he wrote a number of jingles for Canadian television and radio and incidental music for several television movies produced by the CBC. He also composed a number of songs that were written in a variety of national styles.

== Early life and education ==
Born Ivan Pezhuk in Toronto, Romanoff was the son of Ukrainian immigrants. As a child he performed in a mandolin orchestra and was a violin pupil of Alexander Chuhaldin, Chris Dafeff, Broadus Farmer, and Kathleen Parlow at the Toronto Conservatory of Music. He began playing the violin in a number of radio orchestras conducted by Chuhaldin in the early 1930s and was at the same time actively performing in Toronto with Stanley St John's dance band. Soon thereafter he appeared in the Promenade Symphony Concerts and he became active as a violinist with various orchestras at the Canadian Broadcasting Corporation. He was also heard as a soloist on the CBC programs Sixteen Men and a Harp, Gypsy Crossroads, and Russian Ensemble. From 1943 to 1946 he was a conductor, arranger, and performer for the Royal Canadian Navy musical revue Meet the Navy.

After World War II, Romanoff entered the Academy of Performing Arts in Prague where he studied from 1947 to 1949. His teachers there included Milo Dolenzil (composition), Jindřich Feld (violin), and Václav Talich (conducting). At the 1947 Prague Spring Festival he conducted the Czech Philharmonic Orchestra in performances of works by Barbara Pentland, Harry Somers, and John Weinzweig.

== Career ==
In 1949 Romanoff returned to his native country and resumed working for the CBC. In 1950 he led a string ensemble for the CBC Radio program Continental Moods. The following year he worked for a short time as a violist for the Solway String Quartet and served as music director for CBC Radio presentations of Nikolai Rimsky-Korsakov's May Night and C. Hulak-Artemowsky's The Cossack beyond the Danube.

In 1953 the CBC gave Romanoff his own radio show, Songs of My People, which featured the "Ivan Romanoff Orchestra and Chorus". The program was presented weekly through 1963, resulting in Romanoff and his orchestra/chorus were featured on a series of other radio shows: Continental Holiday (1964, 1970–1972), Continental Rhapsody (1965-1970), The Music of Ivan Romanoff (1972-1973), and Music of Our People (1973-1976). Romanoff and his orchestra were also actively performing on CBC Television, beginning with his program Rhapsody (1958-1959) which was the first multilingual folksong-and-dance program nationally broadcast on television in Canada. The group also performed in a number of TV specials during the 1960s. Romanoff continued to lead his orchestra in performances up until his retirement in 1983, touring throughout Canada and the United States and making more than 10 commercial albums, many of them for RCI Records. He died in Toronto in 1997 at the age of 83.

== Discography ==
Ballads of the Cossack, Columbia, 1961

Continental Rhapsody, Capitol / SN-6281, 1968

Ukrainian Rhapsody, Capitol / SN 6299, 1968

Ukrainian Christmas, Capitol / ST-6333, 1969

Romanoff Presents A Continental Affair, Capitol Records, ST-302

Rhapsody with Romanoff, Columbia, FL 245

A Continental Affair

To Life, to Love, to Music!, Boot / BOS 7183, 1977
