= Albert Pratz =

Canadian violinist, conductor, composer and music educator

Albert Pratz (13 May 1914 – 28 March 1995) was a Canadian violinist, conductor, composer, and music educator. He was awarded the Canadian Centennial Medal in 1967. His compositional output was modest and consists of only instrumental works. Some of his compositions, such as Melanie Waltz (1956) and A Tango (1957), were recorded by the CBC Symphony Orchestra; of which he was concertmaster from 1953 to 1961. He worked in the same capacity for the Buffalo Philharmonic Orchestra from 1966 to 1969, and the Toronto Symphony Orchestra from 1970 to 1979. He was also active as a teacher, both privately and at a number of universities, and made recordings as both a violinist and conductor.

== Education and early career ==
Born in Toronto, Pratz studied in his native city with Broadus Farmer and Luigi von Kunits. During the early summer of 1930 he was a pupil of Mischa Mischakoff in the United States. In 1933 he studied with Michel Piastro in the US, and in 1936–1937 he studied under William Primrose in Europe.

Pratz started his career playing in a radio orchestra for the CFRB with conductor Alexander Chuhaldin in 1929. Throughout the 1930s he played in various orchestras including the Canadian Radio Broadcasting Commission and the CBC Radio. From 1933 to 1941 he played in the first violin section of the Toronto Symphony Orchestra. In 1937 he made his solo debut at the Promenade Symphony Concerts performing the Tchaikovsky's Violin Concerto under the baton of Reginald Stewart. He served as the conductor of the CBC's orchestra in Winnipeg from 1940 to 1943.

== Military service and career in New York ==
In 1943 Pratz relocated to New York City to join the United States Army as a private, serving from April 1944 to February 1946. He was stationed at Camp Crowder in Missouri and performed as a member of the Seventh Service Command and the Production Urgency Caravan.

From 1946 to 1953 he was a violinist in the NBC Symphony Orchestra under conductor Arturo Toscanini. During that time he also played for a variety of New York studio and pit orchestras, including being the concertmaster/solo violinist for the original Broadway production of Rodgers and Hammerstein's Oklahoma!. He was also associate conductor for the musical One Touch of Venus.

== Later career in Canada ==
In 1953 Pratz returned to Canada to join the faculty of The Royal Conservatory of Music (RCM) and become the concertmaster of the CBC Symphony Orchestra (CBCSO). He also joined the Festival Trio chamber group in 1953 whose other members included the cellist Isaac Mamott and the pianist Glenn Gould. Although he only performed with the trio for one year, performed in several notable concerts, including at the Stratford Festival.

Pratz taught at the RCM through 1961 where his notable pupils included Imant Raminsh, Bill Richards, Steven Staryk, and David Zafer. He remained in his post at the CBCSO through 1961, notably appearing as a soloist in performances of works by Johannes Brahms (1953), Henri Vieuxtemps (1954), John Weinzweig (premiere, 1955), Tchaikovsky (1956), Giovanni Battista Viotti (1957), Ferruccio Busoni (1958), Philip Bliss (1959), Édouard Lalo (1960), William Walton (1962), and Aram Khachaturian (1964). He also working as an occasional guest conductor for the CBCSO radio broadcasts, including conducting all of their performances on the CBC Radio series Let's Make Music and The Music Box. He later played with the CBC Festival Orchestra in the Canadian premiere of Berio's Concertino 1951 in 1973.

From 1955 to 1960 Pratz served as the concertmaster of the Hart House Orchestra, with which he also was heard frequently as a soloist. He also appeared frequently as a soloist on the radio series Stardust and in many CBC recitals during those years. In 1961 he joined the faculty of the University of Toronto where he founded the Canadian String Quartet (active from 1961 to 1963), and taught violinist Campbell Trowsdale. He left there in 1964 to join the faculty of Brandon University, where he taught through 1966. From 1966 to 1969 he was concertmaster of the Buffalo Philharmonic Orchestra where he occasionally filled in as conductor. He also gave many recitals during the 1950s and 1960s, often with his sister Frances Pratz or pianist Leo Barkin accompanying.

In 1969 Pratz returned to the Toronto Symphony Orchestra and a year later was appointed acting concertmaster. He was given the post of full concertmaster in 1971, remaining in that role until his retirement due to ill health in 1979. During those years he was a frequent soloist with the TSO and actively performed in many Toronto studio orchestras for recordings of film scores, commercial albums, and jingles. He was also active as a teacher both privately and with the National Youth Orchestra of Canada. Some of his notable students are Dean Franke, Carol Lynn Fujino, Raymond Gniewek, Myron Moskalyk, Lenny Solomon, and comedian Jack Benny. He lived in Florida and then California after his retirement, and died in Scottsdale, Arizona in 1995 at the age of 80.
