= Hermann Scherchen =

German conductor (1891-1966)

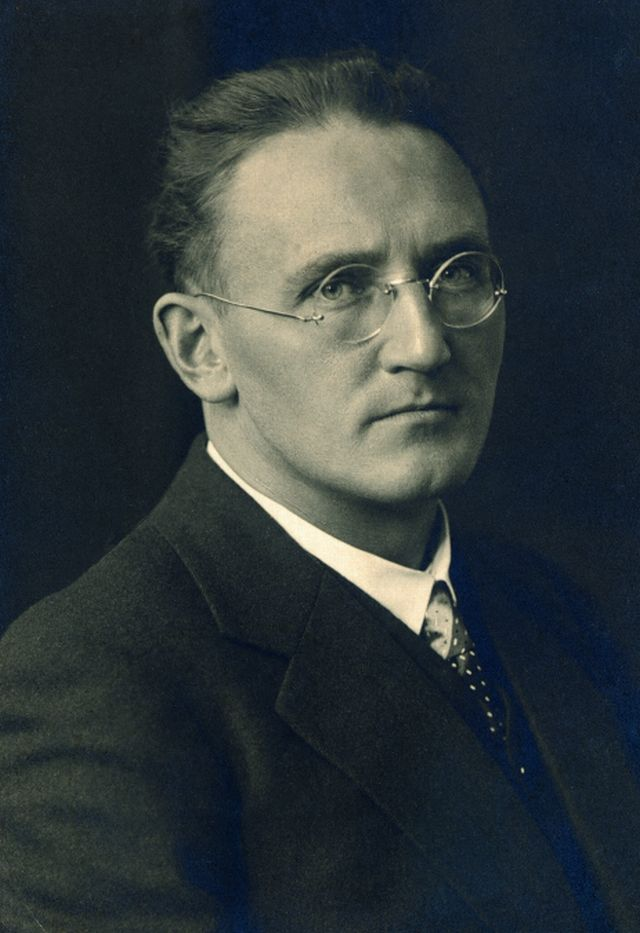
- Born: 21 June 1891; Berlin
- Died: 12 June 1966 (aged 74); Florence
- Occupation: Conductor

Hermann Scherchen (21 June 1891 – 12 June 1966) was a German conductor, who was principal conductor of the city orchestra of Winterthur from 1922 to 1950. He promoted contemporary music, beginning with Schoenberg's Pierrot Lunaire, followed by works by Richard Strauss, Anton Webern, Alban Berg, Edgard Varèse, later Iannis Xenakis, Luigi Nono and Leon Schidlowsky. He usually conducted without using a baton.

== Life ==
Scherchen was born in Berlin. Originally a violist, he played among the violas of the Bluthner Orchestra of Berlin while still in his teens. He conducted in Riga from 1914 to 1916 and in Königsberg from 1928 to 1933, after which he left Germany in protest of the new Nazi regime and worked in Switzerland. Along with the philanthropist Werner Reinhart, Scherchen played a leading role in shaping the musical life of Winterthur for many years, with numerous premiere performances, the emphasis being placed on contemporary music. From 1922 to 1950, he was the principal conductor of the city orchestra of Winterthur (today known as Orchester Musikkollegium Winterthur).

Making his debut with Schoenberg's Pierrot Lunaire, he was a champion of 20th-century composers such as Richard Strauss, Anton Webern, Alban Berg and Edgard Varèse, and actively promoted the work of younger contemporary composers including Iannis Xenakis, Luigi Nono and Leon Schidlowsky.

He was the teacher of Karel Ančerl, Egisto Macchi, Marc Bélanger, Françoys Bernier, Anna Renfer, Frieda Belinfante and Karl Amadeus Hartmann, and contributed to the libretto of Hartmann's opera Simplicius Simplicissimus. He also premiered Hartmann's early work Miserae. Conductor Francis Travis was a pupil, then conducting assistant, for five years.

He is probably best known for his orchestral arrangement (and recording) of Bach's The Art of Fugue. His 1929 "Lehrbuch des Dirigierens" (Treatise on Conducting, ISBN 3-7957-2780-4) is a standard textbook.

== Technique ==
Like Vasily Safonov and (in later life) Leopold Stokowski, Scherchen commonly avoided the use of a baton. His technique when in this mode sometimes caused problems for players; an unidentified BBC Symphony Orchestra bassoonist told the singer Ian Wallace that interpreting Scherchen's minuscule hand movements was like trying to milk a flying gnat. According to Fritz Spiegl, Scherchen worked largely through verbal instructions to his players and his scores were peppered with reminders of what he needed to say at each critical point in the music.

However, Scherchen did not always dispense with the baton. The film of his rehearsal of his edition of Bach's The Art of Fugue with the CBC Toronto Chamber Orchestra shows him using a baton throughout.

== Family ==
Scherchen's first wife – who was also his third wife – was Auguste Marie (Gustl) Jansen, whom he married on 17 June 1921. After a brief marriage to actress Gerda Müller from 1927 to 1929, he was again together with Gustl Jansen. In 1936, Scherchen married the Chinese composer Xiao Shuxian in Peking (Beijing). A daughter, Tona Scherchen, was born to them in 1938. She has also made a name for herself as a composer. The last of his five wives was the Zurich-based Romanian mathematics teacher Pia Andronescu, with whom he had five children: Myriam, David, Esther, Nathan and Alexandra.

He died in Florence, survived by a number of children from five wives and other women.

One of his sons was Karl Hermann "Wulff" Scherchen. Wulff met Benjamin Britten when they were thirteen (nearly fourteen) and twenty, respectively. Their romantic relationship did not begin until four years later. John Bridcut describes the passionate exchanges of letters between the increasingly-famous composer and the teenager in Britten's Children. Wulff's relationship with Britten is also the subject of Serenade for Tenor, Saxophone and Orchestra, a song cycle by Lyle Chan based on the romantic letters exchanged by the pair.

Until 2014, his daughter, Myriam Scherchen, co-ran the music label Tahra, which released officially authorized historical recordings of conductors such as Scherchen, Furtwängler, Mengelberg and others, generally drawn from primary recorded sources. Tahra ceased business after the death of the co-principal of the label, René Trémine.

The sister of Auguste Maria Jansen, Helene (Lene) Jansen, was married to the Hungarian cartographer Alexander Radó, who, under the alias 'Dora', was a member of the European-wide resistance organization known as the "Rote Kapelle". When Radó was threatened in Switzerland by German security agents and faced eviction, Hermann Scherchen hid him in his apartment in Geneva.

== Quote ==
- "Music does not have to be understood. It has to be listened to." ("Musik muss nicht verstanden werden. Sie muss gehört werden.")

== Recordings ==
Scerchen's recorded repertoire was extremely wide, ranging from the baroque to the contemporary, from Vivaldi to Reinhold Glière. His Mahler recordings, made before Mahler became a part of the standard repertoire, were especially influential; so too were his recordings of Bach and Handel, which helped pave the way for the period-performance practice movement. Included as well were significant recordings of music by Haydn, Beethoven, Berlioz, Tchaikovsky, Glière, Bartók, Schoenberg and many others.

- In 1953 Scherchen made the first commercial recording of Mahler's 7th Symphony with the Orchestra of the Vienna State Opera. (Westminster WAL 211.) Surviving live recordings of Mahler's 3rd and 7th Symphonies by Scherchen from 1950 pre-date the earliest commercial recordings of both symphonies.
- In 1959, Hermann Scherchen recorded Handel's Messiah, with Pierrette Alarie, soprano, Nan Merriman, contralto, Leopold Simoneau, tenor and Richard Standen, bass. (Westminster XWL 3306, WST 306)
- In 1959, Hermann Scherchen recorded Bach's Mass in B minor, with Pierrette Alarie, soprano, Nan Merriman, contralto, Leopold Simoneau, tenor and Gustav Neidlinger, bass. (Westminster WST 304)
- In 1960, Hermann Scherchen recorded works by Max Reger with alto Margarethe Bence and the Nordwestdeutsche Philharmonie, including Eine Lustspielouvertüre (A Comedy Overture), Serenade for orchestra, Romantic Suite for orchestra, "An die Hoffnung", Variations and Fugue on a Theme of Beethoven and Variations and Fugue on a Theme by Mozart.
- In 1996, Tahra published the only commercially released recording of Malipiero's complete L'Orfeide. It was a remastered live recording of the 7 June 1966 performance at the Teatro della Pergola in Florence, conducted by Scherchen only five days before his death. The cast included Magda Olivero and Renato Capecchi (Tah 190/191).

Other recordings:

- Labrande, Christian; Bach, Johann Sebastian; Scherchen, Hermann; Canadian Broadcasting Corporation <Ottawa>. Symphony Orchestra (1994), Hermann Scherchen, [Erscheinungsort nicht ermittelbar]: La Sept, OCLC 699596875
- Scherchen, Hermann (2011), Hermann Scherchen : enregistrements "live" inédits (in French), [S.l.], [S.l.]: Tahra Harmonia mundi, Vertrieb, OCLC 1073305929
- Scherchen, Hermann; Bach, Johann Sebastian; Mozart, Wolfgang Amadeus; Beethoven, Ludwig van; Gliėr, Rejngolʹd Moricevič; Brahms, Johannes; Čajkovskij, Pëtr Ilʹič; Rimskij-Korsakov, Nikolaj; Borodin, Aleksandr Porfirʹevič; Mahler, Gustav; Honegger, Arthur; Stravinsky, Igor; Haydn, Joseph; Alarie, Pierrette; Merriman, Nan; Simoneau, Léopold; Neidlinger, Gustav; Rössl-Majdan, Hilde; Stader, Maria; Peerce, Jan; Wiener, Otto; Wiener Akademie-Kammerchor; Wiener Symphoniker; English Baroque Orchestra; Royal Philharmonic Orchestra (2015), The art of Hermann Scherchen, [Waldron, Heathfield, England]: Scribendum Argento, OCLC 1078666934
- Bach, Johann Sebastian; Scherchen, Hermann; Wiener Symphoniker; Österreichischer Rundfunk<Wien>. Großes Orchester (1997), Die Kunst der Fuge, BWV 1080 new version & instrumentation: Hermann Scherchen = The art of the fugue (in German), [S.l]: Universal Music International, OCLC 812407502
- Beethoven, Ludwig van; Scherchen, Hermann, Hermann Scherchen prova e dirige : Beethoven : Sinfonia No. 5 (in Italian), [S.l.]: Ermitage, OCLC 636346721
