= Alicia Crossley =

Australian recorder player

- Genres: classical

Alicia Crossley is an Australian recorder player. She was nominated for the 2020 ARIA Awards for Best Classical Album for her album Muse. Muse was recorded with the Acacia Quartet and contained songs composed by Lyle Chan, Anne Boyd, Chris Williams, Stephen Yates, Jessica Wells and Sally Whitwell

== Discography ==
=== Albums ===
List of albums, with selected details
Title	Details
Alchemy	Released: April 2015; Format: CD, Digital; Label: Move
Muse (with Acacia Quartet)	Released: November 2018; Format: CD, Digital; Label: Move
Addicted to Bass	Released: March 2020; Format: CD, Digital; Label: Move
Bass Instincts	Released: September 2021; Format: CD, Digital; Label: Move

== Awards and nominations ==
=== ARIA Music Awards ===
The ARIA Music Awards are presented annually from 1987 by the Australian Recording Industry Association (ARIA).

Year	Nominee / work	Award	Result	Ref.
2020	Muse (with Acacia Quartet)	Best Classical Album	Nominated	
