= Young Apollo =

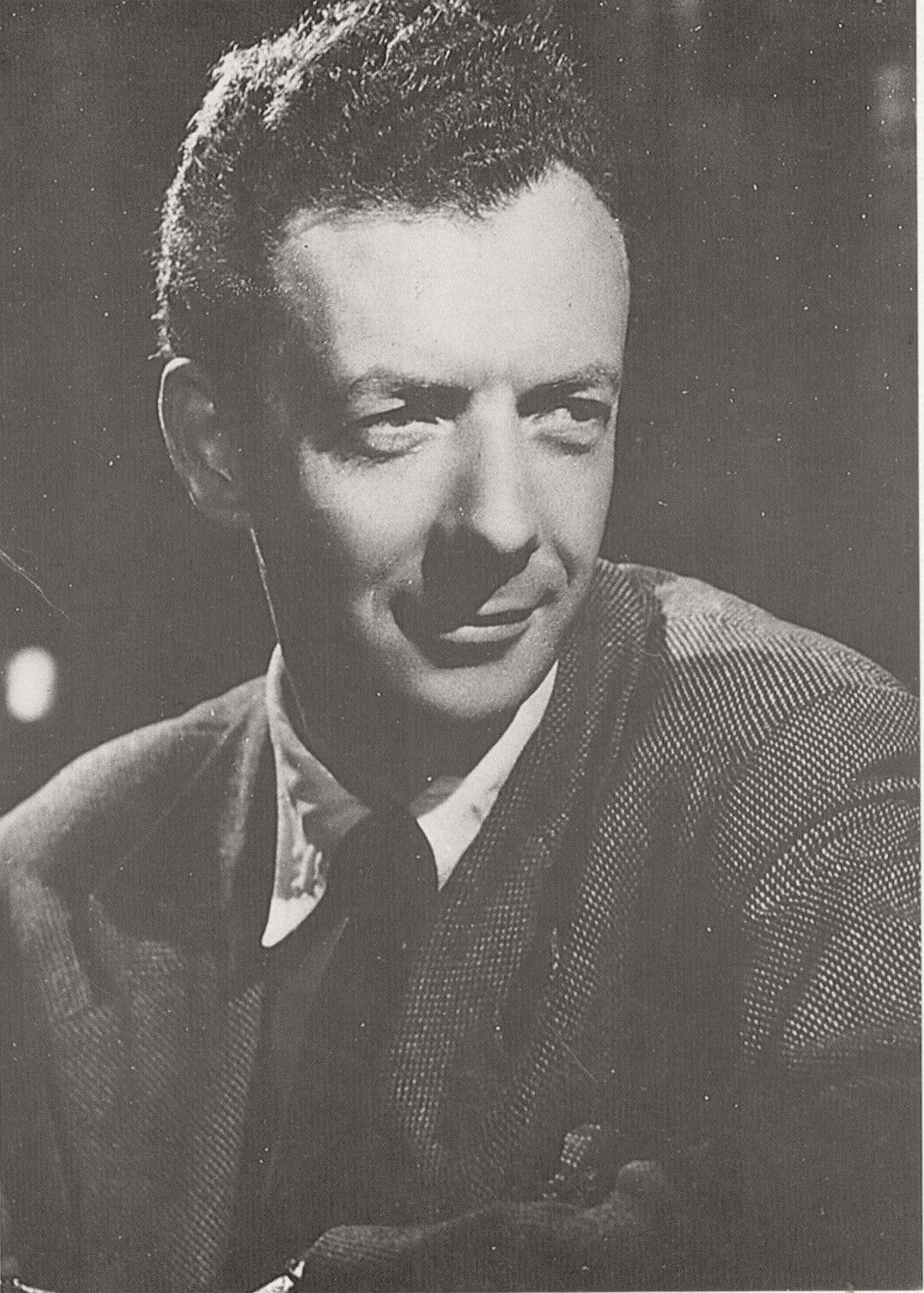
Benjamin Britten in the 1940s

Young Apollo, Op. 16, is a music composition for piano, string quartet and string orchestra composed in 1939 by Benjamin Britten.

Following a performance of Britten's Variations on a Theme of Frank Bridge on the Canadian Broadcasting Corporation's Melodic Strings program on 18 June 1939 (which Britten attended), John Adaskin commissioned Britten for a work. It is the earliest known autonomous musical work to have been commissioned by the CBC.

The work premiered on 27 August 1939 on an episode of CBC Radio's Melodic Strings, along with other new compositions by Carl Busch (an arrangement of My Old Kentucky Home) and Frederick Bye (Puppets Suite in Four Parts). Britten was soloist and Alexander Chuhaldin conducted. Britten dedicated the work to Chuhaldin. The composer withdrew the work following a second performance on 20 December in New York, without explanation. It was not performed again until 1979 when it was revived at that year's Aldeburgh Festival, with Steuart Bedford conducting the English Chamber Orchestra and Michael Roll as soloist.

It carries as an epigraph the final lines of "Hyperion", an incomplete poem by John Keats but the work was inspired by Wulff Scherchen, a young, German blond who was Britten's first love interest.

Young Apollo was first commercially recorded in 1982, with Peter Donohoe as soloist, and the City of Birmingham Symphony Orchestra under Simon Rattle.
