= AIDS Memoir Quartet =

2014 musical composition by Lyle Chan

String Quartet: An AIDS Activist's Memoir in Music, commonly abbreviated to AIDS Memoir Quartet, is a musical composition by composer Lyle Chan which premiered in 2014. The work has been exclusively performed by the Acacia Quartet.

The work chronicles Chan's 6 years as an HIV/AIDS activist at the height of the epidemic in Australia, including importing experimental medications from Los Angeles to Sydney. It is the longest string quartet ever written in Australia.

== About ==
The 90-minute work was sketched in the during the years 1991-1996, but only completed some 20 years later. It contains reflections of historic events, portraits of famous activist friends now dead, and unusual effects like the use of police whistles to recall street demonstrations by ACT UP, the direct action protest group of which Lyle Chan was a core member. In those crisis years, he and fellow activists couriered AIDS treatments from the US that were unavailable in Australia, fiercely lobbied federal government to approve experimental treatments more quickly, and collaborated with drug companies to design clinical trials of promising new treatments.

The Melbourne Recital Centre, one of the first presenters of the work, states, "This work tells the story of how activists transformed a stigmatized, fatal disease. Like the autobiographical quartets of Steve Reich or Shostakovich, Lyle Chan's AIDS memoir is in turn harrowing and touching but ultimately an intensely uplifting story of a community that fought against all odds for their lives and won."

"Activism is an attempt to reach some kind of normality", he reflected in a 2014 interview, "that you feel is being denied for some reason. Once it became clear, between 1994 and 1996, that we were no longer fighting against a constant backdrop of death, it became possible to imagine a future where every day was not a state of emergency."

Asked about the message of the work, he replied, "I don't have an overt 'message', aside from the message that we all should bring beauty into the world, in our deeds and in our relationships. Sometimes, there are obstacles to be overcome in order to do that. For two decades, AIDS was one such obstacle to beauty and love."

A typical complete performance lasts 2 hours, without interval. In performance, Lyle Chan speaks onstage between sections of the music – a narrative entirely from memory, telling vivid stories about the events and people of this era.

== Structure ==
The work is made up of 17 sections played continuously, lasting approximately 90 minutes. In performances where the composer narrates between sets of music, the entire show lasts 2 hours without any breaks. It is the longest string quartet ever written in Australia.

1. In September The Light Changes
2. ACT UP, Part 1
3. ACT UP, Part 2
4. Dextran Man, Part 1
5. Mark and Adrian Are Her Sons, Part 1
6. Mark and Adrian Are Her Sons, Part 2
7. Mark and Adrian Are Her Sons, Part 3
8. Dextran Man, Part 2
9. Et tu Bruce
10. Night Vigil
11. After Night Vigil
12. Dextran Man, Part 3
13. Tony-ony Macaroni, Part 1
14. Tony-ony Macaroni, Part 2
15. Don't Leave Me This Way
16. Towards Elysium
17. Fairy Tale Ending

== Notable performances ==
Organised by the presenter Music By The Sea, the world premiere performance of the entire work took place on 5 July 2014 at the Sandgate Town Hall in Brisbane, Australia.

The Sydney premiere occurred on 18 July of the same year, organised by the Australian Broadcasting Corporation as a live broadcast concert from its Eugene Goossens Hall in Ultimo. Preceding the performance, ABC Classic FM's presenter Julian Day interviewed the composer on air amid breaking news that Malaysian Airlines flight MH17 had been shot down over Ukraine while carrying passengers destined for the 20th International AIDS Conference that was to be held in Melbourne only a few days later. The performance was dedicated to those killed on Flight MH17 and their loved ones. At the time of the broadcast, a large number of international media reports claimed that over 100 of the passengers were conference delegates. It was subsequently confirmed that the true number of conference delegates on the flight was 6, but it included the scientist Dr Joep Lange, known for his pioneering research on combination therapy to treat HIV infection.

Melbourne Recital Centre organised a complete performance in conjunction with the 20th International AIDS Conference on 23 July 2014.

The North American premiere took place on 22 June 2016 in Vancouver, Canada, at the invitation of Pride In Art Society for its annual Queer Arts Festival.

Other notable performances

Along with Dextran Man, Part 1, the 14-minute section Don't Leave Me This Way was performed at the National Gallery of Victoria's exhibition When This You See Remember Me, a retrospective of the work of artist David McDiarmid. This section relates to the underground drug trials that Chan helped organise and in particular tells the story of how the experimental lipid amphotericin was obtained to treat McDiarmid's lymphoma. Chan was one of McDiarmid's medical carers in the year leading to the artist's death from AIDS-related complications in May 1995. The performance was preceded by a 40-minute conversation between the composer and Justice Michael Kirby on stage.

Several excerpts were performed by Acacia Quartet on the Global Village stage of the 2014 International AIDS conference.

== Reception ==
The Quartet has met with widespread critical and audience acclaim.

In its review, The Age described the work as "triumphantly articulating a story of humanity amid the gloom of disaster ... sometimes words can fail to adequately describe what one witnesses."

Limelight Magazine called it "A crushingly powerful work of musical history ... A towering piece."

SBS newscaster Anton Enus wrote in his personal Twitter account: "Impressive, admirable, so very moving."

Renowned American composer John Corigliano said, "Lyle Chan's string quartet is a very ambitious work born out of a seemingly endless plague. Its composer has taken his experiences of living through the enormous tragedy of AIDS and from them has molded a serious and deeply felt work of art."

The work was the subject of a half-page feature article in The Australian.

In December 2015, LA Weekly contacted Lyle Chan to obtain permission to quote the AIDS Memoir Quartet's program notes about Jim Corti (the real identity of 'Dextran Man' referred to in the music), stating "Chan's post is a fascinating chronicle of what people were willing to do to be of service to a cause, including manufacturing caplets of ddC ("the most illegal thing Jim had ever done") when the FDA refused to approve it and the pharmaceutical companies refused to expand clinical trials. In a second post, Chan recalls when the supply of ddC was interrupted by the '92 L.A. riots — Corti, who was white, lived in South Central."

== Manuscript ==
Pages from the original manuscript are held at the University of British Columbia's Rare Books and Special Collections.
