= Xiao Shuxian =

Chinese composer and music educator (1905–1991)

Xiao Shuxian (Simplified Chinese: 萧淑娴; Traditional Chinese: 蕭淑嫻; Pinyin: Xiāo Shúxián; sometimes spelled Hsiao Shu-sien) (April 4, 1905 – November 26, 1991) was a Chinese composer and music educator.

== Life ==
Xiao was born in Tianjin into a highly cultural Chinese family, some of her relatives were known people in Chinese history. After a period of music studying in China, she went to the Royal Conservatory at Brussels, winning a prize there in 1932. From 1935 to 1954 she was married to Hermann Scherchen, a conductor; their daughter, Tona Scherchen, became a composer. Xiao spent 14 years working in Switzerland, where she helped to promote Chinese culture with her music and writing. Her 1938 Chinese Children's Suite for voice and piano was among the first works by a Chinese composer to become known in the West, as was her suite for orchestra, Huainian Zuguo (A Commemoration of My Homeland).

In 1950, motivated by a desire to help her homeland's development, and a wish to have a career of her own, Xiao returned to China with her three children, not knowing that she herself would not be able to see her husband ever again. From then until her death she taught in Beijing at the Central Conservatory. A substantial number of today's successful Chinese composers benefitted from her teaching, and among them recollections of Xiao is vivid. Her value as a teacher depended on the fact that she was among the earliest Chinese who had first-hand experience in Western art music, as well as all sorts of compositional techniques. Yet, her role as a composer was largely ignored, as during the most of her lifetime a self-dependent composer was impossible in China. It was not until a few years before her death that finally a concert consisting entirely of her own music were given in the Conservatory, followed by the publication of scores. In addition to her work as a teacher and composer, she translated various texts on Western musical thought into Chinese.

She died in Beijing.

== Musical style ==
In a limited compositional output, Xiao's style combines elements of Chinese folk culture with traditional Western techniques. She developed it mainly through teaching polyphony in the 1950s. Most of her works are written for small mediums such as vocal and piano solo music. The best among them, for example, the Piano Sonatina, can be described as having a neo-classical style.
