= Monteith Correctional Complex =

Prison in Ontario, Canada

- Interactive map of Monteith Correctional Complex
- Location: Monteith, Ontario, Canada; 48.6415°N 80.6775°W
- Status: Operational
- Security class: Medium/Maximum
- Capacity: 232
- Opened: 1938
- Managed by: Ministry of the Solicitor General

The Monteith Correctional Complex is a medium/maximum security prison located in Monteith, a community in Iroquois Falls, Ontario.

During World War II, Monteith Correctional Complex detained captured German soldiers, and was known as POW Camp 23.

== See also ==
- List of correctional facilities in Ontario
