= The Prince and the Composer =

Film

The Prince and the Composer: A Film about Hubert Parry by HRH The Prince of Wales is a 2011 documentary film presented by Charles III, the then-Prince of Wales, about the music and life of the composer Sir Hubert Parry. The documentary was directed by John Bridcut and was first broadcast on BBC Four on 27 May 2011.

In the film, Charles explores his love of Parry's music, explaining that there is much more to the composer than "Jerusalem" and "I was glad", as he travels around Britain retracing places that were important to the composer and discovering more about the man and his works. In the film, he travels to significant places in Parry's life; Highnam Court, Shulbrede Priory and hears performances of his lesser-known works such as a rare performance of his Fifth Symphony at the BBC Proms.
