= David Zafer =

Canadian violinist and pedagogue

- Born: April 2, 1934; London, England
- Died: April 20, 2019 (aged 85); Toronto, Canada
- Occupations: Violinist, pedagogue

David Zafer (April 2, 1934 – April 20, 2019) was a Canadian violinist and pedagogue. He was born in London, England, and moved to Canada in 1947.

== Background ==
In England, David Zafer studied with his father and at the RCM with Antonio Brosa. He moved to Canada in 1947 and continued his studies in Toronto with Elie Spivak and Albert Pratz at The Royal Conservatory of Music in Toronto. From 1966 to 1999 he was a Professor of Violin in the Faculty of Music at the University of Toronto, where he became professor emeritus.

Zafer performed with the Toronto Symphony Orchestra from 1956 to 1959, the Baltimore Symphony Orchestra as assistant concertmaster 1960-61, and orchestra of the National Ballet of Canada as concertmaster from 1961 to 1964.

He founded the Chamber Orchestra at the University of Toronto, and directed it until his retirement.

David Zafer gave master classes in schools such as the Menuhin School in Surrey (England), the Meadowmount Summer School, the University of British Columbia, and Rice University in Houston, Texas. Also he directed the European Seminary of Strings in Budapest and he has given master lessons in Prague.

In 1998, Mr. Zafer conducted the Real Chamber Orchestra of Seoul (Korea) and this concert was nationally televised there. For 25 years he has been titular conductor and violin professor of the Toronto Symphony Youth Orchestra and he has made tours with this orchestra to the Young Orchestras Festivals in Aberdeen, Scotland, Boston and Banff.

In 1997, he recorded a CD with the Toronto Symphony Youth Orchestra during a live performance in the Ford Center for the Performing Arts of Toronto. At the present time, he gives private classes and he continues to perform with different orchestras and chamber music groups and at various festivals.

His later project was the Toronto Chamber Youth Orchestra, of very recent creation.
