= Jindřich Feld =

Czech composer

Jindřich Feld (19 February 1925 in Prague, Czechoslovakia – 8 July 2007 in Prague, Czech Republic) was a Czech composer of classical music.

Feld was born into a musical family, his father a well-known professor of violin at the Prague Conservatory which followed the tradition of Otakar Ševčík, the master of Jan Kubelík. His mother was a violinist. While he studied violin and viola with his father, he began studying composition early, studying at the Prague Conservatory and then graduating from the Academy of Music (HAMU) in 1952. In this year, he also earned his doctorate from the Charles University in Prague, with degrees in musicology, aesthetics and philosophy.

In 1968 and 1969, Feld accepted an invitation to be a Guest Professor of Composition at Adelaide University in Australia. He also continued to teach at the Prague Conservatory, where he was Professor of Composition from 1972 until 1986. He was a guest lecturer at Indiana University in Bloomington, Indiana in 1981 and 1984. His teaching has also taken him to positions at other American universities as well as ones in Denmark, Norway, Germany, France, England, and 1991 in Japan. Among his notable students are Ivan Romanoff and Martin Wesley-Smith.

== Musical career ==
The American musicologist, Dr Lana Kay Johns (her annotated bibliography), has counted more than two hundred titles (a cataloging system referred to here as J). It includes compositions from an opera for children (The Postman's Tale, 1956) to partitions with full scores for orchestra, as well as the cantata Cosmae Chronica Boemorum, 1988) in the tradition of Dvořák on a medieval text. His Symphony n°3, "The End of the Century", was premiered in Prague in 1998.

Numerous works of chamber music as well as choral works have suggestive titles, such as Three Inventions or Mockery about Names, for female choir, and Laus Cantus for soprano voice and string quartet (1985, to the memory of J.S. Bach), Gloria Cantus or Three Inventions for mixed chorus, or Nonsense Rhymes for women's chorus and small instrumental ensemble, in direct line with the Říkadla (Nursery rhymes) of Janáček.

One of his internationally best-known compositions is the Concerto for flute and orchestra, written in 1954. Jean-Pierre Rampal commissioned this concerto and performed it in multiple concerts, and recorded it. The Sonata for flute (1957) is a standard piece in the repertoire of all virtuosos. Rampal ordered the very elaborate and the virtuoso Fantasy Concertante for flute, string quartet and percussion instruments, which was first performed in Paris in 1980 (required work for his First International Flute Competition).

Feld forged aesthetic guidelines during more than half a century of activity and admitted having initially felt close to Martinů, but even more to the French school of Debussy to Messiaen, including Honegger. He felt akin with the more French side of Stravinsky and Prokofiev as well as the ethnic side of Bartók.

== Selected works ==
=== Orchestral ===
- Three symphonies (1966–67, 1983, 1994–8)
- Sinfonietta (2001) "Pour les temps d'harmonie"
- Concertos
  - For flute (1954), cello (1958), bassoon (1959), oboe (1970), piano (1973), trombone (1975), accordion (1975), violin (1977), saxophone (1980), harp (1982), and viola (2003–4, J.208)
- Concerto for chamber orchestra (1957)

=== Chamber music ===
- Six string quartets (1949, 1952, 1962, 1965 J. 61, 1979 J. 126, 1993 J.181)
  - String trio (by 1966)
- Rhapsody for organ (1963)
- String quintet (quartet + viola) (1972)
- Wind quintets (1949, 1968)
- Brass quintet (c. 1972)
- Quintet for Saxophone (or Clarinet) and Strings J. 194 (1999)
- Sonatas
  - Viola and piano (1955)
  - Flute and piano (1957)
  - Bassoon and piano sonatina (1969)
  - Clarinet and piano sonatina (1970)
  - Piano (1971-2)
  - Cello and piano (1972)
  - Guitar (1974)
  - Oboe and piano (1982)
  - Violin and piano (1985)
  - Alto saxophone and piano (1989–90)
  - Piccolo and Piano (2005)

=== Other chamber works ===
- Cello and piano : two compositions (Elegy and Burlesque) J. 22 (1954–1955)
- Rhapsody for violin and piano (1956)
- Five inventions for two flutes (1975)
- Toccata and Passacaglia for harp (1976)
- Two Dances (Danse lyrique – Danse barbare) for flute and guitar (1975)
- Trio for oboe, clarinet and bassoon (1987)
- Suite rapsodica for alto saxophone (1992)
