= Frank Bergeron =

Canadian ice hockey player (1927–2020)

- Born: February 6, 1927 Ansonville, Ontario, Canada
- Died: May 4, 2020 (aged 93)
- Height: 6 ft 1 in (185 cm)
- Weight: 175 lb (79 kg; 12 st 7 lb)
- Position: Defense
- Shot: Left
- Played for: Buffalo Bisons; Springfield Indians; Syracuse Warriors; San Francisco Shamrocks; Minneapolis Millers
- Playing career: 1946–1967

Frank B. Bergeron (February 6, 1927 - May 4, 2020) was a Canadian professional hockey player who played for the Buffalo Bisons, Springfield Indians and Syracuse Warriors in the American Hockey League. He also played in the Pacific Coast Hockey League for the San Francisco Shamrocks, in the United States Hockey League for the Minneapolis Millers, and in the Maritime Major Hockey League.
