= Tona Scherchen =

Tona Scherchen, also Tona Scherchen-Hsiao (Simplified Chinese: 萧桐; born 12 March 1938), is one of the first composers who brought Chinese elements into European avant-garde art music.

== Life ==
Tona Scherchen was born into a musical family in Neuchâtel. Her father was conductor Hermann Scherchen and her mother was composer Xiao Shuxian. She spent the first 12 years of her life in Europe, particularly in Switzerland. She arrived in China in 1950 with her mother and her older sister Féfé. In 1956, just a year before China fell into political chaos, she returned to Europe to be with her father in order to pursue further music education. Her teachers included György Ligeti and Hans Werner Henze.

After the 1960s, Scherchen had become an active composer, titles of her music were frequently seen in contemporary music programmes. Her works were published by prominent publishers, and several articles on her as a composer can be found, although after some appearances in 1980s, she seemingly ceased to catch attention beyond her French circle.

== Music ==
Scherchen's music is an adaption of the avant-garde idioms of the European 1960s, '70s, synthesized with a language of her own. Many of her compositions bear Chinese titles, but the influence of Chinese arts and thoughts is more conceptual than literal. The only exception is Yi, a suite for one marimba with two players, in which she recalled folk tunes heard in her Chinese years. It is a moving piece, dedicated to her mother, whom Tona probably was not able to meet for three decades due to the political situation.

Several recordings of Tona's works have been commercially issued, but today only Lo for trombone and strings, and Shen for six percussionists, can be found on CD, despite all her music being available in print.

== Selected works ==
Her publishers include Universal Edition, Boosey & Hawkes, Alfred Peschek and Amphion.

Orchestra

- Tzang for chamber orchestra (1966)
- Khouang (1966–1968) UE
- Vague T'ao, "Plusieurs silences" d'une grande vague déchainée (1974–1975) UE
- S.... (1975) UE
- Oeil de chat (1st Cycle) (1976–1977) BH
- L'invitation au voyage for chamber orchestra (1979) BH
- L'illégitime for orchestra and tape (1986)

Concertante

- Tao for viola solo and orchestra (1971–1972) UE/MPH
- Lo for trombone solo and 12 stringed instruments (1978–1979) BH

Chamber music

- In for flute solo (1966) Peschek
- Sin for flute solo (oriental flute if possible) with percussion (1 player) (1967) Peschek
- Shen (神), ou, à propos des battements du cœur humain, New Ballet for percussion (1968) UE
- Sund for oboe, trumpet, trombone, 2 celli, percussion (1968) UE
- Tzoue (醉), trio (clarinet, cello, harpsichord) (1970) UE
- Bien (Mutations) for 12 instrumentalists (1973) UE
- Lien (恋) for viola solo (1973) UE
- Tjao-Houen for chamber ensemble (1973) UE
- Yi (忆), 7 Brief Images for marimbaphone (2 players) (1973) UE
- Yun-yu (云雨) Clouds and Rain; Nuages et pluie) for violin or viola and vibraphone (1974) UE
- Hsun for percussion quintet UE
- Ziguidor for woodwind quintet (1978) BH
- Escargots volants (Flying Snails) for clarinet solo (1979) Amph
- Once Upon a Time for harp (1979) Amph

Piano

- Radar (1983) Amph

Vocal

- Tzi for 16 voices (SATB) a cappella, diapason and gong grave (1969–1970) UE
- Wai (外) for mezzo-soprano with percussion and string quartet (1967) UE
- Voyage de la larme - (de crocodile) for voice (solo or accompanied) (1979) Amph

== Discography ==
- Shen, Les Percussions de Strasbourg, Philips (1972), also on CD Accord – 480 6512 (2012)
- Yi, Michael Askill, Détlef Kieffer, L'apostrophe 37334 (1973)
- In, Eberhard Blum, Alea, HatHut CD 1997
- Lô, Bob Gillespie, Walk on the Wild Side, SABC CD 2001

== Bibliography ==
Brigitte Schiffer: "Tona Scherchen", Tempo, Jun., 1976, New Series, No. 117 (Jun., 1976), pp. 13-14
