= Alexander Chuhaldin =

Russian composer (1892–1951)

Alexander Gregorovitch Chuhaldin (Russian: Александр Григорьевич Чухалдин) (27 August 1892 – 20 January 1951) was a Russian violinist, conductor, composer, and music educator who later emigrated to Canada. He spent his early career working in his native country but after 1927 he was active in Canada. His compositional output includes over 30 works for string orchestra; many of which were published by Carl Fischer Music. He also composed five pieces for solo violin which were published by Paling & Co in Australia and more recently by Thompson Publishing Group in Canada.

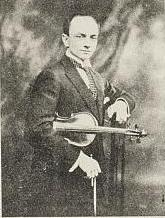
Alexander Chuhaldin 1926/7

== Life and career ==
Born in Vladikavkaz, Chuhaldin was the son of a Tsarist and White Army officer, Gregory Ivanovitch Chuhaldin, stationed there in a Cossack regiment, and of Maria Ivanovna Chuhaldina (née Rasskazova). He was a child prodigy and began studying the violin with Julius Conus at the Moscow Conservatory at just eight years of age.

Chuhaldin gave his first public recital at the age of nine and quickly became active on the concert stage. In 1909 he played in the third stand of first violinists in the Bolshoi Theatre, at the first performance of Le Coq d'Or. In 1913 he joined the orchestra of the Imperial Grand Opera at the Bolshoi Theatre. He eventually served as the ensemble's concertmaster from 1922 to 1924. He joined the faculty of the Moscow Conservatory in 1923 where he remained for two years.

Chuhaldin escaped via Harbin, China, in 1924 with only his violin and the clothes on his back. He gave an extensive recital tour 1925-7, appearing in concerts throughout Asia, Australia, and New Zealand. He met his wife Annette Chuhaldin (née Hillhouse) in Perth and she became his piano accompanist.

In 1927 the Chuhaldins moved to Canada and he began teaching privately and performing in the city of Toronto. He eventually was invited to join the faculty of the Toronto Conservatory of Music, where he taught such notable musicians as Murray Adaskin, Harry Bergart, Isidor Desser, Betty-Ann Fischer-Byfield, Hyman Goodman, Blain Mathé, Albert Pratz, and Ivan Romanoff. In 1928 Charles Comfort painted a portrait of Chuhaldin with his Amati violin (now in the Art Gallery of Hamilton).

He became active as a conductor of radio orchestras, working first with the Canadian Radio Broadcasting Commission during the early 1930s. He then worked extensively for the Canadian Broadcasting Corporation on radio programs like Symphonic Strings, CBC Strings, and Melodic Strings. For the latter program he conducted the world premiere of Benjamin Britten's Young Apollo on 27 August 1939. The performance notably featured Britten at the piano and the composer dedicated the work to Chuhaldin.

Chuhaldin was also active as a guest conductor with several Canadian orchestras, including the Toronto Symphony Orchestra in 1941. He also was a guest conductor with the WPA Civic Symphony in New York City in 1936 and was appointed conductor of the Forest Hill Community Orchestra of Toronto in 1948. Having never retired, he died in Victoria, British Columbia in 1951 at the age of 58. He was survived by his daughter Inna (married name MacDougall). His grandson, William MacDougall, founded MacDougall's, the auction house.
