= Iroquois Falls =

- Town (single-tier)
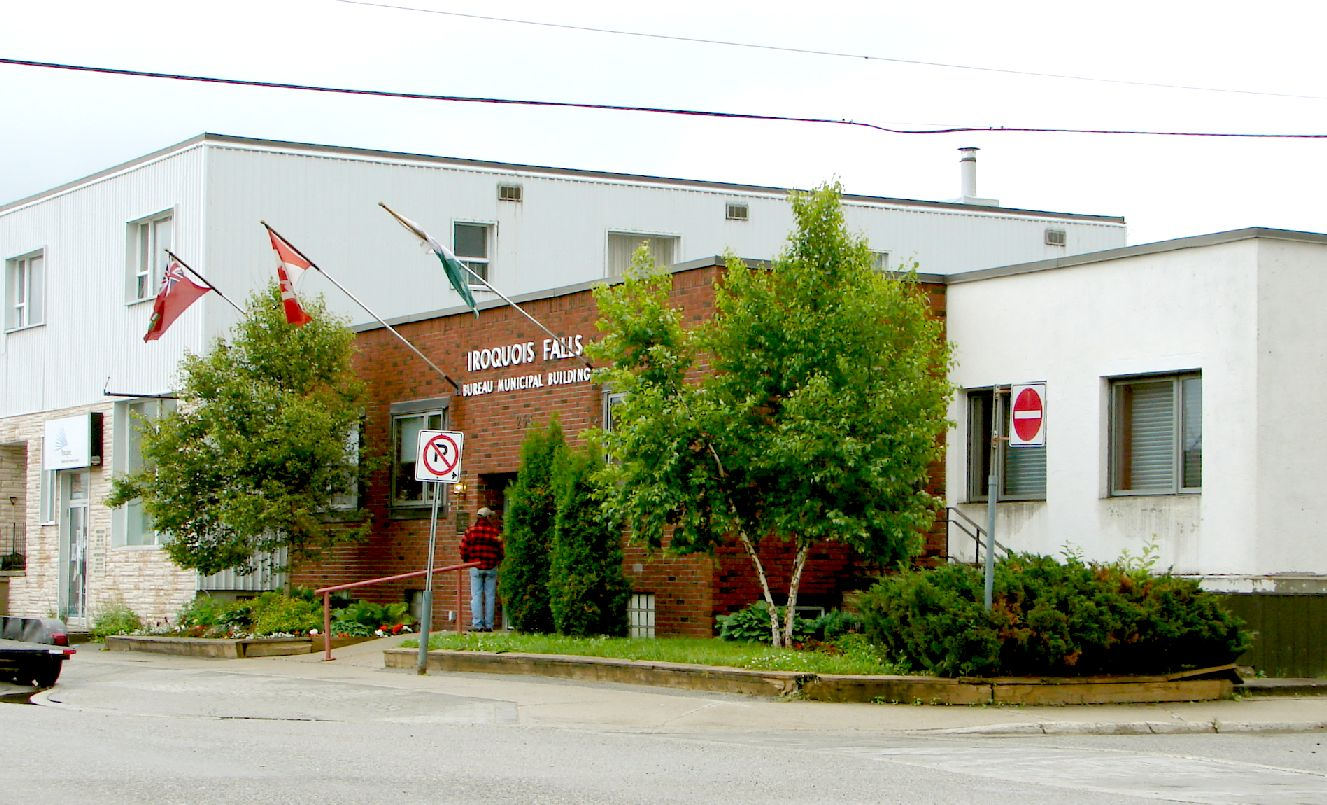
- Iroquois Falls municipal office

- Location within Ontario
- Coordinates: 48°46′N 80°40′W
- Country: Canada
- Province: Ontario
- District: Cochrane
- Established: 1912
- Incorporated: 1915

Government
  - Type: Town
  - Mayor: Tory Delaurier
  - MP: Gaétan Malette (Conservative)
  - MPP: John Vanthof (NDP)

Area
  - Land: 599.03 km^{2} (231.29 sq mi)
  - Urban: 1.56 km^{2} (0.60 sq mi)
- Elevation: 259.1 m (850 ft)

Population (2021)
  - Total: 4,418
  - Density: 7.4/km^{2} (19/sq mi)
  - Urban: 2,866
  - Urban density: 1,834.5/km^{2} (4,751/sq mi)
- Time zone: UTC-5 (EST)
  - Summer (DST): UTC-4 (EDT)
- Postal code FSA: P0K
- Area code(s): 705
- Website: www.iroquoisfalls.com

Iroquois Falls is a town in Northern Ontario, Canada, with a population of 4,418 at the 2021 Canadian census.

The town centre lies 11 kilometres (6.8 mi) east of Highway 11 on the banks of the Abitibi River, west of Lake Abitibi. Timmins, one of the largest cities in northern Ontario, is approximately 70 kilometres (43 mi) to the southwest. The following communities are also within the municipal boundaries: Monteith, Nellie Lake, and Porquis Junction.

Iroquois Falls' primary industry was a large mill producing newsprint and commercial printing papers. In December 2014, the owner, Resolute Forest Products, announced its permanent closure. There are also three hydro-electric dams nearby. The Monteith Correctional Complex, a provincial prison serving a regional catchment area, is located in the community of Monteith (named for Samuel Nelson Monteith).

== History ==
The background of the town's name varies depending on the source, attributing it to invasions by the Iroquois on Huron or Ojibway villages. It is also unclear who has relayed the tale, settlers or the First Nations people themselves.

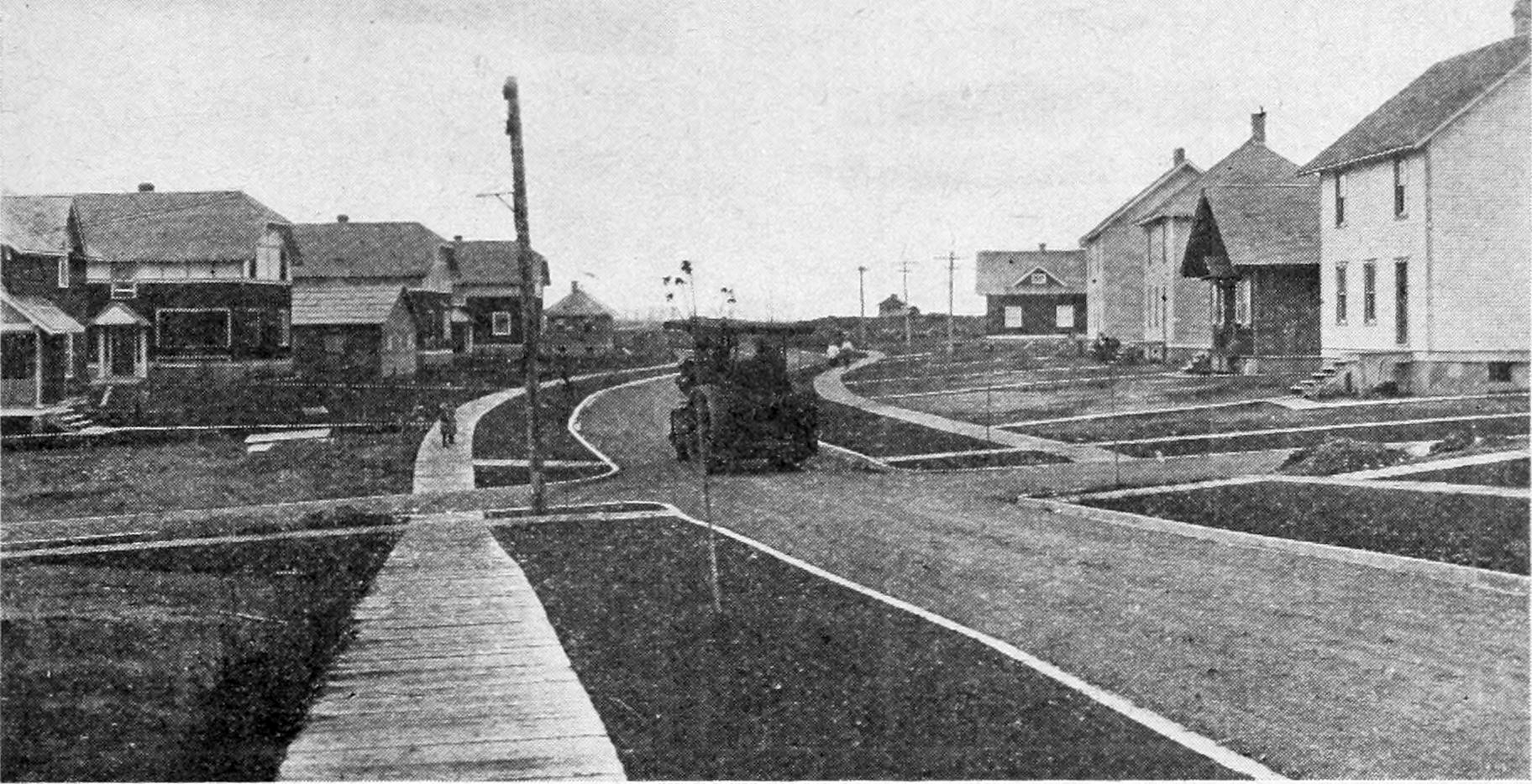
Iroquois Falls, 1917

Iroquois Falls was built as a company town by Frank Harris Anson, owner of the Abitibi Power and Paper Company. Anson had been influenced by the garden city movement of urban planning, and was committed to building an elaborate town. A Chicago architectural firm was hired to design the landscaping and houses, and work crews began clearing land in 1913. The town's park and commercial developments were clearly separated from the paper mill, and the residential streets curved with a focus on the centre of the town. A large church was built, the first English Catholic Parish in Northern Ontario, and today remains a historic landmark. Anson's company town had a hospital, a school, and a company hotel. Employee homes were designed with gambrel roofs to resemble New England farmhouses, and their design and location reflected the employee's rank at the mill. Papermakers lived in double-adjoined homes, while senior managers lived on separate streets in single-family homes.

Much of the town was destroyed by fire in 1916, though Anson continued his beautification program during the 1920s as the community rebuilt.

The town's avant-garde style earned it the nickname "Anson's Folly".

The town was incorporated in 1915, and a board of trade was chartered in 1926.

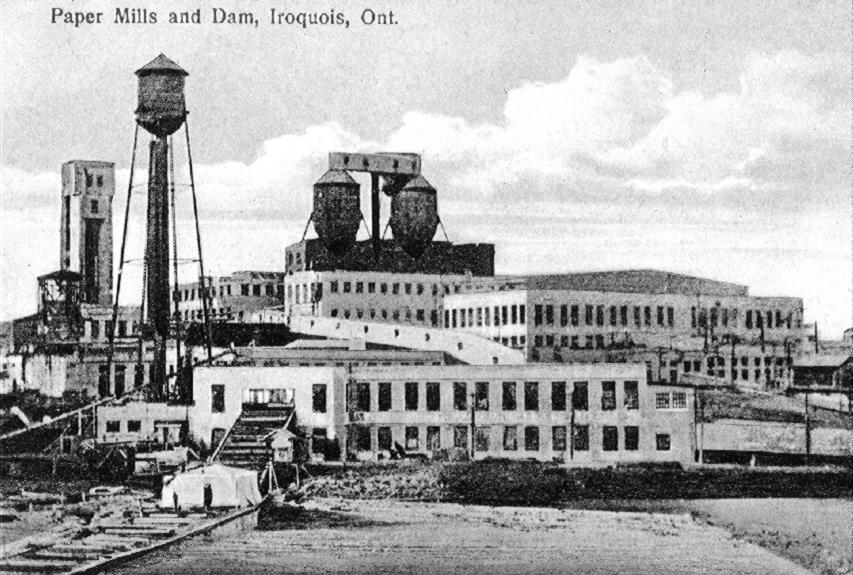
Abitibi paper mill, 1930

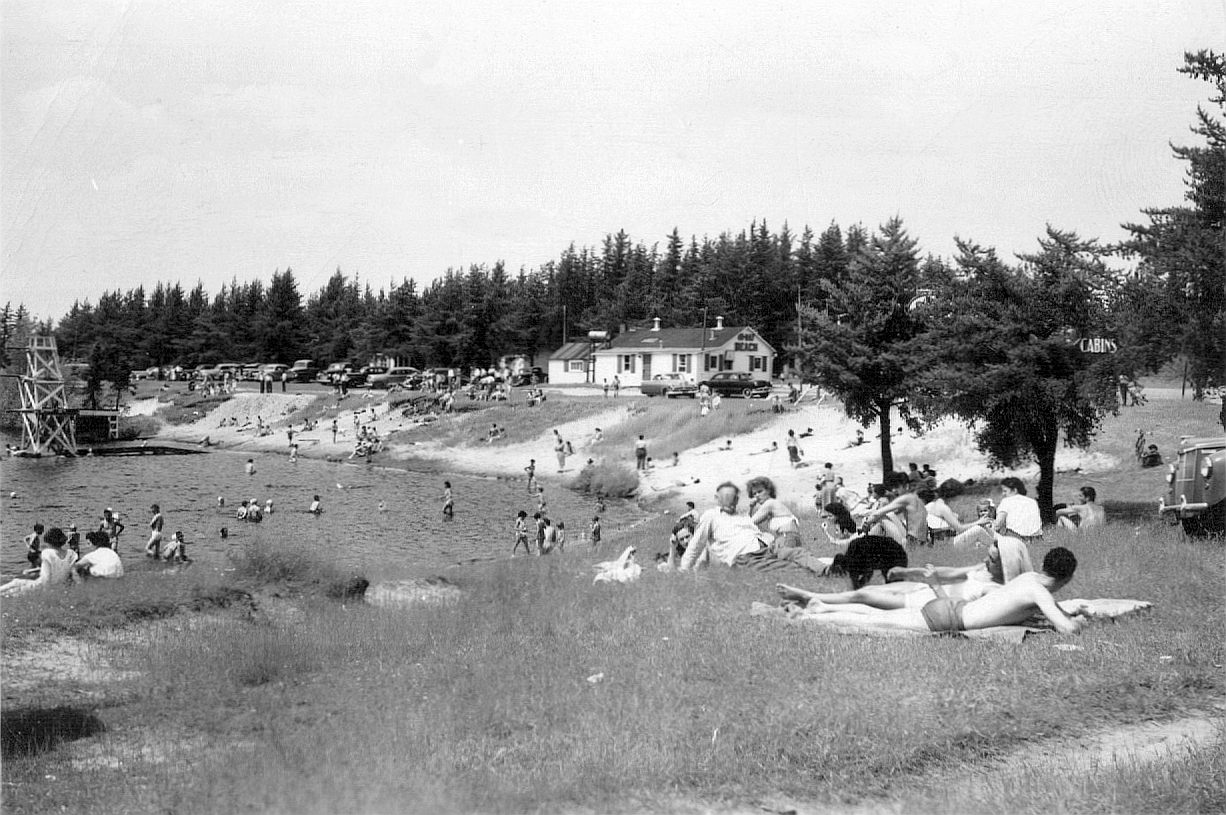
Hi-Way Beach, Nellie Lake, circa 1955

The paper mill created a dramatic change to the area, and people migrated to the community for work.

The creation of the Temiskaming and Northern Ontario Railway (now Ontario Northland Railway) greatly boosted the economy as there were few roads at the time.

As Iroquois Falls grew, two new communities within the town began to emerge. An area known first as "The Wye" (because the rail tracks split at this point) grew to the south, and was at first a ramshackle collection of cabins and shacks. It later became known as Ansonville, and was home to a number of business people and others who were shut out from the company town. In contrast to Iroquois Falls, Ansonville had little town planning, and no water, sewer, or electrical service. Insurance companies would not insure homes there because the risk of fire was too great, and the first residents were French-Canadians, Russians and Ukrainians. Animosity was frequent between Ansonville and Iroquois Falls, and many residents of Iroquois Falls condemned Ansonville "as a dark den of foreigners engaged in regular street brawls, illegal alcohol consumption, and other unsavoury activities"

In 1921, Ansonville began to levy taxes, which led a group of residents to establish a third community named Victoria in the north-west section of the town. The name was later changed to Montrock.

Calvert Township annexed part of Iroquois Falls Town in 1967, and the remainder of the town in 1969, which was renamed to Town of Iroquois Falls on January 1, 1971. In 1979, the three communities were amalgamated into one town named Iroquois Falls.

The paper mill, then called Abitibi-Price, merged with Stone-Consolidated, and then with Donohue Forest Products, and finally with Bowater to create Abitibi-Bowater. On 17 April 2009, Abitibi-Bowater sought bankruptcy protection, emerging from it as Resolute Forest Products.

A tragic event occurred in 1984 at the coffee shop at Joe's Texaco in nearby Porquis Junction. Ontario Provincial Police constable Vern Miller was drinking coffee with his partner constable Norm Tiegen, when 23-year-old Gregg Prevost of Iroquois Falls entered and shot Miller with a shotgun, killing him instantly. The community was shocked and outraged, and Prevost was sentenced to life in prison. The town of Matheson renamed their local arena the Vern Miller Memorial Arena in his honour.

== Geography ==
=== Climate ===
Iroquois Falls falls within the northern periphery of the humid continental climate (Dfb) despite extreme January and February record lows that exceed that of many subarctic regions. In January 1935, the town set the record low temperature for Ontario of −58.3 °C (−73 °F), the town also happens to hold the unofficial February record low of −55.6 °C (−68 °F). set in February 1899 (before the town was officially incorporated but weather was taken) and tied in February 1934 but it wasn't recorded at the location used for official temperature readings. Winter typically lasts from the end of October to well into April.

Climate data for Iroquois Falls
Month	Jan	Feb	Mar	Apr	May	Jun	Jul	Aug	Sep	Oct	Nov	Dec	Year
Record high °C (°F)	8.3 (46.9)	10.0 (50.0)	21.7 (71.1)	31.7 (89.1)	35.0 (95.0)	38.0 (100.4)	41.1 (106.0)	37.2 (99.0)	33.3 (91.9)	28.9 (84.0)	19.4 (66.9)	14.5 (58.1)	41.1 (106.0)
Mean daily maximum °C (°F)	−11.0 (12.2)	−8.2 (17.2)	−1.3 (29.7)	7.6 (45.7)	16.1 (61.0)	21.8 (71.2)	24.1 (75.4)	22.4 (72.3)	15.8 (60.4)	8.6 (47.5)	0.1 (32.2)	−7.8 (18.0)	7.4 (45.3)
Daily mean °C (°F)	−17.9 (−0.2)	−15.6 (3.9)	−8.6 (16.5)	0.9 (33.6)	9.1 (48.4)	14.5 (58.1)	17.2 (63.0)	15.8 (60.4)	10.0 (50.0)	3.9 (39.0)	−4.2 (24.4)	−13.8 (7.2)	0.9 (33.6)
Mean daily minimum °C (°F)	−24.7 (−12.5)	−23.0 (−9.4)	−15.9 (3.4)	−5.9 (21.4)	2.0 (35.6)	7.3 (45.1)	10.2 (50.4)	9.1 (48.4)	4.2 (39.6)	−0.8 (30.6)	−8.6 (16.5)	−19.8 (−3.6)	−5.5 (22.1)
Record low °C (°F)	−58.3 (−72.9)	−45.6 (−50.1)	−42.2 (−44.0)	−30.0 (−22.0)	−13.3 (8.1)	−9.4 (15.1)	−3.0 (26.6)	−3.3 (26.1)	−8.3 (17.1)	−16.1 (3.0)	−32.8 (−27.0)	−46.1 (−51.0)	−58.3 (−72.9)
Average precipitation mm (inches)	49.4 (1.94)	30.6 (1.20)	49.7 (1.96)	45.1 (1.78)	60.9 (2.40)	81.5 (3.21)	93.3 (3.67)	85.9 (3.38)	96.6 (3.80)	68.5 (2.70)	57.2 (2.25)	57.4 (2.26)	776.0 (30.55)
Average rainfall mm (inches)	2.7 (0.11)	2.9 (0.11)	16.2 (0.64)	31.0 (1.22)	58.0 (2.28)	81.4 (3.20)	93.3 (3.67)	85.9 (3.38)	96.2 (3.79)	62.9 (2.48)	25.2 (0.99)	5.6 (0.22)	561.2 (22.09)
Average snowfall cm (inches)	46.7 (18.4)	27.6 (10.9)	33.5 (13.2)	14.1 (5.6)	2.9 (1.1)	0.1 (0.0)	0.0 (0.0)	0.0 (0.0)	0.4 (0.2)	5.6 (2.2)	32.0 (12.6)	51.8 (20.4)	214.8 (84.6)
Average precipitation days (≥ 0.2 mm)	12.0	9.1	9.3	9.0	11.7	14.2	14.4	13.7	16.3	15.0	13.7	14.4	152.6
Average rainy days (≥ 0.2 mm)	0.18	0.61	2.0	6.1	11.3	14.2	14.4	13.7	16.2	13.3	5.0	0.93	97.9
Average snowy days (≥ 0.2 cm)	11.9	8.6	7.7	3.3	0.67	0.04	0.04	0.0	0.11	2.6	9.6	13.6	58.2
Source: Environment Canada

== Demographics ==
In the 2021 Census of Population conducted by Statistics Canada, Iroquois Falls had a population of 4,418 living in 1,977 of its 2,153 total private dwellings, a change of −2.6% from its 2016 population of 4,537. With a land area of 599.03 km^{2} (231.29 sq mi), it had a population density of 7.4/km^{2} (19.1/sq mi) in 2021.

Canada census – Iroquois Falls community profile

	2021	2016	2011
Population	4,418 (-2.6% from 2016)	4,537 (-1.3% from 2011)	4,595 (-2.8% from 2006)
Land area	599.03 km^{2} (231.29 sq mi)	600.01 km^{2} (231.67 sq mi)	599.92 km^{2} (231.63 sq mi)
Population density	7.4/km^{2} (19/sq mi)	7.6/km^{2} (20/sq mi)	7.7/km^{2} (20/sq mi)
Median age	48.0 (M: 45.2, F: 49.6)	49.6 (M: 48.5, F: 51.0)
Private dwellings	2,153 (total) 1,977 (occupied)	2,245 (total)	2,192 (total)
Median household income	$75,000	$64,400

References: 2021 2016 2011

Historical census populations – Iroquois Falls

Year	Pop.	±%
1921	1,178	—
1931	1,476	+25.3%
1941	1,302	−11.8%
1951	1,342	+3.1%
1956	1,478	+10.1%
1961	1,681	+13.7%

Year	Pop.	±%
1966	1,834	+9.1%
1971	7,271	+296.5%
1976	6,887	−5.3%
1981	6,339	−8.0%
1986	6,191	−2.3%
1991	5,999	−3.1%

Year	Pop.	±%
1996	5,714	−4.8%
2001	5,217	−8.7%
2006	4,729	−9.4%
2011	4,595	−2.8%
2016	4,537	−1.3%
2021	4,418	−2.6%

Population counts are not adjusted for boundary changes and mergers.
Source: Statistics Canada

== Economy ==
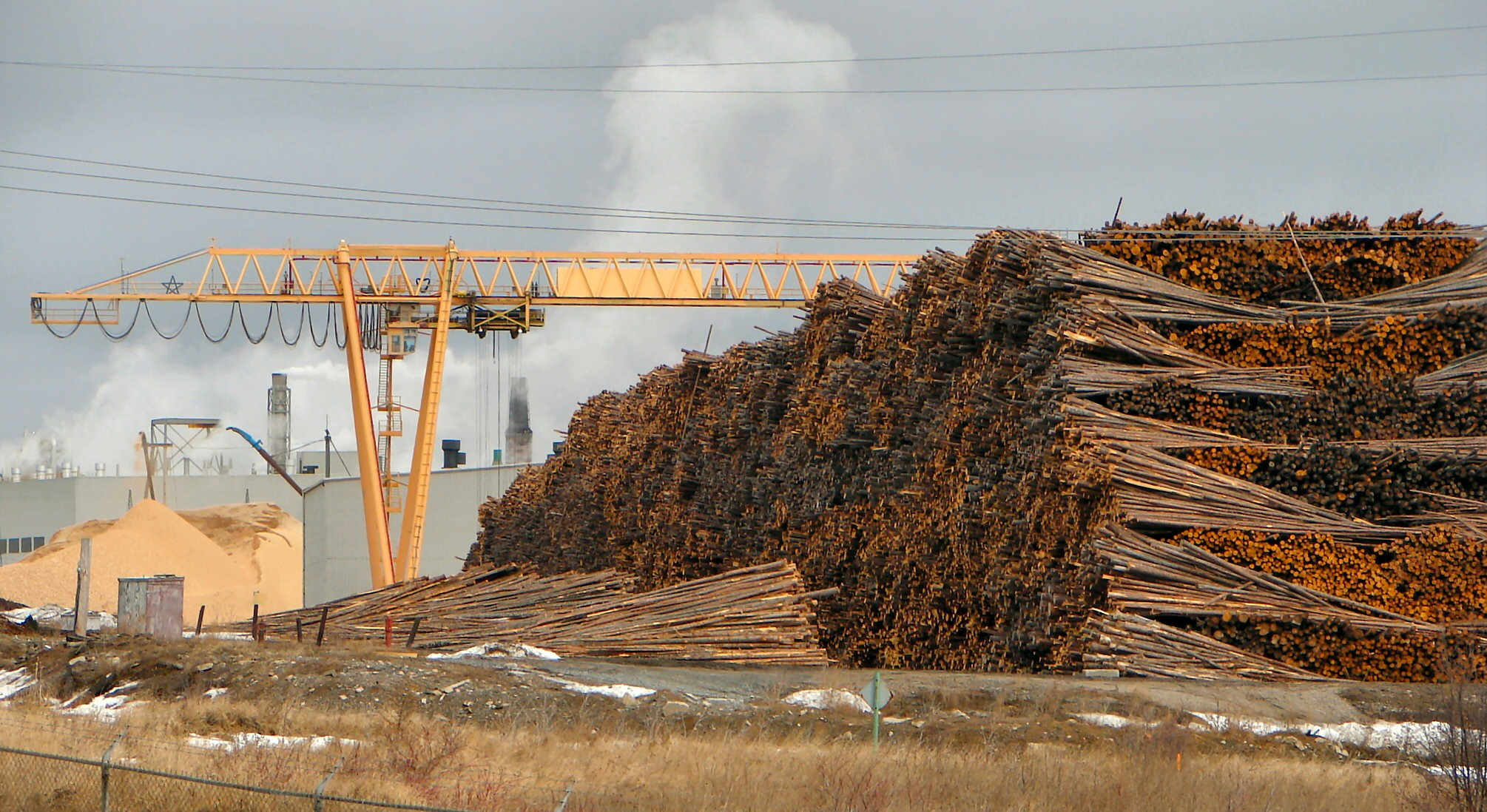
Former Resolute Forest Products mill in Iroquois Falls

Resolute Forest Products announced the permanent closure of its mill in Iroquois Falls on 5 December 2014, eliminating 180 jobs. Mayor Michael Shea commented: "it's going to affect every village in Northern Ontario."

In 2015, the Town of Iroquois Falls entered into an agreement with Resolute Forest Products, and Riverside Developments, regarding redeveloping the former mill site into a multi-use industrial facility, commercial-industrial park, or possibly a greenhouse complex.

== Sports and recreation ==
=== Jus Jordan Arena ===
The Jus Jordan Arena arena and curling rinks were completed in 1955. The arena was designed and construction supervised by then Abitibi Paper Company engineer Jus Jordan. entirely through the volunteer effort of townspeople.

There is a Hockey rink with a full surrounding of seats, a Curling rink with five playing surfaces, a cafeteria and a licensed lounge. A pool was added in 1979, and the complex was renovated in 2007.

The Iroquois Falls Curling Club is located at the arena.

The arena is currently home to the Iroquois Falls Storm and was formerly home to the Abitibi Eskimos, Iroquois Falls Jr. Eskis and Iroquois Falls Eskis of the Northern Ontario Junior Hockey League.

=== Annual events ===
Each summer brings the "Search for Moby Pike" fishing derby on Lake Abitibi.

'MusicMusicMusic' was an annual live event on the second weekend of August, and featured local musicians raising funds for community charities.

The Porquis Blues Festival, later renamed the Porquis Music Festival, was an annual festival in Porquis Junction, a small community south-west of Iroquois Falls. The last festival was in 2022.

== Education ==
Iroquois Falls is served by:

- District School Board Ontario North East
- Conseil scolaire de district du Nord-Est de l'Ontario
- Conseil scolaire catholique de district des Grandes-Rivières

== Notable people ==
- Henry Abramson, dean at Lander College of Arts and Science, Touro College, New York.
- Frank Bergeron, professional hockey player.
- Aubrey Cosens, recipient of the Victoria Cross.
- Paul Gagné, professional hockey player.
- Ryan Garlock, professional hockey player.
- Roger Lemelin, professional hockey player.
- Patricia O'Callaghan, soprano opera singer
- Yvan Patry, Québécois documentary filmmaker.
- Gerry Rioux, professional hockey player.
- Caitlin Romain, professional curler.

== In popular culture ==
Canadian musician Stompin' Tom Connors sang "May, the Millwright's Daughter" on his 1967 album The Northlands' Own Tom Connors:

In a little town called Ansonville,
not very far from the papermill.
There lives a girl I'm thinkin' of,
May, the millwright's daughter, the girl I really love.

== See also ==
- List of francophone communities in Ontario
- Iroquois Falls Airport
