= John Bridcut =

English documentary filmmaker

John Bridcut MVO is an English documentary filmmaker. Bridcut was born on 13 June 1952, and was educated at Radley College and Keble College, Oxford, obtaining a MA in literae humaniores (classics) in 1975. He is an honorary fellow of Keble College.

== Career ==
In 1975 he joined the BBC as a news trainee, and worked on news and current affairs programmes for twelve years. Since then he has been an independent producer, mainly working through his own company, Crux Productions.

Bridcut is best known for his films about British composers. One of his most famous works, Britten's Children (2004), is a study of the influence that Benjamin Britten's close relationships with children had on the composer and material from the documentary was later made into a book (2006). A further film about the way Britten's battle with his health affected his late music came at the time of the composer's centenary (Britten's Endgame, 2013).

He has also created documentaries about Dame Janet Baker (Janet Baker In Her Own Words, 2018), Ralph Vaughan Williams (The Passions of Vaughan Williams, 2008), Edward Elgar (The Man Behind the Mask, 2010) and Hubert Parry (The Prince and the Composer, 2011), the latter a collaboration with Charles, Prince of Wales, whom he had earlier profiled in Charles at 60: The Passionate Prince. In November 2018, after being given 12 months exclusive access to Charles, Prince of Wales, Bridcut's film Prince, Son and Heir: Charles at 70 was first aired by the BBC. Other documentaries by Bridcut include studies of Queen Elizabeth II, Michael Tippett, Bernard Haitink, Colin Davis, Mstislav Rostropovich, Herbert von Karajan, Jonas Kaufmann, Rudolf Nureyev, Roald Dahl and Hillary Clinton. He also produced a three-part series about the first 50 years of the BBC (How the BBC Began, 2022-4), and a performance of Schubert's Winterreise song cycle at the top of a snowy mountain pass in Switzerland (Winter Journey, 2022).

In 2012, Bridcut was made a Member of the Royal Victorian Order.
