= Lyle Chan =

Australian composer

Lyle Chan is an Australian composer, known for his unique approach of writing cumulative works with only one work per genre. His AIDS Memoir Quartet chronicles his years as an HIV/AIDS activist at the height of the epidemic in Australia. John Cage was a major influence on his work, and he is regarded as an authority on the musician.

== Early life and education ==
Lyle Chan received a Bachelor of Physics from the University of Wisconsin, Madison. He studied music with Conrad Pope, J. Peter Burkholder and the Pro Arte String Quartet. He was Artists & Repertoire Manager for the Australian record label ABC Classics for over ten years.

== Musical influences ==
Chan has acknowledged John Cage and Morton Feldman among his primary musical influences and is himself acknowledged as an authority on Cage. For the composer's centenary in 2012 he was invited by the John Cage Trust and the Sydney Opera House to deliver a lecture in that landmark building on Cage's seminal "silent" piece 4′33″. Timed to last 43 minutes and 30 seconds, the lecture was called "probing" by Limelight magazine. "It took four years for Cage to write the piece, to master the courage and rationale behind it", he said.

== Works ==
Chan has described his music as a diary or memoir, particularly of emotions, and writes cumulative works with only one work per genre. These cumulative compositions have highly abstract titles such as Orchestra with Solo Instruments and Solo Piano, but each is made up of self-contained sections with more descriptive titles. His most autobiographical works are Solo Piano and String Quartet.

He has called it "a perpetual work in progress", saying "as an artist, you create one work, which is the work defined by the life that you lead and the experiences that you have". "The music were my diaries, a way of writing down feelings. As a composer I think of music as the sound that feelings make."

Four such sections have received high-profile media coverage: Wind Farm Music (Dedicated to Tony Abbott), Rendezvous With Destiny, AIDS Memoir Quartet and Serenade for Tenor, Saxophone and Orchestra.

=== Solo Piano ===
Very few sections of Solo Piano have been publicly released, the major exception being Forever #1, a one-minute piece written for the second anniversary of the 9/11 terrorist attacks in the USA. It is purposely similar to the one minute of silence observed at commemoration ceremonies.

His website contains memoir essays on several other sections of Solo Piano, such as Untitled (for Steve), Wisconsin Cowboy Lullaby and Nachtstück, none of which he has allowed to be publicly performed so far.

=== String Quartet ===
Several sections of String Quartet have been publicly released, notably the sections covering the years 1991 to 1996, known as the AIDS Memoir Quartet. Other sections include Liberty and the Pursuit, a tribute to his teachers the Pro Arte Quartet, and Farwell My Good I Forever, and Untitled (Thomas Brand gewidmet).

=== AIDS Memoir Quartet ===
AIDS Memoir Quartet chronicles Chan's six years as an AIDS activist at the height of the epidemic in Australia, including importing experimental medications from Los Angeles to Sydney. The work has been exclusively performed by the Acacia Quartet.

=== Voices and Instruments ===
Voices and Instruments is a diverse work employing any combination of voices (solo or choral) and instruments (chamber, orchestral or electronic). Though less obviously autobiographical than String Quartet or Solo Piano, it does contain sections inspired by events within his direct experience, such as the Lindt Cafe hostage crisis of 2014, or discovering that Benjamin Britten's first love Wulff Scherchen was alive and living in Australia.

Several sections have been released: "Wachsein ist andersvo (Awakening is elsewhere)", Rendezvous With Destiny, "Dass ich dich schau ewiglich" (That I may see you eternally),, Love Is Always Born (December) and Serenade for Tenor, Saxophone and Orchestra ("My Dear Benjamin").

=== Serenade for Tenor, Saxophone and Orchestra ("My Dear Benjamin") ===
This orchestral song cycle is based on letters between Benjamin Britten and Wulff Scherchen.

Chan decided to write the work when he discovered that Scherchen was still alive and went to meet the 95-year-old who was living in northern New South Wales, Australia.

It was awarded the Orchestral Work of the Year prize at the 2017 Art Music Awards.

== Recognition ==
In particular the AIDS Memoir Quartet has been recognised for its significance both as a work of art and as a historical document. Limelight magazine described it as "A crushingly powerful work of musical history... A towering piece". Award-winning American composer John Corigliano wrote that it is "a very ambitious work born out of a seemingly endless plague. Its composer has taken his experiences of living through the enormous tragedy of AIDS and from them has molded a serious and deeply felt work of art."

Since 2013, Chan's personal website has been selected for ongoing preservation by the National Library of Australia on its PANDORA archive, recognising his contribution to culture and history.

Chan's works have been programmed by the major arts organisations in Australia such as the Sydney Philharmonia Choir, the Song Company, Queensland Symphony Orchestra, Tasmanian Symphony Orchestra, Camerata of St John's, Brisbane Festival, National Gallery of Victoria, Art Gallery of NSW, Sydney Opera House, Australian Broadcasting Corporation, and others.

Chan is especially highly regarded for his chamber music, which has been performed by pianists Simon Tedeschi and Benjamin Martin, and groups such as Australia Piano Quartet, Australian Art Quartet, Seraphim Trio, New Sydney Wind Quintet, and Acacia Quartet.
