= Burke Reid =

Australian record producer

Burke Reid is an Australian record producer and musician.

== Career ==
After migrating from Canada to Australia in 1994 at the age of 14 years, Reid became one third of the band Gerling in 1997. Following the announcement of a hiatus by Gerling in 2007, Reid continued in the music industry as a record producer.

The first album that Reid produced was The Mess Hall's Devils Elbow which won the Australian Music Prize (AMP) in 2007. He was subsequently involved with numerous AMP-nominated albums, such as The Drones' Havilah, Dan Kelly Dan Kelly's Dream, Jack Ladder Love is Gone and Courtney Barnett Sometimes I Sit and Think, and Sometimes I Just Sit.

== Discography ==
Producer, engineer and/or mixer for the following artists:

- Bad Dreems – Doomsday Ballet (2019)
- The Bungalows – Monkey Mountain Road (2011)
- Canyons – Keep Your Dreams (2011)
- The Chemist – Ballet In The Badlands (2013)
- City Calm Down – Television (2019)
- Courtney Barnett – Sometimes I Sit and Think, and Sometimes I Just Sit (2015)
- Courtney Barnett – Tell Me How You Really Feel (2018)
- Curse of Company – Leo Magnets Joins A Gang (2009)
- Dan Kelly – Dan Kelly's Dream (2010)
- Donny Benet – The Don (2018)
- Donny Benet – Mr. Experience (2020)
- The Drones – Havilah (2008)
- The Drones – I See Seaweed (2013)
- DZ Deathrays – Black Rat (2014)
- DZ Deathrays – Blood On My Leather (2016)
- DZ Deathrays – Bloody Lovely (2018)
- Eskimo Joe – Wastelands (2013)
- Flyte – Please Eloise (2015)
- Flyte – The Loved Ones (2017)
- Flyte – White Roses (2019)
- Gareth Liddiard – Strange Tourist (2011)
- Ghoul – Dunks (2011)
- Ghosts Of Television – Furthest Village From The Sun (2008)
- Green Buzzard – Eazy, Queezy, Squeezy (2016)
- Green Buzzard – Space Man Rodeo (2017)
- Holly Throsby – Team (2011)
- Jack Ladder – Love Is Gone (2009)
- Jack Ladder and The Dreamlanders – Hurtsville (2011)
- Julia Jacklin – Crushing (2019)
- July Talk – Pray for It (2020)
- The Kill Devil Hills – Man You Should Explode (2009)
- Liam Finn – FOMO (2011)
- Loene Carmen – It Walks Like Love (2009)
- The Mess Hall – Devils Elbow (2007)
- The Mess Hall – For the Birds (2009)
- Mike Noga – The Balladeer Hunter (2011)
- Mossy – Waterfall (2016)
- Olympia – Self Talk (2016)
- Olympia – Flamingo (2019)
- Oh Mercy – Deep Heat (2012)
- Papa VS Pretty – Self titled EP (2007)
- Peter Garrett – A Version of Now (2016)
- PVT – Church With No Magic (2010)
- The Preatures – Girlhood (2017)
- Rolling Blackouts Coastal Fever – Sideways To New Italy (2020)
- Ryan Downey – A Ton of Colours (2021)
- Seekae – +DOME (2011)
- Sarah Blasko – Eternal Return (2015)
- Sports Team – Deep Down Happy (2020)
- Tucker B's – Nightmares in the Key of (((((WOW))))) (2009)
- Twin Beasts – Bad Love (2014)
- Warhorse – Guns (2007)
- Willis Drummond – A Ala B (2012)
- Willis Drummond – Tabula rasa (2016)
- Wolf & Cub – Heavy Weight (2013)
- Wolf & Cub – One To The Other (2010)
- Wolf & Cub – See The Light & All Through The Night (2012)
- Young Empires – White Doves & We Don't Sleep Tonight (2012)

Musician and co-producer for the following albums as a member of Gerling:

- Gerling – 4
- Gerling – Bad Blood!!!
- Gerling – When Young Terrorists Chase the Sun
- Gerling – Children of Telepathic Experiences
