= Darren Cross (musician) =

Australian songwriter, musician

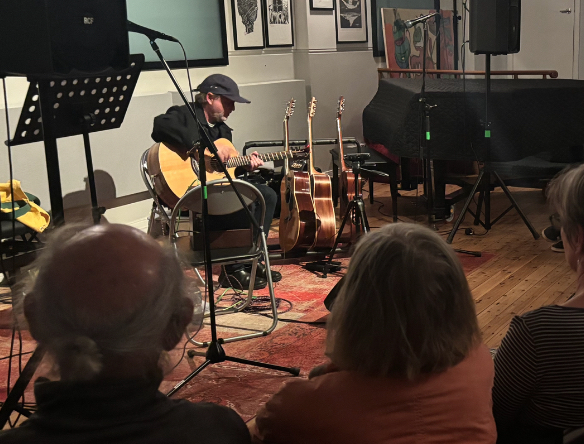
- Cross, Live at the Red House, October 2025.

Background information
- Also known as: Darren E Spielberg-Cross; Darren James Cross; the E.L.F.; D.C Cross
- Born: Sydney, New South Wales, Australia
- Genres: Electronic; alternative rock; pop; folk noir
- Occupations: Musician; songwriter, record producer; music video maker
- Instruments: Vocals; guitar
- Years active: 1992–present
- Labels: No Drums; Flying Nun; Festival; Trifekta; Sony; Fellaheen
- Website: darrencross.bandcamp.com

Darren James Cross, previously known as Darren E. Spielberg-Cross, is an Australian songwriter, musician, guitarist, record producer and video maker. Cross is the founding mainstay lead vocalist and guitarist of alternative rock group Gerling (1992–2007). He started the E.L.F. project in 2007, which issued an album, Plankton Icke and Tina Turner David City Limits (2010). His folk noir duo Jep and Dep were formed in 2012 with his domestic partner, Jessica Cassar on co-lead vocals, which have issued two albums. Under his own name he has released five studio albums, _Xantastic (2016), Peacer (2018), Keeping Up? (2020) and Distorder (2021). The artist's instrumental folk guitar project, D.C Cross has released seven albums, Ecstatic Racquet (2019), Terabithian (2020), Hot-wire the Lay-low (Australian escapist pieces for guitar) (2022), Wizrad (2023),Glookies Guit (2024), D.C Cross - Live at the Red House (2025)Open Guitar - Volume One (2025) and Open Guitar - Volume Two (2026). In October 2026, Cross released his debut duo album with Andrew Tuttle called AT/DC on the Someone Good / ROOM40 label.

Cross has collaborated with other artists, the Apartments, Kylie Minogue, the Avalanches, Jagwar Ma and Kool Keith. The musician has worked in diverse genres from commercial house music, indie rock-style detuned guitar pop, abstract electronica with Gerling to Americana-style traditional folk music. Cross has a music and video production studio, Bernstein studios and performs live in Jep and Dep and as Darren Cross or D.C Cross.

== Career ==
=== Gerling (1991–2007) ===
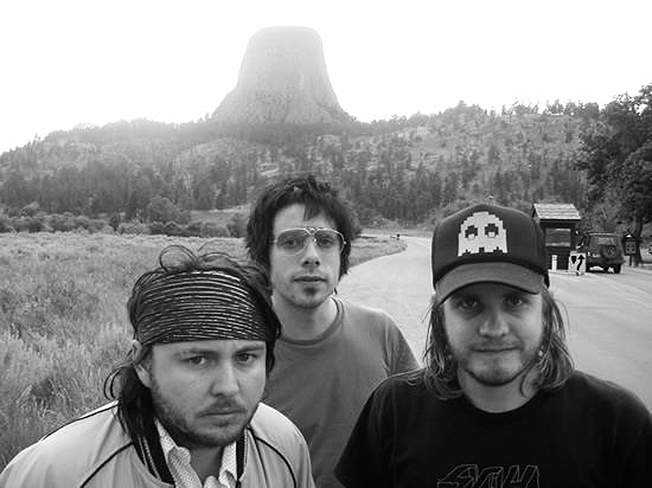
Gerling on tour in United States at Devils Tower Wyoming, 2002. Darren Cross at left.

Darren James Cross, as Darren E. Spielberg-Cross, on lead vocals, guitar and synthesiser founded the Australian alternative rock group, Gerling, in 1993. He had attended secondary school in the western suburbs of Sydney, at the height of grunge. Other founders were Presser (a.k.a. Paul Towner) on drums and Brad Herdson on guitar and vocals. Gerling's early music was influenced by Pavement, Sonic Youth, Boredoms, Beck and Mercury Rev; writing with two guitars and drums. The group provided experimental guitar pop, on their debut single, "Sedatives for Dead Radars" (1995) via Steve Pavlovic's Fellaheen Records label.

They followed with an extended play, A Day of Research (1996). Their repertoire moved towards dance music and sampling. Gerling released four studio albums, Children of Telepathic Experiences (February 1998), When Young Terrorists Chase the Sun (September 2001), Bad Blood!!! (2003) and 4 (March 2006). The band toured Australia extensively, and also toured the United Kingdom gaining positive reviews in NME, Japan and New Zealand. In 1999 Cross, Tim Everist and Rhys Lee formed Schwipe, a T-shirt label.

Guest vocalists on When Young Terrorists Chase the Sun were Kylie Minogue on "G-House Prokect", Kool Keith on "Brother Keith on Destructor Mountain (4001)", Solex on "Windmills and Birdbaths" and Inga Liljeström on "Dust Me Selecta". Bad Blood!! was more in the dance and electronica genres due to use of sampled programmed drums, vocoders and computer plugins and distortion. Gerling went into hiatus by 2008. According to Cross, he wrote lyrics for 26 out-of 57 Gerling songs. Cross and Presser, created the group's album artworks and collages, as the Deli Bros/Deli Brothers.

=== The E.L.F. (2007–2012) ===
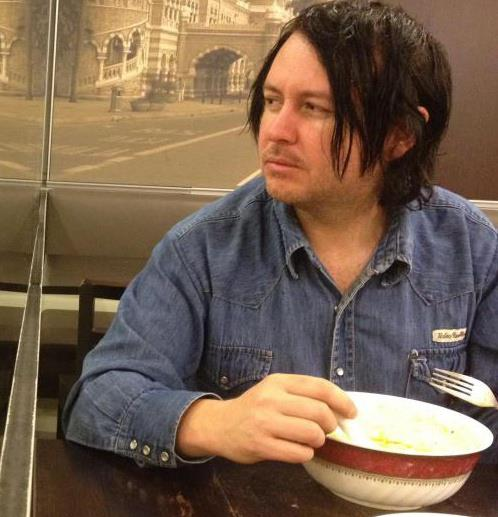
Cross as the E.L.F., April 2012

After Gerling announced an indefinite hiatus in 2007, Cross began working as the E.L.F., providing dance and electronica material. The E.L.F.'s debut extended play, Stevie Nicks Hearts (2008), was recorded at his home studio in Sydney. It was issued on his own label, Oak Records. He released a second EP, Sunray in the Rave Cave (2008) and an album Plankton Icke and Tina Turner David City Limits (late 2010). The album received 9.2 out-of 10 from Jonny of Polaroids of Androids. Cross performed, produced and wrote all material himself; he also toured and DJed throughout Australia. His track "Cockroaches" was played on Triple J and its music video had nearly 250000 hits.

In March 2010 Cross on lead guitar and vocals formed the pop rock trio, Betty Airs in Sydney with Christian Campano on lead vocals, maracas and tambourine, and Michael Zagoridis on drums. They issued a single, "Reverse Now", via Cross' label Oak Records. Cross also produced the work at his E.L.F. Porta-Studios in July of that year. Triple J's reviewer, Richard Kingsmill rated "Reverse Now" at four-out-of-five and exalted, "Nice one Darren - still fighting the good fight. I like the mix of influences coming through in this." Drew Larringfort of Rave Review caught their performance at Adelaide's Ed Castle, "[their] chemistry was incredible, feeding off each other with comical stage banter, joking with the 'hipsters' in the crowd and having a good old fashioned fun time." By 2011 they had expanded to a four-piece with Patrick Matthews on bass guitar. Cross quit and the group broke up. This line-up issued an EP, Creepin' It Real, by April of that year.

=== Jep and Dep (2012–present) ===
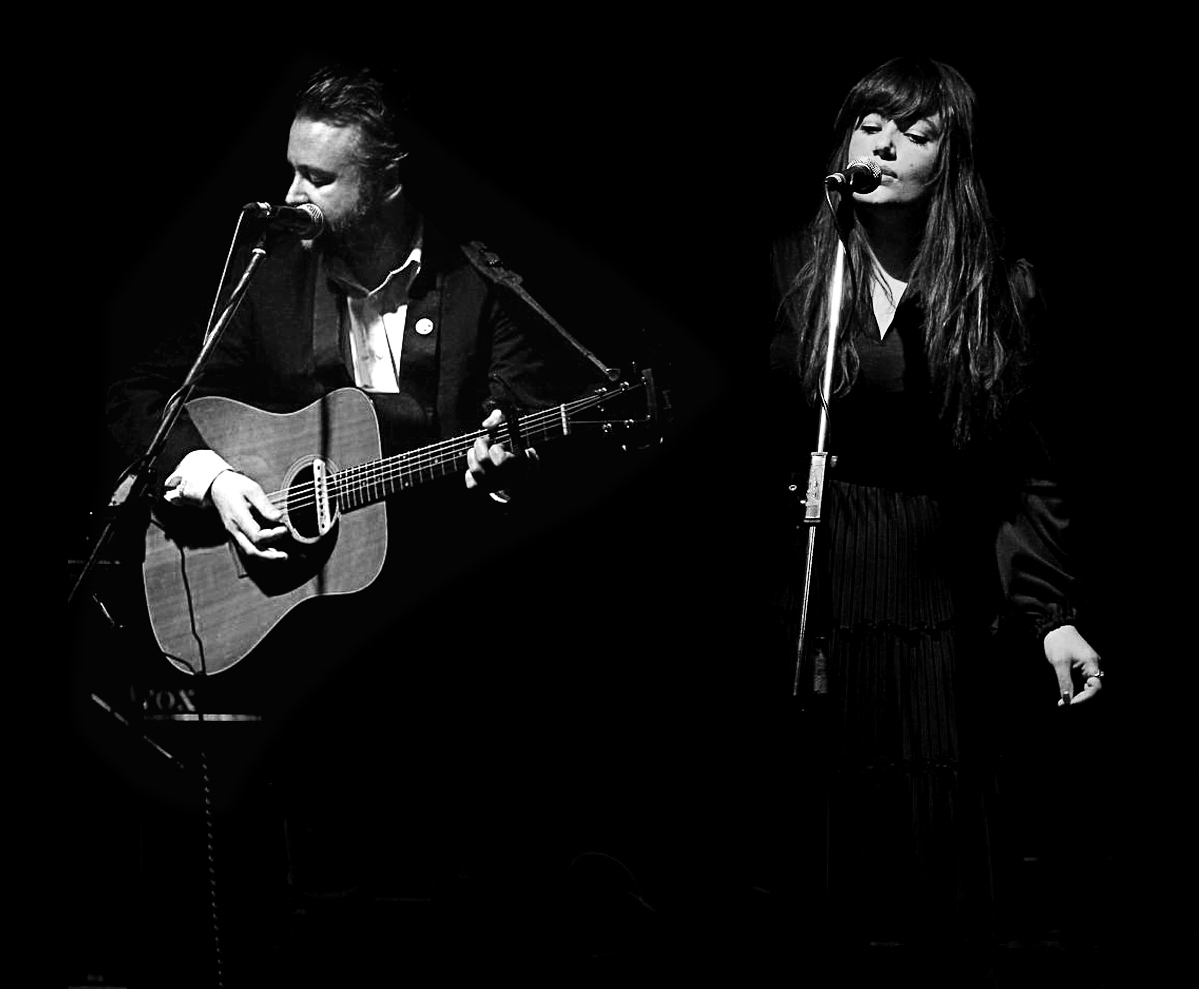
Cross at left with Jessica Cassar, performing as Jep and Dep, January 2014

In 2012 Cross started a folk-noir duo with his domestic partner, Jessica Cassar on co-lead vocals, Jep and Dep. They are often compared to Lee Hazlewood / Nancy Sinatra and Nick Cave and Kylie Minogue on Murder Ballads, with The Sydney Morning Herald's Jeff Apter stating, "ballads with the right balance of creeping menace and painful regret." In late 2014 the duo independently released their debut album, Word Got Out, which received 4 out-of 5 stars in reviews at Rolling Stone Australia, and The Sydney Morning Herald. The duo adopt a film noir-aesthetic for their music videos, photographs and artwork and perform live with Cross on acoustic guitar and both on vocals. They supported Johnny Marr (the Smiths), Jessica Pratt, Mirel Wagner, Courtney Barnett, Kristin Hersh from Throwing Muses, Gruff Rhys from Super Furry Animals and Blackeyed Susans. Cross produced Word Got Out at his Bernstein Studios.

=== Solo work (2012–present) ===
Cross, under his own name, released two independent folk, Americana EPs, Freak Out Inn III (April 2013) and No Damage (2014). He wrote, performed, produced the recordings; he also made the related artwork and most of the music videos himself. Cross co-wrote "That Loneliness" on Jagwar Ma's debut album Howlin' (2013) with the band's Jonathan Ma and Gabriel Navidzadeh (a.k.a. Gabriel Winterfield). He issued a single, "And the New York Rain Came Down" in December 2014.

Cross described his debut album, _Xantastic (9 September 2016) (pronounced: ZAN-tas-tic) as "probably the closest thing I have done that would be a come close to a Gerling album… " Cross wrote, recorded, produced all of the music at his Bernstein Studios, Sydney. It was released via his own independent record label, No Drums Records for the Australian market. The label Rockers Die Younger issued it on vinyl in France in January 2017.

Apter determined it is "an intriguing album... [with a] dark and stark mood." Rhythmns magazine's Chris Familton said "melancholy, plaintiff and downbeat in the vein of Nick Drake, Beck, Neil Young and Bill Callahan – yet he has found clever and unobtrusive ways to incorporate samples, synths, drum machines and effects that add a dystopian, sci-fi quality to the music". Rolling Stone Australia's Jonny Nail reviewed its track, "Highway Lights in the Night" and felt it is a "nostalgic synth-folk tilt, with his lonesome vocals, unmistakably his own."

Cross released his second solo album, Peacer, via No Drum in August 2018. Described as the bastian of a modern polymathic D.I.Y artist: writing, recording, performing and producing the album himself at his Bernstein Studios. Special guests on the album include R. Stevie Moore and Cassar from Jep and Dep. 4ZZZ radio's Jade Rodrigo described it as, "a crazy mix of dream pop, retro pop, indie-folk and avant pop, but somehow it cohesively comes together to deliver a cracker of an album." The album jumps between anarchic gospel-krautrock-indie guitar pop tunes to neo-folk fingerpicking spaced out meltdowns.

Keeping Up? (2020) is the first purely electronic album for Cross since 2008. He used an obsolete drum machine, computer and operating system. Tyler Jenke from Rolling Stone Australia gave the album 4.5 stars out of 5 and explained, "blissful ocean of nostalgia, with hazy instrumentation, vocoded vocals, and echoed drumbeats and electronic blips immersing the listener in a devastatingly unique, yet warmly familiar world of musical euphoria." Doubtful Sounds' Chris Familton observed, "There's an overwhelmingly immersive quality to the music. Drug-like, womb-like - that intrinsic memory of holding your breath underwater as a child and feeling at peace in the aquatic cocoon."

With comparisons to Gerling, Cross released his fourth studio album, Distorder, on 19 July 2021 on bandcamp exclusively. Jenke stated "[it's] one which feels like a true breath of fresh air – an escapist's paradise made, fittingly, within Cross’ own studio utopia." Backseat Mafia's Arun Kendall gave the album 8.7/10, "[it] is a brilliant expression of our times: discordant, unsettling and at times bleak, but delivered with a swagger and a panache. Cross puts on display his musicianship and creativity, creating something dark and elusive yet touched with a certain element of wry amusement. A panoply of sonic expression, a bitter confection of dissonance but a thoroughly enjoyable and cathartic whole."

=== D.C Cross: (2019–present) ===
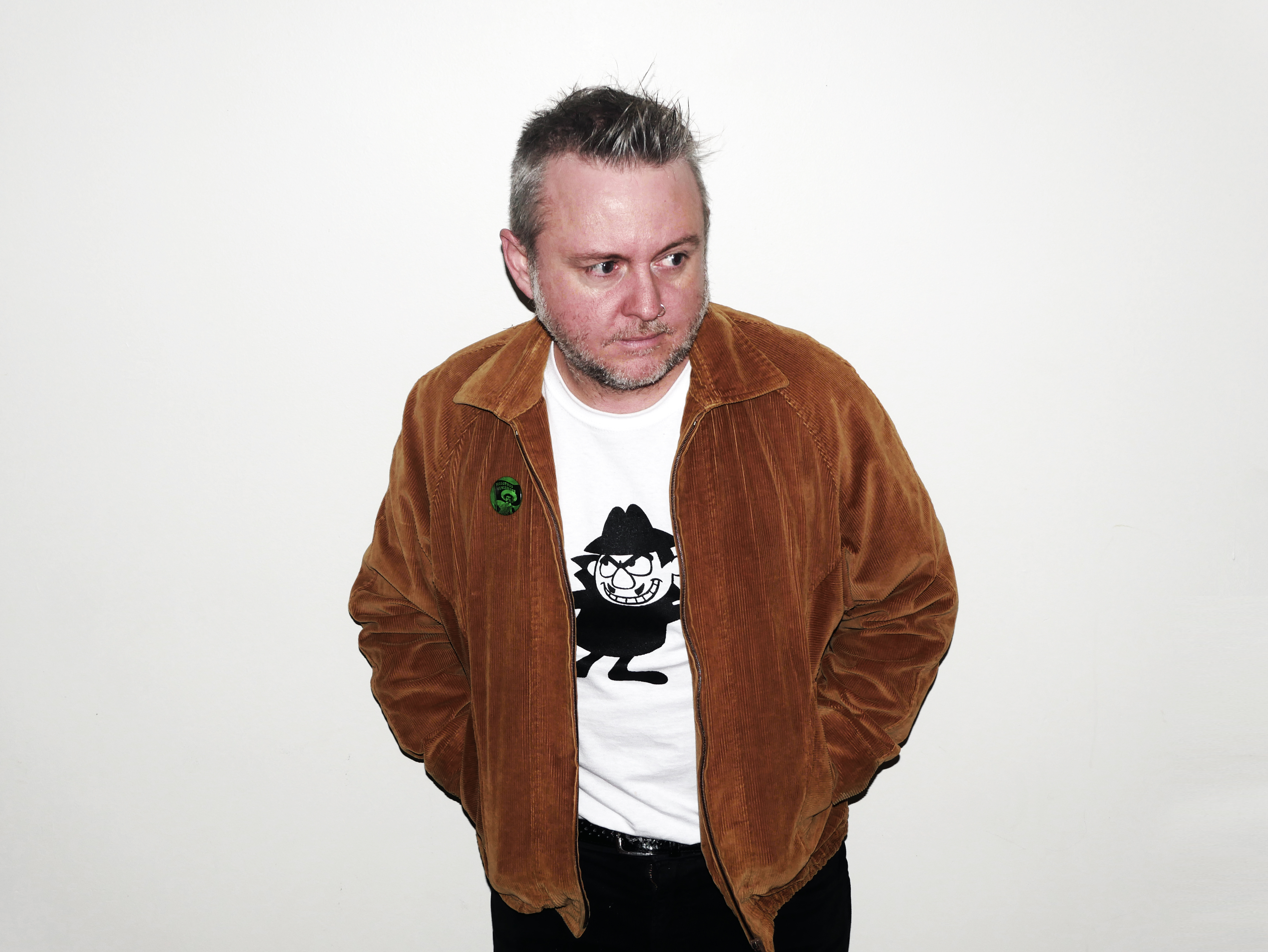
Cross, July 2021

=== Ecstatic Racquet (2019) ===
Cross began a project as D.C Cross in 2019, by playing steel-string acoustic guitar using an American primitive guitar-style with an Australian feel and sound. His influences include British folk revivalists Bert Jansch, John Fahey, Leo Kottke as well as newer artists, Ryley Walker and Steve Gunn. His first instrumental folk acoustic guitar album as D.C Cross is Ecstatic Racquet. Rhythms magazine said "Finding beauty in small details, despair in others. It's a special thing to be able to create these wordless stories with such lyrical qualities, and in the context of contemporary Australian music this stands as a rare and quite unique album".

=== Terabithian (2020) ===
During the COVID-19 pandemic, D.C Cross issued his second album, Terabithian (20 April 2020). "Equally parts ambient and instrumental folk guitar influenced by American primitive guitarists, British folk revivalists and 90's new-age ambient music." Tone Deaf's Tyler Jenke observed, "To put it simply though, if you're a fan of instrumental music, Terabithian is ... a record you must experience ... with [i] serving as one of the most mesmerising instrumental releases you'll hear for some time. D.C Cross' Terabithian is a high watermark of instrumental music."

=== Stolen Police Vehicle Down the Great Western Highway (2021) ===
"Stolen Police Vehicle Down the Great Western Highway" was released on 28 April 2021, by D.C Cross. It is an antipodean instrumental guitar track, which was premiered on Radio National's Breakfast. It was the first live music performance on the Australian Broadcasting Corporation (ABC) network in over a year, since the first wave of COVID-19 appeared in Australia.

=== Hot-wire the Lay-low (Australian escapist pieces for guitar) (2022) ===
Cross released his third D.C Cross album Hot-wire the Lay-low (Australian escapist pieces for guitar) (5 February 2022). Once again an instrumental Australian Primitive Guitar album, Folk Radio Uk said "an ace display of solo instrumental guitar music from a player with plenty to say and all the skills to say it..." The album was written mostly in the Central Tablelands in N.S.W, Backseat Mafia wrote "Cross has released a quiet and evocative album of instrumentals, putting on show his refined and delicate abilities on guitar and ability to capture exquisite senses and feelings of the Australian countryside." The record was mastered by Patrick Klem. On writing the album, Cross stated "Hearing Sonic Youth open tunings (Daydream Nation, Goo, Dirty) when I was a kid also was a gateway to John Fahey and Nick Drake solo guitar... it all made sense'.

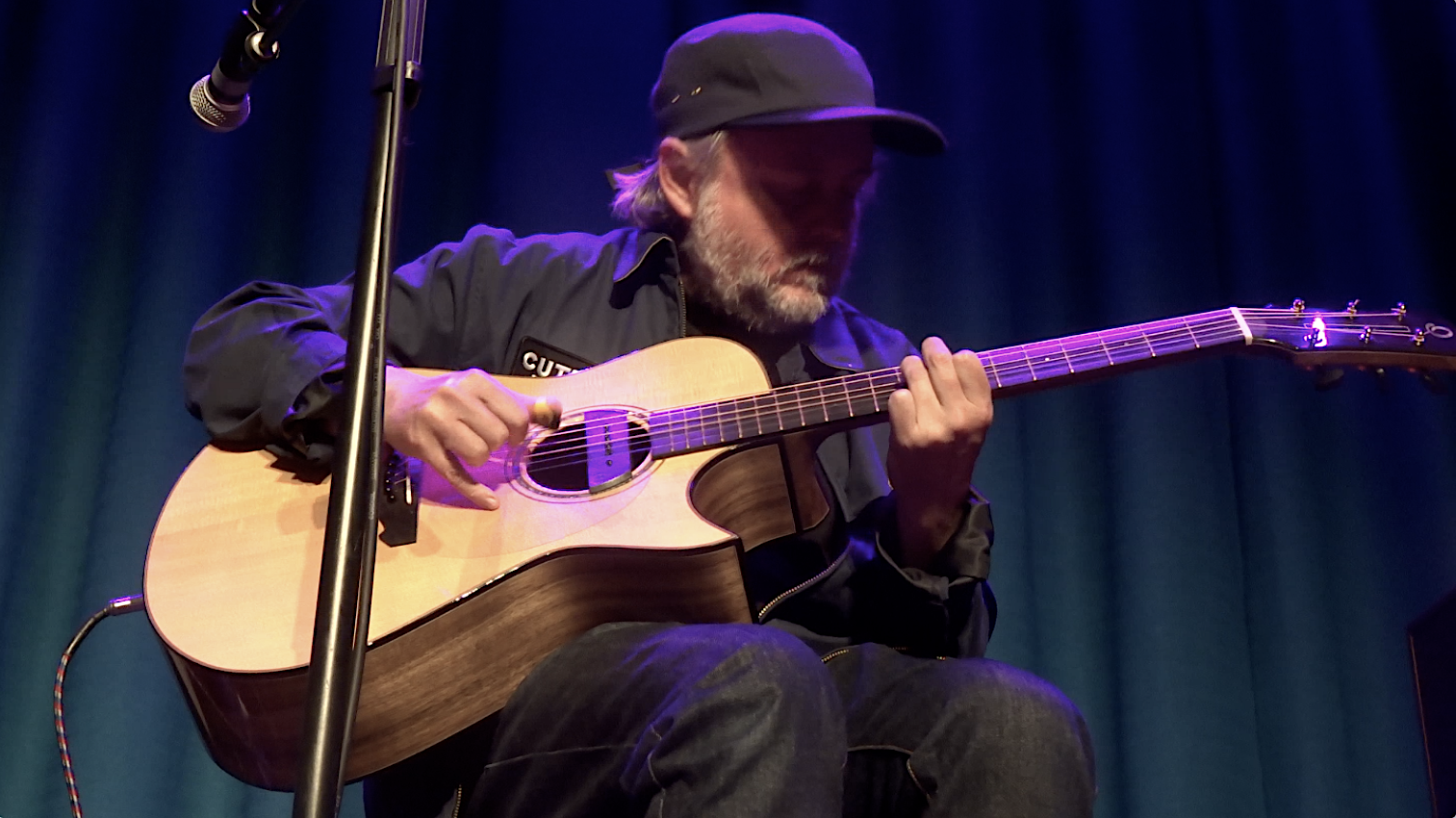
D.C Cross 1-12-23 Supporting Xylouris White, Wollongong, Australia.

=== Wizrad - Adventures into Ecstatic Guitar and Madcap Ambient (2023) ===
Cross released his fourth D.C Cross album Wizrad - Adventures into Ecstatic Guitar and Madcap Ambient (3 November 2023). Glenn Kimpton of Folk Radio Uk said "This one is a must for fans of the more experimental and adventurous side of the solo acoustic genre, as well as those who enjoy serious acoustic guitar flexing". and Bryget Chrisfield of Beat Magazine said " If you're feeling a bit broken, we reckon Wizrad will sort you right out. A liberating listening experience that unleashes creative thinking".
Wizrad is equally parts ecstatic primitive guitar and madcap ambient. Studying the acoustic guitar as a solo instrument even further, Cross this time brought in influences as far reaching as Doc Watson, Enya, Chuck Wild, Mississippi John Hurt and the Tacoma catalog to make something uniquely Australian.

Holger Adam of Austrian music journal Skug writes "plays inspired and instrumental acoustic guitar" and "the music effortlessly finds its place in the niche, which was put together by John Fahey and has been carefully developed and rebuilt since". Jim Marks of the United States-based Dusted Magazine said "At less than 40 minutes, Wizrad zips by, likely leaving listeners wishing for a longer record and digging into Cross's back catalog, which is well worth the effort. His approach to the guitar is tried and true, and his mastery of it is on display here, along with a knack for composing memorable tunes".
Peter Hollo of F.B.I Radio Utitily Fog says " Darren Cross made the journey from indie rock larrikinism with Gerling to folk songwriting and thence to the lovely expansive instrumental guitar music as D.C Cross. He's no pale imitator either - he knows how to make his guitar sing and thrum, and his D.C Cross albums do also wander off into ambient interludes and field recordings, in fine American Primitive form". Cross released a music video for the album's track "A Harebrained Adventure of an Amateur Shaman" (February 2024), which was directed and created by Steve Hanft (the Cure, Elliott Smith, Beck).

=== Glookies Guit (2024) ===
On 30 May 2024, Cross released his fifth D.C Cross record Glookies Guit. The album has seven solo guitar compositions and three ambient, Dusted Magazine said "Cross is emerging as an important voice among the modern players who continue to find new territory in the world of guitar discovered by John Fahey (who, of course, also experimented with found sounds and electronics). With the release of two fine albums in so short a time, he seems to be on a creative tear. Fans of Bachman, Isasa, Jones, Rolin, et al., take note" and KLOF magazine said "Glookies is a more serious and no-frills record in the structure of the guitar playing, with Cross happy to allow the beauty of the tunes to shine. The result is undoubtedly his most accomplished work to date". Cross recorded and produced the album himself.

=== D.C Cross - Live at the Red House (2025) ===
14 October 2025, Cross released the first live album of his career D.C Cross - Live at the Red House.

Alex Gallacher of the U.K's KLOF mag wrote " recording a live album always comes with some trepidation, as it captures all with no discretion, including musician and equipment errors, and not forgetting the unpredictable audience. As Cross says, “Sometimes the guitars play up with the crazy open tunings, roofs leak, children cry, drunks talk over my music,” but this gig went without a hitch".

Skug magazine said "following in the footsteps of John Fahey and alongside contemporary fingerstyle guitarists, D. C Cross goes his own way. He doesn’t stray from the orthodox path—but he doesn’t have to. Compositions like Rhinestones in Black and White update and enrich the fingerstyle guitar catalog, and it’s heartening to know that even in distant Australia, the search for Blind Joe Death continues."

=== Open Guitar - Volume One (2025) ===
Cross released his seventh D.C Cross album on December 5, 2025. The album consists of solo acoustic fingerstyle guitar using open tunings. The playing features layered parts and various techniques. The music includes melodies, breaks, and an Australian influence.

Glenn Kimpton of KLOF magazine said "And it is this lightness of touch that is present across Open Guitar, and that shows it comes from an artist very much in control of his craft. This is an album that feels open and honest; the emergency sirens briefly permeating the live recording of Ehrenfeld Summer Nights, which finish the album, feel significant: there can be calm in chaos. Open Guitar offers a sense of peace through the beauty of instrumental acoustic music, which feels like an important and welcome gesture."

Holger Adam of SKUG said "it can be wonderfully placed in the tradition of instrumental acoustic guitar music in the spirit of the great old people (Fahey, Basho, Rose…). Given this lineage and in relation to contemporary representatives* of the present (Gwenifer Raymond, Liam Grant, Shane Parish, Sam Grassie …)

=== Open Guitar - Volume Two (2026) ===
The second of his Open Guitar series, Cross recorded improvised open tuned Acoustic guitar tuned to 432Hz DADGAD in 13 different locations in New South Wales, Victoria and Queensland. Lars Gotrich from NPR and Tiny Desk concert on his Vikings Choice newsletter said "Three hours of DADGAD improvisations out in nature, with all the bird chirps and tractor rumbles left in. You really do fall into the environment quickly, soaking up the light between the leaves."

=== Dren Crss (2024) ===
24 October 2024, Cross released his debut album under the guise Dren Crss, which is his strictly ambient, experimental and ecstatic instrumental music. The album, (this is Ecstaticwave) was released on the bandcamp platform. Cross has added ambient compositions on all his albums but this is the first complete album of this nature.

In early 2026, Crss released "Beat-no for the Zinzin freenik", 10:58 of "Distorta Bliss". Bandcamp exclusive.

=== Andrew Tuttle and Darren Cross (2026) ===
2 October 2026, Cross released his debut album with Andrew Tuttle. The album is called "AT/DC" and was released on Lawrence English ROOM40 / Someone Good label.

Holger Adams at SKUG magazine writes "With guitar, banjo, synthesizer, electronic effects and field recordings, they have created eight ethereal-instrumental tracks that have a soothing effect on my consciousness. The gentle plucking pleasantly tickles the synapses, while the electronics wobble around them. That's exactly to my taste".

== Discography ==
=== Studio albums ===
Darren Cross

- Plankton Icke and Tina Turner David City Limits (2010) - megaupload release only
- _Xantastic (6 July 2016) – No Drums Records, Rockers Die Younger
- Peacer (19 July 2018) – No Drums Records
- Keeping Up? (6 November 2020) – No Drums Records (000007)
- Distorder (19 July 2021) – No Drums Records

D.C Cross

- Ecstatic Racquet (29 August 2019) – No Drums Records (000005)
- Terabithian (20 April 2020) – No Drums Records (000006)
- Hot-wire the Lay-low (Australian Escapist Pieces for Guitar) (5 February 2022) – No Drums Records (000007)
- Wizrad - Adventures in Ecstatic Guitar and Madcap Ambient (3 November 2023) – No Drums Records (000011)
- Glookies Guit (30 May 2024) – No Drums Records (000014)
- D.C Cross - Live at the Red House (14 October 2025) – No Drums Records (000015)
- Open Guitar - Volume One (5 December 2025) – No Drums Records (000017)
- Open Guitar - Volume Two (10 June 2026) – No Drums Records (000018)

Dren Crss

- (this is Ecstaticwave) (24 October 2024) – No Drums Records (000016)

Andres Tuttle and Darren Cross

AT/DC (2 October 2026) - Someone Good / ROOM40

=== Extended plays ===
Betty Airs

- Creepin' It Real (early 2011)

Darren Cross

- Freak Out Inn III (13 April 2013)
- No Damage (1 August 2014)
