= Feeling Sideways =

EP by The Mess Hall
- Released: 19 May 2003
- Recorded: 2003
- Studio: Milk Bar, Sydney
- Genre: Indie rock
- Length: 19:27
- Label: Cayman Island Mafia/Shock
- Producer: Chris Joannou; Matt Lovell; Anthony Johnsen; Jed Kurzel

The Mess Hall chronology
The Mess Hall (2001)	Feeling Sideways (2003)	Notes from a Ceiling (2005)

Feeling Sideways is a six-track extended play by Australian indie rock duo, the Mess Hall, released in May 2003. It was co-produced by band members, Anthony Johnsen and Jed Kurzel with Chris Joannou (of Silverchair) and Matt Lovell (Something for Kate) for Cayman Island Mafia/Shock Records. At the ARIA Music Awards of 2003 it was nominated for Best Independent Release. They followed with an Australian tour schedule, "both in support and headlining position."

== Track listing ==
All tracks are written by Anthony Johnsen and Jed Kurzel

Feeling Sideways Cayman Island Mafia Records (CIM0103)
No.	Title	Length
1.	"Lock and Load"	3:34
2.	"Railroad Rumble"	3:00
3.	"Shake, Shake"	4:29
4.	"Get Away"	4:01
5.	"Do It Again"	2:11
6.	"Feel Like a Dog"	2:09

== Personnel ==
The Mess Hall

- Anthony Johnsen – vocals, drums
- Jed Kurzel – vocals, guitar, harmonica

Additional musicians

- John Gauci – keyboards (track 3)

Recording details

- Producer – Anthony Johnsen, Jed Kurzel, Chris Joannou, Matt Lovell at Milk Bar Studios, Sydney
- Audio engineering – Matt Lovell
- Mastering engineer – Steve Smart at 301 Studios, Sydney
- Cover art – Love Police Action
