= Who's Ya Daddy? =

Single by Gerling

from the album Bad Blood!!!
- Released: March 2003
- Length: 3:45
- Songwriter(s): Paul Towner, Darren Cross, Burke Reid

Gerling singles chronology
| "Hot Computer" (2001) | "Who's Ya Daddy?" (2003) | "Get Activated" (2003) |

"Who's Ya Daddy?" is a song by Australian group Gerling. Released in March 2003 as the lead single released from their third studio album, Bad Blood!!!, the song peaked at number 77 on the ARIA charts.

The song was ranked at number 78 on the Triple J Hottest 100 of 2003.

At the time of release, singer Burke Reid said, "It's just a song that we've had kicking around for a while, it was one of the first ones that we'd written since going back into the studio then we just decided to throw it into our set when we were on tour for a while, so I guess it's a pretty old one now, from when we started picking at it over the past few months it's changed a bit."

At the ARIA Music Awards of 2003 the song was nominated for Best Dance Release and Best Video.

== Track listing ==
Australian CD single

1. "Who's Ya Daddy?" – 3:45
2. "Deepfryer (Ole!)" – 4:08
3. "Computerlife" – 2:58
4. "Community Control – 3:59
5. "Elector 4004" – 3:43

== Charts ==
| Chart (2003) | Peak position |
|---|---|
| Australia (ARIA) | 77 |
