= Notes from a Ceiling =

Notes From A Ceiling

Studio album by The Mess Hall
- Released: 20 June 2005
- Recorded: Byron Bay
- Genre: Indie rock
- Length: 43:36
- Label: Shock
- Producers: Matt Lovell; Chris Joannou

The Mess Hall chronology
Feeling Sideways (2003)	Notes From A Ceiling (2005)	Devils Elbow (2007)

Notes from a Ceiling is the second album from the Australian two-piece rock band The Mess Hall, which was issued on 20 June 2005. It peaked at No. 8 on the ARIA Hitseekers Albums Chart. It won an ARIA Music Award for Engineer of the Year for Matt Lovell, and a nomination for Producer of the Year for Chris Joannou and the group. It was short-listed for the inaugural Australian Music Prize and was included in both Triple J and Rolling Stone's Top 50 of 2005.

According to Jed Kurzel (vocalist/guitarist), the only recollection he has of recording the album is that Cec Condon (drummer/vocals) nearly set fire to the studio whilst barbecuing, and that while suffering vertigo, the attending doctor was more interested in whether the band were touring on the next Big Day Out than attending to his illness. In early 2004, Kurzel lived somewhat of a nomadic lifestyle. Having moved house once, he kept moving from friend's place to friend's place. His main memory of that year is "staring up at different ceilings, wondering what the hell I was doing" which is how the album title came about.

== Track listing ==
1. "Diddley" – 5:23
2. "Pills" – 4:00
3. "Call It Black" – 4:12
4. "Disco 1" – 3:59
5. "Skyline" – 6:01
6. "Shaky Ground" – 3:28
7. "Metal And Hair" – 2:35
8. "Disco 2" – 4:38
9. "Holes" – 2:41
10. "Red Eyes And Sunshine" – 6:34
