= Black Rat (album) =

2014 album by DZ Deathrays

Studio album by DZ Deathrays
- Released: 2 May 2014
- Recorded: December 2013–January 2014
- Studio: The Grove Studios, Somersby, NSW
- Genre: Dance-punk, noise rock, garage rock revival
- Length: 39:21
- Label: I Oh You (AUS), Dine Alone (CAN)
- Producer: Burke Reid

DZ Deathrays chronology
| Bloodstreams (2012) | Black Rat (2014) | Bloody Lovely (2018) |

Singles from Black Rat
- 1. "Northern Lights" Released: 13 November 2013; 2. "Gina Works At Hearts" Released: 13 March 2014; 3. "Reflective Skull" Released: 27 May 2014

Black Rat is the second studio album by Australian Dance-punk band DZ Deathrays. It was released by I Oh You Records in Australia and by Dine Alone Records in Canada on 2 May 2014. It was produced by former-Gerling frontman Burke Reid and recorded at the Grove Studios in Somersby from December 2013 to January 2014. It won at the ARIA Music Awards of 2014 for Best Hard Rock/Heavy Metal Album.

== Writing and recording ==
Most songs were written by both Shane Parsons and Simon Ridley. Writing began in early 2013 when the duo were together in the remote town of Yass, New South Wales. Once the two were happy with what they had, sometime after leaving Yass, they entered the Grove Studio with producer Burke Reid and over the course of six weeks they produced the album.

== Critical reception ==
Professional ratings
Aggregate scores
| Source | Rating |
|---|---|
| Metacritic | 77/100 |
Review scores
| Source | Rating |
| The AU Review | 6.9/10 |
| The Australian | 3.5/5 stars |
| NME | 8/10 stars |

The album met with generally favourable reviews. On Metacritic, which assigns a normalised rating out of 100 to reviews from critics, the album has an average score of 77 based on 6 reviews. In early May 2014, writing for the Australian newspaper, music journalist Andrew McMillen awarded Black Rat 3.5 stars out of a possible 5. McMillen compared their debut album Bloodstreams as juvenile alongside Black Rat, and writes that the more mature sound better suits the duo, as they move beyond their "trash party" origins. McMillen further praises the album's 11 songs as a "significant step forward" and concludes: "... it's [Black Rat] the sound of a confident band torn between its populist, party-friendly beginnings and a new-found ability to embrace glimpses of beauty amid the sonic destruction." On 18 May, the album peaked at No. 23 on the ARIA Charts for one week.

== Track listing ==
Track listing adapted from AllMusic.

All music is composed by DZ Deathrays (Shane Parsons, Simon Ridley), except where noted

| No. | Title | Length |
|---|---|---|
| 1. | "Black Rat" | 3:30 |
| 2. | "Gina Works at Hearts" | 3:36 |
| 3. | "Less Out of Sync" | 3:07 |
| 4. | "Reflective Skull" | 3:31 |
| 5. | "Keep Myself on Edge" | 3:34 |
| 6. | "Northern Lights" | 4:12 |
| 7. | "Nightwalking" | 4:07 |
| 8. | "Fixations" | 2:53 |
| 9. | "Ocean Exploder" | 4:03 |
| 10. | "Tonight Alright" | 2:52 |
| 11. | "Night Slave" | 3:56 |
| Total length: | | 39:21 |

== Personnel ==
=== DZ Deathrays ===
- Shane Parsons – lead vocals, guitars
- Simon Ridley – drums, percussion

=== Production ===
- Burke Reid – producer
- Simon Ridley – programming

== Charts ==
| Chart (2018) | Peak position |
|---|---|
| Australian Albums (ARIA) | 23 |
