= Automatic (Australian band) =

Australian rock band

- Genres: rock
- Years active: 1993 -
- Labels: Murmur
- Members: Matt Fenton; Alex Jarvis; Richard Taylor; Leigh Marlow

Automatic is an Australian rock band formed in Geelong in 1993 by Matt Fenton on guitar and vocals, Alex Jarvis on guitar (both ex-Spinouts), Leigh Marlow on drums and Richard Taylor on bass guitar.

Their single, "Sister K" was engineered by Tom Whitten who earned a nomination at the ARIA Music Awards of 1996 for Engineer of the Year for that and two other releases. "Pump it Up" was engineered by Magoo who earned a nomination in 1999 for the same category for that and one other release.

== Members ==
- Matt Fenton (guitar, vocals)
- Alex Jarvis (guitar)
- Richard Taylor (bass)
- Leigh Marlow (drums)
- Danny Plant (drums)
- Stuart McFarlane (drums)

== Discography ==
=== Albums ===
List of albums, with selected details
| Title | details |
|---|---|
| Transmitter | Released: 1996; Label: Murmur (MATTCD042); Formats: CD, LP |
| Get Together | Released: 1999; Label: Murmur (MATTCD090); Formats: CD |

=== Singles ===
List of singles, with selected chart positions
| Title | Year | Peak chart positions | Album |
| Title | Year | AUS | Album |
|---|---|---|---|
| "Sister K" | 1995 | - | non album single |
| "What If..." | 1996 | - | Transmitter |
| "It's Like Sound" | 1996 | 98 | Transmitter |
| "Another Up" | 1997 | - | Transmitter |
| "Five" | 1997 | - | Transmitter |
| "Pump It Up" | 1998 | 85 | Occasional Coarse Language soundtrack |
| "Psychic Cats" | 1998 | - | Get Together |
