= DZ Deathrays =

Australian band

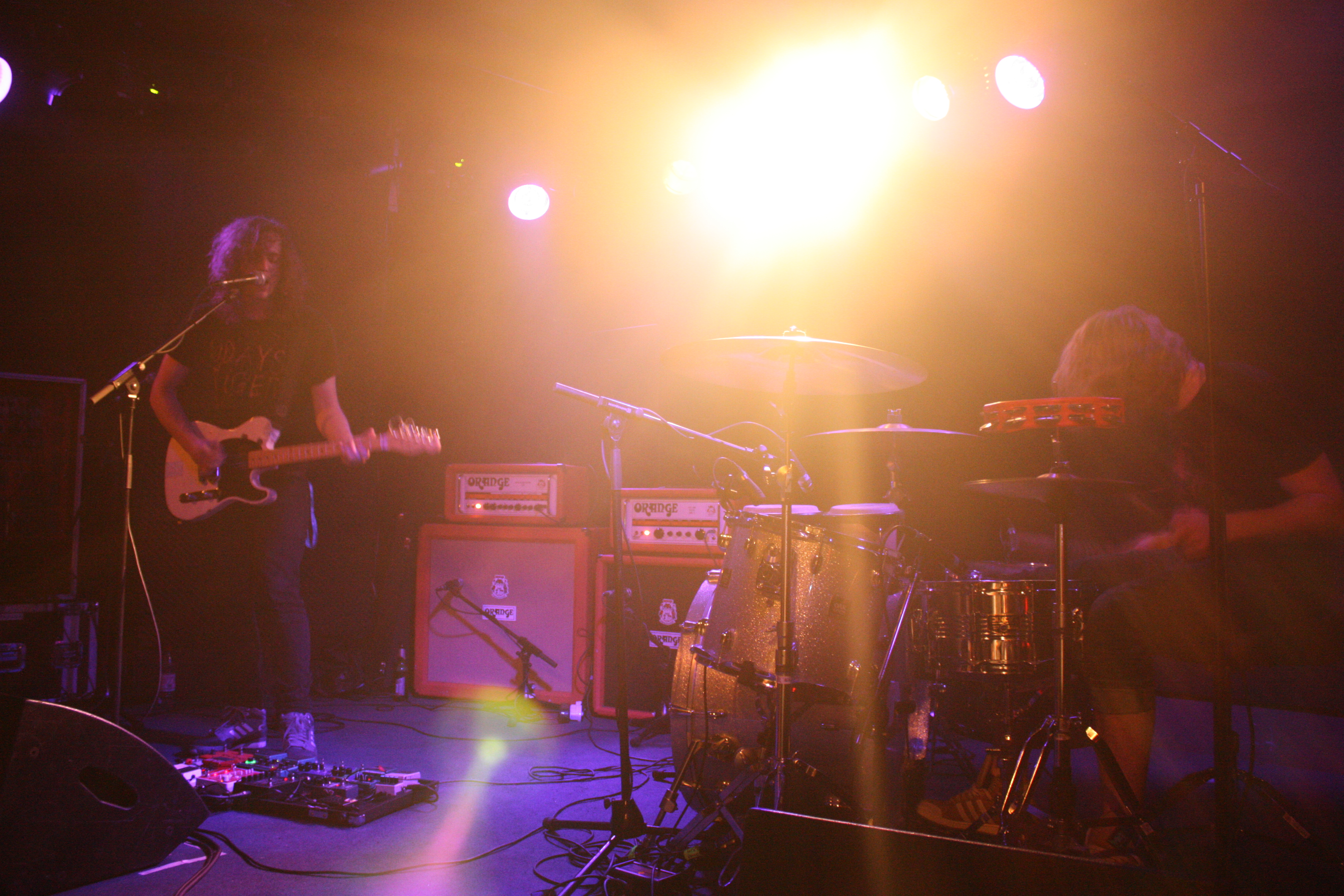
- DZ Deathrays performing in Berlin in 2011

Background information
- Also known as: DZ
- Origin: Brisbane, Queensland, Australia
- Genres: Dance-punk, noise rock, post-punk revival, indie rock
- Years active: 2008–present
- Labels: Useless Art; Illusive Sounds; I Oh You; Infectious; Dine Alone
- Members: Shane Parsons; Simon Ridley; Lachlan Ewbank
- Website: http://dzdeathrays.com

DZ Deathrays (previously Denzel then DZ) are an Australian dance-punk trio from Brisbane, Queensland. Composed of Shane Parsons (vocals/guitar), Lachlan Ewbank (lead guitar/vocals) and Simon Ridley (drums), they put out two EPs before releasing their debut album, Bloodstreams, in April 2012. The album won the ARIA Award for Best Hard Rock or Heavy Metal Album at the ARIA Music Awards of 2012. To date they have released six studio albums: Bloodstreams, Black Rat, Bloody Lovely, Positive Rising: Part 1, Positive Rising: Part 2 and R.I.F.F..

== History ==
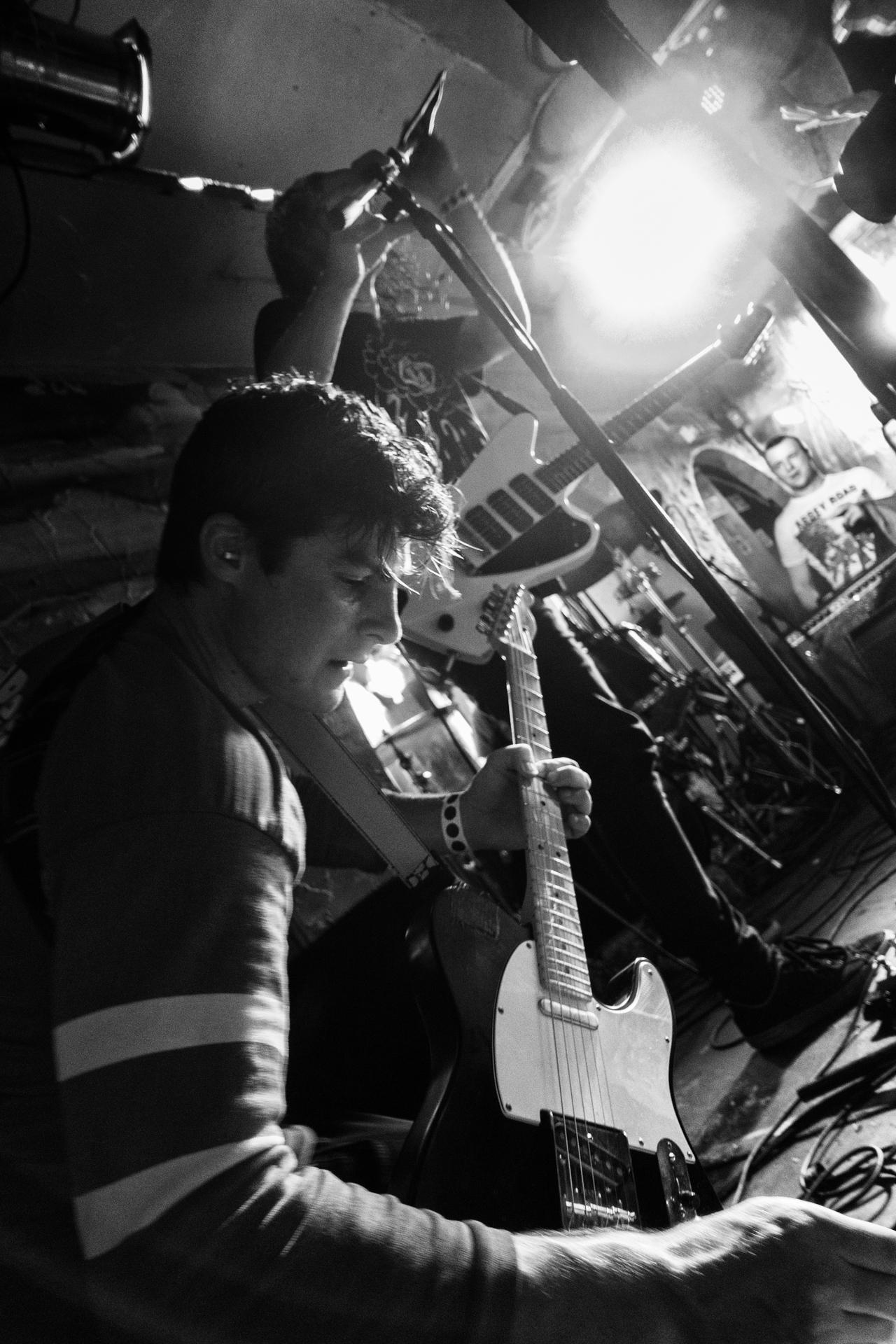
DZ Deathrays performing in 2014.

=== 2008–2011: Early years ===
Parsons and Ridley (both from Bundaberg, Queensland, Australia) were initially the founding members of Brisbane band Velociraptor, and continue to play with the group. Following the formation of DZ Deathrays, the band's first performances occurred at Brisbane house parties. The debut recording for the band was an EP, titled Ruined My Life, that was released in 2009 and its entire content was recorded live at a house party. The band's sophomore EP, Brutal Tapes, was released in January 2011 on their Bandcamp. A Re-issue containing more songs was released by label I Oh You, in 2014.

=== 2012–2013: Bloodstreams ===
DZ Deathrays released their debut album, Bloodstreams, in April 2012 and received praise from Pitchfork Media, with reviewer Laura Snapes writing that the album is "more than worth going deaf to." The album was co-produced by electro artist Richard Pike and was recorded in Queensland during a two-week period. It was released in the UK in May 2012 on the Hassle label and NME reviewer Kelly Murray explained: "This album has the potential to make your little sister want to shave her head and invest in mock leather hotpants. It’s the penned seduction of a weekend of irresponsibility and a Monday full of inferior excuses."

=== 2014–2016: Black Rat ===
The band's second album was recorded with producer Burke Reid at the Grove Studios complex, located adjacent to the Strickland Forest, north of Sydney, Australia, in January 2014. The band recorded with Reid for a two-week period—a 9 January Facebook post from the band read: "Producer Burke Reid tinkering away at about 3am. Sounding brutal." The band's press release for the album states that the recording is "a rich, deep collection of sounds, textures and arrangements". In the promotional material that accompanied review copies of the album, Parsons described the album as "definitely a night-time record. After 9pm; that's where it finds its place."

In early April 2014, the band signed with the Infectious Records music company for the release of Black Rat in the United Kingdom (UK). The band toured the UK during April 2014, appearing at the Liverpool Sound City event, prior to the UK release of the album in August 2014. The duo released their second studio album, Black Rat, in both Australia and the United States (US) in May 2014.

In early May 2014, writing for the Australian newspaper, music journalist Andrew McMillen awarded Black Rat 3.5 stars out of a possible 5. McMillen describes Bloodstreams as comparatively juvenile alongside Black Rat, and writes that the more mature sound better suits the duo, as they move beyond their "trash party" origins. McMillen further praises the album's 11 songs as a "significant step forward" and concludes: "... it's [Black Rat] the sound of a confident band torn between its populist, party-friendly beginnings and a new-found ability to embrace glimpses of beauty amid the sonic destruction." On 18 May, the album peaked at No. 23 on the ARIA Charts for one week.

=== 2017–2018: Bloody Lovely ===
The duo released the single "Shred for Summer" in August 2017, it placed within Australian radio station Triple J's Hottest 100, 2017 at no. 67. Their next single "Bad Influence" was released in September, with another, "Total Meltdown" following in November. "Total Meltdown" just missed out placing no. 109 within the Hottest 200 of 2017. The three singles would later be included in their third studio album.

Their third studio album, Bloody Lovely, was released on I Oh You Records and Alcopop! Records on 2 February 2018. Triple J picked it as their feature album of the week. Three days after the album was released the single "Like People" included in the album was released. The music video for the single featured one of the original members of The Wiggles, Murray Cook. On 18 February, the album peaked at No. 4 on the ARIA Charts and remained there for a total of two weeks. Then-touring guitarist Lachlan Ewbank helped in writing the album and was considered a fully-fledged member of the band. He was later officially inducted as a full-time member of the band.

On 14 September the band joined with The Gooch Palms for Like a Version on Triple J where they played their original, "Like People", and their cover of "Love Shack" by the B52s.

=== 2019–present: Positive Risings and R.I.F.F ===
On 10 January 2019, via DZ Deathrays' Twitter, the trio stated that they were about to commence recording their fourth studio album. On 14 January, it was announced that DZ Deathrays would perform a national tour titled "Tour With the Lot". The tour is set to run from March to April with support from Moaning Lisa and The Buoys. On 4 February, they confirmed that their fourth studio album was completed, further details are yet to be announced.

On 1 March 2019, coinciding with the beginning of their Tour With the Lot, DZ Deathrays released a new single entitled "Front Row Hustle". A reworking of their track "Afterglow" from their 2018 album, Bloody Lovely, remixed by Trials of A.B. Original. It features Briggs, also of A.B. Original, and rising star Jesswar. An accompanying music video preceded the single's release. On 14 June, their fourth studio album, Positive Rising: Part 1, was confirmed for a release of 30 August. On the same day, the trio released a new single "IN-TO-IT" alongside an accompanying music video.

In October 2020, the band released "Fired Up", the lead single from Positive Rising: Part 2, which was released on 9 July 2021.

On 5 April 2023 The band announced the forthcoming release of their 6th studio album R.I.F.F, proceeded by the singles "Paranoid", "King B" and "Tuff Luck".

In an album review, Ellie Robinson from NME said "The title stands for Remember It's for Fun, and here DZ Deathrays wholeheartedly embody that ethos."

== Touring ==
DZ Deathrays have toured throughout over 15 countries, including Australia, the UK, the US and Canada. In the promotional material for the band's second album, Parsons explained that the band had spent the preceding two years drinking and touring, a period in which the songs for Black Rat were created.

To promote Bloodstreams, the DZ Deathrays performed at festivals such as the Reading and Leeds Festivals (UK), the A Perfect Day Festival (Villafranca di Verona, Italy), Splendour in the Grass (Australia) and St Jerome's Laneway Festival (Australia), and headlined the NME stage at The Great Escape Festival, held in Brighton and Hove, UK. The band's performance at the US South by Southwest (SXSW) event in Austin, Texas was shortened, due to the extreme volume of their music. Musical touring partners include Blood Red Shoes, TRUST, Foo Fighters and Unknown Mortal Orchestra.

== Influences ==
In April 2014, Ridley identified seven albums that "changed his life" for the Australian Tone Deaf music website. Included in the list are Smash by The Offspring, which was not only the first album that Ridley owned, but "also the first album with swearing on it"; The Bronx's first self-titled album, "a psych up album for nights when I'm too tired but need to party"; Air's Moon Safari, which is an album that was listened to after Ridley would "come home from work every day" and "melt into the couch"—he stated that he now listens to the album on a weekly basis; and Rust in Peace by Megadeth, praised by Ridley for being "Metal how it should be!"

== Members ==
Current members

- Shane Parsons – lead vocals, guitar (2008–present)
- Simon Ridley – drums, percussion, backing vocals (2008–present)
- Lachlan Ewbank – guitar, backing vocals (2018–present; touring musician 2015–2018)

Current touring musicians

- Luke Henery – bass (2023–present)

Former touring musicians

- Mitchell 'Mood' Gregory – guitar (2014–2015)

== Discography ==
=== Studio albums ===
List of studio albums, with selected chart positions
Title	Album details	Peak chart positions
Title	Album details	AUS
Bloodstreams	Released: 6 April 2012; Label: Illusive Sounds	91
Black Rat	Released: 2 May 2014; Label: I Oh You	23
Bloody Lovely	Released: 2 February 2018; Label: I Oh You, Alcopop!	4
Positive Rising: Part 1	Released: 30 August 2019; Label: I Oh You, Alcopop!	21
Positive Rising: Part 2	Released: 9 July 2021; Label: I Oh You, Alcopop!	4
R.I.F.F	Released: 2 June 2023; Label: DZ Deathrays	8
Easing Out of Control	Released: 16 January 2026; Label: DZ Worldwide	44

=== Extended plays ===
List of extended plays
Title	Details
Ruined My Life	Released: 10 September 2009; Label: Useless Art
Brutal Tapes	Released: 4 January 2011; Label: Self-released

=== Singles ===
Title	Year	Album
"Gebbie Street"	2011	Bloodstreams
"Dollar Chills"	2012	Bloodstreams
"No Sleep"	2012	Bloodstreams
"Gina Works at Hearts"	2014	Black Rat
"Northern Lights"	2014	Black Rat
"Reflective Skull"	2014	Black Rat
"Blood on My Leather"	2016	Non-album singles
"Pollyana"	2016	Non-album singles
"Shred for Summer"	2017	Bloody Lovely
"Bad Influence"	2017	Bloody Lovely
"Total Meltdown"	2017	Bloody Lovely
"Like People"	2018	Bloody Lovely
"Front Row Hustle" (with Briggs, Jesswar and Trials)	2019	Non-album single
"IN-TO-IT"	2019	Positive Rising: Part 1
"Year of the Dog" (with Matt Caughthran)	2019	Positive Rising: Part 1
"Still No Change"	2019	Positive Rising: Part 1
"Run to Paradise"	2020	Non-album single
"Fired Up"	2020	Positive Rising: Part 2
"FU"	2020	Non-album single
"All or Nothing"	2021	Positive Rising: Part 2
"Say It to My Face"	2021	Positive Rising: Part 2 (Deluxe)
"King B"	2023	R.I.F.F.
"Paranoid"	2023	R.I.F.F.
"Tuff Luck"	2023	R.I.F.F.
"Safe & Warm" (with Mannequin Death Squad)	2024	Non-album singles
"Daybreak" (with Hellcat Speedracer)	2024	Non-album singles
"First Night Fever"	2024	Easing Out of Control
"Like No Other"	2025	Easing Out of Control
"Sideways"	2025	Easing Out of Control
"Real Love"	2025	Easing Out of Control
"Skyline"	2025	Easing Out of Control
"Pissing in the Breeze"	2025	Easing Out of Control

== Awards and nominations ==
=== AIR Awards ===
The Australian Independent Record Awards (commonly known informally as AIR Awards) is an annual awards night to recognise, promote and celebrate the success of Australia's Independent Music sector.

Year	Nominee / work	Award	Result
2012	Bloodstreams	Best Independent Album	Nominated
2012	Bloodstreams	Best Independent Hard Rock or Punk Album	Won
2014	Black Rat	Best Independent Hard Rock or Punk Album	Nominated
2019	Bloody Lovely	Best Independent Hard Rock, Heavy or Punk Album	Won
2020	Positive Rising: Part 1	Best Independent Punk Album or EP	Won
2022	Positive Rising: Part 2	Best Independent Punk Album or EP	Nominated

=== ARIA Music Awards ===
The ARIA Music Awards are a set of annual ceremonies presented by Australian Recording Industry Association (ARIA), which recognise excellence, innovation, and achievement across all genres of the music of Australia. They commenced in 1987.

Year	Nominee / work	Award	Result	Ref.
2012	Bloodstreams	Best Hard Rock/Heavy Metal Album	Won	
2014	Black Rat	Best Hard Rock/Heavy Metal Album	Won	
2014	Black Rat	Best Cover Art	Nominated	
2018	Bloody Lovely	Best Hard Rock/Heavy Metal Album	Nominated	
2019	Positive Rising: Part 1	Best Hard Rock/Heavy Metal Album	Nominated	
2023	R.I.F.F	Best Hard Rock/Heavy Metal Album	Nominated	
2026	Easing Out of Control	Best Hard Rock/Heavy Metal Album	Nominated	

=== J Awards ===
The J Awards are an annual series of Australian music awards that were established by the Australian Broadcasting Corporation's youth-focused radio station Triple J. They commenced in 2005.

Year	Nominee / work	Award	Result
2018	"Like People"	Australian Video of the Year	Nominated

=== National Live Music Awards ===
The National Live Music Awards (NLMAs) are a broad recognition of Australia's diverse live industry, celebrating the success of the Australian live scene. The awards commenced in 2016.

Year	Nominee / work	Award	Result
2016	themselves	Live Hard Rock Act of the Year	Nominated
2016	Simon Ridley (DZ Deathrays)	Live Drummer of the Year	Won
2019	themselves	Live Hard Rock Act of the Year	Nominated

=== Queensland Music Awards ===
The Queensland Music Awards (previously known as Q Song Awards) are annual awards celebrating Queensland, Australia's brightest emerging artists and established legends. They commenced in 2006.

Year	Nominee / work	Award	Result (wins only)
2011	"Gebbie Street"	Rock Song of the Year	Won
2012	themselves	Export Achievement Award	awardeded
2020	"Still No Change"	Heavy Song of the Year	Won
2023	"Paranoid"	Heavy Song of the Year	Won
2024	"My Mind Is Eating Me Alive"	Heavy Song of the Year	Won
2026	"Skyline"	Rock Award	Won

== See also ==
- Music in Brisbane
