= Self Talk =

Self talk

Studio album by Olympia
- Released: 29 April 2016
- Studio: The Grove Studios, Somersby; St. Charles Studios, Melbourne
- Genre: Indie pop, Dream pop, Art pop, Indie rock
- Length: 41:20
- Label: EMI, UMA
- Producer: Burke Reid

Olympia chronology
Olympia (2013)	Self talk (2016)	Flamingo (2019)

Singles from Self Talk
- 1. "Honey" Released: February 2015; 2. "This Is Why We Can't Have Nice Things" Released: April 2015; 3. "Tourists" Released: October 2015; 4. "Smoke Signals" Released: March 2016; 5. "Somewhere to Disappear" Released: 10 June 2016

Self Talk is the debut studio album by Australian alt-pop singer songwriter Olympia. The album was released on 29 April 2016 and peaked at number 26 on the ARIA Charts.

== Reception ==
Professional ratings
Review scores
Source	Rating
Beat Magazine	4/5 stars
Herald Sun	4.5/5 stars

Holly Pereira from Beat Magazine gave the album 4 out of 5 stars calling the album "ambitious" saying "Summing up Olympia is no easy task, with Self Talk exploring many different musical styles and themes to the point that no two tracks sound the same. The experimentation and pop sensibilities intrinsic to Bartley's music are enthralling, distinguishing her as one of the most dynamic performers in Australia at the moment."

Mikey Cahill from Herald Sun gave the album 4.5 out of 5 calling the album "startling" saying "every song is a triple threat of concept, song and execution" and called 'Smoke Signals' the Oz single of the year.

== Track listing ==
No.	Title	Writer(s)	Length
1.	"Honey"	Olivia Bartley	3:44
2.	"Smoke Signals"	Bartley	4:01
3.	"Fishing Knots / Blood Vessels"	Bartley; Thomas Rawle	3:54
4.	"This is Why We Can't Have Nice Things"	Bartley	3:42
5.	"Different Cities"	Bartley	3:54
6.	"Somewhere to Disappear"	Bartley	3:54
7.	"Self Talk"	Bartley	3:58
8.	"Tourists"	Bartley	3:20
9.	"Biscuits"	Bartley	2:48
10.	"Blue Light Disco"	Bartley	4:25
11.	"Opening Hours"	Bartley	3:26
Total length:			41:20

== Charts ==
Chart (2016)	Peak position
Australian Albums (ARIA)	26

== Release history ==
Country	Date	Format	Label	Catalogue
Australia	29 April 2016	Digital download, CD,	EMI Music / Universal Music Australia	4781766
Australia	20 May 2016	Vinly	EMI Music	4781765
