= Flamingo (Olympia album) =

Studio album by Olympia
- Released: 5 July 2019
- Genre: Indie pop, synth-pop
- Label: EMI; UMA
- Producer: Burke Reid

Olympia chronology
| Self Talk (2016) | Flamingo (2019) |

Singles from Flamingo
- 1. "Star City" Released: 21 August 2018; 2. "Shoot to Forget" Released: 21 February 2019; 3. "Hounds" Released: May 2019

Flamingo is the second studio album by Australian alt-pop singer songwriter Olympia, released on 5 July 2019.

Upon release Olympia said "The record explores how grief and desire are intertwined. It's referencing a personal tragedy – the addiction and loss of someone very close to me, but it's not a project of catharsis – I chose to submit myself to this experience because I wanted to create from inside it, rather than explaining it. I've tried to borrow from my own grief to create its inverse: something joyous. Something beyond myself, something fantastic - something new. It's the most personal I've ever been, but also the most confident. This album is a force."

== Reception ==
Professional ratings
Review scores
| Source | Rating |
|---|---|
| The Music AU | 3.5/5 stars |

Carley Hall from The Music AU said the album "Where [her debut album] pleased with angular, resonant guitars amid uncomplicated, upbeat motifs and musings on relationships and everyday curveballs in life, Flamingo adds a little more lacquer by slightly glossing over these elements. There are thick walls of interesting sounds and textures in 'Star City', 'Hounds' and 'Two Hands' with her Blondie-esque vocals, which are immediately likeable and don't get lost in the wash like on some of the other bangers. Sparser tracks like 'Easy Pleasure' and 'Nervous Riders' offer some other facets to a polished if not perfect second album."

== Track listing ==
| No. | Title | Writer(s) | Length |
|---|---|---|---|
| 1. | "Star City" | Olivia Bartley | 3:25 |
| 2. | "Come Back" | | 3:47 |
| 3. | "Easy Pleasure" | | 3:34 |
| 4. | "Nervous Riders" | | 3:04 |
| 5. | "Hounds" | | 3:38 |
| 6. | "Won't Say That" | | 2:54 |
| 7. | "Two Hands" | | 2:58 |
| 8. | "Shoot to Forget" | | 2:58 |
| 9. | "First You Leave" | | 4:00 |
| 10. | "Flamingo" | | 3:12 |
| 11. | "Wrong Number" | | 3:31 |

== Charts ==
| Chart (2019) | Peak position |
|---|---|
| Australian Albums (ARIA) | 100 |

== Release history ==
| Country | Date | Format | Label | Catalogue |
|---|---|---|---|---|
| Australia | 5 July 2019 | Digital download, CD, vinyl | EMI Music / Universal Music Australia | 4781766 / 7746238 |
