= The E.L.F. =

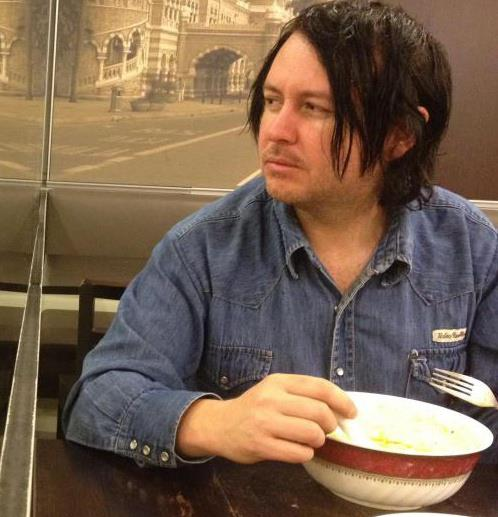
- The E.L.F April 2012

Background information
- Origin: Sydney, Australia
- Genres: Folk, lo-fi, Freak folk, country
- Occupation: Musician
- Years active: 2007-present
- Label: Oaks
- Members: Darren Cross

The E.L.F. is a musician and music producer formed by ex-Gerling frontman Darren Cross based in Sydney, Australia, mainly working from his music production company Bernstein Studios.

== History ==
With Gerling announcing in 2007 that they were going on an indefinite hiatus, Darren Cross began recording his debut self-produced solo E.L.F. EP Stevie Nicks Hearts at his home studio in Sydney. Along with this, Darren started up his own record label "Oaks Records". Darren has collaborated with many different and diverse artists over his career, including Cornelius, Kylie Minogue, The Avalanches and Kool Keith.

In June 2008 The E.L.F. contributed his track "Cockroaches" to an indie compilation album titled Indiecater Vol. 1.

As of late December 2010 the E.L.F released his new album "Plankton Icke and Tina Turner David City Limits" as a free online downloadable album on the now defunct Megaupload and was downloaded over 30,000 times.

== Discography ==
Date of Release	Title	Label	Country	Catalog Number
Albums
2010	Plankton Icke and Tina Turner David City Limits	Oaks Records	Australia	
EPs
2008	Stevie Nicks Hearts	Oaks Records	Australia	ELF001
2008	Sunray in the Rave Cave	Oaks Records	Australia	ELF002

== Stevie Nicks Hearts ==
Track listing:

1. "Stevie Nicks Hearts" – 3:16
2. "Cockroaches" – 4:03
3. "Billie" – 3:01
4. "Takemeback" – 3:07
5. "Billie (waterslides-trey whitty remix)" – 5:48

== Sunray in the Rave Cave ==
Track listing:

1. "Rave Cave" – 3:22
2. "Big Eyed Kids" – 3:28
3. "You Can't Fire Me" – 3:43
4. "Bounce Bounce Bounce" – 3:29
5. "Stevie Nicks Hearts-ONEMANPARTY REMIX" – 6:18
