= Jed Kurzel =

Australian singer-songwriter (born 1976)

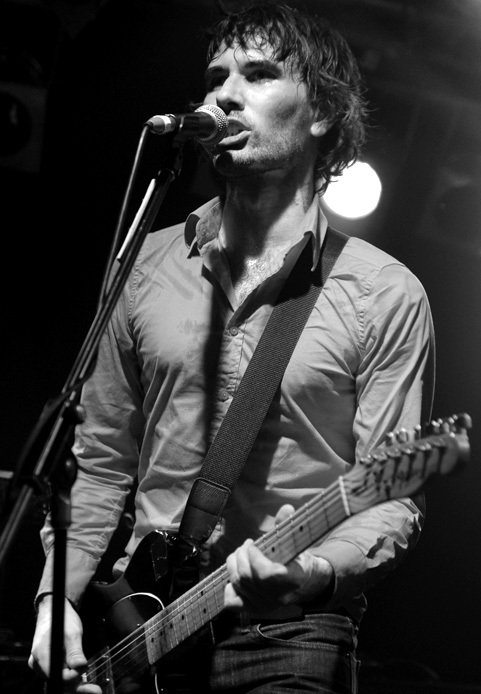
- Kurzel live with The Mess Hall in 2009

Background information
- Born: Jed Danyel Kurzel; 1976 (age 49–50); Gawler, South Australia, Australia
- Genres: Blues rock; indie rock; garage rock
- Occupations: Musician, composer
- Instruments: Vocals, guitar

Jed Danyel Kurzel (born 1976) is an Australian singer-songwriter-guitarist and film composer. He is a founding member of The Mess Hall (from 2001), a blues rock duo. His older brother Justin Kurzel is a film director and screenwriter.

== Early life ==
Kurzel was born in c.1976 and, with his older brother Justin Kurzel (born c.1974), grew up in Gawler, South Australia. Their father, Zdzislaw Kurzel (1946–2006), was from Poland and had migrated to Australia in 1960, where he became a taxi driver. In the 1990s, Kurzel moved to Sydney, where Justin was studying at the National Institute of Dramatic Art (NIDA).

== Career ==
In 2001 Kurzel on lead vocals and guitar, Anthony Johnsen on drums and a bass guitarist formed a blues-rock group, the Mess Hall in Sydney – the bass guitarist soon left but was not replaced, they continued as a duo. Kurzel recalled "When the clubs asked us where our bass player was, we used to lie and say he was sick." Their debut album The Mess Hall was released in June 2003. In early 2004 Johnsen was replaced by Cec Condon on drums and vocals. Their third album Devils Elbow (October 2007) won the Australian Music Prize.

In 2000 Kurzel composed the film score for the short subject, Sammy Blue, at the Australian Film, Television and Radio School, with Kim Farrant directing. He worked for Farrant again: providing the score for Naked on the Inside (2006), a feature film documentary on body image. In 2009 he composed music for Castor & Pollux, a short film, directed by Ben Briand.

In 2011 Kurzel provided the music score for the directorial debut feature film by Justin, Snowtown. At the APRA-AGSC Screen Music Awards of 2011 Kurzel won Feature Film Score of the Year. It was nominated for Australian Film Institute Award for Best Original Music Score. The related soundtrack album was nominated for ARIA Award for Best Original Soundtrack, Cast or Show Album in that same year.

Kurzel also wrote the scores for Son of a Gun, Slow West and the documentary All This Mayhem. In 2015, he worked again with his brother on Macbeth, followed by Assassin's Creed in 2016. He replaced Harry Gregson-Williams as the composer of Alien: Covenant.

== Filmography ==
=== Film ===
Year	Title	Director	Studio(s)	Notes
2011	Snowtown	Justin Kurzel	Screen Australia; Madman Entertainment	First collaboration with Justin Kurzel; Soundtrack released by Ivy League Records APRA Music Award for Feature Film Score of the Year; Nominated — ARIA Award for Best Original Soundtrack, Cast or Show Album; Nominated — AACTA Award for Best Original Music Score
2012	Dead Europe	Tony Krawitz	See-Saw Films	Nominated — AACTA Award for Best Original Music Score
2014	Son of a Gun	Julius Avery	Screen Australia; A24	First collaboration with Julius Avery Soundtrack released by Milan Records
2014	The Babadook	Jennifer Kent	Entertainment One; Umbrella Entertainment	First collaboration with Jennifer Kent Soundtrack released by Waxwork Records
2015	Slow West	John Maclean	Film4 Productions; Lionsgate Films	Soundtrack released by Sony Classical Records
2015	Macbeth	Justin Kurzel	StudioCanal; The Weinstein Company	Second collaboration with Justin Kurzel; Soundtrack released by Decca Records
2016	Assassin's Creed	Justin Kurzel	Regency Enterprises; Ubisoft Motion Pictures; 20th Century Fox	Third collaboration with Justin Kurzel; Soundtrack released by Decca Records and Verve Records
2016	Una	Benedict Andrews	Film4 Productions; Thunderbird Releasing	
2017	Alien: Covenant	Ridley Scott	Scott Free Productions; 20th Century Fox	Replaced Harry Gregson-Williams; Themes by Jerry Goldsmith; Soundtrack released by Milan Records
2017	Jupiter's Moon	Kornél Mundruczó	ZDF/Arte; Match Factory Productions; Pyramide Films	Soundtrack released by Milan Records
2018	The Nightingale	Jennifer Kent	Bron Studios; IFC Films; Transmission Films	Second collaboration with Jennifer Kent
2018	Overlord	Julius Avery	Bad Robot; Paramount Pictures	Second collaboration with Julius Avery Soundtrack released by Paramount Music
2019	The Mustang	Laure de Clermont-Tonnerre	Légende Films; Focus Features	Soundtrack released by Back Lot Music
2019	Seberg	Benedict Andrews	Phreaker Films; Amazon Studios	
2019	True History of the Kelly Gang	Justin Kurzel	Daybreak Pictures; Porchlight Films; Memento Films	Fourth collaboration with Justin Kurzel
2021	A Writer's Odyssey	Lu Yang	CMC Productions	
2021	Nitram	Justin Kurzel	Good Thing Productions	Fifth collaboration with Justin Kurzel
2021	Encounter	Michael Pearce	Amazon Studios; Film4 Productions	
2023	The Pope's Exorcist	Julius Avery	Screen Gems	Third Collaboration with Julius Avery
2024	Monkey Man	Dev Patel	Universal Pictures	Replaced Volker Bertelmann
2024	The Order	Justin Kurzel	Amazon Studios	Sixth collaboration with Justin Kurzel
2025	Echo Valley	Michael Pearce	Apple Studios	Second collaboration with Michael Pearce
2025	Tornado	John Maclean	Lionsgate	
2026	Leviticus	Adrian Chiarella	Causeway Films	Soundtrack released by Lakeshore Records

=== Television ===
Year	Title	Studio	Director	Notes
2010-2011	Spirited	Northside Productions / Southern Star Entertainment	-	Australian TV series (18 episodes)
2025	The Narrow Road to the Deep North	Amazon MGM Studios	Justin Kurzel	Miniseries

=== Documentaries ===
Year	Title	Director	Studio(s)	Notes
2007	Naked on the Inside	Kim Farrant	Magic Real Picture Company	
2014	All This Mayhem	Eddie Martin	Hopscotch Films	AACTA Award for Best Original Music Score in a Documentary

=== Shorts ===
Year	Title	Director	Studio(s)
2000	Sammy Blue	Kim Farrant	AFTRS
2007	The Rose of Ba Ziz	Aden Young	
2009	Castor & Pollux	Ben Briand	Benah
2014	Dook Stole Christmas	Jennifer Kent	Smoking Gun Productions

== Awards and nominations ==
=== ARIA Music Awards ===
The ARIA Music Awards is an annual awards ceremony held by the Australian Recording Industry Association. They commenced in 1987.

Year	Nominee / work	Award	Result	Ref.
2011	Snowtown	Best Original Soundtrack, Cast or Show Album	Nominated	
