= Bloodstreams =

Studio album by DZ Deathrays
- Released: April 2012
- Studio: The White Room, Brisbane, Australia
- Length: 41:24
- Label: I Oh You; Illusive Sounds
- Producer: Richard Pike, Neil Coombe

DZ Deathrays chronology
Brutal Tapes (2011)	Bloodstreams (2012)	Black Album (2014)

Singles from Bloodstreams
- 1. "Gebbie Street" Released: 2011; 2. "Dollar Chills" Released: January 2012; 3. "No Sleep" Released: March 2012

Bloodstreams is the debut studio album by Australian dance-punk band DZ Deathrays. It was released by I Oh You Records in Australia in April 2012.

At the ARIA Music Awards of 2012 it was the ARIA Award for Best Hard Rock or Heavy Metal Album.

Following its 10 Year Anniversary Vinyl Re-Press in April 2022, the album made its ARIA chart debut.

== Track listing ==
1. "Bloodstreams"
2. "Teenage Kickstarts"
3. "Dollar Chills"
4. "Dinomight"
5. "Play Dead Till You're Dead"
6. "Cops Capacity"
7. "Brains"
8. "Gebbie Street"
9. "No Sleep"
10. "Debt Death"
11. "Dumb It Down"
12. "L.A. Lightning"
13. "Trans Am"

== Charts ==
Chart performance for Bloodstreams
Chart (2022)	Peak position
Australian Albums (ARIA)	91
