= Gerling =

Australian band formed in 1993

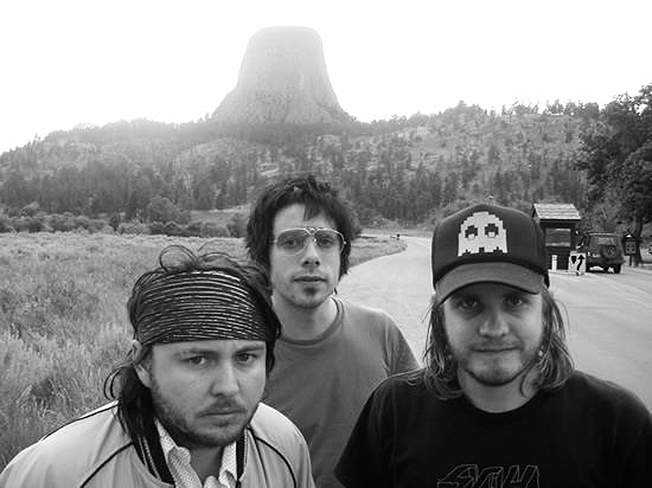
- Early 2000s

Background information
- Origin: Sydney, New South Wales, Australia
- Genres: Electronic; alternative rock; pop
- Years active: 1993–2007
- Labels: Fellaheen; Reliant/Fiido/Festival; Trifekta
- Past members: Brad Herdson; Presser (aka Paul Towner); Darren Cross; Ben Lee; Burke Reid

Gerling were an Australian electronica, alternative rock trio formed in 1993. From early 1997 the members were Darren Cross on guitar and lead vocals, Presser (real name Paul Towner) on drums and Burke Reid on guitar and vocals. Their second album, When Young Terrorists Chase the Sun (September 2001), reached the ARIA Albums Chart top 50. It provided a top 50 single, "Dust Me Selecta" (August 2001). The group disbanded in 2007.

== History ==
Gerling were formed as a guitar pop trio in 1993 in western Sydney with the line-up of Darren Cross (aka Darren E. Spielberg-Cross) on guitar and lead vocals, Presser (real name Paul Towner) on drums and Brad Herdson on guitar and vocals. With only two guitars and drums, the group initially played cover versions of W.A.S.P. material. Then they focussed on creating experimental guitar pop, with their debut single, "Sedatives for Dead Radars", issued in 1995 on Steven Stavrakis' Fellaheen label.

It was followed by a seven-track extended play, A Day of Research, in 1996. It reached No. 13 on the ARIA Alternative Albums Chart. Australian musicologist, Ian McFarlane, felt it was a "mix of early Pavement-style lo-fi guitar pop and idiosyncratic backing, it garnered widespread interest among the indie cognoscenti." Some of its tracks received high rotation on national youth radio station, Triple J.

Early in 1997 Herdson left to form Sonic Emotion Explosion, with Liz Payne from Spdfgh. He was temporarily replaced in Gerling by Ben Lee for their gig at Big Day Out, Sydney, in late January. Herdson's long-term replacement, on guitar, was Canadian-born, Burke Reid. In February 1998 the group issued a four-track 7-inch EP, Bachelor Pad on the Trifekta label. The label had been partly established in the previous year by Towner.

In October 1998 they issued, "Death to the Apple Gerls", on Festival's in-house indie label Reliant – which was set up by Bruce Milne (former CEO of Au Go Go Records). In the following month they released their debut album, Children of Telepathic Experiences, which peaked at No. 21 on the ARIA Alternative Albums Chart. McFarlane noticed "an entertaining mix of Gerling's live punky-pop sound and a background of layered electronica." For the first time the group incorporated electronica in their music, they also built a recording studio, Gerlog, in Alexandria where band members produced and remixed tracks.

Their next single, "Enter, Space Capsule" (April 1999), provided four versions of the song, including one at Gerlog by band members and one mixed by Josh Abrahams. McFarlane saw this as the group's "move deeper into the realms of abstract electronica." At the ARIA Music Awards of 1999 Gerling were nominated in three categories: Breakthrough Artist – Album and ARIA Award for Best Alternative Release for Children of Telepathic Experiences and Breakthrough Artist – Single for "Enter, Space Capsule". Another single, "Ghost Patrol", followed in September, which featured guest lead vocals by Naoko Matsumoto of Sydney-based group Funky Terrorist.

During 2000 they toured the United Kingdom where they recorded, "G-House Project", with lead vocals provided by Kylie Minogue. Gerling issued a single late in the year, "The Deer in You", which peaked at No. 12 on the ARIA Alternative Singles Chart. Cameron Webb of Oz Music Project described as "Hovering somewhere between the frantic mesh of screaming and guitars of 'Death to the Apple Gerls' and electro blips and beats of 'Enter, Space Capsule', 'The Deer in You' provides an enticing glimpse at their new recordings. The single doesn't suggest any great departure musically, just a reminder of what Gerling do best – pop music." At the ARIA Music Awards of 2001 they were nominated for Best Video for Paul Butler and Scott Walton's directorial work on "The Deer in You".

Gerling's second studio album, When Young Terrorists Chase the Sun, was released on 24 September 2001 after being postponed due to the September 11 attacks earlier that month and a title change to the less controversial, Headzcleaner, for international markets. It peaked in the ARIA and New Zealand Albums Chart Top 50s. Oz Music Project's Nick Coppack felt it was a "stunning follow-up", which "blends the band's love for electronic sounds and dance music with fuzzy guitars and aggressive vocals, which stem from the band's early punk roots." Australian music journalist Ed Nimmervoll declared it his Album of the Week, "[they are] forging a new path for contemporary music by embracing technology to go where technology is leading, but at the same time using the freedom technology brings to head off into other areas of interest."

The band became increasingly electronic they had success in the dance scene and mainstream charts with the earlier single, "Dust Me Selecta" (August 2001), which reached the ARIA Singles Chart Top 50. Lou Lou of Oz Music Project praised it as "Keeping it fresh and funky... just when you’ve got your head around this disco funk, the booming synth voice jumps in, slaps you in the face and reminds you that it is indeed Gerling @ the controls." At the ARIA Music Awards of 2002 they received three more nominations: Best Dance Release and Best Video (directed by Jolyon Watkins) for "Dust My Selecta", and Producer of the Year for When Young Terrorists Chase the Sun (by Gerling and Magoo).

On 18 August 2003 they released their third studio album, Bad Blood!!!, which peaked in the Top 60. They had recorded it at Gerlog with Magoo producing. Oz Music Project's Semone Maksimovic felt the group were "dipping their hand into the increasingly popular electro clash, disco punk bucket to fill their hands with both dirt and glitter to throw our way... [it is] more indicative of their capricious live shows, danceable, loud, catchy, energetic and easy to digest, it's a record that will go down well in clubs or to help liven up a party, even a good driving record, but one rule remains, it has to be up loud!" The album marked a return to form as guitars returned to the mix, whilst still retaining an electronic edge. The lead single, "Who's Ya Daddy?" (March 2003), reached the Top 100. Maksimovic described it as "a mighty fine slice of sexy, trashy disco punk for us all to enjoy... [it] brings to mind The Detroit Grand Poobah's 'Sandwiches' am"

Their fourth studio album, 4, was released on 20 March 2006, which reached the Top 100. The original recording was carried out in the function room of the Annandale Hotel, Sydney, before being re-recorded and mastered in Los Angeles. It was produced by Ethan Johns, who also worked on Aha Shake Heartbreak with Kings of Leon. "Turning the Screws" was the iTunes featured download of the week in February 2006.

The band have been on an indefinite hiatus since September 2007.

== Post-hiatus ==
After disbandment, Cross spent four years (from 2007 to 2010) as the E.L.F., writing and performing dance music. From 2012 he turned to folk and alt-country traditional song writing structures and styling, releasing and touring as a solo artist. He received a positive review from No Depression for his album, No Damage. He also performed and recorded in a folk Noir duo, Jep and Dep (2012–2019), with Jessica Cassar. Jep and Dep's debut album, Word Got Out received 4 out of 5 stars from The Sydney Morning Herald's Bernard Zuel and Rolling Stone Australia As of 2024, Cross has released five instrumental guitar albums under the moniker D.C Cross, Ecstatic Racquet (2019), Terabithian (2020), Hot-wire the Lay-low (2022), Wizrad (2023) and Glookies Guit (2024) . Tone Deaf's Tyler Jenke observed: "Terabithian is a high watermark of instrumental music".

In 2012 Cross also launched music and film production company, Bernstein Studios (Sydney) and has co-written songs with Jagwar Ma.

Towner produces visual art under the moniker, Dead Galaxy, and Reid has a career in music production.

== Discography ==
=== Studio albums ===
List of studio albums, with selected details and chart positions
| Title | Album details | Peak chart positions | |
| Title | Album details | AUS | NZ |
|---|---|---|---|
| Children of Telepathic Experiences | Released: 1998; Label: Reliant (NC17-0003); Formats: CD | — | — |
| When Young Terrorists Chase the Sun | Released: September 2001; Label: Festival Mushroom (33441-2); Formats: CD, CD-ROM | 41 | 50 |
| Bad Blood | Released: August 2003; Label: Festival Mushroom (33675-2); Formats: CD, CD-ROM | 57 | — |
| 4 | Released: March 2006; Label: Warner Music Australia (5101-12774-2 F); Formats: CD, digital | 78 | — |

=== Extended plays ===
List of EPs, with selected details
| Title | Album details |
|---|---|
| Sedatives for Dead Radars | Released: 1995; Label: Fellaheen (JacK 034–7); Formats: LP |
| A Day of Research | Released: 1996; Label: Fellaheen (JacK 042–2); Formats: CD |

=== Singles ===
| Year | Title | Peak chart positions | | | Album |
| Year | Title | AUS | Triple J Hottest 100 | UK | Album |
|---|---|---|---|---|---|
| 1998 | "Bachelor Pad" | — | — | — | Children of Telepathic Experiences |
| 1998 | "Death to the Apple Gerls" | — | — | — | Children of Telepathic Experiences |
| 1999 | "Enter, Space Capsule" | 57 | 45 | 150 | Children of Telepathic Experiences |
| 1999 | "Ghost Patrol" | — | — | — | Children of Telepathic Experiences |
| 2000 | "Children of Telepathic Experiences" (UK only) | —N/a | — | — | Children of Telepathic Experiences |
| 2000 | "Suburban Jungle Sleeping Bag" (UK only) | —N/a | — | — | Children of Telepathic Experiences |
| 2000 | "The Deer in You" | — | — | 179 | When Young Terrorists Chase the Sun |
| 2001 | "Dust Me Selecta" | 47 | 24 | — | When Young Terrorists Chase the Sun |
| 2001 | "Hot Computer" | 95 | — | — | When Young Terrorists Chase the Sun |
| 2003 | "Who's Ya Daddy?" | 77 | 78 | — | Bad Blood!!! |
| 2003 | "Get Activated" | — | — | — | Bad Blood!!! |
| 2006 | "Turning the Screws" | — | — | — | 4 |

== Awards ==
=== ARIA Music Awards ===
The ARIA Music Awards is an annual awards ceremony that recognises excellence, innovation, and achievement across all genres of Australian music. They commenced in 1987. Gerling were nominated for ten awards.

| Year | Nominee / work | Award | Result |
|---|---|---|---|
| 1999 | Children of Telepathic Experiences | Best Adult Alternative Album | Nominated |
| 1999 | Children of Telepathic Experiences | Breakthrough Artist - Album | Nominated |
| 1999 | "Enter, Space Capsule" | Breakthrough Artist - Single | Nominated |
| 2001 | Paul Butler and Scott Walton for Gerling "The Deer in You" | Best Video | Nominated |
| 2002 | "Dust Me Selecta" | Best Dance Release | Nominated |
| 2002 | Jolyon Watkins for Gerling "Dust Me Selecta" | Best Video | Nominated |
| 2002 | Gerling and Magoo for Gerling When Young Terrorists Chase the Sun | Producer of the Year | Nominated |
| 2003 | "Who's Ya Daddy?" | Best Dance Release | Nominated |
| 2003 | Paul Butler, Scott Walton & 50 / 50 Films for Gerling – "Who's Ya Daddy?" | Best Video | Nominated |
| 2003 | Gerling and Magoo for Gerling Bad Blood!!! | Producer of the Year | Nominated |
