= Strange Tourist =

Gareth Liddiard album

Studio album by Gareth Liddiard
- Released: October 1, 2010
- Recorded: "Winter of MMX"
- Venue: Blackburn Castle (Yass, New South Wales)
- Genre: Contemporary folk
- Length: 67:32
- Labels: Shock Records (2010); ATP Recordings (2011)
- Producers: Burke Reid; Gareth Liddiard

Strange Tourist is the debut studio album from The Drones and Tropical Fuck Storm frontman Gareth Liddiard. The album was recorded inside Blackburn Castle in New South Wales over the first half of 2010, and was produced with the help of Burke Reid. Its minimal, "austere" and "meandering" acoustic songs instrumentally consist entirely of Liddiard's guitar-playing, and are topped with his versatile and heavily-accented vocals. Exploring themes such as isolation, jealousy, guilt, colonialism, wartime collaborationism, radicalism and many others, its detailed, narrative-based lyrics have been characterized as "dark and grinding", and are set in various periods of time as well as locations.

Released through Shock Records and ATP Recordings, the album received critical acclaim from the Australian press, and (despite being scant) a very favourable critical reception outside of Australia. Its closing track "The Radicalisation of D", in particular, garnered a lot of praise and has been called the album's magnum opus. The album earned Liddiard a nomination for an ARIA Award for Best Male Artist at the 25th ARIA Music Awards, and was itself nominated for the Australian Music Prize.

== Recording ==
Strange Tourist was recorded at Blackburn Castle in New South Wales over eight weeks during the first half of 2010. According to Craig Mathieson of The Sydney Morning Herald:

Liddiard gorged on written material, spending five days taking in literature, magazine articles (including The Monthly and Soldier of Fortune), internet curiosities and the news. After that he spewed out ideas, sometimes in point form, before replacing coffee with alcohol and repeatedly rewriting and crafting the content into lyrics.

== Content ==
=== Style ===
Daniel Baker of The Quietus called the album "a deceptive subversion of rockist dogma." He describes the tracks as "sprawling venom inflected dioramas existent in their own haunted ecology." "With his first solo album," wrote Bernard Zuel of Sydney Morning Herald, "Liddiard puts aside the physical presence of the Drones, forgoing that capacity for movement as well as variation in favour of none-more-bare presentations of voice and guitar. These are in effect spoken-word pieces with minimalist backing or, given their lyricism and focus, books on tape "read" by a man whose nasally, insistent voice is never going to be mistaken for that of a choir boy." Tim Dunlop of Crikey characterized it as "dark and grinding [...] Strange Tourist consists of [...] long songs with clever lyrics documenting the political and the personal." "Liddiard's characters and their world are invoked with such eye for nuance and detail [...]" writes Zuel, "that you feel covered in the tangy sweat of fear or frozen in the same miasma of indecision and enervation as his protagonists." Liddiard's vocals have been described as a "snarling Ocka drawl [...] He sings with a half-spoken, often crowded cadence, elongating or truncating words and hinting at hidden meanings through sudden flights of possessed semi-wails. While the music remains crystalline and austere in its unhurried strums and cliff edge teetering, Liddiard's voice is capable of a more satisfying versatility". Musically, Everett True wrote that the music reminded him of Joseph Spence's "killer early Folkway [sic] Recordings" and "John Fahey's more muted work", noting also that Liddiard had been listening to Toumani Diabaté around the time that the album was made. A Sputnikmusic staff reviewer compared the "collection of stripped-back, meandering acoustic songs" to "post-Red House Painters Mark Kozelek", albeit "decidedly more abrasive and more dogmatic", with Liddiard presenting himself "as a thoughtful, meditative minstrel – offering his subjects the space they needed to go about their rituals unencumbered by a scorning, the space to make their mistakes freely (“I swear I did not know, you lay with dogs, you catch their fleas”). And on the off chance he did inject himself into the narrative, he was just as flawed as the flaw itself, just as complicit in pushing the cart past the point of no return."

=== Songs ===
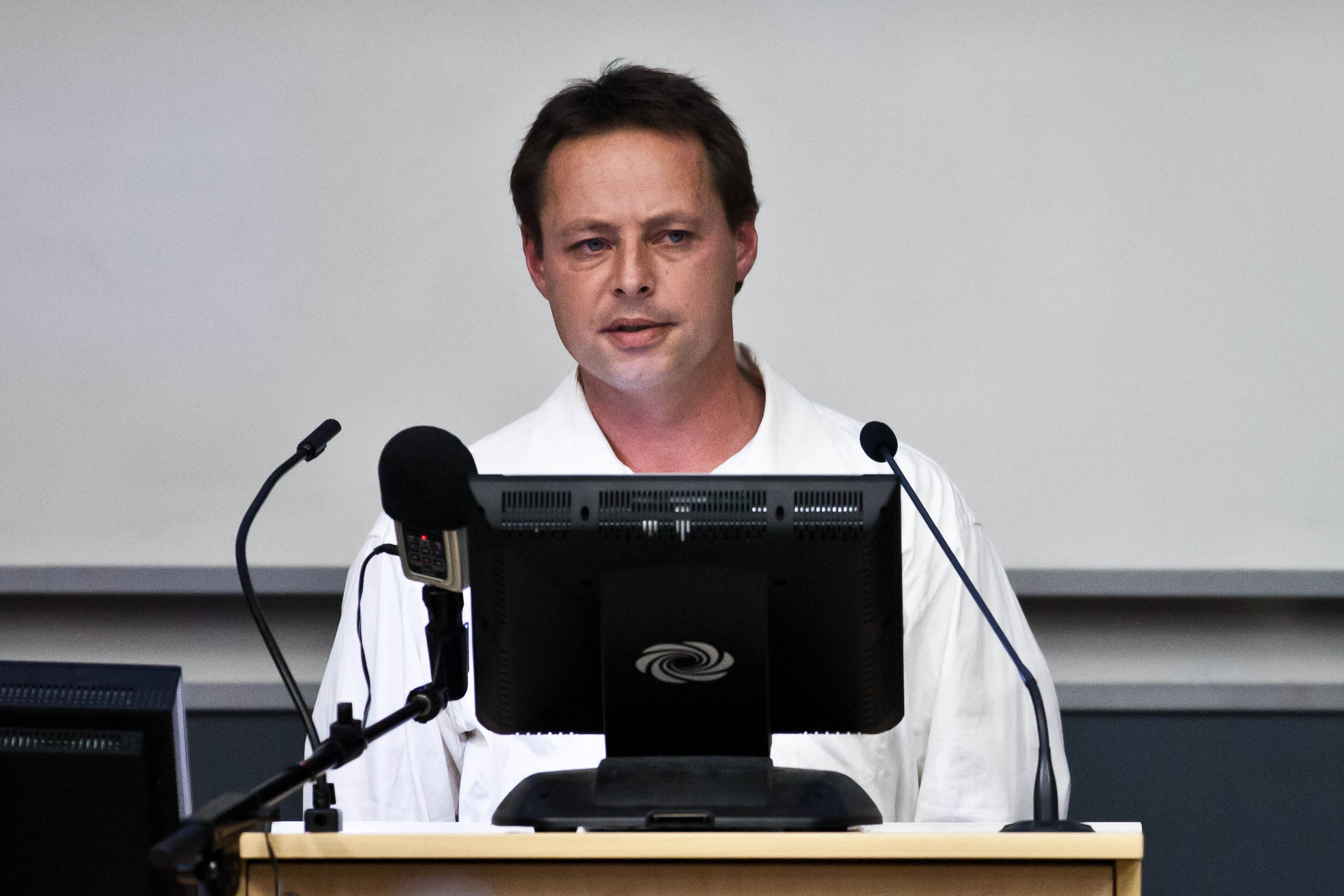
"The Radicalisation of D" is based on the life of David Hicks

The track "Blondin Makes an Omelette" is "an existential rumination on the nature of the public's adoration for Charles Blondin, [...] [w]ritten from the perspective of his faithful assistant". It has been described as "an often ambiguous interpretation of the psychology of those who gawk at risk takers [...] [j]ust enough information is withheld yet it's tenderly methodical and filled with enough pathos for it not to collapse under the weight of didacticism." Zuel notes a "carny bitterness" in the track. In an interview with Polaroids Of Androids, Liddiard stated that the song was a metaphor for colonial inferiority, where "Blondin is the colonizer and the guy complaining is the colony." "You Sure Ain't Mine Now" shows "Liddiard's voice [as being] capable of a more satisfying versatility [...] during which he delivers the refrain in a canine falsetto."

The "arresting" title track features "fizzing rough hewn picking and yearningly apocalyptic imagery" and has been singled out as being the closest to Liddiard's work with The Drones. The "75 per cent autobiographical" lyrics describe "one man's experiences with destitution, smack, war, arrest and Scientology" whilst the track itself has been described as "Stilnox-and-speed-jacked". "The Collaborator" highlights the albums "once removed, personalized microcosms of anger [...] with a brusque politicisation" where the "lurking paranoia of [a] wartime populous attempting to unearth evidence of those who aided the invaders, accusations and defensive rebuttals crowed back and forth" is "carried along by Liddiard's flinty, nasal declamations." The lyrics of the song are set in 1941 France and it "explores decidedly non-pop territory of accommodation and justification, of guilt and evasion and anger". An "epic tale of public corruption and personal obsession", "Did She Scare All Your Friends Away" is "not much less intense [...] weakness is paramount in a man who had "retired into a well of sweet vermouth", a rorting defence lawyer who's a "liberating angel with a clothes peg on his nose" or the narrator, whose explanations are rough and double-edged."

The final track, "The Radicalisation of D" is based on the life of David Hicks with several details incorporated from Liddiard's own childhood. Characterized as a bildungsroman, it has been called "a superbly engaging quarter of an hour" and "the album's magnum opus". The song "brims with a novelist's attention to character-forming minutiae, winding through a life of oppression, abuse, and social ostracisation, culminating in a damning cultural cadence as Liddiard howls over and over 'you are living in a nightmare'." "The grim horror of what is about to unfold," writes Parker, "[is] humanized implicitly by Liddiard's unhurried use of authentic Australian motifs (hills hoists, gings). It's a piece of songwriting that genuinely attempts to understand why some people become susceptible to extremism. More uncompromisingly, it suggests that they may have a point." "[T]he vast expanse of the" song's "perspective on a home-grown terrorist burns you." Manish Agarwal of Mojo finds Liddiard's "demand[s]" of "the listener's full attention" to be rewarded "most notably" on this track, which he describes as "feel[ing] all too real".

== Release ==
The album was released on CD through Shock Records in 2010, and on both CD and double LP through ATP Recordings in 2011. The latter label released the album in the UK.

=== Touring ===
Shortly after the album's release, Liddiard embarked on a solo Australian tour. The Sydney Morning Herald observed that the shows "sometimes went on until Liddiard ran out of material or the venue turned on the lights". In March the following year, he'd embarked on another 12-date national solo tour supported by Dan Kelly, and proceeded to play a few dates around Europe. According to Reverb, these performances were also very well-received, noting that most of the shows on the East coast had sold out.

=== Videos ===
Videos were made for different versions of both the title track and "Blondin Makes an Omelette", and were released on YouTube through ATP Recordings' channel.

=== Reissues ===
In 2017, Poison City Records reissued the album as a double LP. In a Reddit AMA session held by Tropical Fuck Storm in April 2020, Liddiard stated his plan to reissue the album again towards the end of the year "coz theres fuk [sic] all else to do" due to the COVID-19 pandemic.

== Reception ==
Professional ratings
Review scores
Source	Rating
Mojo	4/5 stars
Mondo Sonoro	8/10
Rolling Stone Australia	4/5 stars
Sputnikmusic	5.0/5

=== National ===
The album was acclaimed by many Australian critics. The Age, naming it their "Album of the Month", compared Liddiard to Paul Kelly and Don Walker and called the album "really exceptional". Rolling Stone Australia called the album his "bleak solo masterpiece" and compared it to a Cormac McCarthy novel in that it "lingers long after the final note has been played". Sydney Morning Herald called the album "compelling" and "[s]omething very special."

Conversely, an article by Richard Guilliatt for The Monthly criticizing the modern "troubadour" songwriter (other examples included Will Oldham, Bill Callahan and Keaton Henson) picked the reception to the album as an example of the "unseemly [,] [...] profligate doling out of four-star reviews by rock critics, who, as a breed, are notoriously susceptible to any songwriter who brings a whiff of literary cred to their disreputable world." He writes of "The Radicalisation of D": "it doesn't actually have a chorus, or a tune to speak of. In an earlier era, some porcine record exec would no doubt have demanded that Liddiard go back and write a couple of songs for FM radio. I'm beginning to miss those days."

=== International ===
The album also received very positive reviews from critics in Europe, where it was released in the UK through ATP Recordings. Mojo called the album "[s]uperlative", writing that it "reveals [...] [The Drone's] distinctively accented singer/guitarist [to be] just as potent in acoustic settings". The Quietus writes that despite the album not being "totally immersive" (citing the track "Did She Scare All Your Friends Away" as "cumbersome") and that the record "requires patience, demands concentration", the "mercurial" and "magnificent" "The Radicalisation of D" "more than justifies those efforts." Greil Marcus, writing for The Believer, called the album "over an hour's worth of a man sitting in a room, hitting notes on an acoustic guitar, meandering through tales of one defeat after another, with alcohol leaving tracks on the songs like a snail. [...] Here, in a quiet, artless, shamed, constricted way, a person emerges: a fictional construction, someone without a flicker of belief or, for that matter, interest in redemption, cure, or another life, against all odds, especially across the more than sixteen minutes of “The Radicalisation Of D,” the final track, he makes you want to know what happens next." Muzikalia called it "a unique album" that could appeal to listeners who may not be familiar with The Drones, praising Liddiard's songwriting talent & "strange" guitar-playing style.

A more mixed response came from British journalist Everett True, who reviewed the album for the Australian magazine Mess+Noise. He compared the album unfavorably to Liddiard's work with The Drones ("Australia's greatest fucking rock band living [...]") and wrote that the songs "are not Drones songs. [...] These songs are Gareth Liddiard songs." He criticized the length of the songs as being "about five minutes too long", the lack of variety in them, and whilst he praised the lyrics, he criticized the music as being "rambling, unfocused, the guitar all plucked arpeggios and breaks for reflection, but not in a meaningful way", using the track "Blondin Makes an Omelette" as an example of the latter two. Despite this, he praised "The Radicalisation of D", "which has dynamics, and power, and the odd scream, and pretty much everything else you'd expect from The Drones’ frontman", as "16 minutes of genius that gradually sucks you in until you're tightly bound to what's unfolding in front of your ears [...]".

=== Awards ===
The album earned Liddiard a nomination for an ARIA Award for Best Male Artist at the 25th ARIA Music Awards. In response to the nomination, Liddiard stated: "It's just for wankers, snorting coke and getting drunk. It's just not on my radar and I'm just not interested. The ARIAs don't really mean anything to me." The album was also nominated for the Australian Music Prize of 2010 (losing out to Bliss Release by Cloud Control), making it the fourth project involving Liddiard to have been nominated for the prize since its inception.

== Legacy ==
=== Accolades ===
In November and December 2019 respectively, Junkee included the album on two different lists: "The 25 Most Underrated Albums Of The Decade" and "The 50 Best Australian Albums Of The Decade". The entry for the former reads as follows: "A Gareth Liddiard acoustic record almost seems like a contradiction in terms — this is a man who has spent his career wielding instruments like broken bottles in a bar fight. But Strange Tourist, his singularly inspired solo record, has all the power and energy of his electric work. ‘Blondin Makes An Omlette’, a gnostic story of wire-walkers and alcoholics, might be the best thing that he's ever done."

The following year, Double J included "The Radicalisation of D" on their list "13 of the best long songs ever recorded", calling it "[c]hilling, masterful songwriting."

=== Influence ===
Artist Jason Benjamin - whose oil-on-linen portrait of Liddiard titled It’s not all Henry bloody Lawson was one of the finalists for the 2011 Archibald Prize - praised the album as being "fantastic" & claimed that he'd listened to it "over and over" on his way down to Liddiard's home in Havilah, New South Wales to make the painting.

Rob Snarski (lead guitarist/vocalist and founding member of The Blackeyed Susans and Chad's Tree) cited the album as an inspiration on his solo album Sparrow And Swan, commenting that "[h]e really lifted the bar on songwriting for Australian singer-songwriters."

In an interview with Short List, British actor George MacKay stated that both the album and Liddiard himself were a big inspiration for his titular role in the 2019 film True History of the Kelly Gang "in terms of voice and look". “He did this one solo album called ‘Strange Tourist’" he continued, "which is him and an acoustic guitar and there's these kinds of noodling poems of songs. His way of talking is very easy, very cool, but he sits back. That's what we wanted with this version of Ned. He has quite a bit of power in being unreadable, it's a kind of defence [sic] mechanism, that thing of, ‘You're not gonna know what I'm thinking’ and that should make you feel funny.”

Griffin Award-winning playwright Mark Rogers named "The Radicalisation of D" as an influence on his play Superheroes and admitted that "a lot of the construction of Superheroes was me picking out bits from that song."

== Track listing ==
All tracks are written by Gareth Liddiard.

No.	Title	Length
1.	"Blondin Makes an Omelette"	4:52
2.	"Highplains Mailman"	8:22
3.	"Strange Tourist"	7:24
4.	"You Sure Ain't Mine Now"	9:24
5.	"The Collaborator"	4:59
6.	"Did She Scare All Your Friends Away"	9:48
7.	"She's My Favourite"	6:31
8.	"The Radicalisation of D"	16:12
Total length:		67:32

== Personnel ==
- Gareth Liddiard – vocals, acoustic guitar, composition

=== Additional credits ===
Adapted from liner notes:

- Amy Burrows - design
- Ross Cockle - mastering
- Daniel Campbell - photography (cover)
- Burke Reid - recording, photography (interior)
