= For the Birds (The Mess Hall album) =

Studio album by The Mess Hall
- Released: 13 November 2009
- Genre: Indie rock
- Producer: Burke Reid

The Mess Hall chronology
Devils Elbow (2007)	For the Birds (2009)

Professional ratings
Review scores
Source	Rating
Herald Sun	4/5 stars
Triple J	(Positive)
Web Wombat	3/5 stars

For the Birds is the fourth album from The Mess Hall and was released on 11 November 2009. It peaked at No. 2 on the ARIA Hitseekers Albums Chart.

== Track listing ==
1. "My Villain"
2. "Bell"
3. "Tijuana 500"
4. "Bare"
5. "Marlene"
6. "Silhouettes"
7. "New Ornithology"
8. "The Switch"
9. "Long Time Death"
10. "Swing Low"

== Personnel ==
- Jed Kurzel – vocals, guitar
- Cec Condon – drums, vocals
