= Olympia (musician) =

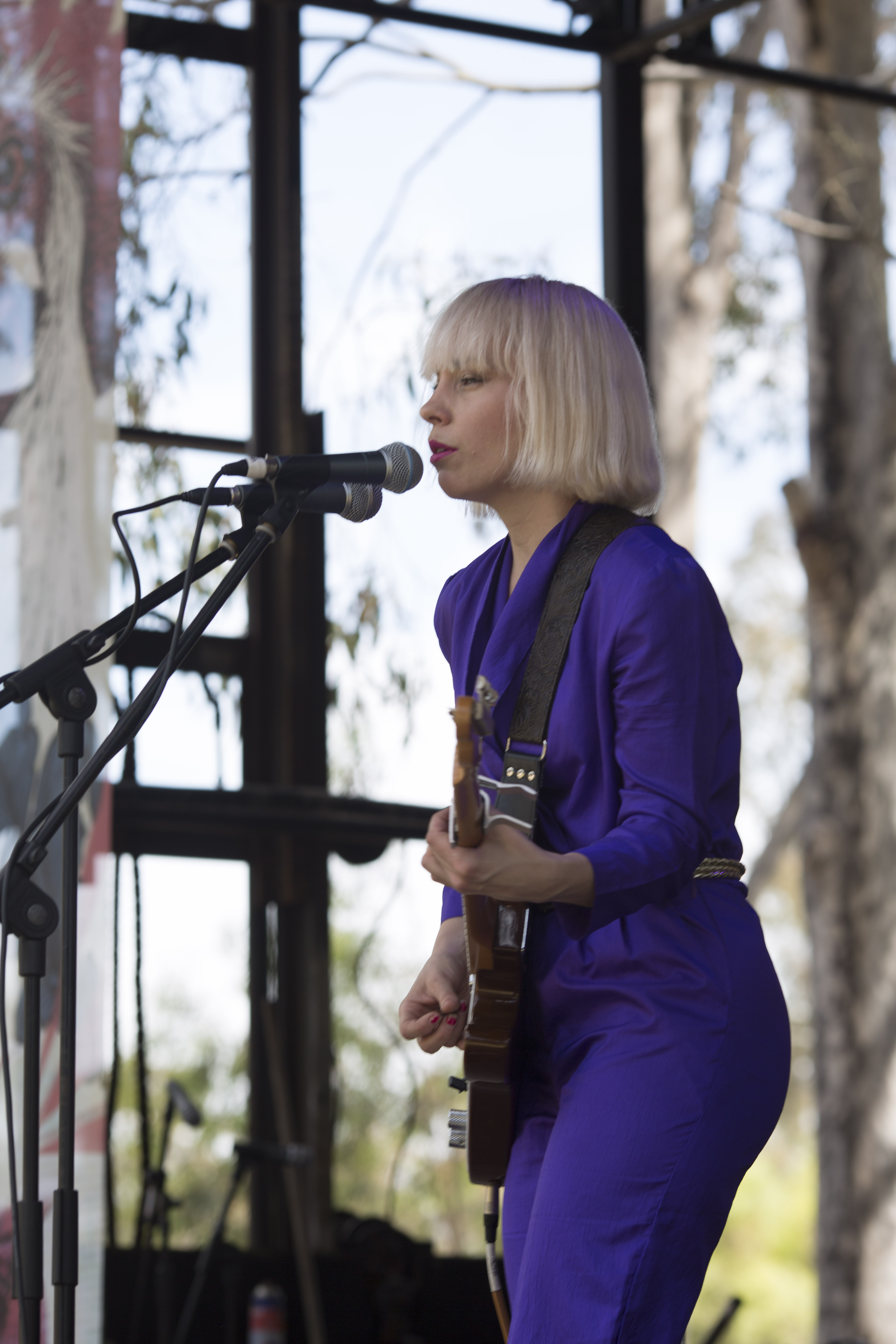
- Olympia in 2015

Background information
- Born: Olivia Jayne Bartley; 1982 (age 43–44); Wollongong, New South Wales, Australia
- Origin: Melbourne, Victoria, Australia
- Genres: Rock, pop, alternative
- Occupation: Musician
- Instruments: Voice; guitar; piano; percussion
- Years active: 2013–present
- Labels: EMI Music, Universal Music Australia

Olivia Jayne Bartley (born 1982, Wollongong), who also performs as Olympia, is an Australian art-pop singer-songwriter-guitarist. She released her debut studio album Self Talk in April 2016 which received an ARIA Award nomination at the ARIA Music Awards of 2016.

== Career ==
=== 2013–2017: Career beginnings and Self Talk ===
In March 2013, Olympia released her self-titled, self-released debut extended play, which included her debut single "Atlantis".

In February 2015, Olympia released "Honey", the lead single from her forthcoming debut studio album. This was followed by "This Is Why We Can't Have Nice Things" and "Tourists". In March 2016, Olympia announced the release of her debut studio album Self Talk in April, alongside the single "Smoke Signals". Self Talk peaked at No. 26 on the ARIA Albums Chart. She was nominated for Breakthrough Artist at the ARIA Music Awards of 2016., and for the Australian Music Prize. Self Talk was co-produced by Burke Reid, with music videos directed by Alexander Smith. It was also the feature album on Triple J.

Olympia's 2016 performance at the Northcote Social Club was listed as the best live show of the year by Michael Dwyer of The Age. She was nominated for a gig at the National Live Music Awards in 2017. Olympia has appeared at the Falls Festival, The Great Escape Festival (United Kingdom), Sound City (UK) and Golden Plains Festival. Olivia Bartley has played lead guitar and vocals in Paul Dempsey's band.

=== 2018–2019: Flamingo ===
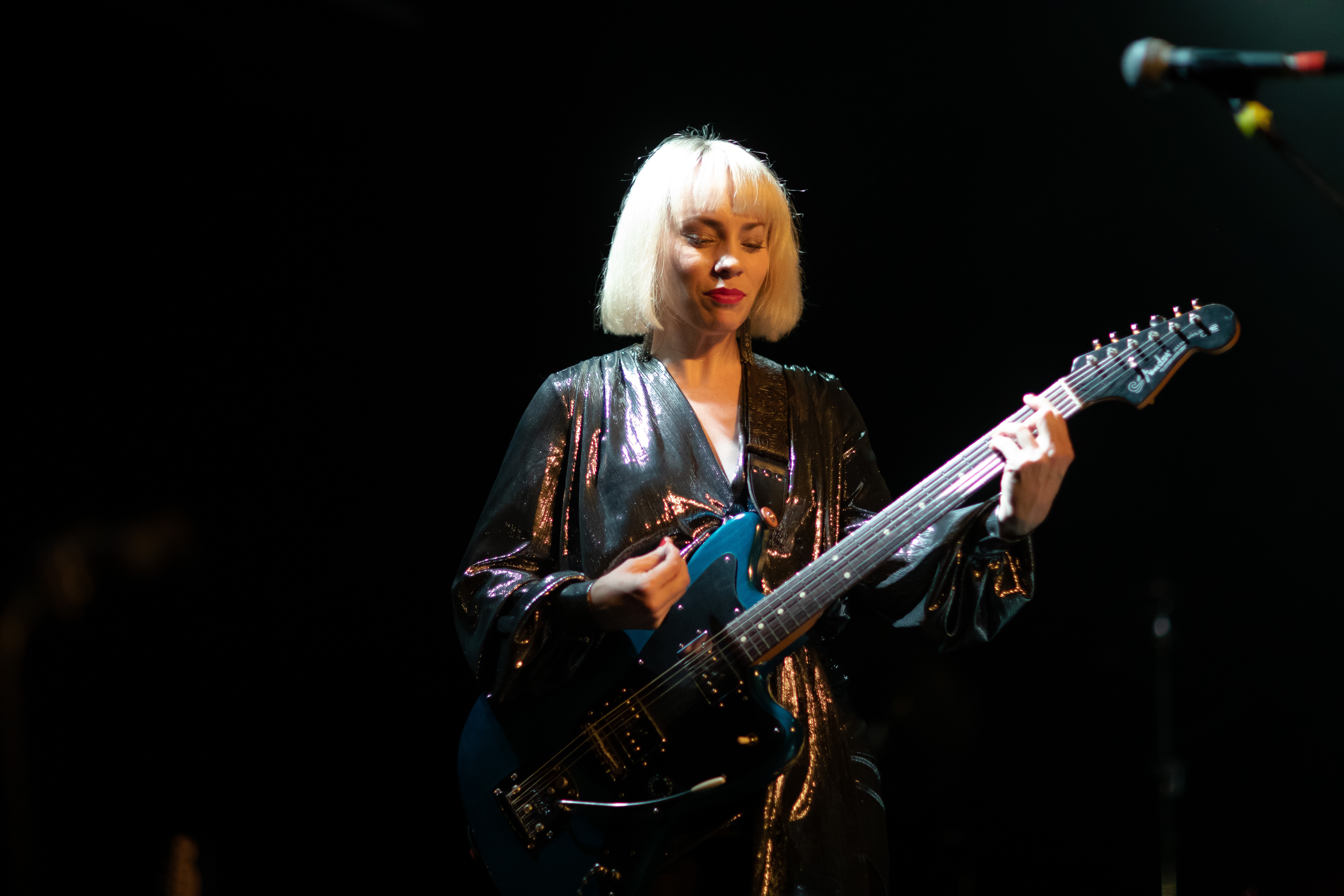
Olympia in 2019

In August 2018, Olympia released "Star City", the lead single from her forthcoming second studio album, due in 2019. She promoted the single with an Australian tour.

In February 2019, "Shoot to Forget" was released as the second single. In May 2019, Olympia announced her second studio album would be titled Flamingo and is due for release on 5 July 2019.

=== 2023: RocKwiz ===
In 2023, Olympia joined the RocKwiz Orkestra for the filming of Series 15 TV reboot for Foxtel, having performed on the show in Series 12 and 14. Following filming Olympia continues to play in the 'Orkestra' during the shows national tours.

=== 2024: "Try Be Good" ===
In 2024, Olympia formed the record label Reach Around Records and on 9 February 2024, released her first new single in 5 years, "Try Be Good".

== Discography ==
=== Albums ===
List of extended plays, with selected chart positions
Title	Album details	Peak chart positions
Title	Album details	AUS
Self Talk	Released: 29 April 2016; Label: EMI Music / Universal Music Australia (4781766); Formats: CD, digital download, Vinyl	26
Flamingo	Released: 5 July 2019; Label: EMI, Universal Music Australia; Formats: CD, digital download, streaming	100

=== EPs ===
List of extended plays, with selected chart positions
Title	EP details
Olympia	Released: 20 March 2013; Label: Olympia; Formats: CD, digital download
Love For One	Released: 17 May 2024; Label: Olympia; Formats: digital download

=== Singles ===
Year	Title	Album
2013	"Atlantis"	Olympia
2015	"Honey"	Self Talk
2015	"This Is Why We Can't Have Nice Things"	Self Talk
2015	"Tourists"	Self Talk
2016	"Smoke Signals"	Self Talk
2016	"Somewhere to Disappear"	Self Talk
2018	"Star City"	Flamingo
2019	"Shoot to Forget"	Flamingo
2019	"Hounds"	Flamingo
2024	"Try Be Good"	Love For One

== Awards and nominations ==
=== ARIA Music Awards ===
The ARIA Music Awards is an annual awards ceremony that recognises excellence, innovation, and achievement across all genres of Australian music.

Year	Nominee / work	Award	Result
2016	Self Talk	Breakthrough Artist	Nominated

=== Australian Music Prize ===
The Australian Music Prize is an annual award given to an Australian band or solo artist in recognition of the merit of an album released during the year of award.

Year	Nominee / work	Award	Result
2016	Self Talk	Australian Music Prize	Nominated

=== J Awards ===
The J Awards are an annual series of Australian music awards that were established by the Australian Broadcasting Corporation's youth-focused radio station Triple J. They commenced in 2005.

Year	Nominee / work	Award	Result
2016	"Smoke Signals"	Australian Video of the Year	Nominated

=== Music Victoria Awards ===
The Music Victoria Awards are an annual awards night celebrating Victorian music. They commenced in 2006.

Year	Nominee / work	Award	Result	Ref.
2019	Olympia	Best Solo Artist	Nominated	
