= Bloody Lovely =

Studio album by DZ Deathrays
- Released: 2 February 2018
- Studio: Sydney, Australia
- Genre: Dance-punk, post-punk revival, alternative rock
- Length: 37:08
- Label: I Oh You (AUS)
- Producer: Burke Reid

DZ Deathrays chronology
Black Rat (2014)	Bloody Lovely (2018)	Positive Rising: Vol. 1 (2019)

Singles from Bloody Lovely
- 1. "Shred for Summer" Released: 2 August 2017; 2. "Bad Influence" Released: 23 September 2017; 3. "Total Meltdown" Released: 1 November 2017; 4. "Like People" Released: 5 February 2018

Bloody Lovely is the third studio album by Australian dance-punk band DZ Deathrays. It was released on I Oh You Records in February 2018. Australian radio station Triple J picked Bloody Lovely as their feature album of the week in February 2018. The music video for "Like People" featured one of the original members of The Wiggles, Murray Cook. It was nominated at the 2018 ARIA Music Awards for Best Hard Rock/Heavy Metal Album but lost to Parkway Drive for Reverence.

== Reception ==
Professional ratings
Aggregate scores
Source	Rating
Metacritic	63/100
Review scores
Source	Rating
AllMusic	3.5/5 stars
TheMusic	4/5 stars

The album was met with generally favourable reviews. On Metacritic, which assigns a normalised rating out of 100 to reviews from critics, the album has an average score of 63 based on 5 reviews. The lead single "Shred for Summer" placed within Triple J's Hottest 100, 2017 at no. 67 while the single "Total Meltdown" just missed out placing no. 109 within the Hottest 200 of 2017. On 18 February, the album peaked at No. 4 on the ARIA Charts and remained there for a total of two weeks.

== Track listing ==
All music is composed by DZ Deathrays (Shane Parsons, Simon Ridley), except where noted

No.	Title	Writer(s)	Length
1.	"Shred for Summer"		4:00
2.	"Total Meltdown"		3:05
3.	"Feeling Good, Feeling Great"		3:19
4.	"Like People"		4:02
5.	"High"		3:25
6.	"Guillotine"		2:11
7.	"Bad Influence"		1:11
8.	"Over It"	Parsons; Ridley; David Novak	3:30
9.	"Back & Forth"		3:18
10.	"Afterglow"		3:31
11.	"Witchcraft Pt. II"		5:36
Total length:			37:08

== Personnel ==
=== DZ Deathrays ===
- Shane Parsons – lead vocals, guitars
- Simon Ridley – drums, percussion

=== Production ===
- Burke Reid – producer
- Simon Ridley – programming

== Charts ==
Chart (2018)	Peak position
Australian Albums (ARIA)	4
