= Matt Lovell =

- Origin: Newcastle, New South Wales, Australia
- Occupations: Audio engineer, brewer, Co-Restaurant Owner
- Years active: 1994–present

Matt Lovell is an Australian audio engineer, record producer and mixer. He has won three ARIA Music Awards for Engineer of the Year: in 2005 for his work on The Mess Hall's' Notes from a Ceiling, in 2006 for Black Fingernails, Red Wine by Eskimo Joe, and in 2008 for his work on Shihad's Beautiful Machine. Lovell was the CEO and co-owner of Lovell's Lager, a brewery.

== Biography ==
Matt Lovell worked as an assistant audio engineer on silverchair's debut album, Frogstomp, from December 1994, which was released in March of the following year. He has produced work for Something for Kate, The Mess Hall, Tom Morgan and Shihad. As well as producing, he has also worked with Ammonia, Midnight Oil, Eskimo Joe, Grinspoon, Silverchair, the Whitlams, INXS, Spiderbait, the Presets, One Dollar Short, the Sleepy Jackson, and Cold Chisel.

Lovell has received three ARIA Music Awards for Engineer of the Year: in 2005 for his work on The Mess Hall's' Notes from a Ceiling, in 2006 for Black Fingernails, Red Wine by Eskimo Joe, and in 2008 for his work on Shihad's Beautiful Machine. In 2011 he was nominated for Engineer of the Year for his work on Eskimo Joe's Ghosts of the Past. He has worked with other record producers: Andrew Farriss, Tony Cohen, Kevin Shirley and Nick Launay.

In 2006 Lovell was appointed as a mentor in the Qantas 'Spirit of Youth Awards'. Lovell has mixed Jed Kurzel's soundtrack for the 2011 feature film, Snowtown.

Outside of his music career, Lovell was the founder and CEO of Lovell's Lager a beer brewery based in Sydney since 2005. Roger Grierson (of The Thought Criminals) recommended it, "It's on tap at the Annandale. Excellent. If you're at the Annandale, buy some." Back of the Ferry's website reviewer described the beer "there is something just not right with this beer (to my taste). The first swallow is inoffensive, but there is an aftertaste that is reminiscent of stale beer lines that I couldn’t get over. It really was a struggle to get the last drop down." Chris Joannou of Silverchair became his partner in the brewery, but by February 2014 the business was "currently on hold." Lovell now co-owns and operates a Korean Fried Chicken restaurant, in Newcastle, Australia. The restaurant, named Wu-cha, is owned by Paula Birch, Lovell and Harry Callinan. According to Lovell “It’s all about the really punchy flavours and bright colours” with the chicken being cooked fresh and the sauces made from scratch.

== See also ==
- List of record producers
