= The Mess Hall =

Australian band

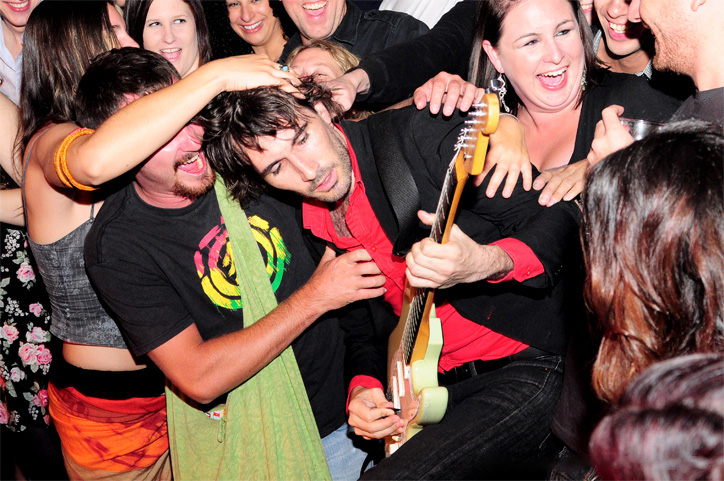

Background information
- Origin: Sydney, New South Wales, Australia
- Genres: Blues rock, indie rock, garage rock
- Years active: 2001–2011, 2015
- Labels: Shock Records; Ivy League Records
- Past members: Jed Kurzel; Cec Condon; Anthony Johnsen; Justin Kurzel
- Website: Official website

The Mess Hall were a two-piece drums and guitar combo based in Sydney, Australia, specialising in "raw, edgy bluesy rock." The band consisted of Jed Kurzel (lead vocals/guitar) and Cec Condon (drums/backing vocals) for most of its tenure. The band was often praised for its live shows: "When plugged in and turned up," wrote The Sydney Morning Herald, "the duo produce enough energy to power a house full of floodlights." The band released four studio albums before amicably parting in 2011. They reunited for a series of shows in 2015.

== History ==
=== 2001-2004: Early days ===
The Mess Hall originally formed as a trio: Jed Kurzel on lead vocals and guitar, his brother Justin on bass, and Anthony "AJ" Johnsen on drums and backing vocals. After Justin's departure a few months after forming, Jed Kurzel and Anthony Johnsen began playing shows as a duo in 2001. They quickly gained a reputation as a live act. They also recorded their self-titled lo-fi album, to distribute at live events. In 2003, the band signed with Shock Records and released the EP, Feeling Sideways. Produced by Matt Lovell (Something for Kate) and Chris Joannou (Silverchair), the short album earned an ARIA nomination for Best Independent Release. In early 2004, Johnsen left the band and was replaced by drummer Cec Condon of The Tremors and Mexico City.

=== 2005-2006 :Notes from a Ceiling ===
In 2005, The Mess Hall released their second studio album, Notes From A Ceiling. Jed Kurzel said the only recollection he has of recording the album is that Cec Condon nearly set fire to the studio whilst barbecuing, and that while he was suffering vertigo, the attending doctor was more interested in whether the band were touring on the next Big Day Out than attending to his illness.

=== 2007-2011: Devil's Elbow, For the Birds and hiatus ===
During September 2007, The Mess Hall signed to Ivy League Records and released their third album, Devils Elbow. Soon after its release, the album won the Australian Music Prize, gifting the band $25,000 in prize money. As their momentum started, the Mess Hall also won the support slot for the Foo Fighters' Australian tour.

The Mess Hall released their fourth and final album, For the Birds, on 13 November 2009 in Australia. The first single released from the album was "Bell". Kurzel and Condon last performed together in 2011, as members of Noah Taylor & The Sloppy Boys. Condon joined The Cops, while Kurzel focused on film scoring full-time.

=== 2015: reunion ===
The band returned to playing shows in 2015. The band performed on New Year's Day at Sydney's Vic on the Park and at Wollongong's Farmer & The Owl Festival before returning to inactivity.

== Tours ==
The band have played on the same bill as Tenacious D, You Am I, the Jon Spencer Blues Explosion, The Strokes, Kings of Leon and Jet as well as playing at the Splendour in the Grass, Homebake, Falls and Big Day Out festivals. They have toured to Japan and the USA, including performances at SXSW in Austin. The band has such covers on their live set list such as Nirvana's "Breed" and Mudhoney's "Touch Me I'm Sick". They also supported fellow Aussie rockers Wolfmother on several dates of their 2005 Dimensions tour.

== Discography ==
=== Albums ===
| Title | Album details |
|---|---|
| The Mess Hall | Released: 2001; Label: The Mess Hall; Format: CD |
| Notes from a Ceiling | Released: June 2005; Label: Cayman Island Mafia Records (CIM0105); Format: CD, Digital |
| Devils Elbow | Released: October 2007; Label: Ivy League Records (IVY057); Format: CD, Digital |
| For the Birds | Released: November 2009; Label: Ivy League Records (IVY085); Format: CD, Digital |

=== Extended Plays ===
| Title | Album details |
|---|---|
| Feeling Sideways | Released: May 2003; Label: Cayman Island Mafia Records (CIM0103); Format: CD |

=== Singles ===
| Title | Year | Album |
|---|---|---|
| "Evelyn | 2005 | non album single |
| "Pills" | 2005 | Notes from a Ceiling |
| "Metal and Hair" | 2005 | Notes from a Ceiling |
| "Keep Walking" | 2007 | Devils Elbow |
| "Pulse" | 2007 | Devils Elbow |
| "Bell" | 2009 | For the Birds |

== Awards and nominations ==
=== ARIA Music Awards ===
The ARIA Music Awards are a set of annual ceremonies presented by Australian Recording Industry Association (ARIA), which recognise excellence, innovation, and achievement across all genres of the music of Australia. They commenced in 1987.

| Year | Nominee / work | Award | Result | Ref. |
|---|---|---|---|---|
| 2003 | Feeling Sideways | Best Independent Release | Nominated | |
| 2005 | Matt Lovell for Notes from a Ceiling | Engineer of the Year | Won | |
| 2005 | Chris Joannou & The Mess Hall for Notes from a Ceiling | Producer of the Year | Nominated | |

=== Australian Music Prize ===
The Australian Music Prize (the AMP) is an annual award of $30,000 given to an Australian band or solo artist in recognition of the merit of an album released during the year of award. They commenced in 2005.

| Year | Nominee / work | Award | Result | Ref. |
|---|---|---|---|---|
| 2005 | Notes from a Ceiling | Australian Music Prize | Nominated | |
| 2007 | Devils Elbow | Australian Music Prize | Won | |
| 2009 | For the Birds | Australian Music Prize | Nominated | |

=== Jack Awards ===
- 2006 Jack Awards, Best Live Band
- 2006 Jack Awards, Best Lead Guitarist - Jed Kurzel
