= The Mess Hall (album) =

Studio album by The Mess Hall
- Released: 2001
- Recorded: 2001
- Genre: Indie rock
- Length: ?
- Label: Shock Records
- Producer: ?

The Mess Hall chronology
The Mess Hall (2001)	Feeling Sideways EP (2003)

The Mess Hall released in 2001, is the first full-length album from the Australian rock band, the Mess Hall. The band's self-titled, lo-fi debut album was described as, "....the perfect soundtrack to trashing a hotel room".

== Track listing ==
1. "Dead Field Stomp"
2. "Railyard Rumble"
3. "Danny Blue-Tongue Blues"
4. "Air"
5. "Hit Like That in the Ring"
6. "Hell Is Just A Bar"
7. "Hollerin' Love"
8. "Highway Like A Trail"
9. "I Feel Like A Dog"
10. "Medley"
