= Jep and Dep =

Australian musical duo

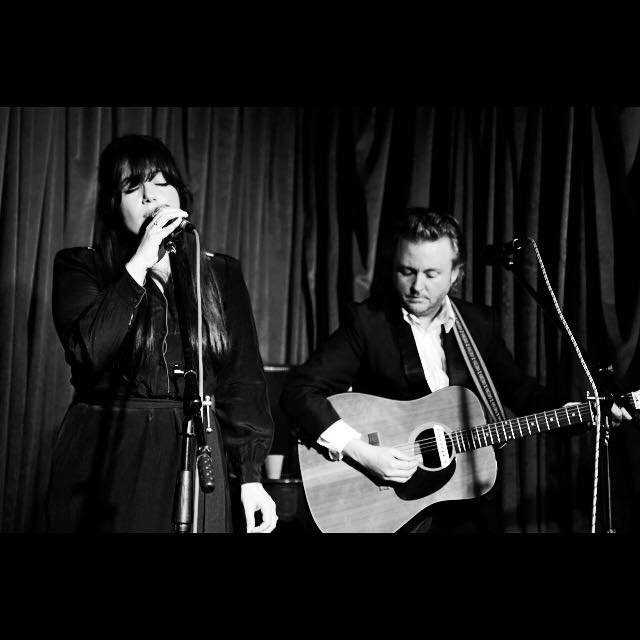
- Jep and Dep supporting Johnny Marr from the Smiths, Oxford Art Factory 15 January 2014

Background information
- Origin: Sydney, Australia
- Genre: Folk
- Years active: 2012–present
- Members: Jessica Cassar; Darren Cross
- Website: jepanddep.com

Jep and Dep are an Australian folk noir acoustic duo from Sydney, composed of Jessica Cassar and Darren Cross.

Formed in 2012, the duo have released one EP Through The Night (2012), and two albums Word Got Out (2014), receiving 4 out of 5 reviews from The Sydney Morning Herald and Rolling Stone and THEY'VEBEENCALLED (2017). Their music is often compared to Lee Hazlewood / Nancy Sinatra and Nick Cave and Kylie Minogue on Murder Ballads.

== History ==
Initially starting out as an antifolk band the duo quickly fell into the traditional folk music genre, flirting with equal parts alt-country to equal part ethereal folk. Their sound is characterised by Cassar's beautiful torch singer vocal style, coupled with Cross's weary, Johnny Cash-esque gravely vocal tone. Songs are performed live with just an acoustic guitar that Cross plays – reminiscent of Neil Young Live at Massey Hall. The band adopt a Film Noir look- all videos and photos are in black and white. They have also been invited to and perform with musicians such as Johnny Marr from The Smiths, Gruff Rhys from Super Furry Animals, Kristin Hersh from Throwing Muses, Lindi Ortega, Deertick, Mia Dyson, Jen Cloher with Courtney Barnett and recently Mirel Wagner in Helsinki, Finland, Aldous Harding, Jessica Pratt, the Black Eyed Susan's, Hugo Race and Low.

== Word Got Out ==
Jep and Dep's debut album Word Got Out was independently released by the duo to critical acclaim in late October 2014, receiving 4 out of 5 reviews in both Rolling Stone and The Sydney Morning Herald "Come on like folk-noir variations on Nick Cave and Kylie Minogue's classic Where the Wild Roses Grow, ballads with the right balance of creeping menace and painful regret".

The album was recorded minimally - a nod to 1960s folk recording techniques - at Damien Gerards studios in Sydney by Peter Holz, then produced by Darren Cross at Bernstein Studios for five months.

== they'vebeencalled ==
In August 2017, Jep and Dep released their second album THEY'VEBEENCALLED on their own No Drums Records, to critical acclaim. Rolling Stone said "Channelling Tom Waits, Scott Walker and Serge Gainsbourg and THEY’VEBEENCALLED is supremely atmospheric, and revels in the shadows". The album's main themes deal with the all encompassing gentrification of the modern world- specifically Sydney and Berlin, unrequited love and the passing of loved ones. The album was recorded and produced by Darren Cross between the hours of 12 am and 5 am as next to his studio there were ongoing renovations happening, giving the album an overall eerie atmosphere. The duo have boycotted popular streaming services as it "devaluates their music". The album is only available on the bandcamp platform.

Cassar issued her debut solo album, The Space Between, in 2020, which was recorded with Cross at his home studio, Bernstein Studios from March to August in that year. Rolling Stone Australia's Tyler Jenke declared, "[she] uses her ethereal voice to create something not only unique, but versatile, with the otherworldly nature of her stunning vocals at times turning the record that feels wholly instrumental, before her poetic lyrics again come into focus and work their magic."

== Discography ==
=== Albums ===
- THEY'VEBEENCALLED (2017)
- Word Got Out (2014)

=== EPs ===
- Through The Night (2012)

=== Singles ===
- "Helpless City" (2017)
- "Cruel Moon" (2017)
- "My Berlin" (2016)
- "Tears in the Rain" (2015)
- "Babe Come Down" (2014)
- "Granted" (2014)
- "Confide in Me" (2013)
- "Ain't Coming Back" (2012)
- "The Fall of the Leaves Never Cease" (2012)
