= Devils Elbow =

Studio album by The Mess Hall
- Released: 27 October 2007
- Recorded: Big Jesus Burger Studios
- Genre: Indie rock
- Label: Ivy League Records
- Producer: Burke Reid

The Mess Hall chronology
Notes from a Ceiling (2005)	Devils Elbow (2007)	For the Birds (2009)

Devils Elbow is the third album from The Mess Hall and was released on 27 October 2007. It peaked at No. 2 on the ARIA Hitseekers Albums Chart. It provided a single, "Keep Walking", earlier in the same month. The album won the Australian Music Prize in 2007, an annual award for album of the year, as well as $25,000 prize money.

Professional ratings
Review scores
Source	Rating
Time Off	3.5/5 stars

== Track listing ==
1. "Keep Walking" – 3:39
2. "Pulse" – 4:33
3. "City of Roses" – 3:50
4. "Load Left" – 4:16
5. "Lorelei" – 3:18
6. "Cookie" – 5:15
7. "Part 1" – 4:31
8. "Betty" – 4:19
9. "Buddy" – 4:11
10. "Be Not A Man" 4:04

== Personnel ==
- Jed Kurzel – vocals, guitar
- Cec Condon – drums, vocals
