= When Young Terrorists Chase the Sun =

Studio album by Gerling
- Released: September 2001
- Genre: Experimental rock
- Length: 58:14

Gerling chronology
Children of Telepathic Experiences (1998)	When Young Terrorists Chase the Sun (2001)	Bad Blood!!! (2003)

Singles from When Young Terrorists Chase the Sun
- 1. "The Deer in You" Released: 2000; 2. "Dust Me Selecta" Released: 2001; 3. "Hot Computer" Released: 2001

Professional ratings
Review scores
Source	Rating
Drowned in Sound	8/10 link

When Young Terrorists Chase the Sun is the second studio album by Gerling, released in September 2001. Originally due to be released on 16 September, it was delayed due to the September 11 attacks and renamed in the UK and Japan under the title Headzcleaner. The album peaked at number 41 in Australia.

Cross later said, "with WYTCTS we didn't really care about how we were going to do it live, it was more this album of all these different songs that fit into each other and I think that was a really ambitious record, we don't regret anything about it."

At the ARIA Music Awards of 2002, Gerling and Magoo were nominated for Producer of the Year for their work on this album.

== Track listing ==
1. "Phazer Kidz in the Windy City" – 4:40
2. "Dust Me Selecta" (featuring Inga Liljeström) – 4:13
3. "High Jackers Manual" – 3:46
4. "G-House Project" (featuring Kylie Minogue) – 5:04
5. "Fight Revolution Team" – 4:13
6. "Brother Keith on Destructor Mountain (4001)" (featuring Kool Keith) – 3:44
7. "Deka" – 3:23
8. "Hot Computer" – 4:01
9. "Serpentheadz" – 4:23
10. "The Deer in You" – 4:04
11. "Windmills and Birdbaths (Intro)" – 0:42
12. "Windmills and Birdbaths" (featuring Solex) – 4:42
13. "Summer Lake Rewind" – 2:48
14. "We Design the Future" – 8:31

== Charts ==
Chart (2001–02)	Peak position
Australian Albums (ARIA)	41
New Zealand Albums (RMNZ)	50
