= Children of Telepathic Experiences =

Studio album by Gerling
- Released: 1998
- Recorded: Charing Cross Studios, Sydney, Australia
- Genre: Experimental rock
- Length: 49:37
- Label: Reliant Records
- Producer: Steve Foster and Gerling

Gerling chronology
A Day of Research (1996)	Children of Telepathic Experiences (1998)	When Young Terrorists Chase the Sun (2001)

Singles from Album
- 1. "Bachelor Pad" Released: 1998; 2. "Death to the Apple Gerls" Released: 1998; 3. "Ghost Patrol" Released: 1999; 4. "Enter, Space Capsule" Released: 1999; 5. "Children of Telepathic Experiences" Released: 2000 (UK only); 6. "Suburban Jungle Sleeping Bag" Released: 2000 (UK only); 7. "The Deer in You" Released: 2000

Professional ratings
Review scores
Source	Rating
NME	7/10

Children of Telepathic Experiences is the debut album by the Australian band Gerling. The album was released in 1998 on Reliant, a now-defunct imprint of Festival Mushroom Records.

At the ARIA Music Awards of 1999, the album was nominated for Best Adult Alternative Album and Breakthrough Artist - Album.

== Production ==
The record was co-produced by the band, in collaboration with Steve Foster, who would also work with the band on its next album.

== Track listing ==
No.	Title	Length
1.	"The Last Traveller"	3:07
2.	"Death to the Apple Gerls"	3:35
3.	"Enter, Space Capsule"	3:29
4.	"Destructor 4000"	2:36
5.	"Ghost Control"	3:39
6.	"Suburban Jungle Sleeping Bag"	3:25
7.	"Meet You @ Karate"	3:03
8.	"Crafted Werked"	2:55
9.	"I Heard an Echo of a Cobra's Bite"	4:58
10.	"Art School Canyon"	3:36
11.	"√Genius Fight"	2:46
12.	"Bachelor Pad, Pt. 1"	2:59
13.	"Bachelor Pad, Pt. 2"	4:23
14.	"Linsky"	0:59
15.	"A Student Eating Sushi with a Chimp on a Glass Island"	4:07

Bonus track
No.	Title	Length
16.	"Enter, Space Capsule" (Radio Disko Remix)	3:17
