= Bad Blood (Gerling album) =

Bad Blood!!!

Studio album by Gerling
- Released: August 2003
- Genre: Dance/Electronica
- Length: 37:22

Gerling chronology
When Young Terrorists Chase the Sun (2001)	Bad Blood!!! (2003)	4 (2006)

Bad Blood is an album by Gerling, released in August 2003. The album peaked at number 57 on the ARIA Charts.

Cross said, "This time we just wanted to do something that we could do live, so I just decided to sing a lot more. I think when we play it live now, it sounds even rawer than the album. With this album we wanted to go back to our roots and just get how we are live as a balance on the CD."

At the ARIA Music Awards of 2003, Gerling and Magoo were nominated for Producer of the Year.

== Track listing ==
1. "Blood on the Microphone, Pt. 1" – 4:04
2. "Blood on the Microphone, Pt. 2" – 0:40
3. "Get Activated" – 2:46
4. "In the City" – 4:13
5. "Bad Blood!!!" – 3:52
6. "Wacked Light" – 2:59
7. "Newwave Machine" – 4:25
8. "Smash the Emergency Glass" – 4:29
9. "We Got Venom" – 6:09
10. "Who's Ya Daddy?" – 3:45

== Charts ==
Chart (2003)	Peak position
Australian Albums (ARIA)	57
