= 4 (Gerling album) =

Studio album by Gerling
- Released: March 2006
- Genre: Alternative rock
- Length: 43:59
- Label: Festival Mushroom Records
- Producer: Ethan Johns

Gerling chronology
Bad Blood!!! (2003)	4 (2006)

4 is the fourth and final studio album by Gerling, produced by Ethan Johns in Hollywood, California, United States, released in March 2006. The album peaked at number 78 on the ARIA charts.

== Track listing ==
No.	Title	Length
1.	"Good Timing"	4:18
2.	"Turning the Screws"	3:47
3.	"Gator"	3:40
4.	"Auf Wiedersehn"	3:38
5.	"When the Night Comes?"	3:36
6.	"Big Game"	3:50
7.	"I'm Doing OK"	3:24
8.	"Spanish Sea"	3:01
9.	"Getaway Car"	3:03
10.	"Soiree"	3:17
11.	"Back on the Freeway"	3:08
12.	"Money (Space Jam)"	5:17

== Charts ==
Chart (2006)	Peak position
Australian Albums (ARIA)	78
