= A Laughing Death in Meatspace =

Studio album by Tropical Fuck Storm
- Released: 4 May 2018
- Recorded: 2017–2018
- Studios: Dodgy Brothers Studio (Nagambie, Victoria)
- Genres: Punk blues; art punk; glam rock; noise rock; psychedelic rock; garage rock; post-punk
- Length: 47:18
- Labels: Tropical Fuck Storm; Mistletone; Joyful Noise

Tropical Fuck Storm chronology
A Laughing Death in Meatspace (2018)	Braindrops (2019)

Singles from A Laughing Death in Meatspace
- 1. "Chameleon Paint" Released: 22 September 2017; 2. "Soft Power" Released: 17 November 2017; 3. "You Let My Tyres Down" Released: 30 January 2018; 4. "Rubber Bullies" Released: 11 April 2018

A Laughing Death in Meatspace is the debut album of Melbourne-based supergroup Tropical Fuck Storm, formed by members of The Drones, Palm Springs and High Tension. The band, wishing to step away from the more rock-centric sound that The Drones were known for prior to their final pre-hiatus album Feelin Kinda Free, utilized a range of obscure digital guitar effects, synthesizers, drum machines, and DAW software such as ProTools to create the music. Finished less than eight months after their first few live performances, the speed at which the album was recorded also had a heavy influence on its idiosyncratic sound, which combines genres such as punk blues, art punk, psychedelic rock and noise rock with influences from pop and electronic music. Written by Liddiard with contributions from other members, the lyrics have been described as apocalyptic and darkly humorous; tackling subjects such as technological advancement, political polarization, socioeconomic inequality, xenophobia, culture wars and many others. The album title links a Silicon Valley slang for the physical world with the neurodegenerative disorder of kuru found in the Fore people of Papua New Guinea.

Four singles were released from the album over late 2017 and early 2018. Music videos for each of them (including the track "The Future of History") were also made available on the band's official YouTube channel. Shortly after its release, the band signed with Joyful Noise Recordings, who were responsible for distributing the album in the US. The album enjoyed a "generally favorable reception" internationally, garnering praise for both its raw and unusual style as well as its lyricism. Several noteworthy musicians such as Thalia Zedek and Britt Daniel have also expressed their love for the album since its release, and it went on to appear on numerous year-end lists from publications around the world.

== Background ==
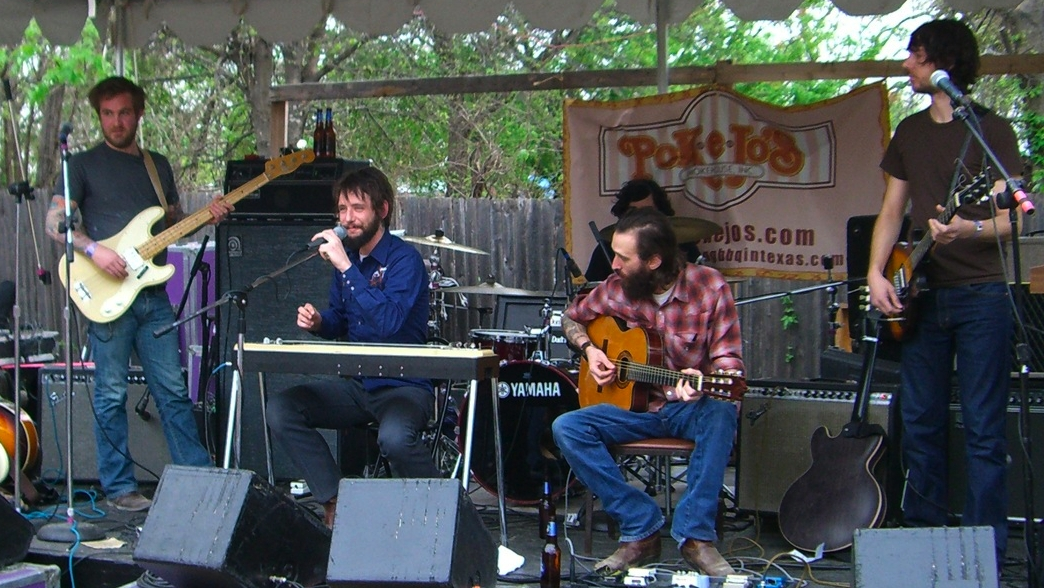
The band's first U.S. tour in 2017 was with Band of Horses (pictured here performing at SXSW in 2006) and King Gizzard & the Lizard Wizard.

After the release of I See Seaweed in 2013, Drones founder Gareth Liddiard expressed his desire to step away from the more rock-centric style of previous Drones albums on Feelin Kinda Free, their final album before going on hiatus. "Before we moved to Melbourne back in the 90s," he said in an interview with Musicfeeds, "we were a very weird sounding band. It was Melbourne that turned us more into a rock band, which kind of helped us to get gigs. This is a return to the way we were before in a way – getting drunk, getting stoned, noodling on anything you can find and making weird little songs." The year following their hiatus, Liddiard and longtime bandmate Fiona Kitschin started writing material for a new project under the name for the record label (coined by Dan Kelly) under which the last Drones album was self-released. The pair recruited Erica Dunn (Palm Springs) and Lauren Hammel (High Tension) during the summer of 2017, prior to embarking on an American tour. According to Dunn, "They just rang me up. Gareth and Fi were on loudspeaker like excited children. The pitch was 'Do you want to play guitar? We’re just going to do some weird shit.' And I was like 'Okay, sure.' Then Gareth said 'We might go to America in the next month, are you free? And we have to write some songs.' Sure I'll clear my schedule. Hammer [Lauren Hammel] was a bit different though, because [Gareth] didn't know her and he had to take her to the pub." Shortly thereafter, the band embarked on a tour of the U.S. with Band of Horses and King Gizzard & the Lizard Wizard during the autumn of 2017.

== Recording ==
Teenage Engineering OP-1 keys and drum machines. Anything made by Eventide. Granular Effects stompboxes. Lots of weird obscure iPhone drum machine apps. Contact mics. Tea towels gaffed onto all the drums. Magic mushrooms.

— Gareth Liddiard on the gear & equipment that inspired the album's sound

A Laughing Death in Meatspace was finished in less than eight months after the band played their first shows in September 2017. Recorded by the members themselves at their home studio (titled Dodgy Brothers Studio), Liddiard later said that it was "all done in a rush [...] it was weird. Mad experimentation really, at the same time trying to keep it groovy and succinct. Trying to figure out what kind of weird angle can each of us fit. Everything was written fast, [...] It was a good way to make a record. We didn’t have much time to reflect which is good. We just banged everything out and got on the road." In an interview with Happy Mag, he also stated that the record was made while the members were learning to be a band together: "So it’s not perfect or fully formed or anything but it’s cool."

On being asked of the album's "really interesting" use of guitar fuzz on tracks such as "Antimatter Animals" and "The Future of History", Liddiard revealed that he'd tried to "mix into the box as much as possible.... compress, eq, effects and dirt etc. I like to print it all coz otherwise you never make any hard decisions and shit gets bogged down [...] Digital is crystal clear and clean so it’s actually kinda hard to dirty everything up." He added: "I have a bunch of old Quad Eight and Electrodyne and API and JLM stuff and I just crank the gain and try to knock the peaks of on the line amps. Then I hardly compress anything after that." After recording the drums, the band would use ProTools to manipulate certain portions of the groove, creating "the most unlikely sort of beat". This was done in order to "get away from that four on the floor, classic John Bonham [drumming style]. [...] It’s gotta be groovy."

== Musical style ==
The explosions in "Two Afternoons," "A Laughing Death," and "Rubber Bullies" are glorious and frightening, so big they don't feel quite real, but there's a story trying to climb out of the noise, carried by Liddiard's weariness, his uncynical fatalism, but shaped by the counter-vocals of Kitschin and Dunn. Liddiard is responding instinctively to the war they are all describing; they are thinking about it. Soon you may begin to hear him as the background singer, and the women in the background as the leads. The balance shifts inside the songs, back and forth, back and forth, and you can feel as if this is what history sounds like as it's being written.

— Greil Marcus on the album's sound.

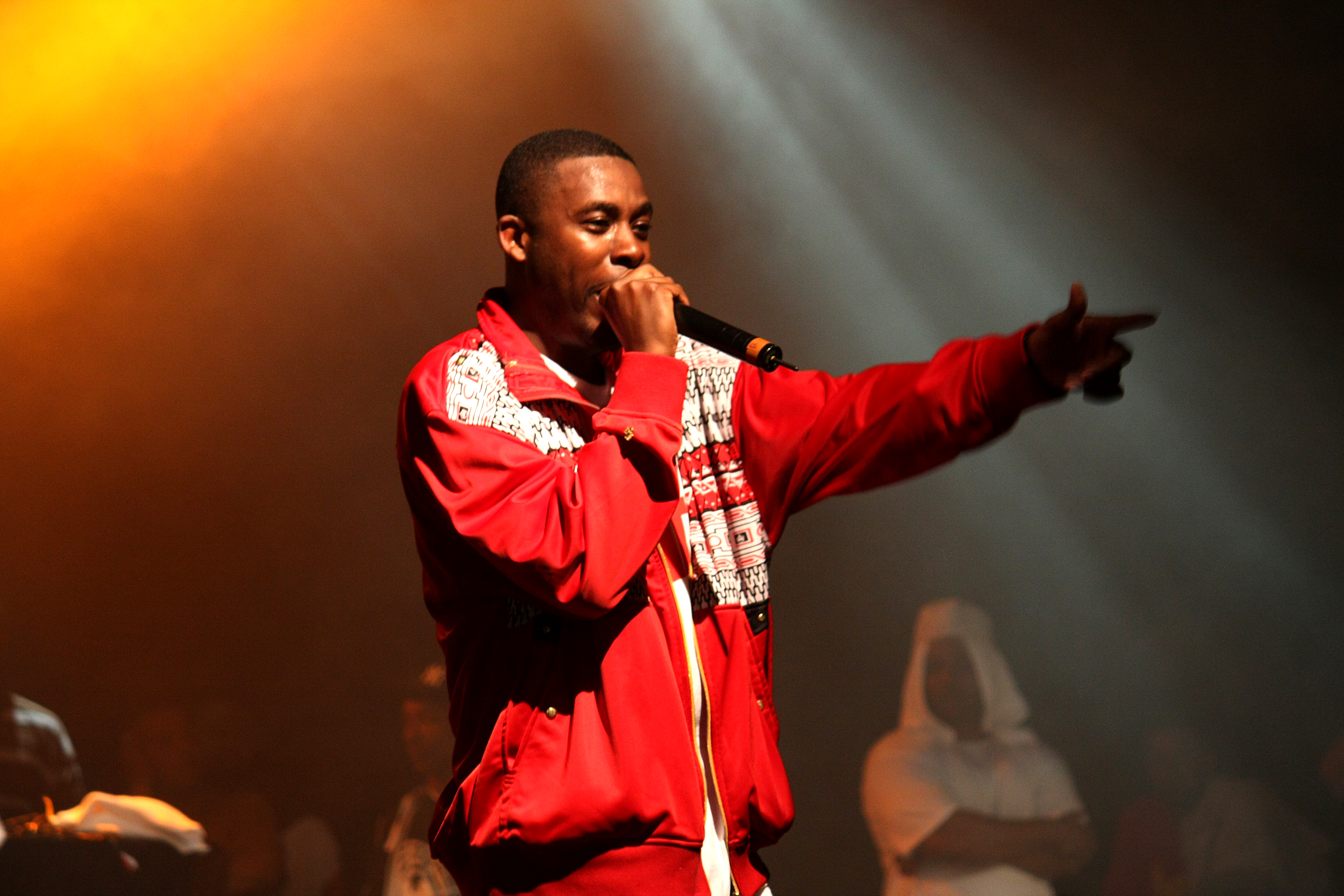
GZA (pictured here performing in New York City, 2008) was one of many hip-hop and electronic musicians who influenced the album's sound.

In interviews, the band said that they were "thinking about what [they] were not going to do" whilst recording the album. "The only loose reference", Liddiard revealed, "was a Fela Kuti type thing where it's more groove based, girl vocals and boy vocals, but instead of having boys back girls or girls back the boys, it’s on a more even keel. It's more rhythmic." The band were also listening to Suburban Lawns and hip-hop musicians such as GZA. Liddiard had also expressed his appreciation for pop & electronic musicians & producers such as Rihanna, Blevin Blectum, Missy Elliott and Timbaland, calling the latter two "iconoclasts". In other interviews, Gareth listed Mohamed Rouicha, George Michael, James Brown and Captain Beefheart as influences, and described the record's sound as "funky". Of the songwriting process, he said: "I’m deliberately trying to write shorter, and more sort of pop. In The Drones it’s a savoury thing, but this it’s trying for something sweet and savoury, more like Talking Heads—it’s a minor chord thing but you can dance to it. It’s like a [...] [s]mall budget disaster movie. [...] There’s a sense of fun, a playfulness".

Critics have varied in describing the album's musical style. "There are elements of blues, psychedelic rock, and art-punk," wrote Liam Martin for AllMusic, "but TFS actively resist any concrete genre tags, which gives them the freedom to walk a familiar path before sharply turning into something else." No Ripcord found the band on the album to be "less Gang Of Four than they are The Pop Group, a similar level of poetic critique and takedowns packaged and delivered with unsettling and risky discord, a veritable junkyard sculpture thoughtfully constructed from punk scraps, crusty psychedelia and a rhythmic articulation of ideas bred from the spoken word." Michael Toland noted, with respect to Feelin Kinda Free, that "the empty spaces and electronic atmospheres have been folded into the background, with guitars back up front and in your face. Kitschin and Dunn soak the arrangements in wild-eyed harmonies and Liddiard’s brilliantly wordy lyrics and off-kilter melodies are in full effect." Matt Yuyitung of Exclaim! described it as "a scrappy psychedelic sound that sits somewhere between Tame Impala and the garage rock howl of King Gizzard and the Lizard Wizard". Loud and Quiet, however, described it as "an absolute noise rock maelstrom. Here is your proverbial tempest in a teapot." Chad Parkhill of The Quietus similarly noted "an unhinged and feral energy that pulses through these nine songs and goes beyond the considerable demented racket that the Drones are able to conjure at their finest: it’s less full-frontal sonic assault and more auditory guerrilla warfare, full of surprising textures and scrappy tones." Punknews, on the other hand, described the sound as resembling "Jon Spencer Blues Explosion jamming with mid-nineties Fugazi."

== Lyrics and themes ==
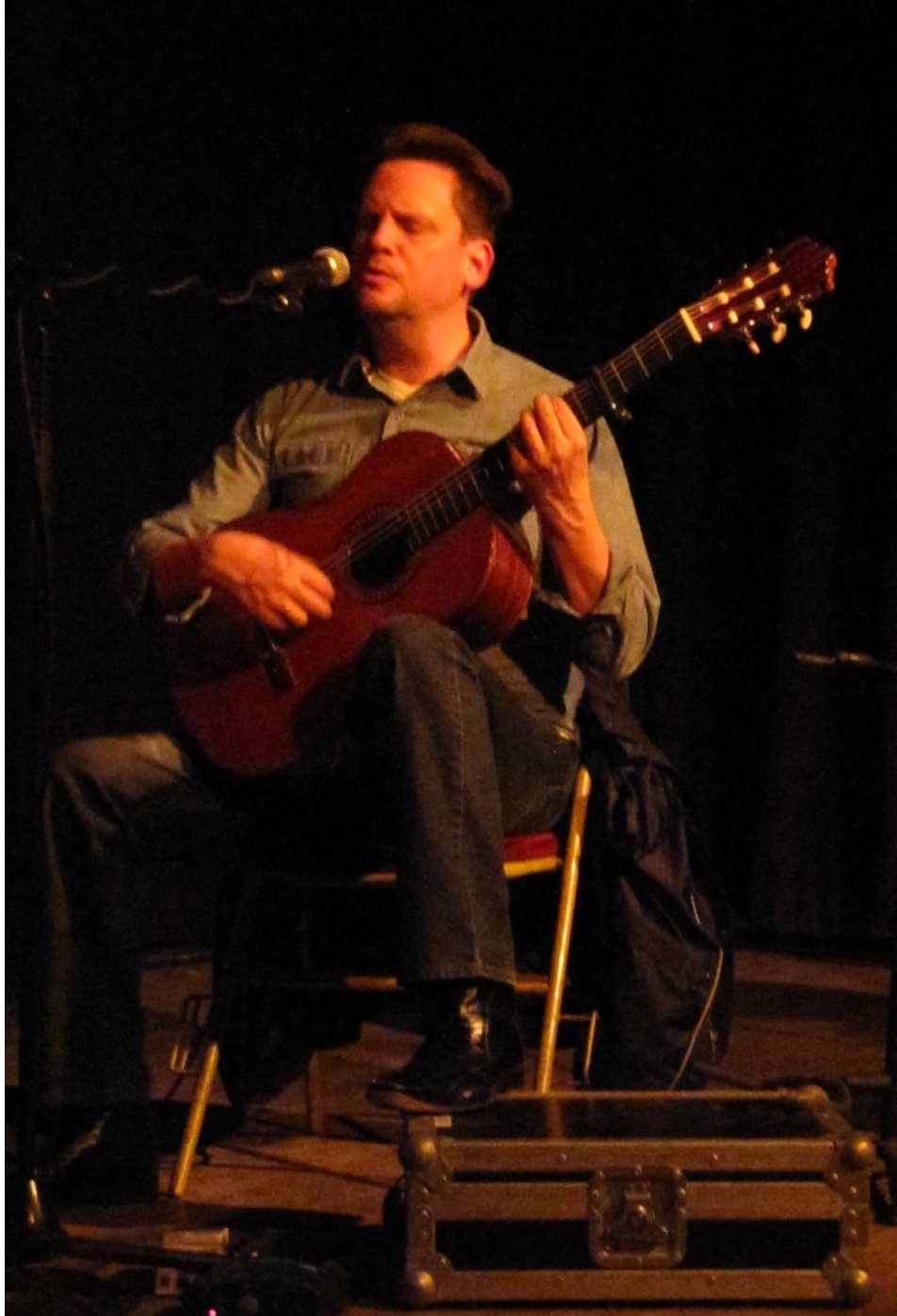
Mark Kozelek (pictured here performing with Sun Kil Moon in Paris, 2014) was cited as an influence on the album's lyrical style.

Liddiard described his lyrical "outlook" in Tropical Fuck Storm to be that of “a flawed narrator thinking about a bunch of flawed things. They're all struggling and it's really hard. Some have it harder then others obviously. But it's like that John Gray quote, “We’re just a bunch of struggling ephemeral animals.” And everyone's dinged up like an old car." The speed at which the album was recorded also ended up influencing the themes that appeared on it: "We had to keep churning out material, [...] So whatever we were thinking about seeped into the music.” He had also expressed his desire to step away from the more didactic lyrics he'd written for The Drones: "I just wanted to de-wank. I just want to keep it straight talk. Sometimes it gets a bit flowery. Half the time I like it and shoot the target. I want to keep it simple." He cited hip hop music and Mark Kozelek as influences on his writing style, calling the latter's "recent stuff" "fucking insane. It’s all about nothing, you go “this guy’s not singing about anything” but then he’s singing about more shit than any other white person is. It’s about everything and nothing like “Seinfeld” or something." He also revealed that he would be helped out by "[t]he other guys in the band" when it came to lyrics: "Often they’ll say “that’s shit” so I have to start again. They’ll come up with the lines. They’ll even say something in conversation and I’ll be like “Oh, that’s good.” It can be good to work on these things by yourself but sometimes you got to work on words with other people." Liam Martin of AllMusic observed: "Lyrically there's a lot to filter through, with layers of allegory and a dense poetic delivery. A scholarly approach reveals much deeper meaning in the lyrics, as they take stabs at online culture, politics, and the mess we're in as a species, yet they can be enjoyed on a surface level for their disorienting nature alone." A Punknews review also noted the influence of Mark E. Smith in "Libbiard’s [sic] ability to turn a phrase" in tracks such as "Anitmatter Animals" and "Soft Power".

Jenny Valentish of The Guardian wrote that the album "mostly laments technological advancement, albeit with a gallows humour". According to Fiona Kitschin, modern social media was a "disastrous factor, worthy of its own category" when it came to writing the lyrics on the album. On having the album compared by a certain interviewer to "a Twitter feed being directly plugged into your mind", Liddiard criticized what he saw to be the superficiality and moral/political polarization of social media users: "The anxiety is just so high, they just cry when they’re talking about it. Feeling like they can’t say anything, so constricted in their social movements, they don’t want to be outed for some tiny misdemeanor, destroyed [in a] completely fucking out of proportion way. It’s like torture. This constant Sword of Damocles hanging over their heads. I feel bad for them." (Despite this, "he reckons Twitter has been useful for LBGTQI+ advocacy and for movements including #MeToo".) He has also been critical of the jargon used by those on the political-left, "where people talk in a similar way to AFL footballers, in that they’ve been trained to say this empty bullshit [...] You think in whatever language you speak, and if you can’t understand that language properly, you can’t think properly."

Tying into the above, Lauren Hammel admitted the band were fans of sci-fi and dystopian films & literature. Many critics similarly noted apocalyptic & post-apocalyptic themes in the album's lyrics. Nathan Stevens of Spectrum Culture wrote that the band are "already seeing Mad Maxian futures that are rapidly becoming present realities and might just know how to survive."

== Songs ==
=== Tracks 1–3 ===
[The song] is basically about the real word; ordinary life, and how drab and featureless it seems until you write it down, and then you see it's pretty wild. They say that good books make shit movies and shit books make good movies. So if you're depressed and you feel like your life resembles a shit book, congratulations.

— Gareth Liddiard on the song "You Let My Tyres Down"

The opening track "You Let My Tyres Down" is a garage rock and blues rock song with a tempo of 132 beats per minute. The song "explodes with distortion laden blues guitar, that brings to mind the guitar melodies of Built to Spill or Teenage Fanclub, if the distortion were cranked to eleven and channeled through Jon Spencer styled blues." The song has been described as a "a blues-rock titan worthy of Cream’s finest freakouts" which opens with "the cleanest thematic riff on the LP". The lyrics, set in the Sunshine suburb of Melbourne, have been described as a "a frightful character study of a renegade youth who’s in jail for attacking a mall cop." The song incorporates several personal details from Liddiard's own childhood in Perth, and also explores economic inequality "as [he] yelps and spits irreverent lyrics capturing the violence all along the edge of the class divide." Liddiard's vocal performance on this track has earned comparisons to that of Nick Cave in that "[t]here’s an awareness of the darkness, and a kind of sneering, self-effacing humor that drags syllables beyond their natural end." The song "informs Meatspace both on lyrical and musical content. Something feels broken about the instruments. The guitars just a microtone off, the drums shuddering on the beat and the bass creeping up like kudzu vines. This perfectly complements Liddiard’s sharp eye for systems rusting and breaking into pieces, taking human sacrifice as they groan their last."

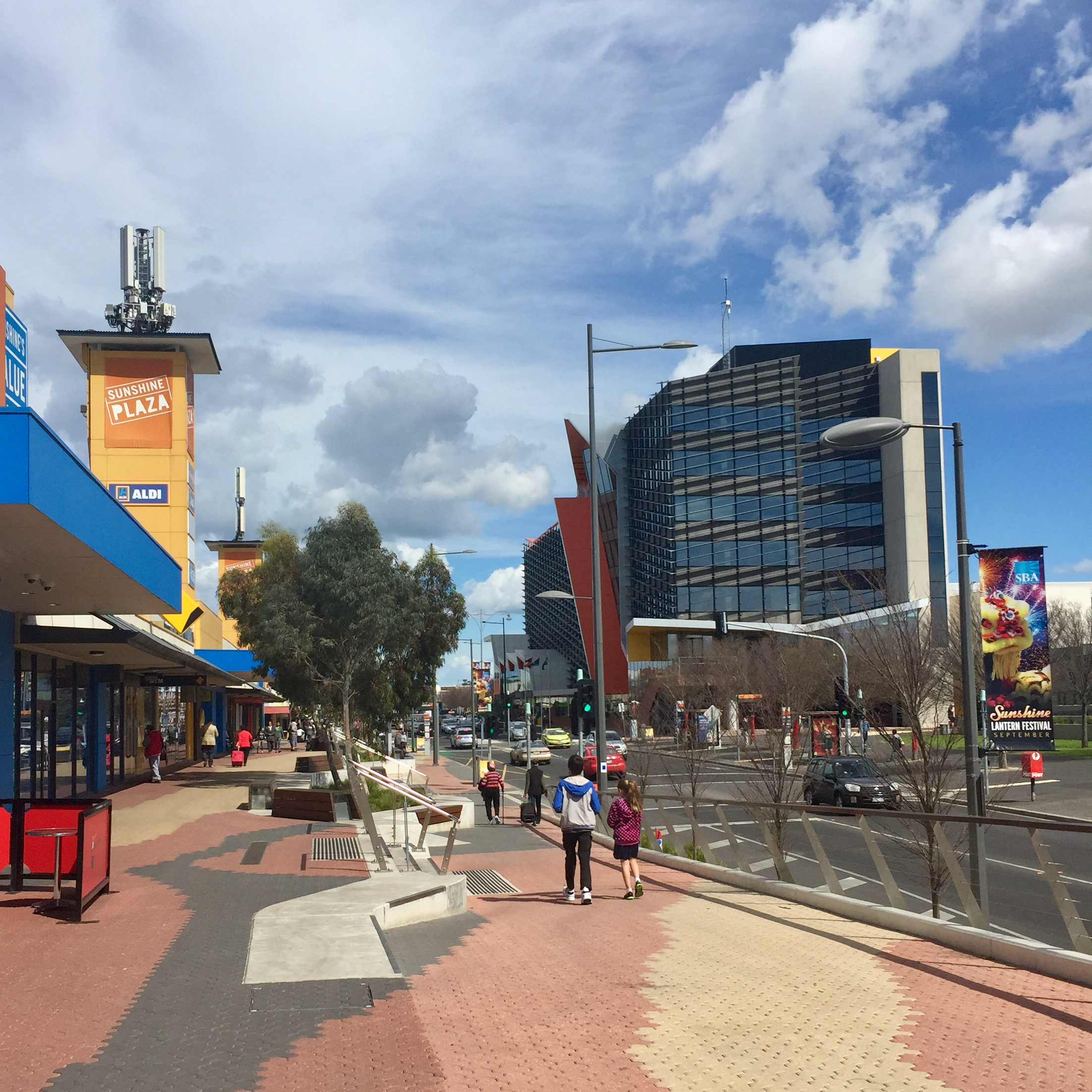
The lyrics to "You Let My Tyres Down" are set in the Sunshine suburb of Melbourne (whose town centre is pictured here).

"Antimatter Animals" has been described as a "disjointed loop", featuring "synthesized splats and bleeps [that] add a machined feel to its already robotic stride and droning low end." The song "fizzes with venom as Liddiard, Dunn and Hammel chant, 'Your politics ain't nothing but a fond fuck-you'" towards the end. Composition-wise, the song "draws on nursery rhyme sensibilities: nihilism, the slow gruesome peaks and troughs of civilisation thinly veiled by dead-eyed cuteness/deranged pop melodies, misanthropy. It reads like the spiritual disfigurement of 'A Ring around the Rosie', appropriated and cosmically aberrated to echo in the year 2018." Kitschin's distorted bass playing on this song has been described as "all-consuming". "Even at a less intense pace and instrumentation," Kris Handel writes for Post-Trash, "the frustration and disappointments carry a powerful intensity that TFS know how to fully capitalize upon." In an interview with Spectrum Culture, Liddiard agreed that the song "[deals] with coming to terms with being forgotten" and "being made redundant", despite acknowledging "a tongue in cheek element" in the lyrics.

"Chameleon Paint", the first single from the album, "starts like it's going to be synthpop, but layers fractured guitar lines over the groove almost immediately", and features a "singalong chorus" in which Kitschin & Dunn engage in vocal call and response with Liddiard. In it, "Dunn's seasick, off-key riffs jostle with Kitschin’s overdriven bassline and Hammel’s brutal pounding, while Liddiard yowls over the top in his distinctive nasal ’Strayan." The song has been described as a "sequel to The Drone's [sic] track, 'The Minotaur', which appeared on the 2008 album Havilah. This track [...] is a spectacular astral projection of Havilah-era guitar tones and themes." The lyrics are "a damning indictment on holier than thou behaviour and social media surveillance" and sees Liddiard "[flipping] a not so elegant bird to armchair commentators and airhead TV personalities [...] 'And all this scot-free moralising's got/ Me quite demoralized' he admits, scrolling through Twitter and seeing a cavalcade of internet warriors who never get off their asses."

=== Tracks 4–6 ===
America is the cop of the world. Or the boss of the world since War World II [sic]. A lot of people go "Fuck America, fuck them, they're in charge." Thing is, you're not perfect but, ok would you prefer to have China in charge? Or Saudi Arabia? Or Russia? [...] It's the least of a bunch of fucked options, having the US in charge. Mainly what the end part of that song is about, "Bye-bye scarecrow" it's taken from The Wizard of Oz but the scarecrow is the USA. Scarecrows are useful, they're not perfect, but they're fucking better than a lot of other options. [...] With Trump, turning inwards, turning the country inwards and abandoning the rest of us to China and Russia. That's the scariest thing, that frightens me more than Trump starting a nuclear war with North Korea or whatever. It's more just being abandoned to fucking Russia. Russia would have us if they could. Only reason they didn't turn the west into a bunch of communists is because we nuked Japan. We didn't nuke Japan because we wanted to necessarily finish their war, we were showing Russia what we could do. It's awful. The world is an awful place. That's what kept the USA in charge for fuckin' 75 years. And now Trump’s going to throw that all away. It's scary, scary times.

— Gareth Liddiard on the lyrics to "Soft Power".

"The Future of History" has been described as a "fuzz-laden rhumba [...] guitar strings bent to a choke as the track swings, a multi-syllabic hook melodically rapped over a warped and blocky kick drum." The song sees the band take "a funkier turn" on what has been further described as "[a] seriously demented dance tune, [which] grooves and bops along a maxed out beat, accompanied by percussive muted guitars and an unsettling cheshire cat grin of chattering bursts of distortion." The lyrics describe the 1996-97 chess matches between Garry Kasparov and the IBM Deep Blue chess computer. It has been praised as being "probably the sexiest song about chess ever made", and as a "highlight of narrative songwriting, not only on this album, across most albums that have been released so far [in 2018]." The song "[imagines] the very possible future where the robots taking all the work isn’t a utopia, but a hellscape of inequality." It has been called the album's "thematic centrepiece, [...] Nearly every line is an acerbic zinger". In the song's chorus, the band "[tangles] model numbers of retro IBM microprocessors with catchy choruses about technological horrorshows."

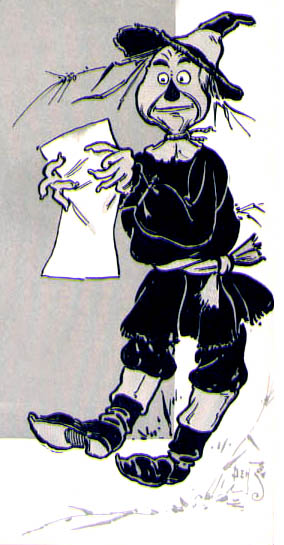
The scarecrow from The Wizard of Oz (W.W. Denslow's illustration of which is pictured here) is referenced towards the end of "Soft Power" as a metaphor for the U.S..

The fifth track "Two Afternoons" "attacks in a ferocious manner with squealing and screaming guitars fighting for space between extremely forceful drum work and chanting-esque vocals that create a hum that covers the sonic atmosphere". It features "little keyboard breaks that add a bit of a middle-eastern influence to the sound." Its rhythm section has been described as "loping" and "driving", the latter adjective also used in describing its "effects-laden" guitarwork. The lyrics have been described as a "not so flattering examination of organized religion" and as "a modern reimagining of 'Zorba The Greek'. Tropical Fuck Storm [...] reincarnates Zorba’s musings on religion, life, and being working class in a masterful sonic koan; boiling images of hope and escape." On being asked about the contrasting parts of the song, Liddiard replied that the band tried structuring it like a Beatles track: "each of those pieces need to be so different from one another that we’ll literally record them completely separate from one another. On a different day in a different place. And the only thing we’d have in mind would be the tempo, it would be the only common thing."

On "Soft Power", a "sluggish garage blues number", the band "[take] things down a notch as they once again find a pocket in a groove that pushes everything along and works very nicely with Lilliard’s [sic] unique vocal flow and ranting." The song also "enforces the importance of Kitschin": "As the quartet’s arrangement seems to collapse into a workable boom-bap, Liddiard spills his verses [...], observations and fantasies dystopic as Kitschin’s vocal captures the track’s anxiety, her simple repetition of phrases effective against the noisy collection of sounds behind her." Her and Dunn's backing vocals were also emphasized by Michael Toland, who further noted the use of "shrieking feedback" and "understated drums" on the song. The track "slowly builds to a near-apocalyptic crescendo". At 3:10, the song "cuts off mid-yelp, like the goon squad finally cracked down on this nuttiness, leaving a ghostly chorus in the wake of the rip-roaring guitar". The coda that makes up the latter half of the song has been described as "powerfully melancholic". Lyrically, the song has been described as the "culmination" of Liddiard's fury "at the techies and the Facebook culture wars. The constant shouting from Democrats of “they go low, we go high” falls deaf on his jaded ears when he’s staring “Oompa Loompa with the nukes” in the eyes. “Fuck soft power” he hollers, demanding an end to hand-wringing, “influence” and “persuasion” as the rules of combat when the other side is wielding a flamethrower." The song "blurs the line between present and post-apocalyptic states" and "finishes with a quiet goodbye to the characters of Happy Days and the scarecrow from The Wizard of Oz", while its lyrical themes "[cycle] from nuclear arms to class inequality to the impending release of Top Gun 2, unable to bring anything into focus." The track's contrasting use of "jovial pop culture references while the world burns" has earned comparisons to Childish Gambino's "This Is America". In an interview with Spectrum Culture, Liddiard mentioned that the second half of the track was recorded separately, and that he thought the bass-line "was cool ‘cause it sounded like an Ice-T song called “Colors” [...] I remember seeing it on TV and thinking “Holy shit, what the fuck is this?” It was the heaviest thing I’d ever seen, heaviest music I’d ever heard."

=== Tracks 7–9 ===
My dad grew up in Rio, he was born in Rio. My best friend who was in the Drones [Rui Pereira], he grew up in Rio. My grandma comes from Buenos Aires. They're all English, but English migrants to Brazil. There's a lot of Rio in me in a way. And we went there last year and hung out for a bit. It's a city that's part of my family story. It has an effect on me. [...] It's all just subconscious stuff. I really haven't had time to reflect on that, or any of the songs really that much. [...] So “Rubber Bullies” probably has a lot of shit that's personal, but I haven't gotten around to figuring out.

— Gareth Liddiard on the Brazilian references in the final stanza of "Rubber Bullies".

"Shellfish Toxin" is an instrumental. It begins with the sounds of "seagulls laugh[ing] and the rapid-fire of sci-fi weapons blast[ing] in the distance, incidental sounds eventually fading out as some guitar notes are plucked and synthesized tones waver. A slow drum arrangement enters, with a breathy vocal introduced as accompaniment." The song "gradually deteriorates like an acid trip at the beach gone wrong" and has been described as the album's most "anomalous" song. The "deliberately meandering instrumental [...] takes Liddiard into new territory" and has been described as "a queasily beautiful pastiche of surf-rock, Joe Meek and Frank Churchill-esque Hollywood schmaltz." "There’s a hymnal quality to this track" observes We Are Raw Meat, "think Twin Peaks theme meets St Kilda." In interviews, Liddiard stated that the song's title was a reference to the CIA project MKNAOMI "which used shellfish poisoning against enemy agents, which wasn’t made to kill them but make them feel dreadful and insane for a while. Maybe while they were on a mission or something."

The "dreamy, sprawling" title track has been described as "a moody slowburner" that is "mostly subdued and slow, though balanced by moments of intensity". The song "concludes with an optimistic key change, sanguine chants pouring from a silo of twisted riffs and night terrors". Lyrically, the song takes the themes explored previously on "The Future of History" "to [their] logical conclusion: the post-apocalyptic wasteland that’s left after Silicon Valley’s tech lords’ accelerationist philosophy has burned the planet to a crisp." "As is the trademark of other tracks on the album", notes We Are Raw Meat, the song "is a potluck of (pop) cultural references sewn into a pastiche embodying annihilation."

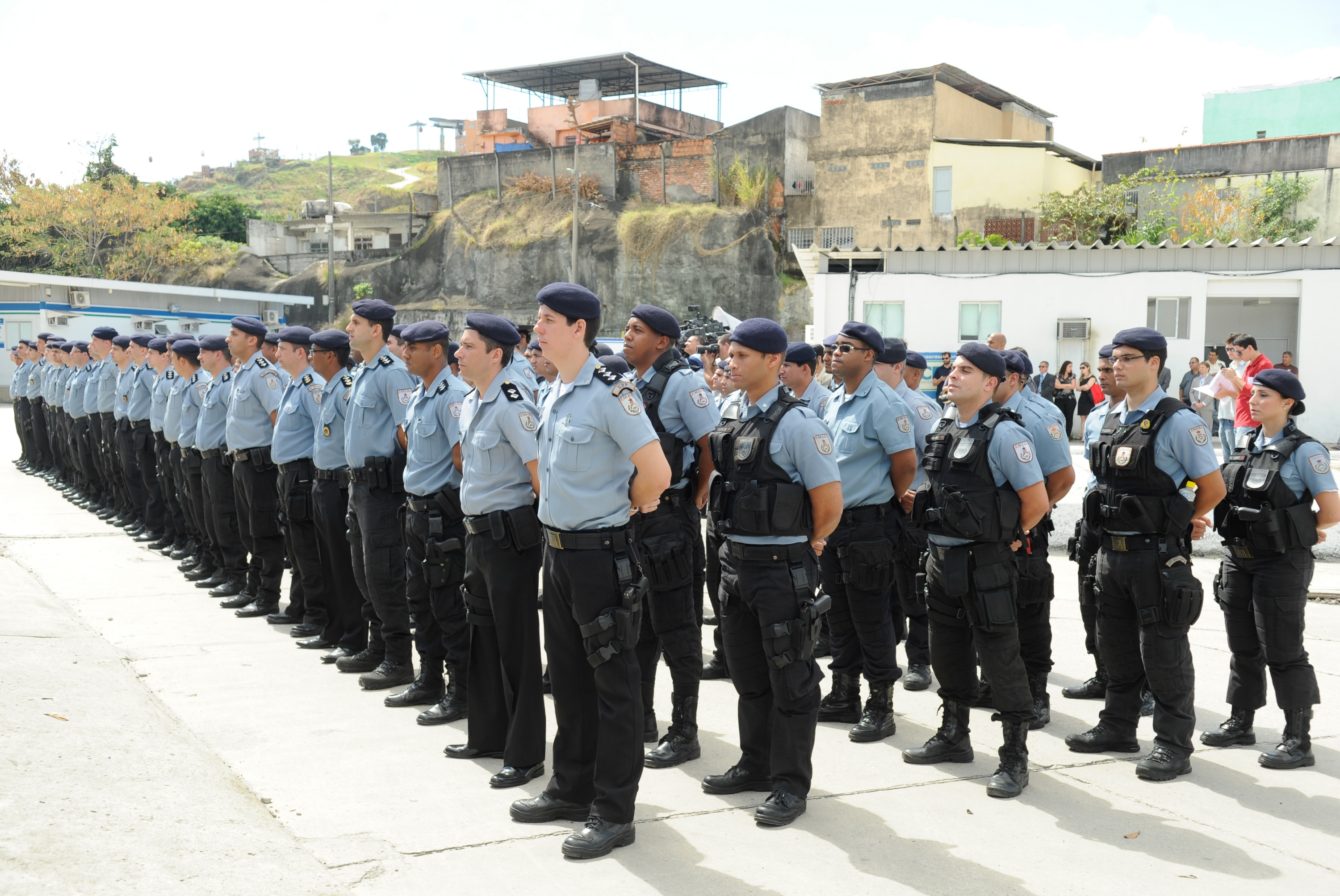
The UPP (pictured here) is one of many Brazilian references present in the final stanza of "Rubber Bullies".

The "ominous" and "hypnotic" final track "Rubber Bullies", the album's longest at over 6 minutes, opens with a "malevolent chuckle". It features "slinky bass" and "staccato guitars" that are "[a]nchored by Kistchin and Hammel, their rhythm section reserved and patient for most of the track’s runtime". Described as being driven by a "total sense of calamity", the song "details a world overloaded by advertising, run by “plutocrats and sycophants” and filled with “Foot long subdivisions/So cheap they won’t outlast/Your disapproval or their doormats”." The stream of consciousness lyrics are delivered "[w]ith the conversational pace of a man telling a story" and consist of "the narrator’s impressions of his surroundings and the futility of the experiences he details [...] [,] ending the album with [...] an air of pensiveness, the last words being, 'Oh. How? Why? Where we goin' now?'" They "[start] in a supermarket aisle – where the air conditioned air is too cold – before continuing the theme of 'conditioning' by riffing through a list-like barrage of consumeristic deathpits; alluding to the housing crisis in Australia as well as the morally vacuous vortex that is the relationship between landlords/developers/politics." Liam Martin, on the other hand, called it "a sermon to escapism and vapid travelers." The title of the track has been interpreted as a play on rubber bullets, which are "used to disperse riots and protests". On being asked about the Brazilian references (particularly to Rio de Janeiro and the UPP) in the final stanza, Liddiard revealed that most of it was personal in nature.

== Packaging ==
=== Title ===
The Guardian writes: "The album title links 'meatspace' – as Silicon Valley engineers derogatorily refer to the physical realm – with a neurodegenerative disorder called kuru, once found in the Fore people of Papua New Guinea. Men would eat the muscles of the deceased, while women and children ate the brains, thereby inheriting Creutzfeldt-Jakob disease and pot-holing their own grey matter to such an extent that they lost control of their emotions and laughed themselves to death." "The linking of concepts" in the title "could also be read as a play on internet meme culture – the replication, appropriation, aberration, and dissemination of imagery across the cultural vortex of cyberspace works precisely like an untreated circulatory infection; a laughing virus."

=== Cover ===
The cover for the album was designed by Montreal-based artist Joe Becker. After the artwork (titled "The King" in the liner notes to the LP release) was revealed, Liddiard wrote on Facebook: "It looks like it [the album] sounds." Tiny Mix Tapes ranked it the third best album cover art of 2018.

== Singles ==
The album's first single, "Chameleon Paint", was released on SoundCloud on 18 August 2017. This was accompanied by an announcement that the band would release a series of limited edition 7" singles featuring cover art from Joe Becker and b-side covers of songs they "love and wish [they'd] written". The 7" was released on 22 September with a cover of The Nation Blue's "Mansion Family" as its b-side. The 7" for "Soft Power" followed in November, its b-side a cover of Lost Animal's "Lose The Baby".

The end of January the following year saw the release of "You Let My Tyres Down", with its b-side consisting of a cover of Divinyls' "Back to the Wall" sung by Fiona Kitschin. This was accompanied by an announcement of their debut album's title and release date. The song would be performed by the band live on Tom Ballard's ABC Comedy show Tonightly with Tom Ballard a few days prior to the album's release. "Rubber Bullies", the fourth and final single from the album, was released a month prior to the album and featured a cover of Bee Gees' "Stayin' Alive" on its b-side.

=== Videos ===
The animated video for "Chameleon Paint", released in September 2017 through the band's official YouTube channel, was described by IMPOSE as "a 2D arcade video game straight out of the late 80s" filled with "references to technology as well as ongoing social problems". "Soft Power"'s video, released in November 2017, was partly shot in a disused studio "set up like an old House of Horrors" in Little Rock, Arkansas and featured the band members dressed in costumes.

The video for a shorter version of "You Let My Tyres Down", released in January 2018, depicts a dinner sequence featuring the band played in reverse. "Rubber Bullies"' video was released in April 2018 through the same channel. The video to "The Future of History", described by Gigwise as "Black Mirror x The Mighty Boosh x The Cardiacs", was released on 28 September 2018 through Joyful Noise Recordings' official YouTube channel.

== Release ==
The album was released on 4 May 2018, through Mistletone. The album was released in the US through Joyful Noise Recordings – to whom the band had signed – on 26 October that year.

=== Commercial performance ===
On 20 May 2018, A Laughing Death in Meatspace peaked at number 25 on the ARIA Charts. In the US, where the album was released through Joyful Noise Recordings, the album peaked at numbers 46 and 17 on the Billboard Independent Albums and Heatseekers Album charts respectively on 10 November.

=== Critical reception ===
Professional ratings
Aggregate scores
Source	Rating
Metacritic	80/100
Review scores
Source	Rating
AllMusic	4/5 stars
Blurt	4/5 stars
Exclaim!	7/10
Loud and Quiet	9/10
Mojo	3/5 stars
OndaRock	7/10
Q	4/5 stars
Tom Hull	B+
Uncut	8/10
Vice (Expert Witness)	A−

The album received a Metacritic score of 80 based on 10 reviews, indicating "[g]enerally favorable reviews". The Quietus noted that "[s]tarting a new project unencumbered by the Drones’ name or weighty reputation seems to have given Liddiard the freedom to jettison the last remaining trappings of rock traditionalism in his songwriting and let loose, with impressive results." Robert Christgau reviewing the album for Noisey praised the contributions of the band's female members, without which Liddiard's "sociohistorical ravings might evoke a woke Nick Cave flexing his baritone." Despite criticizing his lyrics as being "seldom head-on" in terms of history, he writes that "Liddiard's songs are more sociopolitically situated than less verbose types generally manage, plus there's a Trump number where an Oompa Loompa brandishes drones and nukes [...] In most rock, this kind of dark joke comes off cheap if not stupid. Tropical Fuck Storm know how to scare you with them." Spectrum Culture wrote that "[t]here's a newfound focus on A Laughing Death in Meatspace. The Drones were an explicitly political band, but TFS is even sharper in their dissections of corruption and xenophobia in a melting world." Loud and Quiet described the album as "observant and eviscerating, clever wordplay tangled up in sharply boomeranging riffs [...] the soundtrack to the last party at the end of the world." Blurt's Michael Toland was similarly positive, calling the album "both a retrenchment and an evolution" with respect to the Drones' latter-day releases. He concludes: "It's a combination of old and new, letting Liddiard play to his strengths as a writer while letting a new band paint his compositions in different colors. That blend of comfort and risk makes A Laughing Death in Meatspace one of the best rock records of 2018."

More mixed reviews came from Exclaim!, who wrote that "[w]hile their debut record doesn't have the lasting power of King Gizzard or Tame Impala's best work, it still shows a group unafraid to take risks and get messy, and their exploration results in some interesting material." Mojo wrote that the band's "wonky rock discordance is not quite as provocative as they perhaps think. Nevertheless, there's still plenty to be enjoyed here."

=== Contemporary reception ===
Both Thalia Zedek and Conan Neutron named it their favorite album of the year, with the latter calling it "[a]bsolutely powerful stuff. Great songs with incredible left turns. Moody, claustrophobic and staggeringly self aware, like a sentient computer raised on Bill Hicks comedy specials, Howard Zinn, Black MIrror [sic] and Twin Peaks. [...] It's a hell of a ride." In an interview in 2019, Britt Daniel mentioned his love for the band and called the album "[f]antastic. [Gareth Liddard's] lyrics are so good." DMA's ranked the track "You Let My Tyres Down" as their favorite song of the year for Triple J Hottest 100. In an interview with Pitchfork, New Weird author Jeff VanderMeer cited the album as one of many influences on his 2019 novel Dead Astronauts.

=== Accolades ===
The users of Sputnikmusic voted it one of the 50 best albums of 2018. Q included the track "You Let My Tyres Down" on their list of the top 20 tracks of 2018. The following year, The Music Network would include the track on their list of "The 100 best Australian songs of the decade", while Junkee went on to include the track "Chameleon Paint" on their list of "The 200 Greatest Australian Songs Of All Time" (which was partially based on submissions from other Australian musicians). French webzine Mowno included the album on their list of the 100 best albums of the decade.

Accolades for A Laughing Death in Meatspace
Publication	Country	Accolade	Rank
The Quietus	UK	The Quietus Albums of the Year 2018	16
Sputnikmusic	US	Staff's Top 50 Albums of 2018	22
Brooklyn Vegan	US	Brooklyn Vegan's Top 50 Albums of 2018	47
Brooklyn Vegan	US	Bill's Indie Basement: Favorite Albums of 2018	8
Slate	US	Slate's Best Albums of 2018	*
Double J	Australia	Double J's 50 Best Albums of 2018	12
Robert Christgau	US	2018: Dean's List	74
BBC (Late Junction)	UK	Late Junction Albums of the Year 2018	*
The Attic	Romania/Norway	Favourite Albums of 2018	*
France Inter	France	Best of 2018: rock'n'roll and punk rock	*
AllMusic (Rich Wilson)	US	AllMusic Loves 2018	*
Porcys	Poland	Recap 2018: Indie	*
Mondo Sonoro	Spain	The best international albums of 2018	16

* designates unordered lists.

=== Awards and nominations ===
The album was longlisted for the Australian Music Prize of 2018, but failed to make the shortlist. The album was also nominated for "Best Rock/Punk Album" at the Music Victoria Awards of 2018, losing out to the self-titled album from Little Ugly Girls.

== Track listing ==
All tracks are written by Tropical Fuck Storm.

A Laughing Death in Meatspace track listing
No.	Title	Length
1.	"You Let My Tyres Down"	5:41
2.	"Antimatter Animals"	5:14
3.	"Chameleon Paint"	4:30
4.	"The Future of History"	4:25
5.	"Two Afternoons"	4:33
6.	"Soft Power"	5:48
7.	"Shellfish Toxin"	5:35
8.	"A Laughing Death in Meatspace"	5:31
9.	"Rubber Bullies"	6:01
Total length:		47:18

== Personnel ==
- Fiona Kitschin – bass, vocals
- Lauren Hammel – drums
- Erica Dunn – guitar, keyboards, vocals
- Gareth Liddiard – guitar, vocals

=== Additional credits ===
- Amy Burrows – layout
- John Ruberto – mastering
- Gareth Liddiard – mixing
- Aaron Cupples – mixing
- Joe Becker – cover
- Jamie Wdziekonski – back cover photo
- Gareth Liddiard – recording
- Aaron Cupples, Sara Retallick – recording
- Ralf The Fox Terrier – vocals
- BJ Morriszonkle – keyboards, sounds (tracks 7 & 8), percussion, drum machine, synthesizer

== Charts ==
Chart performance for A Laughing Death in Meatspace
Chart (2018)	Peak position
Australian Albums (ARIA)	25
US Independent Albums (Billboard)	46
US Heatseekers Albums (Billboard)	17
