= Music Victoria Awards of 2019 =

Annual Australian music awards ceremony

- Date: 20 November 2019
- Venue: The Melbourne Recital Centre, Melbourne, Victoria
- Hosted by: Lyndelle Wilkinson and Chris Gill

Highlights
- Most wins: The Teskey Brothers (4)
- Most nominations: Sampa The Great, The Teskey Brothers, Tropical Fuck Storm, Gordon Koang (5)

The Music Victoria Awards of 2019 are the 14th Annual Music Victoria Awards and consist of a series of awards, presented on 22 November 2019, during Melbourne Music Week. The Award for The Best Global Act changed its name to Best Intercultural Act.

== Hall of Fame inductees ==
- PBS 106.7FM, Vika & Linda Bull

Now entering its 40th year, PBS (Progressive Broadcasting Service) was conceived in 1979 as a community, member-based radio station unimpeded by commercial interests and dedicated to sharing and promoting diverse music not heard on other stations.

Vika and Linda Bull have forged diverse pathways into soul, gospel, blues, country and the island music of their Tongan ancestry. They have spawned eight albums of their own, as well as illuminating studio and concert performances by Paul Kelly, Rockwiz, C.W. Stoneking, Deborah Conway, Kasey Chambers and many more. They were inducted by Kate Ceberano.

== Outstanding Achievement award ==
- Tones and I

== Award nominees and winners ==
=== General awards ===
Voted on by the public. Winners indicated in boldface, with other nominees in plain.

Best Victorian Album	Best Victorian Song
**The Teskey Brothers - Run Home Slow**; Amyl and the Sniffers - Amyl and the Sniffers; Gregor - Silver Drop; On Diamond - On Diamond; Angie McMahon - Salt	**The Teskey Brothers - "So Caught Up"**; Briggs - "Life is Incredible"; Cash Savage and the Last Drinks - "Good Citizens"; Gordon Koang - "Stand Up (Clap Your Hands)"; Sampa The Great - "Final Form"
Best Male Musician	Best Female Musician
**Paul Kelly**; Davey Lane; Gareth Liddiard (Tropical Fuck Storm); Gordon Koang; Stu Mackenzie (King Gizzard and The Lizard Wizard)	**Erica Dunn (Tropical Fuck Storm, Palm Springs, Mod Con, Harmony)**; Angie McMahon; Courtney Barnett; Romy Vager (RVG); Sampa Tembo (Sampa The Great)
Best Band	Best Solo Artist
**The Teskey Brothers**; King Gizzard and the Lizard Wizard; Amyl and the Sniffers; Cash Savage and The Last Drinks; Tropical Fuck Storm	**Courtney Barnett**; Sampa The Great; Baker Boy; Angie McMahon; Gordon Koang; Alex Lahey; Palm Springs; Olympia; DRMNGNOW; Gregor
Breakthrough Victorian Act of 2019	Best Live Act
**G Flip**; DRMNGNOW; Gena Rose Bruce; Gordon Koang; Tones and I	King Gizzard & the Lizard Wizard; Amyl and the Sniffers; Sampa The Great; Tropical Fuck Storm; Mildlife
Best Venue (Over 500 Capacity)	Best Venue (Under 500 Capacity)
**Forum, Melbourne**; The Croxton Bandroom, Thornbury; Hamer Hall, Melbourne; Melbourne Recital Centre; Corner Hotel, Richmond	**Northcote Social Club, Northcote**; The Gasometer, Collingwood; Howler, Brunswick; The Old Bar, Fitzroy; The Tote Hotel, Collingwood

=== Genre Specific Awards ===
Voted by a select industry panel

Best Blues Album	Best Country Album
**Opelousas - Opelousified**; Anna Scionti - Orphan Diary; Catfish Voodoo - Cookin' With…; Julian James - Silver Spade; TK Reeve - Wanna Feel Good	**Matt Joe Gow - Break, Rattle and Roll**; Kate Alexander + Hana Brenecki - Don't You Have Better Things to Do?; Mick Thomas' Roving Commission - Coldwater DFU; Nathan Seeckts - The Heart of the City; Sean McMahon - You Will Know When You're There
Best Electronic Act	Best Experimental/Avant-Garde Act
**Sui Zhen**; CORIN; DJ Plead; Kirkis; Rings Around Saturn	**Naretha Williams**; Cat Hope; CORIN (Corin Ileto); Diimpa (William Elm); Uboa (Xandra Metcalfe)
Best Folk or Roots Album	Best Heavy Album
**The Maes - The Maes**; Cat & Clint - The Days That Used to Be; Lucie Thorne - KITTY & FRANK; Roolya Boolya - Running to You; The Teskey Brothers - Run Home Slow	**Suldusk - Lunar Falls**; Blackhelm - Dark Clouds of the Inferno; Religious Observance - Utter Discomfort; Uboa - The Origin of My Depression; Vexation - Journey Beyond Mortality
Best Hip Hop Act	Best Intercultural Act
**Sampa The Great**; Cool Out Sun; DRMNGNOW; Kaiit; Remi	**Përolas**; Cool Out Sun; Gordon Koang; Iaki Vallejo; The Public Opinion Afro Orchestra
Best Jazz Album	Best Reggae or Dance Hall Act
**Andrea Keller - Transients Vol. 1**; Adam Simmons - The Usefulness of Art; Adam Spiegl - Melancholiac; Spirograph Studies - Kindness, Not Courtesy; Various Artists - Sunny Side Up	**Echo Drama**; Jah Tung; Quashani Bahd; Shottaz; Yaw Faso
Best Rock/Punk Album	Best Soul, Funk, R'n'B and Gospel Album
**Tropical Fuck Storm – Braindrops**; Amyl and the Sniffers - Amyl and the Sniffers; HEXDEBT - Rule of Four; Stonefield - Bent; V - So Pure	**Allysha Joy - Acadie: Raw**; Clever Austin - Pareidolia; Cool Out Sun - Cool Out Sun; Laneous - Monstera Deliciosa; The Putbacks - The Putbacks

=== Other Awards ===
Voted by a select industry panel

Best Regional/Outer Suburban Venue (Over 50 Gigs a Year)	Best Regional/Outer Suburban Venue (Under 50 Gigs a Year)
**Theatre Royal, Castlemaine**; The Bridge Hotel, Castlemaine; Caravan Music Club, Malvern East; Sooki Lounge, Belgrave; Karova Lounge, Ballarat	**Meeniyan Town Hall, Meeniyan**; Ullumbura Theatre, Bendigo; Malt Shed, Wangaratta; Blues Train, Queenscliff; Halls Gap Hotel, Halls Gap
Best Regional Act/Outer Suburban Act	Best Festival
**The Teskey Brothers**; Stonefield; Kian; Maya Rose; The Kite Machine	**Golden Plains Festival**; Meredith Music Festival; Boogie; Gizzfest; Supersense
The Archie Roach Foundation Award for Emerging Talent
**Key Hoo**; Allara Briggs Pattison; DRMNGNOW; Kalyani & Isha; Robert K Champion
