= Tropical Fuck Storm =

Australian band

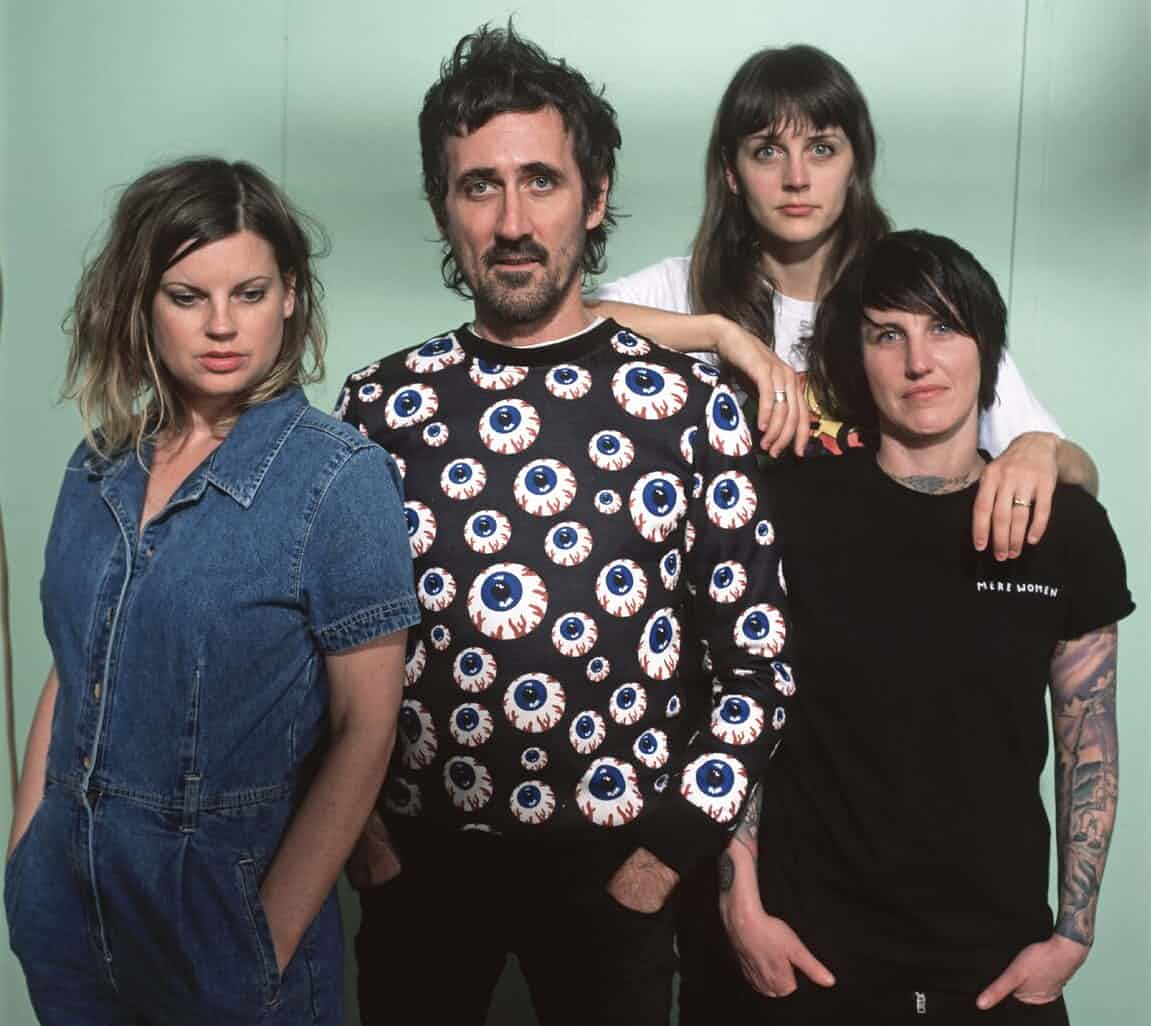
- Tropical Fuck Storm, 2018. Left to right: Fiona Kitschin, Gareth Liddiard, Erica Dunn, Lauren Hammel.

Background information
- Origin: Melbourne, Australia
- Genres: Art punk; experimental rock; noise rock; psychedelic rock; post-punk; punk blues; glam rock
- Years active: 2017–present
- Labels: Joyful Noise Recordings, Flightless, Tropical Fuck Storm Records, Fire
- Spinoff of: The Drones, High Tension, Mod Con, Harmony, Palm Springs
- Members: Gareth Liddiard; Fiona Kitschin; Lauren Hammel; Erica Dunn
- Website: TFS official website

Tropical Fuck Storm are an Australian rock band and supergroup from Melbourne, Victoria, formed by Gareth Liddiard and Fiona Kitschin from The Drones. Lauren Hammel, from the band High Tension, plays drums, and Erica Dunn, from the bands Mod Con, Harmony, and Palm Springs, plays guitars, keyboards, and other instruments. Their sound is characterised by elements of art punk, noise rock and experimental rock.

== Biography ==
=== 2016–2018: The Drones hiatus and A Laughing Death in Meatspace ===
Looking to reboot creatively, The Drones went on hiatus at the end of their tour supporting Feelin' Kinda Free in December 2016. The following year, Drones founder Gareth Liddiard and longtime bandmate Fiona Kitschin started writing material for a new project under the name for the record label they'd coined to self-release the last Drones album. They recruited Erica Dunn and Lauren Hammel during the summer of 2017, before embarking on an American tour. According to Dunn, "They just rang me up. Gareth and Fi were on loudspeaker like excited children. The pitch was 'Do you want to play guitar? We're just going to do some weird shit.' And I was like 'Okay, sure.' Then Gareth said 'We might go to America in the next month, are you free? And we have to write some songs.' Sure I'll clear my schedule. Hammer [Lauren Hammel] was a bit different though, because [Gareth] didn't know her and he had to take her to the pub."

They released a series of 7-inch singles later that autumn while on tour with Band of Horses and King Gizzard & the Lizard Wizard in the US. Their debut album, A Laughing Death in Meatspace, dropped in March 2018 and the band signed with Joyful Noise Recordings shortly thereafter. "The album title links "meatspace" – as Silicon Valley engineers derogatorily refer to the physical realm – with a neurodegenerative disorder called kuru, once found in the Fore people of Papua New Guinea. Men would eat the muscles of the deceased, while women and children ate the brains, thereby inheriting Creutzfeldt-Jakob disease and pot-holing their own grey matter to such an extent that they lost control of their emotions and laughed themselves to death." Videos for the songs "You Let My Tyres Down", "Rubber Bullies", "Soft Power" & "The Future of History" were released over 2017 and 2018.

The album – which saw the band utilise a range of obscure digital guitar effects, synthesisers, drum machines, and DAW software such as ProTools – received positive reviews for both its raw and unusual style as well as its lyricism. Greil Marcus wrote that the album makes "as fierce a band as" The Drones "seem austere" in comparison, writing that "the explosions in "Two Afternoons," "A Laughing Death," and "Rubber Bullies" are glorious and frightening, so big they don't feel quite real, but there's a story trying to climb out of the noise, carried by Liddiard's weariness, his uncynical fatalism, but shaped by the counter-vocals of Kitschin and Dunn." He concluded by saying that "you can feel as if this is what history sounds like as it's being written."

Contemporaries such as Thalia Zedek and Conan Neutron named it their favourite album of the year, with the latter calling it "[a]bsolutely powerful stuff. Great songs with incredible left turns. Moody, claustrophobic and staggeringly self aware, like a sentient computer raised on Bill Hicks comedy specials, Howard Zinn, Black MIrror [sic] and Twin Peaks. [...] It's a hell of a ride." In an interview in 2019, Britt Daniel mentioned his love for the band and called the album "[f]antastic. [Gareth Liddard's] lyrics are so good." DMA's ranked the track "You Let My Tyres Down" as their favourite song of the year for Triple J Hottest 100. In an interview with Pitchfork, New Weird author Jeff VanderMeer cited the album as one of many influences on his 2019 novel Dead Astronauts.

The album was longlisted for the Australian Music Prize of 2018, but failed to make the shortlist. The album was also nominated for "Best Rock/Punk Album" at the Music Victoria Awards of 2018, losing out to the self-titled album from Little Ugly Girls.

=== 2018–2019: Braindrops ===
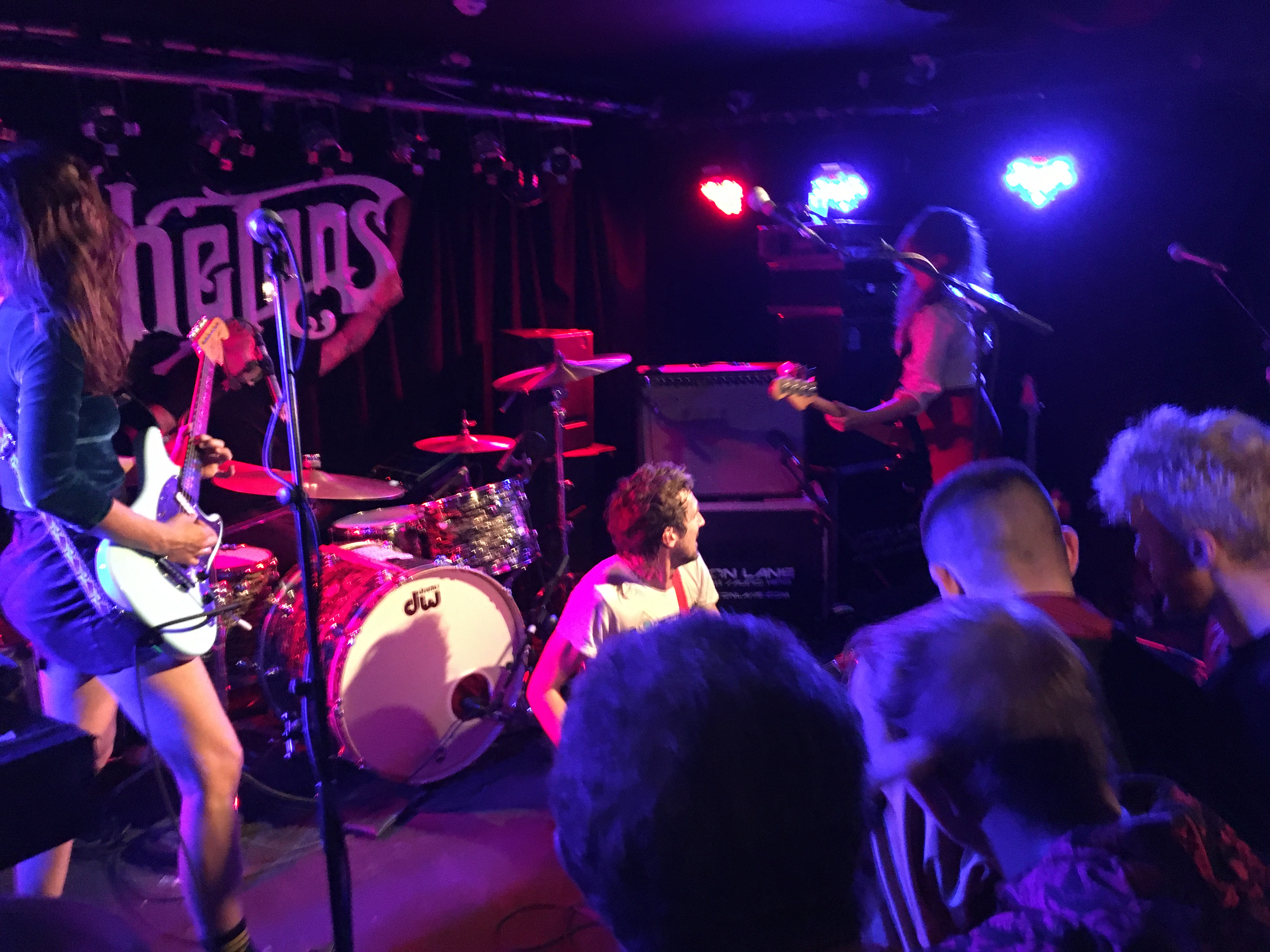
Performing in Dublin, 2019

Following the release of their debut, the band would go on to play a series of national and international dates in varying capacities, including a few dates opening for Modest Mouse (on their fall tour in October 2018) and King Gizzard and the Lizard Wizard (as a part of their Gizzfest event). On the 23rd of August that year, the band premiered the song "The Happiest Guy Around", which ended up being one half of a split single with Liars (who contributed the track "Total 3 Part Saga") as the 18th instalment of the LAMC (Less Artists More Condos) series of 7-inch singles curated by Famous Class Records; where "an established musician on the A-side" is paired "with one of the musician's favourite new artists on the B-side". The 7-inch was released on the 28th of September. Later that year, the band would also perform a live, pre-composed soundtrack to the Coen brothers' 2007 film No Country for Old Men at Arts Centre Melbourne as part of an event organised by Hear My Eyes.

On the 21st of January the following year, King Gizzard and the Lizard Wizard posted an image of them jamming with Liddiard in the foreground flipping the bird on their official Instagram account. This led some to speculate Liddiard's involvement with the band's new material "either as a guest or producer." On the 4th of March that year, Flightless announced that Tropical Fuck Storm had signed with them in Australia and New Zealand, and on that same day, the band premiered the video to "The Planet Of Straw Men", which would be the first single from their second album, set to be released "mid-2019" through Joyful Noise Recordings worldwide and Flightless Records in Australia and New Zealand. On the 17th of June, the band released the second single from their upcoming album, "Paradise"; the name of the album was also revealed to be Braindrops the same day, and its release date of August 23 was announced.

Treble magazine, in a review published on 12 August 2019, named Braindrops their "Album of the Week" praising the track "Paradise" as "a sickly mirage of an oasis—you can practically see the disspiating heat haze over Liddiard's trickling guitar riffs. It slowly escalates its way toward a furious climax, turning into one of the most explosive break-up songs in recent memory". The review concludes: "Tropical Fuck Storm invite the chaos, orchestrating it, manipulating it, delivering a piece of mangled and bruised art that sounds magnificent at its most frayed and fragmented. It's a weirdness that feels strangely assuring, even necessary." NARC Magazine gave the album a perfect score, writing that it "pretty much cements the Australians as one of the most vital acts on the planet right now." Exclaim! called it "a psychedelic rock opera occasionally dipping its toes in the stream of electro-punk. The result is equal parts harrowing and electrifying, surreal and far too familiar." According to Paste, "[l]istening to Braindrops feels like watching a sped-up timeline of rising sea levels and melting glaciers set to long-lost field recordings of maximalist noise-rock from the Outback. You're listening to a world falling apart." Braindrops, writes The Line of Best Fit, "is as cerebral and gut-level as its name implies, high-minded and high volume, a grand mess that isn't really a mess at all."

Despite their tepid review of the LP as a whole, which objects at length to the consistency of Liddiard's lyrical style and of the singer's conviction about psychic and cultural issues relating to the epistemological mass-extinction event of Fake News characteristic of media in the (at the time, still current) Trump administration, Pitchfork praises the outro track:

"Maria 63"...tells a fabricated story of Maria Orsic, a mysterious and, in Liddiard's estimation, entirely fake Nazi witch exalted by online conspiracists. In Tropical Fuck Storm's telling, Orsic is a trickster capable of duping even a keen-eyed Mossad agent...it's an engrossing, haunted fable, a way to link society's obsession with conspiracy to our basic needs for security and comfort."

In an interview with Konbini, Iggy Pop praised the title track of the album, simply calling it "a good fuck". Both Michael Feuerstack and Conan Neutron called it one of their favourite albums of the year, with the latter calling it "an utterly befuddling and "wrong" sounding record that is oh so "right". There isn't a clear monster single like “tyres” on this one, but the whole thing has a snakey, baked in the sun vibe that works its way into your subconscious."

=== 2020–2021: Deep States ===
On 15 March 2020, the band released "Suburbiopia", a song about suicide cults. "The lyrical trajectory started as a total shamoz", Liddiard said of the song. "We all started it at breakfast one morning. But at about 11am I took a shower and the concept came to me. I thought 'What if all those nutty cults with their fucked up suicide escape plans weren't wrong and everybody else accusing them of being insane was wrong? It's timely not 'cause of the cult thing but because it's probably a good time to leave the planet.'” The video which accompanied the song's release "features the band dressed in blonde wings à la The Family cult in Victoria and also samples recordings of Heavens Gate [sic] cult leader Marshall Applewhite and anime footage from the Aum Shinrikyo cult – famous for releasing sarin gas into the Tokyo subway in 1995." The 7" of the single was released on the 3rd of April, with a cover of "This Perfect Day" by The Saints - featuring Amy Taylor of Amyl and the Sniffers and Sean Powell of Surfbort - as its B-side.

On 12 August 2020, the band premiered a new version of the track "Legal Ghost": a "sprawling, experimental cut" originally recorded by Liddiard during the 90s for his Bong Odyssey project with former Drones member Rui Pereira. The song - which Liddiard considers to be the first he'd ever written of a "higher standard" “as far as songwriting goes” - deals with "mortality and early death, and its impact on a sense of place." It was released as a 7" single on 11 September, with a cover of Talking Heads' "Heaven" as its B-side.

On 23 June 2021, the single "G.A.F.F." ("Give a Fuck Fatigue") was released with its music video. Described as "a grungy and jagged fusion of funk-rock and hip-hop beats", the "nihilistic" song was called in its press release "an ode to the occasional dispassion brought about by the mandatory concern for every perceived injustice that happens, has happened and might yet happen that is being foisted upon the masses by super-yacht dwelling tech barons who monetise our indignation." This was accompanied by the announcement of the title, cover art & track list of the band's 3rd album Deep States. The fourth single, "New Romeo Agent", was released on July 20; its music video depicts the members of the band "performing as captives in an alien dive bar." The fifth and final single the band released from the album - on the 10th of August - was "Bumma Sanger", accompanied by a "surrealist" music video directed by Oscar O'Shea which features work by Tasmanian artist Georgia Lucy.Deep States was finally released on the 20th of August 2021.

=== 2022–2024: Satanic Slumber Party & other projects ===
On March 14, 2022, Tropical Fuck Storm released a joint EP with King Gizzard & the Lizard Wizard titled Satanic Slumber Party. The EP features three tracks, based on a larger jam session titled "Hat Jam" recorded by both bands during the recording sessions of King Gizzard's 2019 album Fishing for Fishies. The "Hat Jam" session was also adapted by King Gizzard for the first single of their 2022 album Omnium Gatherum, "The Dripping Tap". Alongside the release of the Satanic Slumber Party EP, a limited-edition 12" LP titled Hat Jam containing "The Dripping Tap" and Satanic Slumber Party was made available for pre-order through both bands' online stores. Later that summer, they put out the critically acclaimed Moonburn EP, including a cover of "Ann" by The Stooges . A second edition of the album, including a sprawling interpretation of Hendrix as the first track "1983" was released shortly thereafter under the title Submersive Behavior..

A Tropical Fuck Storm poster and (fellow Joyful Noise Recordings artist) No Joy LP made a brief cameo appearance in the 2022 Jordan Peele film, Nope.

On 5 January 2023, the band announced that it would be cancelling all tour dates outside Australia for the rest of the year to accommodate Kitschin's stage three breast cancer diagnosis.

Gareth Liddiard's side-project Springtime S/T had been released in 2021 followed by the Night Raver EP, and his solo albums Strange Tourist and the Bootlicker Series 2006-2016 were re-released during this caesura in the Tropical Fuck Storm project in combination with other efforts supporting Fiona's recovery. With successful treatment, the band scheduled tour dates for spring and summer 2024 and began tracking their next record.

=== 2025–present: Fairyland Codex ===
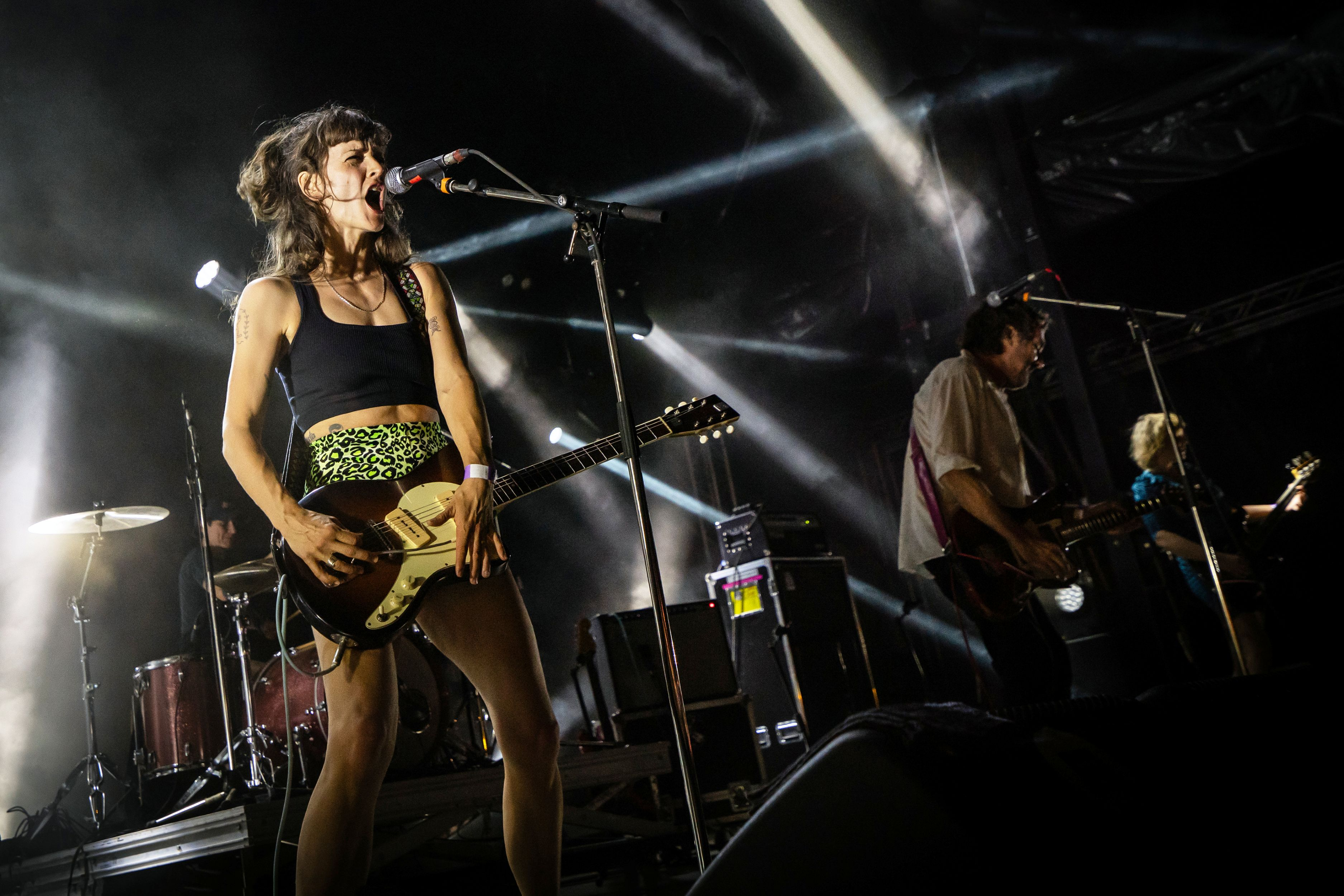
Tropical Fuck Storm at La Route du Rock 2025.

On 18 February 2025, in announcing their partnership with Fire Records and a US tour with Bill Orcutt, the band released "Goon Show" as a teaser for their upcoming album. This was succeeded by "Bloodsport", "Dunning Kruger's Loser Cruiser", and "Teeth Marché".

"Fairyland Codex" was released 20 June 2025. The record was seen by many as a return to form after the sprawling "Deep States" several years prior, with less fractured, more straightforward songwriting and artwork evoking the band's debut. The album also featured Dunn in a more prominent role, providing unaccompanied lead vocals on three of its ten songs.

== Members ==
- Gareth Liddiard – lead vocals, guitar
- Fiona Kitschin – bass guitar, backing and occasional lead vocals
- Erica Dunn – guitar, keyboards, synthesiser, backing and occasional lead vocals
- Lauren Hammel – drums, programming

== Discography ==
=== Studio albums ===
Title	Details	Peak chart positions
Title	Details	AUS
A Laughing Death in Meatspace	Released: 4 May 2018; Label: Tropical Fuck Storm Records, Mistletone (MIST086); Format: CD, digital download, LP, streaming	25
Braindrops	Released: 23 August 2019; Label: Flightless (FLT-054); Format: CD, digital download, LP, streaming	10
Deep States	Released: 20 August 2021; Label: Tropical Fuck Storm, Joyful Noise (JNR371); Format: Digital download, LP, streaming	7
Fairyland Codex	Released: 20 June 2025; Label: Fire Records; Format: Digital download, LP, streaming	—

=== Live albums ===
Title	Details
Inflatable Graveyard	Released: 27 September 2024; Label: Three Lobed Recordings; Format: digital download, LP, streaming; Recorded: October 2022

=== EPs ===
Title	Details
Satanic Slumber Party (with King Gizzard & the Lizard Wizard)	Released: 14 March 2022; Label: Joyful Noise; Format: EP, digital download, LP, streaming
Goody Goody Gumdrops	Released: 30 July 2022; Label: Joyful Noise; Format: LP, digital download, streaming
Moonburn	Released: 26 August 2022; Label: Joyful Noise; Format: Cassette, digital download, streaming
Submersive Behaviour	Released: 3 February 2023; Label: Joyful Noise; Format: LP, digital download, streaming

=== Singles ===
Title	Year	Album
"Chameleon Paint" b/w "Mansion Family"	2017	A Laughing Death in Meatspace
"Soft Power" b/w "Lose the Baby"	2017	A Laughing Death in Meatspace
"You Let My Tyres Down" b/w "Back to the Wall"	2018	A Laughing Death in Meatspace
"Rubber Bullies" b/w "Stayin' Alive"	2018	A Laughing Death in Meatspace
"The Planet of Straw Men"	2019	Braindrops
"Can't Stop"	2019	non-album single
"Paradise"	2019	Braindrops
"Who's My Eugene?"	2019	Braindrops
"Braindrops"	2019	Braindrops
"Suburbiopia" b/w "This Perfect Day"	2020	Deep States
"Legal Ghost" b/w "Heaven"	2020	Deep States
"G.A.F.F."	2021	Deep States
"New Romeo Agent"	2021	Deep States
"Bumma Sanger"	2021	Deep States
"Ann"	2022	Moonburn EP
"1983"	2023	non album single
"Goon Show"	2025	Fairyland Codex
"Bloodsport"	2025	Fairyland Codex
"Dunning Kruger's Loser Cruiser"	2025	Fairyland Codex
"Teeth Marché"	2025	Fairyland Codex

== Awards and nominations ==
=== APRA Awards ===
The APRA Awards are presented annually from 1982 by the Australasian Performing Right Association (APRA), "honouring composers and songwriters".

Year	Nominee / work	Award	Result	Ref.
2019	"Paradise" by Tropical Fuck Storm (Erica Dunn / Gareth Liddiard / Fiona Kitchin / Lauren Hammel)	Song of the Year	Shortlisted	
2026	"Goon Show" by Tropical Fuck Storm (Erica Dunn / Gareth Liddiard / Fiona Kitchin / Lauren Hammel)	Song of the Year	Shortlisted	

=== Australian Music Prize ===
The Australian Music Prize (the AMP) is an annual award of $50,000 given to an Australian band or solo artist in recognition of the merit of an album released during the year of award. It commenced in 2005.

Year	Nominee / work	Award	Result	Ref.
2025	Fairyland Codex	Australian Music Prize	Nominated	

=== ARIA Music Awards ===
The ARIA Music Awards is an annual ceremony presented by Australian Recording Industry Association (ARIA), which recognise excellence, innovation, and achievement across all genres of the music of Australia. They commenced in 1987.

Year	Nominee / work	Award	Result	Ref.
2021	Deep States	Best Hard Rock or Heavy Metal Album	Won	

=== Music Victoria Awards ===
The Music Victoria Awards, are an annual awards night celebrating Victorian music. They commenced in 2005 (although nominee and winners are unknown from 2005 to 2012).

Year	Nominee / work	Award	Result
2018	A Laughing Death in Meatspace	Best Rock/Punk Album	Nominated
2018	themselves	Best Band	Nominated
2018	Erica Dunn	Best Female Musician	Nominated
2018	Gareth Liddiard	Best Male Musician	Nominated
2019	Braindrops	Best Rock/Punk Album	Won
2019	themselves	Best Band	Nominated
2019	themselves	Best Live Act	Nominated
2019	Erica Dunn	Best Female Musician	Won
2019	Gareth Liddiard	Best Male Musician	Nominated
2020	Erica Dunn	Best Musician	Nominated
2020	Gareth Liddiard	Best Musician	Nominated
2021	Erica Dunn	Best Musician	Nominated

=== National Live Music Awards ===
The National Live Music Awards (NLMAs) are a broad recognition of Australia's diverse live industry, celebrating the success of the Australian live scene. The awards commenced in 2016.

Year	Nominee / work	Award	Result
2018	Themselves	Best New Act	Won
2018	Themselves	Live Hard Rock Act of the Year	Won
2018	Gareth Liddiard (Tropical Fuck Storm)	Live Guitarist of the Year	Won
2018	Erica Dunn (Tropical Fuck Storm)	Live Instrumentalist of the Year	Nominated
2019	Lauren Hammel (Tropical Fuck Storm)	Live Drummer of the Year	Won
2019	Erica Dunn (Tropical Fuck Storm)	Live Guitarist of the Year	Won
2020	Themselves	Live Act of the Year	Nominated
2020	Fiona Kitschin (Tropical Fuck Storm)	Live Bassist of the Year	Nominated
