= Gordon Koang =

South-Sudanese musician

- Born: Nile Valley, South Sudan
- Genre: African Pop
- Instrument: Thom
- Label: Music in Exile

Gordon Koang is a blind South Sudanese musician based in Australia. He is known in South Sudan as the country's "King of Music". Koang was already an internationally touring musician and a household name in his own country when he was forced to flee South Sudan for Uganda and then Australia. Since then, he has played and produced music in Australia and advocated for refugees. He was awarded permanent residency in Australia in 2019.

Koang's second studio album, Community, was released on 11 November 2022.

== Biography ==
Koang was born in the Nile Valley in what is now South Sudan. Koang was born blind and had few job options, but a family member introduced him to the Thom in an attempt to help him feel less lonely while his family was at work. He started his musical career by playing in church in his hometown of Nasir and, in the 1990s, began writing his own music to play in the streets of Juba for crowds. He became a household name in his country, having released ten albums, touring around the world, and generating a significant following on YouTube.

Koang emigrated to Australia in 2012.

In 2013, he was touring in Canada and returned to find South Sudan in the beginnings of a tribally based civil war. He found his home destroyed and his bank account emptied by looters. As members of the Nuer ethnic group, Koang, his wife, and their children were in danger from members of the Dinka ethnic group, and fled to Uganda. Koang then went to Australia, along with his cousin and fellow musician Paul Biel. They began the Australian asylum process, believing it would be a short process and their families would be able to join them soon. This, however, was not the case.

Although Koang and Biel his cousin played live music around Australia, for some time before producing any new music, but then connected with Music in Exile, a non-profit organisation which helped refugee musicians in Australia. They released their eleventh album, Unity, in Australia. It was described as "not only a prayer for reunification with his own family – whom he hopes will be granted permission to join him soon – but also a plea on behalf of refugees everywhere" and that although it touches "upon some of the darkest elements of humanity [it] ultimately points the listener in the direction of hope".

Koang was awarded permanent residency in Australia in August 2019 and submitted paperwork to have their families join them.

== Music career ==
Koang sings in English, Arabic and Nuer, and plays a traditional Nuer stringed instrument called the tom (also spelled toom, thom, or thoom.)

His influences range from Mohammed Wardi to Rihanna.

== Discography ==
=== Albums ===
List of albums, with selected details
Title	Details
Unity	Released: August 2020; Format: CD, LP, digital; Label: Music In Exile (MIE-011)
Community	Scheduled: 11 November 2022; Format: CD, digital; Label: Music In Exile

== Awards and nominations ==
=== Australian Music Prize ===
The Australian Music Prize (the AMP) is an annual award of $30,000 given to an Australian band or solo artist in recognition of the merit of an album released during the year of award. They commenced in 2005.

Year	Nominee / work	Award	Result
Australian Music Prize 2020	Unity	Album of the Year	Nominated

=== Music Victoria Awards ===
The Music Victoria Awards, are an annual awards night celebrating Victorian music. They commenced in 2005.

Year	Nominee / work	Award	Result	Ref.
2019	"Stand Up (Clap Your Hands)"	Best Song	Nominated	
2019	Gordon Koang	Best Male Musician	Nominated	
2019	Gordon Koang	Best Solo Artist	Nominated	
2019	Gordon Koang	Breakthrough Victorian Act	Nominated	
2019	Gordon Koang	Best Intercultural Act	Nominated	
2020	Gordon Koang	Best Musician	Nominated	
2020	Gordon Koang	Best Solo Act	Nominated	
2020	Gordon Koang	Best Live Act	Nominated	
2021	Unity	Best Victorian Album	Nominated	
2021	Gordon Koang	Best Solo Artist	Nominated	
2021	Gordon Koang	Arts Access Amplify Award (for Deaf and Disabled acts)	Nominated	
