= Satanic Slumber Party =

2022 EP

EP by King Gizzard & the Lizard Wizard + Tropical Fuck Storm
- Released: March 14, 2022
- Length: 18:51
- Label: Joyful Noise Recordings

Tropical Fuck Storm chronology
Deep States (2021)	Satanic Slumber Party (2022)

King Gizzard and the Lizard Wizard chronology
Made in Timeland (2022)	Satanic Slumber Party (2022)	Omnium Gatherum (2022)

Alternative cover
- Cover of the Hat Jam LP.

Satanic Slumber Party is a collaborative EP by Australian-rock bands Tropical Fuck Storm and King Gizzard & the Lizard Wizard, released on March 14, 2022 as a surprise release. The second track on the album, "Midnight in Sodom" had a music video released in promotion of the EP alongside the release of the record. It was directed by Nina Renee and Tropical Fuck Storm. The album was released digitally, and as a 7" EP. A limited edition 12" would be released titled "Hat Jam" that featured the EP and "The Dripping Tap". The cover art was made by Satomi Matsuzaki of the band Deerhoof. NME has described the EP as having influence from "Noise pop".

== Background ==
According to Tropical Fuck Storm bassist Fiona Kitschin, King Gizzard and the Lizard Wizard were recording their fourteenth studio album, Fishing for Fishies at a house the band owned. One day while they were recording the album, the band and Tropical Fuck Storm all wore hats and recorded a jam called "Hat Jam". King Gizzard would use the jam as a basis for their 2022 song "The Dripping Tap", while Tropical Fuck Storm turned it into Satanic Slumber Party. The EP was first teased in August 2021, when Gareth Liddiard announced that a collaboration between the two bands would be on the way on Reddit. According to the Bandcamp description, the fictional background for the EP is:

"Somewhere along a frayed thread of time, a King Gizz and a Tropical Fuck Storm convened under the cloak of night for a slumber party of the satanic persuasion…Pumped full of booze and adrenaline, two of psych-rock’s most powerful joined forces for a 20-minute “Hatjam” chockfull of sax skronks, brick-heavy distortion, and punchy riffs. Satanic Slumber Party arrives just in time for your possessed pleasure."

Fiona Kitschin has described the EP as “four guitars, three drummers, two synths, bass, harmonica, electronic sax and lots of singers and silliness. It’s like ‘Love Shack’ by the B-52’s except it’s evil.”

== Track listing ==
All tracks are written by Tropical Fuck Storm, Stu Mackenzie, Ambrose Kenny-Smith, Joey Walker, Cook Craig, Michael Cavanagh.

Satanic Slumber Party track listing
No.	Title	Length
1.	"Satanic Slumber Party Part 1 (The Chairman's Portrait)"	0:54
2.	"Satanic Slumber Party Part 2 (Midnight in Sodom)"	5:42
3.	"Satanic Slumber Party Part 3 (Hoof and Horn)"	12:14
Total length:		18:51

Hat Jam LP track listing
No.	Title	Length
1.	"The Dripping Tap"	18:17
2.	"Satanic Slumber Party"	18:51
Total length:		37:08

== Personnel ==
Musicians

Performed by Tropical Fuck Storm and King Gizzard & the Lizard Wizard

Technical

- Gareth Liddiard – recording, mixing
- Mike Deslandes – mixing
- Lachlan Carrick – mastering

Design

- Satomi Matsuzaki – cover art
- Ryan Hover – design

== Charts ==
Chart performance for Satanic Slumber Party
Chart (2022)	Peak position
UK Singles Sales Chart (OCC)	77
