= Deep States =

Studio album by Tropical Fuck Storm
- Released: 20 August 2021
- Recorded: 2020–2021
- Studios: Studious Studios (Nagambie, Victoria)
- Genres: Art rock; experimental rock; noise rock; psychedelic rock; krautrock
- Length: 50:31
- Labels: Joyful Noise; TFS Records
- Producers: Gareth Liddiard; Mike Deslandes

Tropical Fuck Storm chronology
Braindrops (2019)	Deep States (2021)	Satanic Slumber Party (2022)

Singles from Deep States
- 1. "Suburbiopia" Released: 3 April 2020; 2. "Legal Ghost" Released: 20 August 2020; 3. "G.A.F.F." Released: 23 June 2021; 4. "New Romeo Agent" Released: 20 July 2021; 5. "Bumma Sanger" Released: 10 August 2021

Deep States is the third studio album by Australian group Tropical Fuck Storm. It was released on 20 August 2021 through Joyful Noise Recordings. Recorded during the COVID-19 pandemic, the recording process for the album was unconventional and involved heavy experimentation. The music features a range of diverse influences and has been variously labelled as art rock, noise rock and psychedelic rock. Lyrically, the album deals with the social and emotional impact of the pandemic, with many songs also diving into subjects such as conspiracy theories, social media polarization, corruption, death and occasionally even feature science fiction themes.

Deep States was released on 20 August 2021 to positive critical reviews, debuting at #7 on the ARIA Charts – the band's highest placement thus far. At the 2021 ARIA Music Awards, the album won the award for Best Hard Rock or Heavy Metal Album.

== Background ==
During the first six months of the pandemic – which began a few months after the release of their second album Braindrops and a series of promotional tours through Australia, North America and Europe – lead singer/guitarist Gareth Liddiard noted that he was in "a musical drought, with a sense of nihilism seeping through as a result of the state of the world. Eventually though, the music began to flow again, with songs related to what we were all feeling and seeing coming to a head." The pandemic had also forced the band to cancel a spring North American tour that they'd announced in January 2020. The cancellation of the tour was announced weeks before its scheduled commencement through an Instagram post where they promised that they would instead be working on new material.

Two days after announcing the tour's cancellation, on 15 March 2020, the band released "Suburbiopia". The video which accompanied the song's release "features the band dressed in blonde wings à la The Family cult in Victoria and also samples recordings of Heavens Gate [sic] cult leader Marshall Applewhite and anime footage from the Aum Shinrikyo cult – famous for releasing sarin gas into the Tokyo subway in 1995." The 7" of the single was released on 3 April, with a cover of "This Perfect Day" by The Saints – featuring Amy Taylor of Amyl and the Sniffers and Sean Powell of Surfbort – as its B-side. On 12 August 2020, the band premiered a new version of the track "Legal Ghost": a "sprawling, experimental cut" originally recorded by Liddiard during the 1990s for his Bong Odyssey project with former Drones member Rui Pereira. It was released as a 7" single on 11 September, with a cover of Talking Heads' "Heaven" as its B-side. The band revealed that the track would feature on their upcoming album.

== Recording ==
The album was recorded at Liddiard and Kitschin's home in the town of Nagambie, Victoria. The period consisted of the band "slinging sausages onto the barbeque, swimming and spending time outdoors, then coming together to jam together for hours, seeing what came of it." According to guitarist/vocalist Erica Dunn:

For this record, because of 2020 being what it was, most of the beds for the tracks were Gaz [Gareth] trawling through recordings that we’d done and fucked up, things in the hard drive. He was really researching to find cool stuff that we’d done, or that he’d put down and stored away. So he came up with the rhythm sequence, or synths as the start for the tracks but from there, anything goes.

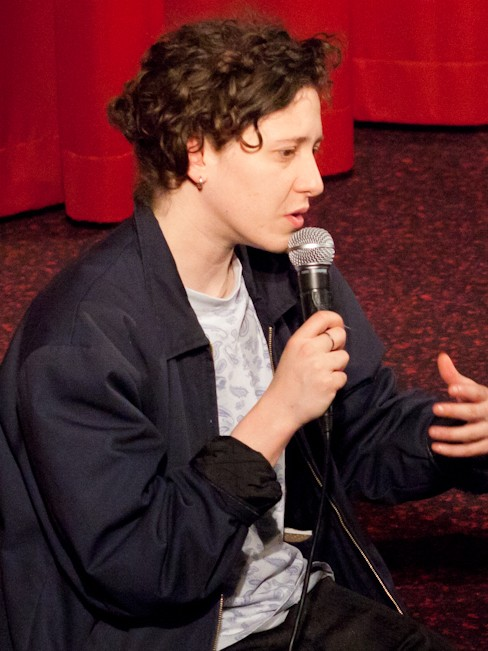
Liddiard has cited the production work of Mica Levi (pictured here at the Crossing Europe Film Festival in Linz, 2014) as being influential on the album's sound.

Like the band's previous albums, the album features "heaps of weird effect pedals" according to Liddiard: "Sometimes I buy some idiot’s idea of a fuzz pedal on Etsy, anything that’s not store-bought. All the recording is Transformer-based, so we tend to drive the microphones pretty hard. I like the old Muscle Shoals sounds like Booker T, and they’re recording in quite hot and if the singer is loud, it distorts. I find that more lively than a well-rendered record." Dunn recalled that both she and Liddiard "played through Golden Tones amp [...] This beautiful old tube amp, then put it through these cooked little speaker units. I used a Jon Shub [DC-01] guitar through a pretty basic setup. It was made in 2015 and he had a series of this kind of shape, it originally had P-90 pickups, these big soap-bar pickups, but I got him to put some humbuckers in to create less of a buzz. It’s really heavy, solid and good, with a good, thick neck." Dunn herself used "a Fender Mustang [...] which I could just chuck around, and it was a sound that’s really different to Gaz’s" in addition to "a couple of distortions, a TC Electronic Shaker, the ‘seasick pedal’ that makes notes pitch shift, a cheaper version of a slow hand pedal, a great reverb pedal which was made for us by Veternik, a Dutch small pedal company that found us in Amsterdam. For me, the Electro-Harmonix Soul Food pulls a lot of feedback without going into fuzzy territory, it carries a sound across. I used the MXR Blue Box – which is really connected with the Rowland S. Howard sound – for some mega-divebomb, feedback stuff." Liddiard, on the other hand, played two Fender Jaguars that are both "Gibson SGs on the inside [...] I like that Jimmy Page, AC/DC thing using Gibson humbuckers, then if you need extra drive you could stick it through a RAT pedal with a hint of drive." Many of the drum tracks on the album were also created through unconventional means: for example, Liddiard recalled that the drums on "G.A.F.F." "are Ham [Lauren Hammel] playing with a drum machine on her phone, doing it with her fingers too, rather than just letting it run on some sort of sequencer."

=== Musical influences ===
Much like the band's previous albums, Deep States came together from a range of eclectic influences. According to Liddiard: "It’s a history of listening to all sorts of shit. Erica [...] was a DJ on PBS for years, her show was pretty eclectic, she knows all sorts of stuff from Pop music to Mexican Mariachi music to Jazz, so she’s really knowledgeable." "It’s endless", he continues, "If you run out of ideas in the moment, but then just write things like ‘Hungarian Folk Music’ into Spotify, all of a sudden, you’ve just got all this shit that’s come at you from an angle you never knew existed. You can come and use it, you can take from things and then recycle them into your stuff, it gives it more life." Liddiard has also named the music of Tirzah – particularly Mica Levi's production work on her releases – as being influential on him when recording the album. On 4 September 2021, the band were asked to guest programme an episode for ABC's Rage; their "favourite music clips from past years plus the ones they channelled for their [...] third album" included those from Genesis Owusu, Rihanna, Lil Nas X, Madonna, Dolly Parton, Laura Jean, Le Tigre, Dirty Three, Xylouris White, Laughing Clowns, The Jesus Lizard, Fugazi and many others.

== Content ==
Deep States is heavily influenced by the impact of COVID-19 during 2020 and 2021. Mike LaSuer of Flood Magazine describes it as "a verbose diatribe on the never-ending cycle that is the irresponsible media that fuels our stupidity, which in turn fuels the irresponsible media, all undergirded by queasy instrumentals continuing on the band’s path to (literally, in this case) invert summer bangers and discover experimental procedures [...] for distancing themselves from their aggressive hard-rock origins." "Not so much melding psychedelia, hip-hop, noise punk, gutbucket blues and some sort of art music from another planet as throwing elements of each against the wall and utilizing what sticks," writes Michael Toland for The Big Takeover, "[the band] channel a year of frustration, boredom, fear and rage into a set of savagely sarcastic songs."

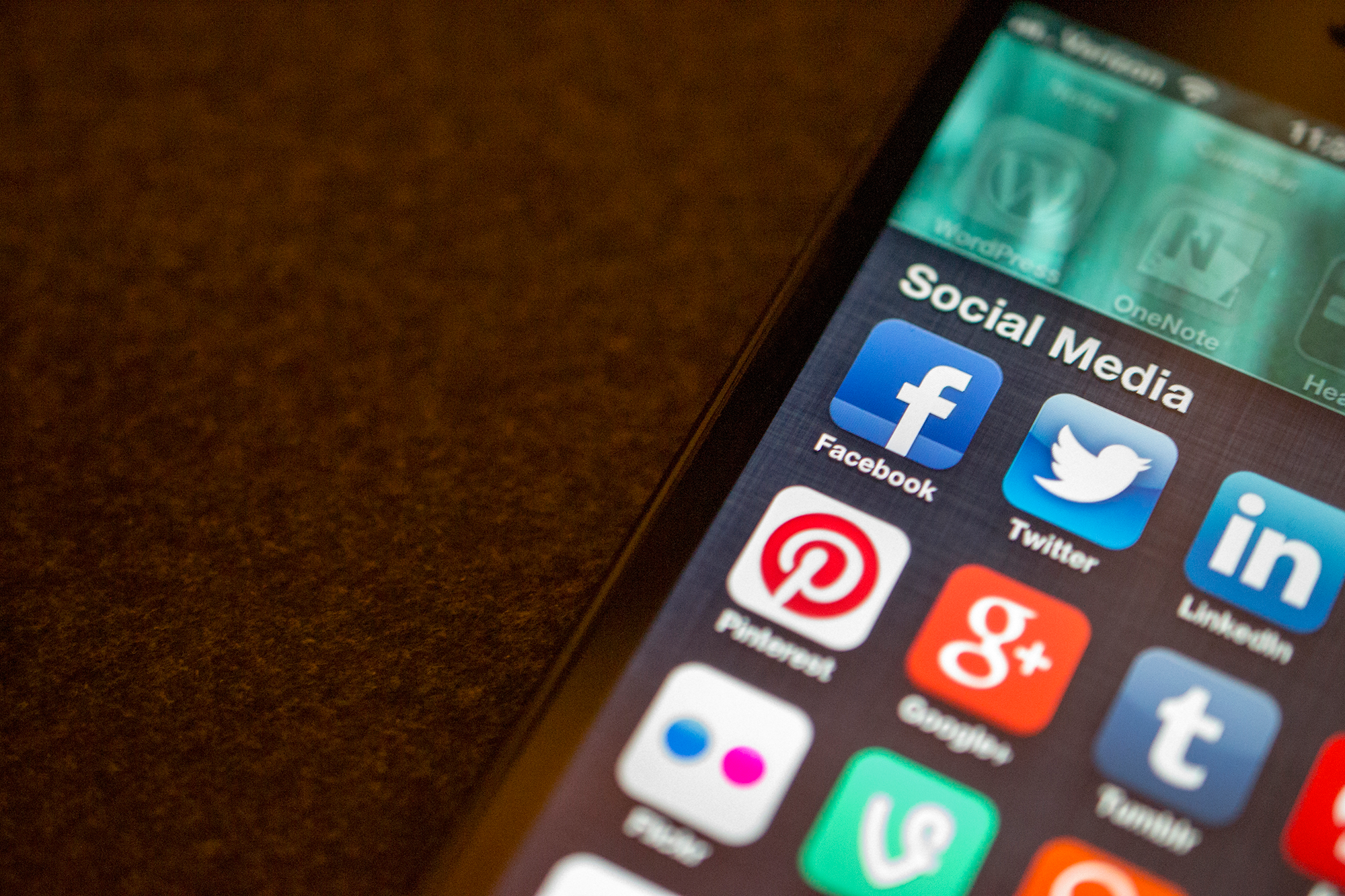
The track "G.A.F.F." deals with social media-fuelled compassion fade.

The opening track "The Greatest Story Ever Told" imagines Jesus coming back to life "but he’s here to say "You don’t need me anymore because I’ve had a look on my iPhone and you’re all way more sanctimonious than I ever was—and plus, none of you really ever listened to me anyway so bye bye."" According to Liam Martin of AllMusic, the song "follows the bombastic standard set by the openers on their previous albums. The massive chorus is relatively listener-friendly". "G.A.F.F" ("Give A Fuck Fatigue") was described as "a grungy and jagged fusion of funk-rock and hip-hop beats", the "nihilistic" song called by the band in its single press release "an ode to the occasional dispassion brought about by the mandatory concern for every perceived injustice that happens, has happened and might yet happen that is being foisted upon the masses by super-yacht dwelling tech barons who monetize our indignation." "Blue Beam Baby" – named after the Project Blue Beam conspiracy theory – revolves around the killing of Ashli Babbitt; "I kind of felt sorry for her," Liddiard said, "but to be honest, she was kicking a hornet's nest when she climbed through that broken window in that door in the Capitol Building. A hornet's nest that happened to be pointing a gun at her. So it's a song about morons believing shit posted on dodgy websites by that Jim Watkins guy and his idiot son who are "Q"." "Suburbiopia" is a song about suicide cults, whose title – an "ironic" portmanteau of the words "suburban" and "utopia" – was coined by Dunn. "The lyrical trajectory started as a total shamoz", Liddiard said of the song. "We all started it at breakfast one morning. But at about 11am I took a shower and the concept came to me. I thought 'What if all those nutty cults with their fucked up suicide escape plans weren’t wrong and everybody else accusing them of being insane was wrong? It’s timely not 'cause of the cult thing but because it’s probably a good time to leave the planet.'" "Bumma Sanger" (a spoonerised form of the term "summer banger") was described by Liddiard as a song "about the pandemic and it’s [sic] travel restrictions. You can’t go interstate or overseas but you can fly interstellar. So me and the band go on holiday and drink piss on a tropical beach in Uranus. Or somewhere similar."

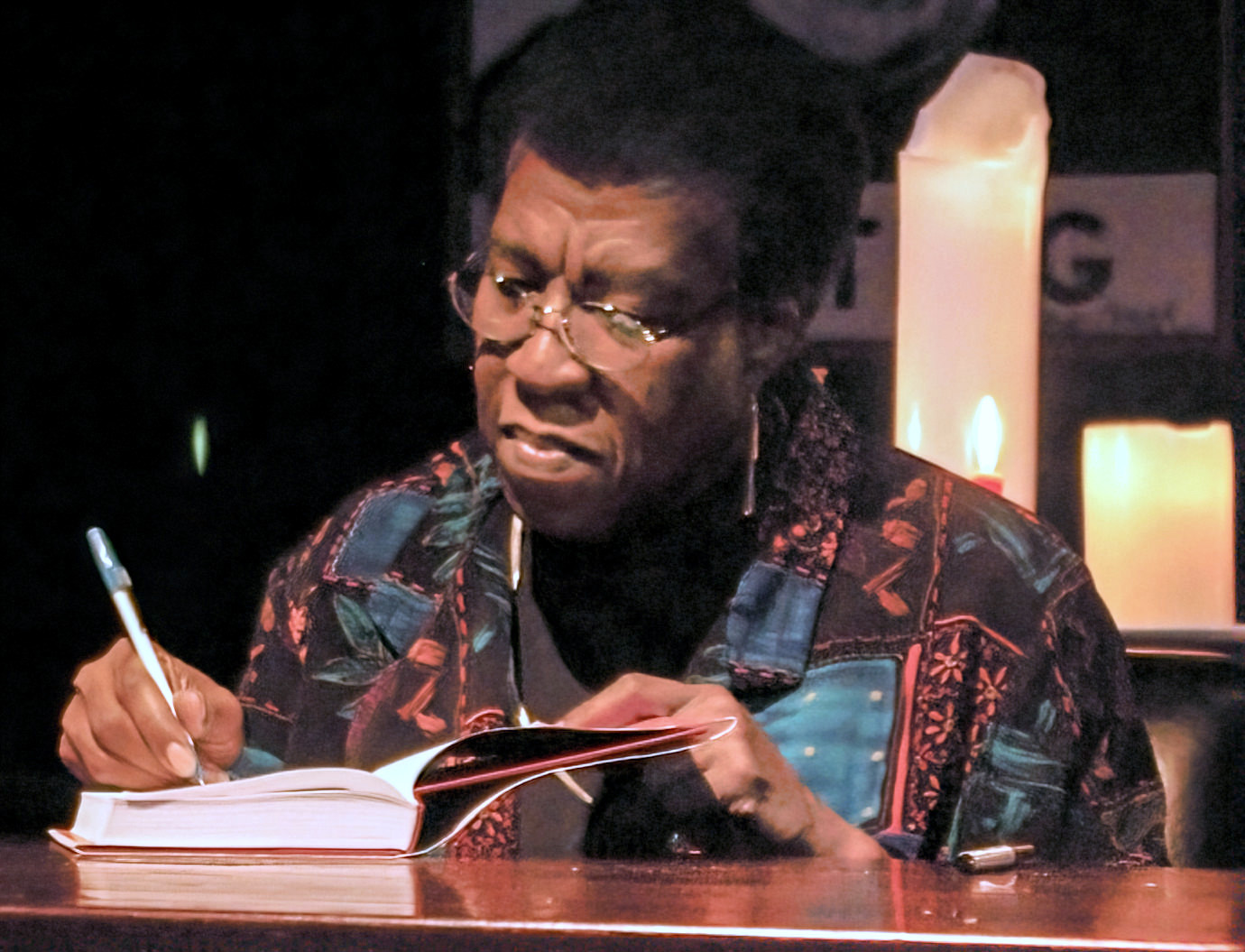
The track "New Romeo Agent" was conceived lyrically as a continuation of the short story "Amnesty" by Octavia E. Butler (pictured here in October 2005).

"The Donkey" is written from the perspective of a donkey left behind by Noah's Ark. The song has been found to reach "back to the days of the Drones’ feedback epics for a clamorous take on border crossings". It was inspired by a baby donkey that the band would go to visit on a field near their studio whilst recording the album during 2020. "Reporting of a Failed Campaign" was called by Liddiard "a pretend Bob Dylan epic about people like Jeffery Epstein and Murdoch and the media whores from Fox News. But in a more international setting. How they all end up turning on each other and (hopefully) ruining each other." The song, described as "an absolute nightmare" by Sputnikmusic staff reviewer MiloRuggles, was partially inspired by the Traveling Wilburys song "Tweeter and the Monkey Man". "New Romeo Agent", written and sung by Erica Dunn, was conceived lyrically as a continuation of the Octavia E. Butler short story "Amnesty". The song's intro features recordings of "Stassi agents [sic] radioing each other in the field" and utilizes an "old Casio keyboard". It has been described as "beautiful respite [...] from the album's chaos" that "continue[s] down a more ponderous path". "Legal Ghost" – a song that Liddiard considers to be the first he'd ever written of a "higher standard" "as far as songwriting goes" – deals with "mortality and early death, and its impact on a sense of place." The "existentially enigmatic" song has been called "an absolute highlight for the record. A really strong groove underpins the track, and anthemic guitar lines give it weight and a sense of class." The closing instrumental, "The Confinement of Quarks", is "a warped slice of '80s nostalgia that bleeds warmth and melancholy in equal measure, making for a wistful closer." The opening of the track consists of a sample of Holly Near's "Come Smile With Us" and was itself salvaged by Liddiard from "the spare parts department [...] we [...] thought it had that heroically epic yet cheap and nasty sound that the theme from the original Terminator films had. So we threw some bells and whistles on it and stuck it at the end of our movie where the credits would roll."

== Release ==
On 23 June 2021, the third single "G.A.F.F." was released with its music video. Its release was accompanied by the announcement of the title, cover art & track list of the album. The fourth single, "New Romeo Agent", was released on 20 July; its music video depicts the members of the band "performing as captives in an alien dive bar." The fifth and final single the band released from the album – on 10 August – was "Bumma Sanger", accompanied by a "surrealist" music video directed by Oscar O'Shea which features work by Tasmanian artist Georgia Lucy. Deep States was finally released on 20 August 2021 in vinyl, CD, cassette and digital download versions.

=== Touring postponement ===
Weeks after announcing the title and release date of Deep States, the band announced a national tour in support of the album that was scheduled to commence on 21 August 2021 (the day after the album's release) and end on 26 September. The 9-date tour, which included performances in cities such as Melbourne, Sydney, Brisbane and Perth, has thus far been postponed twice due to lockdown travel restrictions in Australia: the first one was announced two days before its scheduled commencement and saw it being pushed back to 9 September; the second one was announced in mid-October after a series of date cancellations, with the tour currently set to commence on 7 January and end on 12 February 2022.

=== Cover ===
Joe Becker, who had created the cover art for both their previous albums, was also credited with the cover art for Deep States.

== Reception ==
=== Critical ===
Professional ratings
Aggregate scores
Source	Rating
AnyDecentMusic?	6.6/10
Metacritic	79/100
Review scores
Source	Rating
AllMusic	4/5 stars
Beats Per Minute	75%
DIY	3/5 stars
Kerrang!	4/5 stars
The Line of Best Fit	3/10
Louder	4/5 stars
Mojo	4/5 stars
Sputnikmusic	4.5/5 stars
The Sydney Morning Herald	4/5 stars
Uncut	8/10

The album currently holds a Metacritic score of 79 based on 9 reviews, indicating "[g]enerally favorable reviews". MiloRuggles praised the album as "a series of meticulously choreographed explosions, and sifting through the detritus for specific highlights presents a unique challenge in that as soon as you pick one thing up to look at, something else catches your attention." "Deep States" he writes, "avoids stuffy intellectualism or political buzz words in its approximation of modern woe, and becomes an engrossing distillation of just how fucking bizarre the world is as a result." Liam Martin wrote that the album "encompasses more than isolation-induced insanity, the interdimensional prism through which their sound is filtered reflects a feeling of powerlessness in the face of an ever stranger, information-overloaded reality. As with their last album, it can often be hard to discern exactly what is going on within the music, as it squeals and squirms, sometimes on the edge of perception, in a marvelously disjointed fashion. Yet somehow it doesn't fall to pieces, upholding at least a semblance of cohesion. In fact, the second half contains some of their most straightforward songwriting, acting as an equally brilliant counterweight to their more chaotic side." Annie Toller of The Sydney Morning Herald described it as "a Pynchon-esque whirlpool, the band sucked into a state of apathy and mayhem – but at least they make it sound fun." Beats Per Minute's Aleksandr Smirnov even described it as "one of the grimmest records of the pandemic era."

Deep States has received unfavourable reviews as well. Elvis Thrilwell of DIY called the album "a difficult listen at times", its songs described as "merciless barrages of ear-splitting shreds; crunching, skin-crawling rhythms that bore into the skull’s fragile surfaces; to top it all off, a lyrical parade of grimly ghoulish imagery, tackling, without censure, the psychological fall-out of the pandemic." A negative review came from Robin Ferris of The Line of Best Fit, who panned the album as "pure chaos" (as opposed to the "organised chaos" of their previous albums) and described its songs as "early ‘70s Can being performed by 6-year-olds. Any sense of wacky, lo-fi appeal, or krautrock-ian spectacle has been quashed by Gareth Liddiard’s unintelligible, deep-fried vocal delivery and some very distracting production choices." They conclude: "[N]othing about Deep States feels authentically trippy, authentically dark or authentically weird. Near-on every element feels both forced and misguided, be it the performances, songwriting or the production."

=== Accolades ===
Accolades for Deep States
Publication	Country	Accolade	Rank
Double J	Australia	The 50 best albums of 2021	30
Junkee	Australia	The Best Albums Of 2021	-
NME	UK	The 25 best Australian albums of 2021	11

=== Awards and nominations ===
The album was nominated for and eventually received the Best Hard Rock or Heavy Metal Album award at the 2021 ARIA Awards. It was also longlisted for the 2021 Australian Music Prize.

== Track listing ==
All tracks are written by Tropical Fuck Storm.

Deep States track listing
No.	Title	Length
1.	"The Greatest Story Ever Told"	5:04
2.	"G.A.F.F."	5:17
3.	"Blue Beam Baby"	5:09
4.	"Suburbiopia"	4:00
5.	"Bumma Sanger"	4:53
6.	"The Donkey"	7:13
7.	"Reporting of a Failed Campaign"	5:38
8.	"New Romeo Agent"	4:53
9.	"Legal Ghost"	6:05
10.	"The Confinement of the Quarks"	2:25
Total length:		50:31

== Personnel ==
- "Gaz" (Gareth Liddiard) – performer, recording engineer, mixing engineer
- "Fi Fi" (Fiona Kitschin) – performer
- "RKO" (Erica Dunn) – performer
- "Hammer" (Lauren Hammel) – performer

=== Additional credits ===
- Amy Taylor – synths (track: 4)
- Sean Powell – synths, acoustic drums (track: 4)
- Dan Kelly – synths (track: 4)
- Mike Deslandes – recording, mixing
- John Davis – mastering
- Joe Becker – cover art
- Jamie Wdziekonski – photography

== Charts ==
Chart performance for Deep States
Chart (2021)	Peak position
Australian Albums (ARIA)	7
Independent Label Albums	1
