= High Tension (band) =

Australian musical group

- Origin: Melbourne, Victoria, Australia
- Genres: Extreme metal, hard rock, hardcore punk, heavy metal, stoner rock, sludge metal
- Years active: 2012–2021
- Label: Cooking Vinyl Australia
- Spinoffs: Tropical Fuck Storm, Rinuwat, Kilat
- Spinoff of: Young and Restless, The Nation Blue
- Past members: Karina Utomo; Matt Weston; Mike Deslandes; Lauren Hammel; Ash Pegram; Dan McKay; Damian Coward
- Website: http://www.hightension.com.au

High Tension was an Australian extreme metal band from Melbourne, Victoria, from 2012 until 2021.

== History ==
Formed in 2012, the band's original line-up featured Karina Utomo and Ash Pegram from Young and Restless with Matt Weston from The Nation Blue and Damian Coward from Love Like...Electrocution. Only Utomo and Weston remained from the original line-up throughout; the final line-up of the band featured guitarist Mike Deslandes (also of YLVA), and drummer Lauren Hammel.

Their debut album, Death Beat, was released in October 2013 and was nominated for best hard rock / heavy metal album at the 2014 ARIA Awards.

Bully was released on 10 July 2015. The track "Guillotine" was used in Warwick Thornton's 2021/2 vampire TV series, Firebite.

The band split up in 2021.

== Band members ==
Final line-up

- Karina Utomo – lead vocals (2012–2021)
- Matt Weston – bass (2012–2021)
- Mike Deslandes – guitar, backing vocals (2015–2021)
- Lauren Hammel – drums (2015–2021)

Former members

- Ash Pegram – guitar (2012–2015)
- Damian Coward – drums (2012–2013, 2014–2015)
- Dan McKay – drums (2013–2014)

Former touring musicians

- Allan Stacey – bass (2018)

== Discography ==
=== Albums ===
List of studio albums
Title	Details
Death Beat	Released: October 2013; Label: High Tension, Cooking Vinyl Australia (CVLP005); Format: CD, LP, DD
Bully	Released: 10 June 2015; Label: High Tension, Cooking Vinyl Australia (CVLP030); Format: CD, LP, DD
Purge	Released: 15 June 2018; Label: Cooking Vinyl Australia (CVLP075); Format: CD, LP, DD, streaming

=== Extended plays ===
List of EPs
Title	Details
High Tension	Released: October 2012; Label: OSCL Records (OSCL007); Format: CD, DD

== Awards and nominations ==
=== AIR Awards ===
The Australian Independent Record Awards (commonly known informally as AIR Awards) is an annual awards night to recognise, promote and celebrate the success of Australia's Independent Music sector.

Year	Nominee / work	Award	Result
2019	Purge	Best Independent Hard Rock, Heavy or Punk Album	Nominated

=== ARIA Music Awards ===
The ARIA Music Awards is an annual awards ceremony held by the Australian Recording Industry Association. They commenced in 1987.

Year	Nominee / work	Award	Result
2014	Death Beat	Best Hard Rock or Heavy Metal Album	Nominated

=== Music Victoria Awards ===
The Music Victoria Awards are an annual awards night celebrating Victorian music. They commenced in 2006.

Year	Nominee / work	Award	Result	Ref.
2018	Purge	Best Heavy Album	Nominated	

=== National Live Music Awards ===
The National Live Music Awards (NLMAs) commenced in 2016 to recognise contributions to the live music industry in Australia.

Year	Nominee / work	Award	Result
2016	Themselves	Live Hard Rock Act of the Year	Nominated
2017	Themselves	Live Hard Rock Act of the Year	Nominated
2018	Themselves	Live Act of the Year	Nominated
2018	Karina Utomo (High Tension)	Live Voice of the Year	Nominated
2019	Lauren Hammel (High Tension)	Live Drummer of the Year	Won
