= Music Victoria Awards of 2018 =

Annual Australian music awards ceremony

- Date: 21 November 2018
- Venue: The Melbourne Recital Centre, Melbourne, Victoria
- Hosted by: Lyndelle Wilkinson and Chris Gill

Highlights
- Most wins: Baker Boy (4)

The Music Victoria Awards of 2018 were the 13th Annual Music Victoria Awards and consist of a series of awards, presented on 21 November 2018, during Melbourne Music Week.

The Melbourne Recital Centre hosted the event for the first time, and, also for the first time, the Victorian Government provided $10,000 to the Best Victorian Album of 2018, and $5,000 to the Best Victorian Breakthrough Act of 2018.

On the 6 August 2018, a number of categories change were announced for the 2018 event.

- The awards for Best Male and Female Act were renamed to Best Male and Female Musician accordingly.
- The Best Solo Artist category was introduced to include gender non-conforming artists. Ten artists will be nominated, and Music Victoria's 40/40/20 gender diversity quotas will apply.
- Best Emerging Act was renamed to Breakthrough Act.
- The awards for Best Regional Venue and Best Regional Act were renamed to Best Regional/Outer Suburban Venue and Best Regional Act/Outer Suburban Act accordingly.
- Best Festival award went from "general" category to "industry" voted.
- Best Reggae or Dance Hall Act and Best Rock/Punk Album were introduced, allowing the Best Heavy Album category to more specifically celebrate metal and hard rock subgenres.
- Best Indigenous/Aboriginal Act was renamed to The Archie Roach Foundation Award for Emerging Talent, and will now come with a cash grant and mentorship as part of the award.

Awards Executive Producer Patrick Donovan said "After each awards we survey the industry and judges to make sure the categories best reflect what is happening in Victoria in the year and the most deserved contributors to the industry are acknowledged. We are confident these changes to criteria and judging panels will result in awards that are more inclusive and better reflect outstanding achievements."

To be eligibility, at least 50% of the act has been living in Victoria for the last two years. The album, single or EP must have been released between 1 September 2017 and 31 August 2018.

== Hall of Fame inductees ==
- Chrissy Amphlett, Molly Meldrum

== Award nominees and winners ==
=== General awards ===
Voted on by the public. Winners indicated in boldface, with other nominees in plain.

Best Album	Best Song
**Courtney Barnett – Tell Me How You Really Feel**; Camp Cope – How to Socialise & Make Friends; Laura Jean – Devotion; Rolling Blackouts Coastal Fever – Hope Downs; Sampa the Great – Birds and the Bee9	**Baker Boy – "Marryuna"**; Camp Cope – "The Opener"; Courtney Barnett – "Nameless, Faceless"; Laura Jean – "Girls on the TV"; Mojo Juju – "Native Tongue"
Best Male Musician	Best Female Musician
**Danzal Baker (Baker Boy)**; Didirri Peters (Didirri); Gareth Liddiard (Tropical Fuck Storm); Jake Robertson (School Damage, Alien Nosejob); Tom Iansek (No Mono)	**Courtney Barnett**; Erica Dunn (Tropical Fuck Storm, Mod Con, Palm Springs); Laura Englert (Laura Jean); Mojo Ruiz De Luzuriaga (Mojo Juju); Sampa Tembo (Sampa The Great)
Best Band	Best Solo Artist
**Camp Cope**; King Gizzard & the Lizard Wizard; MOD CON; Rolling Blackouts Coastal Fever; Tropical Fuck Storm	**Courtney Barnett**; Alex Lahey; Angie McMahon; Baker Boy; Didirri; Laura Jean; Mojo Juju; Sampa The Great; Tash Sultana; Vance Joy
Breakthrough Act of 2018	Best Live Act
**Baker Boy**; Angie McMahon; Kaiit; Mildlife; Mod Con	**Baker Boy**; Amyl and the Sniffers; Cable Ties; Courtney Barnett; King Gizzard & the Lizard Wizard
Best Venue (Over 500 Capacity)	Best Venue (Under 500 Capacity)
**Corner Hotel, Richmond**; 170 Russell; The Croxton Bandroom; Hamer Hall, Melbourne; Melbourne Recital Centre	**Northcote Social Club, Northcote**; Howler, Brunswick; The Gasometer Hotel, Collingwood; The Old Bar, Fitzroy; The Tote Hotel, Collingwood

=== Genre Specific Awards ===
Voted by a select industry panel

Best Blues Album	Best Country Album
**Collard Greens and Gravy – Luedella**; Fiona Boyes – Voodoo in the Shadows; Lloyd Spiegel – Backroads; Rhythm X Revival – Rhythm X Revival; Steve Boyd's Rum Reverie – Hoodoo Hipshake	**James Ellis & The Jealous Guys – It's Ain't Texas (But It Ain't Bad)**; Ben Mastwyk & The Millions – Winning Streak; Freya Josephine Hollick – Feral Fusion; Greta Ziller – Queen of Boomtown; Michael Waugh – The Asphalt & The Oval
Best Soul, Funk, R'n'B and Gospel Album	Best Jazz Album
**Sampa The Great – Birds and the BEE9**; 30/70 – Elevate; The Bamboos – Night Time People; Billy Davis – A Family Portrait; Mildlife – Phase	**Sam Anning Sextet – Across a Field as Vast as One**; 30/70 – Elevate; Barney McAll – Hearing the Blood; Menagerie – The Arrow of Time; Origami - Wu Xing – The 5 Elements
Best Hip Hop Act	Best Electronic Act
**Sampa the Great**; Baker Boy; DRMNGNOW; Jordan Dennis; Kaiit	**Mildlife**; Alice Ivy; Cale Sexton; Corin; Habits
Best Heavy Album	Best Folk or Roots Album
**Encircling Sea – Hearken**; Dangerous Curves – So Dirty Right; Dream On, Dreamer – It Comes and Goes; High Tension – Purge; YLVA – Meta	**Michael Waugh – The Asphalt & The Oval**; Cat Canteri – Inner North; Lucy Wise – Winter Sun; Luke Plumb & The Circuit – Turn & ReTurn; Trouble in the Kitchen – The Score
Best Global Act	Best Experimental/Avant-Garde Act
**Senegambian Jazz Band**; Cool Out Sun; Digital Afrika; Mojo Juju; Xylouris White	**Nat Grant**; Aviva Endean; Maria Moles; MESS Ltd; Romy Fox
Best Reggae or Dance Hall Act	Best Rock/Punk Album
**Monkey Marc**; Marvin Priest & Rik-E-Ragga; Melbourne Ska Orchestra; Ras Jahknow; Yaw Faso	**Little Ugly Girls – Little Ugly Girls**; Camp Cope – How to Socialise & Make Friends; Divide and Dissolve – Abomination; Sarah Mary Chadwick – Sugar Still Melts in the Rain; Tropical Fuck Storm – A Laughing Death in Meatspace

=== Other Awards ===
Voted by a select industry panel

Best Regional/Outer Suburban Venue (Over 50 Gigs a Year)	Best Regional/Outer Suburban Venue (Under 50 Gigs a Year)
**Karova Lounge, Ballarat**; Barwon Club, South Geelong; Caravan Music Club, Bentleigh East; Sooki Lounge, Belgrave; The Workers Club, Geelong	**Meeniyan Town Hall, Meeniyan**; Aireys Pub, Aireys; Inlet Blues Train, Queenscliff; Theatre Royal, Castlemaine; Wandi Pub, Wandiligong
Best Regional Act/Outer Suburban Act	Best Festival
**This Way North**; Benny Walker; Freya Josephine Hollick; High Tension; Stonefield	**Golden Plains Festival**; Gizzfest; Meredith Music Festival; Sugar Mountain; Wet Fest
The Archie Roach Foundation Award for Emerging Talent
**Kaiit**; Alice Skye; Baker Boy; Oetha; Willow Beats
