= Michael Waugh (singer) =

Australian singer-songwriter

- Born: Australia
- Origin: Heyfield, Victoria Australia
- Occupation: Singer-songwriter
- Years active: 2013–present
- Labels: Compass Brothers
- Website: www.michaelwaugh.com.au

Michael Waugh is an Australian country music singer and songwriter. He released his debut studio album, What We Might Be in 2015. In 2018, his album The Asphalt and the Oval won Best Folk or Roots Album at the Music Victoria Awards of 2018.

== Career ==
Waugh began writing songs at age of 13. He performed in musical theatre and studied at Melba Conservatorium. He is a qualified teacher.

In 2012, Waugh began working in his debut album and in 2013, released the EP Heyfield Girl, with the title track, dedicated to his mother. He later performed the track at the 2017 Country Music Awards of Australia.

Waugh's debut album What We Might Be was produced by Shane Nicholson and released in February 2016. A second album was released in February 2018.

In 2019, Waugh signed with Compass Brothers and in September 2019, released his third studio album The Weir. The album was nominated for two golden guitars at the 2020 CMAAs.

In August 2021, Waugh released his fourth studio album, The Cast. The album included the song "Dirty River", a song about the Yarra River in Melbourne.

== Discography ==
=== Albums ===
List of albums, with Australian chart positions
Title	Album details	Peak chart positions
Title	Album details	AUS
What We Might Be	Released: February 2016; Label: MGM (PSMMW001); Format: CD, digital download, streaming	—
The Asphalt and the Oval	Released: February 2018; Label: MGM (PSMMW002); Format: CD, digital	—
The Weir	Released: September 2019; Label: Compass Brothers, UMA (100CDCB); Format: CD, digital	— (Note: The Weir did not enter the top 100 ARIA Album Charts, but peaked at number 7 on the ARIA Country Albums Chart.)
The Cast	Released: August 2021; Label: Compass Brothers, UMA (102CDCB); Format: CD, LP, digital	— (Note: The Cast did not enter the top 100 ARIA Album Charts, but peaked at number 11 on the ARIA Country Albums Chart.)
Beauty & Truth	Released: 21 June 2024; Label: Compass Brothers, UMA (111CBCD); Format: CD, LP, digital	— (Note: Beauty & Truth did not enter the top 100 ARIA Album Charts, but peaked at number 26on the ARIA Country Albums Chart.)

=== Extended plays ===
List of EPs
Title	EP details
Heyfield Girl	Released: 2013; Label: Michael Waugh; Format: CD

== Awards and nominations ==
=== AIR Awards ===
The Australian Independent Record Awards (commonly known informally as AIR Awards) is an annual awards night to recognise, promote and celebrate the success of Australia's Independent Music sector.

Year	Nominee / work	Award	Result	Ref.
2025	Beauty & Truth	Best Independent Country Album or EP	Nominated	

=== Country Music Awards of Australia ===
The Country Music Awards of Australia is an annual awards night held in January during the Tamworth Country Music Festival. Celebrating recording excellence in the Australian country music industry. They commenced in 1973.

Year	Nominee / work	Award	Result	Ref.
2020	Male Artist of the Year	The Weir	Nominated	
2020	Alt. Country Album of the Year	The Weir	Nominated	
2022	Heritage Song of the Year	"Dirty River"	Won	
2025	Album of the Year	Beauty & the Truth	Nominated	
2025	Alt. Country Album of the Year	Beauty & the Truth	Nominated	
2025	Male Artist of the Year	Michael Waugh	Nominated	
2025	Heritage Song of the Year	"Father's Day"	Nominated	
2025	Vocal Collaboration of the Year	"Sing Me the Land" (with Colin Buchanan)	Nominated	

=== Music Victoria Awards ===
The Music Victoria Awards, are an annual awards night celebrating Victorian music. They commenced in 2005.

Year	Nominee / work	Award	Result	Ref.
2018	The Asphalt & The Oval	Best Blues and Roots Album	Won	
2018	The Asphalt & The Oval	Best Country Album	Nominated	
2020	The Weir	Best Country Album	Nominated	
2022	Michael Waugh	Best Country Work	Nominated	
