= Mod Con =

Australian music trio

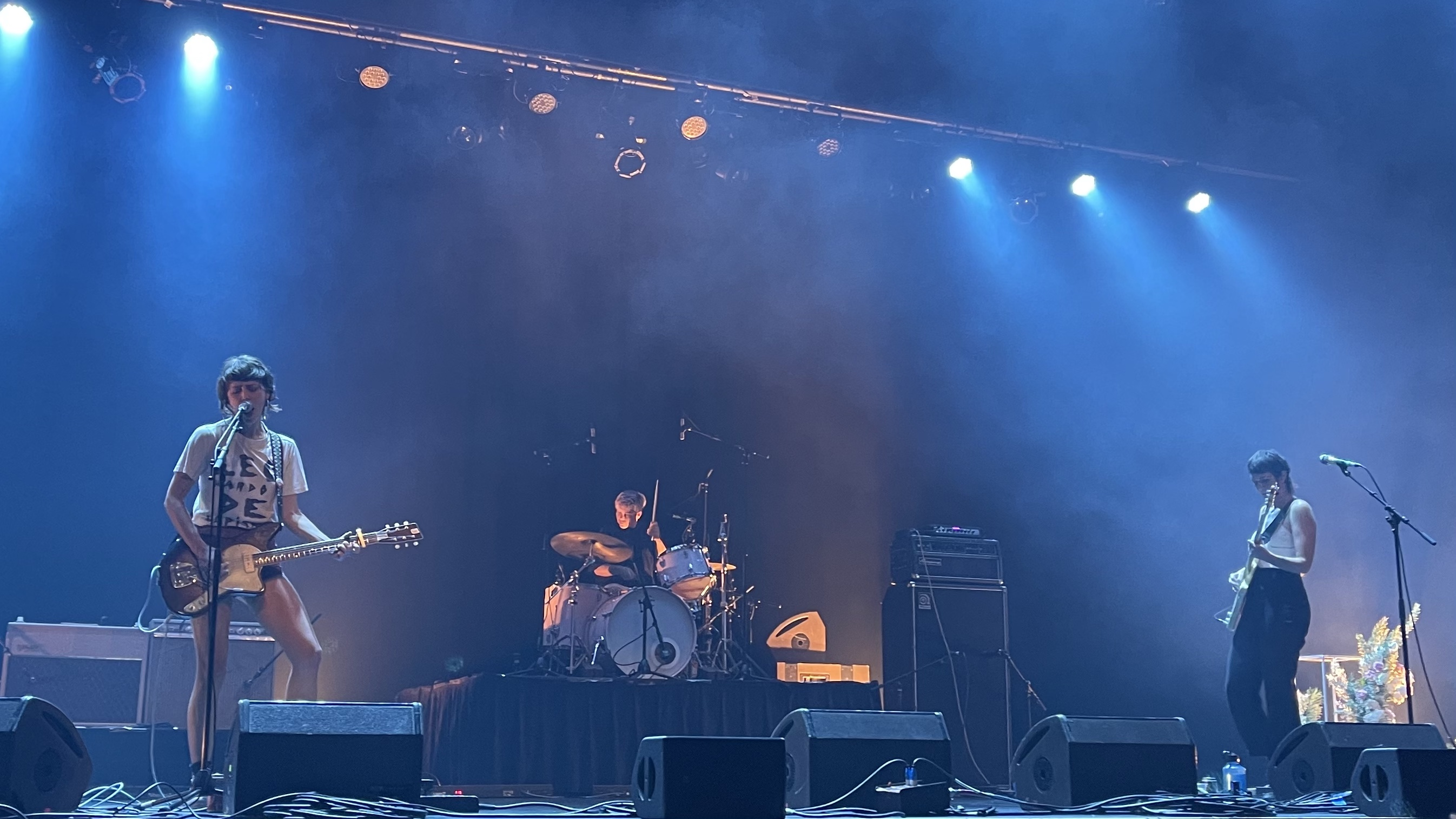
- Mod Con playing at the Forum Melbourne in March 2021

Background information
- Origin: Melbourne, Victoria Australia
- Years active: 2017–present
- Labels: Poison City Records
- Members: Erica Dunn (guitar, vocals); Sara Retallick (bass, vocals); Raquel Solier (drums)

Mod Con are an Australian trio consisting of Erica Dunn, Sara Retallick and Raquel Solier.

They released their debut studio album Modern Convenience in April 2018. Their second, Modern Condition was released in October 2021.

== History ==
Mod Con is a three-piece based out of Melbourne who originally played together under the moniker Palm Springs. Having known each other for some time and playing with various solo and collaborative projects. Over Easter 2017, the trio recorded their debut album with Gareth Liddiard at his home in the Goulburn Valley. The album was released in April 2018 and described by NME Australia as "One of the most inventive, attention-grabbing local debuts in recent memory."

On 18 June 2021, the trio released "Ammo", the lead single from their second studio album Modern Condition. Modern Condition was recorded with engineer John Lee at Phaedra Studios Melbourne and released on 22 October 2021.

== Discography ==
=== Albums ===
List of studio albums, with Australian chart positions
Title	Album details	Peak chart positions
Title	Album details	AUS
Modern Convenience	Released: 6 April 2018; Label: Poison City (PCR146LP); Format: DD, LP, streaming	—
Modern Condition	Released: 22 October 2021; Label: Poison City (PCR170CD) / (PCR170LP); Format: CD, LP, DD, streaming	72

== Awards and nominations ==
=== AIR Awards ===
The Australian Independent Record Awards (commonly known informally as AIR Awards) is an annual awards night to recognise, promote and celebrate the success of Australia's Independent Music sector.

Year	Nominee / work	Award	Result	Ref.
2022	Modern Condition	Best Independent Punk Album or EP	Nominated	

=== Music Victoria Awards ===
The Music Victoria Awards, are an annual awards night celebrating Victorian music. The commenced in 2005.

Year	Nominee / work	Award	Result	Ref.
2018	Erica Dunn	Best Female Musician	Nominated	
2018	Mod Con	Best Band	Nominated	
2018	Mod Con	Breakthrough Act	Nominated	
2019	Erica Dunn	Best Female Musician	Won	
2020	Erica Dunn	Best Musician	Nominated	
2021	Erica Dunn	Best Musician	Nominated	
