= Braindrops =

Studio album by Tropical Fuck Storm
- Released: 23 August 2019
- Recorded: 2018–2019
- Studios: Dodgy Bros Studios (Nagambie, Victoria)
- Genres: Art rock; psychedelic rock; noise rock; post-punk; experimental rock
- Length: 48:11
- Labels: Joyful Noise; Flightless
- Producers: Gareth Liddiard; Mike Deslandes

Tropical Fuck Storm chronology
A Laughing Death in Meatspace (2018)	Braindrops (2019)	Deep States (2021)

Singles from Braindrops
- 1. "The Planet of Straw Men" Released: 4 March 2019; 2. "Paradise" Released: 17 June 2019; 3. "Who's My Eugene?" Released: 25 July 2019; 4. "Braindrops" Released: 19 August 2019

Braindrops is the second studio album by Australian supergroup Tropical Fuck Storm. It was released on 23 August 2019 through Flightless Records in Australia and Joyful Noise Recordings worldwide.

== Background ==
Following the release of their debut A Laughing Death in Meatspace in May 2018, the band would go on to play a series of national and international dates in varying capacities, including a few dates opening for Modest Mouse (on their fall tour in October 2018) and King Gizzard and the Lizard Wizard (as a part of their Gizzfest event).

On 23 August 2018, the band premiered the song "The Happiest Guy Around", which ended up being one half of a split single with Liars (who contributed the track "Total 3 Part Saga") as the 18th instalment of the LAMC (Less Artists More Condos) series of 7-inch singles curated by Famous Class Records; where "an established musician on the A-side" is paired "with one of the musician’s favorite new artists on the B-side". The 7-inch was released on 28 September.

On 21 January 2019, King Gizzard and the Lizard Wizard posted an image of them jamming with Liddiard in the foreground flipping the bird on their official Instagram account. This led some to speculate Liddiard's involvement with the band's new material "either as a guest or producer." On 4 March, Flightless announced that Tropical Fuck Storm had signed with them in Australia and New Zealand, and on the same day, the band premiered "The Planet of Straw Men" with video, which would be the first single from their second album Braindrops, set to be released "mid-2019" through Joyful Noise Records worldwide and Flightless in Australia and New Zealand.

On 17 June 2019, the band released the second single from their upcoming album, "Paradise"; the name of the album was also revealed to be Braindrops the same day, and its release date of 23 August was announced.

== Release ==
Aside from the aforementioned singles, Joyful Noise released limited edition vinyl through their mail order website, and distributed hot magenta coloured vinyl and CD versions of the album.

=== Singles ===
Four singles have been released from the album: "The Planet of Straw Men", "Paradise", "Who's My Eugene?" and "Braindrops". Music videos for the tracks "The Planet of Straw Men", "Braindrops", "Who's My Eugene?" and "The Happiest Guy Around" have also been released. A different mix of the track "The Happiest Guy Around" had also previously appeared as the B-side to a split single with Liars in August 2018, as a part of the LAMC series of singles curated by Famous Class Records.

=== Cover ===
Joe Becker, who had previously created the cover art for their debut album, was also credited with the cover art for Braindrops.

== Reception ==
=== Critical ===
Professional ratings
Aggregate scores
Source	Rating
AnyDecentMusic?	7.7/10
Metacritic	77/100
Review scores
Source	Rating
AllMusic	3.5/5 stars
DIY	4/5 stars
Dork	3/5 stars
Exclaim!	8/10
The Line of Best Fit	8/10
The Music	4/5 stars
Paste	8.2/10
Sputnikmusic	4.5/5 stars
Uncut	8/10

The album currently holds a Metacritic score of 77 based on 10 reviews and an AnyDecentMusic? score of 7.7 based on 13 reviews.

Treble magazine, in a review published on 12 August 2019, named Braindrops their "Album of the Week" praising the track "Paradise" as "a sickly mirage of an oasis—you can practically see the disspiating heat haze over Liddiard's trickling guitar riffs. It slowly escalates its way toward a furious climax, turning into one of the most explosive break-up songs in recent memory". The review concludes: "Tropical Fuck Storm invite the chaos, orchestrating it, manipulating it, delivering a piece of mangled and bruised art that sounds magnificent at its most frayed and fragmented. It's a weirdness that feels strangely assuring, even necessary." NARC Magazine gave the album a perfect score, writing that it "pretty much cements the Australians as one of the most vital acts on the planet right now." Exclaim! called it "a psychedelic rock opera occasionally dipping its toes in the stream of electro-punk. The result is equal parts harrowing and electrifying, surreal and far too familiar." According to Paste, "[l]istening to Braindrops feels like watching a sped-up timeline of rising sea levels and melting glaciers set to long-lost field recordings of maximalist noise-rock from the Outback. You're listening to a world falling apart." Braindrops, writes The Line of Best Fit, "is as cerebral and gut-level as its name implies, high-minded and high volume, a grand mess that isn't really a mess at all."

=== Contemporary ===
In an interview with Konbini, Iggy Pop praised the title track of the album, simply calling it "a good fuck". Both Michael Feuerstack and Conan Neutron called it one of their favourite albums of the year, with the latter calling it "an utterly befuddling and "wrong" sounding record that is oh so "right." There isn't a clear monster single like "tyres" on this one, but the whole thing has a snakey, baked in the sun vibe that works its way into your subconscious."

=== Awards and nominations ===
The album has been nominated for the Australian Music Prize of 2019.

=== Accolades ===
Accolades for Braindrops
Publication	Country	Accolade	Rank
Double J	Australia	The 50 best albums of 2019	38
The Sydney Morning Herald (Craig Mathieson)	Australia	The best 10 albums of 2019 (and a few that came close)	-
Junkee	Australia	The 15 Best Albums Of 2019	-
Slate	US	The Best Albums of 2019	-
Brooklyn Vegan	US	Bill's Indie Basement: Best of 2019	39
City Pages	US	The 75 best albums of 2019	53
Loud and Quiet	UK	The Loud And Quiet best 40 albums of 2019	12
OOR	Netherlands	The 40 Best Albums of The Year 2019	42
Mondo Sonoro	Spain	The best international albums of 2019	27
Rockdelux	Spain	Best international albums of 2019	48
Magic	France	The100 best albums of the year 2019	84

== Track listing ==
All tracks are written by Tropical Fuck Storm.

Braindrops track listing
No.	Title	Length
1.	"Paradise"	6:14
2.	"The Planet of Straw Men"	4:52
3.	"Who's My Eugene?"	4:41
4.	"The Happiest Guy Around"	4:28
5.	"Maria 62"	3:56
6.	"Braindrops"	6:42
7.	"Aspirin"	5:14
8.	"Desert Sands of Venus"	4:14
9.	"Maria 63"	7:50
Total length:		48:11

== Personnel ==
- "Gaz" (Gareth Liddiard) – performer, recording engineer, mixing engineer
- "Fi Fi" (Fiona Kitschin) – performer
- "RKO" (Erica Dunn) – performer
- "Hammer" (Lauren Hammel) – performer

=== Additional credits ===
- J.P. Shilo – violin (tracks: 5, 8, 9), guitar (tracks: 5, 8, 9), organ (tracks: 5, 8, 9)
- Венера-14 – field recordings (track: 8)
- Mike Deslandes – recording, mixing
- Dav Byrne – mastering
- Joe Becker – cover painting
- Jamie Wdziekonski – photography
- Andrew Quilty – photography
- David Woodruff – layout

== Charts ==
Chart performance for Braindrops
Chart (2019)	Peak position
Australian Albums (ARIA)	10
Australian Independent Albums (AIR)	2
US Heatseekers Albums (Billboard)	3
US Independent Albums (Billboard)	18
US Top Album Sales (Billboard)	93
