= Tom (Ethiopian instrument) =

The tom is a plucked lamellophone thumb piano used in the traditional music of the Nuer and Anuak ethnic groups of western Ethiopia. The instruments is also called thoom Otieno and may also be spelled toom and thom.

Thoom is a Anywaa word. Besides being a word for a thumb piano, the word is used generally by parts of the country’s population to mean “musical instrument.” It is also the name of an Ethiopian lyre.

The state-run Ras Theatre brought music from different parts of Ethiopia to its stage, including the ‘’tom’’, played by the “Nilo-Saharan peoples from the Gambela Region.“ The instrument was also used in some pieces performed by Orchestra Ethiopia in the 1960s.
