= The Nation Blue =

- Origin: Tasmania, Australia

The Nation Blue is a rock band formed in Tasmania and based in Melbourne, Victoria, noted for their intense live performances and bleak subject matter. They have toured nationally in Australia and internationally in Brazil, America and Japan and have supported Helmet and Foo Fighters. In the third song of their first set in support of the Foo Fighters, bass player, Matt Weston, dislocated his knee and lay on the stage floor for the remainder of the set.

At the fourth annual AIR Awards, held on 22 November 2009, The Nation Blue won the 'Best Independent Hard Rock/Punk Album' award for Rising Waters.

== Members ==
- Tom Lyngcoln – vocals, guitar
- Matt Weston – bass
- Dan McKay – drums

== Discography ==
=== Albums ===
List of albums, with release date and label shown
Title	Details	Peak chart positions
Title	Details	AUS Artist
'01	Released: 1997; Label: The Nation Blue; Formats: demo cassette	—
A Blueprint for Modern Noise	Released: September 2001; Label: Trial and Error (TRIAL021CD); Formats: CD, 2×LP (2013)	—
A Blueprint for Modern Noise	Released: September 2001; Label: Trial and Error (TRIAL021CD); Formats: CD, 2×LP (2013)	—
Damnation	Released: September 2004; Label: Casadeldisco Records (CASA03); Formats: CD, 2×LP (2025)	12
Protest Songs	Released: 2007; Label: Casadeldisco Records (CASA08); Formats: CD,	—
Rising Waters	Released: September 2009; Label: Casadeldisco Records (CASA012); Formats: CD, digital	—
Black	Released: 2016; Label: Poison City Records (PCR127LP); Formats: CD, LP, digital	—
Blue	Released: October 2016; Label: Poison City Records (PCR128LP); Formats: CD, LP, digital	—

=== Eps ===
List of EPs, with release date and label shown
Title	Details	Peak chart positions
Title	Details	AUS Artist
Descend	Released: 1999; Label: Fear of Children (FOC 031); Formats: CD	—

== Awards ==
=== AIR Awards ===
The Australian Independent Record Awards (commonly known informally as AIR Awards) is an annual awards night to recognise, promote and celebrate the success of Australia's Independent Music sector.

Year	Nominee / work	Award	Result
2009	Rising Waters	Best Independent Hard Rock/Punk Album	Won
