= The Drones discography =

- Studio albums: 6
- EPs: 3
- Live albums: 9
- Compilation albums: 1
- Singles: 11
- Video albums: 2

The discography of Australian band The Drones, consists of six studio albums, one compilation album, nine live albums, three EPs and 11 singles.

== Albums ==
=== Studio albums ===
List of studio albums, with selected chart positions and certifications
Title	Album details	Peak chart positions
Title	Album details	AUS
Here Come the Lies	Released: 1 August 2002; Label: Spooky Records (Spooky006); Formats: CD	-
Wait Long by the River and the Bodies of Your Enemies Will Float By	Released: 18 April 2005; Label: In-Fidelity Recordings (INFCD106); Formats: CD, digital download	-
Gala Mill	Released: 2 September 2006; Label: ATP Recordings, Shock (ATPRCD22); Formats: CD, digital download	66
Havilah	Released: 20 September 2008; Label: ATP Recordings, Shock (ATPRCD31); Formats: CD, digital download, LP	47
I See Seaweed	Released: March 2013; Label: Bang! Records (Bang!-CD80); Formats: CD, digital download, 2x LP	18
Feelin Kinda Free	Released: 18 March 2016; Label: Tropical Fuck Storm Records (TFSR002); Formats: CD, digital download, LP, streaming	12

== Live albums ==
List of live albums
Title	Details
Live in Spaceland	Released: 2 February 2007; Label: Spaceland Recordings (No. 13); Format: CD, DD
Live at the Annandale Hotel 18th, 19th October 2007	Released: 2008; Label: Annandale Hotel (ADH 001); Format: LP, DD
Live at the Hi-Fi	Released: 2 October 2009; Label: ATP Recordings; Format: CD, LP, DD
A Thousand Mistakes	Released: 2011; Label: Bang! Records (BANG! LP57); Format: 2x LP, DD
Live Vol. 1, 2001-2004	Released: 20 March 2020; Label: The Drones; Format: DD
Live Vol. 2, Spanish Club Melbourne	Released: 30 March 2020; Label: The Drones; Format: DD; Recorded: 4 March 2006
Live Vol. 3, 2004-2008	Released: 30 March 2020; Label: The Drones; Format: DD
Live Vol. 4, 2009-2012	Released: 30 March 2020; Label: The Drones; Format: DD
Live Vol. 5, The Tote Melbourne	Released: 30 March 2020; Label: The Drones; Format: DD; Recorded: 29 May 2016

== Compilation albums ==
List of compilation albums
Title	Details
The Miller's Daughter	Released: 2005; Label: Bang! Records (BANG! CD5); Format: CD, LP; Note: Compiles out takes from the band's first two albums

== Extended plays ==
List of extended plays
Title	Details
The Drones	Released: 2001; Label: The Drones; Format: CD; Note: Limited to 500
Custom Made	Released: November 2007; Label: ATP Recordings (ATPR6D01); Format: CD, 2xLP
The Minotaur + A Brief Retrospective	Released: 2008; Label: ATP Recordings (ATPREP01); Format: CD, LP

=== Singles ===
Title	Year	Album
"Cockeyed Lowlife of the Highlands"	2002	Here Come the Lies
"Bird in a Church"	2002	Here Come the Lies
"Shark Fin Blues"	2005	Wait Long by the River and the Bodies of Your Enemies Will Float By
"Jezebel"	2006	Gala Mill
"I Don't Ever Want to Change"	2006	Gala Mill
"The Minotaur"	2008	Havilah
"River of Tears"	2009	Live at the Hi-Fi
"How to See Through Fog"	2013	I See Seaweed
"Taman Shud"	2015	Feelin Kinda Free
"To Think That I Once Loved You"	2016	Feelin Kinda Free
"Boredom"	2018	Feelin Kinda Free

== Live DVDs ==
List of extended plays
Title	Details
Live in Madrid	Released: July 2007; Label: Munster(MR DVD 004); Format: DVD
A Thousand Mistakes	Released: 2011; Label: Shock (DRONESDVD01); Format: 2xDVD
