= Springtime (Springtime album) =

Studio album by Springtime
- Released: November 5, 2021
- Recorded: 2021
- Studio: Dodgy Bros Studios (Nagambie, Victoria)
- Genres: Art rock; free jazz; free improvisation; noise
- Length: 46:42
- Labels: TFS Records (AUS); Joyful Noise Recordings (US)
- Producer: Springtime

Springtime chronology
Springtime (2021)	Night Raver EP (2022)

Singles from Springtime
- 1. "Will to Power" Released: September 21st, 2021; 2. "The Viaduct Love Suicide" Released: October 12th, 2021

Springtime is the debut album from Australian supergroup Springtime, consisting of Gareth Liddiard, Chris Abrahams and Jim White. Recorded over 15 days at Liddiard's home studio in Nagambie, the largely-improvised album features lyrics from his uncle Ian Duhig, in addition to a Will Oldham cover and a reworking of a track by The Drones. It was released in Australia through TFS Records and in the US through Joyful Noise Recordings to largely positive reviews.

At the 2022 ARIA Music Awards, the album was nominated for ARIA Award for Best Jazz Album.

== Background ==
Springtime was conceived in early 2021 during the COVID-19 lockdown in Australia, shortly after Liddiard had finished recording Tropical Fuck Storm's third album Deep States. Liddiard recalled that at the time both he and White - who was "stuck" in Australia after having returned from Brooklyn for a Xylouris White tour due to "some family shit" - "were both in the same boat slowly going broke." In February, the duo performed a few shows in Melbourne which were billed as solo Liddiard shows, after which Liddiard had the "idea" to add Abrahams (with whom he had previously performed in The Triffids' 2008 reunion shows), thus making them a trio.

The then-unnamed trio proceeded to perform a number of sold-out shows in early May, including one at the Brunswick Ballroom. The name "Springtime" was chosen by White's "best friend" Guy Picciotto of Fugazi off of a list of possible names compiled by the members "in a rush". On May 26, the group released a live rendition of the Drones song "Penumbra" recorded at the aforementioned Brunswick Ballroom performance and announced that they would release a full-length album late that year.

== Recording ==
"They were like night and day [...] [Deep States] was like pushing shit uphill because [of] all the lockdowns, and every time we got a good start, everything got shut down. It was like trying to train for the Olympics, but every two weeks you have to sit inside and not do anything for two weeks. It was a real drag, and actually really frustrating"

— Liddiard comparing the recording process of Deep States to Springtime

Springtime was recorded in Liddiard's home studio in Nagambie, titled Dodgy Bros Studios in the liner notes. The recording of the album, according to Liddiard and White, involved a significant amount of musical improvisation and was completed in just 15 days with few overdubs. Liddiard described the compositional process of the songs and the reasoning behind it as follows:

I find it easier to improvise than by normal shit, and I think the guys would agree, it's just easier to come up with stuff. You don't have the pressure of remembering what you’re meant to be doing and all that. So yeah, it's fun and it's something to come up with stuff. It's quicker than with TFS. You know, we just, I just say, well, “I've got a few words”, and then Chris will go “let’s try these chords”. And we'll play it three times. And there it is. We've got a song. It's really, really easy.

Two of the album's songs feature lyrics from Liddiard's uncle, acclaimed poet Ian Duhig, whom he described as "one of the only capital G geniuses I’ve met." His help was sought due to the fact that Liddiard "didn’t have a huge amount of lyrics in the spare parts department" having recently finished recording Deep States: "So I thought, ‘Fuck, what am I gonna do? Oh yeah, my uncle’. So I just asked him if he’s got anything that would work lyrically." Abrahams plays a 400kg Steinway & Sons grand piano worth $100,000 on the album that the trio had "scored" off of a rich neighbour of theirs who needed a place to store it whilst shifting house.

== Content ==
Mojo's Martin Aston notes that Springtime has "two approaches": one of which is "more methodical" as exemplified by tracks such as "Will to Power" and the other of which is "rooted in improv". Sharon O'Connell of Uncut writes that the album's tracks are shaped by the "[c]ircumstantial urgency" of its recording, finding that they combine art rock, free improvisation, "effects and electronic noise, with deep space and unorthodox mixing a feature (at times, it sounds like White’s brush work is coming from half a mile away)." Mosi Reeves of The Wire described the music as "free, but never carefree, full of spontaneity, acidity and momentum, sputtering in a thousand different, noisy directions at once." Conversely, Michael Toland of The Big Takeover concluded that the results sound "closer to" Liddiard's previous band The Drones "than any of the principals’ other bands." According to the press release written by David Yow of The Jesus Lizard-fame, the album "is so full of strange wanderings that are broken and piled up on themselves that the heads have no idea where their tails are, [...] These three gentlemen work, play and improvise together in an emotionally volatile universe. You could call it ‘jazz’, but that word is way too jazzy for what Springtime creates."

The opening track and single "Will to Power" has been described as a "a vexing and visceral cut of alt-rock fused with elements of free jazz, the soundscape growing more cluttered and intense as Liddiard takes aim at the likes of “con men, con jobs, moralisers, modern saviours, agonisers, snake oil pundits, mass psychosis, ism schism [and] hocus pocus”." The track has been compared to Nick Cave and the Bad Seeds whilst Liddiard himself described it as a "disco jam" about humanity's tendency to do "more, more, more. Why can’t they just lounge about like lizards or kangaroos? What’s wrong with that?" The album's second single "The Viaduct Love Suicide" is the first of two tracks on the album to feature lyrics by Duhig, who had dedicated the poem "to the memory" of NHS worker Helen Rogan, who had committed suicide with her autistic son back in 2003, as well as other similar workers "in danger of – or actually being on – a treadmill of caring at work and at home with their own needs crushed, sometimes with tragic results." The opening lines of the song quote from Japanese playwright Chikamatsu Monzaemon's Bunraku play The Love Suicides at Sonezaki. The song has been described as "devastating" and compared to Neil Young's "Cortez the Killer"; Liddiard's vocals on it are as "tender as the tragedy demands". "Jeannie In A Bottle", the second of two tracks to utilise Duhig's poetry, features vocals from Liddiard's partner and Tropical Fuck Storm-bandmate Fiona Kitschin on its choruses that are sung in a falsetto. The "ominous, vaguely gothic" song details the "perils of alcohol" in its titular character through its "ebbing, fraying drama". Musically, it has been compared to the band Liars.

The "slow, floating pace" of the trio's rendition of the traditional Irish folk song "She Moved Through the Fair" earned comparisons to the album Ocean Songs by White's previous band Dirty Three as well as slowcore band Low. "The Island" is a cover of the Drones song of the same name off of their 2002 debut album that has been described as a "portrait of (quarantine) fear and isolation". The "crooked and minimal blues" track has been noted for its "slow build of improvisatory noise that overtakes [its] otherwise deliberate pace and volume". "West Palm Beach" is a recording of a live cover of a Will Oldham song that he had originally released under the "Palace" moniker. Liddiard revealed that they had decided to go with the live recording as he was unable to "nail" the vocals "in the studio." The closing track "The Killing of the Village Idiot" is based on the fatal shooting of two Afghan civilians (one of whom was intellectually-disabled) by an SAS soldier (later nicknamed "Soldier C") in 2012 - an incident that was later informally-dubbed "the village idiot killing". The song "forc[es] the listener to contemplate the war crime behavior of the Australian Special Forces in Afghanistan, with catharsis provided only by Liddiard’s industrial strength guitar solos."

== Release ==
Springtime was released on November 5, 2021, through TFS Records in Australia and Joyful Noise Recordings in the U.S.

=== Promotion ===
The release of Springtime was preceded by the release of two singles: "Will to Power" and "The Viaduct Love Suicide", both of which were accompanied by monochromatic music videos. Both videos were directed by Matt McGuigan and the former features shots of the band performing interspersed with clips from the 1922 silent horror film Häxan.

=== Reception ===
Professional ratings
Aggregate scores
Source	Rating
Metacritic	80/100
Review scores
Source	Rating
The Australian	4/5 stars
Mojo	4/5 stars
Musikexpress	4.5/6 stars
OndaRock	7.5/10
Uncut	7/10

The album has received largely positive reviews, currently holding a Metacritic score of 80 based on 4 reviews. Aston called the album "exhilarating" whilst O'Connell wondered whether a debut of this nature "might have been better served by an EP of original material. But then, Springtime isn’t some hopeful calling card made inside the industry machine. More infernal than vernal, it’s a document – of the coming together of three old hands and kindred spirits at a time when everything around them (and us) was coming apart." Reeves complimented the "sublime chaos" of the album, which they described as "soar[ing] through crunchy riffs and fervent vocals". Toland praised the album, finding that it "joins the list of great records with which Liddiard is frequently involved." Frank Sawatzki of Musikexpress similarly praised the album for its ability to create "another rock narrative fueled by melancholy and trauma, but one that repeatedly falls into non-rock worlds".

In a month-end round-up of the best Australian music, Nathan Jolly of The Guardian included "The Killing of the Village Idiot". "The relative anonymity of this project will probably see it overlooked," Jolly concludes, "but this song deserves to sit with Shark Fin Blues at the very top of Liddiard’s enviable canon." Yow also praised the album, calling it "as monstrously ravishing as it is clumsy in its elegance."

== Track listing ==
All tracks written by Springtime unless noted.

1. "Will to Power" - 5:40
2. "The Viaduct Love Suicide" - 5:15
3. "Jeanie in a Bottle" - 7:38
4. "She Moved Through the Fair" (traditional) - 5:31
5. "The Island" - 7:40
6. "West Palm Beach" (Will Oldham) - 5:56
7. "The Killing of the Village Idiot" - 9:02

== Personnel ==
Adapted from the album's liner notes.

=== Springtime ===
- Gareth Liddiard - performer
- Chris Abrahams - performer
- Jim White - performer

=== Additional credits ===
- Ian Duhig - lyrics (tracks 2 and 3)
- Fiona Kitschin - additional vocals (track 3)
- Mike Deslandes - recording and mixing
- Lachlan Carrick - mastering
- Anne Taylor - cover painting
- Jamie Wdziekonski - photography

== Charts ==
Chart (2021)	Peak position
ARIA Albums Chart	34
