= Oz (album) =

Studio album by Missy Higgins
- Released: 19 September 2014
- Recorded: 2013–2014
- Genre: Baroque pop, adult contemporary
- Length: 55:07
- Label: Eleven; Warner Bros./Reprise
- Producer: Missy Higgins, Jherek Bischoff

Missy Higgins chronology
The Ol' Razzle Dazzle (2012)	Oz (2014)	Solastalgia (2018)

Singles from Oz
- 1. "Shark Fin Blues" Released: 7 July 2014

Oz is the fourth studio album by Australian singer-songwriter Missy Higgins, and was released by Eleven on 19 September 2014. It is Higgins' first cover album, which is accompanied by a book of the same name that collects a series of essays by Higgins; using each song title as a jumping off point. The album's title refers to each of the artists covered being from Australia, as well as being a reference to the land of Oz as established in The Wizard of Oz.

Upon release, Higgins said “I wanted to try something different this time around. I couldn’t decide between making a covers album or writing a book so I decided to do both at once. Musically it’s intended to be a real mixed bag of lollies.” adding “I like the idea of songwriters being like the Wizard in The Wizard of Oz. Some people think we're special people who have special powers but really we're just scared little people hiding in a backroom somewhere, working like crazy to make sure we don't get found out.”

The album was originally conceived by Higgins and her manager, John Watson, as a circuit-breaker during the several years of depression and writer's block that preceded the singer's third album, The Ol' Razzle Dazzle in 2012. Higgins successfully persisted with writing her own material, but came back to the idea of interpreting some of her favourite Australian songs in 2013.

The album's lead single is "Shark Fin Blues", originally released by The Drones on their 2005 album Wait Long by the River.... It was released via SoundCloud on 7 July 2014. A music video for the song was released on 11 August 2014.

== Critical reception ==
Professional ratings
Review scores
Source	Rating
The Guardian	3/5 stars
The Music	4/5 stars
Renowned for Sound	4/5 stars

Everett True from The Guardian said: "Having Missy Higgins cover a series of widely disparate songs in her trademark style leads to an unintentional levelling off, a flattening of variety. Whether this is to the album's detriment will come down to how much you like Missy Higgins."

Carley Hill from The Music said: "Higgins has made these much-loved tracks sing with a bold, new voice", adding, "Higgins' lush symphonic rendering of The Drones' guttural "Shark Fin Blues" is arguably the best on the album."

Helena Ho from Renowned for Sound said: Higgins transformed "each track based on her own musical style, so that it is worthy to be critiqued as a new song altogether." adding "Oz is a tribute to some of the country’s greatest music artists."

Ali Birnie from Beat Magazine said: "Higgins has made these songs shine with her unique and beautiful style."

== Track listing ==
No.	Title	Writer(s)	Original Artist	Length
1.	"You Only Hide"	Stephanie Ashworth, Paul Dempsey, Clint Hyndman	Something for Kate	2:44
2.	"Old Fitzroy"	Dan Sultan	Dan Sultan	3:59
3.	"NYE"	Perry Keyes	Perry Keyes	3:55
4.	"Shark Fin Blues"	Gareth Liddiard	The Drones	5:16
5.	"Was There Anything I Could Do?"	Robert Forster, Grant McLennan	The Go-Betweens	2:52
6.	"Back to the Wall"	Christina Amphlett, Richard Feldman, Mark McEntee	Divinyls	3:53
7.	"Don't Believe Anymore"	Iva Davies	Icehouse	2:52
8.	"The Biggest Disappointment" (duet with Dan Sultan)	Joy McKean	Slim Dusty	3:01
9.	"Everybody Wants to Touch Me"	Paul Kelly	Paul Kelly	3:06
10.	"Curse on You"	Phillip Kakulas, Graham Lee, David McComb	The Blackeyed Susans	3:04
11.	"No Secrets"	Graham Bidstrup, Doc Neeson	The Angels	3:00
12.	"Before Too Long" (duet with Amanda Palmer)	Paul Kelly	Paul Kelly	4:21
13.	"Blackfella/Whitefella" (duet with Crystal Itjuwalyi Butcher)	George Djilaynga, Neil Murray	Warumpi Band	4:11
14.	"Calm and Crystal Clear"	Neil Murray	Neil Murray	3:43
15.	"The Way You Are Tonight"	Don Walker	Don Walker	5:02
16.	"Confide in Me" (iTunes exclusive)	Steve Anderson, Dave Seaman	Kylie Minogue	3:33
Total length:				58:33

== Charts ==
=== Weekly charts ===
Chart (2014)	Peak position
Australian Albums (ARIA)	3
New Zealand Albums (RMNZ)	39

=== Year-end charts ===
Chart (2014)	Position
Australian Albums Chart	52

== Certifications ==
Region	Certification	Certified units/sales
Australia (ARIA)	Gold	35,000^{‡}
^{‡} Sales+streaming figures based on certification alone.
