= Feelin Kinda Free =

Studio album by The Drones
- Released: 18 March 2016
- Recorded: 2015–2016
- Studios: TFS Studios, Fitzroy North (Melbourne)
- Genres: Experimental rock; post-punk; punk blues; noise rock; art rock; electronic; industrial rock
- Length: 40:02
- Label: Tropical Fuck Storm Records

The Drones chronology
I See Seaweed (2013)	Feelin Kinda Free (2016)

Singles from Feelin Kinda Free
- 1. "Taman Shud" Released: 12 December 2015; 2. "To Think That I Once Loved You" Released: 19 January 2016

Feelin Kinda Free is the sixth studio album from Australian band The Drones, and their final one before going on hiatus. Having grown tired with the more rock-oriented sound of the band up until that point, frontman Gareth Liddiard became fascinated with both vintage and modern electronic equipment - ranging from drum machines and samplers to the Teenage Engineering OP-1 synthesizer - in conceiving the album's sound. Its genre-defying musical style has been described as visceral and ominous, featuring a relative absence of guitars and a prominent use of electronic textures. Its sessions also marked the first appearance of drummer Christian Strybosch since 2005's Wait Long by the River and the Bodies of Your Enemies Will Float By.

Their shortest at just over 40 minutes, Feelin Kinda Free received fairly positive reviews for its eclectic sound and Liddiard's darker, more politically-charged lyricism. It also charted at #12 on the ARIA Charts - the band's highest to date. The album went on to appear on numerous year-end lists and would later be chosen by Junkee as one of the best Australian albums of the decade.

== Background ==
After the release of I See Seaweed in 2013, Drones founder Gareth Liddiard expressed his desire to step away from the more rock-centric style of previous Drones albums on their next project. "Before we moved to Melbourne back in the 90s," he said in an interview with Musicfeeds, "we were a very weird sounding band. It was Melbourne that turned us more into a rock band, which kind of helped us to get gigs. This is a return to the way we were before in a way – getting drunk, getting stoned, noodling on anything you can find and making weird little songs."

The whole thing was to not have blues guitars in it [...] I’d been listening to really old four-track tapes from the '90s that me and [former The Drones member] Rui [Periera] made, and they’re all totally bizarre. It was almost as though having two guitars playing American-ish, country-ish, blues-ish guitars music – that was a stretch for us. We had to learn how to do that. But just being completely f-cking weird is so natural. It was a relief. Everyone was on [our] side, everyone was cool.

== Recording ==
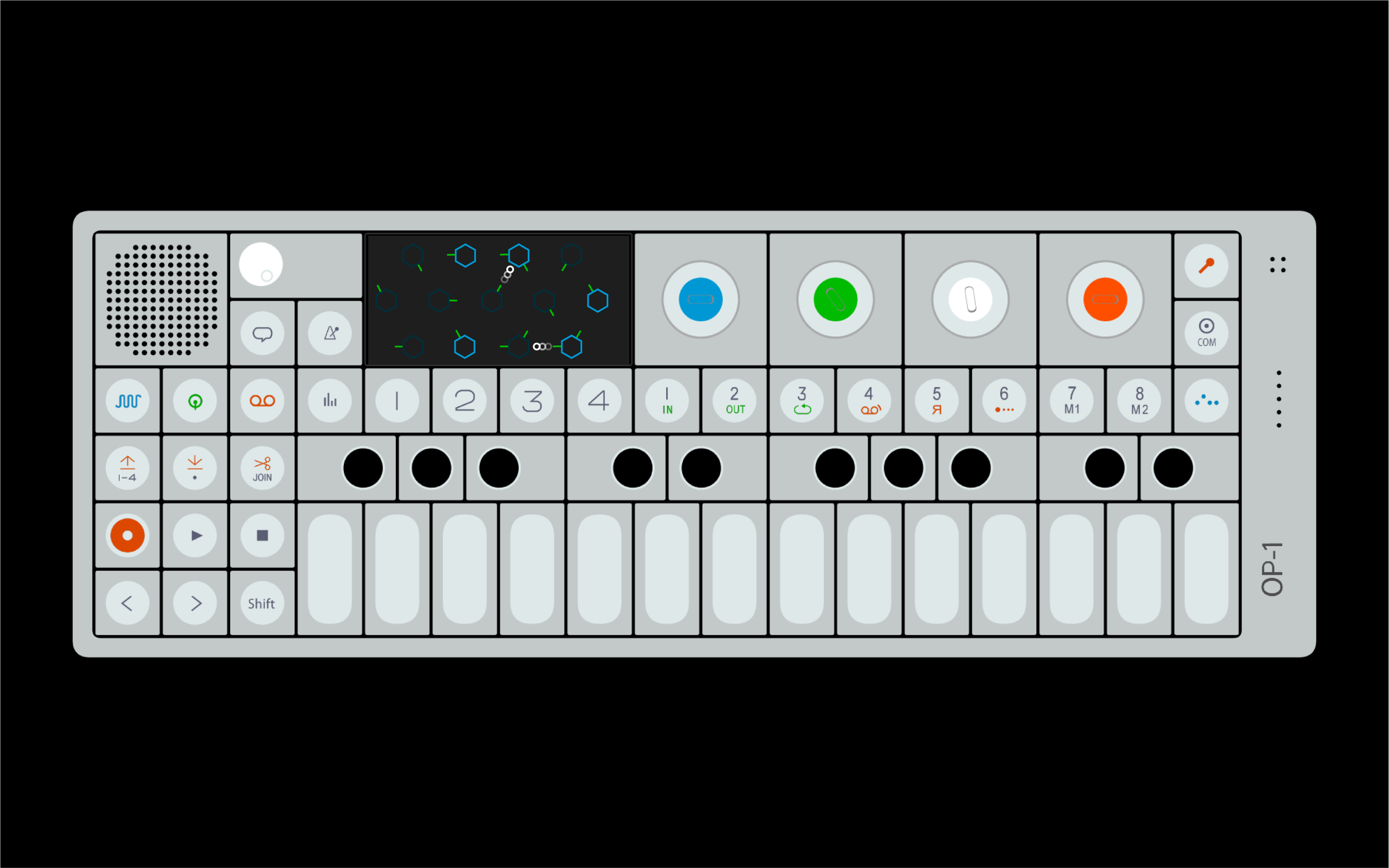
The Teenage Engineering OP-1 synthesizer inspired a lot of the album's textures and sounds

The album, recorded in the band's studio in the Fitzroy North suburb of Melbourne, was mixed on the desk that was reportedly used by Nile Rodgers for Madonna's Like a Virgin. It was mixed by Aaron Cupples, who had previously co-produced 2006's Gala Mill and would go on to mix Tropical Fuck Storm's debut A Laughing Death in Meatspace. Drummer Christian Strybosch, who had previously drummed on the band's first two releases, performs on this album having replaced Mike Noga in 2014.

Liddiard described the genesis of the album's sonic experimentation as follows:

We rented out this studio with a couple of mates. One of those mates, Phil, had stopped being interesting in buying vintage rock & roll equipment. He moved over to buying hip-hop equipment – vintage stuff that acts like Public Enemy or Kool Keith would use. We had all that shit laying around for the first time in our life – synthesizers, samplers, sequencers, stuff like that. He had an OP1, a very modern synth, and I became fascinated with that to the point where I bought my own.

Noting that recording the album had taken them an entire year, Strybosch expanded upon the album's recording process in an interview with Tone Deaf:

Rather than just bashing away at drums and guitars…this time we used more triggers and loops, synth, minimal guitars in places, mixed samples with live…sometimes it’s like working at a little space station. It was conscious in the way that we wanted it to sound different from other (The Drones) records, and I think we achieved that.

Despite this, a majority of the album's effects were, according to Liddiard, generated on guitar.

== Content ==
=== Style ===
"Rock music's been done to death, [...] It's not about using your imagination any more, it's about copying Siouxsie & the Banshees and Joy Division and fitting into that box. The music industry's broke and they only do things that fit into a pigeonhole. A kid starts a band and asks themselves what era they need to rip off. It's just a form of taxidermy."

— Gareth Liddiard in 2016

According to Liddiard: "It's a pretty weird record and you can dance to it...We're sick of being a bunch of drags." The album was described in its press release as "a bad trip you can dance to".

Critics have described the album as "menacing", "ominous" and "visceral". Mischa Pearlman of Record Collector considers it to be "weirder and more twisted than anything they’ve released before." Joe Whyte of Louder Than War noted the incorporation of "krautrock and even funk into the drums and bass although it’s no less unnerving than some of their earlier blizzards of guitar noise." Many critics noted the reduced presence of guitars on the album, with The Guardian writing: "The emphasis is mostly on bass and percussion: guitars are heavily treated; frequently, you’d be forgiven for thinking there are no guitars at all." The "greater variation and eclecticism" in the band's use of Fiona Kitschin's backing vocals (more prominently present on this album) have earned comparisons to that of CocoRosie. The music overall has earned comparisons to older Australian post-punk bands such as Pel Mel, Sardine v and Laughing Clowns, while Mojo likened it to a "Gibby Haynes-fronted Bongwater."

=== Songs ===
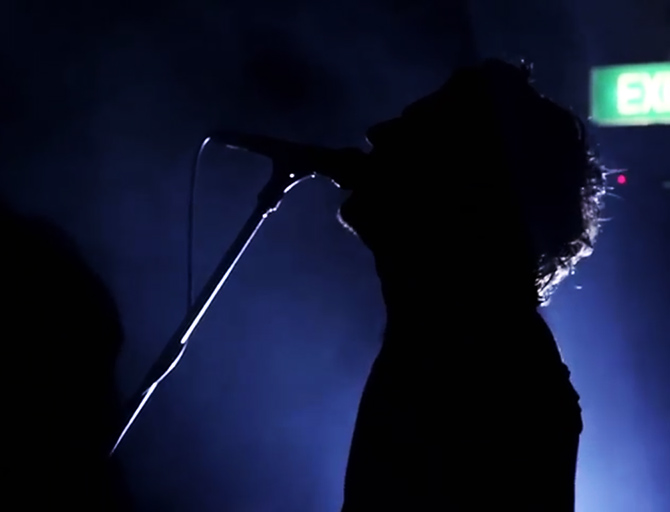
The Drones performing in 2016

The opener "Private Execution" "starts with a familiar cacophony of guitar noise" that "suggests Muse by way of King Crimson" and features "guttural bass lines". The song has been described as "industrial, Sigur Ros-ian post-rock", and the guitars during its ending climax earned comparisons to the "Sicilian strings" from The Godfather soundtrack. Its lyrics explore several themes, including violence in relation to human history, and references the Bali Nine. The following track "Taman Shud" (released as a single) mentions the infamous, unsolved 1948 murder case of the same name, and has been described as "at once a glorious celebration of the best qualities of Australiana and a vitriolic riposte to all that’s ill in the lucky country" Liddiard has described the song as a "big piss off [to those who] try to lay down the rules and the terms, tell you what you have to do to be Australian". The music has been described as "arrythmic", "stark", "jagged" and "simmer(ing) with atonal uneasiness". The lyrics to "Then They Came For Me" references the poem "First they came..." by Martin Niemöller and deals with the subject of immigration from the point of view of a refugee whilst the music has been described as "idiosyncratic" and "anti-anthemic". The song's "high-pitched, airy whistle" effect - mimicking the Jericho trumpets mentioned in its lyrics - was created entirely on guitar. "To Think That I Once Loved You" is "an achingly sad ballad that skilfully treads the line between gentle and unnerving without a misstep" that has been musically described as "icy, downtempo electronica".

The "claustrophobic" track "Tailwind" features "Reflektor-style minimal electronics" with lyrics that deal with obsolescence and irrelevance. Similar to "Then They Came For Me", the song's "singing saw sound" was created on guitar. "Boredom" has been described as being hip hop-influenced with lyrics that "(name-drop) welfare states and Islamic caliphates, prophecising the imminent death of the 'cradle of civilisation' – the Middle East" as well as "describing the drivers of young people joining terrorist organisations, specifically IS" from the perspective of a Muslim teenager living in the Western Suburbs (according to The Monthly, the track is "partly told from the viewpoint of Jake Bilardi [...]"). The chorus on the track has been noted for being similar to "Boredom" by Buzzcocks. The song "Sometimes", featuring lead vocals from Fiona Kitschin, has been described as the "hypothetical missing link between Massive Attack and FKA Twigs", with lyrics that critique modern consumer culture. The closing track "Shut Down SETI" refers to the search for extraterrestrial intelligence in its title and lyrically explores "human savagery from the perspective of an extra terrestrial outsider" as well as motivations of vanity and pride in the guise of "scientific curiosity" which is often used to justify such research. It has been musically described as ""Taman Shud"'s angrier, drunker older brother", with Liddiard and Kitschin's vocals contrasting to create a "two-pronged environment" that culminates in a "finale overture, as though drawing elements from every single prior track on the album." Allmusic noted that the track, "with its surrealistic ranting, sudden stylistic shifts, and white squalls of dissonance, wouldn't have sounded out of place on David Bowie's Blackstar." OndaRock, on the other hand, compared the track to Tom Waits.

== Release ==
The album was released on 18 March 2016 through Tropical Fuck Storm Records. Videos for the tracks "Taman Shud", "Boredom" and "To Think That I Once Loved You" were made available on YouTube.

=== Artwork ===
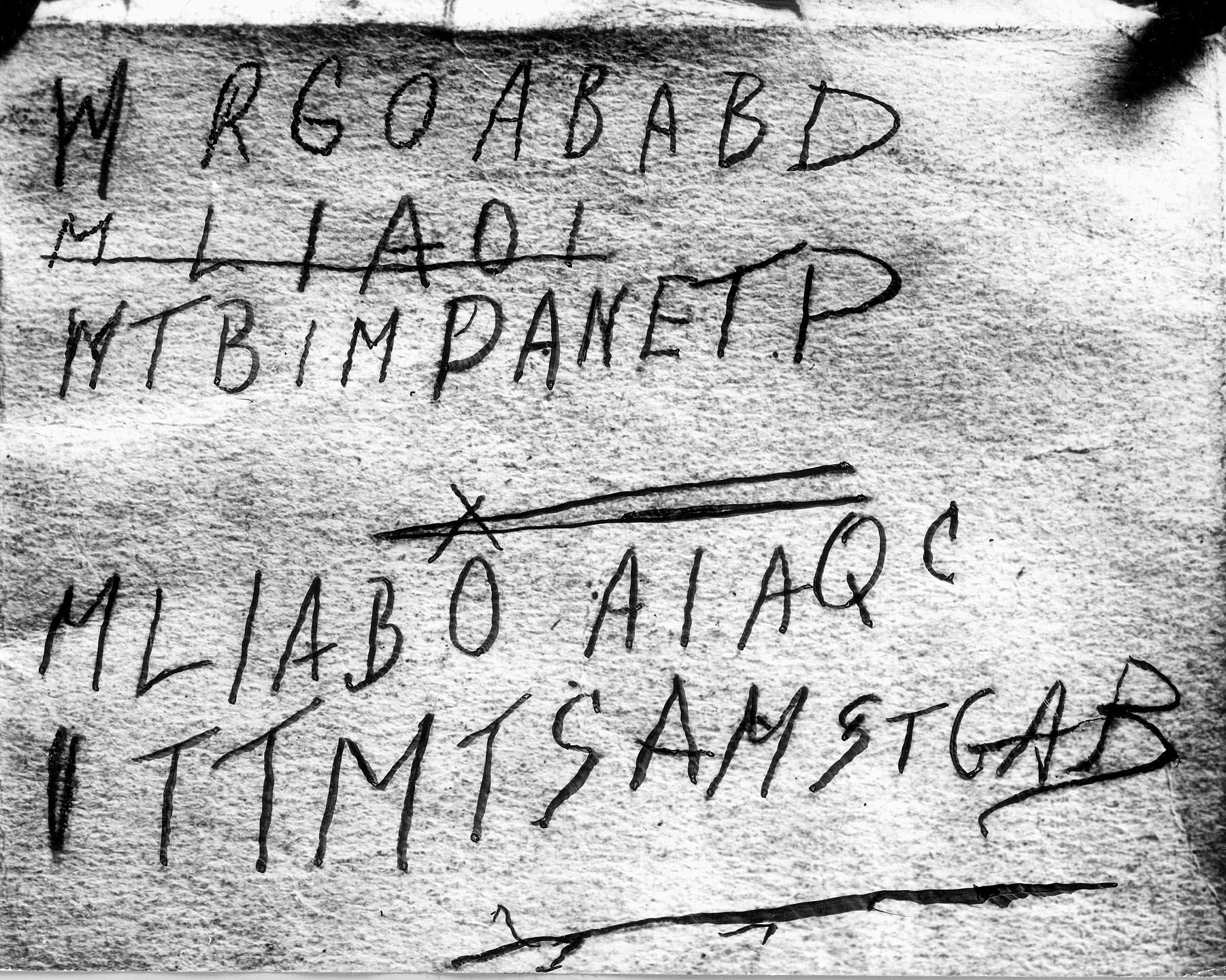
The original unsolved Tamam Shud code.

The cover features the unsolved code from the Tamam Shud case. It was "found written on a scrap of paper – which was ripped from a book found in a random man’s car footwell – which ended up in the pocket of an unidentified corpse on Somerton beach in Adelaide in 1948." Of the incident, Liddiard said: "It’s well known, [...] Everyone in America knows about the whole fucking thing, but no one in Australia is interested in anything Australia".

=== Controversy ===
The single "Taman Shud" - the video for which was released in October 2015 - caused controversy for referencing conservative pundit Andrew Bolt in its lyric "I don’t care about no Andrew Bolt", who later responded by writing that "(the band was) stamping on the ashes of the west’s musical traditions" and that this is proof he was "offending exactly the right kind of people." In response, Liddiard said:

For him it’s a pose: trashing inner-city lefties [sic] indie rock band, saying they’re fucked. He’s keeping up appearances for his fans. Trashing us was a really cynical move. Good on him. Thanks for that Andrew!

== Reception ==
=== Critical ===
Professional ratings
Aggregate scores
Source	Rating
Metacritic	71/100
Review scores
Source	Rating
AllMusic	3.5/5 stars
Drowned in Sound	8/10
The Guardian	4/5 stars
Louder Than War	9/10
Mojo	3/5 stars
Mondo Sonoro	9/10
Ox-Fanzine	4/5 stars
Q	3/5 stars
Record Collector	4/5 stars
Uncut	7/10

The album received a Metacritic score of 71 based on 7 reviews, implying a "generally favorable" critical reception.

Drowned in Sound called it "the best apocalypse soundtrack you’ll ever hear", while The Guardian called it "a menacing, avant-garde interrogation of Australia", going on to write that "sounds like the work of a less dour and far more subversive band." Louder Than War called it "a masterclass in genre-defying rock" in which "no prisoners are taken". According to Record Collector, the album "covers so much ground – musically, thematically, philosophically, politically – that it’s like a lifetime of experiences swirling inside your head simultaneously" calling it "important" in "a modern world ever more tailored to undemanding audiences and reduced attention spans". Calling it the band's best work, Darío García Coto of Spanish magazine Mondo Sonoro praised the band for eschewing their older sound whilst still maintaining their "dirty and corrosive epic" style.

Allmusic was more reserved in its praise, writing that "(it's) certainly not an upbeat listen, nor are its myriad regional allusions easy to parse for non-Australians", despite calling it engaging "on a cerebral level that (is) consistently intoxicating, even at its most lethal." Q gave a more mixed review, calling the album "a mess, but [...] never less than an absorbing one."

=== Contemporary reception and influence ===
Comedians Tom Ballard and James Acaster included Feelin Kinda Free among their favourite albums of 2016.

In 2020, Modest Mouse lead singer Isaac Brock named it one of his 9 favourite albums of all time. "I like them so much that they could actually show up to my house and just crap on me,” Brock said about the band & the album, “I’ve never actually heard anyone do as good a job covering as much distance of what modern politics [sic] and the terror that awaits us in a way that doesn’t sound like political singing". He has also cited the lyric "What do fish know about water?" from the track "Private Execution" as an influence on the lyrics to Modest Mouse's 2021 album The Golden Casket, calling it "a very simple, concise way of saying we don't know what we don't know and there's a lot we don't fucking know."

Many sources have since recognized the album's sound as a precursor to Liddiard's and Kitschin's work in Tropical Fuck Storm.

=== Accolades ===
Publication	Country	Work	Accolade	Year	Rank
Double J	Australia	Feelin Kinda Free	50 Best Albums of 2016	2016	3
Herald Sun	Australia	Feelin Kinda Free	Rock City: The best 16 of '16	2016	3
FasterLouder	Australia	Feelin Kinda Free	50 Best Albums of 2016	2016	7
Gigwise	U.K.	Feelin Kinda Free	51 Best Albums of 2016	2016	10
Mondosonoro	Spain	Feelin Kinda Free	Top International Albums of 2016	2016	10
Rockdelux	Spain	Feelin Kinda Free	Top International Albums of 2016	2016	29
The Guardian	U.K.	"Taman Shud"	Briggs, Camp Cope, the Drones: here are all the great Aussie protest songs	2018	-
Junkee	Australia	Feelin Kinda Free	The 50 Best Australian Albums of the Decade	2019	-

=== Covers & remixes ===
The song "Taman Shud" was covered by Laura Jean (who provides backing vocals on "To Think That I Once Loved You") both live and as a demo, the latter of which appeared on 2017's Thirty Days of Yes mixtape (featuring music from artists championing LGBT marriage equality in Australia).

On 16 March 2018, Boredom Remixes - a 12" EP featuring 4 remixes of the track "Boredom" from Kim Moyes (as K.I.M. and Zero Percent) - was released by his label Here To Hell Records (making it the label's first release). The EP was also made available on Bandcamp.

== Track listing ==
All tracks are written by The Drones.

No.	Title	Length
1.	"Private Execution"	7:11
2.	"Taman Shud"	3:27
3.	"Then They Came for Me"	4:18
4.	"To Think That I Once Loved You"	6:14
5.	"Tailwind"	5:32
6.	"Boredom"	3:23
7.	"Sometimes"	3:56
8.	"Shut Down SETI"	6:01
Total length:		40:02

== Personnel ==
Band

- Gareth Liddiard - guitar, lead vocals
- Fiona Kitschin - bass guitar
- Christian Strybosch - drums
- Steve Hesketh - piano, keyboards
- Dan Luscombe - guitar

Additional Credits

Adapted from liner notes:

- Backing Vocals – Amanda Roff (track: 4), Erica Dunn (tracks: 3, 4), Laura Jean (track: 4), Quinn Veldhuis (track: 4)
- Guitar – Dan Kelly (track: 5)
- Layout – Amy Burrows
- Mastered By – John Davis (track: 4)
- Mixed By – Aaron Cupples, Dan Luscombe
- Recorded By, Mixed By – Gareth Liddiard
- Recorded By – Aaron Cupples (tracks: 1–3, 5–7, 8), Dan Luscombe (tracks: 4, 7)

== Charts ==
Chart (2016)	Peak position
Australian Albums (ARIA)	12
Independent Label Albums	1
