= Live at the Annandale Hotel 18th, 19th October 2007 =

Live album by The Drones
- Released: 2008
- Recorded: 18–19 October 2007, at the Annandale Hotel, Sydney
- Genre: Rock, blues, punk, psychedelic rock
- Label: Annandale Hotel
- Producer: Matthew Rule

The Drones chronology
Live in Spaceland (2007)	Live at the Annandale Hotel 18th, 19th October 2007 (2008)	Havilah (2008)

The Drones performed for two nights at the Annandale Hotel in Sydney, Australia in October 2007. Both nights were recorded with the intention of releasing a limited live album. Live at the Annandale Hotel 18th, 19th October 2007 is the first in a series of live albums produced by the Annandale Hotel music venue. This vinyl-exclusive release was limited to 250 hand-numbered, autographed copies.

== Track listing ==
1. "Jezebel"
2. "Shark Fin Blues"
3. "I'm Here Now"
4. "Locust"
5. "Abortion"
6. "Miller's Daughter"

== Personnel ==
- Gareth Liddiard – vocals, guitar
- Fiona Kitschin – bass
- Dan Luscombe – guitar
- Michael Noga – drums
- Matthew Rule – executive producer
- Burnie Malletin – recording, layout
- Adrian Grigorieff – recording
- Ryan Hazel – mixing
- Rick O'Neil – mastering
- Collin Lucas – photos
