= Work for Me =

Work for Me may refer to:

- "Work for Me", a song by the Drones from the 2006 album Gala Mill
- "Work for Me", a song by Dirty Bee from the 2009 compilation album Fabric 47
- "Work for Me", a 2020 song by Mia Wray
