= Here Come the Lies =

Studio album by the Drones
- Released: August 1, 2002
- Recorded: December 2000 – January 2002
- Genre: Garage rock; noise rock; punk blues; blues rock
- Length: 72:07
- Label: Spooky Records (AUS); Undertow Recordings (EU)
- Producer: Locki Lockwood; Gareth Liddiard

The Drones chronology
The Drones (EP) (2001)	Here Come the Lies (2002)	Wait Long By the River and the Bodies of Your Enemies Will Float By (2005)

Here Come the Lies is the debut album released by Perth band the Drones.

== Content ==
The album is made up of both covers and originals unlike their later releases which would consist almost solely of originals. Rockezine highlighted the noisiness and intensity of the album, writing: "The Drones overdrive their amps to a ridiculous level, strum their strings the hard way and beat the drums in a way unheard-of. This is blues from the gutter. Big city blues, although some call it noise [...] The sound [sways] between a chorus of dissonance and numerous tactical silences, only to emphasize the music even more." The review also made note of the lyrics which makes "the package truly a whole." The music was compared to The Immortal Lee County Killers in its use of "filthy blues to scare the purists away." Popmatters in their review of the band's follow-up quoted a review from a Spanish magazine which described the album as "dirty and authentic [...] pure rock!!". Pitchfork's Brandon Stosuy noted that "[p]laying together for a half-decade has resulted in shivery tightness: Notes bend and expand just as a snare wakes up; the bass adds an exclamation to a vocal line." He went on to compare the band to X, The Gun Club, Scientists and The Birthday Party. Sydney Morning Herald wrote that the album was "designed to be almost unlistenable from start to finish." According to Liddiard himself, the album was recorded "100% live".

Five tracks were previously released in 2001 on their limited release six-track extended play, The Drones, which includes two versions of "Dekalb Blues".

== Release ==
The album was released in August 2002 on Spooky Records. It was later released through Undertow Recordings in Europe. In 2015, the album was reissued as a double 180g vinyl LP on the band's own Tropical Fuck Storm Records, which also included a free digital download of the album plus 12 live tracks. The album was reissued on vinyl again in August 2020 through Bang! Records.

== Reception ==
"Extra special thanks to the ravages of homicidal paranoid schizophrenia, burglary(X2), general theft, cancer, alcohol abuse, grief, kidney infection, gentrification, poverty, auto-anorexia, 2 sets of busted ribs & a busted leg, electrical thunderstorms & pneumonia during rec. sessions, and anyone/anything else that hates us."

— Here Come the Lies liner notes.

AllMusic wrote that the album "is now regarded as an Aussie garage band classic in the same way that recordings by Scientists, Lime Spiders, the Saints, Beasts of Bourbon, Died Pretty (Free Dirt), and even Radio Birdman have been heralded." PopMatters called the album "fierce and raw". The now defunct Rockezine gave the album an 8/10, criticizing the length as being "[a]bout 20 minutes too long [...] mainly due to the jam-like structure the band uses for songwriting" despite calling the album "a nice adventure".

Gareth Liddiard would later describe the album as "horrible depressing noise", despite singling out "I Walked Across the Dam" as a song he was the "most proud of" calling it "a good song. I think it’s just too long and too psychopathic for most people. I think it’s good. The band sounds good."

Amanda Roff of Harmony, who would later perform with the band live and on the albums I See Seaweed and Feelin Kinda Free, named it one the 10 best Australian rock albums of all time in a poll conducted by The Age.

== Track listing ==
1. The Cockeyed Lowlife of the Highlands" - 3:41
2. "Dekalb Blues" (Lead Belly cover^) - 5:06
3. "The Downbound Train" (Chuck Berry cover) - 7:50
4. "I'd Been Told" - 7:02
5. "New Kind of Kick" (The Cramps cover) - 4:28
6. "I Walked Across the Dam" - 8:06
7. "Motherless Children" (Blind Willie Johnson cover) - 4:58
8. "Hell and Haydevils" - 8:02
9. "The Scrap Iron Sky" - 4:47
10. "The Island" - 5:13
11. "Six Ways to Sunday" - 7:20
12. "The Country of Love" - 5:34

^(Incorporates parts of "See See Rider" by Ma Rainey)

== Personnel ==
Adapted from Discogs:

The Drones

- Gareth Liddiard – guitar, Hammond organ, piano, zipsichord, percussion, lead vocals, producer, engineer, mixing
- Rui Pereira – guitar, zipsichord, percussion, backing vocals
- Fiona Kitschin – bass, harmonium, backing vocals
- Christian Strybosch – drums

Additional musicians

- Craig Williamson – percussion on "Dekalb Blues"
- Matt Heydon – piano on "New Kind of Kick"

Production

- Loki Lockwood – producer; assistant engineer and mixing (tracks 1, 3, 5, 6, 8, 9, 12)
- Dave McCluney – engineer; mixing (tracks 2, 4, 7, 10, 11)
- Martin Pullan – mastering
- Mikey Young – mastering for 2015 reissue
- Amy Burrows – layout
- Andrew Watson, Tim Hegarty – photography
