= The Miller's Daughter (album) =

Compilation album by the Drones
- Released: 2005
- Recorded: 1999–2004
- Studio: Atlantis Studios (Melbourne)
- Genre: Punk blues; garage rock; noise rock
- Length: 54:02
- Label: Fuse (Australia); Bang! (UK/Europe)
- Producer: Locki Lockwood; Gareth Liddiard; The Drones

The Drones chronology
Wait Long By the River and the Bodies of Your Enemies Will Float By (2005)	The Miller's Daughter (2005)	Gala Mill (2006)

The Miller's Daughter is a compilation album released by Perth band the Drones. The album compiles outtakes from the band's first two full-length releases (Here Come the Lies and Wait Long By the River and the Bodies of Your Enemies Will Float By) and their first few non-album singles.

== Background ==
Of the album, Liddiard said:

"This isn't really an outtakes or b-side record...its just that when we recorded 'Here Come The Lies' and 'Wait Long By The River' we did them six months apart and we had a huge pile of songs....those two records were both really long and we had to ditch some of the stuff we were doing to keep them reasonably timed....most of the stuff is recorded straight up live in the studio....so basically if I f--ked up a lyric it didn't go on the record. we didn't have the time or money or patience to correct anything....all I can remember about these sessions is just being tired and drunk and hoarse and broke and way too loud for a recording studio...it seems like 20 years ago. But I really like this record...it's got everything I like about rock n roll in there so I'm totally cool with it..... even though it's a little messy and rushed. Lots of people think we are s--t and I hope this makes them think we are even worse after hearing it cause we are just doing our thing and doing a thorough job of it......I hate to sound trite but this is what we think punk sounds like you know??? and any band worth anything knows that you are just there take what you think is most valuable in good music and then show it to everybody... kinda pervert it a little to suit... then you try to enjoy it more than everyone else."

== Content ==
In the record liner notes, Liddiard provides the following quoted descriptions for each song:

- "Someone on Your Bond" - "name kinda taken from a Blind Willie Johnson song, the last contract you'll ever make.... so don't fuck it up. wait long sessions."
- "Bird in a Church" - "people who sing or have sung that dreadful song "sometimes I feel like a motherless child" should be killed. simple. came out as the A-side of a 7" issued by infidelity records 2003ish."
- "Well Well Well" – "you know the joke. John and Yoko. wait long sessions.
- "She Had an Abortion That She Made Me Pay For" - "regrets, I've had a few... Brendon plays bass, Crisso has pneumonia. recorded September 2000 at Cavalier Studios in Research (???). then it just sat there."
- "The Miller's Daughter" - "I think a couple of these lines appear in a song "Death on the Installment Plan" by Louis-Ferdinand Céline. kind of up back somewhere. it may be part of a real song, who knows. I made the rest up."
- "I Believe" - "based on an Alan Vega song of the same name, Coltrane's 'A Love Supreme', a Blind Willie Johnson song I can't recall and a couple of lines some bloke was singing to himself on the street... Warren on drums, Rui on Hammond and Zipzichord, and me and James on guitars. recorded in our lounge room in east perth 1999."
- "Meanstreak" - "you can't put a .303 against your forehead without first removing your shoes, everyone knows that. here come the lies sessions."
- "Slammin' On The Brakes" - "real showbiz this... I'm talking about the end. oldest trick in the book that one!! a Spencer Jones masterpiece. came out as a B-side to "Bird In A Church" around 2003??"
- "Henry Ford" - "unfinished recording of an unrecorded, finished song. containing the greatest analogy for the eternal question in song today...... 'G.M.H or Henry Ford?'"
- "Stop Dreaming" - "name taken from John Lee Hooker song called that or something else.... the best advice in the world really. wait long sessions."
- "The City" - "spot where tape runs out. here come the lies sessions."

== Release ==
The album was released through Fuse Records in Australia and through the Spanish label Bang! Records (that specializes in similar punk blues recordings from Australia and the U.S.) in Europe. It was also released as a limited (500 copies) vinyl edition and includes an extra track, a cover of "Well Well Well" by John Lennon.

== Reception ==
Professional ratings
Review scores
Source	Rating
Ox-Fanzine	9/10

The German punk zine Ox-Fanzine reviewed the album on their 64th issue, published in early 2006. The reviewer Claus Wittwer scored the album a 9/10, calling it "much better [...] wilder and more rampant" than the band's previous releases from whose sessions most of these outtakes were culled, calling the vocals "emotionally charged and highly explosive [...] Frontman Gareth Liddiard seems to live what he sings." The Aquarian Weekly wrote that the band's "misbegotten third album, [...] offered menacingly provocative fare such as audacious fetus-scraping lampoon, “She Had An Abortion That She Made Me Pay For.”" Everett True described the "deranged" title track as "a Mercy Seat for the noughties" whilst God Is in the TV called it "mercurial" and "majestic".

== Track listing ==
All songs written by the Drones, except where noted.

1. "Someone On Your Bond" - 2:25
2. "Bird In A Church" - 3:00
3. "Well Well Well" [*] (John Lennon) - 4:22
4. "She Had An Abortion That She Made Me Pay For" - 5:03
5. "The Miller's Daughter" - 6:48
6. "I Believe" - 6:58
7. "Mean Streak" - 4:41
8. "Slammin' On The Brakes" (Spencer P. Jones) - 5:07
9. "Henry Ford" - 5:42
10. "Stop Dreaming" - 4:17
11. "The City" - 10:07

[*] Included only on limited edition vinyl release.

== Personnel ==
The Drones

- Gareth Liddiard – vocals, guitar, keyboards, liner notes
- Rui Pereira – guitar, keyboards; Hammond organ and Zipzichord on "I Believe"
- Fiona Kitschin – bass
- Christian Strybosch – drums
- Brendon Humphries – bass on "She Had an Abortion That She Made Me Pay For"
- James McCann – guitar on "I Believe"
- Warren Hall – drums on "I Believe"

Additional musician

- Steve Hesketh – Hammond organ, Wurlitzer electric piano on "Stop Dreaming"

Production

- Locki Lockwood, Gareth Liddiard – production (tracks 1, 2, 3, 7, 8, 10)
- The Drones – production (tracks 4, 5, 6, 9, 11)
- Dave McCluney – recording engineer
- Dave Tacon – cover photo
- Daniel Campbell, Tim Hegarty – additional photography
- The Downie Breitkreuz Group – design
