= Nine Eyes =

Nine Eyes or 9-Eyes may refer to:

== Organisations ==
- Nine Eyes (signals intelligence), an enlargement of the Five Eyes intelligence alliance of countries
- Intelligence School 9 or Nine Eyes, a part of the British Government which recruited Christiaan Lindemans

== Arts and entertainment ==
- "Nine Eyes", a song on the album I See Seaweed by The Drones
- "9-Eye", a pre-show of the film The Timekeeper
- "9-Eyes", an exhibition of Google Street View images by Jon Rafman

== Other uses ==
- Mataiva ("Nine Eyes" in Tuamotuan), a coral atoll
