= Havilah (album) =

1998 studio album by The Drones

Studio album by The Drones
- Released: 20 September 2008
- Recorded: April 2008
- Studios: Running Creek, Myrtleford (Victoria)
- Genres: Punk blues; garage rock; folk rock; noise rock
- Length: 53:23
- Label: ATP/MGM
- Producers: Burke Reid; the Drones

The Drones chronology
Live at the Annandale Hotel 18th, 19 October 2007 (2008)	Havilah (2008)	A Thousand Mistakes (2011)

Singles from Havilah
- 1. "The Minotaur" Released: 29 July 2008

Havilah is the fourth studio album by Australian alternative rock band the Drones, which was released by ATP Recordings/MGM Distribution in September 2008. It was co-produced by the group with Burke Reid and issued in February 2009 for the United Kingdom and United States markets. The title refers to a biblical town of the same name – "a Shangri-La-esque place with an abundance of gold" – and is the valley 20 kilometres (12 miles) from Myrtleford, where they recorded.

At the J Awards of 2008, the album was nominated for Australian Album of the Year. In 2011, it would be voted by the band's contemporaries & "industry experts" as the 38th best Australian album of all time.

== Background ==
Havilah was recorded in April 2008 by the Drones at the mud-brick home of their bass guitarist, Fiona Kitschin, and lead singer, Gareth Liddiard. It is located 20 km (12 mi) east of Myrtleford at the base of Victoria's Mount Buffalo. Liddiard reflected:

It's like a little world unto itself in the forest. It's a beautiful place. You can't always find a good spot to record, but if you can find a house like this that's a bonus. It was a great place to write and record. We were literally in the middle of a sub-alpine forest. We had no electricity, just diesel generators. It'd be just about the only record made on a diesel budget.

Dan Luscombe, the lead guitarist, explained its title, "Havilah is the name of the town where we recorded the album… our nearest neighbour was 4 km away. In fact, this Victorian town was once a gold rush town populated with thousands of people just before the turn of the 20th century. It is now fitted out with about 30 people, and on this note, touches of Australian history are filling this album before we have even heard it."

The album was produced and engineered by Burke Reid (The Mess Hall, Gerling) who set up his portable ProTools studio, the Running Creek Studios, in their home, powered by a diesel engine.

== Content and composition ==
The music on the album has been described as being influenced by "30 years of left-field rock heroics (the Birthday Party, Sonic Youth, the noisiest bits of Neil Young)" as well as "fellow Aussies Nick Cave and The Triffids' late David McComb"

To shake up his lyric writing, Liddiard was reading four books at once, and using internet packages to jumble words and create unimaginable phrases – similar to the labour intensive "cut up" techniques employed by writer William S. Burroughs and singer David Bowie in the pre-Internet era, where they cut up words on paper and jumbled them up:

I made a conscious effort to put my head in the sand. You start working, you have a coffee in the morning, and any self-doubt falls away.

According to The Guardian, the lyrics on the album consist of "allegorical tales of Minotaurs, cargo cults and slow-creep apocalypse" with many tracks dealing with topics such as "marital woes" ("The Drifting Housewife") and "emptiness" ("Careful As You Go")

== Release ==
The first single from the album, "The Minotaur", was released ahead of the album in July 2008. Havilah debuted at No. 47 on the ARIA Albums Chart.

== Reception ==
Professional ratings
Aggregate scores
Source	Rating
AnyDecentMusic?	7.4/10
Metacritic	77/100
Review scores
Source	Rating
AllMusic	4.0/5 stars
The Guardian	5/5 stars
Mojo	4/5 stars
Mondosonoro	8/10
NME	7/10 stars
Ox-Fanzine	5/5 stars
Pitchfork	7.7/10
PopMatters	8/10 stars
Q	3/5 stars
Tiny Mix Tapes	5/5 stars

=== National ===
The Age's Patrick Donovan observed, "the band's angry cacophony has partly given way to a cleaner, more upbeat sound with more melody and narrative-based songs... Elsewhere, the band's country influences come to the fore, as well as the cleaner playing of new guitarist Dan Luscombe... [they] may have mellowed a bit, but they're no less engaging."

=== International ===
On Metacritic, the album has a "metascore" of 77 based on 15 reviews, implying a "generally favorable" critical reception, whilst it has a score of 7.4 out of 10 on the review aggregator AnyDecentMusic? based on 11 reviews.

Tom Hughes of The Guardian called it an "outstanding record, and one with endless pleasures and pains to be wrung out of it" calling Liddiard "one of the few rock lyricists worth paying real attention to" adding that "he's a vocalist like no other, [...] his melodic ear never better than here". Tiny Mix Tapes called the album "more humblingly [sic] good music at a time when rock music is more about being it’s-all-been-done humble", bemoaning their lack of popularity and adding that theirs "is the sound you need to get for right now, and it’s built to last well past that.". Dan Draper of PopMatters wrote that the album finds the band "older, more bitter, and better than ever" calling Liddiard "one of those lyricists whose words have the weight of poetry" Ned Raggett of AllMusic rated it at four-out-of-five stars and explained, "[they] have grown a touch more polished and focused with time, it's not at the expense of creating compelling music – if anything, [this album] even more clearly places the band as one of Australia's best rock bands ever." Joe Colly of Pitchfork writes that "They're traditional in the way Black Lips are-- straightforward instrumentation, a healthy nod to the past-- but manage to dodge the pitfalls of revisionism with an unusual mixture of brute force, bleak lyrical content, and singer Gareth Liddiard's distinctive caterwaul. (Dude can impressively shift from a bark to a shriek to a roar in one solitary breath.) [...Listening to the album] is like making it through a powerful-but-disturbing film".

More mixed reviews came from Q who said it was a "little too heavily indebted to fellow Aussies Nick Cave and The Triffids' late David McComb, even if that's not a bad place to be coming form." Prefix magazine described it as "thickset blues rock" that "makes for opaque and impenetrable listening" decrying their perceived lack of innovation (in comparison to acts such as Women and Abe Vigoda) and their inability to "wallow in the same gloriously gloomy lows as, say, Come’s Eleven:Eleven or Neil Young's On the Beach" comparing the music to the "mid level depress-o-rock that The Smashing Pumpkins have been peddling on-and-off for the best part of two decades" and criticizing Liddiard's lyrics as "too often uninspired, and seemingly torn from a notebook full of juvenilia that should have been stuffed in the back of a firmly locked closet" despite being "witty" at parts

=== Awards and nominations ===
Havilah was one of 12 nominees at the J Awards of 2008 for Album of the Year. It was also nominated for the Australian Music Prize of 2008 (losing out to Primary Colours by Eddy Current Suppression Ring), making it the band's third nomination for the prize since its inauguration in 2005.

=== Accolades ===
Publication	Country	Year	Accolade	Rank
The Age	Australia	2008	The year that was (Craig Mathieson)	1
Inpress	Australia	2008	Top 10 Albums of 2008	4
The Guardian	UK	2009	Critics' poll 2009	42
Triple J	Australia	2011	Hottest 100 Australian Albums of all Time	38

== Track listing ==
All tracks are written by Gareth Liddiard, Mike Noga, Dan Luscombe and Fiona Kitschin, unless otherwise noted

Havilah Australian release (ATPRCD31)
No.	Title	Length
1.	"Nail It Down"	6:53
2.	"The Minotaur"	3:25
3.	"The Drifting Housewife"	4:01
4.	"I Am the Supercargo" (Liddiard, Luscombe)	6:20
5.	"Careful as You Go" (Liddiard, Luscombe, Kitschin)	5:02
6.	"Oh My"	4:43
7.	"Cold and Sober" (Liddiard)	5:05
8.	"Luck in Odd Numbers"	8:36
9.	"Penumbra" (Liddiard)	3:53
10.	"Your Acting's Like the End of the World"	5:21

== Personnel ==
The Drones

- Fiona Kitschin – bass guitar, backing vocals
- Gareth Liddiard – guitar, lead vocals
- Dan Luscombe – guitar, piano, melodica, backing vocals
- Mike Noga – drums, percussion, backing vocals

Recording details

- Burke Reid, the Drones – producer at Running Creek Studios, Havilah, Victoria
- Bruce Reid – audio engineer
- Ross Cockle – mastering engineer

== Charts ==
Chart (2008)	Peak position
ARIA Albums Chart	47
