= Live in Spaceland =

Spaceland Presents – The Drones (In Spaceland • Nov. 15th, 2006)

Live album by The Drones
- Released: 2 February 2007
- Recorded: 15 November 2006
- Venues: Spaceland, Silver Lake, CA
- Genres: Garage rock; punk blues; post-punk
- Length: 66:21
- Labels: Spaceland; Kufala
- Producers: Ed Goodreau; KamranV

The Drones chronology
| Gala Mill (2006) | Spaceland Presents – The Drones (In Spaceland • Nov. 15th, 2006) (2007) | Live at the Annandale Hotel 18th, 19th October 2007 (2008) |

Spaceland Presents – The Drones (In Spaceland • Nov. 15th, 2006), or Live in Spaceland, is the first live album by Australian alternative rockers, the Drones, which was released in February 2007 via the American label, Spaceland Recordings. Its ten tracks were recorded at Spaceland, an alternative rock/indie rock nightclub in the Silver Lake neighbourhood of Los Angeles, on 15 November 2006, as part of NME's Wednesday night concert series. The band performed without a setlist.

== Reception ==
Professional ratings
Review scores
| Source | Rating |
|---|---|
| PopMatters | 6/10 stars |

PopMatters gave the album an indifferent review, calling it a "fairly unspectacular" effort that was "not recorded with the strongest material, or when the Drones are at their best", even saying it was a "step back" from their "unhinged and visceral studio sound", despite being a "noble attempt".

== Track listing ==
1. "Sitting on the Edge of the Bed Cryin'"
2. "She Had an Abortion that She Made Me Pay For"
3. "This Time"
4. "Sharkfin Blues"
5. "I'm Here Now"
6. "Six Ways to Sunday"
7. "Dog Eared"
8. "I Don't Never Wanna Change"
9. "The Miller's Daughter"
10. "The Downbound Train" (Chuck Berry)

== Credits ==
Adapted from Discogs:

The Drones

- Gareth Liddiard – guitar, vocals
- Rui Pereira – guitar
- Fiona Kitschin – bass guitar
- Mike Noga – drums

Production

- Ed Goodreau – producer, mixer
- Kamran Valanejad – producer, executive producer, recording engineer
- Scott Cornish – recording engineer
- Mitchell Frank – executive producer
- Henrik Jacobsson – mastering
- Option-g, Alexandra Lahr – artwork
