= Shark Fin Blues =

2005 single by the Drones

Single by The Drones

from the album Wait Long by the River and the Bodies of Your Enemies Will Float By
- Released: 27 March 2005
- Recorded: 2005
- Genre: Punk blues, garage rock
- Length: 9:14
- Label: ATP; In-Fidelity
- Songwriters: Gareth Liddiard, Rui Pereira

The Drones singles chronology
"Bird in a Church" (2002)	"Shark Fin Blues" (2005)	"Jezebel" (2006)

"Shark Fin Blues" is a double A-side single taken from Australian rockers the Drones' second studio album, Wait Long by the River and the Bodies of Your Enemies Will Float By (April 2005). The single was released on 25 September 2006. It also appeared as a limited edition, 7" picture disc, together with the band's fourth album, Gala Mill (September 2006).

The band's most popular song, "Shark Fin Blues" - "an anthem of sorts for the disenfranchised and melancholic" written after the passing of lead singer Gareth Liddiard's mother - was voted the greatest Australian song of all time by the band's contemporaries in 2009 and is now widely considered to be a classic.

== Composition ==
The song starts off "hazy" and "distorted" over "restrained drumming" and gradually builds up, "expanding and filling with screeching guitars and a contagious chorus of "na na na’s"". The instrumentation on this track has been described as "jarring" while Liddiard's vocals have been described as "brutal". Liddiard describes the intro as a "fudged Townes Van Zandt riff" whilst the outro was improvised by Rui Pereira.

The song, whose lyrics were written over "Same Old Man" by Karen Dalton, was composed after the passing of Liddiard's mother and has been described as "an anthem of sorts for the disenfranchised and melancholic". The allegorical lyrics contain biblical and maritime imagery and has been compared to The Rime of the Ancient Mariner, its protagonist describing the sinking of his ship as the titular "sharks" surround him "fin by fin".

== Reception ==
=== Critical ===
The song was originally received favorably, with Brandon Stosuy of Pitchfork calling it "one of the best rockers of the year, a seemingly endless path of riffs and dynamics and a good introduction to Liddiard's nihilistic subject matter". Mike Diver of Drowned in Sound was more mixed in his assessment, calling it "a decent composition executed decently, but far from the original blast of frazzled blues it wishes to be", comparing it unfavorably to the band's live performances.

=== Legacy ===
"It felt like an anthem to the kind of people that need one more than anyone else, [...] The kind that can’t pull themselves out from that murky, lonely sludge that lives in their head, my head."

— Rachael Dease of Schvendes on "Shark Fin Blues"

In a poll of contemporary Australian songwriters in 2009, organised by national youth broadcaster Triple J, "Shark Fin Blues" was voted as the greatest Australian song of all time. On being asked about the ranking the following year by Andrew McMillen, Liddiard expressed ambivalence, speculating that many of those voting may have been "5-6 years younger" than the band members themselves. In the same interview, he also states that he is "sick to fuckin' death of" playing the song live, despite conceding that "[t]here’s nothing you can do about that, really. I’m always saying, "Let’s fuck 'Shark Fin' off, we don’t have to do it!”, but it’s the band who probably want to hear it more than anyone else. I don’t know why."

In 2014, Denham Sadler of The Guardian wrote that "part of the song’s power is that Liddiard refuses to provide the listener a throwaway silver lining [...] instead it is a raw and brutally honest account of depression [...] a song that unflinchingly bares its writer’s despair, detailed in an intimate, introspective way." The following year, The Sydney Morning Herald observed that the song is "considered by many to be an Australian classic." In November 2020, Junkee ranked the song 5th on their list of "The 200 Greatest Australian Songs of All Time" - a list that partially takes into account submissions from other Australian musicians.

== Track listing ==
1. "Shark Fin Blues" - 4:34
2. "You Really Don't Care" - 4:40

== Missy Higgins version ==
"Shark Fin Blues"

Single by Missy Higgins

from the album Oz
- Released: 7 July 2014
- Genre: pop
- Length: 5:16
- Label: Eleven
- Songwriters: Gareth Liddiard, Rui Pereira

Missy Higgins singles chronology
"We Ride" (2013)	"Shark Fin Blues" (2014)	"Oh Canada" (2016)

On 7 July 2014, Australian artist Missy Higgins released "Shark Fin Blues" as the first single from her fourth studio album, Oz (September 2014). It debuted at number No. 71 on the ARIA Singles Chart on the week commencing 18 August.

The video clip was released via YouTube on 11 August.

=== Reception ===
In an album review, Helena Ho from Renowned for Sound said the song "begins with simple piano chords so that the bare beauty of Higgins' vocals are highlighted. She sings with such passion and emotion, you can hear her voice tremble with it. It's liberating when the strings and piano eventually swell together for the final hook."

Ali Birnie from Beat Magazine said the song is the album highlight.
