= I See Seaweed =

Studio album by The Drones
- Released: 1 March 2013
- Recorded: 2012–2013
- Studio: Home studio, Nagambie (Victoria)
- Genre: Art rock; punk blues; noise rock
- Length: 52:21
- Label: Self-released/MGM
- Producer: Gareth Liddiard, Burke Reid & John Roberto

The Drones chronology
A Thousand Mistakes (2011)	I See Seaweed (2013)	Feelin Kinda Free (2016)

Singles from I See Seaweed
- 1. "How to See Through Fog" Released: 1 February 2013

I See Seaweed is the fifth studio album by Australian band The Drones, released in March 2013. The album marked the first appearance of Steve Hesketh on keyboards (hence making the band a quintet) and the last appearance of drummer Mike Noga. Recorded by the band themselves inside a "demountable classroom from the '60s", the music on the album is more dynamic, darker and "expansive" in comparison to previous albums, while Liddiard's poetic lyrics were regarded as being more "universal" and humorous in exploring topics such as climate change, free will, conservative politics, socioeconomic issues, existentialism and the human condition in general. The song "How to See Through Fog" was released as the album's only single in early 2013.

Released independently, the album was co-distributed through Waterfront Records. It received rave reviews from the Australian press, and has been called "a significant moment in Australian rock music, [...] for the stark, beautiful and often menacing way it frames and comments upon a culturally specific moment." It ended up topping over a hundred The Music critics' year-end lists, among many others, also becoming their first to enter the ARIA Charts' top 20. Its reception outside Australia, despite being scant, was highly positive in nature and it would go on to be praised by writers and critics in the years following its release. The album received a number of award nominations, and its tracks have been covered by the likes of Kirin J. Callinan.

== Recording ==
I See Seaweed is the first Drones album to feature Steve Hesketh on keyboards, who would go on to become a permanent member, appearing in the band's follow-up album Feelin Kinda Free. It would also be the last appearance of Mike Noga on a Drones album, who would go on to focus more on his solo career, being replaced by original Drones drummer Chris Strybosch the following year.

The album was recorded inside a disused, "demountable" classroom from the 1960s that Liddiard had renovated for "ten grand" (it would subsequently be converted into a kitchen). He said: "It’s big, 11 by nine metres, hardwood floor, the ceiling’s about 3.5m tall and there’s windows down both sides – a lot of glass and shiny surfaces. We renovated that up [...] we bought a bunch of cheap and nasty velvet curtains off eBay and threw a Persian rug or two in there and it ended up sounding really good. It was a big open space and we all went in there with the amps, or sometimes set them up outside under the house, or in a bedroom nearby. We would all sit in the room with cans around the drums, and most of the singing is live so it’s feeding into the drum mics and vice versa, otherwise it’s all isolated". The sessions marked the first time that the band engineered their own sessions in a "group effort". Liddiard compared their use of noise on the album to the "sound of a car crash", saying: "You mimic. As long as the noise you’re making reflects what’s currently a noise that’s naturally out there, then I think it’s a valid noise".

== Content ==
=== Style ===
Louder Than War wrote that the album "had a more filmic, widescreen feel and was not unlike some of Nick Cave and Mick Harvey's scores", whilst the "rawness" of the music earned comparisons to that of early PJ Harvey. The album was considered to be more "expansive" than previous Drones albums, with many pointing out the contributions of new member Steve Hesketh. Chad Parkhill of The Quietus writes that his "piano and keyboard work seems not so much to add startlingly new elements to the band's songs but to allow them to develop their artier ambitions" going on to write that "additional textural detail [...] allows the songs to rely less on bludgeoning loud/soft contrasts than in the past." Alex Griffin of Tiny Mix Tapes writes that the record comes "with more dread-filled hopelessness than an entire tent of doomed Arctic explorers, while somehow remaining more elliptical and brutal than anything else they’ve released, moving with a mixture of reckless uncertainty and whiplash dynamism that makes “Jezebel" feel like breakfast cereal". Chris Gridler of Beat writes that while the band's previous releases were "entrenched in the surrounding landscape and its people", on this album they "branch out and move to more universal themes" despite retaining their "strong sense of place". Andrew McMillen of Rolling Stone writes that the album contains "cracks of beauty and humour amid the darkness".

=== Songs ===
The opening title track "alludes to rising seas and overpopulation" and features "a melancholic verse" that "crescendoes into an explosive refrain later totally downcast in the bridge" and has been called their "heaviest song – lyrically and musically" since the aforementioned "Jezebel". The song "begins as a tragic story of youth until, in a deft and devastating transition, everyone on earth is lassoed into complicity." The second track "How To See Through Fog", the sole single released from the album, contains a "particularly arresting" piano melody. The song is "about anti-conformity or, at least, an existential ideal of self-determination", whose narrator is "revealed as insecure and indecisive."

"They'll Kill You", the following track, "details the failures that twenty-something Australian emigrants encounter when they try and escape reality by positing a greater one beyond that country’s borders. The cracking of illusion is painted in the way the chord progression yields and opens to a seasick lurch down the scale in the bridge, sliding like the point in an argument where things start getting thrown, and sinking towards the inevitable conclusion: "this birdhouse migrates too"" and has been described as "devastating". The narrator on this track, in comparison to the "lost cause" of the previous track, is "going down fighting" and the song "tap[s] into the big, ugly emotions that have felled – and fuelled –most of us, like grief, disempowerment and regret." "A Moat You Can Stand In" harks back to the band's earlier, noisy style and "lays the boot into Alan Jones, Andrew Bolt and other demagogues doing their best to destabilise the current (Australian) government", also described as being "hilarious" in its "skewering" of these topics.

"Nine Eyes", the following track, features semi-autobiographical lyrics that finds "Liddiard using Google Street view to observe the socioeconomic damage wrought on his home town of Port Hedland by "cashed-up bogan" mine workers" and has been described as "equal parts disturbing and funny". Liddiard's vocal delivery on the track's chorus has been described as "unhinged a la Kurtz in Conrad's Heart Of Darkness". "The Grey Leader" "eviscerates the hypocrisy of Australia's conservative politicians". In an interview with Beat magazine, Liddiard revealed that he had written the song with Tony Abbott in mind. The song's refrain, "Nothing will ever change your mind", "sums up life’s intransigence and how little we can influence any of it." The following track "Laika" details "the story of a dog shot into space as part of the controversial Russian space trials of the '50s" and has been described as "the most haunting tune on the album. Its curious use of piano, sudden orchestral boost and harmonizing female choir result in full-on cinematic grandeur that's fairly distant from the group's usual aesthetics, if never less commanding." Liddiard described the song as "an allegory for the lack of free will, in a philosophical, biological sense."

The final track "Why Write A Letter That You'll Never Send" has been described as "fiery", building from "a gentle acoustic intro [...] to its halfway point" before "erupting into a rant about everything from the holocaust to the Vatican, even wily a dig at Band Aid". The song "has plenty of zingers, but the structure of the song reveals that they're equally self-directed". Mixdown magazine writes that the song "link[s] increasing technological isolation to the loss of letter writing, detachment from politics to celebrity stardom, failed dreams to a failing society, learning nothing from catastrophe to the valorisation of war and humanity’s ultimate failure." The article also identifies elements of list song, references to Henry Timrod's "To Captive Owl" and to Ode on a Grecian Urn in the song's lyrics. The song has been musically compared to the works of Robert Wyatt.

=== Artwork ===
The album's cover features a photograph of a Hawaiian lava flow entering the water. The shot is taken down the 'tube' of a breaking wave, by photographer CJ Kale, who was roughly 20 feet (6 metres) from the point that the lava was entering the water.

== Release ==
Self-released on 1 March 2013, the album was co-distributed through Waterfront Records. Liddiard cited signs of ATP Recordings' imminent financial collapse as the reason behind their decision to self-release the album. The "Official Film Clip" for the title track, made in collaboration with Amiel Courtin-Wilson, was released through the band's official channel (now Tropical Fuck Storm Records) on 4 September 2013.

== Reception ==
=== Critical ===
Professional ratings
Review scores
Source	Rating
The Big Issue	4/5 stars
The Examiner	4/5 stars
FasterLouder	9/10
OndaRock	7.5/10
Rolling Stone Australia	4.5/5 stars
Sputnikmusic	4.5/5
Sydney Morning Herald	5/5 stars

I See Seaweed was received enthusiastically by the Australian press. FasterLouder wrote: "I See Seaweed often feels less like a rock album and more like a demented film score". Andrew McMillen wrote that it "captures a singular band in scintillating form, delivering yet another astounding collection of songs." Writing for Lot's Wife, Nick Reid praised the album's lyricism & called it "a force to be reckoned with." "While polemicists of the left and right continue to fire the occasional shot in the simmering Australian history wars," notes Patrick Emery writing for Sydney Morning Herald, "The Drones' sociological narrative" on I See Seaweed "remains devoid of ideological pretence, and rich in its portrayal of the inherent flaws of humanity."

The album has also received highly positive reviews from several international sources upon its release. Sputnikmusic wrote that the album "showcases The Drones at their creative peak. All eight tracks are meticulously structured, providing an excellent backdrop for Liddiard's dazzling poetry." The Quietus wrote that the band "never sounded quite this good". Jorge Salas, writing for Spanish magazine Muzikalia, praised the album as The Drone's best in years, and called "Why Write a Letter You'll Never Send" the band's "most beautiful composition" to date. Italian website OndaRock noted the band's consistency with the release of the album, and praised its more textured & dynamic music. In a year-end round-up, Darren Levin of The Guardian wrote that the band, alongside "Aussie rock stalwarts" such as Adalita and Nick Cave and the Bad Seeds, "put out great records in 2013. (Of course they did.)" He went on to write: "The Drones, in particular, consistently find new ways of being the Drones. Frontman Gareth Liddiard’s newfound fondness for Russian classical composers took the drama on I See Seaweed to another level, as did the addition of pianist Steve Hesketh to their lineup." US music critic Anthony Fantano reviewed the album positively, saying that it contained "some of [The Drones'] longest and most emotive songs yet."

=== Awards ===
In 2013, the album was nominated for a J Award which is determined by national alternative radio station Triple J. I See Seaweed was also nominated at the 2013 ARIA awards for Rock Album of the Year.

=== Accolades ===
The album received acclaim from a variety of sources both within and outside its native country. Over 100 writers from The Music website ranked the album first in their lists of the "20 Best Australian Albums of 2013".

Publication	Country	Accolade	Rank
BuzzFeed	US	The Very Best Australian Albums of 2013	-
Drowned in Sound	UK	Lost Albums 2000–2015	-
FasterLouder	Australia	Top 50 Albums of 2013	6
Flavorwire	US	Flavorwire’s 25 Favorite Albums of 2013	1
The Guardian	UK	The 10 best Australian albums of 2013	3
The Music	Australia	20 Best Australian Albums of 2013	1
Muzikalia	Spain	Best International Albums of 2013	24
The Needle Drop	US	Top 50 Albums of 2013	42
Sputnikmusic	US	Top 50 Albums of 2013	25
The Sydney Morning Herald	Australia	Best music of the year: Daft Punk, Lorde and the class of 2013	2
SYN Media	Australia	Year in Review: Top 10+2 Albums of 2013	7

== Legacy ==
The year following its release, Tiny Mix Tapes called Liddiard "the greatest lyricist currently working in the idiom of guitar music (uncontestable)", calling the album "vitally relevant" and "one of the best rock albums of this nascent decade". Stereo Embers magazine included it on their list of the 100 best albums to have been released between 2010 and 2014. In 2016, Andrew Harrison of Drowned in Sound called it "a dark horse for one of the best albums of the past five years." In 2019, NARC Magazine called the album a "genuine album of the decade contender", whilst Soundblab ranked it 12th on their list of "25 Essential Albums from the Australian Underground". Later that year, Spanish music magazine Hipersónica included the album on their list of the 101 best international albums of the decade, and called it the band's Daydream Nation. In an essay on the album collected in An Anthology of Australian Albums: Critical Engagements (published in 2020), Adam Trainer writes:

I See Seaweed stands as a significant moment in Australian rock music, not only for its refusal to play by the rules of songwriting as dictated by the heavy-handed issues-based Australian songwriting tradition but for the stark, beautiful and often menacing way it frames and comments upon a culturally specific moment. Most remarkably, it achieves this through language that speaks to globally applicable themes. In diffusing its culturally specific moment in order to highlight broader ideas, I See Seaweed posits that Australian music can be political without being parochial.

The song "How to See Through Fog" was used in the telefilm The Outlaw Michael Howe. Ghosting Season called it one of their five favorite albums of the year, with Gavin Miller lamenting the fact that it went "under a lot of peoples' radar[s] [...] as they outstrip about 99% of rock bands at the moment." Kirin J. Callinan covered "A Moat You Can Stand In" live during the APRA Music Awards of 2014. The Russian band La Lettre a Camus covered "Why Write a Letter You'll Never Send" under the title "The Letter I'll Never Send" on their 2014 EP Исчезнувшие IV. Dale Tanner of Ocean Grove listed the title track of the album as a favourite, recalling that it had given him "chills" the first time he'd heard it on the radio.

== Track listing ==
All tracks are written by Gareth Liddiard.

No.	Title	Length
1.	"I See Seaweed"	8:34
2.	"How to See Through Fog"	4:12
3.	"They'll Kill You"	6:06
4.	"A Moat You Can Stand In"	4:23
5.	"Nine Eyes"	7:12
6.	"The Grey Leader"	6:15
7.	"Laika"	6:20
8.	"Why Write a Letter You'll Never Send"	9:17
Total length:		52:21

== Personnel ==
All personnel information is from the album's liner notes.

Band

- Gareth Liddiard – guitar, lead vocals
- Fiona Kitschin – bass guitar, backing vocals
- Mike Noga – drums, backing vocals
- Steve Hesketh – piano, keyboards
- Dan Luscombe – guitar, backing vocals
- Amanda Roff – backing vocals

Production

- Gareth Liddiard & Burke Reid – recording, mixing
- John Roberto – mastering

== Charts ==
Chart (2013)	Peak position
Australian Albums (ARIA)	18
