= Wait Long by the River and the Bodies of Your Enemies Will Float By =

Wait Long By the River and the Bodies of Your Enemies Will Float By

Studio album by The Drones
- Released: 18 April 2005
- Recorded: 2003–2004
- Studio: Atlantis Studios (Port Melbourne, Victoria)
- Genres: Art rock; punk blues; garage rock; noise rock
- Length: 53:37
- Labels: In-Fidelity (Australia); ATP Records (UK/Europe)
- Producers: Locki Lockwood; Gareth Liddiard

The Drones chronology
Here Come the Lies (2002)	Wait Long By the River and the Bodies of Your Enemies Will Float By (2005)	The Miller's Daughter (2005)

Singles from Wait Long by the River and the Bodies of Your Enemies Will Float By
- 1. "Shark Fin Blues"/"You Really Don't Care" Released: 27 March 2006

Wait Long by the River and the Bodies of Your Enemies Will Float By is the second album released by the Drones. Recorded "100% live" (like its predecessor), the album draws influence from the likes of Neil Young and Rowland S. Howard, though it has been described by lead singer/guitarist Gareth Liddiard himself as a punk rock album. The lyrics, penned by Liddiard (except This Time co-written with former band member James McCann) deal with issues such as death, depression and alcoholism in its depiction of Australian working class life.

The album received critical acclaim upon release, regarded later on as the band's "break-out" and one of their most popular releases. The track "Shark Fin Blues", in particular, went on to become a concert staple and was voted by contemporary Australian songwriters as the greatest Australian song of all time in October 2009. The album itself was performed live in its entirety many times, even as a part of the acclaimed Don't Look Back concert series. In 2008, The Age ranked it the best Australian album of the 21st century. Three years later, the band's contemporaries & "industry experts" would vote it the 24th best Australian album of all time. In 2021, Rolling Stone Australia included Wait Long on their list of "The 200 Greatest Australian Albums of All Time".

== Background ==
In 2017, Liddiard revealed to Double J that the album was inspired by many of his experiences in Western Australia prior to forming The Drones: "tales of eye-opening, heartbreaking and deeply troubling events that [...] seeped into the menace and simmering rage that lies not too far beneath the surface of the songs on this album." Reflected in the lyrics to tracks such as "Locust", these include witnessing instances of racism against aboriginals & stories of "ruinous vendettas".

I was up like 2,000 km above Perth and a guy, a farmer, had bulldozed an ochre mine. It was literally the oldest mine on the planet and he'd got angry at some Indigenous mob and just taken a bulldozer and ruined this mine and no one gave a fuck, even though it was the oldest mine in human history. But it was an Aboriginal thing, so why does that matter? Things like that were shocking. It's older than any shit in Rome or Egypt and it's a mine that's been used until white occupation. Those things were very shocking and Western Australia was full of that kind of stuff.

The deaths of his mother & former girlfriend also had a major impact on the album (particularly on "Shark Fin Blues"). Considering the resultant "white hot rage" on their debut album Here Come the Lies to be a dead end, he consciously decided to make Wait Long more melodic & hence accessible to a larger number of listeners.

== Recording ==
Recording of the album occurred during 2003 with Loki Lockwood of Spooky Records producing. Once the sessions were complete the group wanted to change labels, which stalled its release while they saved up enough money to buy out their contract. In 2004 Strybosch left the band and was replaced by Mike Noga (Legends of Motorsport) on drums.

== Content ==
The album has been described as "tight, working-class rock [...] vocal-shredding songs crammed with drunkenness, night sweats, and suicide notes." In relation to their debut, the album has been called "a furthering of that vision and a slight turn into darker territory, with all self-penned material" (the debut was "equally split between covers and originals"). The album "employ[s] highs and lows, and lights and shades, to take [the listener] from introspective moody blues to pumped up rock and roll jams. It centres on the sharp blues-rock guitars and the vocal harmonies of lead singer Gareth Liddiard and his compadres". It has been called "a blistering amalgamation of the down-under psych garage of the Scientists, the sunburned songbook of Nick Cave, and the rough-hewn yelping of Jon Spencer." The music has also been described as having "the boundless cohesion and energy of X or the Gun Club [...] and, of course, the Birthday Party (albeit with less all-over-the-place percussion, horns, and avant tendencies)."

The title of the album comes from an expression of uncertain origin, referenced in works by Jan de Hartog, James Clavell and Umberto Eco, possibly a mistranslation of Confucius, frequently misattributed to Sun Tzu: "If you wait by the river long enough, the bodies of your enemies will float by".

== Promotion and release ==
Triple J put the album tracks, "Shark Fin Blues" and "Baby²", on medium rotation. During an extensive six-month tour encompassing Europe and the United States, All Tomorrow's Parties issued Wait Long by the River and the Bodies of Your Enemies Will Float By outside of Australia, towards the end of 2005. According to a Billboard article published in March 2006, the album had sold 18,000 units since its release.

== Reception ==
=== Critical ===
Professional ratings
Review scores
Source	Rating
AllMusic	4/5 stars
Cokemachineglow	67%
Gigwise	4/5 stars
Mojo	3/5 stars
Mondo Sonoro	8/10
NME	8/10
Ox-Fanzine	8/10
Pitchfork Media	8.3/10
PopMatters	7/10 stars
Uncut	4/5 stars

The album received positive reviews from the international press upon its release through ATP Records in 2005. Brandon Stosuy of Pitchfork Media wrote that the album will "rip out your eardrums, perhaps even your heart". Dimitri Nasrallah of Exclaim! wrote that the band "ooze intensity and broken hearts, and dealing with both after you've had a few too many drinks and the bars have all closed on you", calling them "a band you need to break up to." Thom Jurek of AllMusic wrote that "humor and pathos, nihilism and the hope for redemption fight to the death inside Liddiard's voice as his mates [...] carry him back and forth from the sheer pit of darkness up to an Earth that's been scorched, so he can laugh and wail with grief in fits and starts." Derek Cooper of Plan B wrote that the "red raw howling angst" of tracks like "Shark Fin Blues" and "You Really Don't Care" reaches "heights last scaled on Dylan's bitter 'Rolling Thunder Revue' tour back in 75." Chris Dahlen, writing for SF Weekly, called it "one of the most excruciatingly great rock records of '05."

A more mixed review came from Dan Raper of PopMatters who found fault with the lack of "real redemption for the protagonists of these songs: They despair, they drink, and they drown", despite conceding that this is "more a comment on me than on the band" and that the band are "experts at capturing this dark-grey, aqueous world in sprawling, dense garage-blues epics". A similar point was made by Mark Abraham of Cokemachineglow, who questioned the "cathartic" elements of the lyrics and the inconsistency of most of the songs. He also criticised the band's decision to open with "Shark Fin Blues" as it "reverse[d] the inertia of [the following] songs" and hence "frontloaded" the album.

=== Awards and nominations ===
The album was also nominated for Australian Album of the Year at Triple J's inaugural J Award prize in 2005 (but lost out to Wolfmother) and won the inaugural Australian Music Prize, defeating eight other finalists to win the album of the year. Upon winning the latter, Liddiard told Billboard:

We’ve done over 100 shows in the last four months and we have some nasty debts. We have another world tour starting in May. That’s after we do two tours of Australia. We can’t get jobs because we tour so much. Food is a luxury item right now. We burn through money so it’s safe to say that the 25G’s will not go to waste.

=== Legacy ===
[Wait Long] doesn't pull punches [...] It's not trying to be anybody else, it certainly harks back to music that came before it – there's a bit of Rowland S. Howard or Neil Young in there – but it doesn't just slavishly rip them off. It goes further and it goes hard. It's a good punk rock album, that's what I would say.

— Gareth Liddiard, 2017

A year after its release, Thom Jurek of Allmusic noted that the album had "set the American underground on fire" & "pushed critics to the brink of superlatives in order to describe" its songs. In 2009, Stereogum wrote that the album "finds [the band] at their brainy, raw, eardrum-battering and-heart tugging best". Revisiting the album 10 years after its original release, Matt Hall of Howl and Echoes wrote: "they don’t make albums like this anymore." God Is in the TV called it "the band’s classic". The West Australian wrote that the album "only gets better with age. Perhaps it helps having the eternally excellent Shark Fin Blues as its opening track. But above all Wait Long ... is the purest distillation yet of the Drones' uniquely Australian voice." In 2018, Greil Marcus wrote that the band's performances on this album and its follow up were "as fierce [...] as I’ve ever seen", despite seeming "austere" in comparison to Liddiard's later work with Tropical Fuck Storm.

In September 2009, the album was performed live in its entirety as part of the All Tomorrow's Parties-curated Don't Look Back series, while a vast majority of it was performed live in a widely acclaimed 10th anniversary tour in 2015. "Shark Fin Blues" was voted by contemporary songwriters as the greatest Australian song in October 2009. The song would go on to be used in television shows such as Rectify and Altered Carbon. Britt Daniel of Spoon-fame included the album among his 10 favorite records of the decade, while Ella Hooper named it one of her 10 favourite Australian albums of all time. In 2008, The Age ranked it the 18th best Australian album of all time, making it the highest ranked 21st century release on the list. In a 2011 poll organized by Triple J in which "some of the country's top musicians and industry experts [were asked of] their favourite Australian albums of all time", Wait Long was voted #24 out of 100 entries. In 2021, Rolling Stone Australia included Wait Long at #65 on their list of "The 200 Greatest Australian Albums of All Time" (one of two Drones albums on the list), with Tyler Jenke hailing it as the band's magnum opus.

== Track listing ==
1. "Shark Fin Blues" – (Gareth Liddiard, Rui Pereira) 5:43
2. "Baby²" – (Liddiard, Pereira, Fiona Kitschin, Christian Strybosch) 3:34
3. "The Best You Can Believe In" – (Liddiard) 7:35
4. "Locust" – (Liddiard, Pereira, Kitschin, Strybosch) 6:40
5. "You Really Don't Care" – (Liddiard) 4:40
6. "Sitting on the Edge of the Bed Cryin'" – (Liddiard, Pereira, Kitschin, Strybosch) 7:38
7. "The Freedom in the Loot" – (Liddiard) 6:16
8. "Another Rousing Chorus You Idiots!!!!" – (Liddiard) 5:57
9. "This Time" – (Liddiard, James McCann) 5:34

== Personnel ==
The Drones

- Gareth Liddiard – guitar, lead vocals, synth, Hammond organ, producer
- Rui Pereira – guitar, backing vocals, violin
- Fiona Kitschin – bass, backing vocals, piano
- Christian Strybosch – drums, backing vocals

Additional musician

- Steve Hesketh – Hammond organ, Wurlitzer electric piano

Production

- Loki Lockwood – producer
- Jack the Bear (Tony Mantz) – mastering
- Daniel Campbell – cover photo
