= Gala Mill =

Studio album by the Drones
- Released: 2 September 2006 (Australia); 8 October 2006 (UK)
- Recorded: March 13–19, 2005
- Venue: Gala Farm (Cranbrook, Tasmania)
- Genres: Garage rock; folk rock; punk blues; post-punk
- Length: 54:51
- Labels: ATP Recordings, Shock Records
- Producers: Aaron Cupples, Gareth Liddiard

The Drones chronology
The Miller's Daughter (2005)	Gala Mill (2006)	Live In Spaceland (2006)

Gala Mill is the third studio album by Australian band the Drones, which was released in September 2006. Recorded in an abandoned mill in Tasmania, it was their last album to feature founding member Rui Pereira and the first to feature Mike Noga on drums. The music, which makes "an epic leap beyond garage rock", adds influences from folk rock and contemporary folk music to their usual punk blues style. Gareth Liddiard's lyrics for the album are centered more on Australia's colonial and recent history, evident in tracks such as "Jezebel", "Words From The Executioner To Alexander Pearce" and "Sixteen Straws".

Much like its predecessor, the album received critical acclaim from sources both within and outside Australia, with much of it centered on the album's raw musical style and Liddiard's dark lyricism. It was also their first album to enter the top 100 of the ARIA Charts & their second to be nominated for the Australian Music Prize. In 2010, Gala Mill was listed as one of the 100 Best Australian Albums of all time, while a year later it would be voted by the band's contemporaries & "industry experts" as the 19th best Australian album of all time. The album would also go on to be included on Rolling Stone Australia's list of "The 200 Greatest Australian Albums of All Time".

== Recording ==
Gala Mill was recorded in a mill on an isolated 10,000-acre (40 km^{2}) farm on Tasmania’s east coast. Barking dogs and birdsong are heard between tracks, and the island’s history is heavily referenced throughout the songs. The place was secured through a friend of drummer (and Tasmanian native) Mike Noga's sister, and was built by convicts in 1842.

The album was recorded by Aaron Cupples, a "good friend" of Liddiard. He recalled that the band wanted "an honest and uninvolved" sound, similar to Neil Young's Tonight's the Night: "I wanted [...] not to 'hide' the process of recording from the listener [...] all the drop-ins and drop-outs are all just laid out bare." He recalled a crossfade 2 minutes into the track "I'm Here Now" for the drop-in of a new guitar part, which you'd normally make a fraction of a second to hide it, but he left it quite long to make it sound "like a volume swell that you can do on a guitar with the volume knob". The band also spent a lot of time "placing the drums in the right spot so they sounded big", which ended up being in the middle of the room and lent the recordings "plenty of low end". The sessions, mixed down to tape, had a similarly "straightforward" mixing process, with no compression being used and plug-in reverb being used sparingly. The mixing, done a year after the sessions were recorded, was completed in "two days flat".

== Content ==
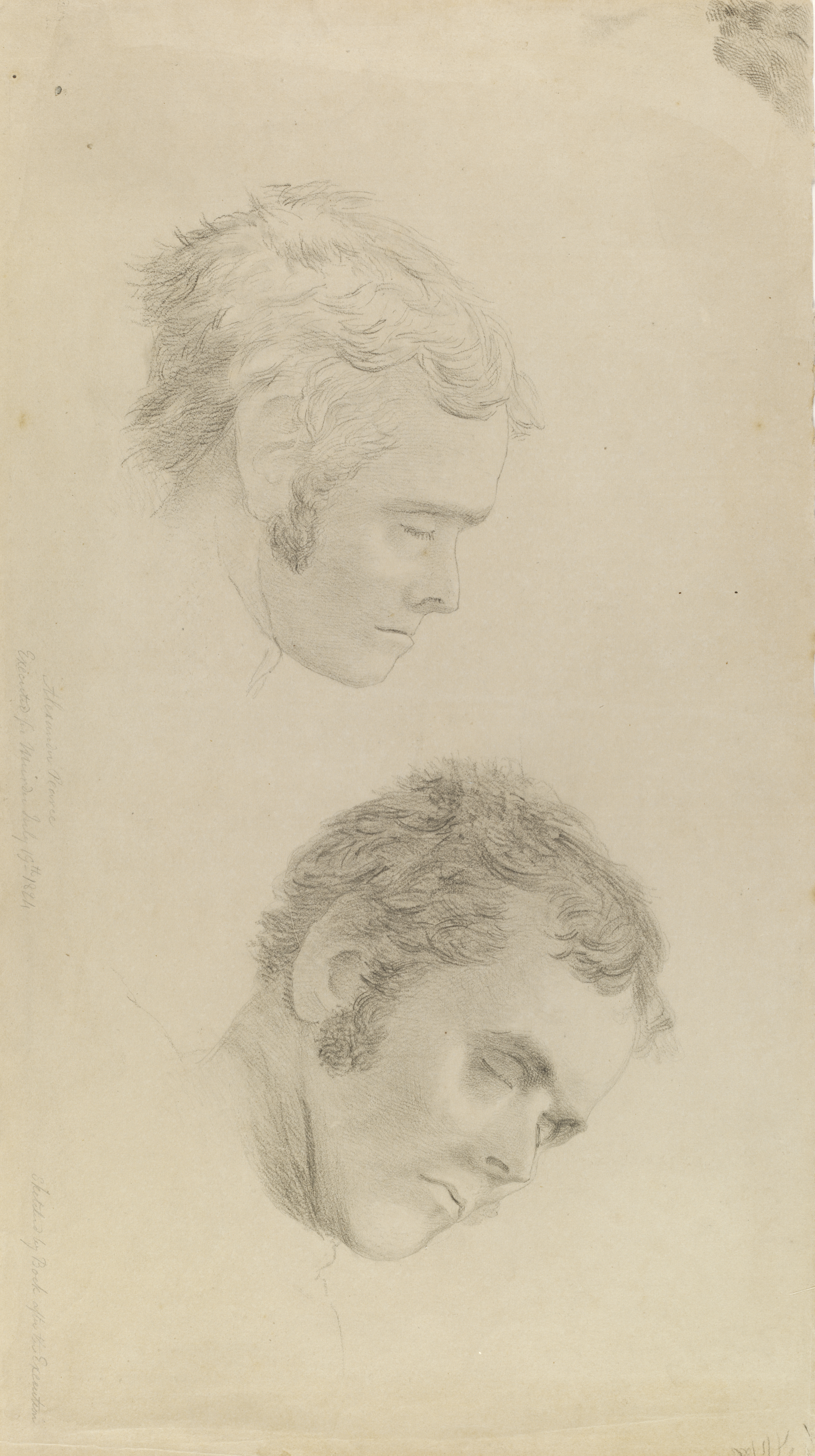
Drawings, by Thomas Bock, of the face of Alexander Pearce after his execution.

"Jezebel", "the slow, roiling eight-minute opener [...] coiled to bust loose at any moment", deals with topics such as "the death of journalist Daniel Pearl in the Middle East, nuclear testing in the Australian homeland, and a massacre that is infamous in Aussie history". The track has been described as a "roller coaster" and as "one part love song to nine parts apocalyptic nightmare" featuring allegorical lyrics. According to Greil Marcus, the "delirious" song "seems to suck all the chaos and horror of the present moment into a single human being, who struggles to contain that world inside himself". He described the choruses as "unnerving" and found the band's performance on the song overall as a "shocker".

The track "Dog-Eared", featuring slide guitar has been described as "Neil Young's "Cortez the Killer" crossed with Nick Cave's Boatman's Call album" in which "the kind of love revealed [...] is so vulnerable that it becomes abusive". The "even slower" following track, "I'm Here Now" deals with "drug addiction -- observing it, not participating in it." Bernard Zuel writes that the track "brings to mind the more intense moments of the Triffids." The song "Words from the Executioner to Alexander Pearce", "the first of two epics that delve into the slaughterhouse that was Australia's early history" references Alexander Pearce – a convict-bushranger who escaped Sarah Island's penal settlement on Tasmania's west coast with seven fellow convicts in 1822. He was executed in July 1824 after a conviction of cannibalism during his escape attempts. In the song, "Liddiard inhabits the executioner's mind for a discussion of guilt, empathy, experience, forgiveness, and jealousy." "I Don't Ever Want To Change", the "fastest and jauntiest number" on the album featuring "mutant Chuck Berry leads and open-chorded riffs", features lyrics that "tells [the story] of a depressed shopkeeper who burns his business down for the insurance money" in "trying to commune with nature." "Work For Me" is the first ever Drones track to feature Fiona Kitschin on lead vocals. "I Looked Down the Line and I Wondered" takes its title from a song by Sister Rosetta Tharpe. "Are You Leaving For The Country" is a cover of a song by Richard Tucker, made popular by his wife Karen Dalton.

The album closes with "Sixteen Straws", which is the band's second lengthiest studio recording till date (after "The City"). The first verse is lifted from the traditional song, "Moreton Bay". According to the liner notes: "To avoid damnation by suicide, groups of catholic convicts would draw straws, the long and the short decided the deceased and his killer." The song "carefully paints a scene in colonial Australia, backed by just the faint sound of guitars, a harmonica, and [Gareth's] own spittle". It has been called "The Drones’ masterstroke [...] the standout track of Gala Mill [...] the story of men forced to kill each other to save themselves" with its story being compared to The Proposition.

== Release ==
The album was released in Australia on CD through Shock Records. ATP Recordings released the album on double LP and digipak in the UK and the US (the former was solely released in the UK). It was issued in the UK on 8 October 2006. A music video (the band's first) was made for the track "Jezebel" and released on YouTube. It was described by The Aquarian Weekly as "apocalyptic [...] rustling up mostly old black and white film marked by torture, punishment, and wartime oppression."

== Reception ==
Professional ratings
Aggregate scores
Source	Rating
Metacritic	87/100
Review scores
Source	Rating
AllMusic	4/5 stars
Contact Music	4.5/5 stars
Drowned in Sound	8/10
Gigwise	9/10 stars
Mojo	4/5 stars
Ox-Fanzine	10/10
Pitchfork	8.4/10
The Skinny	3/5 stars
Spin	4/5 stars
Tiny Mix Tapes	5/5 stars

=== National ===
Gala Mill received positive reviews from the Australian press. Jeff Glorfeld of The Age wrote that "[The band] made another [album], even better, dense, tense [...] and yet - frenzied?" and praised Liddiard's lyrics. Bernard Zuel of Sydney Morning Herald wrote that Liddiard's "grasp of a dark vision is utterly compelling, fierce and poetic, unseen in these parts since the days when Nick Cave merged Flannery O'Connor and the Old Testament while the early Bad Seeds let loose the hounds of hell", though the "understated grandeur" of their music set them apart from other similarly influenced bands.

=== International ===
The album received a Metacritic score of 87, indicating "universal acclaim" based on 6 reviews. Seth K of Tiny Mix Tapes wrote that "humility rules [on this album], and what makes Gala Mill so impressive is how The Drones wear their emotions on their sleeves and how naturally everything spills out", calling Liddiard "passionately belligerent" and comparing him to "storyteller(s)" of the likes of Nick Cave and Bob Dylan. He described the band as "radicals, patriots, and lovers, all rolled into one." Brandon Stosuy of Pitchfork wrote that Gala Mill finds the "band mak(ing) an epic leap beyond garage rock, giving Gareth Liddiard space to spin his dark, literate, history-rich yarns." He ended his review by writing: "New Jersey has Springsteen, Minneapolis, Craig Finn, and Liddiard's painterly sense of place and nation is equally stirring. You get the sense he could kick both the Boss and Finn's asses, actually." Tom Gilhespy of Gigwise called it "a murderous wonder" and "the most self-consciously Australian album in years [...] also one of the most important". Mike Rea of Contact Music called it "excellent stuff. [...] A swaggering Stones-y rock feel combined with raw and loose blues mess and moments of remarkable beauty, The Drones are capable of making great music whose rough edges aren't just left in, they are actively embraced and put front and centre." He also compared the band favorably to Beasts of Bourbon, concluding: "there is a great sense of meditative, brooding, elemental rock. Gala Mill is an excellent calling card for what may be Oz's best band."

A mixed review came from Ali Maloney of The Skinny, who suggested that the album was cashing in on the then recent success of The Proposition through its sound and lyrics, sarcastically describing it as "[g]ood haunting dust bowl rock for those days spent sitting on a log swigging whiskey and drinking beans out of the can." Writing for Brainwashed, John Kealy called it "a solid release with some very strong songs that the band should be proud of but I’m afraid I’m still waiting for The Drones to produce their masterpiece." He criticized some of the songs as being "a little overstretched" and also compared the album unfavorably to the band's live performances: "With Gala Mill The Drones still haven’t captured the rawness and the power of their live show. It is frustrating listening to their studio output after having experienced them first in the flesh. The fly-on-the-wall interludes of the band talking in the studio (which become terribly annoying) suggest to the uninitiated that this is what The Drones sound like when they just belt out a song but it isn’t. Speakers should be melting when the CD is playing but alas they just get mildly hot." Exclaim!'s Dimitri Nasrallah called it "[a] worthy 2006 follow-up to a great 2005 album, but those new to the band are advised to start off at Wait Long."

=== Awards ===
The album was nominated for the 2006 Australian Music Prize - the second year in a row that the band had been nominated, with Wait Long By The River and the Bodies of Your Enemies Will Float By winning the previous year - but lost out to Augie March's Moo, You Bloody Choir. They were also nominated for Most Outstanding New Independent Artist at the inaugural AIR (Australian Independent Record Labels Association) Chart Awards.

== Legacy ==
=== Accolades ===
"Gala Mill is pretty fucking depressing, [...] It's not like going on a summer holiday."

— Gareth Liddiard

In October 2010 Gala Mill was listed at #21 in the book, 100 Best Australian Albums. In a poll organized by Triple J in 2011 where "some of the country's top musicians and industry experts [were asked of] their favourite Australian albums of all time", Gala Mill was voted #19 out of 100 entries. In 2014, the track "Sixteen Straws" was included by Flavorwire on their list of "The 50 Best Album Closing Tracks in History". In 2021, Rolling Stone Australia included Gala Mill at #155 on their list of "The 200 Greatest Australian Albums of All Time" (one of two Drones albums on the list), with James DiFabrizio writing that it saw the band "[expand] their vision to the feverish, eloquent rock’n’roll dirges that would go on to define their legacy in Australian music."

=== Academia ===
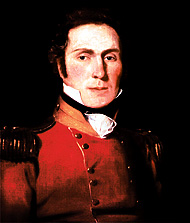
Commandant Logan is featured in the lyrics to "Sixteen Straws".

Two songs from the album - "Words from the Executioner to Alexander Pearce" and "Sixteen Straws" (alongside "The Radicalisation of D" from Liddiard's solo album Strange Tourist) - were chosen as the subject of a research paper by Joseph Cummins titled An Archipelago of Convicts and Outsiders: The Songs of The Drones and Gareth Liddiard. Published in Southerly in 2012, the paper argues that these songs "perform a remapping of the space of the Australian colonial convict myth [...] forming a cartography that expands the scope of the myth beyond the confines of the Australian continent, locating it within a global carceral archipelago. The rich vein of historical and mythical material in the songs enables an examination of the connections between the past of Australian colonial history and the present of global imperialism." In this context, he finds the executioner from "Words from the Executioner to Alexander Pearce" "giv[ing] particular attention to what he sees as the hypocrisy of the chaplain, here figured as a metonym of colonial society." He also finds his final words "mark[ing] a complex spatial figuration[:] according to the executioner, Pearce is at home in exile. Additionally, the first line of the final paragraph, “we were meant to meet”, indicates that Pearce is also fated to encounter the executioner, and therefore Pearce is, in a sense, at home on the scaffold, the machinery of death." "Sixteen Straws" "takes up the spatial concerns of “Words” and, moving them to Moreton Bay, focuses on another facet of the abject otherness of convict experience. [...] Through five verses the song tells of the cruelty and brutality of the colonial penal system, the grim desperation of convicts attempting to escape lives of misery, and of frontier violence involving the surprise attack by local Aboriginal people on the infamous Commandant Logan. This reversal of the normal order of things equates life to the insignificant “straws” of the title of the song, exemplifying the way that space has been transformed by carceral and colonial systems of power." "In reinventing and extending “Moreton Bay” as “Sixteen Straws”" he writes, "The Drones have re-inscribed a nineteenth-century landscape of exile, opening an abject space of otherness within the convict story."

== Track listing ==
All tracks are written by The Drones unless mentioned otherwise

Gala Mill CD release (ATPRCD22A)
No.	Title	Writer(s)	Length
1.	"Jezebel"		7:51
2.	"Dog Eared"		4:53
3.	"I'm Here Now"		7:45
4.	"Words From The Executioner To Alexander Pearce"		5:15
5.	"I Don't Ever Want To Change"		3:59
6.	"Work For Me"		5:38
7.	"I Looked Down The Line And I Wondered"		5:29
8.	"Are You Leaving For The Country"	Richard Tucker	4:26
9.	"Sixteen Straws"	The Drones, traditional	9:35
Total length:			54:51

=== Gala Mill UK release ===
All tracks written by The Drones unless mentioned otherwise:

Side one
No.	Title	Length
1.	"Jezebel"	7:51
2.	"Dog Eared"	4:53
Total length:		12:44

Side two
No.	Title	Length
3.	"I'm Here Now"	7:45
4.	"Words From The Executioner To Alexander Pearce"	5:15
Total length:		13:00

Side three
No.	Title	Length
1.	"I Don't Ever Want To Change"	3:59
2.	"Work For Me"	5:38
3.	"I Looked Down The Line And I Wondered"	5:29
Total length:		14:56

Side four
No.	Title	Writer(s)	Length
1.	"Are You Leaving For The Country"	Richard Tucker	4:26
2.	"Sixteen Straws"	The Drones, traditional	9:35
Total length:			14:01

== Personnel ==
Adapted from liner notes:

The Drones

- Gareth Liddiard – lead vocals, guitar, melodeon, recording, string arrangements, recording engineer, mixing
- Rui Pereira – guitar, vocals
- Fiona Kitschin – bass, xylophone, vocals, lead vocals (track 6), percussion
- Mike Noga – drums, harmonica, vocals

Additional musicians

- Dan Luscombe – slide guitars
- Aaron Cupples – bass (track 8)
- Michelle Lewit – violins

Production

- Aaron Cupples – recording engineer, mixing, panoramic photo
- John Ruberto – mastering
- Dan Campbell – photography
- Spencer P. Jones – cover image
- The Downie Breitkreuz Group – art direction and design

== Charts ==
Chart (2006)	Peak position
ARIA Albums Chart	66
