= The Drones (Australian band) =

Australian band

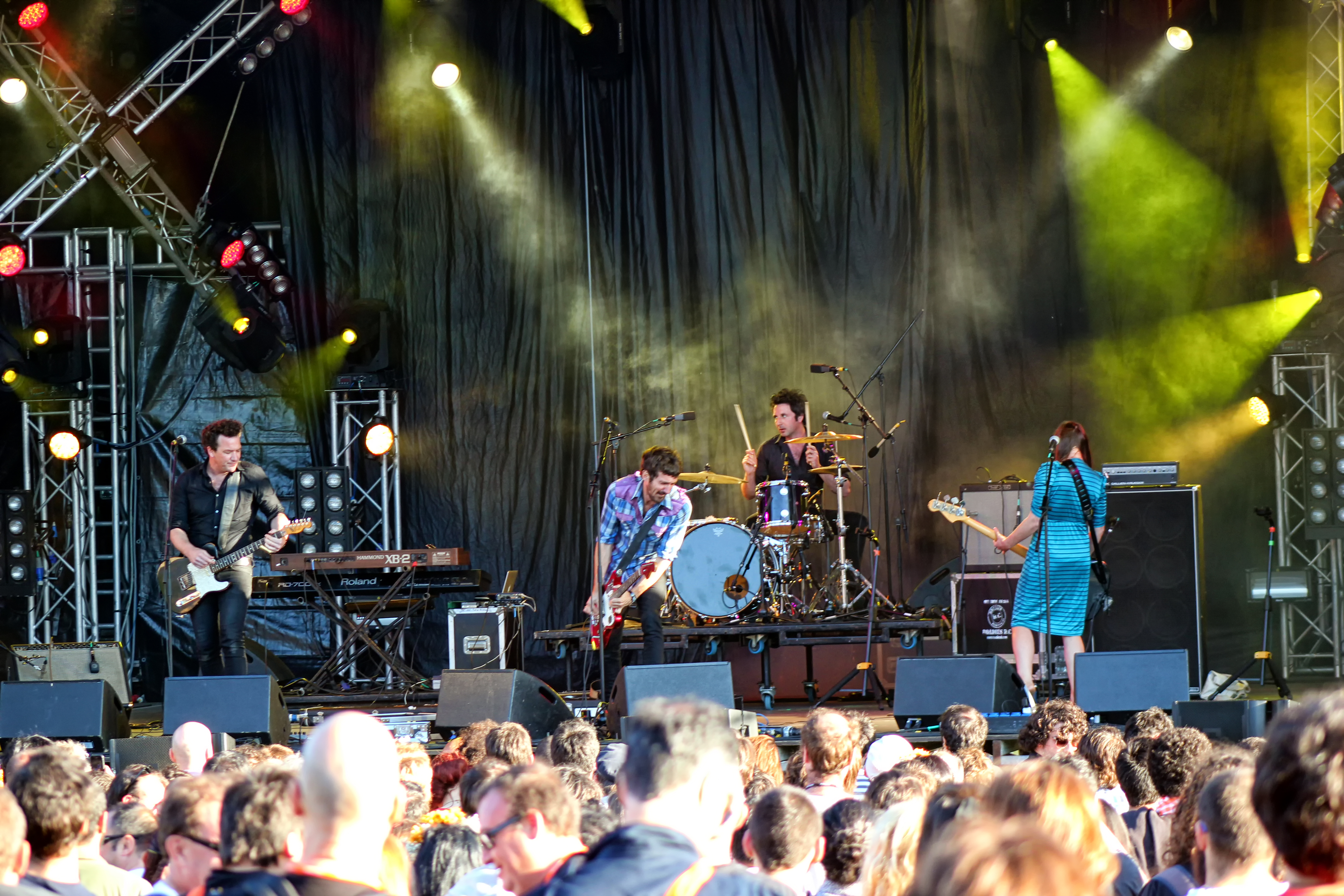
- The Drones live in Porto, June 2013

Background information
- Origin: Perth, Western Australia, Australia
- Genres: Alternative rock; blues rock; experimental rock; garage rock; noise rock; garage punk; punk blues
- Years active: 1997–2016, 2025, 2026
- Labels: Spooky; In-Fidelity/Shock; ATP/Shock; Bang!; Tropical Fuck Storm
- Spinoffs: Tropical Fuck Storm, Springtime, Spencer P. Jones and the Nothing Butts
- Spinoff of: Bong Odyssey
- Members: Gareth Liddiard; Christian Strybosch; Fiona Kitschin; Dan Luscombe; Steve Hesketh
- Past members: Warren Hall; James McCann; Rui Pereira; Brendon Humphries; Mike Noga
- Website: tropicalfuckstormrecords.com

The Drones are an Australian rock band, formed in Perth by mainstay lead vocalist and guitarist Gareth Liddiard in 1997. Fiona Kitschin, his domestic partner, joined on bass guitar and vocals in 2002. Other long-term members include Rui Pereira on bass guitar and then guitar, Mike Noga on drums, vocals, harmonica and percussion, and Dan Luscombe on guitar, vocals and keyboards. Their second album, Wait Long by the River and the Bodies of Your Enemies Will Float By (April 2005), won the inaugural Australian Music Prize. In October 2010 their third studio album, Gala Mill (September 2006) was listed at No. 21 in the book, 100 Best Australian Albums. Two of their albums have reached the top 20 on the ARIA Albums Chart, I See Seaweed (March 2013) and Feelin Kinda Free (March 2016). The group went on hiatus in December 2016 with Kitschin and Liddiard forming a new group, Tropical Fuck Storm, in the following year.

== History ==
=== Formation and early years (1997–2004) ===
The Drones were formed in Perth, Western Australia in 1997 by Warren Hall on drums, Gareth Liddiard on lead vocals and guitar, James McCann on guitar and Rui Pereira on bass guitar. The group were an outlet for Liddiard's songs and the unorthodox music he and Pereira had made after meeting in high school, in 1988. All four were also members of the Gutterville Splendour Six, which was led by singer Maurice Flavel, and included Brendon Humphries on guitar. The Drones played a handful of shows in Perth and recorded an unreleased EP before Liddiard and Pereira left for the eastern states in January 2000.

The pair relocated to Melbourne where they were joined by former bandmate Humphries, who took over on bass guitar after Pereira moved to lead guitar. Hall soon returned to Perth and was replaced by Christian Strybosch (ex-Stunt Car Drivers) on drums. In 2002 Humphries moved back to Perth and was replaced on bass guitar by Fiona Kitschin (who had previously played with Liddiard and Pereira). The new line up of Liddiard, Kitschin, Pereira and Strybosch were recorded on the Drones' debut studio album, Here Come the Lies (August 2002), via Spooky Records. Humphries formed the Kill Devil Hills in 2003 as an acoustic country blues group.

=== Wait Long by the River... and Gala Mill (2004–2008) ===
Recording of the Drones' second album, Wait Long by the River and the Bodies of Your Enemies Will Float By, occurred during 2003 with Loki Lockwood of Spooky Records producing. Once the sessions were complete the group wanted to change labels, which stalled its release while they saved up enough money to buy out their contract. In 2004 Strybosch left the band and was replaced by Mike Noga (Legends of Motorsport) on drums. Bruce Milne's In-Fidelity Recordings eventually issued the album in April 2005, to enthusiastic reviews from the underground music press.

"Shark Fin Blues", was released as its lead single, which Denham Sadler of The Guardian described, "delves into the darkest corners of the human psyche, where depression, loss and anger lie. It's a bitter song that typifies Liddiard's unique approach to music and songwriting and has become an anthem of sorts for the disenfranchised and melancholic." The album was nominated for Triple J's inaugural 2005 J Award prize in 2005, which was won by Wolfmother.

In March 2005 they went to a farm at Cranbrook, near Swansea, Tasmania, to record their third album, Gala Mill (September 2006). During a six-month tour of Europe and the United States, All Tomorrow's Parties (ATP) issued their second album outside of Australia, in October 2005, via ATP Recordings. The band spent the interim touring Australia and the northern hemisphere. Also in 2006 a compilation album, The Miller's Daughter, comprising out-takes from their first two albums was released by Bang! Records (a Spanish label, which has other underground Australian bands on its roster).

In April 2006 Wait Long by the River and the Bodies of Your Enemies Will Float By won the inaugural Australian Music Prize (AMP) for the Drones. Also in contention were works by Wolfmother, the Go-Betweens, TZU, the Devastations, the Mess Hall, Tex, Don & Charlie and Ben Lee. Liddiard explained how they could spend the $25,000 prize money, "We played in Sydney last week and both of our guitars totally died. The guts fell out of mine and Rui's neck snapped off. We've done over 100 shows in the last four months and we have some nasty debts. We have another world tour starting in May. That's after we do two tours of Australia. We can't get jobs because we tour so much. Food is a luxury item right now." The Drones continued to tour throughout the year, including a support slot on You Am I's Australian tour in July.

Gala Mill became their first album to reach the ARIA Albums Chart top 100, in September 2006. It was also nominated for the Australian Music Prize for that year. The Drones were nominated as Most Outstanding New Independent Artist at the inaugural AIR Awards of 2006. Late in the year Pereira left and was replaced by Dan Luscombe (The Blackeyed Susans, Dan Kelly and the Alpha Males, Stardust Five), on lead guitar and vocals (later also on keyboards). Luscombe debuted for the group at the Meredith Music Festival in December of that year. On 15 November 2006 the group recorded their performance at Spaceland, a nightclub in Silver Lake, Los Angeles, California, which was issued as, Live in Spaceland (February 2007), through the US label, Spaceland Recordings.

In 2007 the Drones toured with the Big Day Out before undertaking a four-month tour of Europe (with shows in Norway, France and Italy), commencing in April with a performance at the All Tomorrow's Parties Festival in the UK, curated by Dirty Three. The band's European tour was followed by a national tour of Australia, with Snowman. 2007 also saw the release of the band's first video album, Live in Madrid, a live performance by the band at the Gruta 77 club in Madrid. They followed with a period of touring until 2008.

=== Havilah (2008–2012) ===
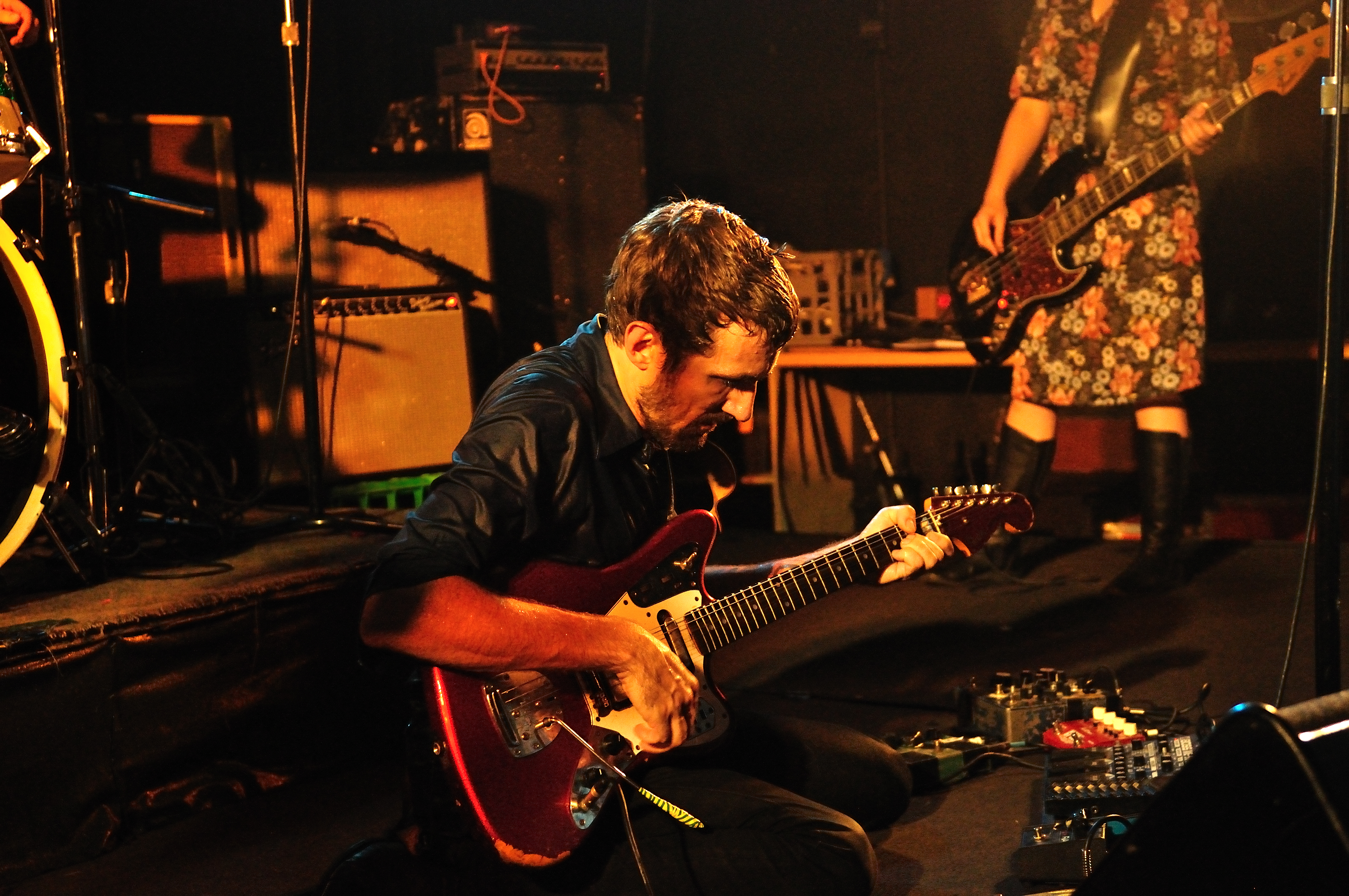
On stage in Melbourne, 2009

In July 2008 the Drones released a digital/12" six-track compilation EP, The Minotaur (July 2008), with two new tracks, "The Minotaur" and "Nail It Down". These appeared on their next studio album, Havilah (20 September 2008), which peaked at No. 47 on the ARIA Albums Chart. It was recorded in a valley in Victoria's Alpine Shire of the same name. The band undertook a national tour in November, performed at the Falls Festival in December and toured Australia in February 2009 as part of the St Jerome's Laneway Festival. Havilah had worldwide release in that month.

More European and American dates occurred in 2009 including an appearance at the All Tomorrow's Parties New York Festival in September. Wait Long by the River... was performed in its entirety during the ATP-curated Don't Look Back series. In a poll of contemporary Australian songwriters in October of that year, organised by Triple J, "Shark Fin Blues", was listed at No. 1 of the 25 Greatest Australian Songs. At AIR Awards of 2009, the Drones won two awards, Best Independent Album of the Year for Havilah and Independent Artist of the Year.

At the inaugural Australian Rolling Stone Awards, held in Sydney in January 2010, the group won the Best Live Act award. In October 2010 Gala Mill was listed at No. 21 in the book, 100 Best Australian Albums, by music journalists, John O'Donnell, Toby Creswell and Craig Mathieson. Liddiard issued an acoustic solo album, Strange Tourist (October 2010), before returning to duties with the Drones.

The band released another video album, A Thousand Mistakes (2011), with live footage from Australia, Germany and France. It included a session recorded in Melbourne using keyboard player Steve Hesketh, who had been recorded with the band on Wait Long by the River... and The Miller's Daughter.

=== I See Seaweed (2013–2015) ===
The Drones, now with Hesketh as a full-time member, released their next studio album, I See Seaweed in March 2013. It peaked at No. 18 on the ARIA Albums Chart. Two singles appeared from the album, "How to See Through Fog" and the title track, which also had a music video. In mid-August 2013 the Drones were finalists for the AMP for I See Seaweed, alongside efforts by Kevin Mitchell and Nick Cave and the Bad Seeds. The band were nominated for three Music Victoria Awards of 2013 best band, best album and best live act.

The album was identified as the sixth-best album of 2013 by FasterLouder. The article referenced the online publication's March 2013 review of the album, in which it stated: "I See Seaweed often feels less like a rock album and more like a demented film score". Over 100 writers from the Music.com.au website ranked the album first in its list of the 20 Best Australian Albums of 2013. Following the end of their tour in support of I See Seaweed in 2014, Noga departed to focus on his solo work and was replaced by a returning Strybosch.

=== Feelin Kinda Free and split (2015–2016) ===
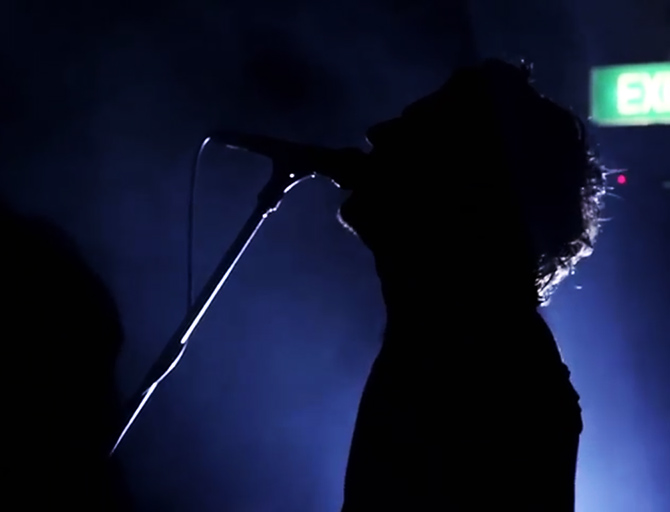
The Drones performing in 2016

The Drones released their first single from Feelin Kinda Free, "Taman Shud," in October 2015. The accompanying music video was satirically aimed at right-wing pundits such as Andrew Bolt and the Reclaim Australia movement. It was followed by a second single, "To Think That I Once Loved You," in January 2016. Feelin Kinda Free, was released on 18 March 2016, which became their highest charting work by reaching No. 12 on the ARIA Albums Chart.

It was the first album by the band to be released through their own label, Tropical Fuck Storm (TFS) Records. It was met with widely-positive reviews from outlets such as Drowned in Sound, The Guardian and Music Feeds. The band played their final show in support of the album in December 2016 as part of the Fairgrounds Festival in Berry, New South Wales; and entered a hiatus period following the set.

=== Hiatus and reunions (2017–present) ===
In 2017 Kitschin and Liddiard were founding members of a new band, Tropical Fuck Storm, alongside High Tension drummer Lauren Hammel and Harmony vocalist Erica Dunn. The band toured through the US with Band of Horses in 2017. Their debut album, A Laughing Death in Meatspace, appeared in March 2018 via TFS Records, and peaked at No. 25.

In a Reddit AMA done shortly before the release of TFS' second album in late 2019, when asked about the reasons behind the band going on hiatus and its future, Liddiard revealed that the other Drones members were "busy doin[g] their own stuff, kids jobs etc.... it slows stuff down. [P]lus it[']s 20 years old so doin[g] something new is fun. [W]e haven[']t broken up. [E]ven if we did, no one really breaks up anymore."

From February to May 2020, the band released a series of five archival live recordings through Bandcamp. The first one compiles performances recorded between 2001 and 2004, ending with an interview with future member Luscombe. The second release compiled a live show recorded at Melbourne's Spanish Club on 4 March 2006 (shortly before the release of Gala Mill). The third compiled recordings from between 2004 and 2008, which includes covers of "Manic Depression" by The Jimi Hendrix Experience and "Words From A Woman To Her Man" by Beasts of Bourbon (recorded for PBS 106.7FM and 3RRR, respectively). The fourth compiled live recordings from between 2009 and 2012, including a series of promotional idents they'd recorded for radio stations in the UK. The fifth and final release in the series was a 2016 live show recorded at The Tote Hotel in Melbourne that was previously uploaded to YouTube through the band's official channel.

Former drummer Mike Noga's death was announced on 27 August 2020; he was 42.

In February 2025, the band announced they would reunite for two shows only in May at the Croxton Bandroom in Melbourne as part of a benefit concert for an undisclosed friend. The Feelin Kinda Free line-up played the shows, alongside sets from Paul and Dan Kelly, Don Walker, The Nation Blue and Mod Con. In April 2026, the band announced a one-off reunion tour of Australia to take place across August and September of that year.

== Members ==
=== Current members ===
- Gareth Liddiard – lead vocals, lead guitar (1997–2016, 2025, 2026), keyboards (2015–2016)
- Christian Strybosch – drums (2000–2004, 2014–2016, 2025, 2026)
- Fiona Kitschin – bass guitar, backing and occasional lead vocals (2002–2016, 2025, 2026)
- Dan Luscombe – rhythm guitar, backing vocals (2007–2016, 2025, 2026), keyboards (2015–2016)
- Steve Hesketh – keyboards, piano (2013–2016, 2025, 2026)

=== Former members ===
- Warren Hall – drums (1997–2000)
- James McCann – rhythm guitar (1997–2000)
- Rui Pereira – bass guitar (1997–2000), rhythm guitar (2000–2007)
- Brendon Humphries – bass guitar (2000–2002)
- Mike Noga – drums, backing vocals, harmonica, percussion (2004–2014; died 2020)

== Discography ==
=== Studio albums ===
- Here Come the Lies (2002)
- Wait Long by the River and the Bodies of Your Enemies Will Float By (2005)
- Gala Mill (2006)
- Havilah (2008)
- I See Seaweed (2013)
- Feelin Kinda Free (2016)

== Awards ==
=== AIR Awards ===
The Australian Independent Record Awards (commonly known informally as AIR Awards) is an annual awards night to recognise, promote and celebrate the success of Australia's Independent Music sector.

| Year | Nominee / work | Award | Result |
|---|---|---|---|
| 2006 | The Drones | Most Outstanding New Independent Artist | Nominated |
| 2009 | The Drones | Best Independent Artist | Won |
| 2009 | Havilah | Best Independent Album | Won |
| 2013 | themselves | Best Independent Artist | Nominated |
| 2013 | I See Seaweed | Best Independent Album | Nominated |

=== APRA Awards ===
The APRA Awards are presented annually from 1982 by the Australasian Performing Right Association (APRA).

| Year | Nominee / work | Award | Result |
|---|---|---|---|
| 2014 | "A Moat You Can Stand In" | Song of the Year | Nominated |
| 2017 | "To Think That I Once Loved You" | Song of the Year | Shortlisted |

=== ARIA Music Awards ===
The ARIA Music Awards is an annual awards ceremony that recognises excellence, innovation, and achievement across all genres of Australian music.

| Year | Nominee / work | Award | Result |
|---|---|---|---|
| 2009 | Havilah | Best Rock Album | Nominated |
| 2009 | Havilah | Best Group | Nominated |
| 2009 | Havilah | Best Independent Release | Nominated |
| 2013 | I See Seaweed | Best Rock Album | Nominated |
| 2013 | I See Seaweed | Best Independent Release | Nominated |
| 2013 | I See Seaweed Tour | Best Australian Live Act | Nominated |

=== Australian Music Prize ===
| Year | Nominee / work | Award | Result |
|---|---|---|---|
| 2005 | Wait Long by the River and the Bodies of Your Enemies Will Float By | Australian Album of the Year | Won |
| 2006 | Gala Mill | Australian Album of the Year | Nominated |
| 2008 | Havilah | Australian Album of the Year | Nominated |

=== EG Awards / Music Victoria Awards ===
The EG Awards (known as Music Victoria Awards since 2013) are an annual awards night celebrating Victorian music. They commenced in 2006.

| Year | Nominee / work | Award | Result |
|---|---|---|---|
| 2008 | Havilah | Best Album | Nominated |
| 2008 | The Drones | Best Band | Nominated |
| 2013 | I See Seaweed | Best Album | Nominated |
| 2013 | The Drones | Best Band | Won |
| 2013 | The Drones | Best Live Band | Won |
| 2015 | The Drones | Best Live Band | Nominated |
| 2016 | Feelin' Kinda Free | Best Album | Nominated |
| 2016 | "Taman Shud" | Best Song | Won |
| 2016 | The Drones | Best Band | Nominated |
| 2016 | The Drones | Best Live Band | Nominated |
| 2016 | The Drones | Best Regional Act | Won |

=== J Awards ===
The J Awards are an annual series of Australian music awards that were established by the Australian Broadcasting Corporation's youth-focused radio station Triple J. They commenced in 2005.

| Year | Nominee / work | Award | Result |
|---|---|---|---|
| 2005 | Wait Long by the River and the Bodies of Your Enemies Will Float By | Australian Album of the Year | Nominated |
| 2013 | I See Seaweed | Australian Album of the Year | Nominated |
| 2016 | themselves | Double J Artist of the Year | Nominated |
