= Dan Luscombe =

Australian guitarist, producer, and composer

- Born: Daniel Francis Luscombe; Melbourne, Victoria, Australia
- Genre: Rock
- Occupations: Musician, producer, composer

Daniel Francis Luscombe is an Australian guitarist, producer, and composer. He has collaborated with many musicians, been a member of several bands, including The Blackeyed Susans, The Drones, and Dan Kelly and the Alpha Males, and has composed music for films and TV.

== Early life ==
Luscombe was born in Melbourne, Victoria.

== Career ==
Luscombe has been a member of The Blackeyed Susans, The Drones, Dan Kelly and the Alpha Males, Stardust Five, Spencer P. Jones & the Last Gasp and Paul Kelly and the Boon Companions, as well as playing alongside Courtney Barnett, Mick Harvey, Ariel Pink, Damo Suzuki, James Chance and Marlon Williams as a touring member of their bands. He has also produced albums for artists including Ben Salter, Fraser Gorman, Jaala, Bad Dreems, Martin Frawley, Courtney Barnett and Amyl and the Sniffers. He has composed for film with credits including Jindabyne, Hounds of Love and I Am Mother (2019).

Along with Paul Kelly, Katie Brianna, and the Stormwater Boys he won the 2006 ARIA Award for Best Original Soundtrack, Cast or Show Album for their soundtrack to Jindabyne. With co-composer Antony Partos he won the 2019 APRA/AGSC Screen Music Award for Best Feature Film Score for I Am Mother.

In collaboration with Gareth Liddiard, Luscombe wrote the score of Warwick Thornton's 2021/22 vampire TV series, Firebite. Jim White, drummer of The Dirty Three, joined them to perform the music for the series.

Luscombe was responsible for the score of Jasmin Tarasin's 2026 drama film Life Could Be a Dream, which included original tracks by Polish pianist Hania Rani and Australian musical duo Time for Dreams..

== Personal life ==
His older brother Peter Luscombe is also a musician: both were members of Paul Kelly and the Boon Companions from 2002 to 2007.

== Discography ==
=== Albums ===
List of albums, with selected details
Title	Details
There Is Nothing Here That Belongs to You (with Rob Snarski)	Released: 2002; Format: CD; Label: Quietly Suburban Recordings (QSR013)
Jindabyne (soundtrack) (with Paul Kelly, Katie Brianna and the Stormwater Boys)	Released: 2006; Format: CD; Label: Capitol Records (0946 3 69 47525)

== Awards and nominations ==
=== APRA Awards ===
The APRA Awards are presented annually from 1982 by the Australasian Performing Right Association (APRA), "honouring composers and songwriters".

Year	Nominee / work	Award	Result	Ref.
2014	"A Moat You Can Stand In" by The Drones (Stephen Hesketh/ Fiona Kitchin/ Gareth Liddiard/ Dan Luscombe/ Mike Noga)	Song of the Year	Nominated	
2019	I Am Mother (Dan Luscombe, Antony Partos)	Feature Film Score of the Year	Won	

=== ARIA Music Awards ===
The ARIA Music Awards is an annual awards ceremony that recognises excellence, innovation, and achievement across all genres of Australian music. They commenced in 1987.

Year	Nominee / work	Award	Result	Ref.
2006	Jindabyne (Note: The nomination is shared with fellow composer / performer, Paul Kelly, Katie Brianna and the Stormwater Boys.)	Best Original Soundtrack, Cast or Show Album	Won	
2022	Amyl and the Sniffers & Dan Luscombe for Amyl and the Sniffers – Comfort to Me	Producer – Best Produced Album	Nominated	
