= Gareth Liddiard =

Australian musician

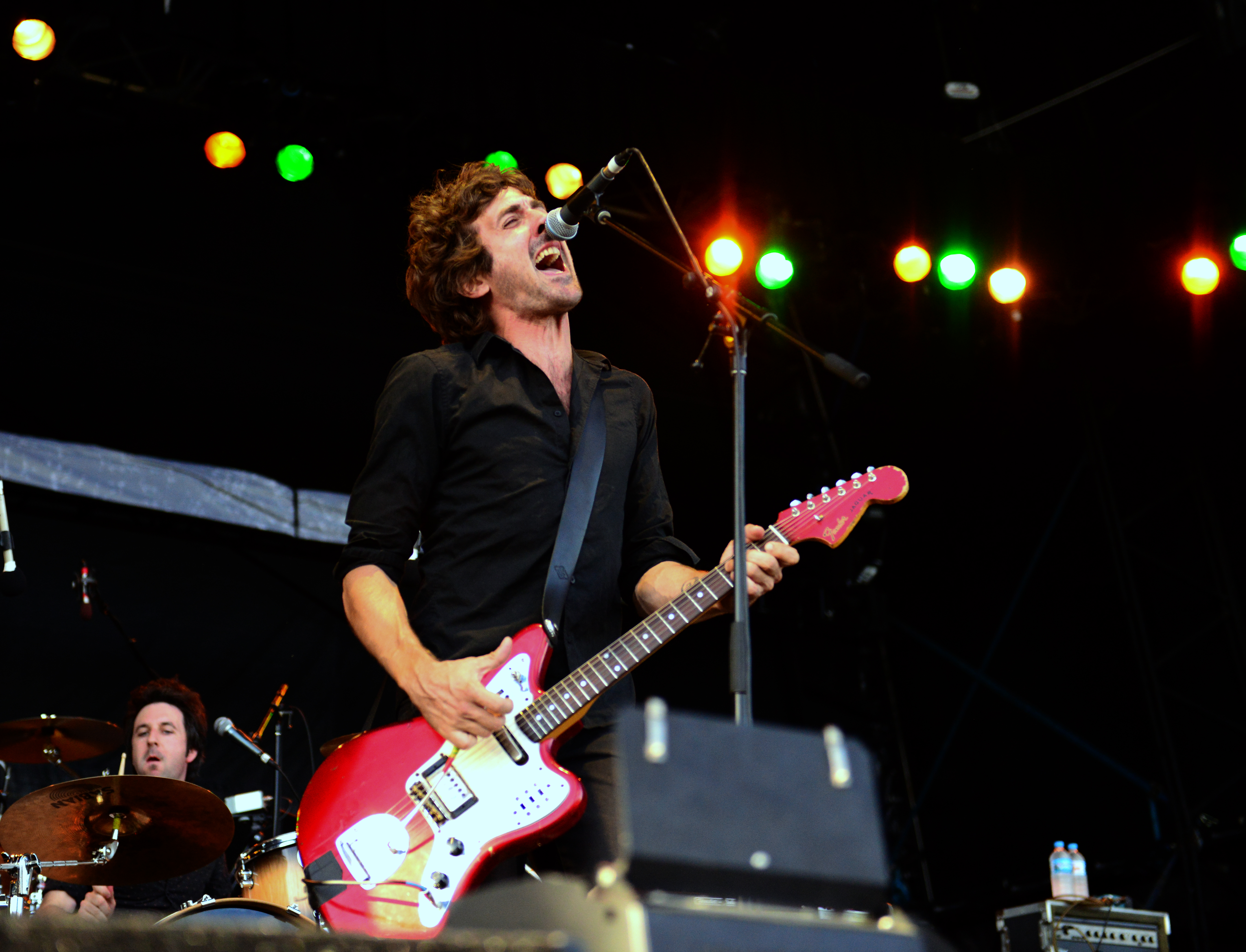
- Liddiard performing live with the Drones at A Day on the Green, Hunter Valley, March 2013

Background information
- Born: Port Hedland, Western Australia, Australia
- Origin: Perth, Western Australia, Australia
- Member of: Tropical Fuck Storm; Springtime; The Drones

Gareth Liddiard is an Australian musician, best known as a founding member of both the Drones and Tropical Fuck Storm. Musically active since 1997, he also released a solo album titled Strange Tourist in 2010.

== Early life and education ==
Liddiard was born in Port Hedland, Western Australia.

His family lived in south-west London before returning to WA, where he started school in Perth. Initially his musical interest lay in jazz, and he began playing the saxophone, but he eventually found his way to rock and roll music. He started playing in bands during his high school years at Duncraig High School. As a teenager, Liddiard listened to the music of artists such as Led Zeppelin, Jimi Hendrix, Black Flag, and John Coltrane.

At the age of 18, Liddiard gained employment with a concert lighting firm in Perth and remained in this role for seven years, working with festivals such as the Big Day Out and bands such as Kim Salmon and the Surrealists. Liddiard said in 2013: "Everything came together slowly and organically. It was only when Rui Pereira (high school friend) and I moved to Melbourne in 2000 that we thought of trying to make some money out of music. Before that I'd never considered the idea of being an entertainer."

== Music career ==
Liddiard was a founding member of both the Drones and Tropical Fuck Storm.

He formed the Drones with Pereira in 1997 and then relocated with the band to Victoria in 2000. The Drones have released six studio albums since 2002 and have toured throughout the world, including music festivals.

Liddiard released his debut solo album in 2010, Strange Tourist He completed corresponding tours with support from artists such as Sydney musician Loene Carmen. The album earned him a nomination for a 2011 ARIA Award for Best Male Artist.

He has been praised as a songwriter, and the Drones song "Shark Fin Blues", penned by Liddiard and Rui Pereira, was voted by the band's contemporaries as the greatest Australian song of all time in 2009.

Together with Pereira, who left the Drones line-up, Liddiard contributed to the production of a self-titled album by Perth band Gutterville Splendour Six in 2013. He played guitar on 14 songs, in addition to undertaking mixing and recording. All of the album's songs were recorded on an ADAT eight-track machine and the album was released as a vinyl record on Spanish record label Bang! Records.

In 2021, Liddiard recorded and performed live with Jim White of the Dirty Three and Chris Abrahams of The Necks as Springtime.

In collaboration with Dan Luscombe, Liddiard co-wrote the score for Warwick Thornton's 2021/22 vampire TV series, Firebite. Jim White, drummer of The Dirty Three, joined them to perform the music for the series.

=== Musical influences ===
Liddiard has cited Dimitri Shostakovich, Igor Stravinsky, The Stooges, North African music and Olivier Messiaen as musical influences. He has named Dylan Thomas, Flann O'Brien, W. B. Yeats, Carl Sagan and Kurt Vonnegut as influences on his lyricism. Regarding his own lyrics, Liddiard stated in 2013: "I read but I'm not that widely read. I don't know. They're just words for songs. That's all they are. Yeah, they're sometimes funny. You've got to be funny; life's funny."

== Personal life ==
As of May 2019, Liddiard is a vegan and resides in the rural town of Nagambie, Victoria, Australia with Drones bassist Fiona Kitschin and two fox terriers. Prior to Nagambie, the pair lived in the rural Victorian town of Myrtleford. The Nagambie property, next to the Goulburn River, was the recording location for the 2013 Drones album I See Seaweed. Liddiard explained the location's attributes in a media interview: "It's as good as anywhere for writing, but the main thing is it's cheap, [...] There's a huge amount of room. We have a billabong, there's a swampland, a creek, we're on the river. It's nice."

Liddiard was living in the same area as the Black Saturday bushfires of 2009 and subsequently obtained a 75 series Landcruiser Troop Carrier vehicle in the event of such an incident in the future. Liddiard explained in 2013 that "it's basically our ticket out of the next bushfire. In the last fires we had a 1990 Ford Falcon which wouldn't have been much use once a tree fell across the only road out of our valley."

== Discography ==
=== Studio albums ===
List of studio albums, with selected details
Title	Album details
Strange Tourist	Released: October 2010; Label: Gareth Liddiard (GL001); Formats: CD, digital download
Bong Odyssey: Recordings 1993-98 (with Rui Pereira)	Released: 2018; Label: Bang! Records (BANG!-LP115); Formats: 2x LP, digital download
Springtime (with Springtime)	Released: November 2021; Label: TFS Records/Joyful Noise; Formats: LP, CD, digital download
Night Raver EP (with Springtime)	Released: March 2022; Label: TFS Records/Joyful Noise; Formats: LP, CD, digital download

== Awards and nominations ==
=== APRA Awards ===
The APRA Awards are presented annually from 1982 by the Australasian Performing Right Association (APRA), "honouring composers and songwriters".

Year	Nominee / work	Award	Result	Ref.
2014	"A Moat You Can Stand In" by the Drones (Stephen Hesketh/ Fiona Kitchin/ Gareth Liddiard/ Dan Luscombe/ Mike Noga)	Song of the Year	Nominated	
2019	"Paradise" by Tropical Fuck Storm ((Erica Dunn / Gareth Liddiard / Fiona Kitchin / Lauren Hammel)	Song of the Year	Shortlisted	
2026	"Goon Show" by Tropical Fuck Storm ((Erica Dunn / Gareth Liddiard / Fiona Kitchin / Lauren Hammel)	Song of the Year	Shortlisted	

|}

=== ARIA Music Awards ===
The ARIA Music Awards is an annual awards ceremony that recognises excellence, innovation, and achievement across all genres of Australian music.

Year	Nominee / work	Award	Result
2011	Strange Tourist	Best Male Artist	Nominated

=== Australian Music Prize ===
The Australian Music Prize (the AMP) is an annual award of $30,000 given to an Australian band or solo artist in recognition of the merit of an album released during the year of award. The commenced in 2005.

Year	Nominee / work	Award	Result
2010	Strange Tourist	Australian Music Prize	Nominated

=== Music Victoria Awards ===
The Music Victoria Awards, are an annual awards night celebrating Victorian music. They commenced in 2005.

Year	Nominee / work	Award	Result	Ref.
2018	Gareth Liddiard	Best Male Musician	Nominated	
2019	Gareth Liddiard	Best Male Musician	Nominated	

=== National Live Music Awards ===
The National Live Music Awards (NLMAs) are a broad recognition of Australia's diverse live industry, celebrating the success of the Australian live scene. The awards commenced in 2016.

Year	Nominee / work	Award	Result
2016	Gareth Liddiard	Live Guitarist of the Year	Won
2018	Gareth Liddiard	Live Guitarist of the Year	Won
