= Machine Translations =

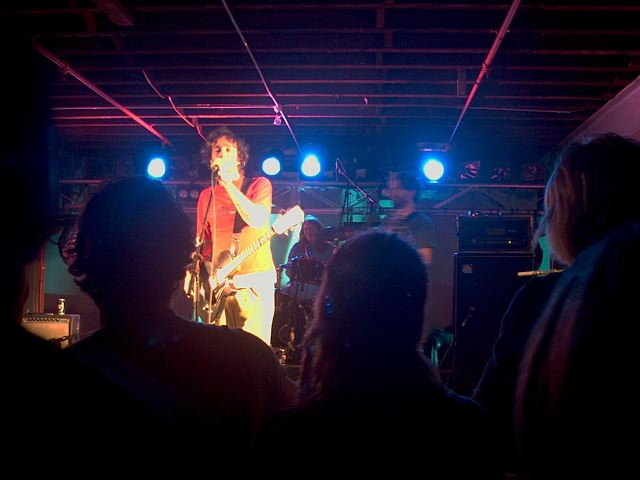
- Machine Translations, with J. Walker at front left, performing at the Cockatoo Island festival, March 2005

Background information
- Born: Greg James Walker; 1967 (age 58–59); Canberra, Australian Capital Territory, Australia
- Genres: Rock, pop, alternative rock
- Occupations: Singer-songwriter, musician, producer, engineer
- Instruments: Guitar, piano, keyboards, vocals
- Years active: 1985–present
- Labels: Way Over There, Shock, Spunk!
- Website: machinetranslations.com.au

Machine Translations is the performing name of Greg James Walker (born 1967), an Australian singer, songwriter and multi-instrumentalist; who is also a producer as J Walker. Walker started out recording all instruments himself in a home studio and later branched out to include a band.

Machine Translations' songs vary between simple guitar melodies and complex works with unusual instruments—a spectrum from pop to art. Since 1997 Walker has released several albums. In 2001 he toured the United States supporting Dirty Three. As a composer Walker has been nominated at the APRA Music Awards of 2005 for Best Music for a Documentary for Girl in a Mirror: A Portrait of Carol Jerrems; in 2008 for Best Soundtrack Album for East of Everything; and in 2012 for Best Music for a Television Series or Serial and Best Television Theme for Miss Fisher's Murder Mysteries.

== Biography ==
Greg James Walker, who works as J Walker or Machine Translations, was raised in Canberra. His mother, Valda, is a classically trained vocalist. He has an older brother and sister, and together with his mother, they encouraged him to learn piano and guitar. He attended Narrabundah Secondary College, where he learned synthesiser, multi-track recording and musical composition. By 1985 Walker, on keyboards, was a member of local psychedelic band, Moon, with Paul Davies on bass guitar and lead vocals; Chris Freney on guitar; and Ralph Rehak on drums. Kathryn Whitfield of Pulse caught their performance in May 1986: "their lighting effects are reminiscent of the sixties oil lights with a kaleidoscope of coloured lights floating across the stage". In 2003 Walker recalled "[he] played in a succession of 'funny little Canberra bands'".

By July 1995 Walker was working in a home studio in his garden shed. Under the name Shed Method he issued a cassette album, Machine Translations, which included the track "Jezebel". Nick Enfield of The Canberra Times described the album as "an eclectic mix of his unique array of original sounds". Walker had been recording for over ten years making his own demos and producing other local artists. His lo-fi (music) approach included using traditional instruments: drums, guitars and keyboards; together with less conventional ones: broken piano (its front removed and strings played directly), oud, and electric erhu. His influences were John Cale, Nico and Tom Waits while also "listening to a lot of belly-dancing music lately, as well as Chinese classical music, and Indian music". One of Walker's associates on the album was Kevin White.

Walker was also a member of P. Harness, which Enfield opined were "madcap ocker goons", with Geoff Hinchcliffe on guitar and lead vocals; and Mikel Simic on drums and lead vocals. By August 1995 they released their second album, @ction. Simic described its underlying theme: "all the songs are specifically about eating, [or] they've got food references through them". In October that year Walker and White supplied the music for a stage play, The Fortress, at Studio One, Braddon. Walker completed his tertiary studies in Shanghai with a degree in Linguistics and Mandarin Chinese. He also lived in India "absorbing musical influences".

Upon return to Australia Walker continued his musical career living near Wollongong. His album, Abstract Poverty, was released in 1997 on the Way Over There label. Hans Uhad of Stylus Magazine felt it showed a "juxtaposition of slow burning, moody, Codeine-like numbers with deft, mildly psychotic stabs at fusing traditional Celtic music with his own burnt version of Americana and flamenco". One of the tracks, "Jezebel", was a re-recorded version of his earlier work as Shed Method. For touring Walker expanded the band with Guy Freer on accordion and keyboards; Marianthe Loucataris on drums; and Jonathan Nix on bass and samples. Machine Translations' second album, Halo, appeared in the following year on Way Over There and was distributed by Shock Records. White provided clarinet for the album.

His next album on Way Over There was Holiday in Spain which was released in 1999. Kelsey Munro of The Sydney Morning Herald felt the album was a "criminally ignored underground classic". Comes with a Smile's Matt Dornan noted there is "no disguising the homemade feel of both music and sparse packaging, but there's certainly a twisted core to this antipodean walkabout through sonic pastures new". Walker co-produced the album with Kimmo Vennon, he also used guest vocalists including Kirsty Stegwazi. Walker had provided guitar on tracks for Stegwazi's solo album, Keep Still (1999). At times Machine Translations performed with White aboard under the name Thing of a Thousand Strings.

In 2000 he worked on his next album, Bad Shapes (21 May 2001). Walker was joined in the studio by Freer on saxophone and accordion; Loucataris on lead vocals, drums and percussion; Nix on double bass; White on clarinet, broken piano and percussion; and Gemma Clare on cello; Kazuaki Nakahara on banjo, electric and classical guitars; Elmo Reed on lead vocals and electric guitar; and Melissa Owl. It was issued on Spunk! Records and achieved critical acclaim and "got everyone paying attention". Walker described collaborating with Freer, Loucataris, and Nix: "We've known each other for at least 10 years ... I really enjoy working with them, and writing with them, because, doing what I do, I know my own tricks, but with the group there's far less chance of stagnation".

Bad Shapes provided "Poor Circle", a "radio-friendly" single which was "[i]rresistibly fresh, bent and poppy" according to The Age's Jo Roberts. After the album appeared Walker moved to Melbourne. He toured the eastern states of Australia and then in late 2001 Machine Translations supported instrumental group, Dirty Three, on a ten‑day tour of the United States. Walker's group then toured Europe including a gig in Paris on a boat in the Seine.

In October 2002 the group released their next album, Happy, which Munro felt was "an advance on its predecessors with elements of acoustic pop ... warped Middle Eastern flavours, weirdly joyful and layered melodies, and robotically beautiful, Stereolab-type vocal cut-ups and loops". Neil Strauss described it in The New York Times as a "precious mix of light orchestration, inward-gazing songwriting and post-rock experimentation". It provided two singles, "Amnesia" and "She Wears a Mask". Tommo Eitelhuber felt the tracks had "enough unique charm to make them noticable [sic]".

During the next year Walker co-produced, engineered and mixed an album, A Minor Revival (August 2003), for folk rock duo, Sodastream. He also supplied electric and slide guitars, viola and keyboards. Machine Translations released a seven-track extended play, Love on the Vine (late 2003). The title track had backing vocals by Clare Bowditch and Karen Tua, Tua also provided keyboards on another track. The EP was followed by a studio album, Venus Traps Fly, in May 2004. For Eitelhuber the album was "even more disappointing" than Happy with it being "pleasantly enjoyable in the short term, but repetitive and uninspiring in the long term". However Bernard Zuel of The Sydney Morning Herald noted that Walker's "language is elliptical, the emotions often very clear but their carriage wrapped up in lines that remain elusive" and that he "used more concrete images for the decidedly concrete emotions of his characters" for "another sublime pop album".

By February 2004 Walker had joined Clare Bowditch & the Feeding Set on erhu, electric guitar, rhodes synthesiser and viola. The group included Bowditch on vocals and guitar; and her domestic partner Marty Brown (of Sodastream and Art of Fighting) on multiple instruments and producing; they recorded an album, Autumn Bone. Walker also toured with the band, and, as a member of the Feeding Set, he contributed to three extended plays and another album, What Was Left (October 2005).

In June 2004, to promote Venus Traps Fly, Machine Translations toured with a line-up of Walker on vocals and guitar; Tua on keyboards and backing vocals; Iain Downie on bass guitar; and Kjirsten Robb on drums. Michael Dwyer of The Age saw their gig at the Corner Hotel and was impressed by Walker's "considered approach to live dynamics, arrangements beautifully designed around his conversational vocal style" and he was "a pretty flash guitarist, his modal solos and big, chunky rhythm freak-outs bringing plenty of excitement". Bowditch guested on lead vocals for a track, "Simple Life", with "a splash of high glamour in a too-brief cameo".

In 2005 Walker composed the score for ABC TV documentary, Girl in a Mirror: A Portrait of Carol Jerrems, on the life of Australian photographer Carol Jerrems. At the APRA Music Awards of 2005 Walker's work was nominated for Best Music for a Documentary. In October that year Machine Translations issued another EP, Wolf on a String, with six tracks. Zuel noted it had "an acoustic, low-profile feel" while mostly "the mood is languorous" however "there is menace in 'A Ghost Rides' and insistent percussion bringing on some disturbance in 'Extress'". By that time Walker and his domestic partner Tua were living in Jumbunna.

On 8 June 2005 ABC Digital Radio broadcast a cover version of Willie Dixon's "Spoonful" by Machine Translations with C. W. Stoneking as the first part of The DiG Australian Blues Project. The program described their interpretation as "fantastically twisted" including a "brilliantly 'outside' guitar solo near the end". Walker recalled that at 16 or 17 he was "listening to a lot of old blues, more country style blues ... [it] really affected me, just the rawness of it and the sincerity of it". Walker produced Stoneking's albums King Hokum (2005) and Jungle Blues (October 2008). The latter provided Stoneking with an ARIA Award in 2009 for Best Roots and Blues Album and four other nominations.

Machine Translations' next album, Seven Seven, appeared in October 2007. Zuel finds Walker is "as unfussy a musician as you could find" and provides a "feeling of great calm" where "[t]hings happen but they happen naturally". Dan Rule of The Age felt it was "stunningly organic" as Walker "weaves a shimmering layer of acoustic nuance and texture throughout". Walker composed the score and Machine Translations contributed to the soundtrack for ABC-TV drama series East of Everything (March 2008 – September 2009). Walker's "A Most Peculiar Place" was used as the show's theme: it had originally appeared on Machine Translations' album, Happy. Walker has a cameo as a singer-songwriter in episode five where he performs "Don't Give Up on Me Just Yet". At the APRA Music Awards of 2008 Walker was nominated for Best Soundtrack Album for East of Everything Series One Soundtrack Album.

In 2009 Walker composed original music for ABC-TV's documentary series, Bombora – The History of Australian Surfing. He contributed music for Mother of Rock: The Life and Times of Lillian Roxon (August 2010), a documentary film on Australian rock music journalist, Lillian Roxon. The film was showcased at that year's Melbourne International Film Festival. Premiering at that festival was a comedy-drama feature film, The Wedding Party, with a soundtrack which included work by Walker and by Bowditch.

Graeme Blundell of The Australian previewed an ABC-TV documentary, Then the Wind Changed (February 2012), on the Black Saturday bushfires and noted that it is "a beautifully made film, crafted with compassion, alternating the sounds of destruction with the silence left behind, intercut with noise of rebuilding lives and structures and heightened with a compelling score from [Walker]". Walker also worked for ABC-TV on Miss Fisher's Murder Mysteries (February 2012 – December 2013) composing the theme music and score. At the APRA Music Awards of 2012 the work was nominated for both Best Music for a Television Series or Serial and for Best Television Theme.

During July and August 2012 Walker co-produced Spring and Fall for Paul Kelly, which was recorded in a hall in Jumbunna. Walker was also used on upright bass guitar, dobro, violin and harmonica; as well as Paul's nephew Dan Kelly on acoustic guitar and harmony vocals. Walker had produced tracks on albums for Dan's earlier band the Alpha Males: The Tabloid Blues (March 2004) and Drowning in the Fountain of Youth (August 2006). During August 2013 and then December that year Walker joined Paul's backing band to tour in support of Spring and Fall.

On 11 October 2013 Machine Translations issued the eighth studio album, The Bright Door. Beat Magazine's Chris Girdler sees Walker chronicling the "complications and anxieties of growing older" with life's "highs and lows" captured by "its gentle, harmonious songs harbouring a sense of discord and foreboding".

== Discography ==
=== Albums ===
Shed Method

- Machine Translations (1995)

Machine Translations

- Abstract Poverty (1997)
- Halo (1998)
- Holiday in Spain (1999)
- Bad Shapes (21 May 2001) Spunk! Records, Festival Mushroom Records (URA044)
- Happy (October 2002) Spunk! Records
- Venus Traps Fly (May 2004) Spunk! Records
- Seven Seven (22 October 2007) Spunk! Records / EMI
- The Bright Door (2013)
- Oh (2017)

=== Extended plays ===
- Love on the Vine (late 2003) Spunk! Records
- Wolf on a String (October 2005) Spunk! Records / Inertia Records
