= Spring and Fall (album) =

Studio album by Paul Kelly
- Released: 19 October 2012
- Recorded: July–August 2012; South Gippsland
- Genre: Folk rock
- Length: 35:18
- Labels: Gawd Aggie, Universal
- Producers: Paul Kelly, Dan Kelly, Greg "J" Walker

Paul Kelly chronology
The A – Z Recordings (2010)	Spring and Fall (2012)	Conversations with Ghosts (2013)

Singles from Spring and Fall
- 1. "New Found Year" Released: 1 October 2012

Spring and Fall is the nineteenth studio album by Australian folk rock singer-songwriter Paul Kelly which was issued in October 2012 on his own label, Gawd Aggie and distributed via Universal Music. It is due to be issued in Europe and United States in November. The release is his first studio album since Stolen Apples in 2007, and is a concept album as a song cycle "which focuses on a love story told from different points of view". It was produced by Kelly, Dan Kelly (his nephew), and Greg "J" Walker (C. W. Stoneking, The Whitlams) and was available as a digipak or digital download. The lead single, "New Found Year", was released in early October ahead of the album's release. The album debuted on the ARIA Albums Chart at number eight.

== Background ==
Spring and Fall is the nineteenth studio album by Paul Kelly, an Australian singer-songwriter. After releasing his live 8× CD box set, The A – Z Recordings in September 2010, for about a year-and-a-half, Kelly was performing and being filmed for a musical documentary, Paul Kelly: Stories of Me (November 2012). Afterwards Kelly began work on Spring and Fall – its recording started in July 2012 using an old country hall in South Gippsland where he was joined by his nephew, Dan Kelly, and Machine Translations' Greg "J" Walker. It was mixed by Andy Stewart (Gotye, The Whitlams, C.W. Stoneking, Brighter Later) at The Mill in mid-August and was produced by Kelly, Dan and Walker (C. W. Stoneking, The Whitlams).

Kelly had written about two-thirds of the album's tracks over the previous year-and-a-half but some were up to five years-old. Kelly developed a song cycle which encouraged people to listen to the album in its entirety with each track leading into the next.

The lead single, "New Found Year", a digital download only release, was released on 1 October 2012 ahead of the album. "New Found Year" is a love song that borrows words from 16th Century English poet, John Donne's "To His Mistress Going to Bed".

== Reception ==
Professional ratings
Review scores
Source	Rating
The Age	Favourable
The Brag	4.5/5 stars
FasterLouder	8/10 stars

The Age's reviewer Chris Johnson found that Spring and Fall was "a beautiful and simple album, with so much of the beauty to be found in its simplicity. Stripped back and raw, the 11 tracks ... amount to a gently piercing musical experience that is hard to turn away from. This is Kelly at his finest – finest songwriting, singing and musicianship". The Brag's Natalie Arnat praised how even though "each song is strong enough to stand alone, the album is most rewarding when listened to in its entirety. The songs blossom when they flow on from one another, with lushly layered instruments adorning the arrangements, from harmonica and dobro to violin". ABC Sunshine Coast's Annie Gaffney was impressed by the cover painting "it's a bit Gauguin ... beautiful soft image of a man and a woman". While Kelly felt "it looks like a painting from the ... 20s or 30s, it looks very European".

The album debuted on the ARIA Albums Chart at number eight.

== Track listing ==
All tracks written by Paul Kelly unless otherwise indicated.

1. "New Found Year" (Paul Kelly, Dan Kelly) – 3:39
2. "When a Woman Loves a Man" – 3:50
3. "For the Ages" (Paul Kelly, Dan Kelly) – 2:37
4. "Gonna Be Good" – 3:33
5. "Someone New" – 3:18
6. "Time and Tide" (Paul Kelly, Alan Pigram) – 3:20
7. "Sometimes My Baby" – 2:50
8. "Cold As Canada" – 2:40
9. "I'm on Your Side" (Paul Kelly, Dan Kelly) – 3:19
10. "None of Your Business Now" – 3:05
11. "Little Aches and Pains" – 3:07

Some (maybe all?) copies of the CD have a hidden bonus track included with track 11. "Little Aches & Pains" goes for around 3:00 minutes followed by about 67 seconds of silence and then from 4:07 there is an uncredited song of 2:00 minutes length probably called "Oh Mistress Mine" with 12-string guitar backing. This latter song may also draw from John Donne's poetry as noted for track 1.

Regarding the hidden track "Mistress Mine", the following information from Paul Kelly's web site sheds light on the song: "Dan and I played to a rambunctious crowd last night at the beautiful old Cadogan Hall. Sang "Mistress Mine", the hidden track from Spring and Fall, for the first time ever in public. Lyrics by Will Shakespeare. Messed them up so hope to do better by the Bard next time. Today we drive to Glasgow. Dan's looking for good vegie food, I'm looking for good coffee. Any tips? PK."

== Personnel ==
Core musicians

- Paul Kelly – acoustic guitar, lead vocals
- Dan Kelly – acoustic guitar, harmony vocals
- Greg "J" Walker – upright bass guitar, dobro, violin, harmonica

Guest musicians

- Dan Luscombe – piano
- Peter Luscombe – drums, percussion
- Linda Bull – vocals
- Vika Bull – vocals
- Laura Jean – vocals
- Andy Stewart - vocals and drums
- Atila and Karoline Kuti – violin, viola, cello
- Genevieve Lacey – recorder

Production work

- Producer – Paul Kelly, Dan Kelly, Greg "J" Walker
- Mixer – Andy Stewart, Greg "J" Walker

Art work

- Cover design – Peter Salmon-Lomas, Salmon Design
- Painting – Catharina Luczyk

== Charts ==
Chart (2012)	Peak position
Australian Albums (ARIA)	8

== Certifications ==
Region	Certification	Certified units/sales
Australia (ARIA)	Gold	35,000^{^}
^{^} Shipments figures based on certification alone.
