= AIR Awards of 2006 =

1st edition of annual Australian music award

- Date: 29 November 2006
- Venue: Blacket Hotel, Sydney, Australia
- Hosted by: Angela Catterns

Highlights
- Most wins: Hilltop Hoods (2)
- Most nominations: Hilltop Hoods (3)
- Website: https://air.org.au/air-awards/

The first annual Australian Independent Record Labels Association Music Awards (generally known as the AIR Awards) was an award ceremony in Australia on 29 November 2006 to honour outstanding achievements in sales by Australian independent artists.

The shortlisted nominees for AIR Awards were announced in October 2006, with the sponsor of V energy drinks.

== Performers ==
- Gotye
- The Basics

== Nominees and winners ==
=== AIR Awards ===
Winners are listed first and highlighted in boldface; other final nominees are listed alphabetically by artists' first name.

Best Independent Artist of the Year	Best Performing Independent Album
**Hilltop Hoods**; Ben Lee; John Butler Trio; Lior; Pendulum; The Herd	**Hilltop Hoods – The Hard Road (Obese Records)**; Ben Lee – Awake Is the New Sleep (Inertia Records); John Butler Trio – Live at St. Gallen (Jarrah Records); Lior – Autumn Flow (Senso Unico); Pendulum – Hold Your Colour (Breakbeat Kaos); The Herd – The Sun Never Sets (Elefant Traks)
Best Performing Single / EP	Most Outstanding New Independent Artist
**Blue King Brown – Blue King Brown (Roots Level)**; Behind Crimson Eyes – Prologue: The Art of War (Boomtown Records); Hilltop Hoods – "Clown Prince" (ROOTS LEVEL); Karnivool – "Persona" (Independent); The Grates – The Ouch. The Touch. (Dew Process)	**Gotye**; Behind Crimson Eyes; Blue King Brown; Jen Cloher; Karnivool; The Drones

== See also ==
- Music of Australia
