= Wound of a Little Horse =

EP by Witch Hats
- Released: (Australia) 13 November 2006
- Recorded: 2006
- Genre: Post-punk
- Length: 19:00
- Label: In-Fidelity Recordings
- Producer: Phill Calvert/Ben Ling

Witch Hats chronology
Wound of a Little Horse (2006)	Cellulite Soul (2008)

Professional ratings
Review scores
Source	Rating
Mess + Noise	Positive

Wound of a Little Horse is the debut EP by the Australian alternative rock and post-punk band Witch Hats, released through In-Fidelity Recordings on 13 November 2006.

The album was produced by Ben Ling and Phill Calvert of The Birthday Party. The artwork pays a loose homage to the banned "Butcher" cover by The Beatles, and was photographed in an abandoned orphanage in St Kilda.

== Track listing ==
No.	Title	Length
1.	"Pepperman"	3:37
2.	"Ma Birthday"	5:26
3.	"Jock The Untold"	4:26
4.	"Heartaches"	2:09
5.	"Stupid Arrangements"	2:50
