= The Tabloid Blues =

Studio album by Dan Kelly & The Alpha Males
- Released: 15 March 2004
- Recorded: Atlantis, and Sing Sing Studios; 2003
- Genre: Indie rock
- Label: In-Fidelity Records
- Producer: Magoo, Dave McLuney, Greg Walker & Craing Harnath

Dan Kelly & The Alpha Males chronology
The Tabloid Blues (2004)	Drowning in the Fountain of Youth (2006)

The Tabloid Blues (a.k.a. Dan Kelly and the Alpha Males sing the Tabloid Blues) is the debut album by Australian act Dan Kelly and the Alpha Males.

The album was released on 15 March 2004 on In-Fidelity Records and distributed by Shock Records.

== Track listing ==
All tracks written by Dan Kelly, except where noted.

1. "Checkout Cutie" (Dan Kelly, S. Jones) – 2:24
2. "Step Forward" – 3:49
3. "Bunk Lovin' Man" – 4:17
4. "All On My Lonesome" – 4:33
5. "Summer Wino" – 4:54
6. "Human Sea" – 3:07
7. "Lutheran Hall" – 4:29
8. "Get High On Yr Own Supply" – 3:49
9. "The Tabloid Blues" – 4:45
10. "Pregnant Conversation" – 3:16
11. "A Town Called Sadness" – 4:25
12. "River O Tears" (Dan Kelly, Gareth Liddiard) – 4:22

== Personnel ==
- Dan Kelly – Guitar, vocals
- Gareth Liddiard – Bass, Vocals
- Tom Carlyon – Guitar, keyboards
- Christian Strybosch – drums
