= Cellulite Soul =

Studio album by Witch Hats
- Released: (Australia) 26 March 2008
- Recorded: 2007
- Genres: Alternative rock, post-punk revival
- Length: 42:00
- Label: In-Fidelity Recordings
- Producer: Phill Calvert/Ben Ling

Witch Hats chronology
Wound of a Little Horse (2006)	Cellulite Soul (2008)	Solarium Down the Causeway (2009)

Singles from Cellulite Soul
- 1. "Before I Weigh" Released: November 2007; 2. "Hellhole" Released: December 2008

Professional ratings
Review scores
Source	Rating
Polaroids of Androids	9.4/10
I-94 Bar	5/5 stars
The Vine	Positive
Mess + Noise	Positive
onezerosixnine	Positive

Cellulite Soul is the debut studio album by the Australian alternative rock and post-punk band Witch Hats, released through In-Fidelity Recordings on 26 March 2008.

The album was produced by Ben Ling and Phill Calvert of The Birthday Party. The track "Before I Weigh" was released as a 7-inch single prior to the album's release in November 2007. While on tour in the US, they released a second 7-inch single for "Hellhole" on the New York indie label New York Night Train. In 2009, "Hellhole" appeared in Sean Byrne's Australian horror film The Loved Ones. The album is littered with deliberate lyrical spelling errors, including 6 of the 10 track's titles.

== Track listing ==
No.	Title	Length
1.	"Before I Weigh"	5:32
2.	"I Cant Stay at Home"	2:58
3.	"Climbing Up Yr Cable"	4:10
4.	"Western'"	3:58
5.	"Hellhole"	4:28
6.	"Potato Feet"	3:12
7.	"Summer of Pain"	3:39
8.	"Ma Lord"	1:56
9.	"Neil Diamond Entry"	3:38
10.	"Doors Film"	8:25
