= Solarium Down the Causeway =

EP by Witch Hats
- Released: September 2009 (Australia)
- Recorded: August 2008
- Genre: Post-punk
- Length: 20:30
- Label: Z-Man Records; Sony/ATV
- Producer: Phill Calvert/Greg Ashley

Witch Hats chronology
Cellulite Soul (2008)	Solarium Down the Causeway (2009)	Pleasure Syndrome (2011)

Professional ratings
Review scores
Source	Rating
RTRFM	Positive
thedwarf.com.au	Positive
Rave Magazine (Australia)	Positive
The Vine	Positive

Solarium Down the Causeway is the second EP by the Australian alternative rock and post-punk band Witch Hats, released on Z-Man Records in September 2009.

The EP was mixed by their long-time producer, Phill Calvert of The Birthday Party. Most of the album was recorded in Oakland, California while the band was on their US tour promoting Cellulite Soul. The EP was recorded by Greg Ashley of The Gris Gris. The album title is a loose reference to seeing people sun-bathing in the aqueducts of Los Angeles. They filmed the video clip for their song, "Check the Center" in an Arizonian desert. In a 2013 interview with the online publication Shanghai 247, font-man and primary songwriter Kris Buscombe recalled firing a 9mm pistol through the roof of the studio during the recording sessions of the EP.

By the time the record was released in 2009, drummer Duncan Blachford had already left the band.

== Track listing ==
No.	Title	Length
1.	"Stomach in Your Hair"	2:06
2.	"Check The Center"	2:21
3.	"Pleasure Syndrome"	2:14
4.	"Fucking with the Atmosphere"	4:46
5.	"Sessa (Son of a Silo Salesman)"	5:02
6.	"I Am Parolling"	3:41

=== Vinyl Version ===
A 10-inch vinyl version of Solarium Down The Causeway was also released.

A-side

1. "Stomach in Your Hair" - 2:06
2. "Check The Center" - 2:21
3. "Pleasure Syndrome" - 2:14
4. "Fucking with the Atmosphere" - 4:46

B-side

1. "Sessa (Son of a Silo Salesman)" - 5:02
2. "I Am Parolling" - 3:41
