= Pleasure Syndrome =

Studio album by Witch Hats
- Released: (Australia) 14 October 2011
- Recorded: 2011
- Genres: Alternative rock, post-punk revival
- Length: 40:45
- Labels: Longtime Listener; BMG
- Producer: Casey Rice

Witch Hats chronology
Solarium Down the Causeway (2009)	Pleasure Syndrome (2011)

Singles from Pleasure Syndrome
- 1. "Hear Martin" Released: August 2011; 2. "In the Mortuary" Released: January 2012

Professional ratings
Review scores
Source	Rating
The Australian	4.5/5 stars
Rave Magazine Australia	4.5/5 stars
The AU Review	9.5/10
Mess+Noise	Positive

Pleasure Syndrome is the second studio album by the Australian alternative rock/post-punk band Witch Hats, released through Longtime Listener/BMG on 14 October 2011.

The album was produced by US-born producer/engineer Casey Rice (Dirty Three, Tortoise). Guitarist Tom Barry left the group shortly after the recording sessions of Pleasure Syndrome and was quickly replaced by Robert Wrigley.

A video clip for "Hear Martin" was released (view here) in August 2011, which was followed by a second clip for "In the Mortuary" in January 2012. In June 2012, Buscombe spoke to "The Brag'" about Pleasure Syndrome saying that while he is satisfied with the album as a piece of work, he is disappointed with its longevity and also revealed that they had problems with their record label, Longtime Listener who distributed it.

== Track listing ==
No.	Title	Length
1.	"The Bounty"	4:39
2.	"Another Worthless Body Sold"	3:17
3.	"Mahoney"	3:26
4.	"Combustion"	3:45
5.	"In the Mortuary"	4:34
6.	"Slow Eyes"	4:24
7.	"Pissing in the Snow"	3:33
8.	"Modelee"	3:24
9.	"Hear Martin"	4:21
10.	"Ashley"	5:28
