= Drowning in the Fountain of Youth =

Drowning In The Fountain of Youth

Studio album by Dan Kelly & The Alpha Males
- Released: 12 August 2006
- Genre: Calypso Pop/Rock
- Length: 55:41
- Label: In-Fidelity

Dan Kelly & The Alpha Males chronology
The Tabloid Blues (2004)	Drowning In The Fountain of Youth (2006)

Drowning in the Fountain of Youth is the second album by Australian act Dan Kelly & The Alpha Males. The album received positive reviews in the local music scene, and was considered for the Album of 2006 by Melbourne street magazine, Inpress. The album provided a single, "Drunk on Election Night"; the track was included by Neil Young in his website's playlist: Living with War - Songs of the Times, in late 2006.

Drowning in the Fountain of Youth peaked at No. 8 on the ARIA Hitseekers Albums Chart and Kelly was nominated for Best Male Artist for the release at the ARIA Music Awards of 2007.

At the J Award of 2006, the album was nominated for Australian Album of the Year.

== Track listing ==
In-Fidelity (SHK INFCD-125)

1. "Safeway Holiday (Get Wise)"
2. "Babysitters of the World Unite"
3. "Drowning in the Fountain of Youth (Plastic Surgery Jam)"
4. "I Will Release Myself (Unto You)"
5. "Fire & Theft (The Landscape Gardners Dream)"
6. "My Brains Are On Fire! (Life Coach Baby)"
7. "Back on the Booze Again"
8. "Mail Order Bride"
9. "Drunk On Election Night"
10. "The Lonely Coconut"
11. "Vice City Rolling"
12. "Star of the Sea"

== Personnel ==
- Dan Kelly – Guitar, vocals, Bass, keyboards, Glockenspiel
- A. Ron Cupples - Guitar, Recorder
- Dan Luscombe - Keyboards, Vocals
- Lewis Boyes - Bass, Vocals
- Christian Strybosch – drums, Vocals
