= J Award of 2006 =

Annual Australian music awards

- Date: December 2006
- Venue: Australia
- Website: abc.net.au/triplej

The J Award of 2006 is the second annual J Awards, established by the Australian Broadcasting Corporation's youth-focused radio station Triple J. The announcement comes at the culmination of Ausmusic Month (November). For the second and final year, there was only one category, Australian Album of the Year.

== Who's eligible? ==
Any Australian album released independently or through a record company, or sent to Triple J in consideration for airplay, is eligible for the J Award. The 2006 nominations were selected from albums received by triple j between December 2005 and November 2006.

== The criteria ==
The J Award is for an album of outstanding achievement as an Australian musical work of art - for its creativity, innovation, musicianship and contribution to Australian music. Fifteen nominations were announced throughout the year.

== Award ==
Australian Album of the Year

Artist	Album Title	Result
Hilltop Hoods	The Hard Road	Won
Augie March	Moo, You Bloody Choir	Nominated
The Living End	State of Emergency	Nominated
Gotye	Like Drawing Blood	Nominated
The Grates	Gravity Won't Get You High	Nominated
The Sleepy Jackson	Personality - One Was a Spider, One Was a Bird	Nominated
Dan Kelly & the Alpha Males	Drowning in the Fountain of Youth	Nominated
Bob Evans	Suburban Songbook	Nominated
Macromantics	Moments in Movement	Nominated
Sarah Blasko	What The Sea Wants, The Sea Will Have	Nominated
SubAudible Hum	In Time for Spring, On Came The Snow	Nominated
Blue King Brown	Stand Up	Nominated
