= Romy Hoffman =

- Also known as: Romy
- Born: Romy Hoffman; 1980 (age 45–46); Sydney, New South Wales, Australia
- Origin: Melbourne, Victoria, Australia
- Genres: Hip hop; punk rock; house
- Occupations: Singer; songwriter; rapper
- Instruments: Vocals; guitar; synthesiser
- Years active: 1995–present
- Labels: Kill Rock Stars; House of Silk
- Member of: Agender
- Formerly of: Noise Addict; Macromantics

Romy Hoffman (born 1980) is an Australian singer, songwriter and rapper who has performed under the names Macromantics, Romy and Agender. Initially based in Sydney, since 2014 she has worked in Los Angeles.

== Life and career ==
Romy Hoffman was raised in a Jewish household. In 1995 as a 15-year-old she started playing guitar with her high school classmate Ben Lee's pop, punk band Noise Addict. With the group, she toured the United States where she encountered the New York-based hip hop culture. She told Tim Colman of The Sydney Morning Herald, "I just did the last tour with them, which was great because I got to go to America." While a member of Noise Addict she was recorded for the track, "Spritz", which is the B-side of their single, "The Frail Girl" (1995).

She later returned to the US, to spend time writing, in San Francisco. As a result, she released her debut solo seven-track extended play, Hyperbolic Logic, in 2004. Colman observed, "It's a challenging listen, with Hoffman spitting tight, at times confronting, rhymes over dark, uneasy and engaging beats... The listening effort unearths a poetic and abstract wordsmith sharing personal experiences and insights." AllMusic's Heather Phares noticed, "[the EP], which introduced her passionate and often witty MC style."

2006 also saw Hoffman become the first hip-hop act (and only the second Australian act) to be signed to the US record label, Kill Rock Stars (home to The Gossip, Deerhoof, Sleater Kinney and Bikini Kill). She released her first full-length album, Moments in Movement, in September 2006 created in collaboration with local producer Tony Buchen. The album was nominated for the 2006 J Award.

2007 saw Macromantics undertaking a national tour and supporting Lily Allen's tour of Australia.

In 2010, after two years of extensive touring, Romy began work on a dark electro pop record. The single "Sleep" was released in 2010 with remixes by DFA's The Juan Maclean and Brain Children. In 2011 she embarked on a U.S with JD Samson's group MEN. In 2011 she worked on another record as ROMY. This time, a house inspired record. In 2012/2013, the single "Elixir" was released on prestigious house label Nervous Records. The follow-up "Home" came out on the chic underground cult label 100% Silk.

Hoffman has always maintained her punk roots. In 2011 she made a "schitzo synthy paranoid punk" lo-fi solo record as AGENDER. She played all the instruments on the record. In 2013 AGENDER morphed into an all girl 3 piece, known for their intense, fast, tight knit punk shows. The band's record Fixations was released on French label Desire Records. The band toured the U.S in June/July 2014.

== Discography ==
=== Albums ===
| Title | Album details |
|---|---|
| Heart Over Mind Over Matter | Released: 2002; Label: Macromantics; Formats: CD |
| Hyperbolic Logic | Released: 2004; Label: Macromantics; Formats: CD |
| Moments in Movement | Released: 2006; Label: Remote Control, Inertia (MACROCD001); Formats: CD |
| Self (En)Titled(as Agender) | Released: 2011; Label: Agender; Formats: DD |
| Fixations(as Agender) | Released: 2014; Label: Desire Records (dsr105LP); Formats: DD, LP |

=== Singles ===
- "Four Facets" b/w "Conspiracy Remix" (2005)
- "Sleep" (2010) (as Romy)
- "Home" (2012) (as Romy)
- "Elixir" (2012) (as Romy)
- "Mani Pedi" (2013) (as Agender)

== Awards and nominations ==
=== AIR Awards ===
The Australian Independent Record Awards (commonly known informally as AIR Awards) is an annual awards night to recognise, promote and celebrate the success of Australia's Independent Music sector.

| Year | Nominee / work | Award | Result |
|---|---|---|---|
| 2007 | Macromantics | Most Oustsanding New Independent Artist | Nominated |

=== J Award ===
The J Awards are an annual series of Australian music awards that were established by the Australian Broadcasting Corporation's youth-focused radio station Triple J. They commenced in 2005.

| Year | Nominee / work | Award | Result |
|---|---|---|---|
| 2006 | Moments in Movement | Australian Album of the Year | Nominated |
