= Leisure Panic! =

Studio album by Dan Kelly
- Released: 9 October 2015
- Recorded: 2014–2015
- Genre: Australian rock
- Length: 50:21
- Label: ABC/Universal
- Producers: Aaron Cupples; Dan Kelly

Dan Kelly chronology
Dan Kelly's Dream (2010)	Leisure Panic! (2015)

Leisure Panic! is a solo album by Australian rock musician, Dan Kelly. It was released in October 2015 through ABC Music/Universal Music Australia. Kelly recorded it over two years in East London, Northern New South Wales, Melbourne and Sydney with members of the Dan Kelly Dream Band. It was produced by Kelly and, long-term collaborator, Aaron Cupples.

Leisure Panic! peaked at No. 10 on the ARIA Hitseekers Albums Chart. It provided two singles, "Never Stop the Rot" (2015) and "Everything's Amazing" (2016). The album was met with critical acclaim, culminating in its nomination for the 2015 AMP award for best Australian album.

== Track listing ==
All lyrics and music composed by Dan Kelly, except where noted.

1. "On the Run (Part 2)" (music by Kelly and Kiernan Box)
2. "Hydra Ferry"
3. "Haters"
4. "Creme de la Creme de la Creme"
5. "Never Stop the Rot" (music by Kelly and Indra Adams)
6. "National Park and Wildlife"
7. "Baby Bonus"
8. "Melbourne vs Sydney"
9. "Gold Coast Man"
10. "Ex Bandido"
11. "Everything's Amazing" (music by Kelly and Aaron Cupples)
12. "Jet Lag"

== Personnel ==
Dan Kelly Dream Band

- Dan Kelly – vocals, electric and acoustic guitars, percussion, piano, occasional bass, drum machine, wurlitzer, synthesizer
- Indra Adams – bass
- Dave Williams – drums, congas
- Madeleine Kelly and Memphis Kelly – backing vocals
- Aaron Cupples – bass, drum programming, glockenspiel
- Joe Cope – Farfisa organ, Mellotron, keyboards

Additional musicians

- Dale Packard – synthesizer, saxophone
- Ryan Nelson – guitar
- Adam Affif – double bass
- Bree Van Reyk – kick drum and party noises
