= Secret Rituals =

Studio album by The Grates
- Released: 17 June 2011 (Australia)
- Recorded: 2010/2011
- Venue: Brooklyn, New York
- Genre: Indie pop/Indie rock
- Length: 39:06
- Label: Dew Process
- Producer: Gus van Go

The Grates chronology
Teeth Lost, Hearts Won (2008)	Secret Rituals (2011)	Dream Team (2014)

Professional ratings
Review scores
Source	Rating
Rolling Stone	4.5/5 stars

Secret Rituals is the third studio album from Brisbane indie pop duo The Grates. It is their first album to be recorded as a duo, with longtime drummer Alana Skyring having left the band to pursue a culinary career.

The first song to be released to radio as a single was "Turn Me On", which was first played on Triple J on 29 April 2011.

The band made the entire album available to stream via their website along with accompanying videos that were made for each track which were shot and edited by The Grates themselves.

== Track listing ==
No.	Title	Length
1.	"Turn Me On"	3:26
2.	"Sweet Dreams"	4:03
3.	"Like You Could Have It All"	2:59
4.	"Change"	4:08
5.	"Crying All Night"	3:02
6.	"Welcome to the Middle"	3:44
7.	"The Night Won't Start Without Us"	3:16
8.	"Young Pricks"	2:41
9.	"Borrowed Skin"	4:16
10.	"With You"	3:14
11.	"Moving On"	4:17
Total length:		39:06

== Charts ==
Chart (2011)	Peak position
Australian Albums (ARIA)	11
