= Moments in Movement =

Studio album by Macromantics
- Released: 2006
- Genre: Australian hip hop
- Length: 46:53
- Labels: Remote Control Records; Inertia Distribution
- Producers: Buchman, Joker 70, Yoko Solo, Tekromantik

Professional ratings
Review scores
Source	Rating
The Age	(favorable)
Allmusic	3.5/5 stars
Cleveland Scene	(favorable)
Dusted Magazine	(favorable)
PopMatters	6/10 stars
The Sydney Morning Herald	(favorable)
XLR8R	(favorable)

Moments in Movement is the first studio album by Australian hip hop artist Macromantics. Originally released in 2006, it was re-released on Kill Rock Stars in 2007.

At the J Award of 2006, the album was nominated for Australian Album of the Year.

== Track listing ==
No.	Title	Producer	Length
1.	"Miss Macro"	Buchman	4:18
2.	"Moments in Movement"	Buchman	3:14
3.	"Scorch"	Buchman	3:20
4.	"Dark Side of Dallas" (featuring Ground Components)	Buchman	4:20
5.	"Eerily Spookily"	Buchman	4:03
6.	"Locksmith" (featuring Sage Francis)	Joker 70	4:13
7.	"Bandwagon"	Buchman	4:14
8.	"Love Thyself"	Buchman	4:04
9.	"Apple Crumble"	Buchman	4:13
10.	"Vaudeville"	Yoko Solo	3:40
11.	"Generation"	Tekromantik	7:09
