= EG Awards of 2007 =

Annual Australian music awards ceremony

- Date: November 2007
- Venue: Prince of Wales, Melbourne, Victoria

The EG Awards of 2007 are the second Annual The Age EG (Entertainment Guide) Awards and took place at the Prince of Wales in November 2007.

== Hall of Fame inductees ==
Kim Salmon

The Age music writer Patrick Donovan said Salmon's sound extended beyond Australia, influencing the likes of Nirvana and Mudhoney. Donovan said "There's an argument … that grunge was actually invented in Australia by garage bands like The Scientists, the Cosmic Psychos and the Lime Spiders, Kim has spent much of his career confounding people as he experimented and evolved. We are the better for it."

== Award nominees and winners ==
Winners indicated below in boldface

Best Album	Best Song
**Silverchair - Young Modern**; The Devastations - Yes, U	**Silverchair - "Straight Lines"'**
Best Male	Best Female
**Gotye**	**Missy Higgins**
Best Band	Best Tour
**Augie March**	**Nick Cave & Grinderman - Forum Theatre**
