= Blackchords =

Australian alternative rock band

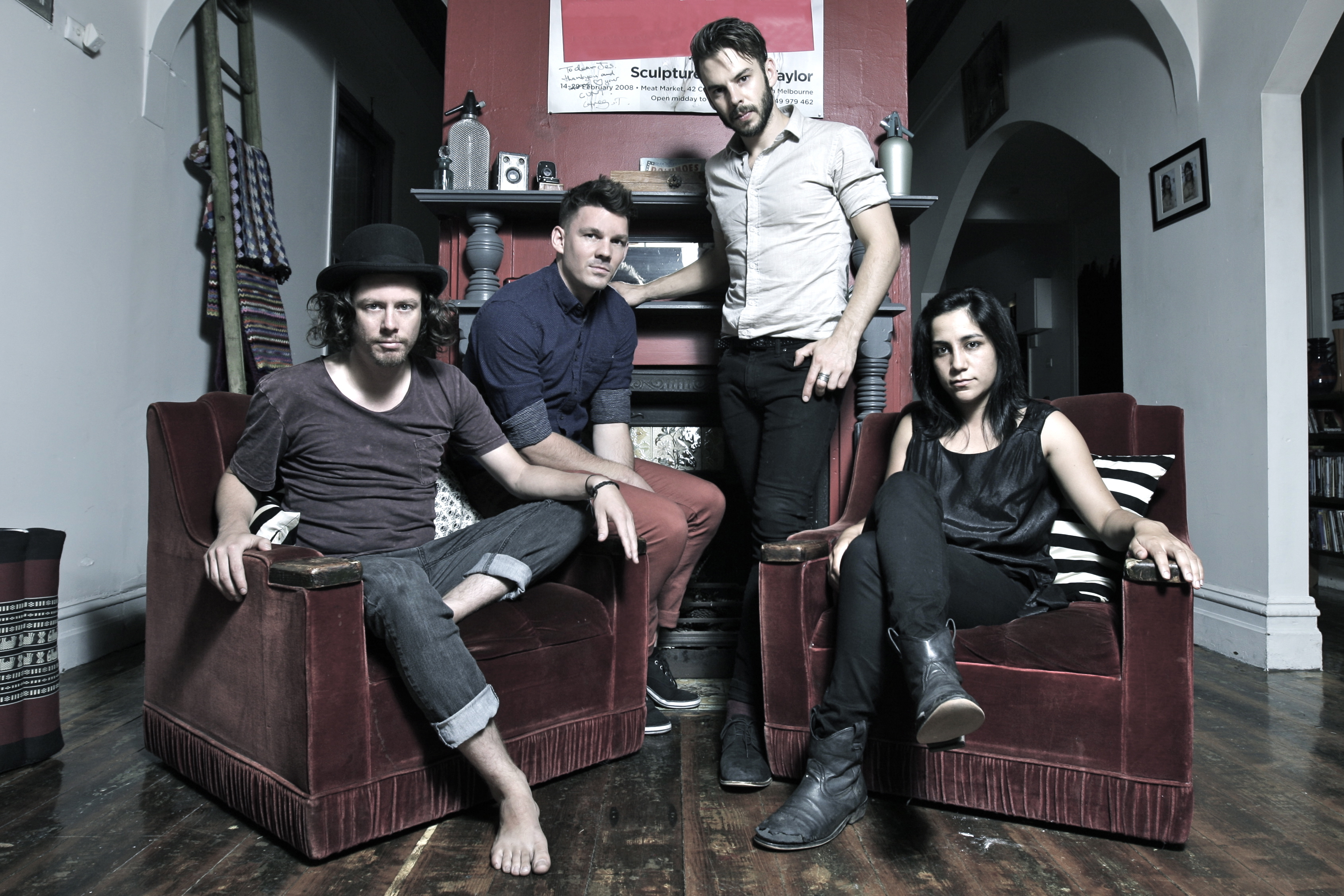
- Blackchords 2013

Background information
- Origin: Melbourne, Australia
- Genres: Rock, Alternative rock
- Years active: 2005–present
- Label: Independent
- Members: Nick Milwright; Damain Cazaly; Guy Kable; Tristan Courtney
- Past members: Sarah Galdes; Jay Tilley; Pete Spark; Nicholas Cheek; Manny Bourakis

Blackchords are an alternative rock band from Melbourne, Australia, consisting of Nick Milwright (vox, guitar & keys), Damian Cazaly (lead guitar), Tristan Courtney (bass)and Guy Kable (guitar)

== History ==
Blackchords were formed as an indie rock band in early 2005 by lead singer Nick Milwright and lead guitarist Damian Cazaly. Milwright's music career began at high school in Eltham, where he learned classical guitar. After finishing school, Milwright aged 17, left to pursue a career in the military. but after becoming disheartened with the armed services, Milwright changed paths completely, deciding to pursue a career in ballet. He was accepted in the Victorian College of the Arts, with a promising career in dance, before an accident in which he tore ligaments in his knee put him in hospital. Aged 20, Milwright headed to London for an eight-month sojourn. Late at night, he would climb onto the roof of his shared flat with his acoustic guitar and write songs – this was the start of his love of songwriting. Returning to Melbourne, he realised he was completely taken by music. In late 2004 Milwright met guitarist Damian Cazaly and the band was formed a few months later.

Blackchords first came to prominence in 2006 when, as an unsigned band, their video for "Broken Bones" won first place at Melbourne's St Kilda Film Festival, SoundKILDA completion beating a host of established artists. In 2009, the same song went on to become a double finalist in the International Songwriting Competition, for best rock song and video. It was also nominated for the 2011 St Helier, Online Music Awards in the Best Video category.

=== Debut album ===
Their debut, self-titled album Blackchords, was produced by ex-Blindside & The Earthmen guitarist Nick Batterham and was released via Australian indie record label Dust Devil Music on 24 April 2009. The album was widely acclaimed in both Australia and the UK from the likes of Rolling Stone Magazine, Clash Magazine, CMU Daily and Australian music magazine Reverb, who described the album as "one of the best Australian debut releases." The first single "At World's End" was named Track Of The Day by QTheMusic.com, chosen as Record Of The Day, by Record Of The Day UK, and 'Track Of The Week' by Alex Baker on Kerrang Radio. In the UK, the band visited Kerrang's studio to record an acoustic session and interview. Further sessions followed for Michelle Zenner at Salford City Radio and viral music channel Balcony TV. The video was also added to the NME TV and MTV video playlists in the UK.

==== Album tour ====
In 2009 after the album launch at the Esplanade Hotel (Melbourne) the band embarked on an Australian East-coast tour and then onto the UK playing shows in London and Paris. The band toured the UK for the second time in 2010 in support of their second single "Pretty Little Thing" and appeared at The Great Escape Festival and Liverpool Sound City music festivals, alongside a host of other new Australian artists including Hungry Kids of Hungary, Dappled Cities & Bluejuice, as part of the Aussie BBQ shows.

In October 2010, Blackchords played at the One Movement Festival in Perth and were personally invited by Ian Haug, the guitarist from Powderfinger to support Powderfinger at their last ever Melbourne show at the Sidney Myer Music Bowl alongside Jet. Kicking off 2011, the band played at the Australian Open Men's Finals in January.

=== A Thin Line ===
Working independently and with limited funds, Blackchords took to crowd and fan funding website Pozible to raise the money for the recording and thankfully, their fans were keen to help and thus raised half of the recording costs for the album. In January 2012, Blackchords, under the guidance of sound engineer Mark Stanley of Red Room Studios, started the long process of recording their second studio album. Recording took place in a country shed transformed into a recording studio in regional Victoria. After recording some demos, Stanley recruited Mercury Prize nominated and Grammy winning producer/mixer, David Odlum (former guitarist with Irish band The Frames, producer- The Frames, Gemma Hayes, Luka Bloom, Josh Ritter among others) With Odlum guiding the band to produce a thoroughly international sounding album. The second album A Thin Line was released in April 2013 by ABC Music, distributed through Universal.

A Thin Line adds more synth sounds to the broody pop they've become synonymous with. The album deals with darker themes of loss and confusion, while still providing contrast with songs of a higher energy. The theme of the album revolves around fighting everyday distraction and endeavouring to follow a narrow path ("a thin line") to your ambitions. Renee Jones of Themusic.com.au says of the album: "By keeping on a thin line and avoiding distraction, the band have created a 10-track release that ironically distracts you from your own life and takes you to a different world."

==== Track listing ====
- "A Thin Line"
- "Oh No"
- "As Night Falls"
- "Sleepwalker"
- "Into The Unknown"
- "Dance, Dance, Dance"
- "Kitchen"
- "From Here"
- "Wasting My Time"
- "Until The Day I Die"

==== Album tour ====
On 28 January 2013, a benefit concert was held for the 2013 Tasmanian bushfires relief at The Tote Hotel. The line-up included Blackchords, Witch Hats, Monique Brumby, Tom Lyngcoln (The Nation Blue), Mike Noga (The Drones), Andy Hazel (Paradise Motel) with former AFL stars Brendon and Michael Gale and Matthew Richardson assisting with BBQ cooking duties. Over $5,500 was raised for The Red Cross Appeal.

March 2013 saw Blackchords tour North America and Canada playing SXSW in Austin, Texas followed by shows in LA, Houston and New York. The band then headed to Canadian Music Week where they played shows in Toronto and Hamilton.

==== Single releases ====
The first single "Dance, Dance, Dance" was released on 21 May 2012. The track was given away as a free download from their BandCamp page. The single is a double a-side, backed by a re-recorded version of "As Night Falls", originally written for the 2010 Australian feature film Blame. The song was performed at The Workers Club in Fitzroy Melbourne, followed by a tour playing shows in Tasmania, Sydney, Adelaide and Brisbane, also playing Victorian regional shows with The Medics. The music video for "Dance, Dance, Dance" was filmed during recording at The Barra Shed in the Yarra Valley and provides a behind-the-scenes look at the band during the recording process.

The second single "Oh No" was released in February 2013 at the Ding Dong Lounge in Melbourne. The accompanying music video was produced and directed by acclaimed cinematographers Tov Belling and Katie Milwright. The clip features dancers choreographed by Stephanie Lake.

== Media and sync ==
=== Movie soundtracks ===
In 2010, Blackchords were asked by film producer Michael Ormond Robinson to contribute a song to the soundtrack to the Australian film Blame. Blame premiered at The Melbourne International Film Festival and was released nationally in June 2011. Despite no formal release plans for the single in the UK, the track "As Night Falls" was added to the daytime schedule of National DAB new music station Amazing Radio and ended up climbing to number two on their chart, the highest ever position for an Australian artist. The single "Pretty Little Thing" was included on the soundtrack to US movie Janie Jones.

=== TV sync ===
Music from their albums has been featured in:

- Netflix show Orange Is the New Black (track: "Into the Unknown")
- MTV shows Teen Wolf (track: "Into the Unknown") and Teen Mom 2
- CBS police drama series Flashpoint
- Nine Network crime drama Underbelly: Razor episode 9 and on the soundtrack (track: "Broken Bones")
- Nine Network's Rescue Special Ops
  - series 3 episode 9 (track: "These Lights")
  - series 3 episode 18 (track: "Disappear")
  - series 3 episode 22 (track: "Sinking Like Stone")
- Cops L.A.C. (track: "Sinking Like Stone")
- NBC's Being Human series 2 episode 7 (track: "Sinking Like Stone")
- Network Ten show Offspring series 3 episode 10 (track: "Broken Bones")
- CTV Television Network's The Listener (track: "These Lights")
- USA Television Network's Suits season 5 episode 3 (track: "Into the Unknown")

== Members ==
=== Current ===
- Nick Milwright (Vox, guitar & keys)
- Damian Cazaly (Lead guitar)
- Sarah Galdes (Drums)
- Tristan Courtney (Bass)

=== Former ===
- Jay Tilley (Bass)
- Pete Spark (Drums)
- Nicholas Cheek (Drums)
- Manny Bourakis (Drums)

== Discography ==
=== Albums ===
- Blackchords – 2009, Australia and UK release
- A Thin Line – 2013, Australia ABC Music
- Connected // Forgotten – 2023

=== Singles ===
- "Broken Bones" – 2008
- "At Worlds End" – 2009
- "Pretty Little Thing" – 2010
- "As Night Falls" – 2010 (from feature film Blame)
- "Dance, Dance, Dance" – 26 May 2012
- "Oh No" – February 2013
- "Through the Window" – 2 December 2022
