= Witch Hats =

Australian rock band

- Origin: Melbourne, Victoria, Australia
- Genres: Alternative rock, post-punk revival
- Years active: 2004–present
- Labels: In-Fidelity Recordings; New York Night Train; Z-Man Records; Longtime Listener; Behind the Beat
- Members: Kris Buscombe; Ash Buscombe; Robert Wrigley; Matt Cox
- Past members: Duncan Blachford; Tom Barry
- Website: Witch Hats bandcamp

Witch Hats are an Australian rock band formed in Melbourne in 2004.

== History ==
=== Formation and Wound of a Little Horse (2004–2007) ===
The band was formed in late 2004 by guitarist and vocalist Kris Buscombe with drummer Duncan Blachford, who moved to Melbourne from Tasmania to start a band. Shortly after a self-titled demo CD was released, Buscombe recruited his younger brother Ash to play bass. By the time the group was prepared to release their first EP, Wound of a Little Horse produced by Phill Calvert (The Birthday Party) on In-Fidelity Recordings in 2006, Tom Barry had also joined the line-up. A 7-inch single, "Before I Weigh" was released in November 2007 as a teaser for their upcoming debut, Cellulite Soul.

=== Cellulite Soul and US Tour (2008) ===
Again working with Phill Calvert, Cellulite Soul was released in March 2008. Shortly after, the band embarked on a US tour with The Drones. While in the US, they released the single "Hellhole" on the New York indie label New York Night Train. They filmed the video clip for their song, "Check the Center" in a desert in Arizona and recorded new material for Solarium Down the Causeway in Oakland, California. Their cover of The Breeders' song "The She" was released on the compilation album Gigantic: A Tribute To Kim Deal (American Laundromat Records).

=== Solarium Down the Causeway Era (2009–2010) ===
Upon returning to Australia, the group released a second EP, Solarium Down the Causeway in 2009. They were invited to play at the Meredith Music Festival after the US indie rock group Crocodiles cancelled their Australian tour. The band contributed their song "Hellhole" to the soundtrack of Sean Byrne's Australian horror film The Loved Ones. In 2009 Blachford left the group and was replaced by Matt Cox.

=== Pleasure Syndrome (2011–2013) ===
In August 2011 Witch Hats released a video clip for a new song, "Hear Martin" (view here). They also announced an October release for their sophomore LP, entitled Pleasure Syndrome, produced by US-born producer/engineer Casey Rice (Dirty Three, Tortoise). Guitarist Tom Barry left the group shortly after the recording sessions of Pleasure Syndrome and was quickly replaced by Robert Wrigley.

On 28 January 2013, a benefit concert was held for the 2013 Tasmanian bushfires relief at The Tote Hotel. The lineup included Witch Hats, the Blackchords, Monique Brumby, Tom Lyngcoln (The Nation Blue), Mike Noga (The Drones), Andy Hazel (Paradise Motel) with former AFL stars Brendon and Michael Gale and Matthew Richardson assisting with BBQ cooking duties. Over $5,500 was raised for The Red Cross Appeal.

Witch Hats toured Asia for the first time in November 2013, visiting China, Hong Kong, Taiwan and South Korea. A free collected works CD, A China Selection containing three new songs was given to patrons at shows. In an interview with the online publication Shanghai 247, vocalist and primary songwriter Kris Buscombe discussed recording the band's third album, which he intends on sound engineering himself.

=== Deliverance (2016) ===
Witch Hats released their third full-length album 'Deliverance' in July 2016. The album garnered a 4 star review by Guardian writer Andrew Stafford who praised its "intense blasts of modern Australia as dystopian nightmare". Deliverance marked the band's first entirely self-recorded and produced record and was released on Phill Calvert's Behind the Beat Records label. Deliverance features 8 songs including the self-titled track Deliverance and the nine-minute Strange Life.

== Discography ==
=== Albums ===
- Cellulite Soul - In-Fidelity Recordings (2008)
- Pleasure Syndrome - Longtime Listener (2011)
- A China Selection - Independent, (2013)
- Deliverance - Behind the Beat, (2016)

=== Compilations ===
- The She, appeared on Gigantic: A Tribute To Kim Deal - American Laundromat Records (2008)
- Hellhole, appeared on The Loved Ones OST - Shock Records (2009)

=== Demos ===
- Witch Hats - Independent (2005)

=== EPs ===
- Wound of a Little Horse - In-Fidelity Recordings (2006)
- Solarium Down the Causeway - Z-Man Records/Sony/ATV (2009)

=== Singles ===
- Jock the Untold - In-Fidelity Recordings (2006)
- Before I Weigh - In-Fidelity Recordings (2008)
- Hellhole - New York Night Train (2008)
- Check the Center - Z-Man Records/Sony/ATV (2009)
- Hear Martin - Longtime Listener (2011)
- In the Mortuary - Longtime Listener (2012)
- Deliverance - Behind the Beat (2016)
- Strange Life - Behind the Beat (2016)
