= Teeth Lost, Hearts Won =

Studio album by the Grates
- Released: 2 August 2008
- Genre: Indie pop/Indie rock
- Length: 35:58
- Label: Dew Process
- Producer: Peter Katis

The Grates chronology
Gravity Won't Get You High (2006)	Teeth Lost, Hearts Won (2008)	Secret Rituals (2011)

Teeth Lost, Hearts Won is the second studio album from Brisbane indie pop trio the Grates. The album debuted and peaked at number six on the ARIA Charts.

At the J Awards of 2008, the album was nominated for Australian Album of the Year. The first single, "Burn Bridges", was released on 5 July 2008. "Call of the Wild" was available as an MP3 download from their website as of July 2008. The second single from the album was "Aw Yeah", released 1 November 2008.

== Reception ==
Professional ratings
Review scores
Source	Rating
AllMusic	3.5/5 stars

Patience Hodgson described the experience of the second album as a "really insular experience" compared to the "just for fun" experience of Gravity Won't Get You High. "We weren't playing live; we were sitting at home writing an album."

== Track listing ==
1. "Burn Bridges"
2. "Carve Your Name"
3. "The Fun in Every Start"
4. "Two Kinds of Right"
5. "Aw Yeah"
6. "Milk Eyes"
7. "The Sum of Every Part"
8. "Storms and Fevers"
9. "Earthquake"
10. "Not Today"
11. "When You're Scared of Dogs"
12. "Let It Die"
13. "The Biggest and Longest Adventure Ever"

== Charts ==
Chart (2008)	Peak position
Australian Albums (ARIA)	6
