= The Grates =

Australian indie rock band

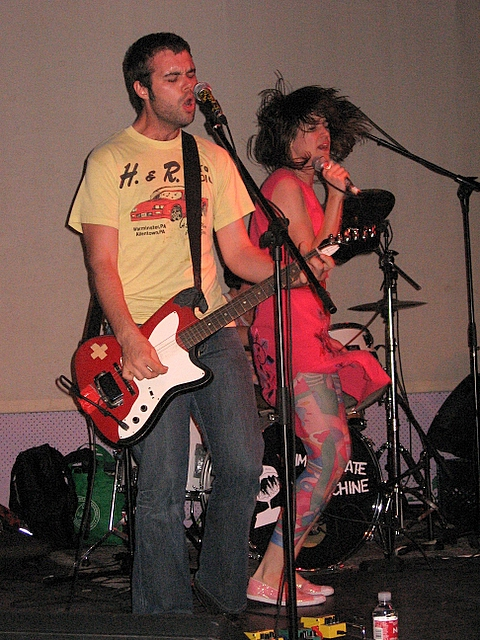
- John Patterson (left) and Patience Hodgson, Alana Skyring is obscured, Montreal, June 2006

Background information
- Origin: Brisbane, Queensland, Australia
- Genres: Indie rock, alternative rock, pop rock
- Years active: 2002–2020
- Labels: Dew Process, Death Valley
- Past members: Patience Hodgson; John Patterson; Alana Skyring
- Website: thegrates.com

The Grates were an Australian indie rock band, which formed in Brisbane, Queensland in 2002 with Patience Hodgson on lead vocals, John Patterson on guitars and backing vocals and Alana Skyring on drums. Their first two albums, Gravity Won't Get You High (2006) and Teeth Lost, Hearts Won (2008), both reached the ARIA Albums Chart top 10. The third studio album, Secret Rituals (2011), peaked at No. 11. Their highest charting singles "Science Is Golden" (2006) and "Burn Bridges" (2008) reached the ARIA top 100. A video album, Til Death Do Us Party: Live at the Forum (2007), peaked in the ARIA Top 40 Music DVDs chart. Hodgson and Patterson married in November 2012 and were proprietors of Southside Tea Room in Morningside from 2012 to 2019. The Grates disbanded in 2020.

== History ==
=== 2002–2004: Formation and "Trampoline" ===
The Grates were formed in 2002 in Brisbane by Patience Hodgson on lead vocals, John Patterson on guitars and backing vocals and Alana Skyring on drums. Patterson and Skyring had attended Alexandra Hills State High School. In 1999, they met Cleveland District State High School student, Hodgson, in year 12 at a drama class, which all three attended at the local TAFE to avoid physical education classes. Hodgson discovered her singing voice at a karaoke bar, where she performed "A Whole New World" (from Aladdin). According to Patterson the rendition "was less than stellar". The three were watching rage in 2002 when they decided to form a group. They independently released a limited number of a six-track extended play, The Grates in that year. After several rehearsals Hodgson, with her then-boyfriend, travelled to Scotland for a year where they planned a two-piece band, Prix Divers. Hodgson, Patterson and Skyring kept in contact and swapped ideas for songs. Patterson and Skyring each played in bands, Zombie Crime Boss and Clifton, as well as forming short-lived groups together or with others.

Once back in Australia Hodgson rejoined Patterson and Skyring to rehearse in Patterson's garden shed. Patterson described their band roles, "[Hodgson] couldn't play an instrument, so she was the singer. I was bored of playing keyboards so I started playing guitar, and [Skyring] just drums however she wants." They deliberately chose not to have a regular bass guitarist, according to Craig Mathieson of The Age this indicates "they've shown a disdain for convention." They performed under a different name each night – they might trick regular customers into thinking they were a new band instead of the same "shitty" one. During 2003 they independently issued three more EPs Crocodile, four-track Black Dog Black Dog and Pyrate Kids.

In January 2004 they first performed as the Grates at Ric's bar, Brisbane. Subsequent noise restrictions limited live performances at that venue, Patterson recalled "It's pathetic. Ric's is our favourite place to play in Brisbane... We played our first couple of shows there about a year ago and miss playing there terribly." According to Australian music journalist, Ed Nimmervoll, "They name the Pixies and Weezer as influences." Whereas Tammy la Gorce of AllMusic opined their early material were "Ramones and Yeah Yeah Yeahs-influenced songs." Musicologist Ian McFarlane added X-Ray Spex as another influence, whereas the group create "one hell of a racket with their... blasts of indie punk rock."

Later in 2004 they sent a rough demo of "Trampoline" to national youth radio station, Triple J, which was accompanied by a hand-written biography and press release. It was co-written by Hodgson, Patterson and Skyring. They used an 8-track recorder with two cheap microphones in Patterson's shed. The track received high rotation on Triple J. Mathieson described it as "a kinetic pop mantra where Hodgson skewers alternative rock's predilection for sultry female vocalists." "Trampoline" was used for a Just Jeans "Shortcuts" TV ad.

During 2004 they supported tours by Rocket Science, the Tremors, TISM and then Regurgitator. They were signed to Dew Process in 2004 and released a four-track extended play, The Ouch. The Touch. (February 2005). Kathryn Kernohan of FasterLouder felt it was "a perfect taster... you couldn't ask for a stronger selection of tracks. It gives an indication of how good you'd be live, and it leaves me hanging out for an album." The Ouch. The Touch peaked in the top 100 on the ARIA Singles Chart.

=== 2005–2007: Gravity Won't Get You High ===
In April 2005 Hodgson explained her song writing style, "My attitude used to be just make up some shit that fits in and we'll be sweet, but now I want to work on the lyrics... I think when Daniel Johns first got some success, he didn't really know about music history, so he studied it, but I don't feel like I need to know. I just pick up stuff as we go along."

In 2005, the band appeared at the Big Day Out, Meredith, Splendour in the Grass, Falls Festival and Homebake. They supported the Go! Team on their tour over late 2005 to early 2006.

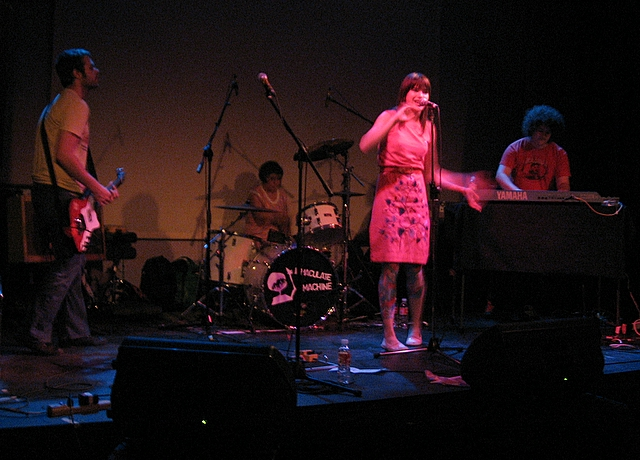
The Grates, performing at Main Hall, Montreal in June 2006. (L to R): Patterson, Skyring, Hodgson, Dan Condon.

In April 2006, the band released their debut album, Gravity Won't Get You High, which peaked at No. 9 on the ARIA Albums Chart. It was recorded in Chicago with Brian Deck (Holopaw, Iron and Wine, Josh Ritter) producing. Nimmervoll noticed that "Some songs had been with them for a long time, others were wtitten just days before going into the studio." It was released in the UK and the United States in June. Nate Dorr of PopMatters opined that it provided "an infectious variety... At times, there's a sense of catchy frivolity to the proceedings, but it can easily be forgiven... sheer excitement of hearing such unbridled enthusiasm in an emerging talent. And they are talented." Pitchfork's Sean Fennessey felt "electric Hodgson, who sounds like she's riding a jet-fueled pogo on almost every song, is joined by guitarist John Patterson and drummer Alana Skyring, who make a sweet, playful style of basement band music."

The lead single, "19 20 20", was released in March 2006. It was followed by "Science Is Golden", which was released in September 2006 and reached the ARIA Singles Chart top 60. The third single, "Rock Boys", was issued later that year. Four of the album's tracks were listed in the Triple J Hottest 100, 2006: "Lies are Much More Fun" (No. 71), "Inside Outside" (No. 42), "Science is Golden" (No. 17) and "19 20 20" (No. 10). During 2006 they performed at the Big Day Out (Australian leg), headlined a national tour in the first half of the year, supported Sleater-Kinney on their Australian tour, supported the Zutons on their UK tour, supported the Young Knives, and then Arctic Monkeys in their tours of Australia.

On 13 October 2006 they performed at the Forum Theatre, Melbourne, which was issued as a live DVD, Til Death Do Us Party, on 30 April 2007. Mess+Noise's Ben described how Hodgson's "a genuine livewire, swanning across the stage in a flouncy white dress, all red-cordial energy and child-like abandon. But her voice, in a live setting, is a tuneless thing. The harmonies and the melodies of the recording just aren't there." He felt that Patterson's guitar work is "bare too, skipping between clangy clean sounds and high-school-band distortion" while Skyring's "drums are solid, in the Meg White style, but she still looks like the whole thing – her, being here, behind these drums, and all those people, out there, pogoing – is a surprise."

=== 2008–2011: Teeth Lost, Hearts Won & Secret Rituals ===
The Grates' second album, Teeth Lost, Hearts Won, was released on 2 August 2008, which peaked at No. 6. According to the Dwarf.com website's reviewer it "needs good set of speakers and an appropriate setting to really be appreciated. When you have seen a band like this live, the expectation is that they will try and capture some of that vibe – and for some reason – unless this sucker is played loud, the vibe is totally lost." Its lead single, "Burn Bridges", was released in July 2008, which reached the top 100. It was followed by "Aw Yeah" (October 2008). The Grates were listed onto the Triple J Hottest 100, 2008 with three tracks: "Burn Bridges" (No. 34), "Aw Yeah" (No. 80) and "Carve Your Name" (No. 83).

In mid-2009 the Grates travelled to New York where they performed and continued song writing for six months. Skyring left the band in 2010 to study a baking course at Institute of Culinary Education, New York; initially the Grates continued as a two-piece with Hodgson and Patterson writing tracks together in that city.

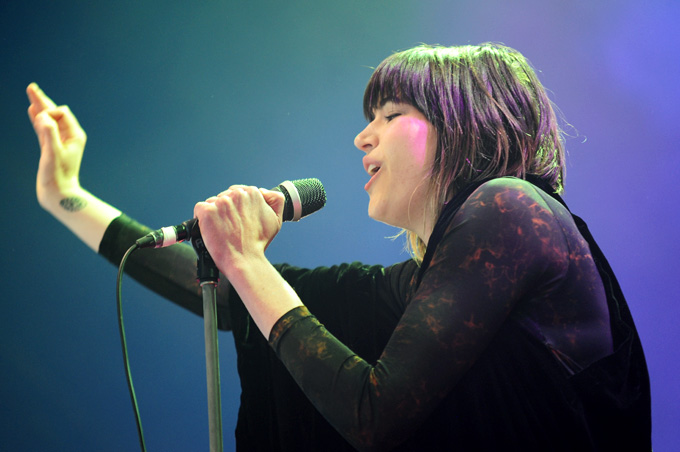
Hodgson fronting the band at a performance in Perth (July 2011)

Local US musician, Ben Marshall, joined the band on drums in New York to finish recording their third album, Secret Rituals (17 June 2011), which peaked at No. 11. Matt Shea of Mess+Noise felt it was "a little like a ledger of artistic assets: for the band to come out on top, the final statement needs to show a positive balance of improved songwriting over receding whacked-out style." The Alphabet Pony's reviewer found the work had "benefited from this increased sensibility, and the time taken to marinate in the creative hub of Brooklyn has done wonders for their revitalised sound... It's classic Grates sound, brought kicking and screaming into 2011 – but it's in the conflict between the old stuff and the new stuff that's the killer." Marshall toured with the band in Australia in June to July on the Secret Rituals tour with auxiliary member, Miranda Freeman on bass guitar and keyboards. Freeman is Hodgson's former high school mate.

The Grates premiered its lead single, "Turn Me On", on Triple J in April 2011 and it was streamed on their official Facebook page. Marshall was also on their Summer's Breath tour later that year in October and November. On the Triple J Hottest 100 of 2011, "Turn Me On" was listed at No. 54.

=== 2012–2020: Dream Team and final years ===
Marshall left the Grates in 2012 due to commitments back in the US. The Grates took a hiatus from live shows soon after, to focus on the opening their cafe, bar Southside Tea Room. Their new drummer, Ritchie Daniell, who drummed for Brisbane indie rock band The Trouble with Templeton and currently Hatchie, officially joined The Grates in 2013 to play their live shows.

In December 2014, The Grates released their fourth studio album, Dream Team, on their own label, Death Valley. Everett True of The Guardian described how it "sounds more 'grown up' – what with the hyper-energetic brat-pop Grates of old switched for something a little more refined, more radio-friendly – there are still enough moments of euphoria to lift it above the mundane." He was disappointed by its "solid, muscly bloke drumming... Not everything has to be treated like it's an anthem." It did not reach the ARIA top 100, although it appeared on the ARIA Digital Albums top 50 and debuted at #48 on the Australian iTunes chart.

At the 2015 Queensland Music Awards, the band won Best Rock Artist for their song "Holiday Home".

In 2018, Skyring officially rejoined the band. They went on tour that year to commemorate the 10-year anniversary of Teeth Lost, Hearts Won.

The Grates played their final shows as part of the 2020 Hotter Than Hell festival alongside Everclear, Unwritten Law and Frenzal Rhomb.

=== Other projects ===
Skyring joined Neil and Sharon Finn's group, Pajama Club in May 2011, for live performances. That group had recorded their self-titled album, which appeared in September 2011. Skyring, as a member of Pajama Club, completed a tour of UK and US. In May 2012 Hodgson and Patterson opened Southside Tea Room, a bar and cafe, located at Morningside. It received positive reviews and hosted various events: markets, gigs, and craft tutorials. Daniell initially worked as a barista at the cafe. Southside Tea Room closed in 2019. Hodgson and Patterson had been dating for several years before marrying in November 2012. As of 2019, the couple have two children. Hodgson and Patterson separated in 2020.

== Members ==
- Patience Hodgson – lead vocals (2002–2020)
- John Patterson – guitar, backing vocals, keyboards (2002–2020)
- Alana Skyring – drums (2002–2010, 2018–2020)
- Ritchie Daniell – drums (2013–2018)

Touring members

- Conan Thorogood – keyboards (2005–2006)
- Dan Condon – keyboards (2006–2009)
- Ty Jontz – keyboards (2009–2010)
- Miranda Freeman – bass guitar, keyboards (2011)
- Ben Marshall – drums (2011–2013)
- Jack Richardson – guitar <(2015–2016)
- Owen Penglis – bass guitar (2015–2016)
- Daniel Hanson – drums (2020)

== Discography ==
=== Albums ===
Title	Details	Peak chart positions	Certifications
Title	Details	AUS	Certifications
Gravity Won't Get You High	Released: 8 April 2006; Label: Dew Process (DEW90172)	9	ARIA: Gold
Teeth Lost, Hearts Won	Released: 2 August 2008; Label: Dew Process (DEW9000069)	6	
Secret Rituals	Released: 2011; Label: Dew Process (DEW9000339)	11	
Dream Team	Released: December 2014; Label: Death Valley (CCO000922)	–	

=== Extended plays ===
Title	Details	Peak chart positions
Title	Details	AUS
The Grates	Released: 2003; Label: The Grates; Home recording, only 20 copies pressed	–
Crocodile	Released: 2003; Label: The Grates	–
Black Dog Black Dog	Released: 2003; Label: The Grates	–
Pyrate Kids	Released: 2003; Label: The Grates	–
The Ouch. The Touch.	Released: 2004; Label: Dew Process (DEW90152)	77
The Versions Suicide (with Whyte Fang)	Released: 2011; Label: Dew Process	–

=== Singles ===
Title	Year	Chart Positions	Album
Title	Year	AUS	Album
"Trampoline"	2004	—	The Ouch. The Touch
"Nightstick"	2004	—	
"Sukkafish"	2005	—	The Ouch. The Touch
"19-20-20"	2006	—	Gravity Won't Get You High''
"Science Is Golden"	2006	52	Gravity Won't Get You High''
"Rock Boys"	2006	—	Gravity Won't Get You High''
"Burn Bridges"	2008	61	Teeth Lost, Hearts Won.
"Aw Yeah"	2008	—	Teeth Lost, Hearts Won.
"Turn Me On"	2011	—	Secret Rituals
"Sweet Dreams"	2011	—	Secret Rituals
"Buffalo River"	2011	—	non-album single
"Holiday Home"	2014	—	Dream Team
"Call Me"	2015	—	Dream Team

=== DVDs ===
List of DVDs with Australian chart positions
Title	Album details	Peak chart positions
Title	Album details	AUS
Til Death Do Us Party: Live at the Forum	Released: April 2007; Format: DVD; Label: Dew Process	31

== Awards and nominations ==
=== AIR Awards ===
The Australian Independent Record Awards (commonly known informally as AIR Awards) is an annual awards night to recognise, promote and celebrate the success of Australia's Independent Music sector.

Year	Nominee / work	Award	Result
2006	The Ouch. The Touch.	Best Performing Independent Single / EP	Nominated

=== APRA Awards ===
The APRA Awards are presented annually from 1982 by the Australasian Performing Right Association (APRA), "honouring composers and songwriters". They commenced in 1982.

Year	Nominee / work	Award	Result	Ref.
2012	"Turn Me On" (Patience Hodgson / John Patterson)	Song of the Year	Shortlisted	

=== ARIA Music Awards ===
The ARIA Music Awards is an annual awards ceremony that recognises excellence, innovation, and achievement across all genres of Australian music. The Grates have been nominated for three awards.

Year	Nominee / work	Award	Result
2006	Gravity Won't Get You High	Breakthrough Artist – Album	Nominated
2006	Gravity Won't Get You High	Best Cover Art	Nominated
2007	Til Death Do Us Party	Best Music DVD	Nominated

=== Australian Music Prize ===
The Australian Music Prize is an annual award of $30,000 given to an Australian band or solo artist in recognition of the merit of an album released during the year of award.

Year	Nominee / work	Award	Result
2006	Gravity Won't Get You High	Album of the Year	Nominated

=== J Award ===
The J Award is an award given by Australian youth radio station Triple J to Australian Album of the Year. It is judged by the music and on-air teams at triple j, Unearthed and Double J.

Year	Nominee / work	Award	Result
2006	Gravity Won't Get You High	Australian Album of the Year	Nominated
2008	Teeth Lost, Hearts Won	Australian Album of the Year	Nominated

=== Queensland Music Awards ===
The Queensland Music Awards (previously known as Q Song Awards) are annual awards celebrating Queensland, Australia's brightest emerging artists and established legends. They commenced in 2006.

Year	Nominee / work	Award	Result (wins only)
2007	"Science is Golden"	Published song of the Year	Won
2012	themselves	The Courier-Mail People's Choice Award Most Popular Group	Won
2015	"Holiday Home"	Rock Song of the Year	Won
