= Gravity Won't Get You High =

Studio album by the Grates
- Released: 8 April 2006
- Genres: Indie pop, indie rock
- Length: 40:02
- Label: Dew Process
- Producer: Brian Deck

The Grates chronology
| The Ouch. The Touch. (2004) | Gravity Won't Get You High (2006) | Teeth Lost, Hearts Won (2008) |

Singles from Gravity Won't Get You High
- 1. "19-20-20" Released: 2006; 2. "Science Is Golden" Released: 2006; 3. "Rock Boys" Released: 2006

Professional ratings
Review scores
| Source | Rating |
|---|---|
| AllMusic | 3/5 stars |
| Music Box | 2/5 stars |
| PopMatters | 8/10 |
| Pitchfork Media | 5.9/10 |

Gravity Won't Get You High is the debut studio album of Australian indie rock band the Grates. It was produced by Brian Deck, and features studio produced versions of songs from their EP The Ouch. The Touch. Notable differences are the usage of banjo and fiddle in "Sukkafish".

At the ARIA Music Awards of 2006 the album was nominated for two awards; Breakthrough Artist - Album and Best Cover Art. At the J Award of 2006, the album was nominated for Australian Album of the Year. The album was also nominated for the 2006 Australian Music Prize.

Four songs from the album made it into the 2006 Triple J Hottest 100 -- "Lies Are Much More Fun" at #71, "Inside Outside" at #42, "Science Is Golden" at #17 and "19 20 20" at #10.

== Track listing ==
1. "I Won't Survive" – 1:05
2. "Lies Are Much More Fun" – 3:53
3. "19 20 20" – 2:05
4. "Rock Boys" – 2:36
5. "Howl" – 2:54
6. "Trampoline" – 2:06
7. "Science Is Golden" – 2:58
8. "Feels Like Pain" – 2:58
9. "Nothing Sir" – 3:00
10. "Inside Outside" – 2:41
11. "Sukkafish" – 3:57
12. "Seek Me" – 2:15
13. "Little People" – 3:24
14. "I am Siam" – 4:21
15. "Small Lives" (European version only) - 6:24 (Silence until 3:00)

== Charts ==
| Chart (2006–08) | Peak position |
|---|---|
| Australian Albums (ARIA) | 9 |

== Certification ==
| Region | Certification | Certified units/sales |
|---|---|---|
| Australia (ARIA) | Gold | 35,000^{^} |
^{^} Shipments figures based on certification alone.
