= The Ouch. The Touch. =

The Ouch, The Touch

EP by The Grates
- Released: February 2005
- Genre: Indie pop/Indie rock
- Length: 10:20
- Label: Interscope / Universal Records (USA)
- Producer: Johnathan Burnsid

The Grates chronology
The Ouch, The Touch (2005)	Gravity Won't Get You High (2006)

The Ouch. The Touch. is an extended play EP released by The Grates in 2005. It contains alternate versions of "Sukkafish" and "Trampoline" to the one released with their debut album, Gravity Won't Get You High.

== Track listing ==
1. "Message" – 1:54
2. "Sukkafish" – 4:00
3. "Wash Me" – 2:11
4. "Trampoline" – 2:04
