= SubAudible Hum =

Indie rock band based in Australia

- Origin: Melbourne, Victoria, Australia
- Genres: Indie rock, progressive rock
- Years active: 1999–present
- Labels: Low Transit Industries
- Members: Daniel Griffith; Ryan Nelson; Zane Lynd; Nick Van Cuylenburg; Joel Griffith
- Past members: Simon Edwards

SubAudible Hum are an Australian indie rock band based in Melbourne. Often compared to Radiohead they are active on the live circuit, particularly in their home town, they have released three albums, one of which was nominated for the J Award; In Time for Spring, On Came the Snow. and have received national airplay on Triple J.

== History ==
Front man Daniel Griffith moved from Brisbane to Melbourne in 1999. Starting as an idea in 1999 he started put together a band called SubAudible Hum. The line-up consolidated around 2003 and in 2005 saw the release of their debut album; Everything You Heard Is True. Quickly following was their second album; In Time For Spring, On Came The Snow, which was met with critical acclaim. Tall Stories, their third album, was released in 2009.

== Discography ==
=== Studio albums ===
Title	Details
Everything You Heard Is True	Released: 2005; Label: Low Transit Industries (LTID017); Format: CD
In Time For Spring, On Came The Snow	Released: October 2006; Label: Low Transit Industries (LTID044); Format: CD
Tall Stories	Released: October 2009; Label: Low Transit Industries (LTID084); Format: CD, DD

=== EPs ===
Title	Details
Subaudible Hum	Released: 2000; Label: Subaudible Hum; Format: CD
American Gods	Released: 2002; Label: Subaudible Hum; Format: CD
Shake Like The Wind	Released: 2003; Label: Subaudible Hum; Format: CD
All for the Caspian	Released: 2006; Label: Low Transit Industries (LTID043); Format: CD

== Awards and nominations ==
=== J Award ===
The J Awards are an annual series of Australian music awards that were established by the Australian Broadcasting Corporation's youth-focused radio station Triple J. They commenced in 2005.

Year	Nominee / work	Award	Result
2006	In Time for Spring, On Came The Snow	Australian Album of the Year	Nominated
