= The Devastations =

Australian indie rock band from Melbourne

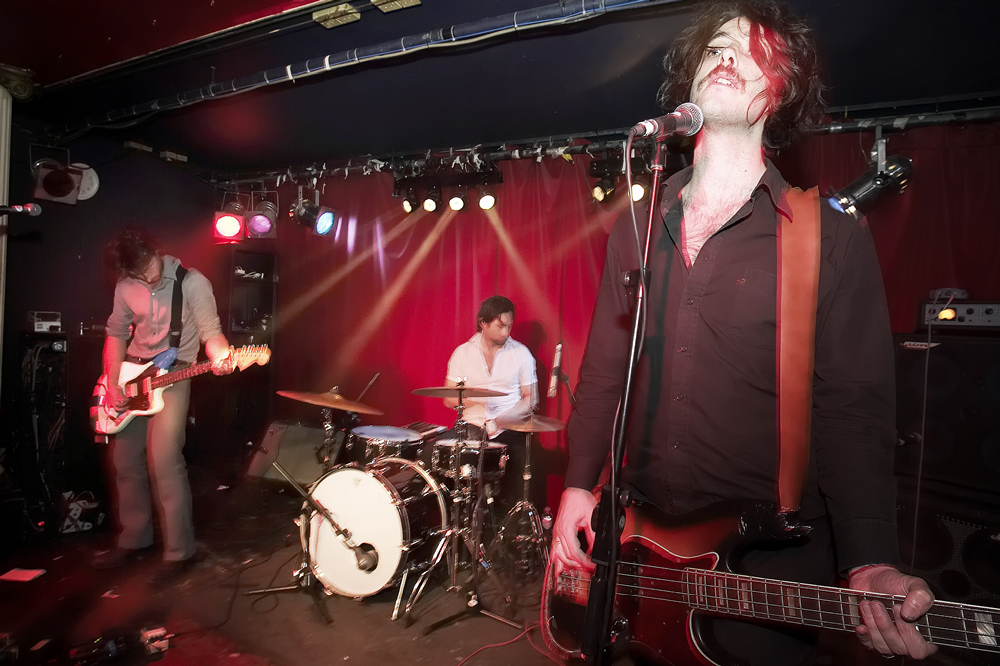
- Devastations at The Water Rats, Kings Cross, London, UK. September, 2007.

Background information
- Origin: Melbourne, Australia
- Genre: Indie rock
- Years active: 2002–2010
- Labels: Spooky/MGM, Beggars Banquet
- Members: Conrad Standish; Tom Carlyon; Hugo Cran
- Website: The Devastations on Bandcamp

Devastations were an indie rock band from Melbourne, Australia, comprising Conrad Standish, Tom Carlyon, and Hugo Cran, whose former band was Luxedo. They were active from 2002 to 2010.

== Band history ==
The band was founded in 2002 by Tom Carlyon, Hugo Cran, and Conrad Standish after the end of their former band Luxedo. Originally called The Devastations to mimic the style of bands such as The Temptations, "The" was later dropped.

On 5 May 2003 the band released their self-titled debut album. In 2004, the band was signed to Beggars Banquet Records for the European release. Their self-titled debut album was named by Rolling Stone Germany as the best debut of 2004.

On 19 September 2005, the band released their second studio album, Coal. The album was nominated for the 2005 Australian Music Prize.

On 17 September 2007, the band released their third studio album, Yes, U. The album was also nominated for The Australian Music Prize. Yes, U, was also nominated for Best Album at the EG Awards of 2007.

Patrick Donovan from the Age said "Yes, U is a dark, sexy and at times claustrophobic record. By using an 808 drum machine and recording with Hate Rock keyboardist Adam Yang, they move into more electronic territory that recalls the avant garde works of Yoko Ono (her ethereal song "Walking on Thin Ice" was a reference point for the band's "Black Ice"), Grace Jones, Suicide, David Bowie and Scott Walker." Carlyon said "With [Yes U], we wanted to move away from the traditional song structure and focus more on sounds, and just see where the songs took us, We didn't want to be in control of the process. We wanted to make a different album to Coal. Anyone can write a song. We were more interested in the sounds. The drum machine opened up a world of possibilities."

In 2008, Devastations recorded a cover of the Cure's 1981 song "All Cats Are Grey" for Perfect as Cats: A Tribute to the Cure, a charity record released in October 2008 by Los Angeles indie label Manimal Vinyl.

In 2009, Devastations collaborated with New York City-based band Blonde Redhead to record "When the Road Runs Out" for the AIDS benefit album Dark Was the Night produced by the Red Hot Organization.

By 2010, Devastations had disbanded.

== Personnel ==
- Tom Carlyon – guitar, piano
- Hugo Cran – drums
- Conrad Standish – vocals, bass

=== Tom Carlyon ===
Around 2003–4, Carlyon also played with Dan Kelly and the Alpha Males, led by Dan Kelly.

Carlyon and Standish later reunited as an electronic music duo, Standish/Carlyon, releasing the album Deleted Scenes in 2013.

Carlyon later formed a musical duo called Time for Dreams with Amanda Roff (who had worked with Harmony and The Drones), after meeting through mutual friend Dan Kelly. They released their debut album In Time in 2017, and dropped their first track, "You’ve Got a Friend" in May 2018. Liz Campbell of Happy Mag described their sound as having a "signature moody tone, cosmic texture and reverb-drenched sound", while Vicky Hebbs called their music "evocative, sophisticated and deeply sensual pop music with a post-punk twist". The duo were nominated for the 2018 Corner Live Music Award, and played at Meredith Music Festival in December 2018. Their album In Time was longlisted for the Australian Music Prize as well as selected by radio stations 3RRR and PBS 106.7FM as Album of the Week.

== Reception ==
The band's solemn lamentations often earned comparisons to artists such as Nick Cave and Tindersticks.

== Awards and nominations ==
The Australian Music Prize (the AMP) is an annual award of $30,000 given to an Australian band or solo artist in recognition of the merit of an album released during the year of award. The commenced in 2005.

Year	Nominee / work	Award	Result
2005	Coal	Australian Music Prize	Nominated
2007	Yes U	Australian Music Prize	Nominated

The Music Victoria Awards (previously known as The Age EG Awards and The Age Music Victoria Awards) are an annual awards night celebrating Victorian music. They commenced in 2005.

Year	Nominee / work	Award	Result
EG Awards of 2007	Yes, U	Best Album	Nominated

== Discography ==
=== Studio albums ===
Title	Details
The Devastations	Released: 5 May 2003; Label: Spooky Records (Spooky008); Format: CD
Coal	Released: 19 September 2005; Label: In-Fidelity (INFCD-120); Format: CD, DD
Yes, U	Released: 17 September 2007; Label: Beggars Banquet, Remote Control (BBQCD 255); Format: CD, DD, LP
