= Dan Kelly (musician) =

Australian musician

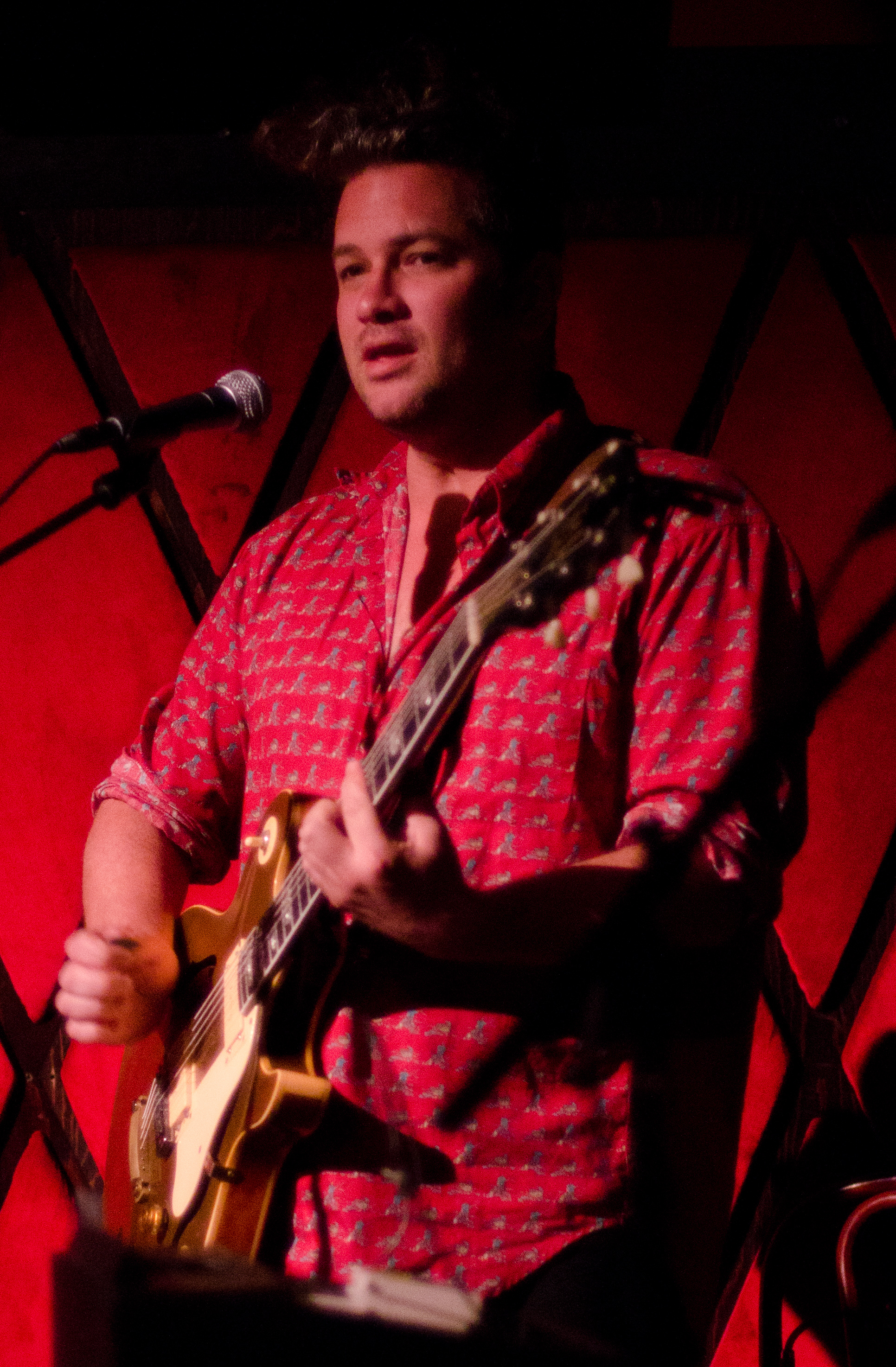
- Dan Kelly performing in New York City in September 2011

Background information
- Born: Daniel Kelly
- Origin: Adelaide, South Australia
- Genre: Australian rock
- Occupations: Musician, singer-songwriter, guitarist
- Instruments: Vocals, guitar
- Years active: 2003–present
- Labels: ABC Music, In-Fidelity, Shock

Daniel Kelly is an Australian singer-songwriter and guitarist. He has released music as part of Dan Kelly and the Alpha Males. His uncle is well-known Australian musician Paul Kelly.

== Early life and education ==
Daniel Kelly was born in South Australia, the son of Martin, a teacher, and a nurse, the second oldest of six children. He grew up on a small farm in Ormeau, a hinterland town of the Gold Coast in Queensland. He attended a Catholic school in Beenleigh. Both parents played the guitar, and Dan learnt play the instrument at 13. His uncle is musician Paul Kelly.

He studied environmental science at Griffith University in Brisbane.

== Career ==
=== Early career ===
Kelly formed his first band, Nord, in Brisbane before moving to Melbourne in 1996.

In 1996 he lived St Kilda with his aunt and uncle, musician Paul Kelly, and worked as a dishwasher, then kitchen-hand, and then cook. He played in various bands during this period, and started writing his own songs in around 2000.

=== 2000–2003: first solo recordings & Man O Mercy ===
In 2000 he started playing solo shows under the name Dank Alley, not wanting to trade on his famous uncle Paul Kelly]'s name.

In 2002 he released his first solo EP, Man O Mercy. The single from the EP, "Countermeal Kim", about "female law officers falling in love with criminals and breaking them out of jail" became a hit on Triple J.

=== 2004–2008: Dan Kelly and the Alpha Males and other bands ===
In 2004 he formed a new band, Dan Kelly and the Alpha Males, with Gareth Liddiard & Christian Strybosch of (The Drones) and Tom Carlyon (The Devastations). They were best known for Kelly's Australian slacker-esque guitar sounds, his falsetto vocals and vivid lyrics. The Alpha Males appeared at The Falls Festival in Melbourne and Tasmania and selected Big Day Outs. In March 2004 they released their debut album, Sing the Tabloid Blues, on In-Fidelity Recordings.

At the ARIA Music Awards of 2004, Kelly was nominated for ARIA Award for Best Male Artist, with the band receiving two ARIA nominations: for Best Adult Contemporary Album and for Breakthrough Artist-Album.

Kelly said "The songs were basically taken from jokes said around the kitchen table and they all referenced my flatmates. We were slightly mad back then. The songs are still pretty gag-heavy but we didn't want the album to be a joke. I didn't want to be a joke writer, a comedy writer, that's a whole different world – I didn't want to hang out with comedians the rest of my life." He performed in his uncle's band, Paul Kelly and the Boon Companions, recording on the 2004 album, Ways & Means.

In 2005, Liddiard and Carlyon travelled to Europe with their respective other projects, with Aaron Cupples, Dan Luscombe and Lewis Boyes joining the Alpha Males. The band then released an EP, Pirate Radio, in October 2005, which saw Kelly receive his second nomination for ARIA Award for Best Male Artist at the ARIA Music Awards of 2006.

The band gained significant press coverage in mid-2006 with their single "Drunk on Election Night" – a reflection on the disillusionment many experienced during the evening of the 2004 Australian federal election. The song was hand picked by Neil Young to be included in his Living With War Songs of The Times.

Their second album, Drowning in the Fountain of Youth, released in August 2006, was awarded Album of the Year by Melbourne-based music magazine Inpress. Kelly received his third nomination for ARIA Award for Best Male Artist at the ARIA Music Awards of 2007. The album was also short-listed for the 2006 J Award.

In early 2007, Kelly announced his backing band, the Alpha Males, were to disband for an undecided amount of time to allow the individual members to focus on other projects, a pertinent example being the addition of Dan Luscombe to the line up of The Drones. Kelly again joined his uncle, performing on his 2007 album, Stolen Apples and subsequent national tour, and has often returned to his touring band since.

Kelly also played in Stardust Five, a five-piece surf rock and pop band formed in Melbourne in 2005. Other members of the band were Paul Kelly, Dan Luscombe, Peter Luscombe, and Bill MacDonald.

In 2008 Kelly teamed up with Melbourne faux Hawaiian duo, The Ukeladies, to release "The S.U.V Song", undertaking a number of headline shows and support shows with Augie March, in October and November 2008.

=== 2009–2014 : Dan Kelly's Dream Band ===
In late 2009 Kelly commenced work on a new album, Dan Kelly's Dream. The first single, "Bindi Irwin Apocalypse Jam", was released in April 2010. Kelly undertook a national tour with a new line up called Dan Kelly's Dream Band comprising Dave Williams & Kiernan Box (Augie March), Indra Adams (Ground Components) and Ryan Nelson (SubAudible Hum). Dallas Packard (Ground Components) and Kelly's teenage cousins Madeleine and Memphis Kelly (daughters of Paul Kelly) also featured on the album, with the girls frequently joining the touring band on stage to provide backing vocals.

Dan Kelly’s Dream made a number of best album of the year lists, notably Faster Louder, Mess and Noise and The Age. At the EG Awards of 2010, Kelly won the award for Best Male artist and was nominated for Best Male Artist at the ARIA Music Awards of 2010. Dan Kelly’s Dream was nominated for the 2010 AMP award for best Australian album.

=== 2015–present: Leisure Panic! ===
In October 2015, Kelly released Leisure Panic! on ABC Music. The album was recorded over two years in East London, Northern New South Wales, Melbourne and Sydney with members of the Dream Band and long time collaborator Aaron Cupples. The album spawned the singles "Never Stop the Rot" and "Everything's Amazing". It was met with critical acclaim culminating in its nomination for the 2015 AMP award for best Australian album.

In 2016, Kelly embarked on the 'Australian Dreamers' national tour with Alex Gow (Oh Mercy), with both artists taking the stage together.

In 2019, Kelly celebrated 15 years of Sing the Tabloid Blues by performing the album in Australia.

== Discography ==
=== Albums ===
Title	Details	Peak chart positions
Title	Details	AUS
Sing the Tabloid Blues (as Dan Kelly and the Alpha Males)	Released: 15 March 2004; Label: In-Fidelity Recordings (IF009CD); Format: CD, digital download	—
Drowning in the Fountain of Youth (as Dan Kelly and the Alpha Males)	Released: 12 August 2006; Label: In-Fidelity Recordings (INFCD-125); Format: CD, digital download	—
Dan Kelly's Dream	Released: 16 July 2010; Label: Dan Kelly, Shock Records (DK003); Format: CD, digital download	100
Leisure Panic!	Released: 9 October 2015; Label: ABC Music, UMA (4749804); Format: CD, digital download, streaming, LP	—
Goldfeels	Released: 5 September 2024; Label: Dan Kelly (DANK001V); Format: CD, digital download, streaming, LP	—

=== Extended plays ===
Title	Details
Man-O-Mercy EP	Released: 2002; Label: In-Fidelity Recordings (IF002CD); Format: CD
Pirate Radio (as Dan Kelly and the Alpha Males)	Released: October 2005; Label: In-Fidelity Recordings (INFCD-124); Format: DD, CD

== Awards ==
=== AIR Awards ===
The Australian Independent Record Awards (commonly known informally as AIR Awards) is an annual awards night to recognise, promote and celebrate the success of Australia's Independent Music sector. They commenced in 2006.

Year	Nominee / work	Award	Result
2010	himself	Best Independent Artist	Nominated
2010	Dan Kelly's Dream	Best Independent Album	Nominated

Year	Nominee / work	Award	Result	Ref.
2026	"Rita Wrote a Letter" (Paul Kelly / Dan Kelly)	Song of the Year	Nominated	

=== ARIA Music Awards ===
The ARIA Music Awards is an annual awards ceremony that recognises excellence, innovation, and achievement across all genres of Australian music. Kelly has been nominated for six awards.

Year	Nominee / work	Award	Result
2004	Sing The Tabloid Blues	Best Male Artist	Nominated
2004	Sing The Tabloid Blues	Breakthrough Artist - Album	Nominated
2004	Sing The Tabloid Blues	Best Independent Release	Nominated
2006	Pirate Radio	Best Male Artist	Nominated
2007	Drowning in the Fountain of Youth	Best Male Artist	Nominated
2010	Dan Kelly's Dream	Best Male Artist	Nominated

=== Australian Music Prize ===
The Australian Music Prize (the AMP) is an annual award of $30,000 given to an Australian band or solo artist in recognition of the merit of an album released during the year of award. It commenced in 2005.

Year	Nominee / work	Award	Result
2010	Dan Kelly's Dream	Australian Music Prize	Nominated
2015	Leisure	Australian Music Prize	Nominated

=== EG Awards / Music Victoria Awards ===
The EG Awards (known as Music Victoria Awards since 2013) are an annual awards night celebrating Victorian music. They commenced in 2006.

Year	Nominee / work	Award	Result
2010	himself	Best Male Artist	Won

=== J Award ===
The J Awards are an annual series of Australian music awards that were established by the Australian Broadcasting Corporation's youth-focused radio station Triple J. They commenced in 2005.

Year	Nominee / work	Award	Result
2006	Drowning in the Fountain of Youth	Australian Album of the Year	Nominated
