= Stolen Apples =

Studio album by Paul Kelly
- Released: 7 July 2007
- Recorded: Australia
- Genre: Folk rock
- Length: 41:27
- Label: EMI Music
- Producers: Paul Kelly and The Boon Companions

Paul Kelly chronology
Ways & Means (2004)	Stolen Apples (2007)	Songs from the South Volume 2 (2008)

Stolen Apples is the twenty fifth album by Australian singer-songwriter Paul Kelly and was released in July 2007 on EMI Music. The album was Kelly's first solo album since Ways & Means in 2004, and features religious themes throughout. It peaked at No. 8 on the ARIA Albums Chart.

== Background ==
The song "You're 39, You're Beautiful and You're Mine" was a Kelly song originally written for Tex, Don and Charlie (Tex Perkins, Don Walker and Charlie Owen)

"Tex and I were doing a gig in Melbourne at the Famous Spiegeltent and Paul was playing later on the same day. After our gig, we were standing around and Paul was saying how much he loved the old album. - Owen
"We said, 'Oh yeah, we're doing a new one. You haven't got any songs, have you?' A few days later, he turns up at my house with a little cassette." - Perkins

The song was subsequently included on their 2005 album All is Forgiven.

"Tex sang it beautifully and we had to work to find a way to reclaim the song that didn't just sound like an imitation of their version. We tried it three or four different ways and had almost given up on it until we hit on doing it as a waltz. Now my favourite line in the song is the one where Tex changed the lyric to improve on what I had written." - Kelly

On "The Ballad of Queenie and Rover" Kelly tells the story of acclaimed Aboriginal artists Queenie McKenzie and Rover Thomas, from the Warmun community in the East Kimberley.

"Rover came to painting in later life and Queenie was a stock camp cook for many years before she took up painting and they both rose to prominence. I heard the story about how Queenie saved Rover’s life as a young man when he was kicked in the head by his horse and she sewed him up with needle and thread. When the doctor arrived he said, 'I don’t need to do anything else, it’s been beautifully done.'" - Kelly

== Reception ==
Professional ratings
Review scores
Source	Rating
AllMusic	2/5 stars
Sydney Morning Herald	(favourable)
Rave Magazine	(favourable)
Web Wombat	3/5 stars

== Track listing ==
All tracks written by Paul Kelly unless otherwise indicated.

1. "Feelings of Grief" – 5:55
2. "God Told Me To" – 3:41
3. "Stolen Apples Taste The Sweetest" – 4:16
4. "The Sweetest Thing" – 3:24
5. "You're 39, You're Beautiful and You're Mine" – 3:34
6. "The Lion and The Lamb" (Paul Kelly, Dan Kelly, Dan Luscombe, Peter Luscombe, Bill McDonald) – 3:33
7. "Right Outta My Head" (Paul Kelly, Dan Kelly) – 3:20
8. "Keep on Driving" – 2:13
9. "The Ballad of Queenie and Rover" – 4:10
10. "The Foggy Fields of France" – 4:05
11. "Please Leave Your Light On" – 3:16

== Personnel ==
Credits:

- Paul Kelly – Acoustic guitar, lead vocals, piano on "Please Leave Your Light On"
- Dan Kelly – Electric guitar, banjo, harmony vocals, piano on "The Foggy Fields of France"
- Dan Luscombe – Electric guitar, slide guitar, keyboards, harmony vocals
- Peter Luscombe – Drums, percussion, occasional harmony vocals
- Bill McDonald – Bass, occasional harmony vocals
- Steve Hesketh – Guest keyboardist on "Right Outta My Head"
- Michael Barclay – Harmony vocals on "Keep on Driving"
- Amanda Roff – Harmony and backing vocals on "The Sweetest Thing"
- Sharman Williamson, Eva McDonald, Natalie Camilleri and The Boon Companions – backing vocals on "The Sweetest Thing"
- The Pigram Brothers – Harmony vocals on "The Ballad of Queenie and Rover"
- Ross Irwin – Trumpet and Flugel horn on "The Ballad of Queenie and Rover"

== Credits ==
- Mastered by Ross Cockle
- Mixed by Scott Horscoft and Aaron Cupples
- Engineered by Adam Rhodes
- Art by David Homer

== Stolen Apples Tour ==
For the tour on the back of this album, Paul decided to play the entire album in full and then play a collection of his greatest hits. In an interview with the Sydney Morning Herald, Kelly stated that the idea was inspired by the setlist structure of Neil Young's concert tour supporting the 2003 album Greendale.

=== The Band ===
The band for this tour was:
Paul Kelly – Lead vocals, acoustic guitar, harmonica
Dan Kelly and Dan Luscombe – Electric guitar and harmonies
Peter Luscombe – drums and harmonies
Bill McDonald – Bass guitar and harmonies
Phil Carroll – keyboards

== Charts ==
Chart (2007)	Peak position
Australian Albums (ARIA)	8

== Certifications ==
Region	Certification	Certified units/sales
Australia (ARIA)	Gold	35,000^{^}
^{^} Shipments figures based on certification alone.
