= Z-Man Records =

- Founded: 2009
- Founder: Lou Risdale
- Distributor(s): Fuse Distribution; Sony/ATV
- Genre: Rock, grunge, post-punk
- Country of origin: Australia
- Location: Melbourne
- Official website: www.zmanrecords.com

Z-Man Records is an Australian record label founded in 2009 by Lou Risdale, former event manager of the Meredith Music Festival and Golden Plains Festival.

== Artists ==
The following artists are currently signed to Z-Man Records:

- The Bonniwells
- The Coralinas
- God
- Mark Steiner & His Problems
- Noah Taylor & the Sloppy Boys
- Parading
- Sleepwalks

== Alumni ==
A list of former artists:

- Mother & Father
- Witch Hats

== See also ==
- Lists of record labels
