= In-Fidelity Recordings =

- Founded: 2002
- Founder: Bruce Milne; Steven Stavrakis
- Distributor(s): Inertia Distribution
- Genre: Various
- Country of origin: Australia
- Location: Melbourne, Victoria
- Official website: www.infidelity.com.au

In-Fidelity Recordings is a record label founded in September 2002 by Bruce Milne and Steven Stavrakis.

Milne established the Au Go Go label and Stavrakis was co-founder of Waterfront Records and Fellaheen. Between them they have worked with such Australian acts as Magic Dirt, Spiderbait, Ratcat, the Meanies, the Hardons, the Scientists, Ben Lee, Snout and Eastern Dark. They have also been involved in introducing international acts such as Sonic Youth, Jon Spencer Blues Explosion, Pavement, Dinosaur Jr, Mudhoney and Butthole Surfers to an Australian audience.

The first release on the label was the debut album from the Datsuns on 16 October 2002. The band had been feted by major labels around the world, finally signing a one-album deal with V2 Records in all territories outside Australia and New Zealand where they chose to go with In-Fidelity.

== Artists ==
- Sophie Koh
- The Datsuns
- The Specimens
- The Drones
- Capital City
- The Dirtbombs
- The Cants
- Dan Kelly and the Alpha Males
- The Soundtrack of Our Lives
- The Double Agents
- Witch Hats
- Cheyenne Weeks
- Tobias Cummings
