= Triple J's Hottest 100 of 2016 =

Most popular songs of the year in Australia

2016 Triple J Hottest 100

Countdown details
- Date of countdown: 26 January 2017
- Charity partner: Australian Indigenous Mentoring Experience
- Votes cast: 2,255,110

Countdown highlights
- Winning song: Flume featuring Kai "Never Be like You"
- Most entries: Violent Soho (5 tracks)

Chronology
← Previous; 2015	Next → 2017

The 2016 Triple J Hottest 100 was announced on 26 January 2017. It is the 24th countdown of the most popular songs of the year, as chosen by the listeners of Australian radio station Triple J.

2016's countdown broke several Hottest 100 records, including number of votes (over 2.25 million), number of songs by Australian acts both in the whole list (66 out of the 100) and at its top (all of the top four), and longest absence between countdowns (16 years for Paul Kelly). With the first-place win of Australian producer Flume for "Never Be like You", 2016 marks a record-breaking fourth consecutive annual countdown in which the number-one track was by an Australian act, after Vance Joy in 2013, Chet Faker in 2014, and The Rubens in 2015. Flume became the first electronic dance music producer to top the countdown.

== Background ==
Triple J's Hottest 100 lets members of the public vote online for their top ten songs of the year, with these votes used to identify the year's 100 most popular songs. Any song that premiered between December 2015 and November 2016 was eligible for 2016's Hottest 100. Triple J published a list of 1,909 eligible songs on their 2016 Voting List. Voting commenced on 12 December 2016, as announced by Dr Karl Kruszelnicki in a nature mockumentary depicting a live music event. The short film featured cameo appearances from many musicians, along with Dr Karl doing a shoey.

Several artists and presenters made their Hottest 100 votes public. The artists most often voted for by Triple J presenters were: D.D Dumbo; Kanye West; Julia Jacklin, who was not ultimately featured in the countdown; and A.B. Original, who are vocal critics of Australia Day (in 2016, Triple J announced a review of the countdown's date in response to criticism from the group and others). On 12 December, bookmakers Sportsbet.com.au and William Hill placed Flume's "Never Be like You" as the song most likely to take out first place by a significant margin, with a Sportsbet representative stating that they have "never seen such a short favourite at this stage".

Voting closed on 23 January 2017. By 25 January, the day before the countdown, bookmakers and media reports identified Flume's "Never Be like You" and Amy Shark's "Adore" as the clear frontrunners for first place.

== Full list ==
Note: Australian artists

#	Song	Artist	Country of origin
1	Never Be like You	Flume featuring Kai	Australia/Canada
2	Adore	Amy Shark	Australia
3	Jungle	Tash Sultana	Australia
4	1955	Hilltop Hoods featuring Montaigne and Tom Thum	Australia
5	Redbone	Childish Gambino	United States
6	Believe (Like a Version)	DMA's	Australia
7	Papercuts	Illy featuring Vera Blue	Australia
8	Say It	Flume featuring Tove Lo	Australia/Sweden
9	Stranger	Peking Duk featuring Elliphant	Australia/Sweden
10	Starboy	The Weeknd featuring Daft Punk	Canada/France
11	Chameleon	Pnau	Australia
12	Cocoon	Milky Chance	Germany
13	Lovesick	Mura Masa featuring ASAP Rocky	United Kingdom/United States
14	Viceroy	Violent Soho	Australia
15	Genghis Khan	Miike Snow	Sweden
16	January 26	A.B. Original featuring Dan Sultan	Australia
17	The Opposite of Us	Big Scary	Australia
18	All Night	Chance the Rapper featuring Knox Fortune	United States
19	7	Catfish & the Bottlemen	United Kingdom
20	On Hold	The xx	United Kingdom
21	Death to the Lads	The Smith Street Band	Australia
22	Ultralight Beam	Kanye West	United States
23	Catch 22	Illy featuring Anne-Marie	Australia/United Kingdom
24	Come On Mess Me Up	Cub Sport	Australia
25	Because I Love You	Montaigne	Australia
26	Make Them Wheels Roll	Safia	Australia
27	Drive	Gretta Ray	Australia
28	Frankie Sinatra	The Avalanches	Australia
29	Our Town	Sticky Fingers	Australia
30	Innerbloom (What So Not Remix)	Rüfüs	Australia
31	One Dance	Drake featuring Wizkid and Kyla	Canada/Nigeria/United Kingdom
32	Notion	Tash Sultana	Australia
33	Bullshit	Dune Rats	Australia
34	Scott Green	Dune Rats	Australia
35	World of Our Love	Client Liaison	Australia
36	Sad Songs	Sticky Fingers	Australia
37	Smoke & Retribution	Flume featuring Vince Staples and Kučka	Australia/United States
38	Youth	Glass Animals	United Kingdom
39	Step Up the Morphine	DMA's	Australia
40	Surfin'	Kid Cudi featuring Pharrell	United States
41	I Feel It Coming	The Weeknd featuring Daft Punk	Canada/France
42	Heartlines	Broods	New Zealand
43	Final Song	MØ	Denmark
44	Satan	D.D Dumbo	Australia
45	Dumb Things (Like a Version)	A.B. Original featuring Paul Kelly and Dan Sultan	Australia
46	Dang!	Mac Miller featuring Anderson .Paak	United States
47	Walrus	D.D Dumbo	Australia
48	Creepin'	Kingswood	Australia
49	Higher	Hilltop Hoods featuring James Chatburn	Australia
50	Strange Diseases	Gang of Youths	Australia
51	Outcast at Last	Sticky Fingers	Australia
52	Love Yourself (Like a Version)	Halsey	United States
53	Blanket	Violent Soho	Australia
54	Bored to Death	Blink-182	United States
55	Say a Prayer for Me	Rüfüs	Australia
56	Keeping Score (Like a Version)	Paces featuring Guy Sebastian	Australia
57	Twice	Catfish & the Bottlemen	United Kingdom
58	Girlie Bits	Ali Barter	Australia
59	Solo	Frank Ocean	United States
60	Drinkee	Sofi Tukker	Germany/United States
61	Gamma Knife	King Gizzard & the Lizard Wizard	Australia
62	Marinade	Dope Lemon	Australia
63	Life Itself	Glass Animals	United Kingdom
64	Alaska	Maggie Rogers	United States
65	All Fucked Up	The Amity Affliction	Australia
66	Hold Up	Beyoncé	United States
67	I Bring the Weather with Me	The Amity Affliction	Australia
68	Next to You	L D R U featuring Savoi	Australia
69	So Sentimental	Violent Soho	Australia
70	Wolfie	Golden Features featuring Julia Stone	Australia
71	Free	Broods	New Zealand
72	Famous	Kanye West	United States
73	No Shade	Violent Soho	Australia
74	Lost (Season One)	Camp Cope	Australia
75	Because I'm Me	The Avalanches	Australia
76	This Could Be Heartbreak	The Amity Affliction	Australia
77	Soundcheck	Catfish & the Bottlemen	United Kingdom
78	Settle	Vera Blue	Australia
79	Burn the Witch	Radiohead	United Kingdom
80	Gemini Feed	Banks	United States
81	Panda	Desiigner	United States
82	Think About It	Thundamentals featuring Peta & the Wolves	Australia
83	Simulation	Tkay Maidza	Australia
84	Pink + White	Frank Ocean	United States
85	My Love Is Gone	Safia	Australia
86	Dopamine	Bliss n Eso featuring Thief	Australia
87	Uptown Folks	Dope Lemon	Australia
88	Me and Your Mama	Childish Gambino	United States
89	Over You	Safia	Australia
90	Anything Near Conviction	Luca Brasi	Australia
91	Subways	The Avalanches	Australia
92	How to Taste	Violent Soho	Australia
93	High and Low	Empire of the Sun	Australia
94	Fading	Vallis Alps	Australia
95	Lose It	Flume featuring Vic Mensa	Australia/United States
96	Hanging by a Thread	Elk Road featuring Natalie Foster	Australia
97	You Don't Think You Like People Like Me	Alex Lahey	Australia
98	Season 2 Episode 3	Glass Animals	United Kingdom
99	Too Good	Drake featuring Rihanna	Canada/Barbados
100	Brace	Birds of Tokyo	Australia

=== #101 – #200 List ===
On 29 January 2017, Triple J broadcast the second 100 songs of the countdown.

#	Song	Artist	Country of origin
101	Chlorine	Trophy Eyes	Australia
102	33 "GOD"	Bon Iver	United States
103	People-Vultures	King Gizzard & the Lizard Wizard	Australia
104	No Problem	Chance the Rapper featuring Lil Wayne and 2 Chainz	United States
105	Don Quixote	Drapht featuring Hilltop Hoods	Australia
106	Sides	Allday featuring NYNE	Australia
107	Glowed Up	Kaytranada featuring Anderson .Paak	Canada/Haiti/United States
108	Stop Me (Stop You)	Nick Murphy	Australia
109	One By One	Sticky Fingers	Australia
110	Glad That You're Gone	The Hard Aches	Australia
111	Surprise Yourself	Jack Garratt	United Kingdom
112	The Boys	Lisa Mitchell	Australia
113	Ivy	Frank Ocean	United States
114	Too Soon	DMA's	Australia
115	Till It Kills Me	Montaigne	Australia
116	Real Friends	Kanye West	United States
117	Illuminate	Emma Louise	Australia
118	Life on Mars (Like a Version)	Sarah Blasko	Australia
119	You Don't Get Me High Anymore	Phantogram	United States
120	Bulls	The Cat Empire	Australia
121	SloMo	San Cisco	Australia
122	What If I Go?	Mura Masa featuring Bonzai	United Kingdom/Ireland
123	Welcome to Your Life	Grouplove	United States
124	Off White Limousine	Client Liaison	Australia
125	Just a Lover	Hayden James	Australia
126	Done	Camp Cope	Australia
127	How to Make Gravy (Like a Version)	Luca Brasi	Australia
128	Karate	Babymetal	Japan
129	Rolling Dice	Just a Gent featuring Ella Vos and Joey Chavez	Australia/United States
130	RA	Slumberjack	Australia
131	Man	Skepta	United Kingdom
132	Knife Edge	Matt Corby	Australia
133	Run	Tourist	United Kingdom
134	Brother	D.D Dumbo	Australia
135	Unwind	Gretta Ray	Australia
136	Quality of Life	Hellions	Australia
137	Fall Together	The Temper Trap	Australia
138	Paranoia	A Day to Remember	United States
139	Blood in the Cut	K.Flay	United States
140	Healing	Rudimental featuring J Angel	United Kingdom
141	Nihilist Party Anthem	Ball Park Music	Australia
142	Crave You/The Less I Know the Better (Like a Version)	Elk Road featuring Lisa Mitchell	Australia
143	Whipping Boy	Ball Park Music	Australia
144	Higher	The Naked & Famous	New Zealand
145	Detroit Rock Ciggies	The Bennies	Australia
146	Native Tongue	Gang of Youths	Australia
147	For You	Northeast Party House	Australia
148	Messiah	M-Phazes and Alison Wonderland	Australia
149	Brighter	Rüfüs	Australia
150	Black Beatles	Rae Sremmurd featuring Gucci Mane	United States
151	Freedom	Beyoncé featuring Kendrick Lamar	United States
152	Ultralight Beam (Like a Version)	Cub Sport	Australia
153	Thresher	Hellions	Australia
154	Someone That Loves You	Honne and Izzy Bizu	United Kingdom
155	Blood on My Leather	DZ Deathrays	Australia
156	Leef	Ball Park Music	Australia
157	I Remember	AlunaGeorge	United Kingdom
158	Come Down	Anderson .Paak	United States
159	Lone	What So Not and Ganz featuring Joy	Australia/Netherlands
160	Thick as Thieves	The Temper Trap	Australia
161	Chains (Like a Version)	Matt Corby	Australia
162	Numb & Getting Colder	Flume featuring Kučka	Australia
163	Shelter	Porter Robinson and Madeon	United States/France
164	Colourblind	Hands Like Houses	Australia
165	Standing in the Rain	Action Bronson, Mark Ronson and Dan Auerbach	United States/United Kingdom
166	Lazarus	David Bowie	United Kingdom
167	Waiting	RL Grime, What So Not and Skrillex	Australia/United States
168	Never Say Never	Thundamentals	Australia
169	Jet Fuel Can't Melt Steel Beams	Camp Cope	Australia
170	Spring Has Sprung	Skegss	Australia
171	Be With You	Rüfüs	Australia
172	2 Black 2 Strong	A.B. Original	Australia
173	Dog Years	Maggie Rogers	United States
174	Refuge	Northlane and In Hearts Wake	Australia
175	Sooth Lady Wine	Matt Corby	Australia
176	Fake Love	Drake	Canada
177	Angel	Sticky Fingers	Australia
178	Stranger Things Theme	Luke Million	Australia
179	Breathe Life (Like a Version)	Vera Blue	Australia
180	Flight 101	Sticky Fingers	Australia
181	Westway	Sticky Fingers	Australia
182	DVP	PUP	Canada
183	Something Strange	Sticky Fingers featuring Remi	Australia
184	A Night out With	Hockey Dad	Australia
185	Mob Rule	Bad Dreems	Australia
186	For Good	Remi featuring Sampa the Great	Australia/Zambia
187	Devil's Calling	Parkway Drive	Australia
188	Goosebumps	Travis Scott featuring Kendrick Lamar	United States
189	Sorry	Beyoncé	United States
190	I Need a Forest Fire	James Blake featuring Bon Iver	United Kingdom/United States
191	Boss	Disclosure	United Kingdom
192	Conqueror	Aurora	Norway
193	Take a Chance	Flume featuring Little Dragon	Australia/Sweden
194	I Thought We Knew Each Other	British India	Australia
195	Alarm	Anne-Marie	United Kingdom
196	What You Mean to Me	Montaigne	Australia
197	Couldn't Believe	Broods	New Zealand
198	Same Drugs	Chance the Rapper	United States
199	Easier	Mansionair	Australia
200	Aubrey	Running Touch featuring Ira Horace	Australia

== Statistics ==
=== Artists with multiple entries ===
#	Artist	Tracks
5	Violent Soho	14, 53, 69, 73, 92
4	Flume	1, 8, 37, 95
3	Catfish and the Bottlemen	19, 57, 77
3	Safia	26, 85, 89
3	The Avalanches	28, 75, 91
3	Sticky Fingers	29, 36, 51
3	Glass Animals	38, 63, 98
3	The Amity Affliction	65, 67, 76
2	Tash Sultana	3, 32
2	Hilltop Hoods	4, 49
2	Montaigne (Note: Once solo (25), and once with Hilltop Hoods (4))	4, 25
2	Childish Gambino	5, 88
2	DMA's	6, 39
2	Illy	7, 23
2	Vera Blue (Note: Once solo (78), and once with Illy (7))	7, 78
2	The Weeknd	10, 41
2	Daft Punk (Note: Twice with The Weeknd (10, 41))	10, 41
2	Nick Littlemore (Note: Once with Pnau (11), and once with Empire of the Sun (93))	11, 93
2	A.B. Original	16, 45
2	Dan Sultan (Note: Twice with A.B. Original (16, 45))	16, 45
2	Kanye West	22, 72
2	Rüfüs	30, 55
2	Drake	31, 99
2	Dune Rats	33, 34
2	Pharrell (Note: Once with Kid Cudi (40), once with Frank Ocean (84))	40, 84
2	Broods	42, 71
2	D.D Dumbo	44, 47
2	Frank Ocean	59, 84
2	Dope Lemon	62, 87
2	Beyoncé (Note: Once solo (66), once with Frank Ocean (84))	66, 84

=== Countries represented ===
Country	Total
Australia	66
United States	21
United Kingdom	12
Canada	5
Sweden	3
France	2
Germany	2
New Zealand	2
Barbados	1
Denmark	1
Nigeria	1

=== Records ===
- The four highest-ranked tracks in the 2016 Hottest 100 were all by Australian artists (excluding the vocal feature of Canadian singer Kai on "Never Be like You"), which marks the longest continuous streak of Australians at the countdown's top, and the first time that the top four songs were by artists from the same country.
  - This countdown also marks the first time the top three tracks have featured female vocalists. The top three artists in the countdown were all Unearthed artists.
- Kai is the first Canadian artist to feature in the #1 song of a Hottest 100.
- The 2016 list includes four covers recorded for Triple J's Like a Version: the DMA's cover of Cher; the A.B. Original cover of Paul Kelly; the Halsey cover of Justin Bieber; and the Paces cover of L D R U. This breaks the record of three Like a Version covers set in 2014 by Chet Faker, Chvrches, and Meg Mac.
  - The song "Keeping Score" by L D R U made the countdown for the second consecutive year with a cover by Paces and Guy Sebastian.
- Nine songs in a row were by Australian artists in 2016, between positions #97 and #89, breaking the longest run of eight consecutive Australian songs set in 1999, 2012, and 2014.
- Paul Kelly's feature on the A.B. Original cover of "Dumb Things" set the record for the longest absence between countdowns; Kelly last appeared in the 2000 countdown.
  - Earlier in the same countdown, The Avalanches' "Subways" broke the prior record of 13 years for the longest absence between countdowns; they last appeared in 2001.
- The 2016 list features 11 different nationalities, equaling the record set in 1994 and 2015.
  - Wizkid's feature on "One Dance" made him Nigeria's first artist to appear in a Hottest 100, and the Hottest 100's first artist representing an African nation since Angélique Kidjo in 1996.
  - Rihanna's appearance on "Too Good" allowed for the first ever appearance of the established pop star, and of an artist from Barbados, in a Hottest 100.
- Five of Violent Soho's tracks feature in the countdown, making them the first artist with over four tracks in one countdown since Hilltop Hoods in 2006.
- Gretta Ray's entry in the countdown with her song "Drive" at #27 marks the best Hottest 100 performance by an Unearthed High winner.
- For the first time since 2011 no previous Hottest 100 winners featured in the countdown.
- Both members of Angus & Julia Stone got a respective track in the list as solo artists; Angus Stone with Dope Lemon and Julia Stone who featured on a Golden Features song.
- Illy made his eighth consecutive appearance in the Hottest 100, having appeared in every annual countdown since 2009.

== Triple J album poll, 2016 ==
The annual Triple J album poll was held in December and announced on 18 December. J Award winner D.D Dumbo missed out on the top 10, with his album Utopia Defeated coming in 11th place.

Note: Australian artists

Bold indicates Hottest 100 winner.

#	Artist	Album	Country of origin	Tracks in the Hottest 100
1	Violent Soho	Waco	Australia	14, 53, 69, 73, 92, (15 in 2015)
2	**Flume**	**Skin**	**Australia**	**1, 8, 37, 95**
3	The Avalanches	Wildflower	Australia	28, 75, 91
4	Rüfüs	Bloom	Australia	30, 55 (12, 28 in 2015)
5	Ball Park Music	Every Night the Same Dream	Australia	DNC (141, 143, 156 in Hottest 200)
6	Sticky Fingers	Westway (The Glitter & the Slums)	Australia	29, 36, 51
7	DMA's	Hills End	Australia	39, (48 in 2014), (77 in 2015)
8	Radiohead	A Moon Shaped Pool	United Kingdom	79
9	King Gizzard & the Lizard Wizard	Nonagon Infinity	Australia	61
10	Frank Ocean	Blonde	United States	59, 84
11	D.D Dumbo	Utopia Defeated	Australia	44, 47
12	Glass Animals	How to Be a Human Being	United Kingdom	38, 63, 98
13	Kanye West	The Life of Pablo	United States	22, 72
14	Safia	Internal	Australia	26, 85, 89, (23 in 2015)
15	Bon Iver	22, A Million	United States	DNC (102 in Hottest 200)
16	Catfish and the Bottlemen	The Ride	United Kingdom	19, 57, 77
17	Montaigne	Glorious Heights	Australia	25
18	Big Scary	Animal	Australia	17
19	Matt Corby	Telluric	Australia	(53 in 2015)
20	Camp Cope	Camp Cope	Australia	74

== CD release ==
Triple J's Hottest 100 Volume 24

Compilation album by Various artists
- Released: 24 February 2017
- Length: 165:14
- Labels: Triple J, ABC Music

=== Disc one ===
No.	Title	Artists	Length
1.	"Never Be Like You" (#1)	Flume featuring Kai	3:54
2.	"Adore" (#2)	Amy Shark	3:01
3.	"Jungle" (#3)	Tash Sultana	5:14
4.	"1955" (#4)	Hilltop Hoods featuring Montaigne & Tom Thum	3:49
5.	"Viceroy" (#14)	Violent Soho	3:13
6.	"Believe (Triple J Like A Version)" (#6)	DMA's	3:13
7.	"Redbone" (#5)	Childish Gambino	5:24
8.	"Stranger" (#9)	Peking Duk featuring Elliphant	3:25
9.	"Papercuts" (#7)	Illy featuring Vera Blue	4:16
10.	"Cocoon" (#12)	Milky Chance	4:14
11.	"7" (#19)	Catfish and the Bottlemen	4:16
12.	"Starboy" (#10)	The Weeknd featuring Daft Punk	3:48
13.	"Chameleon" (#11)	Pnau	3:17
14.	"Death to the Lads" (#21)	The Smith Street Band	3:30
15.	"January 26" (#16)	A.B. Original featuring Dan Sultan	3:17
16.	"Genghis Khan" (#15)	Miike Snow	3:30
17.	"On Hold" (#20)	The xx	3:43
18.	"The Opposite of Us" (#17)	Big Scary	4:19
19.	"Satan" (#44)	D.D Dumbo	4:36
20.	"Lost: Season One" (#74)	Camp Cope	3:49

=== Disc two ===
No.	Title	Artists	Length
1.	"Because I Love You" (#25)	Montaigne	3:38
2.	"Make Them Wheels Roll" (#26)	Safia	4:04
3.	"Our Town" (#29)	Sticky Fingers	3:15
4.	"Creepin" (#48)	Kingswood	3:46
5.	"Youth" (#38)	Glass Animals	3:49
6.	"Frankie Sinatra" (#28)	The Avalanches	3:46
7.	"Drive" (#27)	Gretta Ray	4:58
8.	"Bullshit" (#33)	Dune Rats	3:00
9.	"Say a Prayer for Me" (#55)	Rüfüs	3:17
10.	"Dang!" (#46)	Mac Miller featuring Anderson .Paak	5:06
11.	"Girlie Bits" (#58)	Ali Barter	3:11
12.	"Gamma Knife" (#61)	King Gizzard and the Lizard Wizard	4:18
13.	"Come On Mess Me Up" (#24)	Cub Sport	3:22
14.	"Heartlines" (#42)	Broods	3:15
15.	"All Fucked Up" (#65)	The Amity Affliction	3:49
16.	"World of Our Love" (#35)	Client Liaison	4:35
17.	"Alaska" (#64)	Maggie Rogers	3:04
18.	"Marinade" (#62)	Dope Lemon	3:57
19.	"Strange Diseases" (#50)	Gang of Youths	3:20
20.	"Final Song" (#43)	MØ	3:54
