= If This Is All We're Going to Be =

2016 album by Luca Brasi

Studio album by Luca Brasi
- Released: 29 April 2016
- Recorded: November 2015 – April 2016
- Studios: Red Planet, Hobart, TAS
- Genres: Alternative rock, punk rock
- Length: 33:00
- Label: Poison City
- Producer: Jimmy Balderston

Luca Brasi chronology
By a Thread (2014)	If This Is All We're Going to Be (2016)	Stay (2018)

Singles from If This Is All We're Going to Be
- 1. "Aeroplane" Released: 26 November 2015; 2. "The Cascade Blues" Released: 9 February 2016; 3. "Count Me Out" Released: November 2016

If This Is All We're Going to Be is the third studio album by Australian rock band Luca Brasi, released on 29 April 2016 by Poison City Records. It was produced by Jimmy Balderston and recorded at Red Planet in Hobart between November 2015 and April 2016.

== Background and promotion ==
If This Is All We're Going to Be was written over the couple of years between their last release. Their first single "Aeroplane" was released in November 2015 as a limited promo-single, it was later released digitally. The band released their second single "The Cascade Blues" on 9 February 2016. The band released their third single "Count Me Out" on 30 December containing guest vocals from Georgia McDonald of Camp Cope.

The album was released to Luca Brasi's BandCamp on 29 April where all proceeds were donated to Minus18, Australia's largest youth-led network for the LGBT community.

== Critical reception ==
Professional ratings
Review scores
Source	Rating
AAA Backstage	4/5 stars
The AU Review	8.5/10
The Brag	4/5 stars
KillYourStereo	80/100
Spotlight Report	4.5/5 stars

The album received positive reviews from sources. AAA Backstage praised the album saying, "The new progression is pleasant, refreshing, and shows that the Luca Brasi train is not close to slowing down." The AU Review gave the album a positive review and said it was "another fitting chapter in what’s becoming a fascinating and brilliant musical career." Alex Sievers from KillYourStereo rated the album 80/100 and said: "Despite their repetitive sound, Luca Brasi is living and breathing proof that bands from Tasmania can outshine those from the glorious mainland." The Brag gave the album a positive review and said: "Luca Brasi have come through with one of the better Australian punk albums of the year." In a positive review, Spotlight Report wrote, "Luca Brasi have clearly worked hard from their first two albums to settle into themselves, yet still push their abilities as musicians." The track "Anything Near Conviction" was voted into the Triple J Hottest 100, 2016, at No. 90.

== Track listing ==
Track listing adapted from AllMusic.

No.	Title	Length
1.	"Aeroplane"	3:22
2.	"Say It Back"	3:43
3.	"Spin and Collapse"	2:45
4.	"Treading Water"	3:23
5.	"The Cascade Blues"	3:27
6.	"Drop Out"	2:11
7.	"Overwhelmed / Ill Prepared"	3:00
8.	"Man, This Is Living"	2:30
9.	"Anything Near Conviction"	3:47
10.	"Count Me Out"	4:52
Total length:		33:00

== Personnel ==
Luca Brasi

- Tyler Richardson – lead vocals, bass
- Thomas Busby – lead guitar, backing vocals
- Patrick Marshall – rhythm guitar, vocals
- Danny Flood – drums

Additional musicians

- Georgia McDonald – guest vocals on track 10
- Tom Lanyon – guest vocals on track 7

Production

- Jimmy Balderston – producer
- Brian McTernan – mixing

== Charts ==
Chart (2016)	Peak position
Australian Albums (ARIA)	18

== Release history ==
Region	Date	Label	Format	Catalog
Australia	29 April 2016	Poison City Records	compact disc, digital download	PCR119CD
Australia	29 April 2016	Poison City Records	long play	PCR119
