= Luca Brasi (band) =

Australian band

- Origin: St Helens, Tasmania, Australia
- Genres: Melodic punk, alternative rock
- Years active: 2009–2025, 2026
- Labels: Cooking Vinyl Australia, Poison City Records
- Members: Tyler Richardson; Thomas Busby; Danny Flood; Nick Manuell
- Past members: Mitchell Dobson; Saxon Hall; Patrick Marshall
- Website: www.lucabrasi.com.au

Luca Brasi are an Australian rock band formed in St Helens, Tasmania in 2009. The current line-up of the band features Thomas Busby on lead guitar, Nick Manuell on rhythm guitar, Danny Flood on drums, and Tyler Richardson on lead vocals and bass guitar. To date, the group have released six studio albums: Extended Family (2011), By a Thread (2014), If This Is All We're Going to Be (2016), Stay (2018), Everything Is Tenuous (2021) and The World Don't Owe You Anything (2023). Stay became their first ARIA top 10.

The band are currently signed to Cooking Vinyl Australia, and have toured with bands such as Alexisonfire, Violent Soho, Pup, You Me at Six, Turnover and Pianos Become the Teeth. They have also performed at St Jerome's Laneway Festival, Splendour in the Grass and Falls Festival.

Luca Brasi have been recognised as a lasting influence on music in Tasmania. Various Tasmanian musicians, including Maddy Jane, Kat Edwards, the Sleepyheads and the Tinderboxers have cited the band as mentors, with the former stating that "[they've] support[ed] their local scene through and through." They have also been credited with leading the way for other Tasmanian musicians in the industry, several of whom feel that they would otherwise feel "isolated" due to being separated from the larger industry in the mainland of Australia.

As of June 2025, the group are on a hiatus.

In March 2026, the group announced a 10th anniversary celebratory tour of If This Is All We're Going to Be.

== History ==
=== 2009–2011: Early years and Extended Family ===
Luca Brasi — so named after the character from The Godfather — formed in 2009 with Richardson, Busby, guitarist Mitchell Dobson and drummer Saxon Hall. A demo EP, Sleeps with the Fishes, was released in 2010. Three songs from the demo—"Theme Song from HQ", "Beacons" and "Isaac Bowen"—were re-recorded for the band's debut LP, Extended Family. The album was recorded in Hobart with Nic White and Lincoln Le Fevre. It was released in September 2011 via Poison City Records.

=== 2011–2015: Lineup change and By a Thread ===
Shortly after the release of Extended Family, Patrick Marshall joined the band officially as a third guitarist. This line-up would record one seven-inch together, entitled Tassie, in late 2012. In September of that year Luca Brasi announced that founding drummer and guitarist; Saxon Hall and Mitchell Dobson respectively, would be leaving the band after playing their final show with the band at the Poison City Weekender in Melbourne. Drummer Danny Flood—who had previously filled in for Hall on a tour with Title Fight in March 2013—was brought in as a full-time replacement shortly before a national tour with Bodyjar. Dobson was not replaced, converting the band back into a quartet.

The band's second album, By a Thread, was released in March 2014; it was again put out through Poison City Records. The album spawned two singles: "Borders and Statelines" and "Benthos", with music videos being made for both songs. An assortment of songs that did not make the final cut of the album were compiled into an EP, Loose Threads, which was released in early 2015.

=== 2016–2019: If This Is All We're Going to Be and Stay ===
A new single, "Aeroplane", was released shortly before the band undertook a national support slot on Kisschasy's farewell tour of Australia. The song was the lead single from their third studio album, entitled If This Is All We're Going to Be. It was released in April 2016 and marked the band's first-ever appearance on the ARIA Album Charts. Their track "Anything Near Conviction" from the album was voted into the Triple J Hottest 100, 2016, at number 90. Their Like a Version cover of Paul Kelly's "How to Make Gravy" was listed at No. 127 in the supplementary "Hottest 200" list. The album also spawned the single "Count Me Out", which features vocals from Camp Cope vocalist/guitarist Georgia "Maq" McDonald.

In June 2017, the band released "Got to Give" and performed a headlining tour of Australia in support of it through June and July. "Let it Slip" was released in April 2018 followed by the band's fourth studio album, Stay on 22 June 2018; and is the band's first album to be released via Cooking Vinyl Australia. The album peaked at number 10 on the ARIA Charts. The band performed a six-date national tour to promote album in August. After performing their tour's Sydney show, Luca Brasi called out several troublemakers on their social media for pushing and shoving people in the crowd, causing some fans to leave the show early. Calling them "ropehead fucks", the band condemned their actions, stating "consideration for how you occupy space at shows, and showing respect for your audience mates, will always make for a better experience for everyone."

The band announced another national tour for 2019, this time for their single "The Clothes I Slept In". The tour was the band's longest to date, spanning two months and twenty-one dates performing in regional hubs of all states.

=== 2019–2023: Everything is Tenuous and The World Don't Owe You Anything ===
In August 2019, the band released a new single, "Tangled; Content". This was followed in February 2020 by "This Selfish Love". The band were scheduled to tour Australia in May 2020 with support from Drug Church, Moaning Lisa and Kat Edwards. This, however, was cancelled due to the COVID-19 pandemic.

In June 2020, the band released a split seven-inch vinyl with Melbourne band Slowly Slowly.

The band released their third single of 2020, "Dying to Feel Alive", in August 2020. This was followed by an acoustic tour of their native Tasmania, which sold out all eight shows the day it went on sale.

On 19 November 2020, the band announced their fifth studio album, Everything Is Tenuous. The announcement was accompanied by another new single, "Every Time You're Here (I'm Gone)". The band released the album in February 2021.

In December 2021, the band released "Jackies Are On the March", an original theme for the Tasmania JackJumpers celebrating the team's inclusion in the 2021–22 NBL season. In March 2023, the band returned to the triple j studios for a second Like a Version session. Along with performing their song "Party Scene", the band covered the song "Iris" by the Goo Goo Dolls with assistance from Melbourne-based singer-songwriter Eaglemont.

In June 2023, Luca Brasi announced the release of their sixth studio album The World Don't Owe You Anything, which was released on 29 September 2023.

=== 2024–2025: hiatus ===
In November 2024, the band announced that Marshall would be departing the band, to be replaced by Nick Manuell.

As of June 2025, the group are on a hiatus.

=== 2026: tour ===
In March 2026, the group announced a 10th anniversary celebratory tour around Australia of If This Is All We're Going to Be.

== Members ==
Current members

- Tyler Richardson – lead vocals, bass (2009–present)
- Thomas Busby – lead guitar, keyboards (2009–present)
- Danny Flood – drums (2013–present)
- Nick Manuell – rhythm guitar, backing vocals (2024–present)

Former members

- Mitchell Dobson – rhythm guitar, backing vocals (2009–2013)
- Saxon Hall – drums (2009–2013)
- Patrick Marshall – rhythm guitar, backing vocals (2012–2024)

== Discography ==
=== Studio albums ===
| Title | Album details | Peak chart positions |
| Title | Album details | AUS |
|---|---|---|
| Extended Family | Released: 26 September 2011; Format: CD, LP, digital download; Label: Poison City Records (PCR044) | — |
| By a Thread | Released: 14 March 2014; Format: CD, LP, digital download; Label: Poison City Records (PCR081) | — |
| If This Is All We're Going to Be | Released: 29 April 2016; Format: CD, LP, digital download, streaming; Label: Poison City Records (PCR119) | 18 |
| Stay | Released: 22 June 2018; Format: CD, LP, digital download, streaming; Label: Cooking Vinyl Australia (CVLP076) | 10 |
| Everything Is Tenuous | Released: 12 February 2021; Format: CD, LP, digital download, streaming; Label: Cooking Vinyl Australia | 7 |
| The World Don't Owe You Anything | Released: 29 September 2023; Format: CD, LP, digital download, streaming; Label: Cooking Vinyl Australia | 43 |

=== Live albums ===
List of live albums, with release date and label shown
| Title | Details |
|---|---|
| Live & Acoustic in Melbourne | Released: 18 October 2024; Format: LP, Digital download; Label: Luca Brasi, Cooking Vinyl (LBA001) |

=== Extended plays ===
List of EPs, with release date and label shown
| Title | EP details |
|---|---|
| Tassie | Released: 24 October 2012; Format: CD, LP, Digital download; Label: Poison City Records (PCR057) |
| Loose Threads | Released: 13 March 2015; Format: CD, LP, Digital download; Label: Poison City Records (PCR103) |
| Luca Brasi/Slowly Slowly | Split 7-inch with Slowly Slowly; Released: 19 June 2020; Format: 7-inch vinyl, digital download, streaming; Label: Independent |

=== Singles ===
List of singles, showing year released and album
| Title | Year | Album |
|---|---|---|
| "Theme Song from HQ" | 2011 | Extended Family |
| "Viva Tassie Cabrones" | 2012 | Tassie |
| "Borders & Statelines" | 2013 | By a Thread |
| "Benthos" | 2014 | By a Thread |
| "Aeroplane" | 2015 | If This Is All We're Going to Be |
| "The Cascade Blues" | 2016 | If This Is All We're Going to Be |
| "Got to Give" | 2016 | Stay |
| "Count Me Out" | 2016 | If This Is All We're Going to Be |
| "How to Make Gravy" (live) (Triple J Like a Version) | 2017 | Like a Version |
| "Let It Slip" | 2018 | Stay |
| "Clothes I Slept In" | 2018 | Stay |
| "Reeling" | 2018 | Stay |
| "Tangled; Content" | 2019 | Everything Is Tenuous |
| "This Selfish Love" | 2020 | Everything Is Tenuous |
| "Yossarian" | 2020 | Luca Brasi / Slowly Slowly |
| "Dying to Feel Alive" | 2020 | Everything Is Tenuous |
| "Every Time You're Here (I'm Gone)" | 2020 | Everything Is Tenuous |
| "Jackies Are On the March" | 2021 | Non-album single |
| "Party Scene" | 2022 | The World Don't Owe You Anything |
| "The World Don't Owe You Anything" | 2023 | The World Don't Owe You Anything |
| "Sonny" | 2023 | The World Don't Owe You Anything |
| "'Til Forever" | 2023 | The World Don't Owe You Anything |

== Awards and nominations ==
=== AIR Awards ===
The Australian Independent Record Awards (commonly known informally as AIR Awards) is an annual awards night to recognise, promote and celebrate the success of Australia's Independent Music sector.

| Year | Nominee / work | Award | Result | Ref. |
|---|---|---|---|---|
| 2017 | If This Is All We're Going to Be | Best Independent Hard Rock, Heavy or Punk Album | Nominated | |
| 2024 | The World Don't Owe You Anything | Best Independent Punk Album or EP | Nominated | |

=== ARIA Music Awards ===
The ARIA Music Awards are a set of annual ceremonies presented by Australian Recording Industry Association (ARIA), which recognise excellence, innovation, and achievement across all genres of the music of Australia. They commenced in 1987.

| Year | Nominee / work | Award | Result | Ref. |
|---|---|---|---|---|
| 2018 | Stay | Best Rock Album | Nominated | |

=== National Live Music Awards ===
The National Live Music Awards (NLMAs) commenced in 2016 to recognize contributions to the live music industry in Australia.

| Year | Nominee / work | Award | Result | Ref. |
|---|---|---|---|---|
| 2016 | Luca Brasi | Tasmanian Live Act of the Year | Won | |
| 2018 | Luca Brasi | Live Hard Rock Act of the Year | Nominated | |
| 2018 | Tyler Richardson (Luca Brasi) | Tasmanian Live Voice of the Year | Won | |
| 2023 | Luca Brasi | Best Live Act in Tasmania | Won | |
