= Everything Is Dangerous but Nothing's Surprising =

Studio album by Body Type
- Released: 20 May 2022
- Recorded: 2020
- Genres: Post-punk, garage rock
- Label: Poison City
- Producer: Jonathan Boulet

Body Type chronology
EP2 (2019)	Everything Is Dangerous but Nothing's Surprising (2022)	Expired Candy (2023)

Singles from Everything Is Dangerous but Nothing's Surprising
- 1. "Sex & Rage" Released: 10 February 2022; 2. "Buoyancy" Released: 16 March 2022; 3. "The Charm" Released: 28 April 2022; 4. "A Line" Released: 19 May 2022

Everything Is Dangerous but Nothing's Surprising is the debut studio album by the Australian rock band Body Type, released on 20 May 2022. It was produced by Jonathan Boulet. In 2023, the album was nominated for the 2022 Australian Music Prize, and it was also nominated at the AIR Awards of 2023 in the Best Independent Punk Album or EP category.

== Promotion and release ==
Body Type announced the release of their debut album, Everything Is Dangerous But Nothing's Surprising, on 10 February 2022, alongside the release of the album's first single: "Sex & Rage". The single was named after the Eve Babitz novel of the same name. Another single, "The Charm", was released on 28 April 2022. Vocalist and guitarist Sophie McComish said the song "[challenged] the male ego and [tried] to emulate it from a female perspective". The album was released on 20 May 2022 via Poison City Records. In an interview with 3RRR after the album's release, the band explored the experience of making music as women in a male-dominated music industry and how this was incorporated into the album.

== Critical reception ==
Professional ratings
Review scores
Source	Rating
DIY	4/5 stars
Gigwise	7/10
The Line of Best Fit	8/10
NME	5/5 stars
Under the Radar	8/10

The album was released to positive critical reception. The Australian radio station Double J placed it at 48 on their top 50 best albums of 2022 list, with writer Cassie Walker opining that the album produced a feeling of nostalgia through the different themes present throughout.

== Track listing ==
Everything Is Dangerous but Nothing's Surprising track listing
No.	Title	Length
1.	"A Line"	3:10
2.	"The Brood"	3:24
3.	"The Charm"	4:09
4.	"Couple Song"	3:52
5.	"Futurism"	3:41
6.	"Hot Plastic Punishment"	0:53
7.	"Flight Path"	2:44
8.	"Buoyancy"	3:09
9.	"Sex & Rage"	2:42
10.	"An Animal"	5:45
11.	"Everything Is Dangerous but Nothing's Surprising"	3:30
Total length:		38:30
