= Tally (album) =

Studio album by Body Type
- Released: 24 July 2026
- Recorded: February 2025
- Studios: Velveteen Laboratory, Los Angeles
- Genre: Power pop
- Length: 31:53
- Labels: Poison City; P(doom)
- Producer: Stella Mozgawa

Body Type chronology
Expired Candy (2023)	Tally (2026)

Singles from Tally
- 1. "And What Else?" Released: 8 April 2026; 2. "Mulberry" Released: 12 May 2026; 3. "Sick Bag" Released: 16 June 2026

Tally is the third studio album by the Australian rock band Body Type, released on 24 July 2026 through Poison City Records in Australia and New Zealand and through P(doom) Records everywhere else. The album was produced by Stella Mozgawa and was preceded by the singles "And What Else?", "Mulberry", and "Sick Bag". It was met with positive critical reception upon release and debuted on the Australian ARIA Charts at number 42.

== Background and recording ==
In the period between Tally and their previous album, Expired Candy, band members also pursued their own projects. Annabel Blackman, under the pseudonym Solo Career, released the album Interior Delirium in 2025. Cecil Coleman played drums in a country band, among others, and studied law, obtaining her degree shortly before Tally's release. Sophie McComish operated a label called Blossom Rot Records, and Georgia Wilkinson-Derums played in a punk band called G2g, who released an album called The Gherkin.

Unlike their first two albums, which faced strict deadlines and were both released in quick succession, the band spent significantly more time writing for their next record. The earliest demos date back to the start of 2024. In February 2025, they recorded Tally at Velveteen Laboratory Studios in Los Angeles with producer Stella Mozgawa.

== Composition ==
Tally has been musically described as a power pop album that largely shifts away from the post-punk that had characterised the band. Individual songs have been otherwise compared to other genres such as indie pop on "And What Else?" and "Planet 8" and post-punk on "Eye Is a Mouth Is a Face". The sound on the record was heavily influenced by their experiences in Los Angeles and their producer Stella Mozgawa, whose input lent the album a "softer" feel than their previous works, where they mostly just tried to recreate how they sounded live.

The song "Eye Is a Mouth Is a Face" was inspired by an abstract expressionist exhibition by Louise Bourgeois at the Art Gallery of New South Wales. They related the exhibition, entitled Has the Day Invaded the Night or Has the Night Invaded the Day?, to their own experiences as women in a band. Annabel Blackman explained that "the exhibition seems to speak a lot to [Bourgeois'] challenges of being a mother and maybe not being maternal, or not feeling like a good mother – the tension between that." The song was written spontaneously, and it is the first that they all wrote as a collective.

== Promotion and singles ==
Three singles have preceded the release of Tally. On 8 April 2026, alongside the announcement that they had signed to King Gizzard & the Lizard Wizard's record label P(doom) Records in the U.S. and Europe, Body Type released a single entitled "And What Else?" Later, on 12 May, they announced the album and accompanied the news with a second single, "Mulberry", followed by the third single, "Sick Bag", on 16 June. The accompanying music video was directed by Madeline Purdy and features band member Sophie McComish walking in business attire around the heavily-crowded Martin Place in Sydney, Australia. With Tally, the band simultaneously released a music video for "Eye Is a Mouth Is a Face". In October, Body Type will tour in Europe in support of Courtney Barnett.

== Release ==
Tally was released on 24 July 2026 via P(doom) everywhere except Australia and New Zealand, where it was released on Poison City Records, the label the band used for their two albums. It debuted on the main ARIA Chart at number 42, marking the band's first record to chart within the top 50 in their native country. Additionally, it placed on the Australian Artist Albums Chart, an ARIA subchart, at number 3.

== Critical reception ==
Professional ratings
Aggregate scores
Source	Rating
Metacritic	77/100
Review scores
Source	Rating
AllMusic	3.5/5 stars
DIY	4/5 stars
Mojo	4/5 stars
Uncut	7/10
Under the Radar	8/10

According to the review aggregator Metacritic, Tally received "generally favorable reviews" based on a weighted average score of 77 out of 100 from five critic scores. Rating the album eight out of ten, Andy Von Pip of Under the Radar noted the relatively long gap between their previous album and thought the resulting Tally was "worth the wait", such that it maintains the qualities that made the band "such an engaging prospect" at the onset of their career. Von Pip added that the record is replete with new ideas, witty lyrics, attitude, and "irresistible melodies". In a four-star review for DIY magazine, Bella Martin said that Tally is at its best when the songs "shapeshift between styles", highlighting "Planet 8" as the main example. Martin continued to say that some songs like "Eye Is a Mouth Is a Face" felt too "samey", though they noted that this may be attributed "purely [to] the assuredness of a band now three albums in", concluding that the record is "a fun listen" regardless. Elsewhere, Peter Watts of Uncut complimented the band's use of "sweet-sounding charm" as a cover for "hilariously snarky commentary", adding in their seven out of ten review that it would appeal to fans of artists such as Courtney Barnett, Dry Cleaning, and Wet Leg.

== Track listing ==
All lyrics are written by Annabel Blackman; all music is composed by Body Type.

Tally track listing
No.	Title	Length
1.	"And What Else?"	3:13
2.	"Sick Bag"	2:58
3.	"Mulberry"	3:41
4.	"Eye Is a Mouth Is a Face"	3:26
5.	"Tally"	2:42
6.	"To Give a Rose"	3:27
7.	"Planet 8"	3:04
8.	"Gorgeous"	2:49
9.	"Do You Want to Cry Your Eyes Out?"	3:01
10.	"Everything All in a Row"	3:32
Total length:		31:53

== Personnel ==
Musical credits are adapted from Apple Music. Technical credits are adapted from the vinyl liner notes.

=== Body Type ===
- Annabel Blackman – electric guitar (tracks 1–6, 8–10), lead vocals (1, 5, 9), background vocals (3, 4, 8), design
- Cecelia Coleman – drums (1–6, 8–10), background vocals (5)
- Sophie McComish – electric guitar (1–6, 8–10), background vocals (1, 3, 5, 9), lead vocals (2, 4, 6, 8, 10), synthesiser (2)
- Georgia Wilkinson-Derums – bass (1–6, 9, 10), background vocals (1, 8), lead vocals (3, 4)

=== Additional personnel ===
- Stella Mozgawa – synthesiser (1–4), drums (5), production (all tracks)
- Jim E. Brown – spoken word (3)
- Bonnie Knight – engineering (all tracks)
- Mark Perkins – engineering (all tracks)
- Omar Yakar Jr. – mixing (all tracks)
- Jonathan Boulet – mastering (all tracks)
- Elliot Shields – front and back cover art

== Charts ==
Chart performance for Tally
Chart (2026)	Peak position
Australian Albums (ARIA)	42
Australian Artist Albums (ARIA)	3
