= Expired Candy =

Studio album by Body Type
- Released: 2 June 2023
- Studio: Stranded (Bellambi, New South Wales)
- Genres: Indie rock; post-punk
- Length: 41:30
- Label: Poison City
- Producer: Jonathan Boulet

Body Type chronology
Everything Is Dangerous but Nothing's Surprising (2022)	Expired Candy (2023)	Tally (2026)

Singles from Expired Candy
- 1. "Miss the World" Released: 22 February 2023; 2. "Holding On" Released: 23 March 2023; 3. "Weekend" Released: 4 May 2023

Expired Candy is the second studio album by Australian rock band Body Type. It was produced by Jonathan Boulet and released through Poison City Records on 2 June 2023. The album was largely written while band members were in lockdown during the COVID-19 pandemic.

== Singles and release ==
The first single, "Miss the World", was released on 22 February 2023, less than a year after their debut album Everything Is Dangerous but Nothing's Surprising; alongside this was the announcement for Expired Candy, containing details of the release date, cover art, and track listing. On 23 March, the band released a second single, "Holding On", with a video directed by Nick Mckk and filmed on Wurundjeri land. The third and final single, entitled "Weekend", was released on 4 May, accompanied by a music video directed by Throat Pasta.

Expired Candy was released on 2 June 2023 on Poison City Records, subsequently entering the Australian Independent Albums Chart at no. 11.

== Critical reception ==
Professional ratings
Aggregate scores
Source	Rating
Metacritic	79/100
Review scores
Source	Rating
Clash	7/10
DIY	4/5 stars
Gigwise	7/10
The Guardian	4/5 stars
NME	5/5 stars
Tom Hull – on the Web	B+(***)
Uncut	7/10
Under the Radar	8.5/10

According to the review aggregator Metacritic, Expired Candy received "generally favorable reviews" based on a weighted average score of 79 out of 100 from five critic scores. Under the Radar's Andy Von Pip said that the songs "pulsate with edgy, fiery energy while exuding an underlying sense of profound joy and liberation". Vicky Greer for Clash described Expired Candy as a "solid summer rock album" that builds upon "an already appealing sound," arguing that it shows promise for the band's future endeavours.

Contrasting the album to the group's debut Everything Is Dangerous but Nothing's Surprising, Giselle Au-Nhien Nguyen said that in The Guardian that in light of the band's "shift towards pop, ... there's a stronger focus on melody and a bolshie, boisterous irreverence that's incredibly charming." In a five star review for NME, despite concerns whether or not the group could produce a worthy follow-up, Doug Wallen thought that Body Type retained their identity, "speaking their own shared language of sidewinding melodies, spontaneous vocal pile-ups and thorny propulsion".

Towards the end of 2023, Expired Candy was ranked 68 out of 100 on God Is in the TV's year-end best albums list. In 2026, music critic Robert Christgau ranked Expired Candy the fourth best album out of sixty-one for the 2025 edition of the "Dean's List", an annual album roundup published on his Substack blog And It Don't Stop.

== Track listing ==
All tracks are written by Body Type.

Expired Candy track listing
No.	Title	Length
1.	"Holding On"	2:48
2.	"Summer Forever"	2:51
3.	"Weekend"	3:09
4.	"Tread Overhead"	3:40
5.	"Sha La La"	3:39
6.	"Creation of Man"	3:54
7.	"Miss the World"	2:54
8.	"Anti-Romancer"	2:59
9.	"Beat You Up"	4:02
10.	"Albion Park"	2:18
11.	"Expired Candy"	3:02
12.	"Dream Girls"	2:25
13.	"Shake Yer Memory"	3:49
Total length:		41:30

== Personnel ==
Credits are adapted from the vinyl liner notes and Apple Music.

=== Body Type ===
- Annabel Blackman – electric guitar, lead vocals
- Cecil Coleman – drums, percussion, "oohs", "aahs"
- Sophie McComish – electric guitar, lead vocals
- Georgia Wilkinson-Derums – bass, background vocals

=== Technical and design ===
- Jonathan Boulet – production, engineering, mixing, mastering
- Bowen Shakallis – engineering assistance
- Annabel Blackman – cover art
- Ashley Brockman, Clare Read – makeup
- Toni Wilkinson – photography

== Charts ==
Chart performance for Expired Candy
Chart (2023)	Peak position
Australian Independent Albums (AIR)	11
