= A Lover's Guide to a Lucid Dream =

Studio album by Safia
- Released: 23 September 2023
- Length: 48:57
- Label: Safia; Warner Music Australia
- Producer: Safia

Safia chronology
Story's Start or End (2019)	A Lover's Guide to a Lucid Dream (2023)

Singles from A Lover's Guide to a Lucid Dream
- 1. "Falling Down" Released: 21 October 2022; 2. "Today" Released: 7 March 2023; 3. "That's the Thing About Love" Released: 26 May 2023; 4. "Float" Released: 3 August 2023; 5. "A Lover's Guide to a Lucid Dream" Released: 1 September 2023

A Lover's Guide to a Lucid Dream is the third studio album by Australian electronica indie pop band, Safia, released on 22 September 2023. The album was announced on 3 August 2023, alongside single "Float" and announcement of an Australian tour, running from October to December 2023.

== Critical reception ==
Professional ratings
Review scores
Source	Rating
Rolling Stone Australia	4/5 stars

Zanda Wilson from Rolling Stone Australia said "Safia expertly tread the line between eerie and ethereal on their third album" saying the album is "impossibly well-titled, pulling together themes of love, loss, and change".

Bryget Chrisfield from Beat Magazine complimented vocalist and keyboardist Ben Woolner, calling his voice "a wellness tool" and remarking that "his distinctive, yearning timbre regularly cascades before leaping octaves to attain thrillingly unexpected peaks". Chrisfield called the album "an interplanetary good vibe zone".

Alex Gallagher from NME wrote that "the Canberra trio shine anew on their third album, which glistens with pristine pop production while beating with a very human heart underneath."

== Track listing ==
All tracks are written by Michael Bell, Harrison Sayers, and Benjamin Woolner-Kirkham.

1. "A Lover's Guide to a Lucid Dream" – 5:19
2. "Vertigo" – 4:04
3. "Falling Down" – 4:38
4. "Falling Down" (reprise) – 1:02
5. "Float" – 2:57
6. "The Now" – 4:20
7. "No Reason" – 3:57
8. "Today" – 3:35
9. "Interlude" – 0:33
10. "The Thing About Love" – 3:34
11. "Think About It" – 3:49
12. "Fall Right Back to You" – 4:06
13. "Maybe It's Time" – 4:46
14. "Season Changing" – 5:52

== Personnel ==
Safia

- Michael Bell – production (tracks 1–3, 5–8, 10–12, 14)
- Harrison Sayers – production (2, 5, 6, 8, 10–13)
- Benjamin Woolner-Kirkham – production

Technical

- Alex Gooden – mixing
- Dale Becker – mastering (1–7, 9–14)
- Matt Colton – mastering (8)

== Charts ==
Chart performance for A Lover's Guide to a Lucid Dream
Chart (2023)	Peak position
Australian Digital Albums (ARIA)	5
Australian Physical Albums (ARIA)	72
