= Cayetana (band) =

American rock band

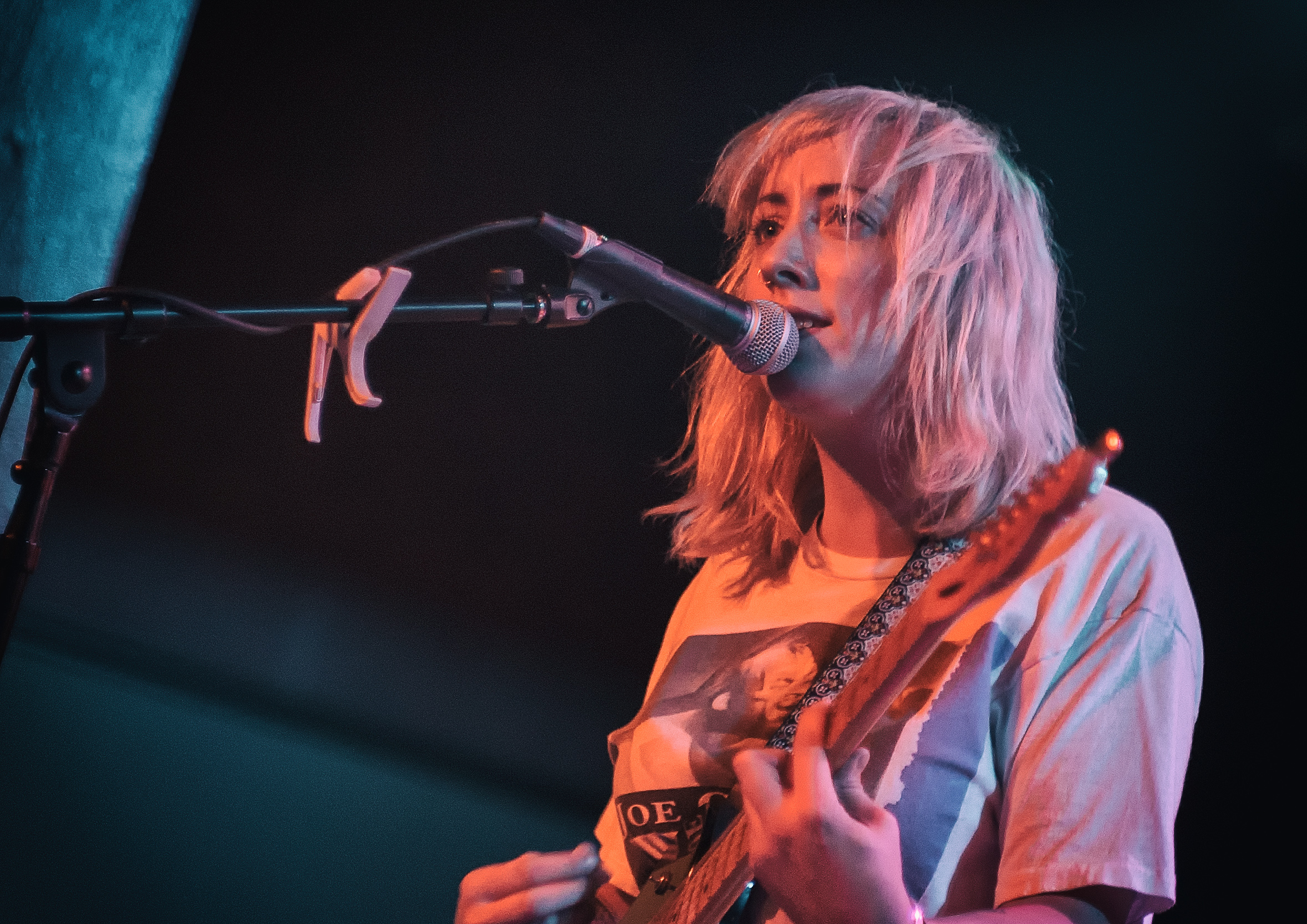
- Augusta Koch, frontwoman of Cayetana, in 2017.

Background information
- Origin: Philadelphia, Pennsylvania, U.S.
- Genres: Indie rock, pop punk, punk rock, emo
- Years active: 2011–2019
- Label: Tiny Engines
- Past members: Augusta Koch; Allegra Anka; Kelly Olsen

Cayetana were an American rock band from Philadelphia, Pennsylvania. The band was formed in 2011 by Augusta Koch on vocals and lead guitar, Kelly Olsen on drums, and Allegra Anka on bass. They released two studio albums, Nervous Like Me (2014), and New Kind of Normal (2017), as well as three EPs before breaking up in 2019.

== History ==
Kelly Olsen and Allegra Anka first met while going to college in New York, before moving back to their hometown of Philadelphia. They met Augusta Koch at a party in 2011, and bonded over their desire to be in a "girl band." They decided upon meeting that they would form a band, but none of them could play their instruments. Koch originally had to play with a borrowed guitar. Cayetana began performing music together in 2011. They self-released their first extended play, titled Cayetana EP, in 2012. In 2014, they were signed by the independent label Tiny Engines, and released a 7 inch titled Hot Dad Calendar in March of that year.

On September 9, 2014, Cayetana released their debut full-length album titled Nervous Like Me via Tiny Engines. The album was praised by Vice for Koch's "raggedy and distinct delivery." Two years later, Cayetana released an EP on Asian Man Records titled Tired Eyes. The EP was noted as being a "slow-burn" and a change of pace for the band. Later that year, Cayetana released a split on Poison City Records with Camp Cope.

In 2017, they released their second full-length New Kind of Normal, which was released by Plum Records.

In 2019, Cayetana announced that they would be breaking up, and they played their final show in Philadelphia on August 3, 2019. The band was praised as a "staple" of the rock music scene in Philadelphia. Koch later formed Gladie.

== Band members ==
- Augusta Koch (vocals, guitar)
- Allegra Anka (bass)
- Kelly Olsen (drums)

== Discography ==
Studio albums

- Nervous Like Me (2014, Tiny Engines)
- New Kind of Normal (2017, Plum Records)

EPs

- Cayetana EP (2012, self-released)
- Hot Dad Calendar (2014, Tiny Engines)
- Tired Eyes (2016, Asian Man)

Splits

- Cayetana/Camp Cope (2016, Poison City)

Compilations

- not what we meant by NEW KIND OF NORMAL (2020, self-released)
