= Georgia Maq =

Australian musician

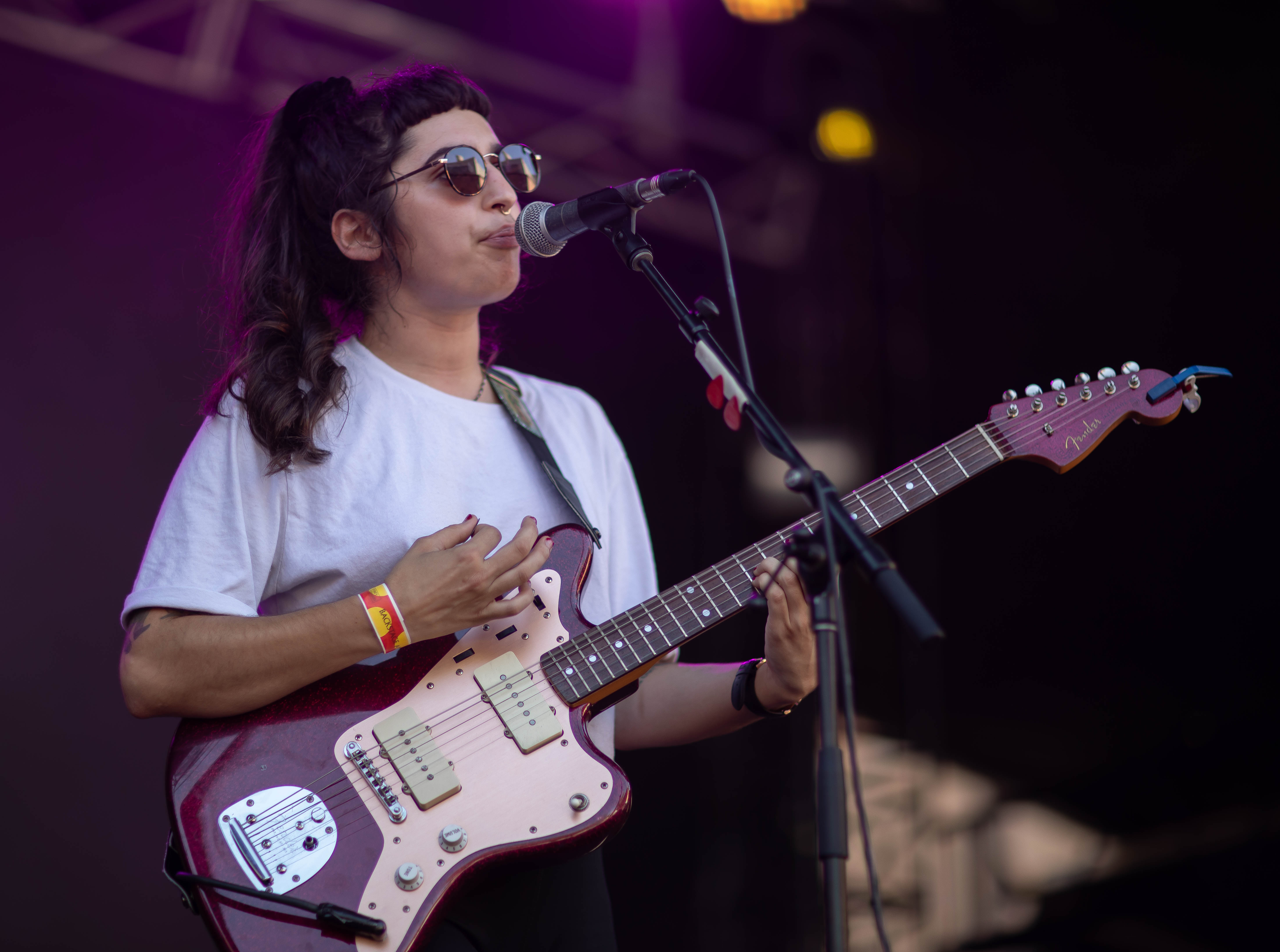
- Georgia Maq performing with Camp Cope at Laneway Festival in 2019

Background information
- Origin: Melbourne, Australia
- Genres: Indie rock, Punk rock
- Years active: 2015–present
- Formerly of: Camp Cope
- Father: Hugh McDonald

Georgia McDonald, better known as Georgia Maq, is an Australian musician who was formerly the lead singer of the indie rock band Camp Cope.

== History ==
Maq formed Camp Cope in 2015, when she recruited bandmates Sarah Thompson and Kelly-Dawn Hellmrich to flesh out solo material Maq was working on. The group released three studio albums before breaking up in 2023.

She was a member of the punk band Würst Nürse and sang on their first EP, Hot Hot Hot, released in 2018.

Maq released her debut solo studio album, Pleaser, in 2019. The album was produced by Katie Dey and Darcy Baylis.

In 2022 she released a live EP titled Live At The Sydney Opera House.

She had graduated as an enrolled nurse in 2015, just before the band took off, and delayed taking a graduate position to pursue music. During the COVID-19 pandemic, with concerts temporarily halted, she went back to nursing. Initially doing COVID testing, then administering vaccinations, and then finally taking up a graduate position.

She is the daughter of Australian musician Hugh McDonald of the folk-rock band Redgum.

She is of Greek heritage through her mother and was baptised Greek Orthodox.

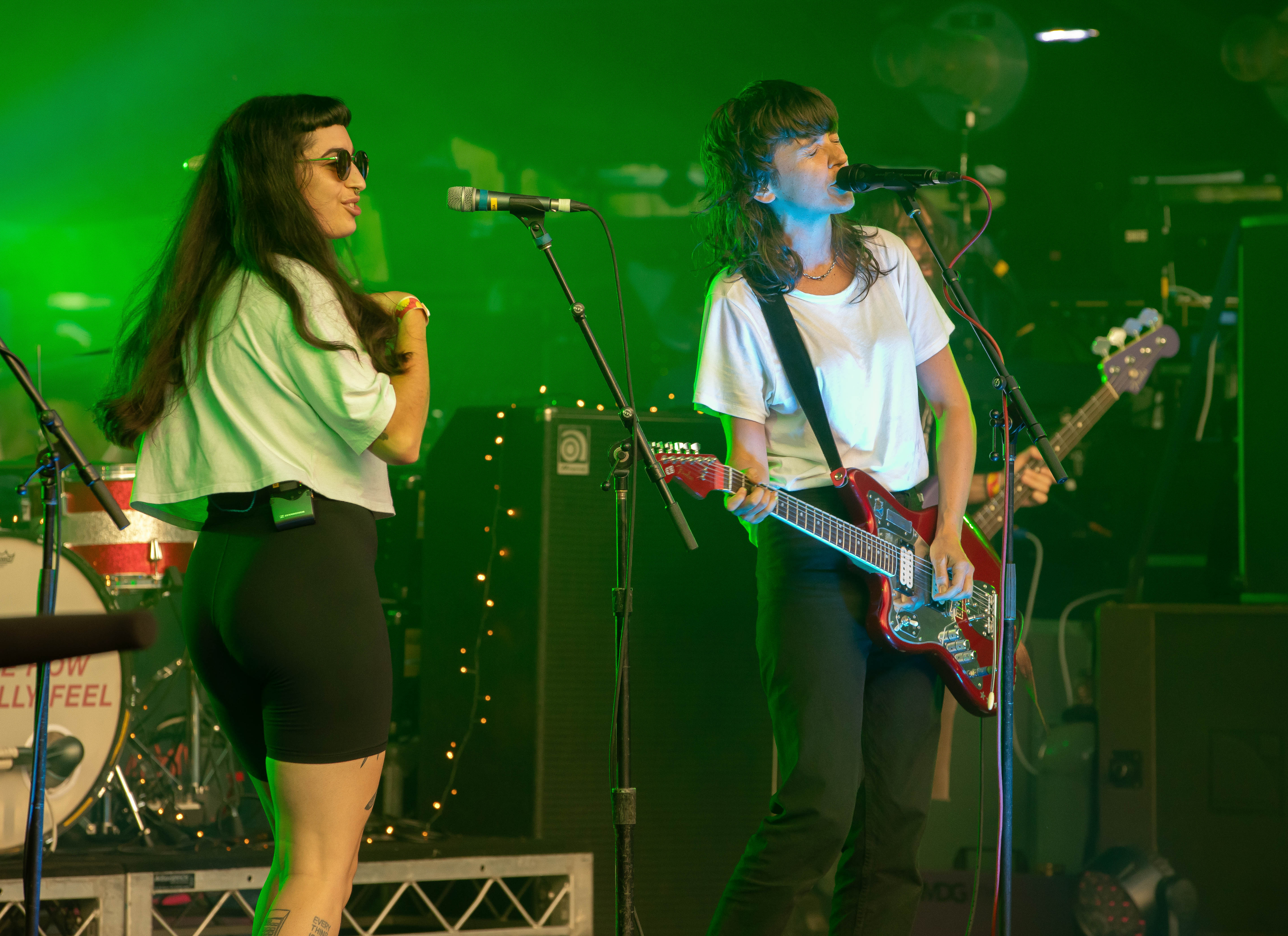
Maq onstage with Courtney Barnett at Laneway Festival in 2019

== Discography ==
=== Solo studio albums ===
Title	Album details
Pleaser	Released: 11 December 2019; Label: Run For Cover Records (RFC206), Poison City (PCR168)

=== Solo EP ===
Title	Album details
Live at Sydney Opera House	Released: 2 December 2022; Label: Self-released
God's Favourite	Released: 4 September 2025; Label: 1000 Rats

=== Studio albums with Camp Cope ===
Title	Album details
Camp Cope	Released: 22 April 2016; Label: Poison City Records (PCR120CD)
How to Socialise & Make Friends	Released: 2 March 2018; Label: Poison City (PCR150CD)
Running with the Hurricane	Released: 25 March 2022; Label: Poison City (PCR180CD)

=== EP with Würst Nürse ===
Title	Album details
Hot Hot Hot	Released: 8 June 2018; Label: Self-released
