= Embracing Me =

Single by Safia

from the album Internal
- Released: 10 July 2015
- Genre: Indie electronic
- Length: 3:51
- Label: Parlophone
- Songwriter(s): Ben Woolner-Kirkham, Michael Bell, Harry Sayers
- Producer(s): Safia

Safia singles chronology
"Counting Sheep" (2015)	"Embracing Me" (2015)	"Make Them Wheels Roll" (2016)

Music video
- "Embracing Me" on YouTube

"Embracing Me" is a song by Australian electronic music group Safia. It was released as the first single from their forthcoming debut studio album, Internal (2016).

The song was premiered on Triple J on July 2 and released on 10 July 2015 on iTunes.

SAFIA member Ben Woolner said, "at one stage it was going to be the single before 'You Are The One' so it's been around for a while." He continued, "If you've seen us live you've probably heard this song."

Remixes were released on 22 April 2016.

== Music video ==
A music video to accompany the release of "Embracing Me" was first released on YouTube on 20 July 2015.

The video was filmed in St Joseph's church in Gundaroo and revolves around a young Amish man and woman who are entirely fond of each other, but they're trapped in a community where any kind of non-platonic affection is seemingly frowned upon, especially by the preacher – who is also the woman's father, played by acclaimed Australian actor, David Roberts.

== Reception ==
Jessica Allard Morishita from Confront Magazine said; "[it’s] light-hearted and smooth, making it the a good match for your summer playlist. It contrasts with their previous single “Counting Sheep,” which is dark and edgy.

A staff writer at festivals of Australia said; “’Embracing Me' pairs intimate lyrical styling with crisp and snappy beat production, offering the new single that’s arguably one of SAFIA’s best yet.”

== Track listing ==
1 track single

1. "Embracing Me" (Apres Remix) – 3:51

Remixes

1. "Embracing Me" (Apres Remix) – 6:37
2. "Embracing Me" (Hayden James Remix) – 4:37
3. "Embracing Me" (SoulCircuit Remix) – 5:28
4. "Embracing Me" (Mazde Remix) – 3:25

== Charts ==
In Australia, “Embracing Me” debuted at number 69 on the ARIA singles chart for the week commencing 20 July 2015. The song also debuted at number 8 on ARIA Australian Artist chart.

=== Weekly charts ===
Chart (2015)	Peak position
Australian ARIA Singles Chart	69

== Certifications ==
Region	Certification	Certified units/sales
Australia (ARIA)	Gold	35,000^{‡}
^{‡} Sales+streaming figures based on certification alone.
