= Nervous Like Me =

Studio album by Cayetana
- Released: 26 August 2014
- Recorded: 2014
- Genre: Alternative rock
- Length: 30:26
- Label: Tiny Engines

Cayetana albums chronology
Hot Dad Calendar (2014)	Nervous Like Me (2014)

Professional ratings
Review scores
Source	Rating
Consequence of Sound	B+
AllMusic	4/5 stars

Nervous Like Me is the debut studio album by American rock band Cayetana, released in 2014.

== Track listing ==
No.	Title	Length
1.	"Serious Things Are Stupid"	2:28
2.	"Black Hills"	2:16
3.	"Dirty Laundry"	2:16
4.	"Animal"	2:21
5.	"Mountain Kids"	3:11
6.	"Madame B"	2:50
7.	"Scott Get The Van, I'm Moving"	2:46
8.	"Favorite Things"	2:41
9.	"Hot Dad Calendar"	3:14
10.	"Busy Brain"	2:44
11.	"South Philly"	3:39
Total length:		30:26

== Critical reception ==
Nervous Like Me was released to positive reviews. Philip Cosores of Consequence of Sound gave the album a B+ rating and praised the album as one of the best debut albums from a Philadelphia band.
