= Stay (Luca Brasi album) =

2018 album by Luca Brasi

Studio album by Luca Brasi
- Released: 22 June 2018
- Recorded: 2018
- Genres: Alternative rock, punk rock
- Length: 38:06
- Label: Cooking Vinyl
- Producers: Jimmy Balderston, Nic White, Darren Cordeux

Luca Brasi chronology
If This Is All We're Going to Be (2016)	Stay (2018)

Singles from Stay
- 1. "Got to Give" Released: 16 June 2017; 2. "Let it Slip" Released: 9 March 2018; 3. "Clothes I Slept In" Released: June 2018; 4. "Reeling" Released: November 2018

Stay is the fourth studio album by Australian rock band Luca Brasi, released on 22 June 2018 by Cooking Vinyl. It was produced by Jimmy Balderston and Nic White with assistance from Darren Cordeux.

== Background and promotion ==
The coordinates on the album cover, 42ºS 147ºE, are the coordinates for the state of Tasmania. Their first single from the album, "Got to Give", was released on 16 June 2017 with an accompanying music video for it following a month later. The band released the second single "Let it Slip" on 13 April 2018, with its corresponding music video releasing a month later. On 1 June, the band released their third single "Clothes I Slept In".

Shortly after the release of their single "Got to Give", they performed a national headline tour. The band performed a six-date national tour to promote album in August 2018. The band announced another national tour for 2019, this time for their single "The Clothes I Slept In". The tour is set to be the band's longest, spanning two months and twenty-one dates performing in regional hubs of all states.

== Critical reception ==
Professional ratings
Review scores
Source	Rating
Beat	8.5
Hysteria	7/10
KillYourStereo	65/100
Wall of Sound	6/10

Stay received positive reviews. Wall of Sound in a 6/10 review said: "If you love the Australian indie rock sounds favoured by Triple J at the moment, this album is for you. It's emotive, uncomplicated and consistent. If you like your rock heavier, then maybe give it a miss." Rating the album 8.5/10, Alexander Crowden of Beat said: "With Stay, Luca Brasi emerge as one of the country’s best rock bands, period." Hysteria rated the album 7/10 and praised vocalist Tyler Richardson saying: "As a vocalist, Richardson is at the top of his game on Stay. He carries the same raw bite and thick Tassie accent as is signature to Luca Brasi, but LP4 presents him biting with more passion than punkiness." Jonty Cornford of KillYourStereo scored the album 65/100 stating: "Given their track record, this isn’t so much a dip in quality as it is a gentle leaning back on the work that they’ve done to get where they are today."

== Track listing ==
Track listing adapted from AllMusic.

No.	Title	Length
1.	"Stay"	1:36
2.	"Let it Slip"	3:14
3.	"The In-Between"	3:02
4.	"Reeling"	2:48
5.	"Never Better"	4:01
6.	"Got to Give"	3:34
7.	"Time Flew"	3:05
8.	"Clothes I Slept In"	3:38
9.	"Collisions"	3:06
10.	"Bastard"	3:33
11.	"The Calm and the Ease"	6:29
Total length:		38:06

== Personnel ==
Distributed by Sony Music Australia.

Luca Brasi

- Tyler Richardson – lead vocals, bass
- Thomas Busby – lead guitar, backing vocals
- Patrick Marshall – rhythm guitar, vocals
- Danny Flood – drums

Production

- Jimmy Balderston – producer
- Nic White – producer
- Darren Cordeux – co-producer
- Jimmy Balderston – engineering
- Jason Livermore – mixing, mastering

== Charts ==
Chart (2018)	Peak position
Australian Albums (ARIA)	10

== Release history ==
Region	Date	Label	Format	Catalog
Australia	22 June 2018	Cooking Vinyl	compact disc, long play, digital download	CVLP076
