= Running with the Hurricane =

Studio album by Camp Cope
- Released: 25 March 2022
- Studio: Sing Sing Recording Studios
- Label: Poison City Records
- Producer: Anna Laverty & Georgia McDonald

Camp Cope chronology
How to Socialise & Make Friends (2018)	Running with the Hurricane (2022)

Singles from Running with the Hurricane
- 1. "Blue" Released: 8 November 2021; 2. "Running with the Hurricane" Released: 21 January 2022; 3. "Jealous" Released: 18 March 2022

Running with the Hurricane is the third and final studio album by Australian alternative rock trio Camp Cope. The album was announced in January 2020 and released on 25 March 2022 through Poison City Records. It debuted and peaked at number 11 on the ARIA Charts.

The album was nominated for the 2022 Australian Music Prize. At the AIR Awards of 2023, the album was nominated for Best Independent Rock Album or EP.

== Reception ==
Professional ratings
Review scores
Source	Rating
Rolling Stone	3.5/5 stars
NME	4/5 stars
AllMusic	4/5 stars

Overall reception to Running With the Hurricane was positive. At Metacritic, which assigns a normalized rating out of 100 to reviews from professional publications, the album received an average score of 80, based on 11 reviews.

Kat Bouza from Rolling Stone said the album "finds the group embracing a gentler, more introspective approach" that is an "expansion of the groundwork previously laid by the band rather than a complete reinvention."

Cat Woods from NME observed that the trio abandoned "their indie punk beginnings" but that the album "offers songs more mature but no less magnificent" than the group's previous work.

Timothy Monger from AllMusic said Hurricane "feels like a calm exhalation from a band who have metaphorically passed through a storm and learned a great deal in the process," noting the songs have a "relaxed, lived-in feeling to them."

== Track listing ==
Running with the Hurricane track listing
No.	Title	Length
1.	"Caroline"	3:59
2.	"Running with the Hurricane"	4:15
3.	"One Wink At a Time"	3:29
4.	"Blue"	3:09
5.	"The Screaming Planet"	4:02
6.	"Love Like You Do"	3:25
7.	"Jealous"	3:36
8.	"The Mountain"	3:32
9.	"Say the Line"	3:46
10.	"Sing Your Heart Out"	3:54

== Charts ==
Chart (2022)	Peak position
Australian Albums (ARIA)	11

== Release history ==
Region	Date	Format	Edition(s)	Label	Catalogue
Australia	25 March 2022	CD; LP; digital download; streaming	Standard	Poison City Records	PCR180
North America	25 March 2022	CD; LP; digital download; streaming	Standard/ Limited LP	Run for Cover	RFC232
