= Body Type =

Australian rock band

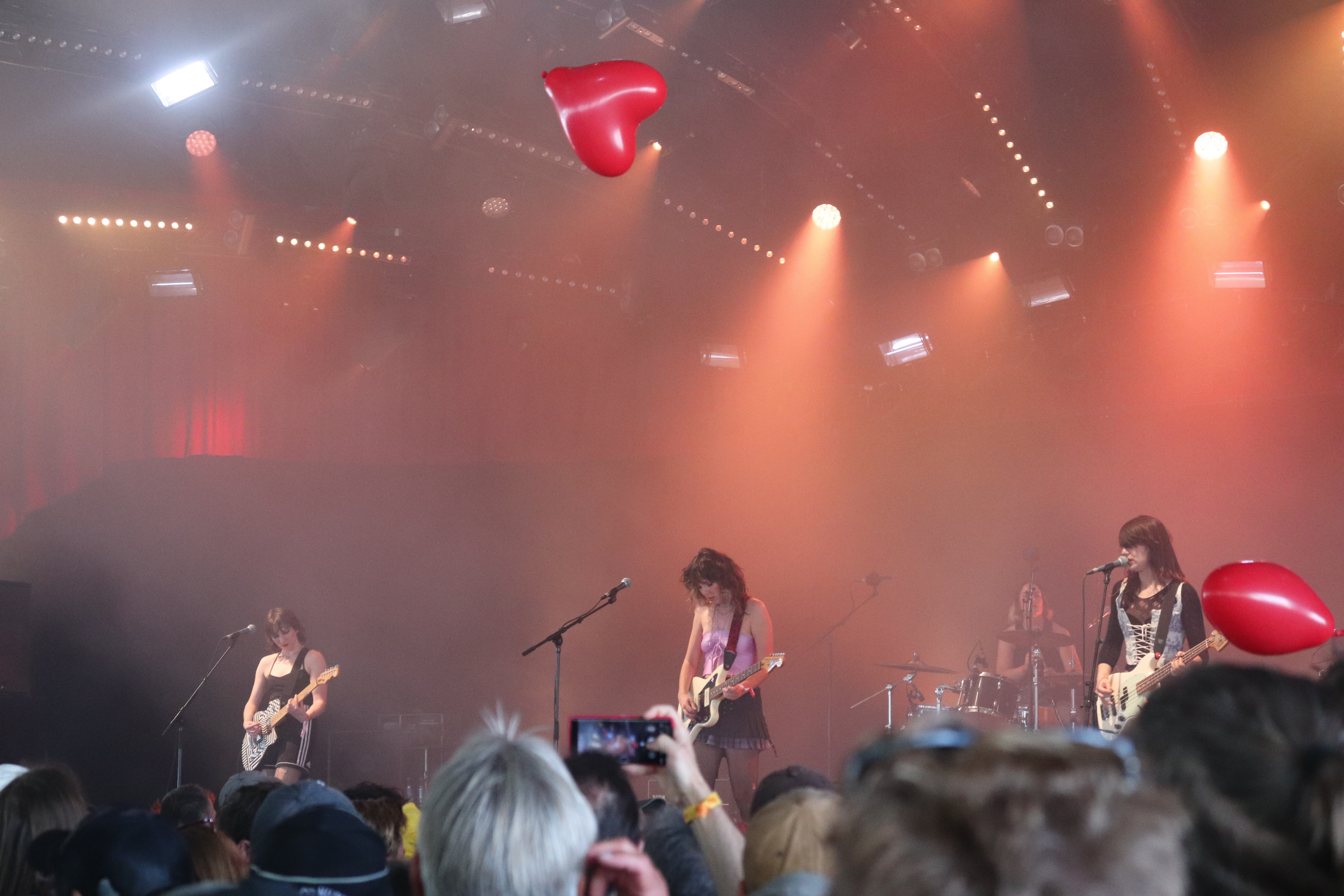
- Body Type performing at Roskilde Festival 2023

Background information
- Origin: Sydney, New South Wales, Australia
- Genres: Post-punk, garage rock
- Years active: 2016–present
- Labels: Partisan; Poison City; P(doom)
- Members: Annabel Blackman; Cecil Coleman; Sophie McComish; Georgia Wilkinson-Derums
- Website: www.bodytypeband.com

Body Type is an Australian rock band formed in Sydney, New South Wales. The group consists of Sophie McComish, Annabel Blackman, Georgia Wilkinson-Derums, and Cecil Coleman. After two early extended plays, they released their debut album, Everything Is Dangerous but Nothing's Surprising in May 2022, followed by Expired Candy in June 2023. Their third and most recent album, Tally, was released in late July 2026.

== History ==
=== 2016–2019: Early singles, Body Type, and EP2 ===
Body Type was formed in Sydney, New South Wales, Australia as an all-female rock group consisting of Sophie McComish, Annabel Blackman, Georgia Wilkinson-Derums, and Cecil Coleman. The band's first singles were "2 6 4" and "Ludlow", released in November 2016. These were followed by "Silver" in August 2017, and in 2018, "Arrow" and "Palms" were released in April and September, respectively. "Palms" became the lead single for the band's debut extended play, the self-titled Body Type, which was released on 19 October 2018 through Partisan Records. The EP featured a new version of "Ludlow", titled "Ludlow (Do You Believe In Karma?)". A music video for the reimagination was also released on the same day as the EP.

Following their debut EP, Body Type began working on a follow-up. On 4 March 2019, EP2 was announced for release on 3 May 2019. The lead single, along with an accompanying music video, titled "Stingray", was released on the same day. The song received praise, with Dan Condon of Double J calling it their best work yet. "Stingray" was followed by "Free To Air" and its music video on 8 April. A third and final single, "Uma", was released on 2 May, one day before the release of EP2. "Uma" also had an accompanying music video. Like Body Type, EP2 was released through Partisan Records. EP2 was included in Stereogum's list of the best EPs of 2019.

=== 2022–present: Everything Is Dangerous... and Expired Candy ===
Body Type announced the release of their debut album, Everything Is Dangerous but Nothing's Surprising, on 10 February 2022, alongside the release of the album's first single: "Sex & Rage". On the same day, they also announced that they had departed Partisan Records and signed with the Melbourne-based independent record label Poison City Records. The album's single, "The Charm", was released on 28 April 2022. The album was released on 20 May 2022 via Poison City Records.

In February 2023, Body Type released "Miss the World", the first single from the band's second studio album, Expired Candy, released later that year. In March, they released the album's second single "Holding On".

=== 2025–present: Tally ===
On 8 April 2026, it was announced that the band had signed to P(doom) Records, a label owned by King Gizzard & the Lizard Wizard, in the U.S., the UK, and Europe. With the announcement, they released the single "And What Else?" Body Type recorded their third album in early 2025 at Velveteen Laboratory Studios in Los Angeles with musician and producer Stella Mozgawa, known for their work with Courtney Barnett, Kim Gordon, and Warpaint. A week after performing at the White Bay Power Station in Sydney—their largest headlining show in Australia to date—Body Type released another single, "Mulberry", and officially announced their third album, entitled Tally. After the third single, "Sick Bag", on 16 June, Tally was released on 24 July 2026 via Poison City and P(doom) Records. Starting in October, the band are slated to tour as a support act for Courtney Barnett in the UK and Europe.

== Discography ==
=== Albums ===
Title	Album details	Peak chart positions
Title	Album details	AUS
Everything Is Dangerous but Nothing's Surprising	Released: 20 May 2022; Label: Poison City	—
Expired Candy	Released: 2 June 2023; Label: Poison City	—
Tally	Released: 24 July 2026; Labels: Poison City, P(doom)	42

=== Extended plays ===
Title	EP details
Body Type	Released: 19 October 2018; Label: Partisan
EP2	Released: 3 May 2019; Label: Partisan

== Awards and nominations ==
=== AIR Awards ===
The Australian Independent Record Awards (commonly known informally as AIR Awards) is an annual awards night to recognise, promote and celebrate the success of Australia's Independent Music sector.

Year	Nominee / work	Award	Result	Ref.
2023	Everything Is Dangerous but Nothing's Surprising	Best Independent Punk Album or EP	Nominated	

=== Australian Music Prize ===
The Australian Music Prize (the AMP) is an annual award of $30,000 given to an Australian band or solo artist in recognition of the merit of an album released during the year of award. It exists to discover, reward and promote new Australian music of excellence.

Year	Nominee / work	Award	Result	Ref.
2022	Everything Is Dangerous but Nothing's Surprising	Australian Music Prize	Nominated	

=== National Live Music Awards ===
The National Live Music Awards (NLMAs) commenced in 2016 to recognise contributions to the live music industry in Australia.

Year	Nominee / work	Award	Result	Ref.
2023	Sophie McComish (Body Type)	Best Live Guitarist	Nominated	
2023	Body Type	Best Live Act	Nominated	
