= Camp Cope (album) =

Studio album by Camp Cope
- Released: 22 April 2016
- Studios: Holes & Corners, Melbourne
- Genre: Alternative rock
- Length: 36:47
- Label: Poison City
- Producer: Sam Johnson

Camp Cope chronology
Camp Cope (2016)	How to Socialise & Make Friends (2018)

Singles from Camp Cope
- 1. "Lost (Season One)" Released: 22 January 2016; 2. "Jet Fuel Can't Melt Steel Beams" Released: 20 March 2016; 3. "Done" Released: 10 June 2016

Camp Cope is the debut studio album by Australian alternative rock trio Camp Cope. The album was released on 22 April 2016 through Poison City Records and debuted and peaked at number 36 on the ARIA Charts. It was nominated for the Australian Music Prize and Australian Album of the Year at the J Awards of 2016.

== Background ==
Camp Cope was released by the Australian alternative rock group of the same name on 22 April 2016 via the independent label, Poison City. The power trio had formed in 2015 in Melbourne by Kelly-Dawn Hellmrich on bass guitar, Georgia "Georgia Maq" McDonald on lead vocals and guitar and Sarah "Thomo" Thompson on drums. The album peaked at No. 36 on the ARIA Albums chart. It was produced by Sam Johnson at Holes & Corners Studios, Melbourne.

Camp Cope was nominated for the Australian Music Prize and Australian Album of the Year at the J Awards of 2016.

== Track listing ==
All tracks are written by Kelly-Dawn Hellmrich, Georgia McDonald and Sarah Thompson, unless otherwise indicated

Camp Cope Poison City Records (PCR120CD)
No.	Title	Length
1.	"Done"	4:47
2.	"Flesh & Electricity"	3:57
3.	"West Side Story"	5:32
4.	"Lost (Season One)" (McDonald)	3:47
5.	"Jet Fuel Can't Melt Steel Beams"	4:05
6.	"Trepidation"	3:33
7.	"Stove Lighter"	4:20
8.	"Song for Charlie" (McDonald)	6:46
Total length:		36:47

== Charts ==
Chart (2016)	Peak position
Australian Albums (ARIA)	36

== Release history ==
Region	Date	Format	Edition(s)	Label	Catalogue
Australia	22 April 2016	CD; LP; CS; digital download; streaming	Standard	Poison City Records	PCR120CD
North America	2017	CD; LP; CS; digital download; streaming	Standard	Run for Cover	RFC165
Australia	19 March 2021	Limited LP (various colours)	Limited	Run for Cover	PCR120
