= How to Socialise & Make Friends =

Studio album by Camp Cope
- Released: 2 March 2018
- Length: 38:10
- Label: Poison City

Camp Cope chronology
Camp Cope (2016)	How to Socialise & Make Friends (2018)	Running with the Hurricane (2022)

Singles from How to Socialise & Make Friends
- 1. "The Opener" Released: 16 November 2017; 2. "How to Socialise and Make Friends" Released: January 2018

How to Socialise & Make Friends is the second studio album by Australian alternative rock trio Camp Cope. The album was released on 2 March 2018 through Poison City Records and debuted and peaked at number 6 on the ARIA Charts.

At the Music Victoria Awards of 2018, the album was nominated for Best Rock/Punk Album and Best Album, while the trio won Best Band at the same awards ceremony. At the AIR Awards of 2019, the album was nominated for Best Independent Hard Rock, Heavy or Punk Album and Australian Album of the Year at the J Awards of 2018.

== Reception ==
Professional ratings
Review scores
Source	Rating
AllMusic	4/5 stars
Pitchfork	7.8/10

Timothy Monger from AllMusic said "As with their debut, the production is unfussy, bordering on lo-fi, and focused on the live unfiltered elements of the three musicians playing in a room together. McDonald's songwriting is melodic and bittersweet, more often than not tumbling into catharsis and wounded outrage midway through. There's an intense magnetism to her vocals as she wields her emotional sword, channeling vulnerability and danger into something unpredictable and uncomfortably human, especially on standouts like 'The Opener', 'Anna' and 'Sagan-Indiana'. In sharing rather than preaching their experiences, Camp Cope offer something personally therapeutic that also challenges listeners."

== Track listing ==
How to Socialise & Make Friends track listing
No.	Title	Length
1.	"The Opener"	3:40
2.	"How to Socialise and Make Friends"	3:14
3.	"The Face of God"	3:50
4.	"Anna"	5:52
5.	"Sagan-Indiana"	3:55
6.	"The Omen"	3:58
7.	"Animal and Real"	3:47
8.	"UFO Lighter"	4:31
9.	"I've Got You"	5:23
Total length:		38:10

== Charts ==
Chart (2018)	Peak position
Australian Albums (ARIA)	6

== Release history ==
Region	Date	Format	Edition(s)	Label	Catalogue
Australia	2 March 2018	CD; LP; CS; digital download; streaming	Standard	Poison City Records	PCR150CD
North America	2 March 2018	CD; LP; CS; digital download; streaming	Standard/ Limited LP	Run for Cover	RFC173
