= J Awards of 2016 =

Australian music awards

- Date: 17 November 2016
- Venue: Australia
- Website: abc.net.au/triplej

The J Award of 2016 is the twelfth annual J Awards, established by the Australian Broadcasting Corporation's youth-focused radio station Triple J. The announcement comes at the culmination of Ausmusic Month (November). For the third year, four awards were presented; Australian Album of the Year, Double J Artist of the Year, Australian Music Video of the Year and Unearthed Artist of the Year.

The eligible period took place between November 2015 and October 2016. The winners were announced live on air on Triple J on Tuesday 17 November 2016.

== Awards ==
=== Australian Album of the Year ===
Artist	Album Title	Result
D.D Dumbo	Utopia Defeated	Won
The Avalanches	Wildflower	Nominated
Big Scary	Animal	Nominated
Camp Cope	Camp Cope	Nominated
Flume	Skin	Nominated
Julia Jacklin	Don't Let the Kids Win	Nominated
Montaigne	Glorious Heights	Nominated
SAFIA	Internal	Nominated
Sticky Fingers	Westway (The Glitter & the Slums)	Nominated
Violent Soho	WACO	Nominated

=== Double J Artist of the Year ===
Artist	Result
King Gizzard & the Lizard Wizard	Won
The Drones	Nominated
Jordan Rakei	Nominated
Ngaiire	Nominated
Teeth & Tongue	Nominated

=== Australian Video of the Year ===
Director	Artist and Song	Result
Danny Cohen and Jason Galea	King Gizzard & the Lizard Wizard - "People-Vultures"	Won
Sunny Leunig	Courtney Barnett - "Elevator Operator"	Nominated
Jim Elson	D.D Dumbo - "Satan"	Nominated
Tom Noakes	Tigerilla featuring Gill Bates - "Tulips"	Nominated
Alex Smith	Olympia - "Smoke Signals"	Nominated

=== Unearthed Artist of the Year ===
Artist	Result
Tash Sultana	Won
Alex Lahey	Nominated
Gretta Ray	Nominated
Julia Jacklin	Nominated
Kuren	Nominated
