= Paranoia, Ghosts & Other Sounds =

Single by Safia
- Released: 11 April 2014
- Genre: Indie electronic
- Length: 4:25
- Label: SAFIA
- Songwriters: Ben Woolner-Kirkham, Micheal Bell, Harry Sayers
- Producer: SAFIA

Safia singles chronology
| "Listen to Soul, Listen to Blues" (2013) | "Paranoia, Ghosts & Other Sounds" (2014) | "You Are the One" (2014) |

Music video
- "Paranoia, Ghosts & Other Sounds" on YouTube

"Paranoia, Ghosts & Other Sounds" is a song by Australian electronic music group Safia. It was released as the group's second single on 11 April 2014.

In an interview with Spook Magazine in June 2014, lead singer Ben Woolner said "Paranoia, Ghosts & Other Sounds" 'just came to him' when he was playing the piano. He added "I got the first two lines, and the production had been weird and wonky already, so I explored this, and built the song around the theme of paranoia inside someone’s mind, or life and looked at the whole release like that, ensuring that there was still pop sensibility there but also putting cute and creepy sounds in there too. We extended that with the film clip too, and our friend designed the little bear in it, and animated."

At the 2014 AIR Awards, the song was nominated for 'Best Independent Dance, Electronica or Club Single', losing to "High" by Peking Duk.

The song reached number 1 on the Hype Machine chart. In the annual Triple J Hottest 100 countdown in January 2015, the song came in at number 96.

== Music video ==
A music video to accompany the release of "Paranoia, Ghosts & Other Sounds" was first released on YouTube on 18 April 2014.

Lucy Dayman from ToneDeaf said; "Animation and visual effects bring the colourful artworks of a shady graffiti artist to life in the video. Like the song, the video builds in intensity as the artwork becomes more threatening. This is the directorial debut of Jaeger John Vallejera, who directed the clip alongside Jimmy Ennett. Vallejera also animated the video, each frame drawn by hand."

The video won 'Best music video' at the Australian Independent Music Video Awards of 2014.

== Critical reception ==
Michael Cragg from The Guardian described the song as a "soupy blend of digital soul and low slung R&B". Cragg said "With layers of splintered, treated vocals interrupting the song's mid-paced flow for the first half, it really gets going around the 2:20 mark when a choir of processed vocals emerge out of nowhere and the whole track morphs into what sounds like a robotic symphony."

Hugh McClure from Indie Shuffle said "Paranoia, Ghosts & Other Sounds showcases the band's unique style, and really solidifies them as an act to watch," adding "the production here is excellent, with a smooth, modern R&B jam created through layers of synth and shadowy beats, paving the way for Ben Woolner's smoldering vocals to take over."
