= Make Them Wheels Roll =

Single by Safia

from the album Internal
- Released: 4 March 2016
- Genre: Indietronica
- Length: 4:05
- Label: Parlophone
- Songwriters: Ben Woolner-Kirkham, Micheal Bell, Harry Sayers
- Producer: Safia

Safia singles chronology
"Embracing Me" (2015)	"Make Them Wheels Roll" (2016)	"Over You" (2016)

Music video
- "Make Them Wheels Roll" on YouTube

"Make Them Wheels Roll" is a song by Australian electronic music group Safia. It was released as the second single from their debut studio album, Internal (2016).

The song premiered on Triple J on 4 March 2016. Ben Woolner said the song is about "How you're encouraged to be part of society to keep things going." He added, "it's definitely up there with one of the favourite tracks we've done." The song was released on 4 March 2016, ahead of being incorporated into the official soundtrack album for MTV's Scream Season 2, appearing throughout the season, and re-released with Scream: Music from Season Two on 26 July 2016, under Island Records.

== Music video ==
The music video for "Make Them Wheels Roll" was released on YouTube on 19 April 2016. It was directed by Jimmy Ennett.

== Critical reception ==
Zanda Wilson from Music Feeds said; "'Make Them Wheels Roll' is everything you’ve come to expect and love from Ben and the boys; just the right amount of catchy pop, mixed in with effortless amounts of funk and sinfully delicious soul."

== Charts ==
In Australia, "Make Them Wheels Roll" debuted at number 77 on the ARIA singles chart for the week commencing 14 March 2016, later peaking at number 45 and becoming the band's first top 50 song as a solo act. The song also debuted at number 13 on ARIA Australian Artist chart.

=== Weekly charts ===
Chart (2016)	Peak position
Australia (ARIA)	45

== Certifications ==
Region	Certification	Certified units/sales
Australia (ARIA)	Gold	35,000^{‡}
New Zealand (RMNZ)	Gold	15,000^{‡}
^{‡} Sales+streaming figures based on certification alone.
