= Listen to Soul, Listen to Blues =

Single by Safia
- Released: 18 December 2013
- Genre: Indietronica
- Length: 3:51
- Label: SAFIA
- Songwriters: Ben Woolner-Kirkham, Micheal Bell, Harry Sayers
- Producer: Safia

Safia singles chronology
"Listen to Soul, Listen to Blues" (2013)	"Paranoia, Ghosts & Other Sounds" (2014)

Music video
- "Listen to Soul, Listen to Blues" on YouTube

"Listen to Soul, Listen to Blues" is the debut single by Australian electronic music group Safia. It first appeared on the band's SoundCloud, and was officially released on iTunes in December 2013.

In the annual Triple J Hottest 100 countdown in January 2014, the song came in at number 76.

== Background ==
In March 2013, Safia won a competition to perform at the nationwide Groovin' the Moo festival. The group released three free download tracks on their SoundCloud page, "Stretched and Faded", "Mercury" and "Listen to Soul, Listen to Blues". "Listen to Soul, Listen to Blues" received significant airplay on Triple J and became the band's first iTunes release in December 2013.

== Music video ==
A music video to accompany the release of "Listen to Soul, Listen to Blues" was first released on YouTube on 6 July 2013. The video was directed by Jimmy Ennett.

== Critical reception ==
Hannah Galvin from Purple Sneakers said: "Through the dreamy vocals accompanied by simplistic piano and a whirlwind of beats that is soon harpooned by a wave of dubstep, the contrasting elements combined deliver a soulful slow jam by the electronic trio."

== Track listing ==
1-track single

1. "Listen To Soul, Listen To Blues" - 3:51

remixes

1. "Listen To Soul, Listen To Blues" (Indian Summer Remix)
1. "Listen To Soul, Listen To Blues" (Spenda C Remix)
2. "Listen To Soul, Listen To Blues" (Leaderboy Remix)
3. "Listen To Soul, Listen To Blues" (Pigeon Remix)

== Charts ==
Chart (2013)	Peak position
Australia (ARIA)	99
Australian Independent Singles (AIR)	8

== Certifications ==
Certifications for "Listen to Soul, Listen to Blues"
Region	Certification	Certified units/sales
Australia (ARIA)	Platinum	70,000^{‡}
^{‡} Sales+streaming figures based on certification alone.
