= Over You (Safia song) =

Single by Safia

from the album Internal
- Released: 1 July 2016
- Genre: Indietronica
- Length: 3:07
- Label: Parlophone
- Songwriter(s): Ben Woolner, Michael Bell, Harry Sayers, Tom Fuller
- Producer(s): Safia, Tom Fuller

Safia singles chronology
"Make Them Wheels Roll" (2016)	"Over You" (2016)	"My Love Is Gone" (2016)

Music video
- "Over You" on YouTube

"Over You" is a song by Australian electronic music group Safia. It was released as the third single alongside the pre-order of their forthcoming debut studio album, Internal (2016). The track was premiered on the Triple J breakfast show on 30 June and sees the group muse over a past love.

== Music video ==
The music video for "Over You" was released on YouTube on 17 August 2016. It was directed by Markus Hofko. It is the first Safia video not to be directed by an Australian. The clip focuses on the haunting effects that a breakup can bring, when you still feel the other person’s presence long after they’ve left your life, the surreal and at times eerie clip is a beautifully shot glimpse into the desperation of needing to get over someone.

== Critical reception ==
Nick Kelly from Project U described the song as "a big ball of stomping fun."

== Charts ==
In Australia, "Over You" debuted at number 80 on the ARIA singles chart for the week commencing 11 July 2016, peaking at number 63 the following week.

=== Weekly charts ===
Chart (2016)	Peak position
Australia (ARIA)	63
Australian Artist Chart (ARIA)	10
