= Story's Start or End =

Studio album by Safia
- Released: 9 August 2019
- Genre: Electronic
- Length: 52:01
- Label: Parlophone; Warner Music Australia
- Producer: Safia

Safia chronology
Internal (2016)	Story's Start or End (2019)	A Lover's Guide to a Lucid Dream (2023)

Singles from Story's Start or End
- 1. "Cellophane Rainbow" Released: 13 October 2017; 2. "Starlight" Released: 21 September 2018; 3. "Resolution" Released: 8 May 2019; 4. "Think We're Not Alone" Released: 22 May 2019; 5. "Runaway" Released: 26 July 2019

Story's Start or End is the second studio album by Australian electronica indie pop band, Safia, released on 9 August 2019.

== Background ==
In an interview, band member Ben told Stoney Roads "We started writing this record almost immediately after the release of our first album. Over the course of two and a half year's we experimented, tinkered and wrote countless songs. As time went on everything began to take shape but even then, we continued to work on the songs right up until the very last deadline. I think we did over 10 masters of certain tracks to make sure they were just right." adding "This record is built around journey, growth and understanding. We wanted there to be a human story at its core whilst still having expansive ideas surrounding it."

The album was supported with a 9-day Australian national tour, commencing in Canberra on 24 August and concluding in Brisbane on 21 September.

== Critical reception ==
Professional ratings
Review scores
Source	Rating
Forte Magazine	4.5/5 stars

Tammy Walters from Forte Magazine gave the album 4.5 out of 5 saying; "Safia uses their second album to distinguish their sound and showcase their maturing song writing, embracing simplicity and blending textures that will translate incredibly in their live shows."

Ryan Middleton from Magnetic Mag said "The new album builds on what they created in 2016, keeping some of that summery Australian electronic sound that has permeated world music" adding "[the album] never loses the synth-heavy electronic sound they have become known for."

== Track listing ==
1. "Ivory Lullaby" – 4:10
2. "Starlight" – 4:02
3. "Think We're Not Alone" – 4:03
4. "Think About You" – 3:29
5. "Resolution" – 4:01
6. "White Lies" – 3:30
7. "Better Off Alone" – 3:44
8. "Runaway" – 3:51
9. "Animal at Most" – 3:02
10. "Vagabonds" – 4:25
11. "Maybe You'll Love Again" – 4:37
12. "Cellophane Rainbow" – 4:39
13. "Story's Start or End" – 4:28

== Charts ==
Chart performance for Story's Start or End
Chart (2019)	Peak position
Australian Albums (ARIA)	13

== Release history ==
Release history and formats for Story's Start or End
Region	Date	Format	Label	Catalogue
Australia	9 August 2019	Digital download, streaming CD, vinyl	Parlophone, Warner Music Australia	5419704938 / 5419704940
