= You Are the One (Safia song) =

Single by Safia
- Released: 16 September 2014
- Genre: Indietronica
- Length: 3:46
- Label: SAFIA
- Songwriters: Ben Woolner-Kirkham, Micheal Bell, Harry Sayers

Safia singles chronology
"Paranoia, Ghosts & Other Sounds" (2014)	"You Are the One" (2014)	"Take Me Over" (2014)

Music video
- "You Are the One" on YouTube

"You Are the One" is a song by Australian electronic music group Safia. It premiered on 12 September and was released as a single the 16 September 2014. It received international attention in February 2015 following a Facebook post by the band after seeing similarities with the video clip for Ariana Grande's "One Last Time".

== Music video ==
The music video was released on 24 September 2014 and was directed by Jimmy Ennett from Crux Media.

== Reviews ==
A staff writer at The Music AU said it “boasts their trademark harmonies, emotive vocals and melodic electronic beats”

Lauren from Stoney Roads said "It opens with a vocals-only melody that oozes with a rich, emotional sensitivity. The atmosphere builds as the synth and airy vocal layers stagger their way in - but the bluesy ballad stops right there. The beats drops. The funk begins. And funky, it is. The groovy melody is seriously lush, with crooner Ben Woolner showing off an impressive falsetto and a sensual, husky voice. Synth bleeps and bloops fill the soundscape, creating a sort of futuristic pop-r&b tone."

== Ariana Grande controversy ==
Following the release of the music video for Ariana Grande's song "One Last Time", directed by Max Landis in February 2015, Safia took to their Facebook page saying; "This might just be coincidence but to us it looks like either the people at Ariana Grande's label or the film maker have seen our clip for 'You Are The One' & reworked the concept a little bit and then straight up stolen and copied some bits...(Especially the end!)" Following the post, Safia was attacked by Ariana Grande fans on Twitter. Safia lead singer Ben Woolner told Sydney Morning Herald, "We just got the die-hard fans flooding in now with all their death threats. We're a real pop star now." And "It's gone really crazy, I've never been so scared of 13-year-old girls before."

Three days later, Safia posted on Facebook "really weird 72 hours and things have escalated very quickly regarding the Ariana Grande video situation... while we do find an uncanny similarity in certain parts of the two clips, there's no way of ever proving whether Ariana's clip was influenced by 'You Are The One' and it genuinely may have just been a coincidence. We're not after Ariana, Max or their label either we were simply voicing our concerns in what is sometimes a common occurrence in the music industry". Despite acknowledging similarities between the two videos, Landis denied that his ideas are stolen from them.

== Charts ==
Chart (2014)	Peak position
Australian Indie Singles Chart	9
