= Safia (band) =

Australian electronic band

- Origin: Canberra, ACT, Australia
- Genres: Electronic, indie pop
- Years active: 2009–present
- Labels: SAFIA (2012–present); Parlophone (2015–present)
- Members: Ben Woolner; Michael Bell; Harry Sayers

Safia is an Australian electronica and indie pop band formed in Canberra. They have released three studio albums.

== Career ==
Safia won the Groovin' the Moo competition in 2012. The band says the name comes from a song they wrote called "Sapphire", but it does not mean anything. The band have since found out that safia means serenity in Arabic.

The band have cited artists like Purity Ring, Major Lazer, Feed Me, Chet Faker, Disclosure and James Blake as influences.

In 2014, they were featured on Peking Duk's ARIA top 10 single, "Take Me Over".

Also in 2014, lead singer Ben Woolner appeared as feature artist on the Indian Summer single "Aged Care" under the pseudonym 'Benjamin Joseph'. The band opened for Twenty One Pilots during their 2017 Emotional Roadshow Tour Pacific Leg which started in Wellington, New Zealand.

On 30 June 2016, the band announced the title of its debut album, Internal, which was released on 9 September 2016 and peaked at number 2 on the ARIA Charts. On 13 October 2017, Safia released "Cellophane Rainbow".

In 2018, they released "Freakin' Out", which was the first track they wrote after their album Internal.

The band released their second album, Story's Start or End in September 2019. The album peaked at number 13 on the ARIA charts.

In October 2022, the band released "Falling Down", the first release since their second album Story's Start or End in 2019.

In August 2023, the band announced the forthcoming release of A Lover's Guide to a Lucid Dream and released its fourth single, "Float".

== Band members ==
- Ben Woolner (also uses the pseudonym "Benjamin Joseph") – vocals/producer
- Michael Bell – drums/producer
- Harry Sayers – guitars/synths/producer

== Discography ==
=== Studio albums ===
List of studio albums, with selected chart positions shown
| Title | Album details | Peak chart positions | Certifications |
| Title | Album details | AUS | Certifications |
|---|---|---|---|
| Internal | Released: 9 September 2016; Label: Parlophone, Warner Music Australia; Formats: CD, 2× LP, digital download | 2 | ARIA: Gold |
| Story's Start or End | Released: 9 August 2019; Label: Warner Music Australia; Formats: CD, 2× LP, digital download | 13 | |
| A Lover's Guide to a Lucid Dream | Released: 22 September 2023; Label: Warner Music Australia; Formats: CD, 2× LP, digital download | — | |

=== Live albums ===
List of live albums, with selected details shown
| Title | Album details |
|---|---|
| Live at First Light | Released: 17 May 2024; Label: Warner Music Australia; Formats: digital download |

=== Singles ===
==== As lead artist ====
List of singles, with selected chart positions and certifications, showing year released and album name
| Title | Year | Peak chart positions | | Certifications | Album |
| Title | Year | AUS | AUS Indie | Certifications | Album |
|---|---|---|---|---|---|
| "Listen to Soul, Listen to Blues" | 2013 | 99 | 8 | ARIA: Platinum | Non-album singles |
| "Paranoia, Ghosts & Other Sounds" | 2014 | — | — | | Non-album singles |
| "You Are the One" | 2014 | — | 9 | | Non-album singles |
| "Counting Sheep" | 2015 | 55 | 5 | | Non-album singles |
| "Embracing Me" | 2015 | 69 | —N/a (Note: In 2015, Safia signed with Parlophone. From "Embracing Me" onwards, therefore, their singles became ineligible for the Australian Indie chart.) | ARIA: Gold | Internal |
| "Make Them Wheels Roll" | 2016 | 45 | —N/a | ARIA: Gold; RMNZ: Gold | Internal |
| "Over You" | 2016 | 63 | —N/a | | Internal |
| "My Love Is Gone" | 2016 | — | —N/a | | Internal |
| "Cellophane Rainbow" | 2017 | — | —N/a | | Story's Start or End |
| "Freakin' Out" | 2018 | — | —N/a | | Non-album single |
| "Starlight" | 2018 | — | —N/a | | Story's Start or End |
| "Resolution" | 2019 | — | —N/a | | Story's Start or End |
| "Think We're Not Alone" | 2019 | — | —N/a | | Story's Start or End |
| "Runaway" | 2019 | — | —N/a | | Story's Start or End |
| "Falling Down" | 2022 | — | —N/a | | A Lover's Guide to a Lucid Dream |
| "Today" | 2023 | — | —N/a | | A Lover's Guide to a Lucid Dream |
| "That's the Thing About Love" | 2023 | — | —N/a | | A Lover's Guide to a Lucid Dream |
| "Float" | 2023 | — | —N/a | | A Lover's Guide to a Lucid Dream |
| "A Lover's Guide to a Lucid Dream" | 2023 | — | —N/a | | A Lover's Guide to a Lucid Dream |
"—" denotes a recording that did not chart or was not released in that territory.

==== As featured artist ====
List of singles, with selected chart positions and certifications, showing year released and album name
| Title | Year | Peak chart positions | | Certifications | Album |
| Title | Year | AUS | NZ | Certifications | Album |
|---|---|---|---|---|---|
| "Take Me Over" (Peking Duk featuring Safia) | 2014 | 6 | 32 | ARIA: 3× Platinum; RMNZ: Platinum | Songs to Sweat To |

=== Other appearances ===
List of other non-single song appearances
| Title | Year | Album |
|---|---|---|
| "Take it to Reality" (Alison Wonderland featuring Safia) | 2015 | Run |
| "Left Hand Free" | 2015 | Like a Version: Volume Eleven |

=== Music videos ===
List of music videos by Safia
| Title | Year | Director |
|---|---|---|
| "Listen to Soul, Listen to Blues" | 2013 | Jimmy Ennett |
| "Paranoia, Ghosts & Other Sounds" | 2014 | Jimmy Ennett and Jaeger Vallejera |
| "You Are the One" | 2014 | Jimmy Ennett |
| "Take Me Over" (Peking Duk featuring Safia) | 2014 | Jeff Johnson and Max Miller |
| "Counting Sheep" | 2015 | Jimmy Ennett |
| "Embracing Me" | 2015 | Jimmy Ennett |
| "Take it to Reality" (Alison Wonderland featuring Safia) | 2015 | |
| "Make Them Wheels Roll" | 2016 | Jimmy Ennett |
| "Zion" | 2016 | Safia |
| "Over You" | 2016 | Markus Hofko |
| "My Love Is Gone" | 2016 | Anthony Bristol |
| "Cellophane Rainbow" | 2017 | Jaeger Vallejera |
| "Freakin' Out" | 2018 | Jimmy Annett |
| "Starlight" (Multiverse Video) | 2018 | |
| "Resolution" | 2019 | George Thomson & Lukas Schrank |

== Awards and nominations ==
=== AIR Awards ===
The Australian Independent Record Awards (commonly known informally as AIR Awards) is an annual awards night to recognise, promote and celebrate the success of Australia's Independent Music sector.

| Year | Nominee / work | Award | Result |
|---|---|---|---|
| 2014 | "Paranoia, Ghosts & Other Sounds" | Best Independent Dance, Electronica or Club Single | Nominated |

=== ARIA Music Awards ===
Since 1987 the ARIA Music Awards have run annual awards.

| Year | Category | Nominated artist/work | Result |
|---|---|---|---|
| 2015 | Best Dance Release | "Take Me Over" (Peking Duk featuring Safia) | Nominated |

=== APRA Awards ===
Since 1982 the APRA Awards are run by Australian Performing Right Association to recognise songwriting skills, sales and airplay performance by its members annually.

| Year | Category | Nominated artist/work | Result |
|---|---|---|---|
| 2016 | Most played Australian Work | "Take Me Over" (Peking Duk featuring Safia) | Won |
| 2016 | Dance work of the Year | "Take Me Over" (Peking Duk featuring Safia) | Won |

=== J Award ===
The J Awards are an annual series of Australian music awards that were established by the Australian Broadcasting Corporation's youth-focused radio station Triple J. They commenced in 2005.

| Year | Nominee / work | Award | Result |
|---|---|---|---|
| 2013 | themselves | Unearthed Artist of the Year | Nominated |
| 2016 | Internal | Australian Album of the Year | Nominated |

=== National Live Music Awards ===
The National Live Music Awards (NLMAs) are a broad recognition of Australia's diverse live industry, celebrating the success of the Australian live scene. The awards commenced in 2016.

| Year | Nominee / work | Award | Result |
|---|---|---|---|
| 2016 | Themselves | Live Electronic Act (or DJ) of the Year | Nominated |
