= My Love Is Gone =

Single by Safia

from the album Internal
- Released: 2 September 2016
- Recorded: Canberra
- Genre: Indietronica
- Length: 4:17
- Label: Parlophone
- Songwriter(s): Ben Woolner, Michael Bell, Harry Sayers
- Producer(s): Safia

Safia singles chronology
"Over You" (2016)	"My Love Is Gone" (2016)	"Cellophane Rainbow" (2017)

Music video
- "My Love is Gone" on YouTube

"My Love Is Gone" is a song by Australian electronic music group Safia. It was released on 2 September 2016 as the fourth and final single from their forthcoming debut studio album, Internal (2016).

Remixes were released on 2 December 2016.

== Critical reception ==
Robin Murray from Clash described the track as "spaced out R&B vibes arrive drenched in house-like euphoria".

Kate Carnell from Wickedd Childd said that "Kylie Minogue springs to mind" when describing the song.

== Track listings ==
remixes

1. "My Love is Gone" (Billon remix) - 5:55
2. "My Love is Gone" (Set Mo remix) - 6:52

== Music video ==
The music video for "My Love Is Gone" was released on 16 November 2016.

== Charts ==
Chart (2016)	Peak position
Australian Artist Singles (ARIA)	14
Australia Dance Singles (ARIA)	21
