= Counting Sheep (song) =

Single by Safia
- Released: 13 March 2015
- Genre: Indie electronic
- Length: 2:53
- Label: SAFIA
- Songwriters: Ben Woolner-Kirkham, Micheal Bell, Harry Sayers

Safia singles chronology
"Take Me Over" (2014)	"Counting Sheep" (2015)	"Embracing Me" (2015)

Music video
- "Counting Sheep" on YouTube

"Counting Sheep" is a single by Australian electronic music group Safia, released on 13 March 2015.

The song is unsettling ode to insomnia complete with string section. As SAFIA member Ben Woolner puts it, "If [previous single] 'Paranoia, Ghosts & Other Sounds' could be embodied as a person, then 'Counting Sheep' would be its evil sibling".

== Music video ==
A music video to accompany the release of "Counting Sheep" was first released on YouTube on 15 April 2015. The video takes place on the edge of the lake at a 'Stop Revive Survive' station on a highway, while voice-overs warn 'don't fall asleep', a ghoulish person emerges from a chained box in the back of an open truck. The ghoul is met by men in black as they emerge from dark cars and are quickly transfixed by the ghoul.

== Reviews ==
Sosefina Fuamoli from theaureview said she liked where they've gone with it, saying; "A cool fusion of synths and pop sensibilities, SAFIA have continued to produce music which sets them that little bit aside from other 'indietronica' acts currently doing the rounds."

A staff writer at The Music said; "[Counting Sheep] kicks off with some disconcerting synth-string action before a minimalist verse punctuated by Woolner-Kirkham's falsetto upper-register vocal work carries it through to an aurally lush build before bassy vocoder takes the lyrical reins for the plodding, pseudo-steam-powered chorus".

== Charts ==
In Australia, "Counting Sheep" peaked at number 55 on the ARIA singles chart for the week commencing 6 April 2015. The song also peaked at number 7 on ARIA Australian Artist chart and at number 10 on the ARIA dance chart.

=== Weekly charts ===
Chart (2015)	Peak position
Australian ARIA Singles Chart	55
