= Jonathan Boulet =

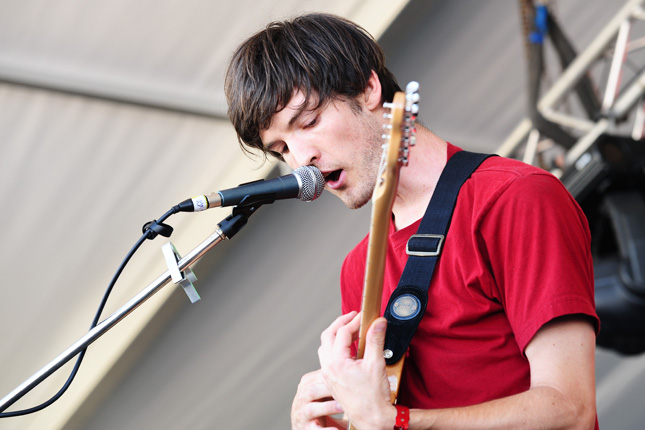
- Boulet at the 2011 Southbound Festival

Background information
- Origin: Northwest Sydney, Australia
- Genres: Alternative rock, indie rock, punk rock, noise rock
- Instruments: Drums, bass, guitar, vocals, keyboards, sampler, percussion
- Years active: 2006–present
- Labels: Modular Recordings, Grupo

Jonathan Boulet is an Australian musician from Sydney. Best known for his work as a solo artist, he wrote, recorded, produced and played almost every instrument in his small garage studio for his debut self-titled album. He played at the Splendour in the Grass music festival in July 2010. He has also toured and performed with acts such as Kate Nash, The Middle East, Tame Impala and Mumford and Sons. In December 2009, Boulet's self-titled debut album was the feature album on triple j.

Boulet studied at Gilroy College where he played in a metalcore band named City Escape Fire. He was also a member of Sydney indie rock band Parades, in which he played drums and contributed vocals, as well as experimental rock band, Top People, for which he recorded all instruments, except vocals and clarinet.

== Discography ==
Jonathan Boulet

- Jonathan Boulet – Modular Recordings (4 December 2009)
- We Keep the Beat, Found the Sound, See the Need, Start the Heart – Modular Recordings (8 June 2012)
- Gubba (2014)

Parades

- foreign tapes (2010)

Party Dozen

- The Living Man (2017)
- Pray for Party Dozen (2020)

ARSE

- Primitive Species (2017)

=== Wolf & Cub ===
- NIL (2020)

== Usage in media ==
Boulet's songs have appeared in EA Sports games: "Ones Who Fly Twos Who Die" was used in 2010 FIFA World Cup South Africa and "You're a Animal" in FIFA 13 and Real Racing 3 on a Instrumental Version.

Additionally, Boulet's song "A Community Service Announcement" has been used in various ads to promote the city of Adelaide.
