= Camp Cope =

Australian punk rock group

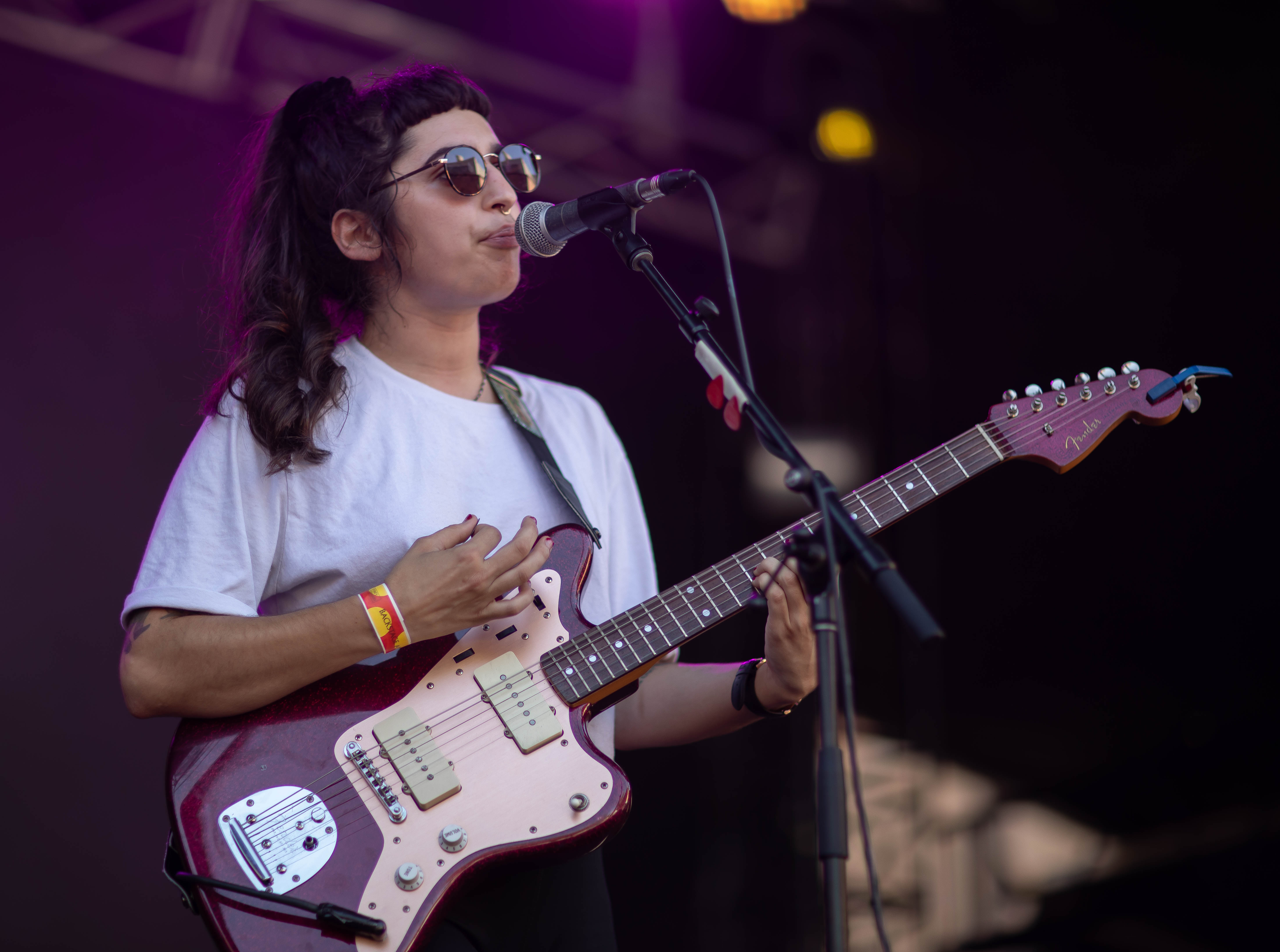
- Georgia Maq performing with Camp Cope at Laneway Festival in 2019

Background information
- Origin: Melbourne, Victoria, Australia
- Genres: Alternative rock; indie rock
- Years active: 2015–2023
- Labels: Run for Cover; Poison City Records
- Past members: Georgia McDonald; Kelly-Dawn Hellmrich; Sarah Thompson
- Website: www.campcopemusic.net

Camp Cope were an Australian alternative rock band formed in 2015 in Melbourne, Victoria. The group's lineup consisted of lead singer, songwriter and guitarist Georgia "Georgia Maq" McDonald, bassist Kelly-Dawn "Kelso" Hellmrich, and drummer Sarah "Thomo" Thompson. The band were signed with independent Melbourne label Poison City Records, where Thompson also works, and independent Boston label Run for Cover Records distributed their releases in North America and Europe. In February 2023, Camp Cope announced their imminent disbandment with a series of final performances. They reunited for the first time at Maq's solo gig at Melbourne venue The Tote on 28 May 2026, playing five songs.

Camp Cope's music has been described as "part Courtney Barnett, part Juliana Hatfield", and "melodic, uplifting and aching". Georgia Maq herself, meanwhile, described the band's sound as "power emo".

== Career ==
=== 2015–2020: Camp Cope and How to Socialise & Make Friends ===
As a regular of the Australian singer/songwriter circuit and with a handful of solo releases under her belt, McDonald decided to bring together Kelly-Dawn Hellmrich on bass and Sarah Thompson on drums to flesh out her solo project. Hellmrich had previously played in Sydney band Palmar Grasp, while Thompson had previously played in Brisbane band Razel. The band was named Camp Cope as a reference to Sydney beach Camp Cove, as Sydney native Hellmrich was feeling homesick. The band played support slots with the likes of The Hotelier, AJJ, and Waxahatchee, as well as playing their own headline shows.

The trio entered the studio, and by the end of the year had recorded their debut album with producer Sam Johnson. Released on Poison City in April 2016, their eight-track self-titled debut earned them critical acclaim and entered the ARIA albums chart at number 36. The album was nominated for a J Award for Australian Album of the Year, while the band themselves were nominated in six categories at the inaugural National Live Music Awards – winning one, the Heatseeker Award. FasterLouder also chose Camp Cope as their Album of the Year for 2016., and the group won Best Emerging Act at The Age's Music Victoria Awards that year. "Lost: Season One", a single from the album referencing the television show Lost, was performed by Camp Cope for Like a Version in September 2016, along with a cover of "Maps" by the Yeah Yeah Yeahs.

After a joint tour of Australia at the end of 2016 with Philadelphia's Cayetana, Poison City issued a limited split single that featured new material by both bands. In 2017, Camp Cope supported Against Me! and Modern Baseball on their Australian tours, toured the United States with Worriers, performed at the St Jerome's Laneway Festival and sold out two shows in the Drama Theatre at the Sydney Opera House. At the end of the year, they returned to the studio to record their second album.

The band's second studio album, How to Socialise & Make Friends, was released on 2 March 2018 by Poison City Records and Run for Cover Records. In June and July 2018, they took part in their second United States tour, co-headlining with Run For Cover label-mates Petal. In late August and early September 2018 they undertook a partial UK and European tour with English band Caves.

In early February 2019, Camp Cope announced their first North American headlining tour starting in April, supported by Thin Lips, Oceanator and An Horse. On this tour, Maq started playing a new unreleased song. In September 2019, they embarked on a UK tour with post-punk band Witching Waves.

In 2019, Happy Mag listed them at number 3 on their list of "the 15 Australian female artists changing the game right now".

=== 2021–2023: Running with the Hurricane and disbandment ===
In November 2021, Camp Cope released the single "Blue", which Rolling Stone highlighted as a "Song You Need to Know". On 19 January 2022, the band announced their third album, Running with the Hurricane, would be released on 25 March 2022. The title single "Running with the Hurricane" was released on 21 January 2022. Both the album and title track are named after the song "Running with the Hurricane" by the Australian folk group Redgum, whose member Hugh McDonald was the late father of Maq. On Instagram, Maq stated: "I didn't like the [Redgum] song to be honest, but the title buried its way into my soul and it felt like my life had been boiled down and summarised by those four words".

In February 2023, the band announced a Melbourne show as part of Brunswick Music Festival while also simultaneously announcing that it would be their last hometown show, and that the band would be dissolving. In June 2023, the band confirmed their final show at the Sydney Opera House concert hall which took place on October 13, 2023.

== Other ventures ==
=== Side projects ===
All members of Camp Cope have been involved in projects with other artists.

Hellmrich performs solo under the moniker of Kelso. Previous collaborators on the project have included Gab Strum of Japanese Wallpaper and Xavier Rubetzki Noonan of Self Talk. Self-described as 'cute weird songs for cute weird people', Kelso has released several singles as well as an EP, Always a Godmother, Never a God.

McDonald, under the moniker of Georgia Maq, released two solo acoustic EPs: Friends and Bowlers Run in 2013, and With a Q in 2014. A song from With a Q, "Footscray Station," was recorded by Camp Cope as the B-side to the single "Keep Growing". McDonald also released a split seven-inch with Spencer Scott in 2015. On 5 December 2019, McDonald released her debut solo album Pleaser, a pop record which she described as "Paul Westerberg meets Robyn". In 2021, McDonald said on the Creative Detour podcast that she is working on new solo material with no release date set. "I feel good about what I'm producing," she said. "I feel like I can produce things myself. In a really fun and cool way. Now I can kind of tell the difference a bit more between like Camp Cope songs and Georgia Maq songs."

Away from her solo career, McDonald was the vocalist for punk band Würst Nürse, and appeared on their debut EP Hot Hot Hot. She left the band in November 2018 after several vocal surgeries. McDonald was also briefly a member of Melbourne indie rock band Employment.

Thompson played drums in Melbourne indie rock band TV Haze, which has released three albums since 2016.

=== Activism ===
In 2016, Camp Cope led a campaign dedicated to preventing and reporting incidents at concerts and festivals called It Takes One. Through this, they put out t-shirts saying 'The Person Wearing This T-shirt Stands Against Sexual Assault And Demands A Change'. Artists such as Courtney Barnett, Chris Farren, DZ Deathrays, Ecca Vandal, Dune Rats and Alex Lahey wore the shirt in support.

While playing the Falls Festival in 2017, Camp Cope changed the lyrics of their song "The Opener" to reflect the lack of female artists playing the festival.

In October 2017, the band performed to help raise funds for Girls Rock! Australia, an organisation which aims to close the gap between male and female musicians in the Australian music scene, by helping improve the skills and training of female and non-male identifying teenage musical artists.

== Musical style ==
Camp Cope is known for McDonald's powerful voice, Hellmrich's distinctive basslines, and Thompson's 'steady, stoic drumming'. They have been described as 'rough, minimal rock [with] a punk edge', and the lyrics 'articulate human entanglements with a lack of sentimentality that belies how much [McDonald] cares'. Songs were initially written by McDonald, who then sent a 'crappy phone recording' to Hellmrich and Thompson, before they all came together to create the finished song.

== Themes ==
In 2016, Hellmrich described lead singer and songwriter Georgia McDonald as a "huge conspiracy theorist". McDonald said the song "Jet Fuel Can't Melt Steel Beams" was "a 'fuck you' to people [who] believe that 9/11 wasn't an inside job. [...] Believing that is like believing that men who rape women aren't responsible for their actions." McDonald said "JFCMSB isn't named after a meme, it's just the truth. The song is about the Orwellian way that the media and society try to convince you that lies are the truth. Like victim blaming. And 9/11."

== Members ==
- Georgia Mcdonald – lead vocals, guitar, piano
- Kelly-Dawn Hellmrich – bass guitar
- Sarah Thompson – drums

Touring musicians

- Jennifer Aslett – guitar, keyboards, piano, backing vocals (2022–2023)
- Lou Hanman – bass (2019, 2022; substitute for Kelly-Dawn Hellmrich)

== Discography ==
=== Studio albums ===
List of studio albums, with release date, label and selected chart positions shown
| Title | Album details | Peak chart positions |
| Title | Album details | AUS |
|---|---|---|
| Camp Cope | Released: 22 April 2016; Label: Poison City (PCR120CD); Format: CD, LP, digital download | 36 |
| How to Socialise & Make Friends | Released: 2 March 2018; Label: Poison City (PCR150CD); Format: CD, LP, digital download, streaming | 6 |
| Running with the Hurricane | Released: 25 March 2022; Label: Poison City (PCR180CD); Format: CD, LP, digital download, streaming | 11 |

=== Live albums ===
List of live albums, with release date and label shown
| Title | Details | Peak chart positions |
| Title | Details | AUS |
|---|---|---|
| Triple J Live at the Wireless – The Metro, Sydney 2018 | Released: 29 March 2021; Format: Digital download, streaming | — |
| Live at Sydney Opera House | Released: 17 October 2025; Format: Vinyl, digital download | 20 |

=== EPs ===
List of EPs, with release date and label shown
| Title | Details |
|---|---|
| Camp Cope / Cayetana Split (with Cayetana) | Released: 20 January 2017; Label: Poison City; Format: Digital download, streaming |
| Camp Cope On Audiotree Live | Released: 15 August 2017; Label: Poison City; Format: Digital download, streaming |

=== Singles ===
List of singles, with year released and album name shown
| Title | Details | Album |
|---|---|---|
| "Lost (Season One)" | 2016 | Camp Cope |
| "Jet Fuel Can't Melt Steel Beams" | 2016 | Camp Cope |
| "Done" | 2016 | Camp Cope |
| "Keep Growing" | 2016 | Cayetana Split |
| "The Opener" | 2017 | How to Socialise & Make Friends |
| "How to Socialise & Make Friends" | 2018 | How to Socialise & Make Friends |
| "Blue" | 2021 | Running with the Hurricane |
| "Running with the Hurricane" | 2022 | Running with the Hurricane |
| "Jealous" | 2022 | Running with the Hurricane |

=== Music videos ===
| Title | Year | Director | Ref. |
|---|---|---|---|
| "Lost (Season One)" | 2016 | Anoushka Wootton | |
| "Done" | 2016 | Paul Voge | |
| "The Opener" | 2018 | Versus | |
| "Sagan-Indiana" | 2018 | Anoushka Wootton | |
| "Running With the Hurricane" | 2022 | James J. Robinson & Rachael Morrow | |
| "Sing Your Heart Out" | 2022 | Natalie van den Dungen | |

== Awards and nominations ==
=== AIR Awards ===
The Australian Independent Record Awards (commonly known informally as AIR Awards) is an annual awards night to recognise, promote and celebrate the success of Australia's Independent Music sector.

| Year | Nominee / work | Award | Result | Ref. |
|---|---|---|---|---|
| 2017 | themselves | Breakthrough Independent Artist | Nominated | |
| 2019 | How to Socialise & Make Friends | Best Independent Hard Rock, Heavey or Punk Album | Nominated | |
| 2023 | Running with the Hurricane | Best Independent Rock Album or EP | Nominated | |

=== ARIA Music Awards ===
The ARIA Music Awards are a set of annual ceremonies presented by Australian Recording Industry Association (ARIA), which recognise excellence, innovation, and achievement across all genres of the music of Australia. They commenced in 1987.

| Year | Nominee / work | Award | Result | Ref. |
|---|---|---|---|---|
| 2018 | How to Socialise & Make Friends | Best Rock Album | Nominated | |

=== Australian Music Prize ===
The Australian Music Prize (the AMP) is an annual award of $30,000 given to an Australian band or solo artist in recognition of the merit of an album released during the year of award. It commenced in 2005. It exists to discover, reward and promote new Australian music of excellence.

| Year | Nominee / work | Award | Result | Ref. |
|---|---|---|---|---|
| 2016 | Camp Cope | Australian Music Prize | Nominated | |
| 2022 | Running with the Hurricane | Australian Music Prize | Nominated | |

=== Australian Women in Music Awards ===
The Australian Women in Music Awards is an annual event that celebrates outstanding women in the Australian Music Industry who have made significant and lasting contributions in their chosen field. They commenced in 2018.

| Year | Nominee / work | Award | Result |
|---|---|---|---|
| 2018 | Camp Cope | Breakthrough Artist Award | Won |

=== J Award ===
The J Awards are an annual series of Australian music awards that were established by the Australian Broadcasting Corporation's youth-focused radio station Triple J. They commenced in 2005.

| Year | Nominee / work | Award | Result |
|---|---|---|---|
| 2016 | Camp Cope | Australian Album of the Year | Nominated |
| 2018 | How to Socialise and Make Friends | Australian Album of the Year | Nominated |

=== Music Victoria Awards ===
The Music Victoria Awards, are an annual awards night celebrating Victorian music. They commenced in 2005.

| Year | Nominee / work | Award | Result |
|---|---|---|---|
| 2016 | Camp Cope | Best Album | Nominated |
| 2016 | "Jet Fuel Can't Melt Steel Beams" | Best Song | Nominated |
| 2016 | themselves | Best Band | Nominated |
| 2016 | themselves | Best Emerging Artist | Won |
| 2018 | How to Socialise & Make Friends | Best Album | Nominated |
| 2018 | How to Socialise & Make Friends | Best Rock/Punk Album | Nominated |
| 2018 | "The Opener" | Best Song | Nominated |
| 2018 | themselves | Best Band | Won |
| 2022 | Camp Cope | Best Group | Nominated |

=== National Live Music Awards ===
The National Live Music Awards (NLMAs) commenced in 2016 to recognize contributions to the live music industry in Australia.

| Year | Nominee / work | Award | Result | Ref. |
|---|---|---|---|---|
| 2016 | Georgia Maq (Camp Cope) | Live Voice of the Year | Nominated | |
| 2016 | Kelly-Dawn Hellmrich (Camp Cope) | Live Bassist of the Year | Nominated | |
| 2016 | themselves | The Heatseeker Award (Best New Artist) | Won | |
| 2017 | Sarah Thompson (Camp Cope) | Live Drummer of the Year | Won | |
| 2017 | Kelly-Dawn Hellmrich (Camp Cope) | Live Bassist of the Year | Won | |
| 2017 | themselves | International Live Achievement (Group) | Nominated | |
| 2017 | themselves | People's Choice - Live Act of the Year | Nominated | |
| 2017 | themselves | Victorian Live Act of the Year | Won | |
| 2018 | themselves | Live Act of the Year | Nominated | |
| 2018 | themselves | International Live Achievement (Band) | Nominated | |
| 2018 | themselves | Industry Achievement | Nominated | |
| 2018 | Georgia Maq (Camp Cope) | Live Voice of the Year | Nominated | |
| 2018 | Sarah Thompson (Camp Cope) | Live Drummer of the Year | Nominated | |
| 2018 | Kelly-Dawn Hellmrich (Camp Cope) | Live Bassist of the Year | Nominated | |
| 2023 | Kelly-Dawn Hellmrich (Camp Cope) | Best Live Bassist | Won | |
| 2023 | Sarah Thompson (Camp Cope) | Best Live Drummer | Nominated | |
| 2023 | Georgia Maq (Camp Cope) | Best Live Voice in Victoria | Nominated | |
