= Poison City Records =

Australian independent record label

- Founded: 2003
- Genre: Alternative, punk
- Country of origin: Australia
- Location: Melbourne, Australia
- Official website: poisoncityrecords.com

Poison City Records is an independent record label based in Melbourne, Victoria, founded in 2003. The label opened a physical store in 2008, at 400 Brunswick Street, Fitzroy selling records and skateboards. In mid-2020, the store and label moved from Fitzroy to Preston.

From 2008 to 2017, Poison City ran an annual three-day punk rock music festival called Poison City Weekender, with bands playing at multiple venues throughout Melbourne.

== Artists released by Poison City Records ==
=== Current roster ===
- An Horse
- Batpiss
- Bench Press
- Body Type
- Cable Ties
- Dark Fair
- Flyying Colours
- Georgia Maq
- Hexdebt
- Jess Ribeiro
- Leah Senior
- Loobs
- Lou Barlow (Australian releases only)
- Michael Beach
- The Meanies
- Mere Women
- Mod Con
- Moody Beaches
- Screensaver
- Swervedriver (Australian releases only)
- Thomy Sloane

=== Alumni ===
- A Death in the Family
- Apart From This
- The Bennies
- Camp Cope
- Chinese Burns Unit
- Clowns
- Conation
- Daylight Robbery
- Daysworth Fighting
- Deep Heat
- Fear Like Us
- Fires of Waco
- Flour
- Former Cell Mates
- Freak Wave
- Gareth Liddiard
- The Gifthorse
- Grand Fatal
- Grim Fandango
- Harmony
- Hoodlum Shouts
- Horror My Friend
- Human Parts
- Infinite Void
- Jen Buxton
- Kelso
- Kill Whitey
- Knapsack
- Lead Sketch Union
- Like...Alaska
- Lincoln Le Fevre
- Luca Brasi
- Lungs
- The Nation Blue
- The Optionals
- Palm Springs
- Paper Arms
- Postblue
- Restorations
- Ribbons Patterns
- Samiam
- Screamfeeder
- The Smith Street Band
- TV Haze
- Tyre Swans
- White Walls
- Wil Wagner
