= I Can't Breathe (Jerome Farah song) =

2020 debut single by Jerome Farah

Single by Jerome Farah
- Released: 26 June 2020
- Recorded: 2020
- Genre: Neo soul; hip hop; R&B
- Length: 2:34
- Label: Jerome Farah; Sony Music Australia
- Songwriter: Jerome Farah
- Producer: Jerome Farah

Jerome Farah singles chronology
"Hoodlum" (2018)	"I Can't Breathe" (2020)	"Mikey Might" (2020)

"I Can't Breathe" is the debut single by Australian rapper Jerome Farah, released on 26 June 2020 through Sony Music Australia. The song discusses racism and police brutality.

All proceeds from Australian sales of the song go towards the Victorian Aboriginal Legal Service. Sony Music Australia committed to matching each contribution.

== Background ==
"I Can't Breathe" is Farah's debut solo single, after previously co-writing songs "Marryuna", "Mr La Di Da Di", "Meditjin", and "Waiting" for artists Baker Boy and Kian, respectively.

The track was written in the aftermath of the murder of George Floyd by a police officer, as well as other victims of police brutality, Eric Garner and David Dungay Jr.

== Recording and composition ==
"I Can't Breathe" is primarily a neo soul, hip hop, and R&B song. The song discusses Farah's personal experiences with racism in Australia, the 2020 Black Lives Matter movement and his Zimbabwean heritage. The song additionally contains lyrics criticising negative dialogue regarding the Black Lives Matter movement, the "#AllLivesMatter" slogan and white privilege.

== Artwork ==
The artwork depicts a raised fist at a Black Lives Matter protest, with various Melbourne landmarks shown in the background.

== Music video ==
The music video was released on 25 June 2020 and was directed by Ryan Sauer. The video shows Farah rapping in a warehouse whilst getting his afro braided, interspersed with scenes where fellow Zimbabwean Australians of various ages stand behind him in a statement of solidarity.

== Live performances ==
Farah performed the song live on Australian live music program The Sound on 19 July 2020. Prior to his performance, Farah said of the song:

"The reason I chose this song is, for one, it's the only song I've got. And two, it means a lot to myself and for my people as well. I've protested, signed petitions, done everything I could, and I still felt like it wasn't enough. So I believe I should use what was gifted to me and that is my music, my talent – the only thing I'm really good at. So, I used that to write this song. I hope you enjoy it."

== Critical reception ==
"I Can't Breathe" received widespread acclaim from critics upon release. Al Newstead of Triple J said: "Flexing both bars and his gritty set of singing pipes, 'I Can't Breathe' threads attitude with artistry", and stated that the song would appeal to fans of Anderson .Paak and Childish Gambino. In an article about his follow-up single "Mikey Might", The Partae described "I Can't Breathe" as "a compelling, politically-charged fusion of neo soul, alternative rap, and R&B that [speak] to issues of police brutality and racism", and additionally described it as "a powerful opening statement of intent."

Acclaim Mag found the song "[blends] musical styles" and labelled it "hard-hitting and straight to the point". The Local Frequency dubbed the song "a politically charged anthem", and stated Farah "showcases his dexterous artistry with a radiant cadence and fierce wordplay." Emma Jones of Purple Sneakers found the song "infectiously good to listen to" and called Farah's rapping "blistering".

== Release history ==
Release formats for "I Can't Breathe"
Region	Date	Formats	Label	Reference
Australia	26 June 2020	Alternative radio	Sony Music Australia	
Worldwide	26 June 2020	Digital download; streaming	Jerome Farah / Sony Music Australia	
