= APRA Music Awards of 2020 =

Australian music awards

- Date: 2 May 2020
- Location: Virtual event: numerous venues

Highlights
- Most nominations: Tones and I (4)
- Website: apraamcos.com.au/awards/

The APRA Music Awards of 2020 are the 38th annual series, known as APRA Awards, in 2020. The awards are given in a series of categories in three divisions and in separate ceremonies throughout the year: the APRA Music Awards, Art Music Awards and Screen Music Awards. They are provided by the Australasian Performing Right Association and the Australasian Mechanical Copyright Owners Society, known jointly as APRA AMCOS. In mid-February the associations announced that the previous category, Overseas Recognition Award, would be replaced by Global APRA Music Awards with separate ceremonies at three locations: Los Angeles (26 February 2020) for western North American-based artists, Nashville (1 March) for central and eastern North American-based artists and London (6 March) for European-based artists.

Due to the COVID-19 pandemic, the 2020 APRA Music Awards were not held in the usual live format. The event had been due to take place on 28 April at the International Convention Centre in Sydney, instead they were streamed online for the first time as a virtual event on 25 May with Indigenous rapper, Briggs as host. The format featured presenters, winners and performances of the Song of the Year finalists. The nominees were announced on 7 April, winners for Most Performed International Work and Licensee of the Year were announced on 14 May, and the full list of winners was provided to media outlets on 25 May.

The Art Music Awards are provided by APRA AMCOS in conjunction with the Australian Music Centre (AMC), and in 2020 the ceremony was also a virtual event, held on 8 September, hosted by Zela Margossian, Dr Lou Bennett, Jonathan Biggins. They were presented with several new and redefined categories to "acknowledge the achievements of composers, performers and educators in the genres of contemporary classical music, jazz, improvisation, sound art and experimental music."

The Screen Music Awards are presented jointly by APRA AMCOS and the Australian Guild of Screen Composers (AGSC), to "acknowledge excellence and innovation in the field of screen composition." Winners were announced on 1 December at a virtual ceremony and hosted by Justine Clarke, Claudia Karvan and Meyne Wyatt.

== Presenters and performers ==
Indigenous rapper, Briggs, hosted the virtual APRA Music Awards of 2020 on 25 May. The musical director, Kate Miller-Heidke, curated the performers:

| Artist(s) | Song(s) | Ref. |
|---|---|---|
| John Butler and Mama Kin | Guy Sebastian's "Choir" | |
| Kira Puru and Mo'Ju | Thelma Plum's "Better in Blak" | |
| William Crighton | 5 Seconds of Summer's "Teeth" | |
| Nikka Costa and Justin Stanley | The Teskey Brothers' "I Get Up" | |
| The Dawn of May | Tones and I's "Dance Monkey" | |

== APRA Music Awards ==
=== Breakthrough Songwriter of the Year ===
| Writer(s) | Publisher(s) | Result | Ref. |
|---|---|---|---|
| Ruel van Dijk p.k.a. Ruel | Universal Music Publishing | Nominated | |
| Sampa Tembo p.k.a. Sampa the Great | —N/a | Nominated | |
| Thelma Plum | Sony/ATV Music Publishing | Nominated | |
| Liam Gough, Brendon Love, Josh Teskey and Sam Teskey (The Teskey Brothers) | Mushroom Music o.b.o. Ivy League Music | Nominated | |
| Toni Watson p.k.a. Tones and I | Kobalt Music Publishing o.b.o. Tones and I | Won | |

=== Licensee of the Year ===
| Venue | Location | Result | Ref. |
|---|---|---|---|
| Meredith Music Festival | Meredith, Victoria | Won | |

=== Most Performed Alternate Work ===
| Title and/or artist | Writer(s) | Publisher(s) | Result | Ref. |
|---|---|---|---|---|
| "God Forgot" by The Rubens | Scott Baldwin, Elliott Margin, Sam Margin, Zaac Margin, William Zeglis | Mushroom Music o.b.o. Ivy League Music | Nominated | |
| "Good Lord" by Birds of Tokyo | Ian Berney, Ian Kenny, Glenn Sarangapany, Adam Spark, Adam Weston | Mushroom Music o.b.o. Ivy League Music | Nominated | |
| "Miracle Love" by Matt Corby | Matt Corby, Dann Hume | BMG Rights Management / Sony/ATV Music Publishing | Nominated | |
| "Radio Silence" by Gretta Ray | Gretta Ray | Sony/ATV Music Publishing | Nominated | |
| "Waiting" by Kian | Kian Brownfield, Jerome Farah | Kobalt Music Publishing o.b.o. KB Recording / Mushroom Music | Won | |

=== Most Performed Australian Work ===
| Title and/or artist | Writer(s) | Publisher(s) | Result | Ref. |
|---|---|---|---|---|
| "7 Minutes" by Dean Lewis | Dean Lewis, Nicholas Atkinson, Edward Holloway | Kobalt Music Publishing o.b.o. Specific Music | Nominated | |
| "Choir" by Guy Sebastian | Guy Sebastian, Trevor Brown, William Simmons | Universal Music Publishing / Mushroom Music o.b.o. Reservoir | Nominated | |
| "Dance Monkey" by Tones and I | Toni Watson | Kobalt Music Publishing o.b.o. Tones and I | Nominated | |
| "Good Lord" by Birds of Tokyo | Ian Berney, Ian Kenny, Glenn Sarangapany, Adam Spark, Adam Weston | Mushroom Music | Nominated | |
| "Waiting" by Kian | Kian Brownfield, Jerome Farah | Kobalt Music Publishing o.b.o. KB Recording / Mushroom Music | Won | |

=== Most Performed Australian Work Overseas ===
| Title and/or artist | Writer(s) | Publisher(s) | Result | Ref. |
|---|---|---|---|---|
| "Cheap Thrills" by Sia | Sia Furler, Greg Kurstin | Sony/ATV Music Publishing | Won | |

=== Most Performed Blues & Roots Work ===
| Title and/or artist | Writer(s) | Publisher(s) | Result | Ref. |
|---|---|---|---|---|
| "Blackbird" by Tash Sultana | Tash Sultana | Kobalt Music Publishing o.b.o. Tash Sultana | Nominated | |
| "I Get Up" by The Teskey Brothers | Liam Gough / Brendon Love / Josh Teskey / Sam Teskey | Mushroom Music o.b.o. Ivy League Music | Nominated | |
| "Just Call" by John Butler Trio | John Butler | Downtown Music Publishing o.b.o. Family Music | Won | |
| "Laps Around the Sun" by Ziggy Alberts | Ziggy Alberts | Kobalt Music Publishing o.b.o. Albert & Co Music | Nominated | |
| "Sound of Summer" by Busby Marou | Thomas Busby / Jeremy Marou / Phil Barton / Lindsay Rimes | Sony/ATV Music Publishing / Mushroom Music | Nominated | |

=== Most Performed Country Work ===
| Title and/or artist | Writer(s) | Publisher(s) | Result | Ref. |
|---|---|---|---|---|
| "Backroad Nation" by Lee Kernaghan | Lee Kernaghan, Phil Barton, Colin Buchanan, Garth Porter, Lindsay Rimes | Universal Music Publishing / Mushroom Music o.b.o. Anthem Entertainment | Nominated | |
| "Girl" by Maren Morris | Sarah Aarons, Greg Kurstin, Maren Morris | Sony/ATV Music Publishing / Downtown Music Publishing | Nominated | |
| "Happy" by Travis Collins | Travis Collins, Allison Veltz | ABC Music Publishing / Mushroom Music o.b.o. Big Deal Music | Nominated | |
| "Love That" by Seaforth | Thomas Jordan, Mitchell Thompson, Daniel Ross, Michael Whitworth | ABC Music Publishing / Warner Chappell Music / Universal/MCA Music Publishing | Nominated | |
| "Wouldn't Change a Thing" by Troy Cassar-Daley | Troy Cassar-Daley, Greg Storer | Mushroom Music / ABC Music Publishing | Nominated | |
| "Young Again" by Morgan Evans | Morgan Evans, Chris DeStefano, Joshua Kear | Warner Chappell Music / Sony/ATV Music Publishing / Downtown Music Publishing | Won | |

=== Most Performed Dance Work ===
| Title and/or artist | Writer(s) | Publisher(s) | Result | Ref. |
|---|---|---|---|---|
| "Better Together" by Hayden James featuring Running Touch | Hayden James, Matthew Kopp, Jack Glass, Cassian Stewart-Kasimba | Kobalt Music Publishing o.b.o. Future Classic / BMG Rights Management / Universal Music Publishing | Won | |
| "Solid Gold" by Pnau featuring Kira Divine & Marques Toliver | Nick Littlemore, Sam Littlemore, Peter Mayes, Shakira Marshall, Marques Toliver | Universal Music Publishing | Nominated | |
| "Sugar" by Peking Duk featuring Jack River | Adam Hyde, Reuben Styles, Holly Rankin, Kaelyn Behr, Xavier Dunn, Karsten Dahlgaard, Rene Dif, Claus Norreen, Anders Oeland, Johnny Pedersen, Soren Rasted | Universal Music Publishing / BMG Rights Management / Mushroom Music / Sony/ATV Music Publishing / Warner Chappell Music / Universal/MCA Music Publishing | Nominated | |
| "Take It" by Dom Dolla | Dominic Matheson | Sweat It Out Publishing administered by Kobalt Music Publishing | Nominated | |
| "Treat You Better" by Rüfüs Du Sol | Jonathon George, James Hunt, Tyrone Lindqvist, Jason Evigan, Mark Foster | Kobalt Music Publishing o.b.o. Rüfüs Du Sol / BMG Rights Management / Sony/ATV Music | Nominated | |

=== Most Performed International Work ===
| Title and/or artist | Writer(s) | Publisher(s) | Result | Ref. |
|---|---|---|---|---|
| "Happier" by Marshmello & Bastille | Marshmello, Dan Smith, Steve Mac | Kobalt Music Publishing / Universal Music Publishing | Nominated | |
| "Nothing Breaks Like a Heart" by Mark Ronson featuring Miley Cyrus | Mark Ronson, Miley Cyrus, Thomas Brenneck, Ilsey Juber, Clement Picard, Maxime Picard, Conor Szymanski | Native Tongue Music Publishing / Universal/MCA Music Publishing / BMG Rights Management / Sony/ATV Music Publishing / Mushroom Music o.b.o. Big Deal | Nominated | |
| "Promises" by Calvin Harris & Sam Smith | Calvin Harris, Sam Smith, Jessie Reyez | Sony/ATV Music Publishing / BMG Rights Management | Nominated | |
| "Shallow" by Lady Gaga & Bradley Cooper | Stefani Germanotta, Mark Ronson, Anthony Rossomando, Andrew Wyatt | Universal/MCA Music Publishing / Sony/ATV Music Publishing / Native Tongue Music Publishing / Downtown Music Publishing | Won | |
| "Sunflower" by Post Malone & Swae Lee | Post Malone, Swae Lee, Louis Bell, Carter Lang, Carl Rosen, William Walsh | Sony/ATV Music Publishing / Universal/MCA Music Publishing / Warner Chappell Music | Nominated | |

=== Most Performed Pop Work ===
| Title and/or artist | Writer(s) | Publisher(s) | Result | Ref. |
|---|---|---|---|---|
| "7 Minutes" by Dean Lewis | Dean Lewis, Nicholas Atkinson, Edward Holloway | Kobalt Music Publishing o.b.o. Specific Music / BMG Rights Management | Won | |
| "All Loved Up" by Amy Shark | Amy Billings, Jack Antonoff | Mushroom Music o.b.o. UNIFIED Music Publishing / Sony/ATV Music Publishing | Nominated | |
| "Choir" by Guy Sebastian | Guy Sebastian, Trevor Brown, William Simmons | Universal Music Publishing / Mushroom Music o.b.o. Reservoir | Nominated | |
| "Dance Monkey" by Tones and I | Toni Watson | Kobalt Music Publishing o.b.o. Tones And I | Nominated | |
| "Never Really Over" by Katy Perry | Daniel James, Leah Haywood, Hayley Warner, Katy Perry, Gino Barletta, Michelle Buzz, Jason Gill, Dagny Sandvik, Anton Zaslavski | Sony/ATV Music Publishing / Warner Chappell Music / Kobalt Music Publishing / Universal/MCA Music Publishing | Nominated | |

=== Most Performed Rock Work ===
| Title and/or artist | Writer(s) | Publisher(s) | Result | Ref. |
|---|---|---|---|---|
| "Clarity" by Polish Club | David Novak, John-Henry Pajak | Sony/ATV Music Publishing | Nominated | |
| "Dinosaurs" by Ruby Fields | Ruby Fields, Chris Collins | Sony/ATV Music Publishing | Nominated | |
| "Jellyfish" by Slowly Slowly | Ben Stewart | Native Tongue Music Publishing | Nominated | |
| "Shutting Down Our Town" by Jimmy Barnes featuring Troy Cassar-Daley | Troy Cassar-Daley | Mushroom Music | Won | |
| "Otherside" by The Living End | Chris Cheney, Scott Owen, Andy Strachan, Tobias Kuhn | BMG Rights Management / Kobalt Music Publishing | Nominated | |

=== Most Performed Urban Work ===
| Title and/or artist | Writer(s) | Publisher(s) | Result | Ref. |
|---|---|---|---|---|
| "Butter" by Triple One | Conor Grealish, Martin Guilfoyle, William Gunns, Dominic Kim | —N/a | Nominated | |
| "Cool as Hell" by Baker Boy | Danzal Baker, Carl Dimataga, Jesse Ferris, Morgan Jones, Brendan Tuckerman, Dallas Woods | Sony/ATV Music Publishing / Kobalt Music Publishing | Nominated | |
| "Exit Sign" by Hilltop Hoods featuring Illy & Ecca Vandal | Barry Francis p.k.a. DJ Debris, Matthew Lambert p.k.a. Suffa, Daniel Smith p.k.a. MC Pressure, Alasdair Murray, Sarah Aarons, Andrew Burford | Sony/ATV Music Publishing / BMG Rights Management / Universal Music Publishing | Nominated | |
| "Leave Me Lonely" by Hilltop Hoods | Barry Francis p.k.a. DJ Debris, Matthew Lambert p.k.a. Suffa, Daniel Smith p.k.a. MC Pressure, Leigh Ryan, Richard Berry | Sony/ATV Music Publishing / Native Tongue Music Publishing / Campbell Connelly | Won | |
| "Then What" by Illy | Alasdair Murray/ Tobias Frelin / Elias Naslin | BMG Rights Management / Kobalt Music Publishing | Nominated | |

=== Song of the Year ===
| Title and/or artist | Writer(s) | Publisher(s) | Result | Ref. |
|---|---|---|---|---|
| "Better in Blak" by Thelma Plum | Thelma Plum, Alexander Burnett, Oliver Horton | Sony/ATV Music Publishing | Nominated | |
| "Choir" by Guy Sebastian | Guy Sebastian, Trevor Brown, William Simmons | Universal Music Publishing / Mushroom Music | Nominated | |
| "Dance Monkey" by Tones and I | Toni Watson | Kobalt Music Publishing o.b.o. Tones and I | Won | |
| "I Get Up" by The Teskey Brothers | Liam Gough, Brendon Love, Josh Teskey, Sam Teskey | Mushroom Music o.b.o. Ivy League Music | Nominated | |
| "Teeth" by 5 Seconds of Summer | Luke Hemmings, Ashton Irwin, Louis Bell, Ali Tamposi, Ryan Tedder, Andrew Watt, Gillian Gilbert, Peter Hook, Stephen Morris, Evan Rogers, Carl Sturken, Bernard Sumner | Sony/ATV Music Publishing | Nominated | |

=== Songwriter of the Year ===
| Writer(s) | Publisher(s) | Result | Ref. |
|---|---|---|---|
| Barry Francis p.k.a. DJ Debris, Matthew Lambert p.k.a. Suffa, Daniel Smith p.k.a. MC Pressure | Hilltop Hoods | Won | |

== Global APRA Music Awards ==
In mid-February 2020 APRA AMCOS announced that the Overseas Recognition Award from the APRA Music Awards would be replaced by Global APRA Music Awards with separate ceremonies in London, Los Angeles and Nashville . At each location awards were presented for Breakthrough Songwriter of the Year, Distinguished Services, Overseas Recognition Award, and Songwriter of the Year. The London-based awards, "recognise APRA AMCOS members living in the UK and Europe." The London ceremony was held on 6 March at Ham Yard Hotel, Soho and hosted by Georgia Mooney. The Los Angeles ceremony was held at the GRAMMY Museum, Clive Davis Theatre on 26 February and hosted by Maya Jupiter to "recognise APRA AMCOS members living on the West Coast of the U.S." On 1 March, the Nashville ceremony, to "recognise APRA AMCOS members living on the East Coast of the U.S.", was hosted by O'Shea and held at Clementine Hall.

=== Breakthrough Songwriter of the Year ===
London
| Writer(s) | Publisher(s) | Result | Ref. |
|---|---|---|---|
| Kaity Dunstan p.k.a. Cloves | Universal Music Publishing o.b.o. Canal Music Publishing | Won | |
| Chiara Hunter | Sony/ATV Music Publishing | Nominated | |
| Steven Manovski | —N/a | Nominated | |
| Noah Hill, Anatole Serret, Louie Swain, Patrick Hetherington, Jules Crommelin of Parcels | Warner Chappell Music o.b.o. Kitsune | Nominated | |
Los Angeles
| Writer(s) | Publisher(s) | Result | Ref. |
| Grace Shaw p.k.a. Mallrat | Kobalt Music Publishing o.b.o. Dew Process | Won | |
| Maaike Lebbing p.k.a. Kito | Sony/ATV Music Publishing | Nominated | |
| Nicholas Audino, Lewis Hughes, Khaled Rohaim, Te Whiti Warbrick of Twice as Nice | Sony/ATV Music Publishing / BMG Rights Management o.b.o. Orange Factory Repertoire / Universal/MCA Music Publishing o.b.o. Electric Feel Music | Nominated | |
| Ruel Van Dijk p.k.a. Ruel | Universal Music Publishing | Nominated | |
Nashville
| Writer(s) | Publisher(s) | Result | Ref. |
| Mitchell Thompson, Thomas Jordan of Seaforth | Warner Chappell Music | Won | |
| Paul Mabury | Sony/ATV Music Publishing | Nominated | |
| Rebecca Chillcott p.k.a. Ruby Boots | ABC Music Publishing | Nominated | |
| Sinead Burgess | —N/a | Nominated | |

=== Distinguished Services ===
London
| Writer(s) | Result | Ref. |
|---|---|---|
| Nick Cave, Warren Ellis | Won | |
Los Angeles
| Writer(s) | Result | Ref. |
| Colin Hay | Won | |
Nashville
| Writer(s) | Result | Ref. |
| Tommy Emmanuel | Won | |

=== Overseas Recognition ===
London
| Writer(s) | Publisher(s) | Result | Ref. |
|---|---|---|---|
| Jed Kurzel | G Schirmer Australia o.b.o. Chester Music | Won | |
| Jordan Rakei | Sony/ATV Music Publishing | Nominated | |
| Kaity Dunstan p.k.a. Cloves | Universal Music Publishing o.b.o. Canal Music Publishing | Nominated | |
| Noah Hill, Anatole Serret, Louie Swain, Patrick Hetherington, Jules Crommelin of Parcels | Warner Chappell Music o.b.o. Kitsune | Nominated | |
Los Angeles
| Writer(s) | Publisher(s) | Result | Ref. |
| Joel Little | Sony/ATV Music Publishing | Won | |
| Alex Hope | Sony/ATV Music Publishing | Nominated | |
| Harley Streten p.k.a. Flume | Kobalt Music Publishing o.b.o. Future Classic | Nominated | |
| Sarah Aarons | Sony/ATV Music Publishing | Nominated | |
Nashville
| Writer(s) | Publisher(s) | Result | Ref. |
| Rick Price | —N/a | Won | |
| Mia Fieldes | Sony/ATV Music Publishing | Nominated | |
| Mitchell Thompson, Thomas Jordan of Seaforth | Warner Chappell Music | Nominated | |
| Paul Mabury | Sony/ATV Music Publishing | Nominated | |

=== Songwriter of the Year ===
London
| Writer(s) | Publisher(s) | Result | Ref. |
|---|---|---|---|
| Jordan Rakei | Sony/ATV Music Publishing | Won | |
Los Angeles
| Writer(s) | Publisher(s) | Result | Ref. |
| Sarah Aarons | Sony/ATV Music Publishing | Won | |
Nashville
| Writer(s) | Publisher(s) | Result | Ref. |
| Phil Barton | —N/a | Won | |

== Art Music Awards ==
=== Work of the Year: Chamber Music ===
| Title | Composer / librettist | Performer | Result | Ref. |
|---|---|---|---|---|
| Cleave | Natasha Anderson | Ensemble Offspring, International Contemporary Ensemble, Ensemble Adapter | Nominated | |
| passing bells: day | Chris Dench | Alex Raineri | Won | |
| String Quartet No. 3: Hidden Agendas | Brett Dean | Doric String Quartet | Nominated | |
| Where the Quiet Rests | John Pax | WasteLAnd | Nominated | |

=== Work of the Year: Choral ===
| Title | Composer / librettist | Performer | Result | Ref. |
|---|---|---|---|---|
| A Civic Space | Julian Day | Musicians from the Barossa region | Nominated | |
| I am Martuwarra | Paul Stanhope / Steve Hawke (text) | Gondwana Choirs, Luminescence Chamber Singers, Valla Voices, Hunter Singers, Resonance, Lyn Williams (conductor) | Won | |
| Requiem-Recomposed | Gordon Hamilton | Omega Ensemble, The Australian Voices, Gordon Hamilton (conductor) | Nominated | |
| Singing the Love | Ross Edwards | Choir of King's College, Cambridge, Daniel Hyde (conductor) | Nominated | |

=== Work of the Year: Dramatic ===
| Title | Composer / librettist | Performer | Result | Ref. |
|---|---|---|---|---|
| Ned Kelly | Luke Styles / Peter Goldsworthy | Lost and Found Opera, Chris van Tuinen (conductor) | Nominated | |
| Oscar and Lucinda | Elliott Gyger / Pierce Wilcox | Sydney Chamber Opera | Won | |
| Out of Chaos | Ekrem Eli Phoenix | Gravity and Other Myths | Nominated | |
| Speechless | Cat Hope | Judith Dodsworth, Karina Utomo, Caitlin Cassidy, Sage Pbbbt (soloists); with Australian Bass Orchestra, Decibel New Music Ensemble, and Aaron Wyatt (conductor) | Won | |

=== Work of the Year: Electroacoustic/Sound Art ===
| Title | Composer | Performer | Result | Ref. |
|---|---|---|---|---|
| Coronal Mass | Amanda Cole | —N/a | Nominated | |
| Diaspora | Robin Fox, Erkki Veltheim in a Chamber Made Production | Robin Fox, Erkki Veltheim, Madeleine Flynn, Georgie Darvidis, Tamara Saulwick (co-direction/dramaturgy) and Nick Roux (video artist) | Nominated | |
| Everywhen | Matthias Schack-Arnott | Matthias Schack-Arnott | Won | |
| Imago | Fiona Hill | Lamorna Nightingale, Jane Sheldon, Fiona Hill | Nominated | |

=== Work of the Year: Jazz ===
| Title | Composer | Performer | Result | Ref. |
|---|---|---|---|---|
| Aventurine | Linda May Han Oh | Linda May Han Oh, Greg Ward, Matt Mitchell, Ches Smith, Fung Chern Hwei, Sara Caswell, Benni von Gutzeit, Jeremy Harman, Invenio with Gian Slater (director) | Won | |
| Displacement | Josh Kelly | Josh Kelly, Niran Dasika, Aviva Endean, Mary Rapp, Jacques Emery, Maria Moles | Nominated | |
| The Colours of Grief | Adam Page | The Adam Page Ensemble | Nominated | |
| Umi No Uzu | Aaron Choulai | Australian Art Orchestra, Aaron Choulai, Miyama McQueen-Tokita, Kojoe | Nominated | |

=== Work of the Year: Large Ensemble ===
| Title | Composer | Performer | Result | Ref. |
|---|---|---|---|---|
| Beatrice: "Piano Concerto" | Kate Moore | Vivian Choi (piano), Willoughby Symphony, Fabian Russell (conductor) | Nominated | |
| Flinders and Trim | Maria Grenfell | Tasmania Symphony Orchestra, Eivind Aadland (conductor) | Nominated | |
| Icarus | Harry Sdraulig | Lloyd Hudson (piccolo), Tasmanian Symphony Orchestra, Elena Schwarz | Nominated | |
| "Viola Concerto" | James Ledger | Brett Dean, West Australian Symphony Orchestra, Fabien Gabel (conductor) | Won | |

=== Work of the Year: Notated Composition ===
| Title | Composer / librettist | Performer | Result | Ref. |
|---|---|---|---|---|
| Oscar and Lucinda | Elliott Gyger / Pierce Wilcox | Sydney Chamber Opera | Nominated | |
| "Rhythm City" | Tristan Coelho | Zubin Kanga | Nominated | |
| Sheets of Sound | Annie Hui-Hsin Hsieh, Matthias Schack-Arnott, Louise Devenish, Stuart James | Louise Devenish | Won | |
| Weave | Cathy Millike | Adelaide Symphony Orchestra, Douglas Boyd (conductor) | Nominated | |

=== Performance of the Year: Jazz / Improvised Music ===
| Title | Composer | Performer | Result | Ref. |
|---|---|---|---|---|
| Amen | Joseph Franklin | Joseph Franklin | Nominated | |
| Bridge of Dreams | Sandy Evans, Shubha Mudgal, Aneesh Pradhan | Sandy Evans, Shubha Mudgal, Aneesh Pradhan, Sirens Big Band | Won | |
| The Cordeaux Mirror | Phil Slater | Phil Slater Quintet | Nominated | |
| The Plains | Peter Knight | Australian Art Orchestra | Nominated | |

=== Performance of the Year: Notated Composition ===
| Title | Composer / librettist | Performer | Result | Ref. |
|---|---|---|---|---|
| Oscar and Lucinda | Elliott Gyger / Pierce Wilcox | Sydney Chamber Opera | Nominated | |
| "Rhythm City" | Tristan Coelho | Zubin Kanga | Nominated | |
| Sheets of Sound | Annie Hui-Hsin Hsieh, Matthias Schack-Arnott, Louise Devenish, Stuart James | Louise Devenish | Won | |
| Weave | Cathy Milliken | Adelaide Symphony Orchestra, Douglas Boyd (conductor) | Nominated | |

=== Award for Excellence in Music Education ===
| Organisation / individual | Work | Result | Ref. |
|---|---|---|---|
| Australian Art Orchestra | Creative Music Intensive | Nominated | |
| Netanela Mizrahi and Guwanbal Gurruwiwi | Djari Project | Won | |
| Speak Percussion | Sounds Unheard Education Program | Nominated | |
| Tasmanian Symphony Orchestra | Australian Composers' School | Nominated | |

=== Award for Excellence in a Regional Area ===
| Organisation / individual | Work | Result | Ref. |
|---|---|---|---|
| Bangalow Music Festival | 2019 festival | Nominated | |
| Gillian Howell and Tura New Music | Fitzroy Valley New Music Project | Won | |
| Netanela Mizrahi and Guwanbal Gurruwiwi | Djari Project | Nominated | |
| Rae Howell | Bee-Sharp Honeybee | Nominated | |

=== Award for Excellence in Experimental Music ===
| Organisation / individual | Work | Result | Ref. |
|---|---|---|---|
| Gelareh Pour | Garden Quartet | Nominated | |
| The Music Box Project | Shallow Listening | Won | |
| Nat Grant | FEED | Nominated | |
| Zubin Kanga | 2019 Performances of Ballast by Jon Rose | Nominated | |

=== Richard Gill Award for Distinguished Services to Australian Music ===
| Organisation / individual | Result | Ref. |
|---|---|---|
| Ros Bandt | Won | |

=== Luminary Award: Individual (National) ===
| Individual | Work | Result | Ref. |
|---|---|---|---|
| Chris Sainsbury | Initiating and driving Ngarra-Burria: First Peoples Composers program | Won | |

=== Luminary Award: Organisation (National) ===
| Organisation | Work | Result | Ref. |
|---|---|---|---|
| Tasmanian Symphony Orchestra | Australian Composer's School, Australian Conducting Academy, and professional development opportunities for Australian classical musicians | Won | |

=== Luminary Award: State & Territory Awards ===
| Organisation | Work | Result | Ref. |
|---|---|---|---|
| Canberra International Music Festival (ACT) | for their record-breaking 2019 event and ongoing reputation for high quality and innovative programming | Won | |
| Joanna Drimatis (NSW) | for sustained contribution to the performance, programming and advocacy of Australian works, and string music education | Won | |
| Ross McHenry (SA) | for trailblazing global pathways through artistic practice for South Australian musicians | Won | |
| David Wilfred & Daniel Wilfred (NT) | for cultural leadership and sustained creative contributions in Australia and beyond | Won | |
| Louise Devenish (WA) | for her ongoing advocacy, commissioning and performance of new percussion music in Western Australia | Won | |
| Making Waves (VIC) | for breaking down perceived state barriers and connecting a new generation of Australian musicians | Won | |
| Michael Kieran Harvey (TAS) | for supporting the Tasmanian new music community through teaching, performance and recording | Won | |
| Katie Noonan (QLD) | for The Glad Tomorrow and furthering the future of Queensland musicians | Won | |

== Screen Music Awards ==
=== Feature Film Score of the Year ===
| Title | Composer | Result | Ref. |
|---|---|---|---|
| Escape from Pretoria | David Hirschfelder | Nominated | |
| Nekrotronic | Michael Lira | Nominated | |
| True History of the Kelly Gang | Jed Kurzel | Won | |
| The Vigil | Michael Yezerski | Nominated | |

=== Best Music for an Advertisement ===
| Title | Composer | Result | Ref. |
|---|---|---|---|
| Georgetown Optician: "Eyes Say More Than Words" | Scott Langley | Won | |
| Klarna: "Get What I Love" | Brendan Tuckerman, Thandi Phoenix, Matt Ford, Jack Steele, Thomas Cardy | Nominated | |
| Nippon Steel: "Stuck on You" | Jonathan Dreyfus, Amy Andersen | Nominated | |
| Women with Agency: "Women Run" | Angie Coffey | Nominated | |

=== Best Music for Children's Television ===
| Title | Composer | Result | Ref. |
|---|---|---|---|
| Alice-Miranda: Friends Forever | Ryan Grogan | Nominated | |
| Bluey | Joff Bush | Nominated | |
| The Strange Chores | Joff Bush | Nominated | |
| Thalu | Ned Beckley, Josh Hogan | Won | |

=== Best Music for a Documentary ===
| Title | Composer | Result | Ref. |
|---|---|---|---|
| Bikram: Yogi, Guru, Predator | Cornel Wilczek, Pascal Babare | Nominated | |
| Machine | Matteo Zingales | Won | |
| Maralinga Tjarutja | Antony Partos | Nominated | |
| Quilty: Painting the Shadows | Damien Lane, Amanda Brown | Nominated | |

=== Best Music for a Mini-Series or Telemovie ===
| Title | Composer | Result | Ref. |
|---|---|---|---|
| The Commons | Roger Mason | Nominated | |
| Operation Buffalo | Antony Partos | Nominated | |
| Stateless | Cornel Wilczek, Tom Rouch, Pascal Babare | Nominated | |
| Unorthodox | Antonio Gambale | Won | |

=== Best Music for a Short Film ===
| Title | Composer | Result | Ref. |
|---|---|---|---|
| Bolzmann | Jonathan Dreyfus, Amy Andersen | Nominated | |
| The Hammerstone | Jackson Milas | Nominated | |
| I Want to Make a Film About Women | Caitlin Yeo | Nominated | |
| The Sand That Ate the Sea | Luke Howard | Won | |

=== Best Music for a Television Series or Serial ===
| Series or Serial | Composer | Result | Ref. |
|---|---|---|---|
| Everything's Gonna Be Ok | Bryony Marks | Nominated | |
| Glitch | Cornel Wilczek | Nominated | |
| The Secrets She Keeps | Amanda Brown | Won | |
| You Can't Ask That | Andrew Sampford | Nominated | |

=== Best Original Song Composed for the Screen ===
| Song title | Work | Composer | Result | Ref. |
|---|---|---|---|---|
| "Ballad of the Bridge-Builders" | The Skin of Others | David Bridie, Tom Murray | Won | |
| "Bear's Theme" | Bear: Koala Hero | Adam Gock, Brontë Horder, Mitch Stewart, Dinesh Wicks | Nominated | |
| "Carry You" | Upright | Tim Minchin | Nominated | |
| "Edge of Something" | Total Control | Missy Higgins, Antony Partos, Matteo Zingales | Nominated | |

=== Best Soundtrack Album ===
| Title | Composer | Result | Ref. |
|---|---|---|---|
| Hearts and Bones | Rafael May | Nominated | |
| Judy and Punch | François Tétaz | Won | |
| Lambs of God | Bryony Marks | Nominated | |
| The Letdown | Sally Seltmann, Darren Seltmann | Nominated | |

=== Best Television Theme ===
| Title | Composer | Result | Ref. |
|---|---|---|---|
| Thalu ("Ngarndu Ngurra") | Ned Beckley, Josh Hogan, Tyson Mowarin | Nominated | |
| Unorthodox | Antonio Gambale | Won | |
| Operation Buffalo | Antony Partos | Nominated | |
| The Commons | Roger Mason | Nominated | |

=== Most Performed Screen Composer – Australia ===
| Composer | Result | Ref. |
|---|---|---|
| Anthony El-Ammar | Nominated | |
| Adam Gock, Dinesh Wicks | Won | |
| Jay Stewart | Nominated | |
| Mitch Stewart | Nominated | |

=== Most Performed Screen Composer – Overseas ===
| Composer | Result | Ref. |
|---|---|---|
| Jed Kurzel | Nominated | |
| Michael Yezerski | Nominated | |
| Neil Sutherland | Won | |
| Nerida Tyson-Chew | Nominated | |

=== Distinguished Services to the Australian Screen ===
| Organisation / individual | Result | Ref. |
|---|---|---|
| Nerida Tyson-Chew | Won | |
