= Terrorizer (magazine) =

British extreme music magazine (1993–2018)

- Cover of the final issue of Terrorizer (#287) featuring At the Gates, May 2018
- Editor: Miranda Yardley
- Categories: Music
- Frequency: Every four weeks
- Circulation: 10,078 (2012)
- Publisher: Miranda Yardley
- First issue: October 1993; 33 years ago
- Final issue Number: May 2018; 8 years ago 287
- Company: Dark Arts Ltd.
- Country: United Kingdom
- Based in: London
- Website: terrorizer.com
- ISSN: 1350-6978

Terrorizer was an extreme music magazine published by Dark Arts Ltd. in the United Kingdom. It was released every four weeks with thirteen issues a year and featured a "Fear Candy" covermount CD, a twice yearly "Fear Candy Unsigned" CD, and a double-sided poster. It ceased publication in 2018 after nearly 25 years.

== History ==
=== 1993 ===
Terrorizer published its first issue in October 1993 with Sepultura on the cover and a price of £1.95. "Sure, the layout was a bit ropey, with several 'cut out'-style pictures in the live section and some horribly lo-fi video stills in the Pestilence feature, but what a line-up of bands! Sepultura, Morgoth, Entombed, Morbid Angel, At the Gates, Coroner, Dismember, Sinister, Death...it was a veritable smorgasbord of brutality."

The magazine's name derives from seminal grindcore band Terrorizer (which got the name from the death metal band Master's first demo in 1985) and as such the magazine was an early champion of the emerging death metal scene, a tradition that it carried on and expanded to include all sub-generes of heavy metal adopting the slogan "extreme music – no boundaries" in 2003 with issue 108.

=== 1994–1995 ===
Issue 11 saw Terrorizer celebrate its first birthday, covering hardcore punk in force with features on Suicidal Tendencies, Madball, Chaos UK and Pro-Pain. "There was a sense that the team were finally properly honouring the magazine's original pledge to cover all forms of extreme music."

In 1994, death metal began to get wider acceptance in the mainstream metal press, but black metal continued to be vilified or ridiculed, or both, creating a gap that Terrorizer filled by giving pages to bands like Enslaved, Emperor and Dissection, whilst the demo reviews continued to beat the trend, getting first listens of Behemoth and Amon Amarth.

The first covermount CD, entitled Noize Pollution 3 (the first two having been cassettes), appeared on issue 23 in 1995 and featured At the Gates, Six Feet Under, In Flames, Moonspell and Dissection. That year, Terrorizer also launched two phone services, "Deathline" and "Metal Mates", that were swiftly discontinued. "The former was a number you could call to actually listen to the whole of the interviews you'd read snippets of in the magazine, and the latter where you could register your personal details with a metal matchmaking agency."

=== 1996–1998 ===
With issue 28 in 1996, Nick Terry replaced Rob Clymo as editor and the issue saw a Burzum artwork poster. With issue 29, the new editor overhauled and expanded the album reviews, live reviews and introduced a black metal news column.

Terrorizer released its first cover mounted CD on its December 1998 issue and did so every four months until 2001, which it was released every two months. From 2002, every issue came with a CD.

=== 1999–2018 ===
Terrorizer produced a Christmas show in 1999 with Hecate Enthroned and Akercocke supporting Morbid Angel at The Astoria 2 in London. In late 2000, Jonathan Selzer replaced Nick Terry as editor and 2001 saw a doom metal revival with coverage of Cathedral and Spirit Caravan so intensive that British doom metallers Warning split up following an argument inspired by quotes in their Terrorizer interview that year.

In September 2007, Jonathan Selzer left Terrorizer for Metal Hammer, and was replaced as editor by Joseph Stannard, the magazine's news editor until that time. Former Rock Sound and Kerrang! staffer Darren Sadler became editor after previous editor Louise Brown left Terrorizer to create the specialist heavy metal magazine Iron Fist.

The magazine's last issue (287) was released in June 2018 and its publisher Dark Arts Ltd. was dissolved in January 2019. Lack of communication about the closure of Terrorizer caused controversy with subscribers who had not been informed of the impending demise. There was additional controversy as, despite the lack of publication, subscribers were still being charged.

== John Peel ==
British radio DJ John Peel, famously a champion of death metal and grindcore, mentioned the magazine in an episode of Home Truths on BBC Radio 4. "...I took several copies of a music magazine called 'Terrorizer' out of my luggage before leaving for New Zealand via Los Angeles in 2002 and given the hostility of the officials we encountered in California I'd say we did the right thing..."

== Writers ==
Terrorizer's pool of writers included former Stampin' Ground bassist Ian Glasper, who has also written three books on UK punk, Burning Britain: The History of UK Punk, 1980–1984, The Day the Country Died: A History of Anarcho Punk 1980–1984 and Trapped in a Scene: UK Hardcore 1985–1989, author and ghostwriter Paul Stenning, former Cradle of Filth keyboard player Damien (aka Greg Moffitt), comedy writer and Moss drummer Chris Chantler and guest columns from Fenriz, Today Is the Day's Steve Austin, Amon Amarth's Johan Hegg, Brutal Truth's Kevin Sharp and the Haunted's Peter Dolving.
