= Waiting (Kian song) =

Single by Kian

from the EP Bliss
- Written: 2016
- Released: 18 July 2018 (see below)
- Recorded: 2017–2018
- Length: 3:35
- Label: Kian (independent): EMI; Republic
- Composers: Kian Brownfield; Jerome Farah
- Lyricists: Brownfield; Farah
- Producers: Brownfield; Farah

Kian singles chronology
"Too Far Gone" (2018)	"Waiting" (2018)	"Childism" (2019)

Alternative cover
- Re-release cover

Music video
- "Waiting" on YouTube

"Waiting" is a song by Australian singer-songwriter Kian, released independently on 18 July 2018, before later being re-released by EMI Music Australia and Republic Records on 30 November 2018.

"Waiting" peaked at number 15 on the ARIA Singles Chart and was certified 3× Platinum in Australia in 2019.

"Waiting" has been the recipient of various awards and nominations, winning Kian the 2018 Triple J Unearthed High Competition, Most Performed Australian Work of the Year and Most Performed Alternative Work of the Year at the 2020 APRA Music Awards, and receiving a nomination for Song of the Year at the 2019 ARIA Awards.

== Background and release ==
Brownfield first emerged as the featured vocalist on the chorus of Baker Boy's debut single "Cloud 9", in 2017. Kian's subsequently released his debut single "Too Far Gone", a collaboration with Vince the Kid, in 2018.

The song was written by Brownfield, aged 14, alongside Melbourne songwriter and producer Jerome Farah in 2016, and recorded in 2017–2018. Brownfield subsequently independently released "Waiting" on 18 July 2018. Brownfield said of the song: "It's about that feeling of uncertainty when you don't know if they like you back – I know it's childish but I reckon everyone has found themselves in this insecure hole at some point in their lives no matter what age. Hidden within the lyrics are some things that relate to me personally along with metaphorical things to move the story along."

On 15 August 2018, the song was announced as the winner of the 2018 Triple J Unearthed High Competition. In November 2018, Kian signed a new recording deal with EMI Music Australia and Universal's Republic Records, who handled global distribution outside of Australia. "Waiting" was subsequently re-released on 30 November 2018.

== Commercial performance ==
"Waiting" was certified 3× Platinum in Australia on 11 November 2019, for shipments exceeding 210,000 track-equivalent units.

== Music video ==
The music video for "Waiting" was released on 19 July 2018.

== Awards and nominations ==
=== APRA Awards ===
Year	Nominee / work	Award	Result	Ref.
2020	"Waiting": (Kian Brownfield; Jerome Farah)	Most Performed Australian Work of the Year	Won	
2020	"Waiting": (Kian Brownfield; Jerome Farah)	Most Performed Alternative Work of the Year	Won	

=== ARIA Awards ===
Year	Nominee / work	Award	Result	Ref.
2019	"Waiting"	Song of the Year	Nominated	

=== Unearthed High ===
Year	Nominee / work	Award	Result	Ref.
2018	"Waiting"	Triple J Unearthed High Competition	Won	

== Personnel ==
- Kian Brownfield – composition, lyrics, production
- Jerome Farah – composition, lyrics, production

== Charts ==
=== Weekly charts ===
Weekly chart performance for "Waiting"
Chart (2018–2019)	Peak position
Australia (ARIA)	15

=== Year-end charts ===
Year-end chart performance for "Waiting"
Chart (2019)	Position
Australia (ARIA)	38

== Certifications ==
Certifications for "Waiting"
Region	Certification	Certified units/sales
Australia (ARIA)	3× Platinum	210,000^{‡}
^{‡} Sales+streaming figures based on certification alone.

== Release history ==
Release dates and formats for "Waiting"
Region	Date	Format	Label	Ref.
Australia	18 July 2018	Digital download	Kian (independent)	
Various	30 November 2018 (re-release)	Digital download; streaming	EMI; Republic	
