= Ruby Fields =

Australian musician

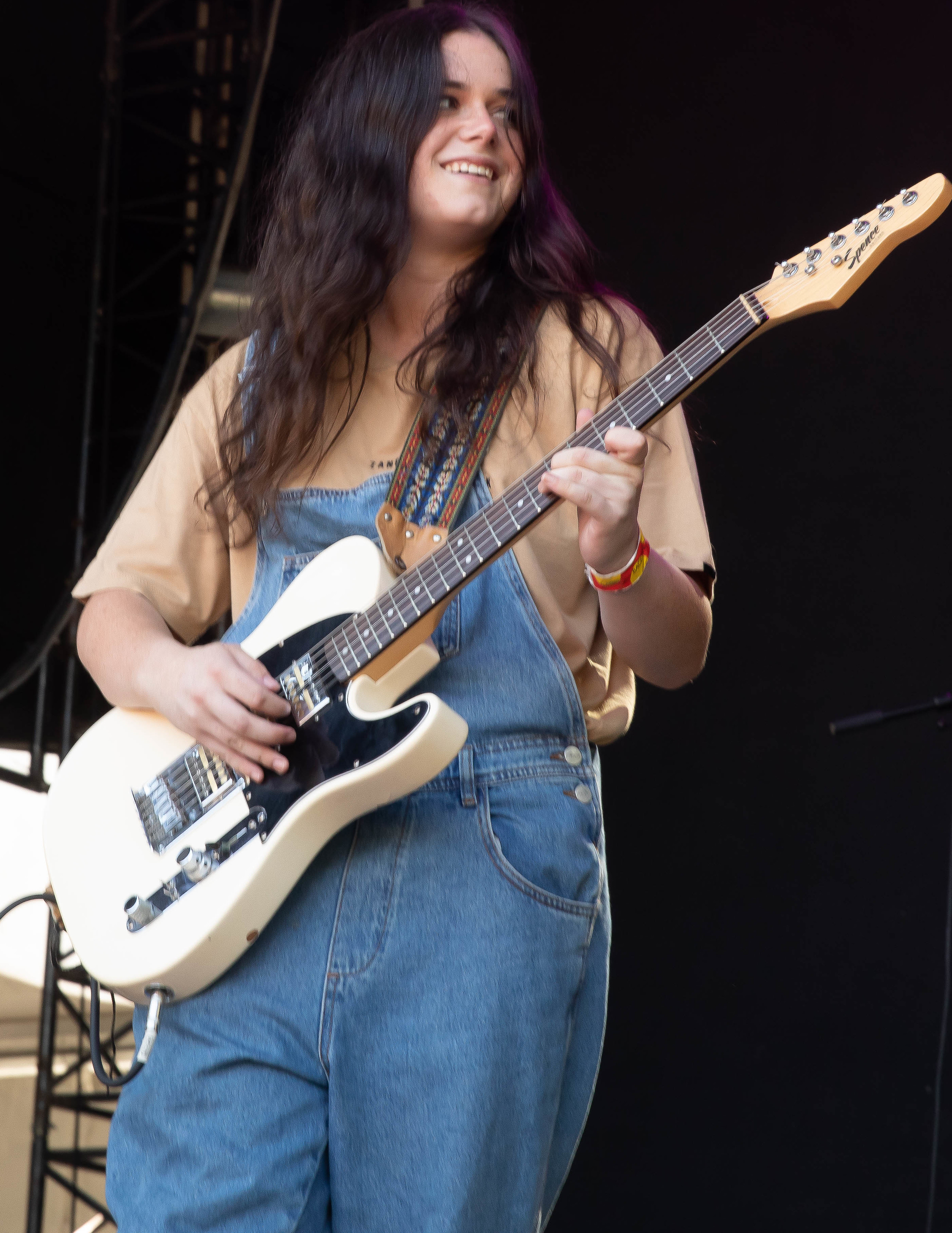
- Ruby Fields performing at St Jerome's Laneway Festival, 2019

Background information
- Born: Ruby Phillips
- Origin: Cronulla, New South Wales, Australia
- Genres: Indie rock, punk rock
- Occupations: Singer-songwriter, guitarist
- Instruments: Vocals, guitar
- Years active: 2016–present
- Website: www.rubyfields.com

Ruby Phillips, known professionally as Ruby Fields, is an Australian singer-songwriter and guitarist from Cronulla, New South Wales. In 2018, she released her debut EP Your Dad's Opinion for Dinner, followed by the singles "I Want", "P Plates", and "Ritalin". Her single "Dinosaurs" reached number nine on Triple J's Hottest 100 of 2018.

In 2019, she released her second EP Permanent Hermit, which contained the singles "Dinosaurs", "Climate", and "Trouble". Her debut album Been Doin' It for a Bit was released in September 2021 and debuted atop the ARIA Albums Chart.

Fields' second studio album Small Achievements was released in April 2026.

== Early life ==
Fields' hometown is Cronulla in southern Sydney. She began songwriting when she was 11 and busking when she was 13. Fields spent several years learning how to build guitars and repair music equipment from her friend's father. She grew up listening to bands such as AC/DC, Fleetwood Mac, and Guns N' Roses.

== Music career ==
=== 2016–2018: Early years and Your Dad's Opinion for Dinner ===
Since 2016, Fields has been performing live with supporting band members; Adam Newling on lead guitar, Tas Wilson on bass guitar, and Patrick Rogers on drums.

In 2017, Fields uploaded her debut single "I Want" to the Triple J Unearthed website, which was played on nationwide radio station Triple J on the same day. The track, along with her follow-up single "P Plates", reached the top 200 in the Triple J Hottest 100, 2017.

Fields performed at The Plot 2017 and South by Southwest 2018. She also supported Ball Park Music and San Cisco on tour in 2018, and performed at St Jerome's Laneway Festival in 2019.

=== 2019: Permanent Hermit ===
On 27 January 2019, her song "Dinosaurs" reached number 9 in Triple J's Hottest 100 of 2018. In March 2019, Fields released "Climate" and announced the release of her second EP Permanent Hermit, which was released on the 3 May 2019.

For a week in July 2019, Fields took over the triple j Breakfast radio show slot, replacing regular hosts Ben Harvey and Liam Stapleton.

=== 2020-present: Been Doin' It for a Bit and Live from Repentance Creek Hall ===
In 2020, Fields released "Pretty Grim" and in April 2021, "R.E.G.O.", the second single from her forthcoming debut studio album.

In July 2021, Fields released "Song About a Boy", before releasing her debut album Been Doin' It for a Bit on 24 September 2021. Been Doin' It for a Bit debuted at number 1 on the ARIA Charts. In February 2022, Fields released Live from Repentance Creek Hall featuring live recordings from Been Doin' It for a Bit.

=== 2023–present: Small Achievements ===
Fields released her second studio album Small Achievements on 24 April 2026. The album will be supported with an Australian tour through April and May 2026.

== Discography ==
=== Studio albums ===
List of studio albums, with release date and label shown
Title	Album details	Peak chart positions
Title	Album details	AUS
Been Doin' It for a Bit	Released: 24 September 2021; Label: Space 44 (S44CD0009) / Flightless Records (FLTD-002); Formats: CD, LP, cassette, digital download, streaming	1
Small Achievements	Released: 24 April 2026; Label: Ruby Fields (RFDD001); Formats: LP, digital download, streaming	29

=== Extended plays ===
List of EPs, with selected chart positions shown
Title	Details	Peak chart positions
Title	Details	AUS
Your Dad's Opinion for Dinner	Released: 1 March 2018; Label: Ruby Fields; Formats: Digital download, streaming, LP	26 (Note: A physical release combined both EPs, as did ARIA's chart listing.)
Permanent Hermit	Released: 3 May 2019; Label: Ruby Fields; Formats: Digital download, streaming, LP	26
Live from Repentance Creek Hall	Released: 16 February 2022; Label: Ruby Fields; Formats: Digital download, streaming	—

=== Singles ===
List of singles, with year released, selected certifications, and album name shown
Title	Year	Peak chart positions	Certifications	Album
Title	Year	NZ Hot	Certifications	Album
"I Want"	2017	—		Your Dad's Opinion for Dinner
"P Plates"	2017	—		Your Dad's Opinion for Dinner
"Ritalin"	2018	—		Your Dad's Opinion for Dinner
"Dinosaurs"	2018	—	ARIA: Platinum	Permanent Hermit
"The Unguarded Moment" (Triple J Like a Version)	2019	—		Non-album single (Note: Later included on the 2025 compilation Triple J's Best Australian Like A Version)
"Climate"	2019	—		Permanent Hermit
"Trouble"	2019	—		Permanent Hermit
"Pretty Grim"	2020	—		Been Doin' It for a Bit
"R.E.G.O."	2021	—		Been Doin' It for a Bit
"Song About a Boy"	2021	—		Been Doin' It for a Bit
"Bottle-O"	2021	—		Been Doin' It for a Bit
"92 Purebred"	2025	—		Small Achievements
"Half the Laugh"	2025	—		Small Achievements
"Tacklebox"	2025	31		Small Achievements
"Muscle"	2026			Small Achievements
"Mikey Echo"	2026			Small Achievements

== Awards ==
=== APRA Awards ===
The APRA Awards are held in Australia and New Zealand by the Australasian Performing Right Association to recognise songwriting skills, sales and airplay performance by its members annually. Fields has been nominated for one award.

Year	Nominee / work	Award	Result
2020	"Dinosaurs"	Most Performed Rock Work of the Year	Nominated

=== J Awards ===
The J Awards are an annual series of Australian music awards that were established by the Australian Broadcasting Corporation's youth-focused radio station Triple J. They commenced in 2005.

Year	Nominee / work	Award	Result	Ref.
J Awards of 2017	Ruby Fields	Unearthed Artist of the Year	Nominated	
J Awards of 2021	Been Doin' It for a Bit	Australian Album of the Year	Nominated	

=== National Live Music Awards ===
The National Live Music Awards (NLMAs) are a broad recognition of Australia's diverse live industry, celebrating the success of the Australian live scene. The awards commenced in 2016.

Year	Nominee / work	Award	Result
National Live Music Awards of 2020	Ruby Fields	NSW Act Voice of the Year	Nominated

=== Rolling Stone Australia Awards ===
The Rolling Stone Australia Awards are awarded annually in January or February by the Australian edition of Rolling Stone magazine for outstanding contributions to popular culture in the previous year.

Year	Nominee / work	Award	Result	Ref.
2022	Been Doin' It for a Bit	Best Record	Nominated	
