= Triple One =

Australian rap music group

- Origin: Sydney, Australia
- Genres: Hip hop; rap
- Years active: 2016–present
- Labels: Sony Music Australia; Triple One Records
- Members: Billy Gunns; Marty Bugatti; Obi Ill Terrors; Lil Dijon
- Website: tripleonemusic.com

Triple One are a hip hop/rap group from Inner West Sydney, Australia. Members include Lil Dijon (vocalist), Marty Bugatti and Obi Ill Terrors (rappers), and Billy Gunns (production).

They are best known for their single "Butter", which reached high rotation on Australian youth radio station Triple J. They released the EP The Libertine 2 in June 2019.

In November 2021, the band released "Come Over" and announced their first regional tour of Australia.

== Band members ==
Current

- Lil Dijon – vocals (2016–present)
- Marty Bugatti Large – rap vocals (2016–present)
- Obi Ill Terrors – rap vocals (2016–present)
- Billy Gunns – production (2016–present)

== Discography ==
=== Studio albums ===
List of studio albums, with release date and label shown
Title	Album details	Peak chart positions
Title	Album details	AUS
Panic Force	Released: 30 October 2020; Label: Triple One; Formats: CD, LP, digital download, streaming	8

=== Mixed tapes ===
List of mixed tapes, with release date and label shown
Title	Details
A Dangerous Method Vol. 1	Released: 8 April 2022; Label: Triple One; Formats: Digital download, streaming

=== Extended plays ===
List of extended plays, with release date and label shown
Title	Details
The Libertine	Released: 3 March 2017; Label: Triple One; Formats: Digital download, streaming
The Naughty Corner	Released: 22 March 2018; Label: Triple One; Formats: Digital download, streaming
The Libertine 2	Released: 21 June 2019; Label: Triple One; Formats: Digital download, streaming

=== Certified singles ===
List of certified singles as lead artist, with selected certifications shown
Title	Year	Certifications	Album
"Showoff"	2018	ARIA: Gold	Non-album singles
"Butter"	2019	ARIA: Platinum	Non-album singles
"So Easy" (featuring Matt Corby and Kwame)	2019	ARIA: Gold	Non-album singles

== Awards ==
=== APRA Awards ===
The APRA Awards are held in Australia and New Zealand by the Australasian Performing Right Association to recognise songwriting skills, sales and airplay performance by its members annually. Triple One has been nominated for one award.

Year	Nominee / work	Award	Result
2020	"Butter"	Most Performed Urban Work of the Year	Nominated

=== J Awards ===
The J Awards are an annual series of Australian music awards that were established by the Australian Broadcasting Corporation's youth-focused radio station Triple J. They commenced in 2005.

Year	Nominee / work	Award	Result	Ref.
J Awards of 2021	"Blood Rave" (directed by Serwah Attafuah)	Australian Video of the Year	Nominated	

=== Rolling Stone Australia Awards ===
The Rolling Stone Australia Awards are awarded annually in January or February by the Australian edition of Rolling Stone magazine for outstanding contributions to popular culture in the previous year.

Year	Nominee / work	Award	Result	Ref.
2021	"Salina"	Best Single	Nominated	
