= Triple J Unearthed =

- Australia
- Frequencies: DAB+; DVB-T: Ch. 29; online

Programming
- Language: English
- Format: Independent Australian music
- Network: ABC Radio

Ownership
- Owner: Australian Broadcasting Corporation
- Sister stations: Triple J, Double J, Hottest

History
- Founded: 1995 (talent competition); 2006 (online platform); 2011 (digital radio station)
- First air date: 5 October 2011; 15 years ago

Links
- Webcast: Live stream
- Website: triplejunearthed.com

Triple J Unearthed is an Australian digital radio station and online music discovery platform. It is a sister station of Triple J, owned by the Australian Broadcasting Corporation.

Unearthed began in 1995 as a regional talent competition open to unsigned musicians. In 2006, the Unearthed website was launched as a way for local artists to have their music heard by the station's team and listeners. As of 2023, the platform hosts over 170,000 tracks from over 85,000 independent musicians. Its success led to the launch of a dedicated digital radio station in 2011, which only plays Australian music uploaded to the site.

Cited as a "revolutionary idea" that "arguably changed the entire Australian music landscape," the Unearthed brand has been responsible for discovering some of Australia's most celebrated musical acts, including Flume, Missy Higgins, Vance Joy, Gang of Youths, Grinspoon and the Kid Laroi. The network continues to host initiatives to progress independent artists in the industry, including Unearthed High, an annual award given to high school musicians to have their work recorded professionally.

== Formats ==
=== Talent competition ===
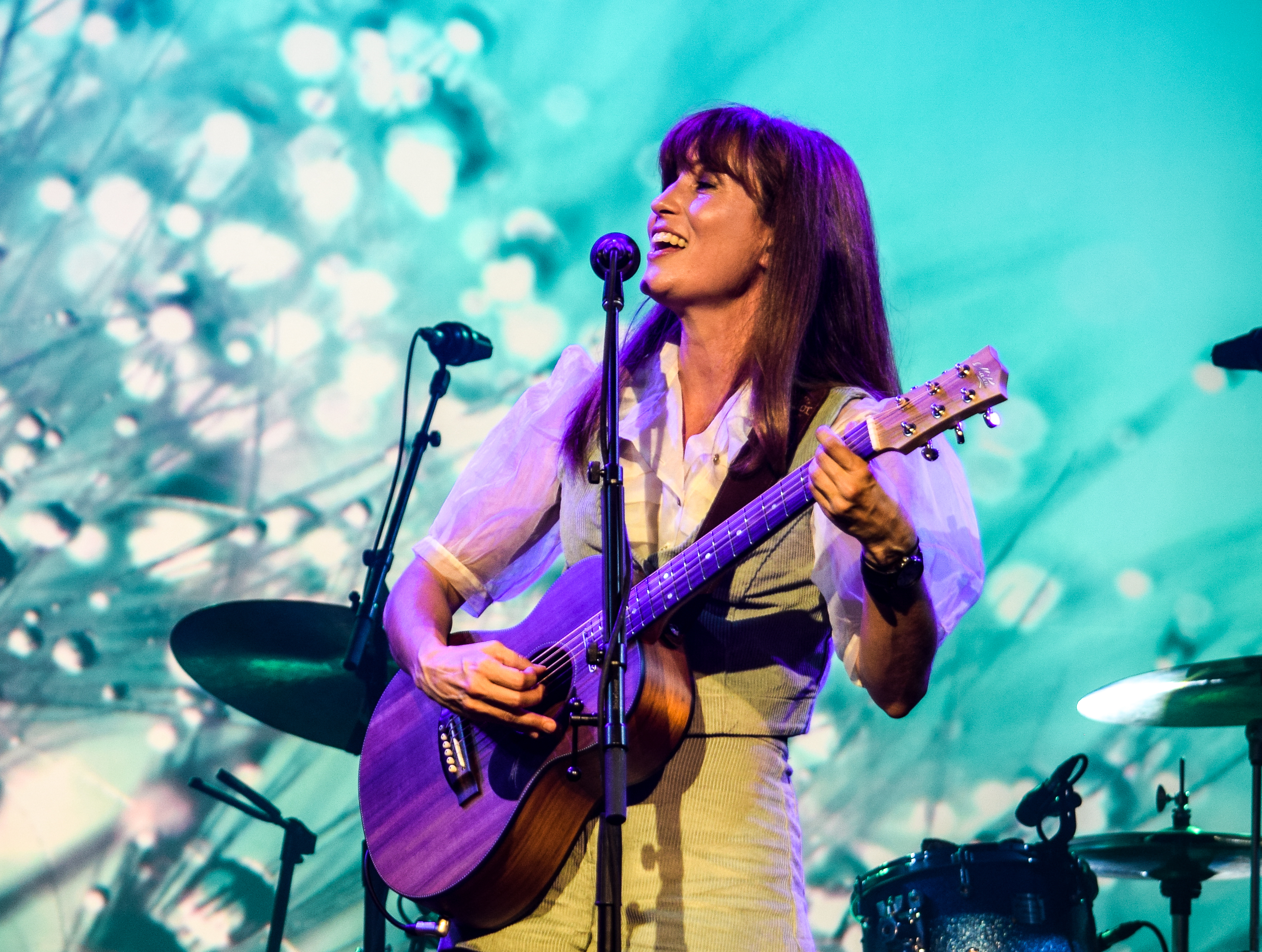
Missy Higgins says her 2001 Unearthed success led to her initial record deal and subsequent success.

In July 1995, Triple J launched its regional Unearthed competition, whereby emerging musicians from across Australia could send in their demos to be professionally recorded and played on the station. In its inaugural year, 1,000 artists entered; Lismore rock band Grinspoon won the competition.

In its following years, the Unearthed demo program helped discover several acclaimed artists, including Killing Heidi (1996) and Missy Higgins (2001). By 2006, Triple J had travelled to over 43 regions in Australia and "unearthed" over 100 artists, most of whom went on to independently release albums and score distribution deals.

=== Website ===
In 2006, former Triple J manager Linda Bracken ideated an online platform that would allow unsigned musicians to upload their music and be heard by the station's staff and listeners. Motivated to cut out the need for publicists and A&R, she was inspired by the similar New Music Canada initiative by CBC Radio 3.

With funding from the Australia Council for the Arts, Bracken and software engineer Ann Chesterman, who saw the idea as "being at the heart of the ecosystem of Australian music," built a prototype for the Unearthed website. The site's launch, on 9 August 2006, re-established the Unearthed brand. Thousands of tracks were uploaded within the first week of the site being online. By 2010, about 100 songs were being uploaded onto the Unearthed website every day. As of 2023, it hosts over 170,000 tracks from over 85,000 independent musicians.

In 2021, the website received its first major redesign since its initial launch.

On 18 December 2024, the New South Wales Police Force alleged that two men used the Unearthed website, particularly its profile customisation features, like writing a user bio, to recruit a Goulburn Correctional Centre inmate to carry out a stabbing on gang leader Bassam Hamzy in February that year. The Australian Broadcasting Corporation, which owns Triple J, did not comment on the matter.

=== Digital radio station ===
Seeing the success of the website, Unearthed executive producer Stephanie Carrick and ABC music director Chris Scaddan ideated creating a dedicated digital radio station to accompany the online platform. It was launched on 5 October 2011, on digital radio in the five major Australian capital cities, and via the Unearthed website.

== Programs ==
Triple J Unearthed broadcasts several programs each week, each consisting entirely of music uploaded to the website.

- Tops: the best new music uploaded to the website; weekdays 5:30–6:30pm
- New Music Hour: new music uploaded to the website; hosted by Claire Mooney, Monday 10–11am

There are also several genre-specific programs, including:

- Always: new music from Indigenous Australian artists; hosted by Nooky
- Cadence: hip-hop and R&B; hosted by Jerry Agbinya
- Crush: pop music; hosted by Andy Gavrilovic
- Drift: guitar-driven music; hosted by Claire Mooney
- Flow State: chill and ambient music; hosted by Claire Mooney
- In the Pit: heavy music and rock; hosted by Lauren Guerrera
- Slow Burn: folk and country music; hosted by Sara Glaidous
- Spiral: experimental and underground music; hosted by Tommy Faith
- Warehouse: electronic, dance and club music; hosted by Kailyn Crabbe

== Initiatives ==
=== Unearthed High ===
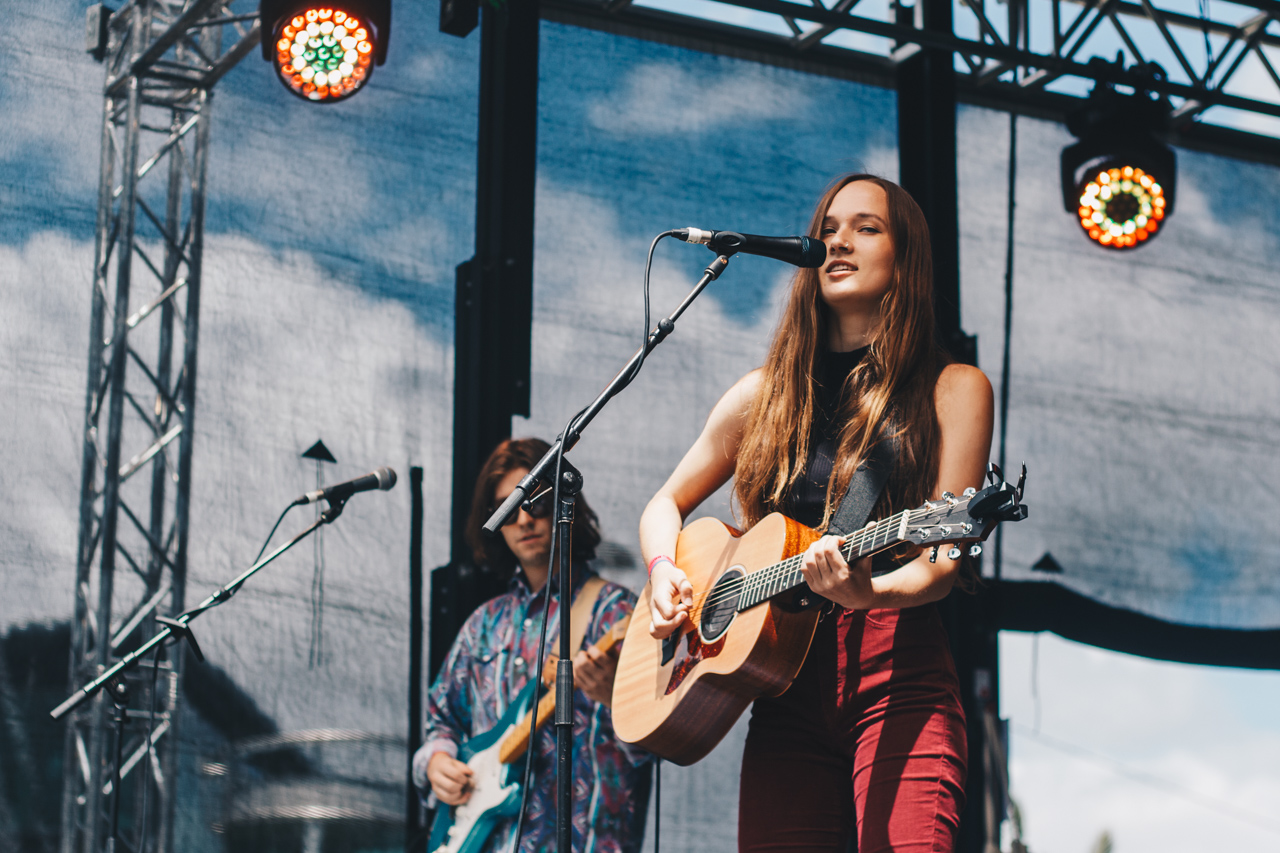
Gretta Ray won Unearthed High in 2016 and has since released two ARIA-charting albums.

Every year since 2008, Triple J Unearthed has held a competition aimed at musicians and bands in high school. The winner receives mentoring, recording opportunities and airplay on Triple J. Recent acts to have found success with the initiative include Hockey Dad, The Kid Laroi, Genesis Owusu, Japanese Wallpaper and Gretta Ray.

The Unearthed High Indigenous Initiative was founded in 2016, rewarding an Aboriginal or Torres Strait Islander musician with mentoring and airplay on Triple J.

Celebrating 15 years of the competition in 2023, Triple J held a one-night, all-ages concert during Vivid Sydney featuring notable past entrants, including Lastlings and Teen Jesus and the Jean Teasers.

List of Unearthed High winners, selected finalists and Indigenous Initiative winners
Year	Winner	Notable finalists	Indigenous Initiative winner	Ref.
2008	Tom Ugly (Note: Formerly known as [is] when they won the competition.)			
2009	Hunting Grounds (Note: Formerly known as Howl when they won the competition.)			
2010	Stonefield (Note: Formerly known as Iotah when they won the competition.)			
2011	Snakadaktal			
2012	Asta	Montaigne		
2013	Lunatics on Pogosticks	Vancouver Sleep Clinic		
2014	Japanese Wallpaper	Hockey Dad		
2015	Mosquito Coast	Genesis Owusu		
2016	Gretta Ray	Lastlings, Ninajirachi	Tia Gostelow	
2017	Arno Faraji	Ninajirachi	Becca Hatch	
2018	Kian	The Kid Laroi	River & Isles	
2019	George Alice		Aodhan	
2020	Teenage Joans	Aodhan	Rudeboy E	
2021	The Rions		Kayps	
2022	Jacoténe		Proud Noongar Boys	
2023	Lee		Inkabee	
2024	Mariae Cassandra		Riah	
2025	Drizzz		Kyla Belle	
2026	Trophy Wyfe		TooLa	

=== Indigenous opportunities ===
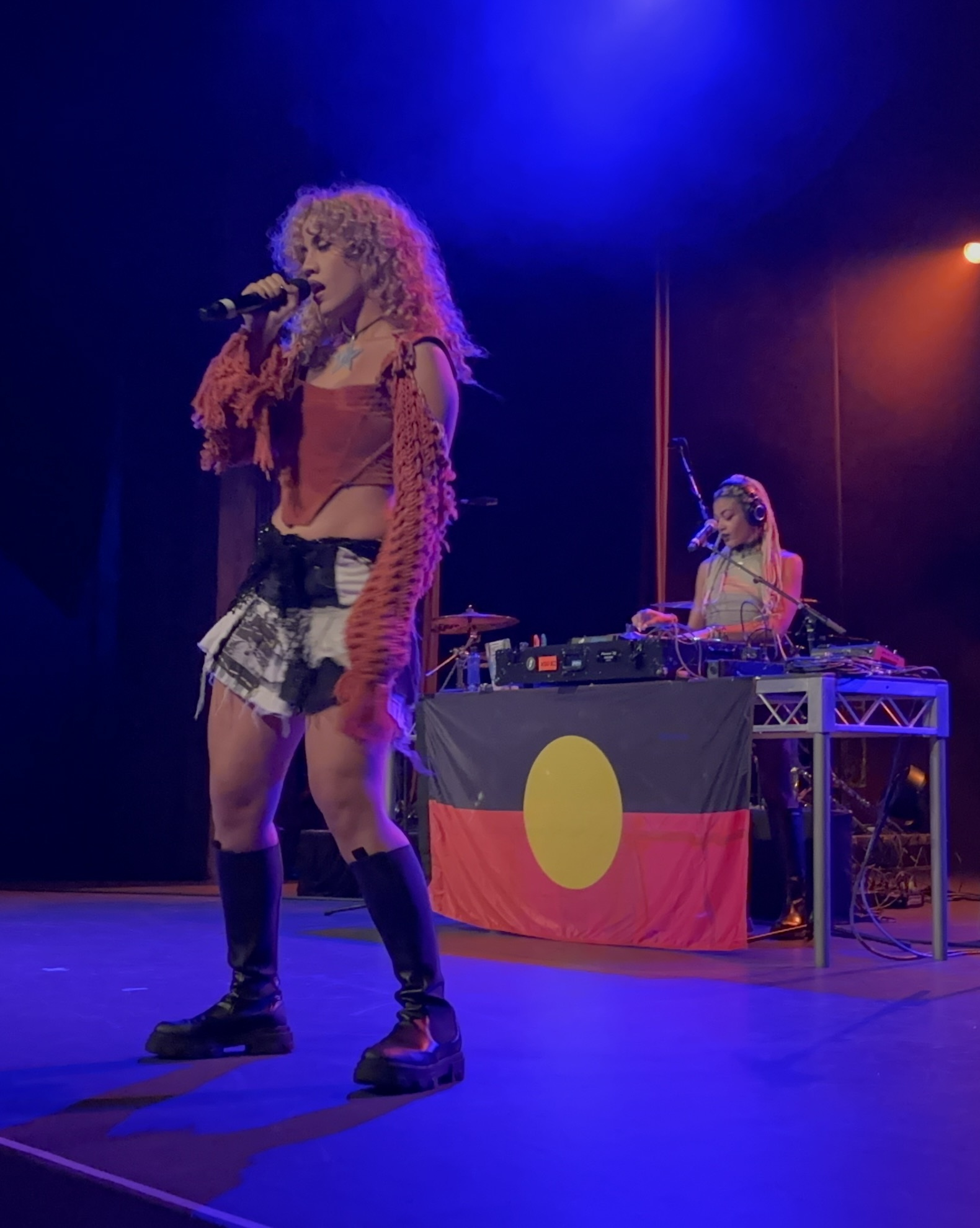
Becca Hatch won the Unearthed High Indigenous Initiative in 2017.

As an extension of Unearthed High, the Indigenous Initiative commemorates the best First Nations artist. Notable past winners have included Aodhan (2019), Becca Hatch (2017) and Tia Gostelow (2016). The network also holds an annual competition open to Indigenous Australian artists, with the winner selected to play at the National Indigenous Music Awards. Past winners have included Thelma Plum, Baker Boy, Alice Skye and Dallas Woods. Unearthed has also run a number of First Nations specific competitions that has seen artists added to festivals such as First & Forever and Treaty Day Out.

=== Concert lineup additions ===
Triple J often holds competitions that see a winning Unearthed artist join a major music festival's lineup. In the past, winners have performed at Splendour in the Grass, Groovin' the Moo, Falls Festival, Big Day Out, Laneway Festival and A More Perfect Union. The station have also held contests to support international artists like Denzel Curry on their Australian tours.

=== Artist collaboration competitions ===
Unearthed occasionally run competitions where winning artists can work with renowned producers or songwriters. In 2023, Flume released a half-finished track, and Unearthed artists were encouraged to share how they would complete the song to win – the final track, produced by Blacktown rapper Isaac Puerile, received national airplay. The same year, Unearthed artists were given the opportunity to work with award-winning songwriter Sarah Aarons.

In the past, these competitions have also seen entrants remix songs from Lorde and DMA's, as well as creating "DIY supergroups" out of samples from notable artists provided by Triple J.

=== COVID-19 grants ===
In June 2020, amidst the COVID-19 pandemic, Unearthed handed out 16 grants to artists on the platform valued at $7,000 each, to record new music, produce music videos and promote their work.

== Impact ==
Writing for online magazine Tone Deaf in 2022, Holley Gawne wrote Triple J Unearthed has been "so successful ... in boosting the profiles of some of the industry’s biggest and brightest." Triple J music director Dave Ruby Howe said the Unearthed online platform was a revolutionary idea, especially as it pre-dated other music platforms like SoundCloud and Bandcamp.

=== Notable alumni ===
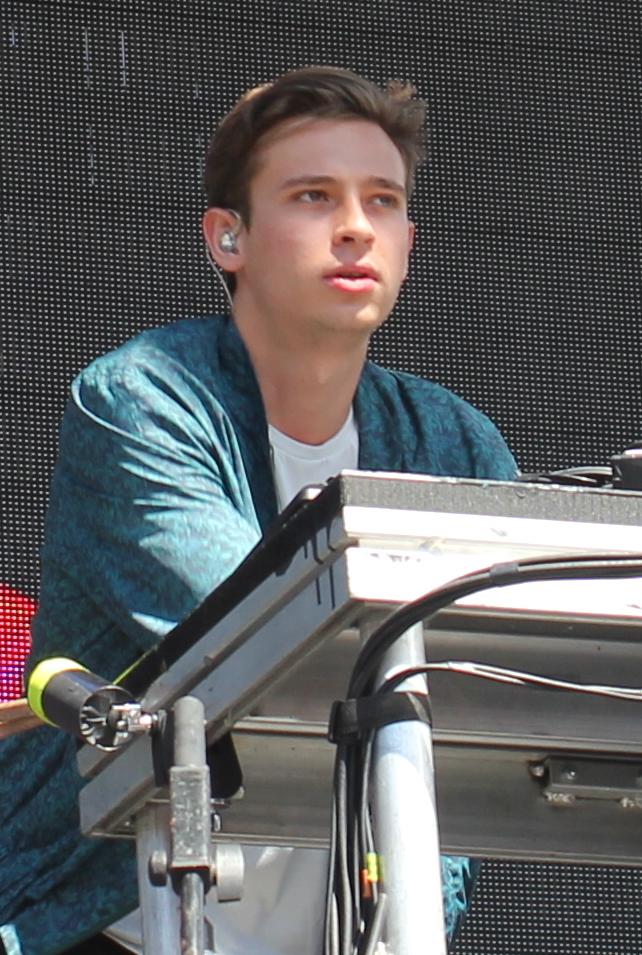
Flume originally uploaded his debut single to the Unearthed website.

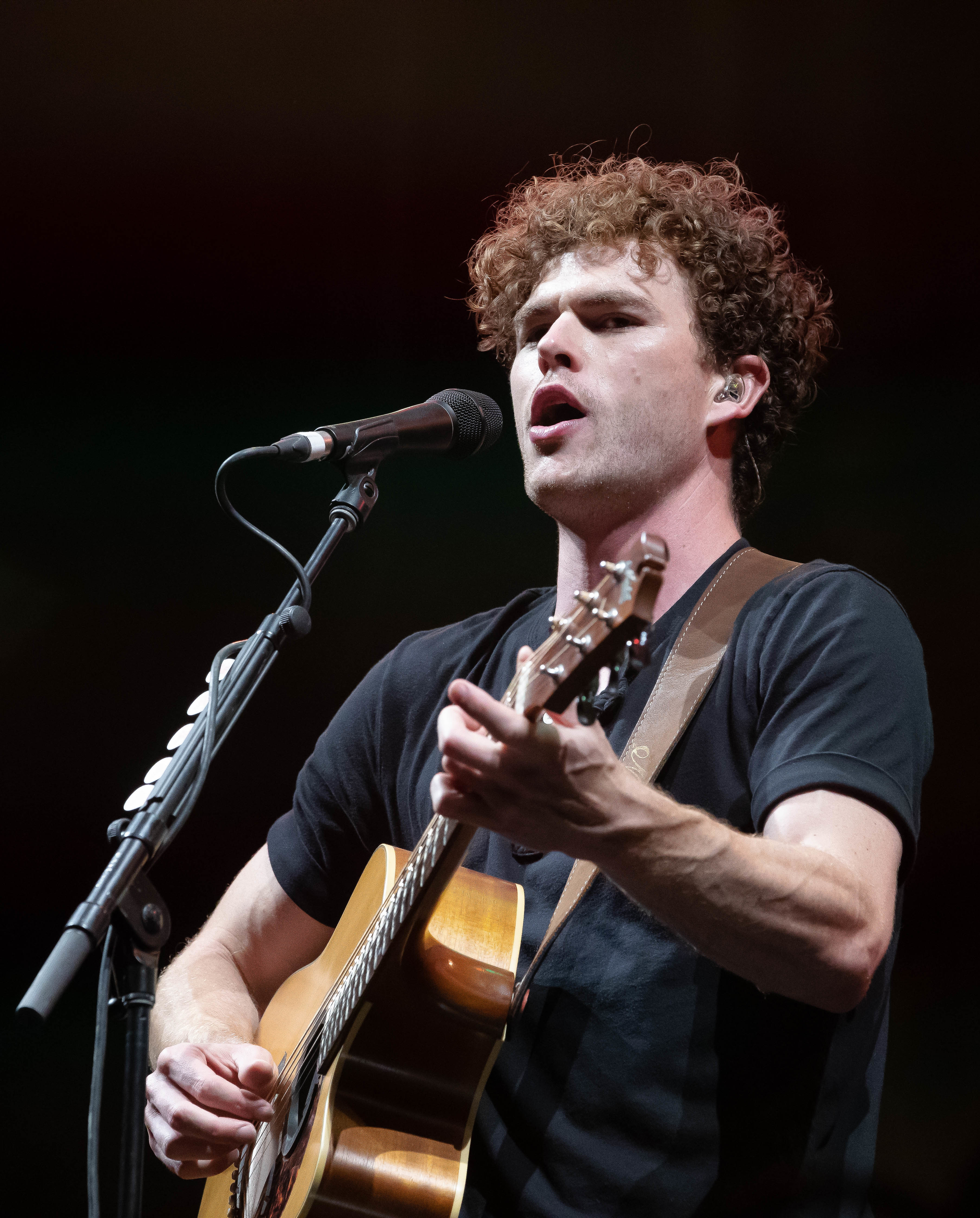
"Riptide" by Vance Joy received early success on Unearthed.

In its first form as a regional talent competition, Unearthed discovered then-local musicians Missy Higgins and Sophie Koh, and bands Grinspoon, Killing Heidi and Sick Puppies.

The launch of the website led to the rise of hundreds of more artists and according to The Music, "arguably changed the entire Australian music landscape." Flume, one of the "world's most prominent producers" according to Rolling Stone, debuted with a single on Unearthed titled "Possum" in 2011. Brisbane indie pop band Ball Park Music began uploading to the site in 2008, while Gang of Youths uploaded a demo as well as their debut single "Evangelists" in 2013.

When a then-unsigned Vance Joy uploaded "Riptide" to the platform, Howe said his team played the track "about 100 times on Unearthed radio" prior to its enormous success – the track is now certified 16× platinum and ended up polling at number one in the Hottest 100 of 2013.

On February 15, 2019 Tones and I uploaded her debut single "Johnny Run Away" to Triple J Unearthed. The track was picked up by the team, and Tones and I would go on to win an Unearthed competition to perform at Splendour in the Grass. Her hit 2019 single "Dance Monkey" has since become the most streamed Australian song, and the most streamed song by a female musician on Spotify, recording over three billion streams.

=== 100 Best Unearthed Discoveries ===
In November 2016, to celebrate 10 years of the Triple J Unearthed website, the broadcaster counted down the 100 Best Unearthed Discoveries, featuring artists who have found the most success after uploading their music to the platform. In the week following the Triple J Hottest 100 of Australian Songs in July 2025, the Unearthed station revisited this list.

Top 10 artists from the 100 Best Unearthed Discoveries list
No.	2016 list	2025 list
1	Flume	Missy Higgins
2	Courtney Barnett	Rüfüs Du Sol
3	The Rubens	Gang of Youths
4	Boy & Bear	Spacey Jane
5	Meg Mac	Flume
6	Ball Park Music	Ball Park Music
7	The Jezabels	Ocean Alley
8	Sticky Fingers	Vance Joy
9	Big Scary	Sticky Fingers
10	Japanese Wallpaper	Grinspoon
