= J Awards of 2021 =

17th Annual J Awards

- Date: 18 November 2021
- Venue: Australia
- Website: abc.net.au/triplej

The J Awards of 2021 are the seventeenth annual J Awards, established by the Australian Broadcasting Corporation's youth-focused radio station Triple J.

The eligibility period for releases took place between November 2020 and October 2021. The nominations were announced on 1 November 2021. The winners were announced on 18 November 2021 with Genesis Owusu winning two awards.

== Awards ==
=== Australian Album of the Year ===
The nominees for albums, chosen for their creativity, musicianship and contribution to Australian music.

List of Australian Album of the Year nominees
Artist	Album	Result
Amyl and the Sniffers	Comfort to Me	Nominated
The Avalanches	We Will Always Love You	Nominated
Baker Boy	Gela	Nominated
Genesis Owusu	Smiling with No Teeth	Won
Gretta Ray	Begin to Look Around	Nominated
Holy Holy	Hello My Beautiful World	Nominated
Middle Kids	Today We're The Greatest	Nominated
Ruby Fields	Been Doin' It for a Bit	Nominated
Rüfüs Du Sol	Surrender	Nominated
Tones and I	Welcome to the Madhouse	Nominated

=== Double J Artist of the Year ===
The artists who impressed Double J with their musical excellence and contribution to Australian music.

List of Double J Artist of the Year nominees
Artist	Result
Amyl and the Sniffers	Nominated
The Avalanches	Won
Emma Donovan & The Putbacks	Nominated
Hiatus Kaiyote	Nominated
Ngaiire	Nominated

=== Australian Video of the Year ===
This award celebrates creativity, originality and technical excellence in music videos.

List of Australian Video of the Year nominees
Director	Artist and Song	Result
Riley Blakeway	Genesis Owusu – "The Other Black Dog"	Won
Sanjay De Silva	Jerome Farah – "Concrete Jungle Fever"	Nominated
King Stingray and Sam Brumby	King Stingray – "Milkumana"	Nominated
Serwah Attafuah	Triple One – "Blood Rave"	Nominated
Ziggy Ramo	Ziggy Ramo featuring Paul Kelly – "Little Things"	Nominated

=== Unearthed Artist of the Year ===
Five artists that have risen through the ranks of Unearthed and are set for massive things in 2022.

List of Unearthed Artist of the Year nominees
Artist	Result
1300	Nominated
Blanke	Nominated
Hope D	Nominated
King Stingray	Won
Teenage Joans	Nominated

=== You Done Good Award ===
The You Done Good Award recognises an individual, group or business in the Australian music scene who has gone above-and-beyond and done something real good this year.

List of You Done Good nominees
Artist	Notes	Result
Concrete Surfers	For booking gigs at local footy games to prove a point.	Nominated
Digi Youth Arts	For launching the inaugural BLAKSOUND music conference	Nominated
Jack River	For sparking the Our Soundtrack Our Stories movement	Nominated
Jaguar Jonze	For advocating for systemic change and the support of abuse victims in the Australian music industry	Won
Support Act	For mental health services and COVID relief for the Australian music industry	Nominated
