= Small Achievements =

Studio album by Ruby Fields
- Released: 24 April 2026
- Studio: Major Label; No Waves
- Length: 38:09
- Label: Ruby Fields
- Producer: Chris Collins

Ruby Fields chronology
Live from Repentance Creek Hall (2022)	Small Achievements (2026)

Singles from Small Achievements
- 1. "92 Purebred" Released: 23 January 2025; 2. "Half the Laugh" Released: 9 April 2025; 3. "Tacklebox" Released: 24 May 2025; 4. "Muscle" Released: 3 March 2026; 5. "Mikey Echo" Released: 24 April 2026

Small Achievements is the second studio album by Australian singer-songwriter Ruby Fields. The album was announced in March 2026, alongside single "Muscle". The album was released on 24 April 2026.

In explaining the title, Fields told The Music she was inspired by one of the locals at a pub. Fields said "He got a trophy for playing golf and everyone treated it like it was the biggest celebration in the world, and for him it was. And that’s all that matters." She added, "To me, that small gesture represents a place that celebrates everyone's achievements, it doesn’t really matter how big or small they are, just how much they mean to you. So, I want this album to be a reminder to celebrate shit, because we tend to focus on the next big thing without reflecting on how much we've already achieved."

The album will be supported with an Australian tour in April and May 2026.

== Track listing ==
All lyrics are written by Ruby Phillips, except where noted; all music is composed by Phillips, Patrick Rogers, Tas Wilson, and Gauranga Wright, except where noted.

Small Achievements track listing
No.	Title	Lyrics	Music	Length
1.	"Dunny"		Ruby Phillips	2:37
2.	"92 Purebred"	Phillips; Patrick Cornwall	Phillips; Cornwall	3:22
3.	"Half the Laugh"	Phillips; Adam Newling; Patrick Rogers; Tas Wilson	Phillips; Newling; Rogers; Wilson	2:18
4.	"Tacklebox"			3:12
5.	"Mikey Echo"			3:08
6.	"Mosquitos"			4:16
7.	"Stay"			3:51
8.	"The Floods"			3:03
9.	"The Gums"			3:07
10.	"Firepile"			2:39
11.	"Muscle"			3:48
12.	"I Miss You" (featuring Toby Cregan)	Phillips; Toby Cregan	Phillips; Cregan	2:48
Total length:				38:09

== Personnel ==
Credits are adapted from the album's liner notes and Tidal.

- Ruby Phillips – vocals and guitar
- Chris Collins – production, engineering, mixing
- George Georgiadis – mastering
- Tas Wilson – bass
- Patrick Rogers – drums
- Gauranga Wright – guitar
- Alex Cameron – co-production, guitar (2)
- James Boundy – engineering (8)
- Toby Cregan – vocals (12)
- Connor Dewhurst – album and vinyl design
- Jill Bontempo – photography

== Charts ==
Chart performance for Small Achievements
Chart (2026)	Peak position
Australian Albums (ARIA)	29
