= Been Doin' It for a Bit =

Studio album by Ruby Fields
- Released: 24 September 2021
- Recorded: 2020
- Studio: Waiuku, New Zealand; The Music Farm, Byron Bay, Australia
- Genre: Alternative; pop punk
- Length: 33:27
- Label: Ruby Fields; Space 44; Flightless
- Producer: Chris Collins; Tim Fitz

Ruby Fields chronology
Permanent Hermit (2019)	Been Doin' It for a Bit (2021)	Small Achievements (2026)

Singles from Been Doin' It for a Bit
- 1. "Pretty Grim" Released: 25 September 2020; 2. "R.E.G.O." Released: 6 April 2021; 3. "Song About a Boy" Released: July 2021; 4. "Bottle-O" Released: 21 September 2021

Been Doin' It for a Bit is the debut studio album by Australian singer-songwriter Ruby Fields, released through Space 44 Records and Flightless on 24 September 2021. The album debuted at number 1 on the ARIA Albums Chart. At the J Awards of 2021, the album was nominated for Australian Album of the Year.

== Background and recording ==
Fields recorded the album in Waiuku, New Zealand in early 2020, but the sessions were cut short when the COVID-19 pandemic hit. They ultimately regrouped to complete the record at The Music Farm, Byron Bay later in the year. The Australian Independent Record Labels Association said "The finished product is a declaration of individual and artistic independence that reflects the complexities of growing up, making mistakes, and ultimately making peace with one's fallibility."

== Critical reception ==
Professional ratings
Review scores
Source	Rating
The AU Review	4/5 stars
Clash	8/10
NME Australia	4/5 stars

Matt Doria from NME Australia called the album a "gut-punching debut from an indie-rocker wiser than her years."

Dylan Marshall from The AU Review named it "A genuinely fun and charismatically easy listen" and "the edge of summer album you've been looking forward to after a long and bleak winter".

Shannon Garner from Clash felt that "the album is everything that Fields has built her name on – a modern, no-bullshit personality, and is an honest celebration of where she is at in life."

Al Newstead from ABC said "Each song on Been Doin' It for a Bit is packed with detail and memorable lines that convey so much more than their seemingly banal settings initially appear. From kitchens to pubs, backyards to bottle-os, Ruby is capable of being hilarious and heartfelt all at once, having you crying into a frothie as much as laughing over one."

In a review for Blunt Magazine, Mary Varvaris wrote that the album was "even greater than expected", stating that Fields created an album packed with "punchy, energetic, honest pop-punk anthems" with an "Aussie spin".

== Track listing ==
Track listing for Been Doin' It for a Bit
No.	Title	Writer(s)	Length
1.	"Song About a Boy"	Ruby Fields, Tim Fitz	3:49
2.	"R.E.G.O."	Fields, Chris Collins	2:59
3.	"Kitchen"	Fields	4:53
4.	"Bruises"	Fields	2:57
5.	"Airport Cafe"	Fields, Fitz	2:59
6.	"Pokies" (featuring Adam Newling)	Fields	3:09
7.	"Pretty Grim"	Fields, Fitz	2:49
8.	"Ouch"	Fields	1:46
9.	"Worms"	Fields	2:12
10.	"Clothes Line"	Fields	3:22
11.	"Bottle-O"	Fields	2:32
Total length:			33:27

== Charts ==
Chart performance for Been Doin' It for a Bit
Chart (2021)	Peak position
Australian Albums (ARIA)	1

== Release history ==
Release history and formats for Been Doin' It for a Bit
Region	Date	Format	Edition(s)	Label	Catalogue	Reference
Various	24 September 2021	digital download; streaming	Standard	Ruby Fields		
Australia	24 September 2021	CD	Standard	Space 44; Flightless	S44CD0009	
Australia	24 September 2021	LP	Super blue vinyl	Space 44; Flightless	S44LP0009	
Australia	24 September 2021	Cassette		Space 44; Flightless	FLTD-002	

== See also ==
- List of number-one albums of 2021 (Australia)
