= Cat Hope =

Australian musician and academic (born 1966)

Professor Cat Hope
- Born: Catherine Anne Hope; 11 March 1966 (age 60); Altona, Victoria, Australia
- Origin: Perth, Western Australia, Australia
- Genres: Experimental; noise
- Occupations: Musician; academic
- Instruments: Vocals; bass guitar; flute
- Years active: 1989–present
- Label: Bloodstar
- Website: www.cathope.com

Catherine Anne "Cat" Hope (born 11 March 1966), is an Australian composer, musician and academic. She started her music and academic careers in Perth and relocated to Melbourne in 2017. Her opera, Speechless, was first performed in 2019 at the Perth Festival. At the Art Music Awards of 2020 she won Work of the Year: Dramatic for Speechless. Steve Dow of The Age described the opera, "fuelled by outrage over the imprisonment of asylum seeker children, which features growling and screaming to an unconventional score without musical notation." Hope has also won the Art Music Award for Excellence in Experimental Music in 2011 for Decibel's 2009–2010 Annual Programs and in 2014 for her Drawn from Sound exhibition.

== Biography ==
Catherine Anne Hope was born in 1966. Her father was an RAAF officer and her mother was a nurse; from 9 to 12 years-old she had guitar lessons while her father was based in Penang, Malaysia; upon her reaching secondary school age the family relocated to Perth. She continued with guitar in secondary school and added flute and bass guitar in her final years at Rossmoyne Senior High School. She started at the University of Western Australia in 1984 to complete a Bachelor of Music (Honours) at its Conservatorium of Music in 1989. While a university student she also had to teach herself to play piano to keep up with her studies. One of her teachers, in composition, was English-born Perth-resident Roger Smalley. She was a member of the ALEA Ensemble (named for their aleatoric composition style), in 1989.

In 1988 in Italy, Hope founded the folk-rock indie trio, Micevice, with Hope on bass guitar, Marta Collica on lead vocals and Giovanni Ferrario on guitar. They recorded an album, Experiments on the Duration of Love (1999), in Melbourne and Catania with Hugo Race co-producing with Ferrario. It was re-release nearly ten years later (November 2008) via My Honey Records. Luigi Gaudio of OndaRock rated it at 7.5 and explained, "The eleven tracks are rare pearls, a cloud of warm smoke that envelops anyone who abandons themselves." After Hope left, Micevice had released two further albums, Bipolars of the World Unite (2000) and Stop Here: Love Store (2002).

Gata Negra (Spanish: Black Cat) was formed early in 1999 in Perth by Hope on bass guitar, vocals, samples and toys, Myles Durham on drums and Ant Gray on guitar. Their debut album, Cage of Stars, appeared later that year. It was recorded at North Perth Town Hall, where they were joined by Ferarrio on guitars, Guy Fleming on sounds, Jazmine on piano, Boogie Man Krak on turntables, Viv Langham on cello, Sophie Moleta on vocals and glockenspiel, Lindsay Vickery on vocals and Kim Williams on vocals. The group issued two more albums, Saint Dymphanae (2002) and Ruby (2007). Later members included Kristian Brenchley on guitar, Tim Evans on drums (both c. 2000), Bill Darby on guitar, Pete Guazzelli on drums (both c. 2006).

In 2009, Hope formed Decibel New Music Ensemble (also known as Decibel), with Hope as music director and flautist. Other members have included Vickery on reeds and electronics, Louise Devenish on percussion, Stuart James on piano, percussion, electronics and spatialisation, Tristen Parr on cello, Adam Pinto on piano, Chris Tonkin on electronics and Aaron Wyatt on violin and viola. At the APRA Music Awards' Art Music Awards of 2011 she won the Award for Excellence in Experimental Music for Decibel's 2009–2010 Annual Programs. To celebrate their 10th anniversary, in May 2019, the ensemble performed 10 from 10, which was broadcast nationally on ABC Classic radio's programme, Evenings. It had been recorded live in concert at the Primrose Potter Salon with Duncan Yardley as producer.

Hope performs and records solo noise music using bass guitar. She was also a co-founder of the Perth noise duo Lux Mammoth (1999–2005) with Alien Smith (both on bass guitar and electronics); and founder and bassist in Abe Sada (2004–2014). She is the founder of the Low Tone Orchestra (2020-), The Australian Bass Orchestra (2014-) and is a performer in noise duos Super Luminum (with guitarist Lisa MacKinney, 2015-), HzHzHz (with cellist Tristen Parr, 2016-) and Candied Limbs (with clarinettist Vickery, 2012-). As a flute player, she has worked with French composers Eliane Radigue and Lionel Marchetti. Her solo bass noise piece for dance artist Rakini Devi appeared on the various artists' compilation album, Extreme Music from Women, issued by the Susan Lawly label in 2000. Since then she has released a wide range of music compositions and performances on music labels around the world, most recently on the Swiss label Hat Hut.

Rosalind Appleby, a music journalist, in her book, Women of Note: the Rise of Australian Women Composers (2012), addressed the work of Hope in the chapter, "Third wave 1980-2010: Cathie Travers and Cat Hope". In honour of Roger Smalley, who died in August 2015, Hope directed Decibel, to reinvigorate his works, which had been "performed in the pioneering electro-acoustic ensemble Intermodulation", for a concert in June 2016. The West Australian's Appleby observed, "[they] brought the little-known repertoire back to life. Their concert... paid fascinating homage to Smalley."

Hope delivered the Peggy Glanville-Hicks Address in November 2018, "All Music for Everyone: Working Towards Gender Equality and Empowerment in Australian Music Culture", in Adelaide, Melbourne and Perth. It was followed by the premiere of her work, Silenced, co-composed with Dobromila Jaskot.

Her opera, Speechless, was first performed in February 2019 at the Perth Festival. Hope wrote it as a response to The Forgotten Children: National Inquiry into Children in Immigration Detention presented by the 2014 Human Rights Commission. Australian Arts Review' writer described it as, "a compelling, courageous and visceral sonic world paying homage to people whose voices are rendered silent through political means." It was performed by the soloists Judith Dodsworth (soprano), Karina Utomo (metal singer of Young and Restless, High Tension), Caitlin Cassidy (improvising mezzo-soprano), Sage Pbbbt (non-binary throat singer) with backing by Australian Bass Orchestra, Decibel New Music Ensemble, and Aaron Wyatt as conductor. In March of the following year it was broadcast, in two parts, on ABC Classic's New Wave. At the Art Music Awards of 2020 Hope, and the performers, won Work of the Year: Dramatic for Speechless.

=== Academic career ===
Hope is a music academic, with research areas in animated notation, gender and music, digital archives, Australian music and artistic research in composition and performance. She lectured in classical music and music technology at the Western Australian Academy of Performing Arts at Edith Cowan University between 2004 and 2010, and was the Inaugural Associate Dean (Research) there in 2016 after Postdoctoral Fellowship. Hope holds a PhD in art from RMIT University, her thesis, "The Possibility of Infrasonic Music", was delivered in 2010. She was the Professor of Music at Sir Zelman Cowen School of Music at Monash University, where she was head of school from 2017 to 2020.

== Awards and fellowship ==
Her first portrait CD, Ephemeral Rivers, was released in 2017 on the Hat [Art] Hut label, and won the Deutscher Kritikerpreis that same year. Hope has also received a Churchill Fellowship, a Civitella Ranieri Fellowship, an AsiaLink residency (Singapore, Theatreworks) and the Peggy Glanville-Hicks House Residency in Paddington (2014).

=== APRA Music Awards ===
APRA AMCOS (Australasian Performing Right Association, Australasian Mechanical Copyright Owners Society) and Australian Music Centre (AMC) have co-sponsored the annual APRA Music Awards: Art Music Awards (originally Classical Music Awards) since 2002. Previously AMC had provided their own annual classical music awards from 1988. Hope has been awarded three Art Music Awards, the Award for Excellence in Experimental Music in 2011 and in 2014 and Work of the Year: Dramatic for her first opera, Speechless in 2020.

Year	Nominee / work	Award	Result	Ref.
2011	Contribution to Music Education in Western Australia	Award for Excellence in Music Education	Nominated	
2011	Decibel's 2009–2010 Annual Programs	Award for Excellence in Experimental Music	Won	
2013	Supporting and growing new music in Western Australia	Award for Excellence by an Individual	Nominated	
2014	Drawn from Sound exhibition	Award for Excellence in Experimental Music	Won	
2017	Performance, academia, composition, mentoring and advocacy	Award for Excellence by an Individual	Nominated	
2019	Leadership in the composition, performance and education of new music in Australia	Award for Excellence by an Individual	Nominated	
2020	Speechless (Cat Hope) by Judith Dodsworth, Karina Utomo, Caitlin Cassidy, Sage Pbbbt (soloists); with Australian Bass Orchestra, Decibel New Music Ensemble, and Aaron Wyatt (conductor)	Work of the Year: Dramatic (Note: Work of the Year: Dramatic was awarded to both Cat Hope for Speechless and to Elliott Gyger / Pierce Wilcox for Oscar and Lucinda.)	Won	

=== Music Victoria Awards ===
The Music Victoria Awards are an annual awards night celebrating Victorian music. They commenced in 2006.

Year	Nominee / work	Award	Result	Ref.
2019	Cat Hope	Best Experimental/Avant-Garde Act	Nominated	
2022	Cat Hope	Best Experimental/Avant-Garde Work	Nominated	

== Discography ==
solo

- Fetish, CD (Sound Gallery Label, 2000; Bloodstar, 2001)
- Justine 8" (Bloodstar, 2001)
- Regret CD (Gods of the Tundra, USA, 2001)
- Yume MC (One Touch Monopolka, USSR, 2001)
- Jackie Hush CD (Bloodstar, 2002)
- Platinum Fox, on Luminosity: Musical Treasures from UWA. University of Western Australia. CD. (2013)
- Ephemeral Rivers. hat[now]ART 200: Switzerland. CD (2017)
- The Sinister Glamour of Modernity, on Australia: East and West, CD, Wirripang, (2020)

with Abe Sada

- Subzilla, Bloodstar, CD (2007)
- Tatare Steppe, VLZ Produkt, CD (2008)
- Redux, Heartless Robot LP (2009)
- The Low Chord, Kabutsuri Tape International, CD (2009)

with Gata Negra

- Ruby, Bloodstar (Aus), LP (2007)

with Lux Mammoth

- New Gauge Sinner, Pre Feed label (Italy), CD (2007)

with Decibel

- In the Cut, Kuklinski's Dream on Disintegration: Mutation. HellosQare Records, CD (2010)
- Longing on Stasis Ecstatic. Heartless Robot Productions, LP (2014)
- The Lowest Drawer on Tuned Darker, LP, Listen|Hear: Perth LP (2015)
- The Earth Defeats Me and Last Days of Reality on Last Days of Reality, CD Room 40, RM4102 (2018)

with Candied Limbs

- Sub Project 54 Tura Records, CD (2013)

with Louise Devenish

- Tone Being on Music for Percussion and Electronics, CD, Tall Poppies TP428 (2017)

with Monash Art Ensemble

- Dark Hip Falls on Hear, Now, Here CD FMR (2019)

Gabriella Smart

- Kaps Freed on Works for Travelling Pianos, CD, ezz-thetics 1012 (2020)

== Bibliography ==
=== As a primary author ===
- Hope, Cat; Ryan, John Charles (2014-06-19). Digital Arts: An Introduction to New Media. Bloomsbury Publishing USA. ISBN 978-1-78093-321-4.

=== As a contributor ===
- Burke, Robert; Onsman, Andrys (2017-01-23). Perspectives on Artistic Research in Music. Lexington Books. ISBN 978-1-4985-4482-5.
- Sant, Toni (2017-03-23). Documenting Performance: The Context and Processes of Digital Curation and Archiving. Bloomsbury Publishing. ISBN 978-1-4725-8819-7.
- Fabian, Dorottya; Napier, John (2018-10-30). Diversity in Australia's Music: Themes Past, Present, and for the Future. Cambridge Scholars Publishing. ISBN 978-1-5275-2066-0.

=== Academic papers ===
Hope has also authored over 70 academic papers according to Google Scholar.
