= Jerome Farah =

Australian singer, rapper and songwriter

- Also known as: ROMME
- Born
- Occupations: Singer; songwriter; musician
- Years active: 2018–present
- Labels: Jerome Farah, Sony Music Australia 7CULT
- Website: https://www.jeromefarah.com

Jerome Farah, is an Australian singer, songwriter and producer. Farah co-wrote and co-produced "Waiting" with Kian before releasing his debut single in 2020.

== Early life ==
Jerome Farah is the son of a Lebanese father and a Zimbabwean mother and grew up in suburban Melbourne.

Originally a dancer, Farah transited into music, collaborating with the likes of Adrian Eagle, Baker Boy and Dallas Woods and Kian.

== Music career ==
=== 2018-present ===
In 2018, Farah co-wrote and co-produced "Waiting" with Kian which won Most Performed Australian Work of the Year and Most Performed Alternative Work of the Year at the APRA Music Awards of 2020.

On 26 June 2020, Farah released his debut single "I Can't Breathe". The song discusses racism and police brutality. On 19 July 2020, Farah performed the song on the series premiere of Australian live music program The Sound.

In September 2024, Farah released his debut EP Chlorine.

== Discography ==
=== Extended plays ===
List of EPs, with selected details
Title	Details
Chlorine	Released: 27 September 2024; Label: Jerome Farah, Sony Music Australia

=== Singles ===
==== As lead artist ====
List of singles, with year released and album name shown
Title	Year	Album
"I Can't Breathe"	2020	Non-album singles
"Mikey Might"	2020	Non-album singles
"Vibrate"	2020	Non-album singles
"Concrete Jungle Fever"	2021	Non-album singles
"Can't Drive Stick"	2024	Chlorine
"R.I.P."	2024	Chlorine
"Good Girl"	2024	Chlorine
"Chlorine"	2024	Chlorine

==== As featured artist ====
List of singles, with year released and album name shown
Title	Year	Album
"Hoodlum" (Dallas Woods featuring Jerome Farah)	2018	non album single
"Willow Tree" (Tash Sultana featuring Jerome Farah)	2020	Terra Firma (Tash Sultana album)
"Tuesday" (Kye featuring Jerome Farah)	2021	TBA
"Of Another Kind" (Winston Surfshirtfeaturing Milan Ring & Jerome Farah)	2022	Panna Cotta

=== Guest appearances ===
List of guest appearances, with year released and album name shown
Title	Year	Album
"Not That Deep" (DAGR featuring Jerome Farah)	2021	DAGR
"Ain't Nobody Like You" (Baker Boy featuring Jerome Farah)	2021	Gela

== Awards and nominations ==
=== ARIA Music Awards ===
The ARIA Music Awards is an annual awards ceremony that recognises excellence, innovation, and achievement across all genres of Australian music. They commenced in 1987.

Year	Nominee / work	Award	Result	Ref.
2022	Pip Norman, Rob Amoruso, Morgan Jones, Carl Dimataga, Willie Tafa & Jerome Farah for Baker Boy – Gela	Best Produced Album	Nominated	
2025	Chlorine	Best Soul/R&B Release	Nominated	

=== APRA Awards ===
The APRA Awards are held in Australia and New Zealand by the Australasian Performing Right Association to recognise songwriting skills, sales and airplay performance by its members annually.

Year	Nominee / work	Award	Result	Ref.
2019	"Marryuna" by Baker Boy (with Danzal Baker, Dion Brownfield & Yirrmal Marika)	Song of the Year	Shortlisted	
2019	"Marryuna" by Baker Boy (with Danzal Baker, Dion Brownfield & Yirrmal Marika)	Urban Work of the Year	Nominated	
2019	"Mr La Di Da Di" by Baker Boy (Danzal Baker, Dion Brownfield & Dallas Woods)	Urban Work of the Year	Nominated	
2020	"Waiting" (with Kian)	Most Performed Australian Work of the Year	Won	
2020	"Waiting" (with Kian)	Most Performed Alternative Work of the Year	Won	
2020	"Cool as Hell" (Danzal Baker, Carl Dimataga, Jesse Ferris, Morgan Jones, Brendan Tuckerman, Dallas Woods)	Most Performed Urban Work of the Year	Nominated	
2021	"Meditjin" (Danzal Baker, Jess Bourke, Dion Brownfield, Jerome Farah, Dallas Woods)	Song of the Year	Shortlisted	
2022	"Vibrate"	Most Performed R&B / Soul Work	Nominated	
2023	"Tuesday" (KYE featuring Jerome Farah) (Kylie Chirunga, Jerome Farah, Jacob Farah, Vincent Goodyer)	Most Performed R&B / Soul Work	Nominated	
2024	"Falling" by Dean Brady (Dean Brady, Jacob Farah, Jerome Farah, Kara-Lee James, Tim Omaji, Rahel Phillips)	Most Performed R&B / Soul Work	Nominated	

=== J Awards ===
The J Awards are an annual series of Australian music awards that were established by the Australian Broadcasting Corporation's youth-focused radio station Triple J. They commenced in 2005.

Year	Nominee / work	Award	Result	Ref.
J Awards of 2021	"Concrete Jungle Fever" (directed by Sanjay De Silva)	Australian Video of the Year	Nominated	

=== Rolling Stone Australia Awards ===
The Rolling Stone Australia Awards are awarded annually in January or February by the Australian edition of Rolling Stone magazine for outstanding contributions to popular culture in the previous year.

Year	Nominee / work	Award	Result	Ref.
2021	Jerome Farah	Best New Artist	Nominated	

=== Vanda & Young Global Songwriting Competition ===
The Vanda & Young Global Songwriting Competition is an annual competition that "acknowledges great songwriting whilst supporting and raising money for Nordoff-Robbins" and is coordinated by Albert Music and APRA AMCOS. It commenced in 2009.

Year	Nominee / work	Award	Result	Ref.
2021	"Mikey Might"	Vanda & Young Global Songwriting Competition	2nd	

=== UK Music Video Awards ===
The UK Music Video Awards is an annual celebration of creativity, technical excellence and innovation in music video and moving image for music. They commenced in 2008.

Year	Nominee / work	Award	Result	Ref.
2021	Jerome Farah - "Concrete Jungle Fever"	Best Performance in a Video	Nominated	
