= Dinosaurs (song) =

2018 song by Australian musician Ruby Fields

Single by Ruby Fields

from the album Permanent Hermit
- Released: 18 September 2018
- Length: 3:53
- Label: Ruby Fields

Ruby Fields singles chronology
"Ritalin" (2018)	"Dinosaurs" (2018)	"The Unguarded Moment (Triple J Like a Version)" (2019)

Music video
- "Dinosaurs" on YouTube

"Dinosaurs" is a song by Australian singer-songwriter, Ruby Fields. It was released in September 2018 as the lead single from Field's second extended play Permanent Hermit. It was certified gold in Australia in 2020.

At the APRA Music Awards of 2020, the song was nominated for Most Performed Rock Work of the Year.

== Reception ==
Sose Fuamoli from Triple J said "Heart on sleeve, weaving depth in through a simple arrangement that lands with one helluva emotional punch, Ruby has continued to operate in an indie rock space listeners of her music will be familiar but when that explosion of sound hits at the 03:04 mark, she truly shines under the spotlight."

Simon Clark from the AU Review call the song "stunning" saying "[it's] really beautiful stuff – understated initially, with a focus on Fields' vocals and lyrics, before a cathartic explosion of sound in the closing minute. There's a tinge of melancholy to the record, but it's never dour or overbearing, instead there is an emotional vulnerability to Fields' delivery that is endearing and reflects an ever increasing maturity to her songwriting."

== Certifications ==
Region	Certification	Certified units/sales
Australia (ARIA)	Platinum	70,000^{‡}
^{‡} Sales+streaming figures based on certification alone.
