= Extreme music =

Extreme music may refer to any of the following styles of music:

- Rock music genres characterised by harsh sounds or themes
  - Heavy metal music
    - Extreme metal, an umbrella term for harsher heavy metal subgenres
  - Punk rock
    - Hardcore punk, and other punk genres characterized by speed and aggression
- Experimental music and avant-garde music, which radically challenge existing musical conventions
  - Noise music, which blends musical and non-musical sound
  - Danger music, which might harm the listener or the performer

== Other uses ==
- Extreme Music, a music production company
- Extreme Records, a record label
- Extreme Music from Women, a compilation album
- ECW: Extreme Music, a compilation album related to Extreme Championship Wrestling
- Extreme (band), an American rock band
  - Extreme (Extreme album), 1989

== See also ==
- List of rock genres
  - Heavy metal genres
