= Extreme Music from Women =

Extreme Music From Women

Compilation album by Various Artists
- Released: 2000
- Genre: Various
- Label: Susan Lawly

Extreme Music From Women is a compilation album released in 2000 on the Susan Lawly label.

== Track listing ==
1. Rosemary Malign - "No You Listen"
2. Lisa & Naomi Tocatly - "Stiletto Nights""
3. Delores Dewberry - "Paragraph 64"
4. Candi Nook - "Schizephrenisis II"
5. Annabel Lee - "Lycanthropy"
6. Mira Calix - "Too Slim For Suicide"
7. Clara Clamp - "September"
8. Debra Petrovich - "Dislocated"
9. Karen Thomas - "Puritan"
10. Betty Cannery - "Closeted"
11. Gaya Donadio - "Indiscretion"
12. Maria Moran - "Tattoo"
13. Frl. Tost - "I Hate You, Laura"
14. Wendy Van Dusen - "Dog"
15. Cat Hope - "Mindimi Trek"
16. Diane Nelson - "Mounted Insect - Dissected Insect"
