= Aodhan (singer) =

Indie artist from Wollongong, Australia

- Born: Aidan Whitehall; 2004 (age 21–22); Wollongong, New South Wales, Australia
- Genres: Alternative rock; Indie folk
- Years active: 2018–present
- Labels: Communion; Orthrus
- Website: aodhanmusic.com

Aidan Whitehall (born 2004), known by his stage name Aodhan, is an Australian alternative rock singer-songwriter. He signed to the label Communion in 2020 and has since released two EPs, Flies In My Room (2021) and Dwelling (2023).

== Early life ==
Aidan Whitehall was born in 2004 and grew up in Wollongong, New South Wales. He began playing electronic music when he was twelve years old, and subsequently began learning guitar. When he was thirteen, he began writing music, and performed live for the first time.

== Career ==
=== Early releases ===
In 2019, Whitehall uploaded his debut single, "Love is Hard to Write About", to SoundCloud. The same year, Whitehall took out the Triple J Unearthed High Indigenous Initiative, winning the opportunity to partner with APRA songwriters including Josh Pyke. The song he produced with Pyke, "Drive", ranked 13th on the AU Review's 'Top 40 Best Australian Tracks of 2020' list.

In June 2020, Aodhan signed with United Kingdom-based publishing group Communion.

=== Flies In My Room ===
In October 2020, Aodhan released "Twelve Again", the first of three singles supporting his debut extended play (EP), Flies In My Room. "I'm Closed" and "Daily Meditation" followed in February and May 2021 respectively. The EP was produced by Whitehall and Ryan Miller, and released in July 2021. Online music publication Backseat Mafia described the project as "gentle" with "crisp acoustic guitars and a bed of billowing synths and harmonies".

On 9 December 2021, Aodhan performed live on Triple J's Like a Version, where he covered "Just What I Needed" by the Cars and performed a live version of "Twelve Again". In April 2022, Whitehall embarked on a nationwide tour, including international dates in the United Kingdom, to support the EP. He also performed at Groovin' the Moo as part of the Fresh Produce roster. Whitehall was also announced as a recipient of a grant from Barpirdhila, an organisation that provides funds to First Nations artists impacted by the COVID-19 pandemic. In September 2022, Aodhan performed at music festival Bigsound.

Aodhan performs live with Floodway, a garage rock band also based in Wollongong.

== Discography ==
=== Extended plays ===
- Flies In My Room (Communion, 16 July 2021)
- Dwelling (Orthrus, 26 May 2023)

=== Singles ===
- "Love Is Hard to Write About" (2019)
- "When Your Eyes Speak" (2019)
- "Butterflies" (2019)
- "Fortune Cookie" (2019)
- "Drive" (2020)
- "Three Leaf Clover" (2021) – cover of Teenage Joans
- "Just What I Needed" (2021) – cover of the Cars for Like a Version
