= Cloud 9 (Baker Boy song) =

Single by Baker Boy featuring Kian
- Released: 27 April 2017
- Length: 3:14
- Label: Baker Boy (independent)
- Songwriters: Danzal Baker; Dion Brownfield; Kian Brownfield; Tobiahs Fakhri
- Producer: Tobias Fakhri

Baker Boy singles chronology
"Cloud 9" (2017)	"Marryuna" (2017)

Music video
- "Cloud 9" on YouTube

"Cloud 9" is the debut single by Indigenous Australian rapper Baker Boy, featuring Australian musician Kian, released independently on 27 April 2017.. It is credited as the first original rap to be recorded and released in Yolŋu Matha language.

Following its release, Triple J named Baker Boy their Indigenous Unearthed winner, earning him a spot to perform at the 2017 National Indigenous Music Awards.

== Critical reception ==
Sosefina Fuamoli from The AU Review said "Encompassing a vibrant blend of hip hop and fun lyricism, 'Cloud 9' is a perfect example of the fresh young talent thriving up North." Fuamoli continued saying "'Cloud 9' is Baker Boy's passionate introduction of a tune, while Kian's vocals in the chorus adds extra flair. Rapping in both English and Yolŋu Matha, Baker Boy is a breath of fresh air."

Indigenous Community TV called the song "an example of the real Aussie Hip-hop". Andrea Gavrilovic from MTV Australia called the song "equal parts catchy and ground breaking." The Music called the song "an absolute banger".
