= Becca Hatch =

Australian musician

- Born: Rebecca Hatch; 2001; Campbelltown, New South Wales, Australia
- Occupations: Singer, Songwriter
- Label: Sony Music Australia

Rebecca "Becca" Hatch (born 2001) is an Australian musician and singer-songwriter from Sydney, Australia. She signed to "Forever Ever Records", a joint venture label between Australian hip hop host Hau Latukefu and Sony Music Australia, in February 2021.

Hatch was the winner of Triple J’s Unearthed High Indigenous Initiative in 2017. Since then she released a multitude of singles, "2560", "Girl Like Me", "Please U (feat. Planet Vegeta)", "B the One", "Safety", "Without You", "Blessed", "All of Me", and "Ride For Me".

In 2018, Hatch performed the Australian national anthem in both English and the Indigenous language, prior to the opening match of the NRL's Indigenous Round between the Wests Tigers and North Queensland Cowboys at Leichhardt Oval.

In 2020, She performed a cover version of John Farnham's "Burn for You" for Triple J's Like a Version.

Her song "Please U" (feat. Planet Vegeta) received full rotation on Triple J.

In March 2023, Hatch united with Kian on the single "All of Me". It was also announced that American video game company EA and video game developer Maxis partnered with Becca Hatch to debut a version of Hatch's single "Blessed" performed in Simlish. In June, she performed during the pre-match ceremony at the first game of the 2023 Women's State of Origin held at CommBank Stadium in Parramatta.

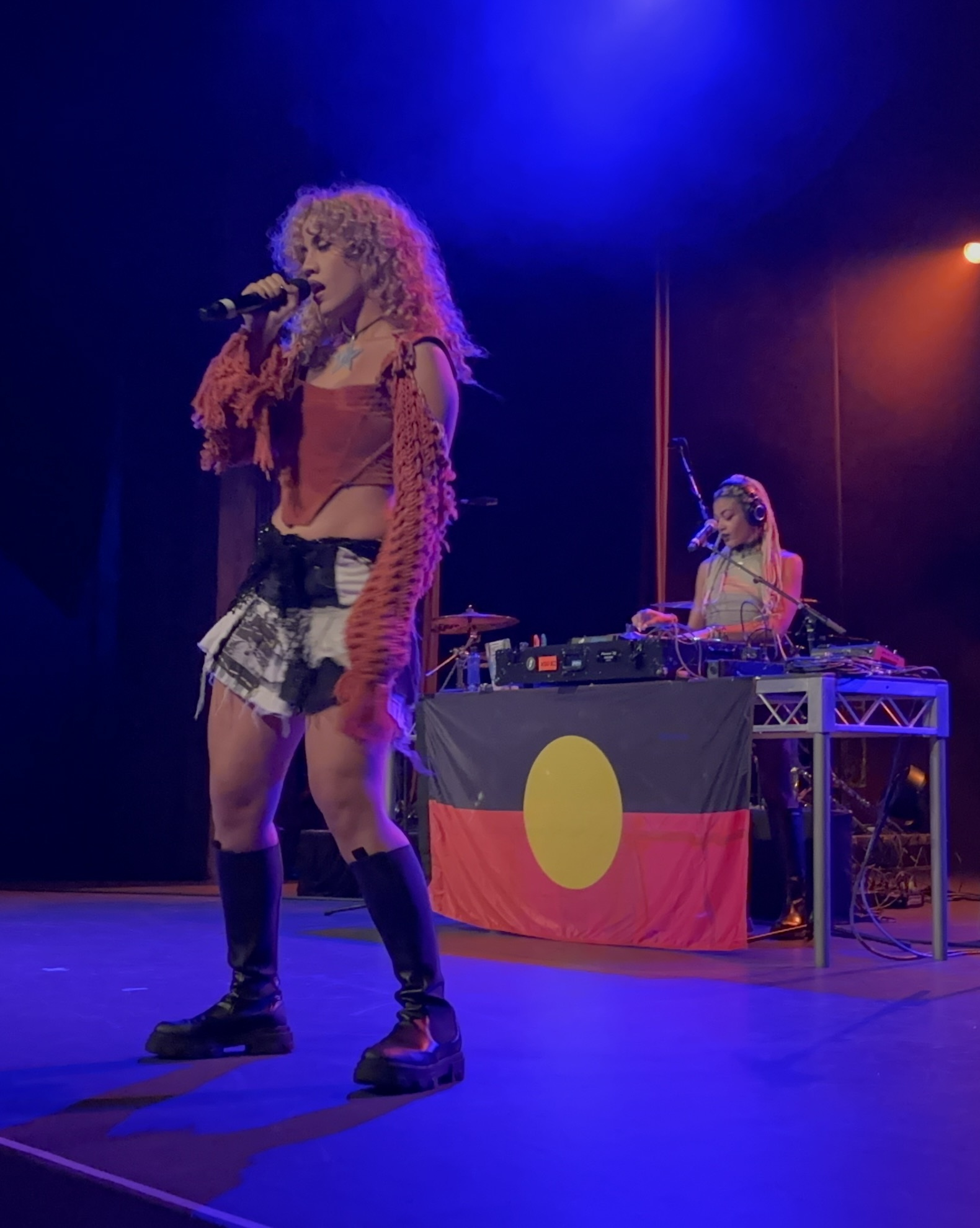
Hatch performing in Sydney in 2024

In April to May 2024, Hatch opened for British singer Mahalia on the Australian leg of her In Real Life tour.

In June 2024, Hatch announced the forthcoming release of her debut EP Mayday.

In November 2024, Hatch performed her own verse during Coldplay's performance of the song "We Pray" on two shows of the band's Music of the Spheres World Tour at Accor Stadium.

In January 2025, Hatch opened for American singer Tinashe on the Australian leg of her Match My Freak: World Tour.

Hatch completed a Bachelor of Music and Sound Design at the University of Technology Sydney, graduating in 2021.

== Discography ==
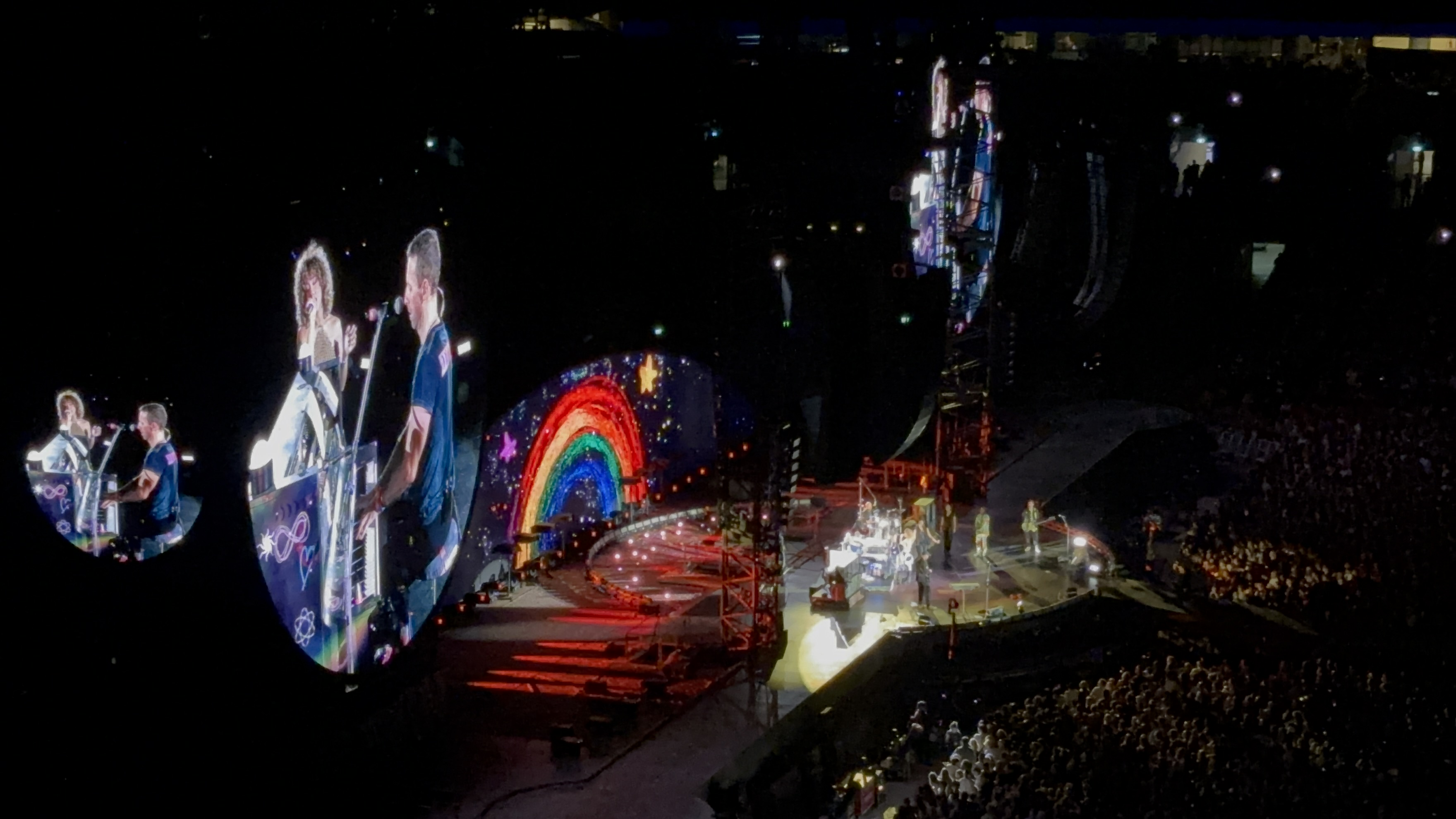
Hatch performing with Coldplay during the band's Music of the Spheres World Tour at Accor Stadium, Sydney on 6 November 2024.

=== Extended plays ===
List of extended plays
Title	EP details
Mayday	Released: 9 August 2024; Labels: Forever Ever, Sony Music Australia; Format: LP, digital download
Black Flower	Released: 3 February 2027; Labels: Becca Hatch, G.Y.R.O.; Format:

=== Singles ===
List of singles
Title	Year	Album / EP
"2560"	2020	Non-album singles
"Girl Like Me"	2020	Non-album singles
"Burn for You" (Triple J Like a Version)	2020	Like a Version: Volume Sixteen
"Please U" (featuring Planet Vegeta)	2021	Non-album singles
"B the One" (with B Wise)	2021	Non-album singles
"Safety"	2021	Non-album singles
"Without You"	2022	Non-album singles
"Blessed"	2022	Non-album singles
"All of Me" (with Kian)	2023	Non-album singles
"Ride for Me"	2023	Non-album singles
"Bass Keeps Calling"	2024	Mayday
"Think of You"	2024	Mayday
"Crash"	2024	Mayday
"Incapable"	2024	Mayday
"Garden [Bang Goes the Drum]"	2026	Black Flower
"Daylight Robbery"	2026	Black Flower
"Black Flower"	2026	Black Flower
"Extra Time"	2026	Black Flower

== Awards and nominations ==
=== APRA Awards ===
The APRA Awards are held in Australia and New Zealand by the Australasian Performing Right Association to recognise songwriting skills, sales and airplay performance by its members annually.

Year	Nominee / work	Award	Result	Ref.
2022	"2560" by Becca Hatch	Most Performed R&B / Soul Work	Nominated	
2022	"Please U" (featuring Planet Vegeta)	Most Performed R&B / Soul Work	Nominated	
2023	"Safety"	Most Performed R&B / Soul Work	Nominated	

=== ARIA Music Awards ===
The ARIA Music Awards is an annual award ceremony event celebrating the Australian music industry.

Year	Nominee / work	Award	Result	Ref.
2023	Sims Sessions; Blessed (Bolster Group)	Best Use of an Australian Recording in an Advertisement (over 2 minutes duration)	Nominated	
2024	Mayday	Michael Gudinski Breakthrough Artist	Nominated	
2026	"Garden (Bang Goes the Drum)"	Best Soul/R&B Release	Nominated	

=== National Indigenous Music Awards ===
The National Indigenous Music Awards is an annual awards ceremony that recognises the achievements of Indigenous Australians in music.

Year	Nominee / work	Award	Result	Ref.
2024	Becca Hatch	New Talent of the Year	Won	

=== Rolling Stone Australia Awards ===
The Rolling Stone Australia Awards are awarded annually in January or February by the Australian edition of Rolling Stone magazine for outstanding contributions to popular culture in the previous year.

Year	Nominee / work	Award	Result	Ref.
2025	Becca Hatch	Best New Artist	Shortlisted	
