= Kian (musician) =

Australian singer-songwriter

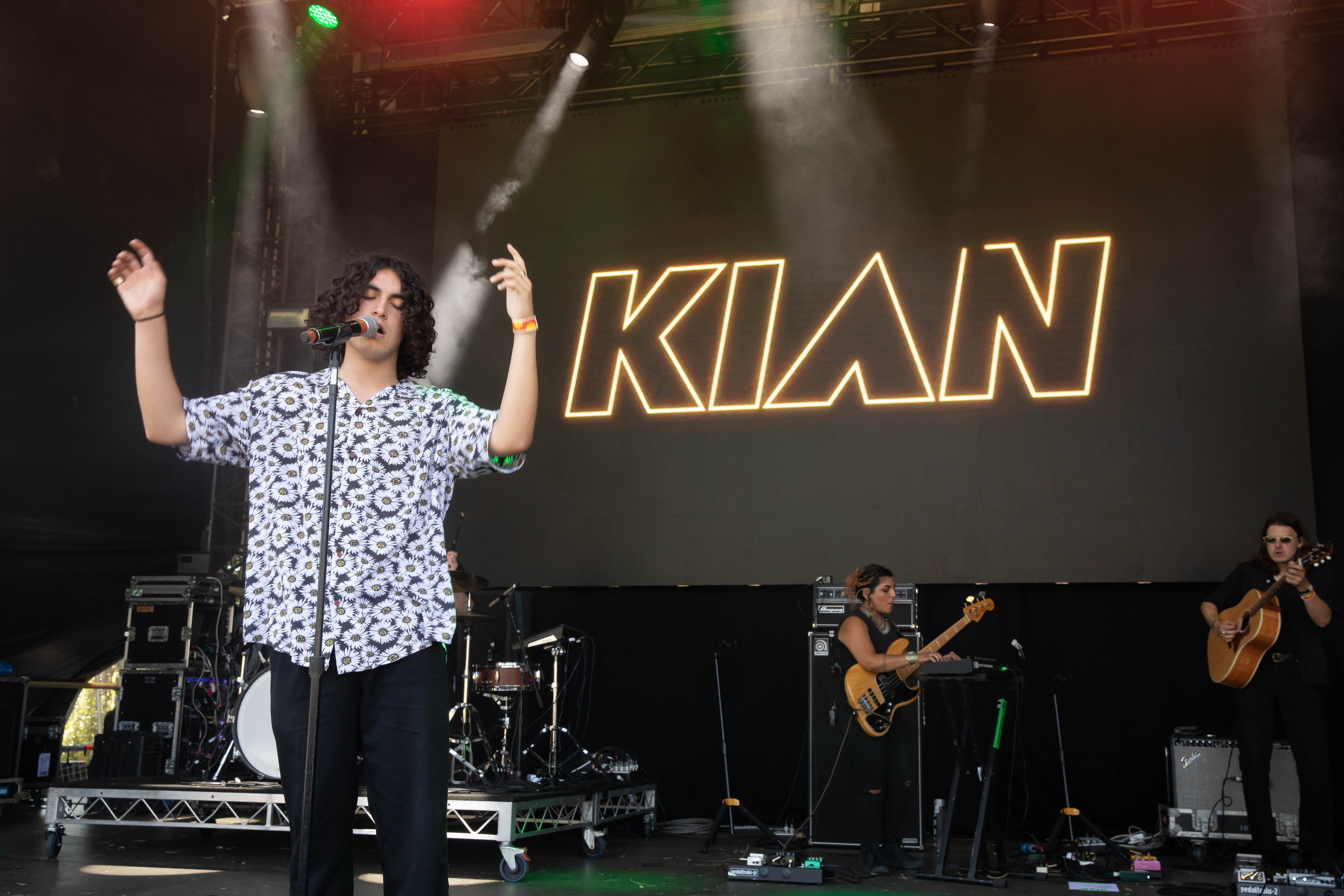
- Kian performing at Laneway Festival in 2019

Background information
- Born: Kian Maxwell Bytyci Brownfield; 14 July 2002 (age 24); Castlemaine, Victoria, Australia
- Origin: Castlemaine, Victoria, Australia
- Genres: Alternative pop; indie pop
- Occupations: Singer; songwriter
- Instruments: Vocals; guitar
- Years active: 2017–present
- Labels: EMI Australia; Republic
- Website: Official website

Kian Maxwell Bytyci Brownfield (born 14 July 2002), known professionally as Kian (stylised in all caps; pronounced "Key-ahn") is an Australian singer and songwriter from Castlemaine, Victoria. He is best known for winning Triple J Unearthed in August 2018. His breakthrough single "Waiting" was polled at number 20 on Triple J's Hottest 100 of 2018.

== Early life ==
Kian was born in July 2002 in the goldfield town of Castlemaine, Victoria, Australia. Since the age of three, Kian and his mother traveled on and off with his father making music in remote indigenous Australian communities. Kian's parents separated in 2010, although both parents are singer songwriters and passionate about music. hearing him sing at a very early age, Kian's mother and father saw his potential and he received his first guitar at the age of seven.

== Music career ==
=== 2017–2021: Early years and Bliss ===
In May 2017 Kian wrote and sang the chorus of Baker Boy's debut single "Cloud 9". The single's popularity kickstarted Kian's success.

In February 2018, Kian released "Too Far Gone" with 15-year-old Vince the Kid. In July, Kian released "Waiting" a song he wrote at the age of 14, with him explaining "It's about that feeling of uncertainty when you don't know if they like you back – I know it's childish but I reckon everyone has found themselves in this insecure hole at some point in their lives no matter what age. Hidden within the lyrics are some things that relate to me personally along with metaphorical things to move the story along." In August, Kian was announced the winner of the 2018 Triple J Unearthed. Since winning Triple J Unearthed, "Waiting" was added to high rotation and was being played on the more commercial radio station, Nova. In November, Kian signed a new recording deal with EMI Music in Australia and Republic Records for the rest of the world.

In February 2019, he released his third single "Childism" with Triple J getting an exclusive first listen. Kian explained that "It's about young people feeling like they don't have a place [in society] and we're stuck in the middle." The single was also written before "Waiting" was even thought of.

On 10 May 2019, Kian released his debut extended play Bliss. He also announced a tour for late-July into early-August. Following the release of Bliss, Kian released a series of stand-alone singles.

=== 2022-2023: Shine ===
In July 2022, Kian released "Shine", the title track and third single from his second extended play, released on 26 August 2022.

In March 2023, Kian united with Becca Hatch on the single "All of Me".

=== 2024: Wake Up, You're Falling ===
In February 2024, Kian released "Try Hard", the lead single from his debut studio album Wake Up, You're Falling.

== Discography ==
=== Albums ===
List of albums, with release date and label shown
Title	Album details
Wake Up, You're Falling	Released: 1 November 2024; Label: EMI Australia; Format: LP, digital

=== Extended plays ===
List of EPs, with release date and label shown
Title	EP details
Bliss	Released: 10 May 2019; Label: EMI Music Australia; Format: CD, digital download, streaming
Shine	Scheduled: 26 August 2022; Label: EMI Music Australia; Format: digital download, streaming

=== Singles ===
==== As lead artist ====
List of singles as lead artist, with year released, selected chart positions and certifications, and album name shown
Title	Year	Peak chart positions		Certifications	Album
Title	Year	AUS	NZ Hot	Certifications	Album
"Too Far Gone" (with Vince the Kid)	2018	—	—		Non-album single
"Waiting"	2018	15	—	ARIA: 2× Platinum	Bliss
"Childism"	2019	—	34		Bliss
"Every Hour"	2020	—	—		Non-album singles
"Sunbeam"	2020	—	—		Non-album singles
"Fit in Here"	2022	—	—		Shine
"Direction"	2022	—	—		Shine
"Shine"	2022	—	—		Shine
"Come Through" (featuring rako, goyo and DALI HART)	2022	—	—		Shine
"All of Me" (with Becca Hatch)	2023	—	—		TBA
"The Way"	2023	—	—		TBA
"Try Hard"	2024	—	—		Wake Up, You're Falling
"Regrets"	2024	—	—		Wake Up, You're Falling
"On the Line" (with Logan)	2024	—	—		Wake Up, You're Falling
"Ultraviolet"	2024	—	—		Wake Up, You're Falling
"My Release"	2024	—	—		Wake Up, You're Falling

==== As featured artist ====
Title	Year	Album
"Cloud 9" (Baker Boy featuring Kian)	2017	Non-album single
"Quick" (Duckwrth featuring Kian)	2020	SuperGood

== Awards and nominations ==
=== APRA Awards ===
The APRA Awards are held in Australia and New Zealand by the Australasian Performing Right Association to recognise songwriting skills, sales and airplay performance by its members annually. Kian has won two awards from two nominations.

Year	Nominee / work	Award	Result
2020	"Waiting" (with Jerome Farah)	Most Performed Australian Work of the Year	Won
2020	"Waiting" (with Jerome Farah)	Most Performed Alternative Work of the Year	Won

=== ARIA Music Awards ===
The ARIA Music Awards is an annual award ceremony event celebrating the Australian music industry. Kian has been nominated for two awards.

Year	Nominee / work	Award	Result	Ref.
2019	"Waiting"	Song of the Year	Nominated	
2020	"Every Hour"	Best Soul/R&B Release	Nominated	
2022	Shine	Best Soul/R&B Release	Nominated	

=== J Awards ===
The J Awards are an annual series of Australian music awards that were established by the Australian Broadcasting Corporation's youth-focused radio station Triple J. They commenced in 2005. In 2017, Kian received a nomination for the Unearthed Artist of the Year Award.

Year	Nominee / work	Award	Result
2018	Himself	Unearthed Artist of the Year	Nominated

=== Music Victoria Awards ===
The Music Victoria Awards are an annual awards night celebrating Victorian music. They commenced in 2006.

Year	Nominee / work	Award	Result	Ref.
2019	Kian	Best Regional Act/Outer Suburban Act	Nominated	
