= Aaron Wyatt =

Australian musician

Aaron Wyatt is a Noongar man, viola player, composer and conductor from Perth, Western Australia. Wyatt is recognised as the first Australian First Nations person to conduct one of the major orchestras in Australia, conducting the Melbourne Symphony Orchestra's performance of “Long Time Living Here” by Deborah Cheetham.

Wyatt was a long-term, casual musician with the West Australian Symphony Orchestra, musical director of the South Side Symphony Orchestra and conducted the Allegri Chamber Orchestra prior to relocating to Melbourne, Victoria.

He is currently an assistant lecturer at The Sir Zelman Cowen School of Music at Monash University and completing a PhD with a research focus on animated graphic notation. Wyatt is the developer of the Decibel new music ensemble's animated score notation application, the Decibel ScorePlayer for iPad, that was released in 2012.

== Awards ==
Wyatt was nominated for the 2019 Helpmann Awards in the category of "Best Music Direction" for his direction of "Speechless" by Cat Hope.

== Personal Life ==
Aaron is the son of Ken Wyatt, Western Australia's first Aboriginal governor.
