= Tash Sultana discography =

Pop recording artist discography

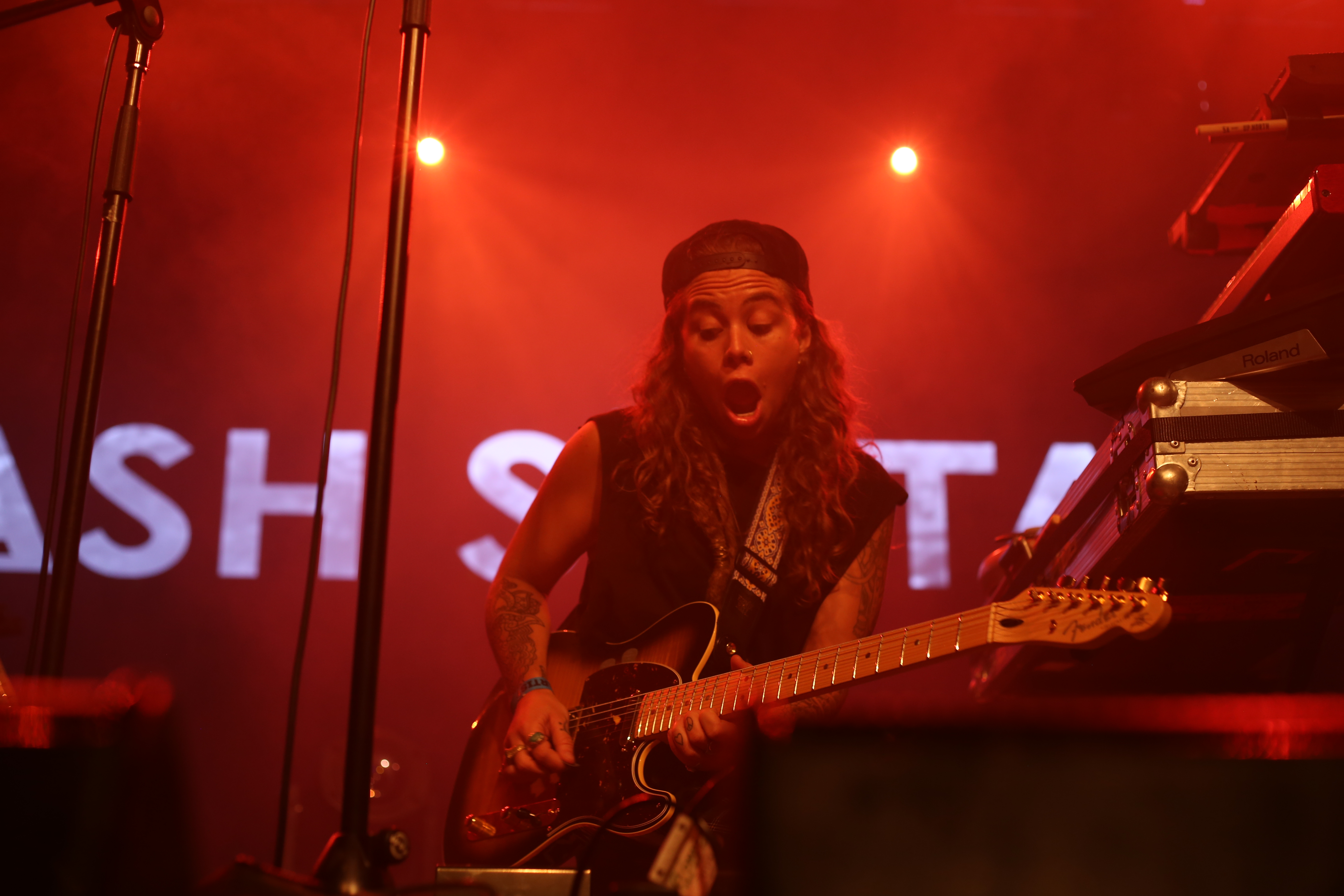
- Tash Sultana, 2017
- Studio albums: 2
- EPs: 3
- Live albums: 1
- Singles: 29

The discography of Australian singer-songwriter, musician, music producer and engineer Tash Sultana consists of two studio albums, three extended plays, and 29 singles. Sultana has achieved one number-one album, and one number-two album on Australia's ARIA Albums Chart.

The single "Jungle" was voted into third place in Triple J's Hottest 100 countdown of 2016. The following year, Sultana had three songs voted into Triple J's Hottest 100 countdown of 2017; "Mystik" placing at number 28, "Murder to the Mind" at number 43, and their Like a Version cover of MGMT's "Electric Feel" at number 78.

Sultana is credited with two double platinum-certified singles from ARIA for "Notion" and "Jungle", while "Mystik" has received single Platinum ARIA certification. Sultana has also been credited with three gold-certified singles from ARIA, for "Murder to the Mind", "Talk It Out" (their collaboration with Australian musician Matt Corby), and "Pretty Lady".

Sultana self-released their own extended play, Yin Yang in 2013, which has since been removed from the internet. They also released the now-removed singles "Higher" and "Brainflower" in 2015.

== Albums ==
=== Studio albums ===
List of studio albums, with selected chart positions
Title	Album details	Peak chart positions								Certifications
Title	Album details	AUS	CAN	GER	IRE	NLD	NZ	UK	US	Certifications
Flow State	Released: 31 August 2018; Label: Lonely Lands; Formats: CD, LP, digital download, streaming	2	22	18	67	18	12	67	51	ARIA: Gold
Terra Firma	Released: 19 February 2021; Label: Lonely Lands, Sony Music Australia; Formats: CD, LP, digital download, streaming	1	—	7	—	38	16	—	—	

=== Live albums ===
List of Live albums, with selected chart positions
Title	Details	Peak chart positions	
Title	Details	AUS	GER
MTV Unplugged, Live in Melbourne	Released: 3 June 2022; Label: Lonely Lands, Sony Music Australia; Format: Digital download, streaming, CD	— (Note: MTV Unplugged, Live in Melbourne did not enter the ARIA top 100, but debuted at number 9 on the ARIA Vinyl Albums Chart.)	12

== Extended plays ==
List of extended plays, with selected chart positions
Title	Details	Peak chart positions
Title	Details	AUS
Yin Yang	Released: 2013; Label: Self-released; Format: Digital download	—
Notion	Released: 23 September 2016; Label: Lonely Lands; Formats: CD, digital download	8
Sugar EP.	Released: 18 August 2023; Label: Lonely Lands; Format: Digital download	—
Return to the Roots	Released: 28 May 2025; Label: Lonely Lands; Format: Digital download	—

== Singles ==
List of singles, with year released, selected chart positions and certifications, and album name shown
Title	Year	Peak chart positions				Certifications	Album
Title	Year	AUS	NZ Heat.	NZ Hot	US Alt.	Certifications	Album
"Higher"	2015	—	—	—	—		Non-album singles
"Brainflower"	2015	—	—	—	—		Non-album singles
"Gemini"	2016	—	—	—	—		Notion
"Notion"	2016	—	—	—	—	ARIA: 2× Platinum; RMNZ: 2× Platinum	Notion
"Jungle"	2016	39	—	—	39	ARIA: 3× Platinum; RMNZ: 4× Platinum	Notion
"Murder to the Mind"	2017	59	8	—	—	ARIA: Gold	Flow State
"Mystik"	2017	77	8	—	—	ARIA: Platinum; RMNZ: Gold	Flow State
"Salvation"	2018	200	10	—	—		Flow State
"Harvest Love"	2018	—	—	—	—		Flow State
"Free Mind"	2018	—	—	—	—		Flow State
"Can't Buy Happiness"	2019	—	—	25	—	RMNZ: Gold	Non-album singles
"Talk It Out" (with Matt Corby)	2019	—	—	13	—	ARIA: Platinum; RMNZ: Gold	Non-album singles
"Daydreaming" (with Milky Chance)	2019	—	—	16	—		Mind the Moon
"Pretty Lady"	2020	—	—	8	—	ARIA: Gold; RMNZ: Platinum	Terra Firma
"Greed"	2020	—	—	—	—		Terra Firma
"Through the Valley (The Last of Us Part II)"	2020	—	—	—	—		Non-album single
"Beyond the Pine"	2020	—	—	—	—		Terra Firma
"Willow Tree" (featuring Jerome Farah)	2020	—	—	—	—		Terra Firma
"Sweet & Dandy"	2021	—	—	—	—		Terra Firma
"Coma"	2022	—	—	—	—		MTV Unplugged, Live in Melbourne
"High & Unsteady" (with Pierce Brothers)	2023	—	—	—	—		TBA
"James Dean"	2023	—	—	—	—		Sugar EP.
"New York"	2023	—	—	—	—		Sugar EP.
"Bitter Lovers" (with BJ the Chicago Kid)	2023	—	—	—	—		Sugar EP.
"Milk and Honey"	2025	—	—	—	—		Return to the Roots
"Hold On"	2025	—	—	—	—		Return to the Roots
"Ain't It Kinda Funny" (with City and Colour)	2025	—	—	—	—		Return to the Roots
"Something in the Water"	2026	—	—	—	—		

== Other charted songs ==
List of other charted songs, with selected chart positions
Title	Year	Peak chart positions	Certifications	Album
Title	Year	NZ Hot	Certifications	Album
"Seed (Intro)"	2018	28		Flow State
"Big Smoke"	2018	25		Flow State
"Cigarettes"	2018	15	ARIA: Gold; RMNZ: Gold	Flow State
"Seven"	2018	31		Flow State
"Musk"	2021	37		Terra Firma
"Crop Circles"	2021	38		Terra Firma
"Dream My Life Away" (featuring Josh Cashman)	2021	39		Terra Firma
"Blame It on Society"	2021	13		Terra Firma
