= Yours and Owls =

Music booking company in Wollongong, Australia

- Industry: Music
- Founded: 2010
- Founder: Ben Tillman; Adam Smith; Balunn Jones
- Headquarters: Wollongong, New South Wales, Australia
- Area served: Wollongong, Sydney, Canberra, Sunshine Coast, Melbourne
- Website: yoursandowls.com.au

Yours and Owls is a music booking company based in Wollongong, Australia. It organises the annual Yours and Owls Festival, which began in 2014.

The brand was founded when university graduates Ben Tillman, Adam Smith and Balunn Jones opened up a coffee shop in Wollongong in 2010 that would regularly host live music.Yours and Owls manages the music events of several venues on the east coast of Australia. In partnership with independent record store Music Farmers, the company also owns the record label Farmer and the Owl.

The Yours and Owls Festival began in 2014 with a line-up including Hockey Dad and Sticky Fingers and a crowd of 2,000 people. The event's popularly rapidly grew in its first few years, and was predominantly hosted opposite the beach at Stuart Park, Wollongong. In 2025, the festival hosted 30,000 attendees.

== History ==
Ben Tillman, Adam Smith and Balunn Jones, graduates of the University of Wollongong, founded Owls Cafe in Wollongong in late 2010. The Kembla Street shop was later renamed to Yours and Owls. The cafe quickly made a name for itself for hosting live music five or six nights a week. After three years of business, in September 2013, the site was sold to Daniel Radburn. He would turn it into one of the city's most iconic music venues, the 80-capacity Rad Bar. With the venue closure, the three founders pivoted the Yours and Owls brand more towards music booking and management.

After Rad Bar closed in 2019, the Yours and Owls team started booking dive bar La La La's in 2019, which has become one of Wollongong's most popular music venues. In September 2024, Yours and Owls announced they had expanded their booking roster to venues in Melbourne and the Sunshine Coast. As of March 2025, they manage 11 music venues in four states with significant control in Wollongong, booking eight venues in their home town.

== Festivals ==
=== The Farmer and the Owl ===
Yours and Owls' first music festival was called The Farmer and the Owl, hosted at the University of Wollongong in 2013. Featuring a lineup headlined by the Drones, Dappled Cities and the Laurels, it was branded as a boutique event. The festival returned to MacCabe Park, Wollongong in 2019 and 2020.

=== Yours and Owls Festival ===
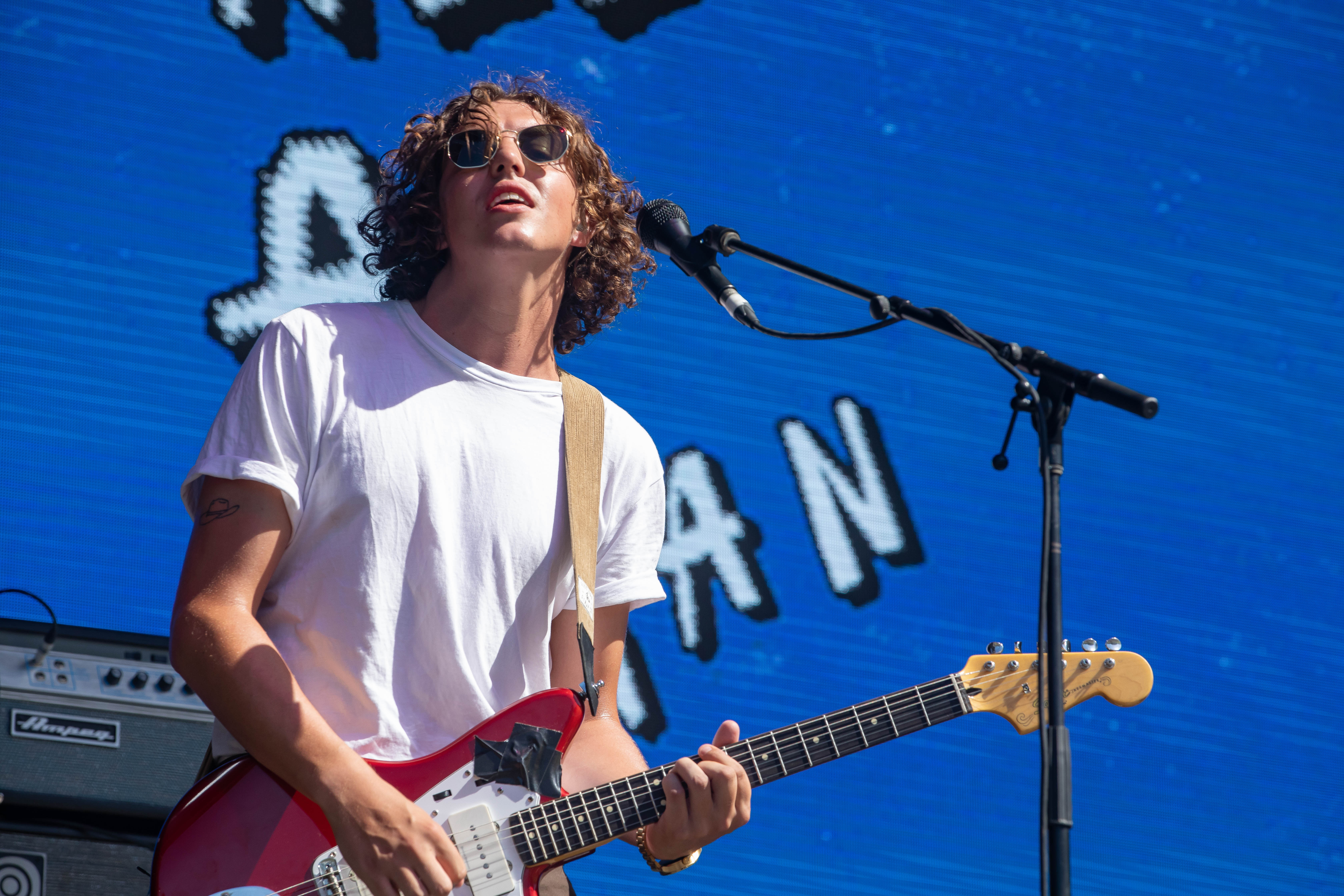
Hockey Dad featured on the first Yours and Owls Festival line-up, and were the first band signed to Farmer and the Owl.

The first Yours and Owls Festival, which has since become the company's flagship event, was held on 4 October 2014 at Stuart Park, Wollongong. The line-up included Hockey Dad, Safia, Dune Rats, Bootleg Rascal and Sticky Fingers. 2,000 people attended the inaugural one-day event. From 2015 onwards, the festival filled two days, and by 2016, crowd numbers had grown to 10,000. It has become Wollongong's biggest annual music event by far. Its 2025 iteration hosted almost 30,000 people.

In 2021, adapting to COVID-19 restrictions, the festival was held in self-contained quarters with two large rotating stages in the centre. All attendees had to be seated on chairs during performances to maintain social distancing, otherwise the music would be temporarily cut off. The 2022 edition was cancelled a few days before due to severe flooding across eastern Australia. In 2023, day one of the event ran on the same day as the Australian Indigenous Voice referendum. The organisers requested voting booths at the festival site, but the Australian Electoral Commission refused.

The 2025 event was the first music festival in New South Wales to introduce pill testing, and the first in Australia to host a government-run test facility. It gave attendees the option to test their drugs for purity and potency, before chatting to a counsellor. NSW Health tested 80 drug samples throughout the festival.

At the National Live Music Awards, Yours and Owls Festival has been nominated twice in the Best Live Music Festival category (in 2018 and 2020), and it won NSW Live Event of the Year in 2019.

== Festival lineups ==
Date, location and lineup history of Yours and Owls Festival
Ed.	Year	Dates	Location	Headliners	Notable acts	Ref.
1	2014	4 October	Stuart Park, Wollongong	Sticky Fingers	Dune Rats, the Griswolds, Hockey Dad, Safia	
2	2015	4 October	Stuart Park, Wollongong	The Preatures, the Rubens, the Smith Street Band, Gang of Youths		
3	2016	1–2 October	Stuart Park, Wollongong	PUP, The Living End, Dog, Ball Park Music, Black Mountain, Stonefield, Vera Blue, Ladyhawke		
4	2017	30 September–1 October	Stuart Park, Wollongong	At the Drive-In, The Presets	Allday, Dune Rats, Illy, Northlane, the Preatures, Safia	
5	2018	5–6 October	Stuart Park, Wollongong	Amy Shark, Courtney Barnett, Golden Features, Hot Dub Time Machine	Angie McMahon, Love Fame Tragedy, Meg Mac, Odette, Ruel, Skegss, Slumberjack, Sneaky Sound System, Thundamentals, Vera Blue	
6	2019	29–30 September	Stuart Park, Wollongong	Angus & Julia Stone, Peking Duk, Alison Wonderland	The Jungle Giants, Methyl Ethel, Ocean Alley, Hockey Dad, D.D Dumbo, Middle Kids, Cub Sport	
7	2021	17–18 April (Note: Rescheduled from the original dates of 23–24 January 2021.)	Stuart Park, Wollongong	Tones and I	Benee, Cosmo's Midnight, DMA's, Hayden James, Hockey Dad, Lime Cordiale, Pnau, Running Touch, What So Not, Winston Surfshirt	
8	2022 (Cancelled) (Note: The 2022 festival was cancelled on March 29 due to severe flooding across eastern Australia.)	2–3 April	Stuart Park, Wollongong	Hilltop Hoods	Benee, Bliss n Eso, Flight Facilities, the Jungle Giants, Peking Duk, Violent Soho	
9	2023	14–15 October	University of Wollongong	Bakar, Broods, Chet Faker, Descendents, Earl Sweatshirt, Flight Facilities, Golden Features, Hilltop Hoods, Hobo Johnson, Lil Tjay, Masego, Meg Mac, Ocean Alley, Oliver Tree, Peach Pit, Pendulum, Safia, Vera Blue		
10	2025	1–2 March (Note: The festival would have usually run in October, but it was moved to early in the new year to accommodate for headliners' availabilities.)	Flagstaff Hill, Wollongong	Fontaines D.C., Denzel Curry, the Kooks, Goo Goo Dolls	Elderbrook, Hockey Dad, Honey Dijon, JPEGMafia, the Jungle Giants, Orville Peck, Peach PRC, Salute, the Veronicas	
11	2026	3–4 October	Wollongong Foreshore and Wollongong City	Bbno$, G Flip	Ball Park Music, DMA's, Genesis Owusu, Hiatus Kaiyote, Luude, Middle Kids, Pnau, The Drones, Tkay Maidza	

== Record label ==
Farmer and the Owl
- Founded: 2014; 12 years ago
- Founder: Jeb Taylor, Ben Tillman
- Distributor: BMG
- Location: Wollongong, Australia
- Official website: farmerandtheowl.com

In May 2014, the Farmer and the Owl record label was established by Yours and Owls co-founder Ben Tillman in partnership with Music Farmers co-owner Jeb Taylor. Its first signing was Hockey Dad, and first release was their EP Dreamin'. They publish alongside international partner BMG.

== Controversies ==
On 16 April 2021, YouTube comedian Friendlyjordies uploaded a video called "Cancel Culture Kills Artists", where he detailed his negative experiences with Yours and Owls cancelling his stand-up shows through a series of emails. Yours and Owls did not release a public response.
