= Boronia (disambiguation) =

Boronia is a genus of plants. It may also refer to:

- Boronia, Victoria, Australia
  - Boronia railway station
- Boronia (album)
