= Notion =

Notion or Notions may refer to:

== Software ==
- Notion (music software), a music composition and performance program
- Notion (productivity software), a note-taking and project-management program from Notion Labs, Inc.
- Notion (window manager), the successor to the Ion window manager

== Music ==
- Notion (EP), by Tash Sultana, 2016
- "Notion" (Kings of Leon song), 2008
- Notion (magazine), a UK music and fashion quarterly
- Notion (music software), a music composition and performance program
- "Notion" (Tash Sultana song), 2016
- "Notion" (The Rare Occasions song), 2016

== Other uses ==
- Johnnie Notions, Shetland smallpox inoculator
- Notion (ancient city), a Greek city-state on the west coast of Anatolia
- Notion, ancient name of Mizen Head in Ireland
- Notion (philosophy), a reflection in the mind of real objects and phenomena in their essential features and relations
- Notions (sewing), small articles used in sewing and haberdashery
- Notions (Winchester College), the Winchester slang
