= Rebuild Repeat =

Studio album by Hockey Dad
- Released: 14 June 2024
- Studio: Hercules St, Sydney; Stranded, Wollongong; The Gallery BMG, Sydney; Long Life, Sydney
- Genre: Indie rock
- Length: 30:20
- Label: Farmer & the Owl
- Producer: Alex Burnett; Oli Horton; Tim McArtney

Hockey Dad chronology
Live at the Drive In (2021)	Rebuild Repeat (2024)

Singles from Rebuild Repeat
- 1. "Still Have Room" Released: 30 October 2023; 2. "Base Camp" Released: 23 February 2024; 3. "Safety Pin" Released: 23 April 2024

Rebuild Repeat is the fourth studio album by Australian indie rock band Hockey Dad. It was released on 14 June 2024 via Farmer & the Owl. The album was preceded by three singles, "Still Have Room", "Base Camp" and "Safety Pin". It was supported by an Australian tour from June 2024.

== Composition ==
Their first new studio album in four years following Brain Candy in 2020, Hockey Dad said Rebuild Repeat follows a "muddy, hazy couple of years for [the band]", and that the title describes the process of making a new album – "You knock down what you had from the past, re-design, rebuild it and repeat."

== Release and promotion ==
On 30 October 2023, Hockey Dad released the lead single "Still Have Room" alongside a music video filmed in Wollongong. It was their first new song in over a year, following the standalone "T's to Cross" in mid-2022. In February 2024, amidst touring in the United States, the second single "Base Camp" was released. The album's title and cover artwork was announced on 26 February 2024, with a scheduled release date of 14 June 2024. They will tour across Australia from June 2024 in support of Rebuild Repeat.

== Track listing ==
All tracks are written by William Fleming, Zach Stephenson, Alex Burnett, and Oli Horton.

Rebuild Repeat track listing
No.	Title	Length
1.	"Base Camp"	3:25
2.	"Still Have Room"	2:23
3.	"Safety Pin"	2:19
4.	"Wreck & Ruin"	2:25
5.	"Burning Sand"	2:07
6.	"That's on You"	3:07
7.	"Seething"	2:42
8.	"Unhinged"	2:22
9.	"Backup Plan"	2:35
10.	"Road Signs"	3:53
11.	"Dancing on the Other Hand"	3:02
Total length:		30:20

== Personnel ==
Hockey Dad

- Zach Stephenson – vocals, guitar on "Still Have Room"
- William Fleming – drums

Technical

- Alex Burnett – production, engineering, mixing
- Oli Horton – production, engineering, mixing
- Tim McArtney – production, engineering, mixing
- George Georgiadis – mastering

== Charts ==
Chart performance for Rebuild Repeat
Chart (2024)	Peak position
Australian Albums (ARIA)	15
