= Excalidraw =

Web-based whiteboard and diagramming app

- Original author: Christopher Chedeau
- Developer: Excalidraw s.r.o.
- Release: 1 January 2020; 6 years ago
- Stable release: 0.18.1 / 21 April 2026; 5 months ago
- Written in: TypeScript
- Operating system: Web-based (cross-platform)
- Platform: Web browser
- Type: Collaboration, Diagramming
- License: MIT License
- Website: excalidraw.com
- Repository: github.com/excalidraw/excalidraw

Excalidraw is an open-source, web-based virtual whiteboard and diagramming application. It is used to create diagrams, wireframes, and sketches within a web browser without requiring account registration. The software features a characteristic hand-drawn visual style and supports real-time multi-user collaboration using client-side end-to-end encryption. Excalidraw is released under the MIT License and is maintained by Excalidraw s.r.o., a company based in Brno, Czech Republic.

== History ==
Excalidraw was created on 1 January 2020 by Christopher Chedeau, a software engineer at Meta Platforms. Chedeau, who previously co-created React Native and Prettier, initially developed the application as a personal project before registering the domain on 3 January 2020. Within its first months, the project attracted open-source contributors who assisted in expanding its features and rewriting the codebase into TypeScript and React.

By early 2021, day-to-day operations moved to Czech developers David Luzar and Milos Vetesnik. In May 2021, the team incorporated Excalidraw s.r.o. in Brno and launched a commercial cloud-based version named Excalidraw+ to fund the open-source project's development. By May 2026, the main open-source repository on GitHub had accumulated over 123,000 stars.

== Features and architecture ==
The application provides an infinite canvas for geometric shapes, lines, arrows, text, and freehand drawing. Its visual presentation relies on Rough.js, a JavaScript graphics library that alters standard vector paths to mimic irregular, hand-drawn lines.

Excalidraw operates as a Progressive web application (PWA), allowing local installation and offline usage, saving data natively to local browser storage. Files use a native, JSON-based extension format (.excalidraw), and canvases can be exported to PNG or SVG formats.

Real-time collaboration sessions are executed using Socket.IO via a relay server. Data transmission uses the browser's native Web Cryptography API to achieve end-to-end encryption. A symmetric AES key is generated on the client side and appended to the sharing URL as a fragment identifier (following the # character). Because web browsers do not transmit URL fragments to HTTP servers, the data remains unreadable to the distribution server.

== Ecosystem ==
Excalidraw is distributed as an npm package, allowing third-party developers to embed the whiteboard component directly into external React web applications.

Community-developed extensions integrate the application's file format into text editors and note-taking systems, including Visual Studio Code and Obsidian. The platform also has native integrations in commercial platforms such as Notion and HackerRank.

== Reception ==
Google's developer relations team published a technical case study on Excalidraw as a reference implementation for Progressive Web Apps. The analysis highlighted the software's adoption of advanced web platform capabilities, specifically its utilization of the File System Access API and native Clipboard API to replicate desktop software behavior within a web browser environment.
