= Today We're the Greatest =

Studio album by Middle Kids
- Released: 19 March 2021
- Length: 40:38
- Label: Domino
- Producer: Lars Stalfors

Middle Kids chronology
New Songs for Old Problems (2019)	Today We're the Greatest (2021)	Faith Crisis Pt 1 (2024)

Singles from Today We're the Greatest
- 1. "R U 4 Me?" Released: 14 October 2020; 2. "Questions" Released: January 2021; 3. "Cellophane (Brain)" Released: 11 February 2021; 4. "Stacking Chairs" Released: 5 March 2021; 5. "Today We're the Greatest" Released: 19 March 2021

Today We're the Greatest is the second studio album by Australian alternative-indie rock band Middle Kids, released on 19 March 2021. The album peaked at number 5 on the ARIA Charts. At the 2021 ARIA Music Awards, the album won Best Rock Album. At the J Awards of 2021, the album was nominated for Australian Album of the Year.

== Critical reception ==
Professional ratings
Review scores
Source	Rating
AllMusic	3.5/5 stars
Clash	8/10
Dork	4/5 stars
The Line of Best Fit	8/10
Paste	8.1/10
The Sydney Morning Herald	3.5/5 stars

Today We're the Greatest received positive acclaim from critics. Writing for The Sydney Morning Herald, Craig Mathieson called it "an impressive record" that "believes in discovery and leans towards affirmation". Ben Salmon of Paste said the album "sounds great, and whatever it lacks in the element of surprise, it makes up for with consistency." Compared to their previous album, Lost Friends (2018), Dave Beech of Clash concluded Today We're the Greatest "is calmer and more considered record," and "harbours warmth and richness in abundance, but a sense of fragility and vulnerability also." Reviewing for Dork, Edie McQueen praised the sonic details with the incorporation of "the tweeting of birds, the patter of rain, and even the beating heart of members’ Hannah Joy and Tim Fitz’s unborn son, taken from a sonogram."

== Track listing ==
All tracks are written by Hannah Joy and Tim Fitz, except where noted.

Today We're the Greatest track listing
No.	Title	Writer(s)	Length
1.	"Bad Neighbours"		3:10
2.	"Cellophane (Brain)"		3:30
3.	"R U 4 Me?"		2:49
4.	"Questions"		2:53
5.	"Lost in Los Angeles"		3:48
6.	"Golden Star"		3:43
7.	"Summer Hill"		4:21
8.	"Some People Stay in our Hearts Forever"		3:06
9.	"Run with You"		3:25
10.	"I Don't Care"	Joy; Fitz; Martin Doherty	2:58
11.	"Stacking Chairs"		3:08
12.	"Today We're the Greatest"	Joy; Fitz; Tommy English	3:47
Total length:			40:38

== Personnel ==
Middle Kids

- Hannah Joy – writing (all tracks), vocals, guitars, synth, piano
- Tim Fitz – writing (all tracks), bass guitar, guitars, banjo, pedal steel, synth, piano
- Harry Day – Ludwig drums, percussion

Additional musicians

- Martin Doherty – writing (track 10)
- Tommy English – writing (track 12)
- Nate Willet – guitars (track 10)
- Brendan Champion – brass (track 4)
- Daniel Chae – strings (track 1)

Technical

- Lars Stalfors – producer, mixing, engineering
- Tim Fitz – co-producer
- Joe Laporta – mastering
- Kye Berzle – producer, engineering (track 7)
- Scott Horscroft – co-producer (track 12)
- Maclay Heriot – photos
- Ben Lewis Giles – design

== Charts ==
Chart performance for Today We're the Greatest
Chart (2021)	Peak position
Australian Albums (ARIA)	5
Scottish Albums (Official Charts)	87
