= Dreamin' (EP) =

EP by Hockey Dad
- Released: 27 June 2014
- Recorded: 2014
- Studio: Mixed Business Studios (Fitzroy, Victoria); Turtlerock Studios (Leichardt, New South Wales)
- Genre: Surf rock, Garage rock
- Length: 19:33
- Label: Farmer & The Owl
- Producer: Tom Iansek

Hockey Dad chronology
Dreamin' (2014)	Boronia (2016)

Singles from Dreamin'
- 1. "Lull City" Released: 26 November 2013; 2. "I Need A Woman" Released: 26 June 2014

Dreamin' is the debut EP from Australian surf rock duo Hockey Dad. The EP was released in June 2014 by Farmer & The Owl.

== Background ==
Hockey Dad was formed in 2013 by friends Zach Stephenson and William Fleming. Their first live performance was at Rad Bar, a small music venue in Wollongong, where the two worked part-time.

Dreamin' was the first record to be released under label Farmer & The Owl, a co-operation between Wollongong-based music operator Yours & Owls and Music Farmers, a record store from the region.

== Release ==
The EP was released on 27 June 2014. It was met with critical acclaim, and got the attention of Lio Cerezo, founder of Canine Records, whom with the band later signed a deal with.

== Track listing ==
All tracks written by Zach Stephenson and William Fleming.

No.	Title	Length
1.	"Lull City"	3:12
2.	"I Need a Woman"	4:24
3.	"Beach House"	3:52
4.	"Seaweed"	2:55
5.	"Babes"	5:08
Total length:		19:33

== Personnel ==
Adapted from the album's liner notes.

=== Musicians ===
Hockey Dad

- Zach Stephenson – guitar, lead vocals
- William Fleming – drums

Additional performers

- Stephen Bourke – bass

=== Technical ===
- Tom Iansek – producer, mixer
- Rick O'Neil – mastering
- Brett Randall – art direction
