= Join the Club (disambiguation) =

"Join the Club" is an episode of The Sopranos

Join the Club may also refer to:

- Join the Club (band), a Philippine rock band
- Join the Club (album), by Lucy Spraggan, or the title track
- Join the Club, an album by As December Falls, 2023
- "Join the Club", a 1996 song by Reel Big Fish from Turn The Radio Off
- "Join the Club", a 2013 song by Bring Me the Horizon from Sempiternal
- "Join the Club", a 2018 single by Hockey Dad from Blend Inn

== See also ==
- "Join Our Club", a song by Saint Etienne
