= Faith Crisis Pt 1 =

2024 album by Middle Kids

Studio album by Middle Kids
- Released: 16 February 2024
- Length: 36:35
- Label: Lucky Number
- Producer: Jonathan Gilmore; Tim Fitz

Middle Kids chronology
Today We're the Greatest (2021)	Faith Crisis Pt 1 (2024)

Singles from Faith Crisis Pt 1
- 1. "Bootleg Firecracker" Released: 30 May 2023; 2. "Highlands" Released: 26 July 2023; 3. "Dramamine" Released: 20 October 2023; 4. "Bend" Released: 30 November 2023; 5. "Terrible News" Released: 11 January 2024

Faith Crisis Pt 1 is the third studio album by Australian alternative rock band Middle Kids. It was released on 16 February 2024 via Lucky Number Music, and debuted at number 20 on the ARIA Albums Chart. It was recorded in Eastbourne, United Kingdom, and produced by Jonathan Gilmore. Preceded by five singles including "Bootleg Firecracker", "Highlands" and "Dramamine", the band will embark on tour of Australia and the United States in May 2024 to promote the album.

At the 2024 ARIA Music Awards, the album was nominated for Best Rock Album. At the 2024 J Awards, the album was nominated for Australian Album of the Year.

== Background and composition ==
In March 2021, Middle Kids released their second studio album, Today We're the Greatest. It won Best Rock Album at the 2021 ARIA Music Awards, and peaked at number five on the ARIA Charts.

Faith Crisis Pt 1 was recorded in five weeks from June 2022 in Eastbourne, United Kingdom, alongside producer Jonathan Gilmore. In these sessions, the band experimented with synths and organs for the first time. Frontwoman Hannah Joy said that – unlike their previous albums, which were very intertwined with their daily lives, with "snippets written in sound checks, visiting a studio whilst on the road [and] recording vocals after doing the dishes at home" – in making Faith Crisis Pt 1, they sought separation from daily life and the going-ons of society by "carv[ing] out the space and world for making this record, which, yeah, was awesome – but absolutely fried the mainframes".

The lyrical themes on Faith Crisis Pt 1 explore the role of belief, particularly in a society deprived of hope, according to Joy. Despite admitting the album title "could neg some people", she said it alludes to an "expectation there will be a 'Pt 2' (or more) to the crisis."

== Release and promotion ==
On 30 May 2023, the lead single "Bootleg Firecracker" was released alongside a music video. Described as a song about "the power, magic, and risk of intimacy", it marked a sonic departure from their previous work. A "nighttime piano" version of the track would later be released on streaming platforms. The second single, "Highlands", was issued on 26 July. The track was musically inspired by frontwoman Hannah Joy's Scottish heritage. "Dramamine" was released as the third single on 20 October, when the album's title, artwork and release date was officially announced. "Bend" followed on 30 November, with "Terrible News" released as the fifth and final single on 11 January 2024.

Beginning from May 2024, Middle Kids will embark on a tour of Australia and the United States to promote the album.

== Reception ==
Professional ratings
Review scores
Source	Rating
The AU Review	4/5 stars
Far Out	3/5 stars
The Line of Best Fit	7/10

Writing for The AU Review, Dylan Marshall said Faith Crisis Pt 1 is relatable, reliable and "filled with hits and choruses that will be stuck in your head for days on end," predicting it will appear on several year-end lists. Poetic Justice Magazine noted that the album contains "some impressive and memorable anthems". Matt Young of The Line of Best Fit praised the album's themes, and wrote that "[d]espite the existential territory that informs the lyrical and musical direction the trio do manage to wring many buoyant melodies and arrangements from the pain." He also noted that with Gilmore as producer, his influence from working with the 1975 trickled into Middle Kids' work.

== Track listing ==
All tracks are written by Hannah Joy and Tim Fitz, except tracks 1, 4 and 8 (solely by Joy), and track 12 (with Harry Day).

Faith Crisis Pt 1 track listing
No.	Title	Length
1.	"Petition"	1:45
2.	"Dramamine"	2:57
3.	"The Blessings"	3:16
4.	"The Blessings Interlude"	1:14
5.	"Bootleg Firecracker"	3:20
6.	"Highlands"	3:31
7.	"Bend"	3:50
8.	"Go to Sleep on Me"	2:41
9.	"Terrible News"	2:52
10.	"Philosophy"	2:54
11.	"Your Side, Forever"	3:31
12.	"Your Side Interlude"	1:34
13.	"All in My Head" (featuring David Le'aupepe)	3:10
Total length:		36:35

== Personnel ==
Musicians

- Hannah Joy – lead vocals, guitar, writing (all tracks)
- Tim Fitz – bass guitar, writing (tracks 2–3, 5–6, 9–13), producer, engineer; mixing (tracks 4, 12)
- Harry Day – drums, writing (track 12)
- David Le'aupepe – vocals (track 13)
- Macie Stewart – strings (tracks 9, 10, 12)
- Jy-Perry Banks – pedal steel (tracks 5–6)
- Brendan Champion – brass (tracks 7, 9)

Additional personnel

- Jonathan Gilmore – producer, engineer
- Lars Stalfors – mixing (tracks 1–3, 5–11, 13)
- Matthew Neighbour – mixing assistant
- Ruari O'Flaherty – mastering
- Connor Dewhurst – album design
- Pooneh Ghana – cover art photograph

== Charts ==
Chart performance for Faith Crisis Pt 1
Chart (2024)	Peak position
Australian Albums (ARIA)	20
UK Independent Albums (OCC)	49
