= Pretty Lady (Tash Sultana song) =

2020 song by Tash Sultana

Single by Tash Sultana

from the album Terra Firma
- Released: 9 April 2020
- Length: 4:37
- Label: Lonely Lands; Sony Music Australia
- Songwriters: Tash Sultana; Matt Corby; Dann Hume
- Producer: Tash Sultana

Tash Sultana singles chronology
| "Daydreaming" (2019) | "Pretty Lady" (2020) | "Greed" (2020) |

Music video
- "Pretty Lady" on YouTube

"Pretty Lady" is a song by Australian alternative artist Tash Sultana, released on 9 April 2020. It was released through Lonely Lands Records and Sony Music Australia as the lead single from Sultana's second studio album, Terra Firma (2021).

At the 2020 ARIA Music Awards, the song was nominated for Best Soul/R&B Release.

The song was nominated for Most Performed Blues and Roots Work at the APRA Music Awards of 2021

The song won Best Single at the 2021 Rolling Stone Australia Awards.

== Background and release ==
On 8 April, Sultana announced via social media that their first single for 2020, "Pretty Lady" was being released the next day, with a premiere on triple j Breakfast to come.

The following day, 9 April, triple j Breakfast premiered "Pretty Lady", with the track being released immediately following.

== Live performances ==
Sultana performed the single live for the first time on 9 April 2020, performing an internet live streamed concert on YouTube.

== Music video ==
Sultana released the music video for "Pretty Lady" the day the single was released.

== Credits and personnel ==
- Tash Sultana – producer, songwriter
- Matt Corby – songwriter
- Dann Hume – songwriter

== Charts ==
Chart performance for "Pretty Lady"
| Chart (2020) | Peak position |
|---|---|
| New Zealand Hot Singles (RMNZ) | 8 |

== Certifications ==
| Region | Certification | Certified units/sales |
|---|---|---|
| Australia (ARIA) | Gold | 35,000^{‡} |
| New Zealand (RMNZ) | Platinum | 30,000^{‡} |
^{‡} Sales+streaming figures based on certification alone.
