= Stacking Chairs =

Single by Middle Kids

from the album Today We're the Greatest
- Released: 5 March 2021
- Label: Middle Kids, UMA
- Songwriters: Hannah Joy, Tim Fritz
- Producer: Lars Stalfors

Middle Kids singles chronology
"Cellophane (Brain)" (2025)	"Stacking Chairs" (2021)	"Today We're the Greatest" (2025)

"Stacking Chairs" is a song by Australian group Middle Kids released on 5 March 2021 as the fourth single from the group's second studio album, Today We're the Greatest.

In a statement, Hannah Joy said the song is a reflection on marriage to bandmate Tim Fitz, saying, "Going on the journey of marriage with Tim has been profound. It is very liberating having someone see you in your entirety and stay. Tim embodies that kind of 'stacking chairs' love – he's not just about the party. He's around afterward when I'm tired and ugly and loves me in those moments."

The W.A.M. Bleakley directed music video was released in August 2021.

The song polled at number 39 in the Triple J Hottest 100, 2021. The song was certified gold in Australia in 2025.

== Reception ==
In an album review, Sose Fuamoli from Double J called it the "candid and intimate highlight" of the album, saying "The single is classic Middle Kids; it's everything we know and love about the Sydney band. Vivid strokes of melody are painted beautifully as Hannah Joy's candid and intimate lyricism shines."

== Certifications ==
Region	Certification	Certified units/sales
Australia (ARIA)	Gold	35,000^{‡}
^{‡} Sales+streaming figures based on certification alone.
