= J Awards of 2018 =

Annual Australian music awards

- Date: November 2018
- Venue: Australia
- Website: abc.net.au/triplej

The J Award of 2018 is the fourteenth annual J Awards, established by the Australian Broadcasting Corporation's youth-focused radio station Triple J. The announcement comes at the culmination of Ausmusic Month (November). For the fifth year, four awards were presented; Australian Album of the Year, Double J Artist of the Year, Australian Music Video of the Year and Unearthed Artist of the Year.

The eligible period took place between November 2017 and October 2018. The winners were announced live on air on Triple J in November 2018.

== Awards ==
=== Australian Album of the Year ===
| Artist | Album Title | Result |
|---|---|---|
| Middle Kids | Lost Friends | Won |
| Amy Shark | Love Monster | Nominated |
| Camp Cope | How to Socialise & Make Friends | Nominated |
| Courtney Barnett | Tell Me How You Really Feel | Nominated |
| DMA's | For Now | Nominated |
| Hockey Dad | Blend Inn | Nominated |
| Ocean Alley | Chiaroscuro | Nominated |
| Polaris | The Mortal Coil | Nominated |
| Rüfüs Du Sol | SOLACE | Nominated |
| Tash Sultana | Flow State | Nominated |

=== Double J Artist of the Year ===
| Artist | Result |
|---|---|
| Geoffrey Gurrumul Yunupingu | Won |
| John Butler Trio | Nominated |
| Mojo Juju | Nominated |
| Rolling Blackouts Coastal Fever | Nominated |
| Sampa the Great | Nominated |

=== Australian Video of the Year ===
| Director | Artist and Song | Result |
|---|---|---|
| Claudia Sangiorgi Dalimore | Mojo Juju - "Native Tongue" | Won |
| JAEN Collective | B Wise - "Feel Something" | Nominated |
| Guss Mallmann | DZ Deathrays - "Like People" | Nominated |
| Harry Deadman | Golden Vessel featuring Elkkle, E^ST & Duckwrth - "BIGBRIGHT" | Nominated |
| Sanjay De Silva | Sampa the Great featuring Nicole Gumbe - "Black Girl Magik" | Nominated |

=== Unearthed Artist of the Year ===
| Artist | Result |
|---|---|
| Kwame | Won |
| Angie McMahon | Nominated |
| G Flip | Nominated |
| KIAN | Nominated |
| Slowly Slowly | Nominated |
