= New Songs for Old Problems =

EP by Middle Kids
- Released: 24 May 2019
- Length: 21:42
- Label: Middle Kids / EMI

Middle Kids chronology
Lost Friends (2018)	New Songs for Old Problems (2019)	Today We're the Greatest (2021)

Singles from Lost Friends
- 1. "Real Thing" Released: March 2019

Professional ratings
Review scores
Source	Rating
DIY	3/5 stars
Dork	4/5 stars

New Songs for Old Problems is the second extended play by Australian alternative-indie rock band Middle Kids. It was released in May 2019 and peaked at number 44 on the ARIA Charts.

== Track listing ==
New Songs for Old Problems track listing
No.	Title	Length
1.	"Beliefs & Prayers"	3:40
2.	"Salt Eyes"	3:29
3.	"Needle"	3:18
4.	"Real Thing"	3:10
5.	"Call Me Snowflake"	4:07
6.	"Big Softy"	4:00
Total length:		21:42

== Personnel ==
Middle Kids

- Hannah Joy – writing, vocals, guitars, piano, accordion
- Tim Fitz – writing, guitars, bass guitar, producer, engineer (tracks 3–6)
- Harry Day – drums, percussion

Additional personnel

- Jack Nigro – engineer (track 1)
- Charlie Stavish – engineer (track 2)
- Jack Aron – mixing (tracks 1–3, 5–6)
- Mark "Spike" Stent – mixing (track 4)
- Matt Colton – mastering
- C.M. Ruiz – art

== Charts ==
Chart performance for New Songs for Old Problems
Chart (2019)	Peak position
Australian Albums (ARIA)	44

== Release history ==
Release history and formats for New Songs for Old Problems
Region	Date	Format	Label	Catalogue
Various	24 May 2019	CD, digital download, streaming, vinyl	Middle Kids / EMI Music / Universal Music Australia / Domino	7755198 / RUG1011T / LUCKY129T
