= Edge of Town =

Single by Middle Kids

from the album Middle Kids
- Released: May 2016
- Label: Middle Kids, UMA
- Songwriter: Hannah Joy
- Producer: Tim Fritz

Middle Kids singles chronology
"Edge of Town" (2016)	"Never Start" (2017)

Music video
- "Edge of Town" on YouTube

"Edge of Town" is a song by Australian group Middle Kids released in May 2016 as their debut single and lead single from the group's self-titled debut EP. The song is a "non-fictional account of a girl who got swallowed up by the earth".

In November 2016, the song won FBi Radio's Northern Lights competition and shortly after, the group performed at the Iceland Airwaves music festival in Reykjavík.

In February 2017, the group made their US television debut and performed the song on Conan.

The song was certified gold in Australia in 2019 and platinum in February 2024.

== Background ==
Middle Kids uploaded "Edge of Town" onto Triple J Unearthed and became "the blueprint" for the group's formula. In 2018, band member Tim Fitz said "I think there was a spirit in that song that felt very special and I think in some ways that set at a certain direction for how we were trying to write songs." Hannah Joy added "I feel that it's optimistic. It's obviously very angsty, but there is a thread of hope through it all. I feel like it's definitely dealing with a lot of kind of angst and confusion and pain but there's definitely, through it all, an unswerving hope."

== Music video ==
The music video was directed by Tim Fitz and Ro Miles and released on 20 May 2016.

== Reception ==
Alexandra Koster from FBi Radio said "'Edge of Town' is as catchy as it is complex, guiding us through the tale of a girl who is swallowed up by the earth. Joy's exquisite vocals aren't just a whole lot of fun – they're also deeply intelligent... And here I am, on one knee, giving them all the praise I can muster."

== Certifications ==
Region	Certification	Certified units/sales
Australia (ARIA)	Platinum	70,000^{‡}
^{‡} Sales+streaming figures based on certification alone.
