= Middle Kids (EP) =

EP by Middle Kids
- Released: 17 February 2017
- Length: 20:04
- Label: Middle Kids / UMA

Middle Kids chronology
Middle Kids (2017)	Lost Friends (2018)

Singles from Middle Kids
- 1. "Edge of Town" Released: May 2016; 2. "Never Start" Released: January 2017; 3. "Old River" Released: April 2017

Professional ratings
Review scores
Source	Rating
AllMusic	3.5/5 stars

Middle Kids is the debut extended play by Australian alternative-indie rock band Middle Kids. It was released in February 2017 and peaked at number 26 on the ARIA Charts.

== Track listing ==
Middle Kids track listing
No.	Title	Length
1.	"Your Love"	3:18
2.	"Edge of Town"	3:45
3.	"Never Start"	3:19
4.	"Fire in Your Eyes"	3:03
5.	"Old River"	3:32
6.	"Doing It Right"	3:07
Total length:		20:04

== Charts ==
Chart performance for Middle Kids
Chart (2017)	Peak position
Australian Albums (ARIA)	26

== Release history ==
Release history and formats for Middle Kids
Region	Date	Format	Label	Catalogue
Various	17 February 2017	CD, digital download, streaming, vinyl	Middle Kids / Universal Music Australia / Domino	5728111 / RUG825
