= Rad Bar =

Music venue in Wollongong, Australia

- Interactive map of Rad Bar
- Address: Lang's Corner; 95A Crown St; Wollongong, NSW 2500; Australia
- Coordinates: 34.4258°S 150.8972°E
- Owner: Daniel Radburn
- Capacity: 80 people
- Field size: 80 square meters

Construction
- Opened: 15 September 2013
- Closed: 16 August 2019
- Demolished: 2019

Rad Bar was a music venue in Wollongong, New South Wales, Australia. It opened in 2013 and played a crucial role in the development of young musicians and bands from the region. At the time, it was Wollongong's only dedicated live music venue of its size, and was considered iconic in the local scene. The bar was closed in August 2019, when its block was demolished to make way for office towers.

== History ==
Ben Tillman, Adam Smith and Balunn Jones, who were graduates of the University of Wollongong, were the previous owners of the site, a coffee shop called Yours and Owls, which hosted live music five or six nights a week. Opening in 2010, it quickly became an important hub for local artists wanting to refine their live show for bigger audiences. The cafe was sold and closed in 2013, and the three owners pivoted their brand more towards music booking and festivals. Taking over the site was drummer Daniel Radburn, who was committed to keep hosting live music. The newly renamed Rad Bar opened on 15 September 2013.

It’s impossible to find another room with that atmosphere again. It’s just iconic. The stairs are iconic – they’re so ugly, so impractical!

— Zac Stephenson, Hockey Dad

Rad Bar's floor size was less than 80 square meters and had a maximum capacity of about 80 people, making for an intimate and raucous live music setting. It was the only dedicated music space of its size in Wollongong. The venue was credited for nurturing many young bands across the Illawarra, and being a unique setting where they could "learn how to play". Prominent local bands to have come through Rad Bar in their early years included Pacific Avenue, Totally Unicorn, the Pinheads, The Nuclear Family, Totty, Los Pintar, and most notably Hockey Dad, who played at the venue on its first trading night.

Not long after Radburn took over the venue in 2013, the Lang's Corner block, which was built in 1933, was sold to developers for $4.5 million. The property then changed hands multiple times until May 2017, when a proposal was issued to turn the building into a high-rise office tower. The plans for demolition attracted intense criticism from the Wollongong music community. In April 2019, Radburn announced that all tenants of the block were being told to vacate.

Rad Bar's final trading night was 16 August 2019, with Sydney band Dear Seattle headlining. There were concerns that after its closure, the youth music scene in the Illawarra would lose momentum. In October 2019, Yours and Owls opened the 150-cap La La La's dive bar and music venue a short distance away in Globe Lane.

The Lang's Corner block was turned into an 11-storey office tower, which opened in 2022.

One of the stages at the 2019 Yours and Owls Festival was named after Rad Bar in honour of the venue's legacy. This occurred again for the 2023 festival.
