= Anthems: A Celebration of Broken Social Scene's You Forgot It in People =

Compilation album by various artists
- Released: June 6, 2025
- Label: Arts & Crafts

Anthems: A Celebration of Broken Social Scene's You Forgot It in People is a cover album of the Broken Social Scene album You Forgot It in People, released by Arts & Crafts on June 6, 2025.

== Production ==
Each song on the album is a cover by another artist invited to reimagine a track from Broken Social Scene's 2003 album You Forgot It in People.

The album was announced in April 2025 along with the release of its first track, Maggie Rogers and Sylvan Esso's version of "Anthems for a Seventeen Year-Old Girl".

The Middle Kids' version of "Cause = Time" was released on May 30, 2025 as the second single.

== Track listing ==
| No. | Title | Performed by | Length |
|---|---|---|---|
| 1. | "Capture the Flag" | Ouri |
| 2. | "KC Accidental" | Hovvdy |
| 3. | "Stars and Sons" | Toro y Moi |
| 4. | "Almost Crimes" | Miya Folick & Hand Habits |
| 5. | "Looks Just like the Sun" | The Weather Station |
| 6. | "Pacific Theme" | Mikey Coltun of Mdou Moctar |
| 7. | "Anthems for a Seventeen Year-Old Girl" | Maggie Rogers & Sylvan Esso | 3:36 |
| 8. | "Cause = Time" | Middle Kids |
| 9. | "Late Nineties Bedroom Rock for the Missionaries" | Benny Sings |
| 10. | "Shampoo Suicide" | The Spirit of the Beehive |
| 11. | "Lover's Spit" | serpentwithfeet |
| 12. | "Ainda Sou Seu Moleque" | Sessa |
| 13. | "Pitter Patter Goes My Heart" | Babygirl |
