= Never Start =

Single by Middle Kids

from the album Middle Kids
- Released: 17 January 2017
- Recorded: Sydney
- Label: Middle Kids, UMA
- Songwriter(s): Hannah Joy
- Producer(s): Tim Fritz

Middle Kids singles chronology
"Edge of Town" (2016)	"Never Start" (2017)	"Old River" (2017)

Music video
- "Never Start" on YouTube

"Never Start"' is a song by Australian group Middle Kids released in January 2017 as the second single from the group's self-titled debut EP. The song did not enter any official chart, but in the week after released, peaked at number 4 on both the hot 100 breakers and Triple J Spins. The following week, the song peaked at number 1 on the Triple J Spins.

The song poled at number 127 in the Triple J Hottest 200 in 2017.

The song was certified gold in Australia in 2019.

== Music video ==
The music video was directed by Emile Frederick and released on 17 January 2017.

== Reception ==
Robin Murray from Clash Music called the song an "adorably ramshackle indie pop cut" adding, "All helter-skelter guitar lines and bubblegum melody, it's topped off by Hannah Joy's bittersweet vocal."

== Certifications ==
Region	Certification	Certified units/sales
Australia (ARIA)	Gold	35,000^{‡}
^{‡} Sales+streaming figures based on certification alone.
