= Boronia (album) =

Studio album by Hockey Dad
- Released: August 12, 2016
- Genre: Surf pop; garage rock
- Length: 39:58
- Label: Kanine; Farmer & the Owl
- Producer: Jeff Rosenstock

Hockey Dad chronology
Dreamin' (2014)	Boronia (2016)	Blend Inn (2018)

Singles from Boronia
- 1. "I Need a Woman" Released: June 26, 2014; 2. "Can't Have Them" Released: June 23, 2015; 3. "So Tired" Released: May 18, 2016; 4. "Jump the Gun" Released: July 31, 2016; 5. "A Night Out With" Released: August 31, 2016

Professional ratings
Review scores
Source	Rating
Consequence of Sound	B
Pitchfork	5.6/10
Rolling Stone	3/5 stars

Boronia is the debut album from Australian duo Hockey Dad. The album was released in August 2016 by Farmer & the Owl.

== Track listing ==
All music is composed by Zach Stephenson and William Fleming.

No.	Title	Length
1.	"Can't Have Them"	3:10
2.	"A Night Out With"	3:14
3.	"So Tired"	3:38
4.	"Jump the Gun"	2:31
5.	"Hunny Bunny"	2:28
6.	"I Need a Woman"	4:24
7.	"Laura"	3:06
8.	"Raygun"	2:13
9.	"Dylan's Place"	4:46
10.	"Two Forever"	4:58
11.	"Grange"	5:14
Total length:		39:58

== Personnel ==
=== Musicians ===
Hockey Dad

- Zach Stephenson – guitar, lead vocals (1–11)
- William Fleming – drums (1–11)

Additional musicians

- Stephen Bourke – bass guitar (1–11)
- Yuko Nishiyama – backing vocals (2)
- Tom Iansek – piano (1–11)

=== Technical ===
- Jeff Rosenstock – production (1–11)

== Charts ==
Chart (2016)	Peak position
Australian Albums (ARIA)	55
