= Murder to the Mind =

Single by Tash Sultana

from the album Flow State
- Released: 21 April 2017
- Label: Lonely Lands
- Songwriter: Tash Sultana
- Producers: Tash Sultana; Nikita Miltiadou

Tash Sultana singles chronology
"Jungle" (2016)	"Murder to the Mind" (2017)	"Mystik" (2017)

"Murder to the Mind" is a song by Australian alternative rock artist Tash Sultana, released on 21 April 2017 as the lead single from their debut studio album Flow State (2018). The song peaked at number 59 on the ARIA Singles Chart and was certified gold in 2018.

== Charts ==
Chart performance for "Murder to the Mind"
Chart (2017)	Peak position
Australia (ARIA)	59

== Certification ==
Certifications for "Murder to the Mind"
Region	Certification	Certified units/sales
Australia (ARIA)	Gold	35,000^{‡}
^{‡} Sales+streaming figures based on certification alone.
