= Lost Friends =

Studio album by Middle Kids
- Released: 4 May 2018
- Genre: Alternative
- Label: Middle Kids / EMI / Universal / Domino
- Producer: Tim Fitz

Middle Kids chronology
| Middle Kids (2017) | Lost Friends (2018) | New Songs for Old Problems (2019) |

Singles from Lost Friends
- 1. "Mistake" Released: February 2018; 2. "On My Knees" Released: April 2018; 3. "Bought It" Released: April 2018; 4. "Don't Be Hiding" Released: June 2018

Lost Friends is the debut studio album by Australian alternative-indie rock band Middle Kids. It was released in May 2018 and peaked at number 10 on the ARIA Charts.

At the J Awards of 2018, it won Australian Album of the Year.

== Reception ==
Professional ratings
Aggregate scores
| Source | Rating |
|---|---|
| Metacritic | 70/100 |
Review scores
| Source | Rating |
| AllMusic | 3.5/5 stars |
| Clash | 7/10 |
| DIY | 3/5 stars |
| Dork | 4/5 stars |
| Drowned in Sound | 5/10 |
| The Line of Best Fit | 8.5/10 |
| Loud and Quiet | 7/10 |
| NME | 4/5 stars |
| Pitchfork | 6.8/10 |
| Under the Radar | 6/10 |

At Metacritic, which assigns a normalized rating out of 100 to reviews from mainstream publications, the album received a weighted average score of 70 based on 11 reviews, which indicates generally favorable reviews.

== Track listing ==
Lost Friends track listing
| No. | Title | Length |
|---|---|---|
| 1. | "Bought It" | 4:02 |
| 2. | "Mistake" | 3:32 |
| 3. | "Edge of Town" | 3:45 |
| 4. | "Maryland" | 3:38 |
| 5. | "On My Knees" | 3:34 |
| 6. | "Don't Be Hiding" | 3:04 |
| 7. | "Hole" | 1:30 |
| 8. | "Please" | 3:20 |
| 9. | "Lost Friends" | 3:25 |
| 10. | "Never Start" | 3:20 |
| 11. | "Tell Me Something" | 3:16 |
| 12. | "So Long Farewell I'm Gone" | 3:25 |
| Total length: | | 39:51 |

== Personnel ==
=== Musicians ===
Middle Kids

- Hannah Joy – writing, vocals, guitar, piano (1–12)
- Tim Fitz – bass, production (1–12)
- Harry Day – drums (1–12)

== Charts ==
Chart performance for Lost Friends
| Chart (2018) | Peak position |
|---|---|
| Australian Albums (ARIA) | 10 |

== Release history ==
| Region | Date | Format | Label | Catalogue |
|---|---|---|---|---|
| Various | 4 May 2018 | CD, digital download, streaming | Middle Kids / EMI Music / Universal Music Australia / Domino | 6730050 |
| Australia | 4 May 2018 | Limited Edition Purple Vinyl | EMI Music | 6730044 |
