= Flow State (Tash Sultana album) =

Studio album by Tash Sultana
- Released: 31 August 2018
- Studios: The Music Farm, Byron Bay, New South Wales, Australia; Woodstock Studios, Melbourne, Australia; Lonely Lands Studios, Melbourne, Australia
- Length: 61:00
- Labels: Lonely Lands; Sony Music Australia; Mom + Pop Music
- Producer: Tash Sultana

Tash Sultana chronology
Notion (2016)	Flow State (2018)	Terra Firma (2021)

Singles from Flow State
- 1. "Murder to the Mind" Released: 21 April 2017; 2. "Mystik" Released: 6 October 2017; 3. "Salvation" Released: 21 June 2018; 4. "Harvest Love" Released: 13 July 2018; 5. "Free Mind" Released: 17 August 2018

Flow State is the debut studio album by Australian singer-songwriter Tash Sultana, released on 31 August 2018, through their own record label, Lonely Lands Records (distributed by Sony Music Australia in Australia, and Mom + Pop elsewhere).

Sultana spent parts of 2017 and 2018 writing and recording the album, and was seen working with Matt Corby and Anderson .Paak throughout their album sessions. Melbourne audio engineer Nikita Miltiadou was pictured in recording session images, and was a previous engineer on Sultana's prior EP and singles.

At the ARIA Music Awards of 2018, Flow State won the ARIA Award for Best Blues and Roots Album.

At the J Awards of 2018, the album was nominated for Australian Album of the Year.

== Background and recording ==
Following the release of their extended play Notion in 2016, Sultana toured worldwide. In between tour dates, Sultana spent time in the studio to work on what was described to be their first album. In June 2017, in an interview with Fairfax, Sultana described their plans to release an album in April 2018.

While the timing was pushed back, due to several health issues, and touring delays, Sultana gradually released sneak peeks of the album recording process via their social media channels. Those snapshots featured footage and imagery of them in the studio. In 2017, Sultana released the two singles. "Murder to the Mind" and "Mystik". On 21 June 2018, Sultana premiered the song "Salvation" live on triple j Breakfast with Ben and Liam, and announced the forthcoming release of their first studio album, Flow State. They have subsequently released two further singles, "Harvest Love" and "Free Mind". In a Gold Coast Bulletin interview in August 2018, Sultana commented (regarding alcohol and other drugs in music) "you (I) hear all of the stories again and again and again (sic) from other musicians about alcohol and drugs and while it's fun to do for a bit, I don't know that is fun enough to try to sustain a life".

== Artwork and title ==
In an April 2018 interview with online Spanish blog Indierocks, Sultana spoke about the influence behind the name Flow State and said "it's the term to refer to when you access a part of your mind known as your being, and you find something you are passionate about."

In Sultana's social media, they make reference to Ben Lopez, and Pat Fox as being responsible for the creation of the art for the single "Salvation”, with Fox being responsible for the album art creation.

== Critical reception ==
Professional ratings
Aggregate scores
Source	Rating
Metacritic	76/100
Review scores
Source	Rating
AllMusic	3.5/5 stars
Beat Magazine	4.5/5 stars
Consequence of Sound	B+
The Guardian	3/5 stars
Herald Sun	4/5 stars
Rolling Stone	4/5 stars

At Metacritic, which assigns a normalised rating out of 100 to reviews from mainstream publications, the album received an average score of 76, based on 4 reviews, an indication of "generally favorable reviews". Ryan Bray of Consequence of Sound gave the album a B+, commenting "This is great pop music with an edge, a record full of good vibes and bad attitude, that somehow manages to work everything out splendidly." Maura Johnston of Rolling Stone awarded the album four of five stars, stating that "After years of being a festival and YouTube sensation, Sultana's thrown down the gauntlet forcefully." For Beat Magazine, Nathan Gunn rated the album 9/10 and commented "This record (Flow State) represents a quantum leap -- a major milestone in Sultana's seemingly short career. But don't underestimate her. This is just the beginning." Of Flow State, AllMusic's Mark Deming wrote "Sultana could stand to edit herself a bit better, but Flow State is unquestionably the work of a first-rate talent with potential, and if anyone is going to teach young women about the innate coolness of the guitar, she seems like just the person to do it.", giving the album 3.5 of 5 stars, or 70%. Mikey Cahill of the Herald Sun rated the album four of five stars, commenting "I thought she’d boxed herself in on the eager Jungle EP. Here she shows us she can go toe-to-toe with Hendrix, Erykah Badu, India. Arie and plenty more. She punches. She reigns."

In a more critical review, Rachel Aroesti of The Guardian awarded Flow State 3 of 5 stars, commenting "Lacking any particularly memorable melodies, it is expansive and mellow, recalling 90s singer-songwriter fare with added R&B flavours, spacey instrumentation and psychedelic guitar wigouts.".

== Release and promotion ==
On 21 June 2018, Sultana announced Flow State was available for pre-order, and was confirmed to be released on 31 August 2018.

The album was announced to be released through Sultana's own record label Lonely Lands Records, an imprint of Sony Music Australia, and through Mom+Pop Music in the US.

=== Singles ===
In 2017, Sultana released "Murder to the Mind" and "Mystik", which have both been certified gold in Australia in 2018. In June 2018, Sultana released the album's official lead single, "Salvation". On 13 July 2018, Sultana released the single "Harvest Love", followed by "Free Mind" on 17 August 2018.

=== Music videos ===
On 13 July, Sultana released a 'live lounge' recording of "Harvest Love". As of August 2018, the "Harvest Love" live lounge recording has over 300,000 views on YouTube.

Sultana released a lyric video for "Free Mind" on 17 August 2018. On 12 September 2018, Sultana released the official music video for "Free Mind" featuring footage from Sultana's tour and travelling, filmed and edited by Dara Munnis, and directed by Munnis and Sultana.

== Track listing ==
All tracks are written by Tash Sultana.

Flow State track listing
No.	Title	Length
1.	"Seed (Intro)"	2:36
2.	"Big Smoke"	3:58
3.	"Cigarettes"	5:22
4.	"Murder to the Mind"	4:16
5.	"Seven"	5:06
6.	"Salvation"	4:19
7.	"Pink Moon"	6:50
8.	"Mellow Marmalade"	3:52
9.	"Harvest Love"	6:05
10.	"Mystik"	4:08
11.	"Free Mind"	3:25
12.	"Blackbird"	9:34
13.	"Outro"	1:51
Total length:		61:00

== Personnel ==
Credits obtained from AllMusic.

- Tash Sultana – executive producer, composer, arranger, composer, primary artist
- Nikita Miltiadou – producer, engineer, mix assistant
- Dann Hume – mix engineer
- Andrei Eremin – mastering engineer
- Richard Stolz – engineer
- Ben Lopez – illustrator, painter
- Pat Fox – art director, graphic designer
- Dara Munnis – album photography

== Charts ==
Chart performance for Flow State
Chart (2018–2019)	Peak position
Australian Albums (ARIA)	2
Austrian Albums (Ö3 Austria)	43
Belgian Albums (Ultratop Flanders)	41
Belgian Albums (Ultratop Wallonia)	168
Canadian Albums (Billboard)	22
Dutch Albums (Album Top 100)	18
German Albums (Offizielle Top 100)	18
Irish Albums (IRMA)	67
New Zealand Albums (RMNZ)	12
Scottish Albums (Official Charts)	64
Spanish Albums (PROMUSICAE)	57
Swiss Albums (Schweizer Hitparade)	22
UK Albums (Official Charts)	67
US Billboard 200	51
US Top Alternative Albums (Billboard)	4
US Top Rock Albums (Billboard)	5

== Certifications ==
Region	Certification	Certified units/sales
Australia (ARIA)	Gold	35,000^{‡}
^{‡} Sales+streaming figures based on certification alone.

== Release history ==
Album formats and release dates
Region	Date	Format	Label
Australia	31 August 2018	Digital download; streaming; LP; CD	Lonely Lands Records/Sony Music Entertainment Australia
New Zealand	31 August 2018	Digital download; streaming; LP; CD	Lonely Lands Records/Sony Music Entertainment Australia
United States	31 August 2018	Digital download; streaming; LP; CD	Mom+Pop Music
United Kingdom	31 August 2018	Digital download; streaming; LP; CD	Columbia
