= Mystik =

Single by Tash Sultana

from the album Flow State
- Released: October 6, 2017
- Length: 4:09
- Label: Lonely Lands Records
- Songwriter: Tash Sultana
- Producers: Tash Sultana; Nikita Miltiadou

Tash Sultana singles chronology
"Murder to the Mind" (2017)	"Mystik" (2017)	"Salvation" (2018)

"Mystik" is a song by Australian alternative rock artist Tash Sultana, released on 6 October 2017 as the second single from their debut studio album, Flow State (2018). The song peaked at number 77 on the ARIA Singles Chart and was certified gold in 2018.

At the APRA Music Awards of 2019, the song was nominated for Blues & Roots Work of the Year.

== Background and release ==
Sultana told Triple J they wrote the song "..about the death of my ego, really. [I] Tried to just come back down and connect to myself and just be present, because when you're busy all the time you kind of get caught up in this whole mist and you forget to stop and be still and you get carried away thinking that you have to do all these things all the time when you probably just should be instead of do.

== Track listing ==
- Digital download
1. "Mystik" – 4:09

== Charts ==
=== Weekly charts ===
Chart (2017)	Peak position
Australia (ARIA)	77

== Certifications ==
Region	Certification	Certified units/sales
Australia (ARIA)	Platinum	70,000^{‡}
New Zealand (RMNZ)	Gold	15,000^{‡}
^{‡} Sales+streaming figures based on certification alone.
