= Hockey Dad =

Australian indie rock band

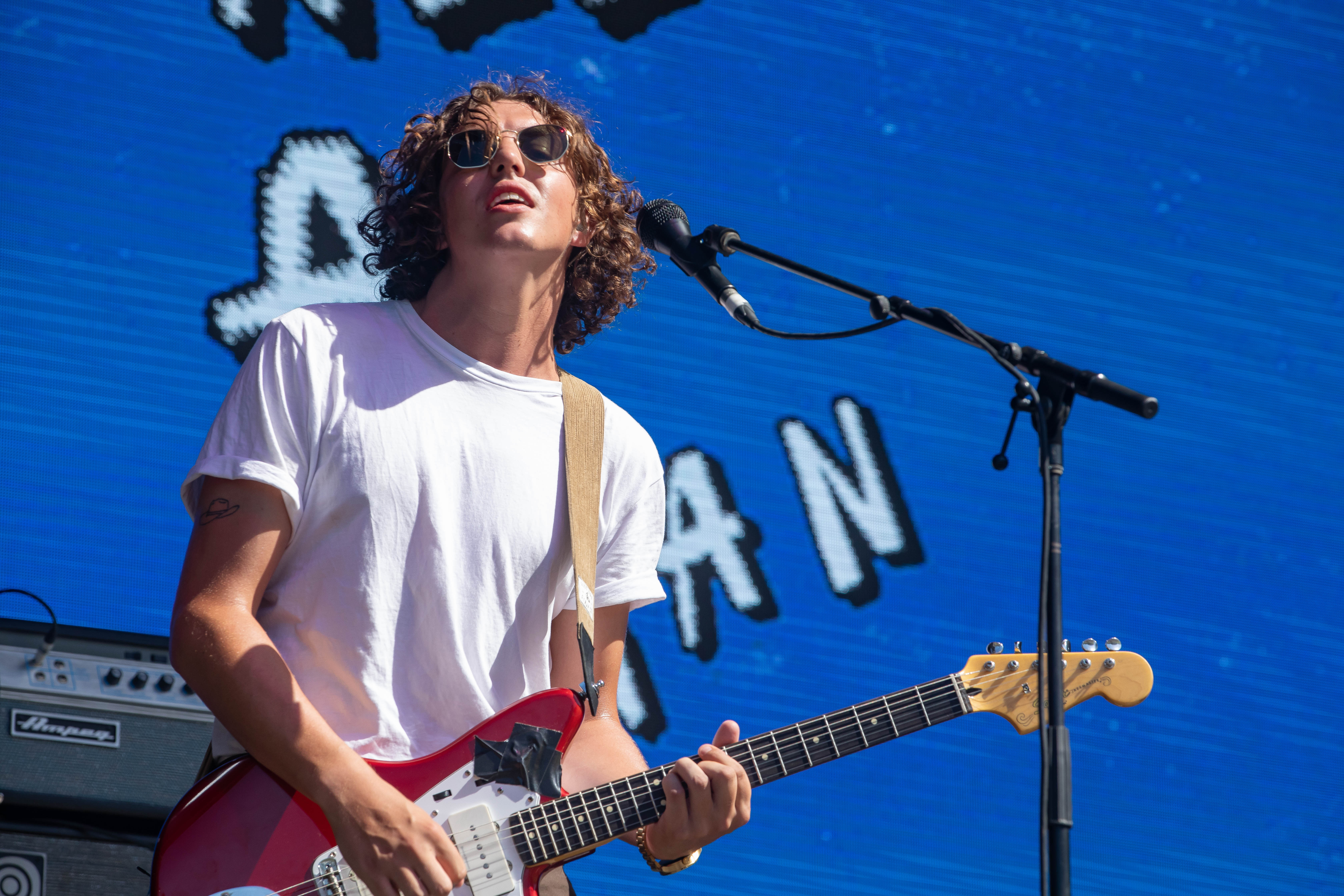
- Lead singer Zach Stephenson performing at Falls Festival in Byron Bay, 2018

Background information
- Origin: Windang, New South Wales, Australia
- Genres: Indie rock; surf rock; garage rock
- Years active: 2013–present
- Labels: Farmer and the Owl; Inertia Music; Kanine Records; LAB Records
- Members: Zach Stephenson; Billy Fleming
- Website: www.hockeydadband.com

Hockey Dad are an Australian indie rock duo from Windang, New South Wales, formed in 2013. The duo consists of lead vocalist and guitarist Zach Stephenson (born 15 November 1994) and drummer Billy Fleming (born 7 July 1996). The band's discography contains two extended plays, Dreamin' (2014) and The Clip (2025), and four studio albums, Boronia (2016), Blend Inn (2018), Brain Candy (2020), Rebuild Repeat (2024).

== History ==
Zach Stephenson and Billy Fleming, who both grew up on the same street in Windang, New South Wales, met in 1999 at the ages of three and four while playing football on the street. While in high school, they played in a band called Abstract Classic, before forming Hockey Dad in 2013. The name of the band derives from a video game shown in a 2003 episode of The Simpsons called "The Regina Monologues".

After releasing their debut extended play, Dreamin', in June 2014, the duo subsequently signed with the Wollongong-based independent label, Farmer and the Owl.

In 2026, Stephenson released his first solo album, I Needed To Hear Me Say It. He played his first solo shows at Bigsound and Yours and Owls Festival and released the supporting singles "In N Out" and "Broke My Jaw".

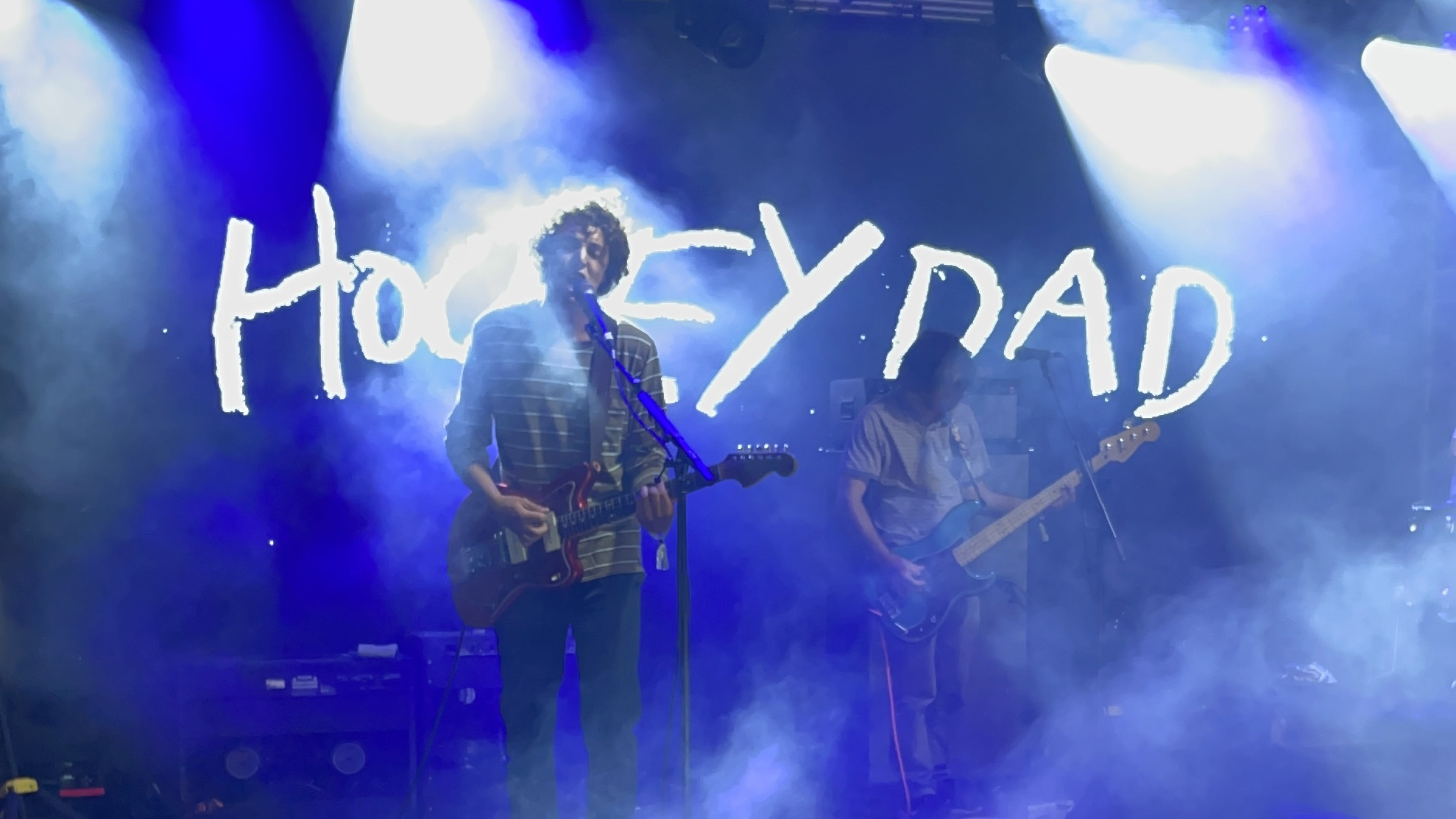
Hockey Dad performing in Geelong 2023

== Musical style and influences ==
Hockey Dad credits the era of 1960s garage as their main influence. The duo also credits their musical inspiration to bands such as Bass Drum of Death, Sparkadia and Band of Horses.

During a tour of the United States in support of their debut album Boronia, Fleming stated in an interview that his older brother’s collection of 1990s punk music significantly influenced his musical style. In contrast, Stephenson cited his father’s collection of 1980s Australian punk and rock music as a major source of inspiration.

== Band members ==
Current members

- Zach Stephenson – lead vocals, guitar, bass
- Billy Fleming – drums, percussion, backing and occasional lead vocals

Current touring musicians

- Steve Bourke – bass, backing vocals

Former touring musicians

- Stu McKenzie – drums (substitute for Billy Fleming)

== Tours ==
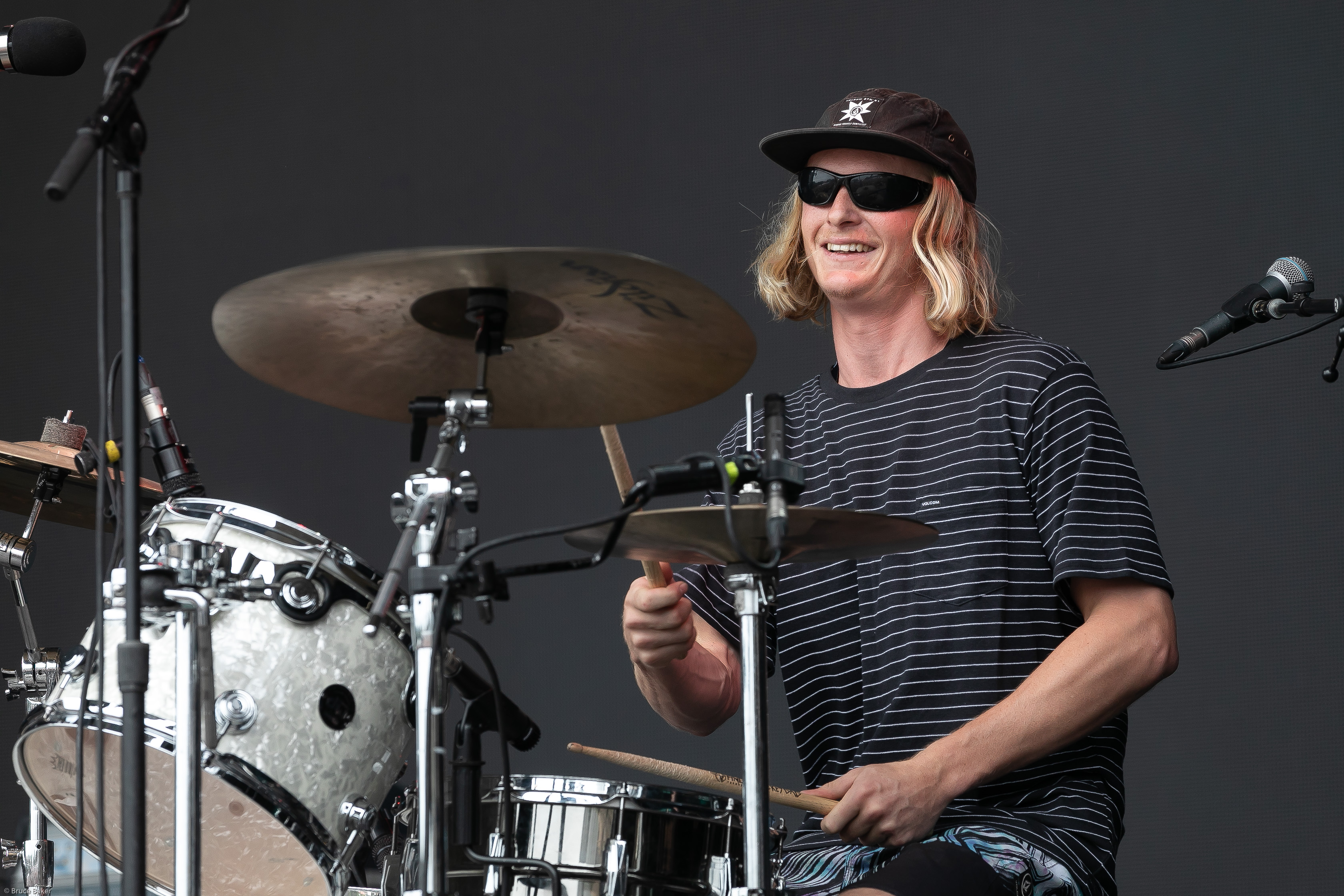
Drummer Billy Fleming at Laneway Festival in 2020

=== Nationwide ===
- Boronia Tour – 2016
- Benefit of the Doubt Tour – 2017
- Join the Club Tour – 2018
- Alive at the Drive-In – 2020
- Brain Candy Tour – 2022
- Hockey Fields Tour (co-headlining with Ruby Fields) – 2023
- Rebuild Repeat Australian Tour – 2024

=== International ===
- North America tour (US & Canada) – 2017
- Blend Inn Tour (Australia & New Zealand) – 2018
- North American Tour – 2024

== Discography ==
=== Studio albums ===
List of studio albums, with selected chart positions
Title	Details	Peak chart positions
Title	Details	AUS
Boronia	Released: 12 August 2016; Label: Kanine, Farmer & the Owl; Formats: CD, digital download, streaming	55
Blend Inn	Released: 9 February 2018; Label: Kanine, Farmer & the Owl; Formats: CD, digital download, streaming	6
Brain Candy	Released: 31 July 2020; Label: Kanine, Farmer & the Owl; Formats: CD, digital download, streaming	2
Rebuild Repeat	Released: 14 June 2024; Label: Farmer & the Owl; Formats: Digital download, streaming	15

=== Live albums ===
List of live albums, with selected chart positions
Title	Details	Peak chart positions
Title	Details	AUS
Live at the Drive In	Released: 5 November 2021; Label: Farmer & the Owl, BMG; Formats: LP, digital download, streaming	22

=== EPs ===
List of EPs
Title	Details
Dreamin'	Released: 24 June 2014; Label: Kanine, Farmer & the Owl; Formats: CD, digital download
The Clip	Released: 12 September 2025; Label: Hockey Dad; Format: digital download

=== Singles ===
List of singles, with year released, chart positions, album name and music video director shown
Title	Year	Chart positions	Certification	Album	Music video director
Title	Year	Triple J Hottest 100	Certification	Album	Music video director
"Lull City"	2013	—		Dreamin'	Stephen Bourke
"I Need a Woman"	2014	—		Dreamin'	Brett Randall
"Seaweed"	2014	—	RMNZ: Gold	Dreamin'	William Fleming
"Can't Have Them"	2015	—		Boronia	Dave Fox
"So Tired"	2016	—		Boronia	Dave Fox
"Jump the Gun"	2016	—		Boronia	William Fleming
"A Night Out With"	2016	— (Note: "A Night Out With" did not enter the 2016 Hottest 100, but did chart at number 184 in the Hottest 200.)		Boronia	Laban Pheidias
"Homely Feeling"	2017	54		Blend Inn	David Wayland & William Fleming
"I Wanna Be Everybody"	2018	61		Blend Inn	Tom Healy
"Join the Club"	2018	18		Blend Inn	William Fleming
"I Missed Out"	2019	60		Brain Candy	William Fleming
"Itch"	2020	99		Brain Candy	Laban Pheidias
"In This State"	2020	— (Note: "In This State" did not enter the 2020 Hottest 100, but did chart at number 141 in the Hottest 200.)		Brain Candy	—N/a
"Good Eye"	2020	— (Note: "Good Eye" did not enter the 2020 Hottest 100, but did chart at number 123 in the Hottest 200.)		Brain Candy	Ken Weston & Luke Player
"Germaphobe"	2020	96		Brain Candy	William Fleming
"T's to Cross"	2022	— (Note: "T's to Cross" did not enter the 2022 Hottest 100, but did chart at number 147 in the Hottest 200.)		Non-album single	Zach Stephenson & Billy Fleming
"Still Have Room"	2023	45		Rebuild Repeat	Jamieson Kerr
"Base Camp"	2024	— (Note: "Base Camp" did not enter the 2024 Hottest 100, but did chart at number 116 in the Hottest 200.)		Rebuild Repeat	Jamieson Kerr
"Safety Pin"	2024	— (Note: "Safety Pin" did not enter the 2024 Hottest 100, but did chart at number 119 in the Hottest 200.)		Rebuild Repeat	Jamieson Kerr
"All Hat, No Cattle"	2025	TBA		The Clip	James Kates
"Barn Boiler"	2025	TBA		The Clip	William Fleming

== Awards and nominations ==
=== APRA Awards ===
The APRA Awards are several award ceremonies run in Australia by the Australasian Performing Right Association (APRA) to recognise composing and song writing skills, sales and airplay performance by its members annually.

Year	Nominee / work	Award	Result
2021	"I Missed Out"	Most Performed Rock Work	Nominated

=== J Award ===
The J Awards are an annual series of Australian music awards that were established by the Australian Broadcasting Corporation's youth-focused radio station Triple J. They commenced in 2005.

Year	Nominee / work	Award	Result
J Awards of 2018	Blend Inn	Australian Album of the Year	Nominated

=== National Live Music Awards ===
The National Live Music Awards (NLMAs) are a broad recognition of Australia's diverse live industry, celebrating the success of the Australian live scene. The awards commenced in 2016.

Year	Nominee / work	Award	Result
National Live Music Awards of 2018	Hockey Dad	Best Live Act of the Year - People's Choice	Nominated

=== Rolling Stone Australia Awards ===
The Rolling Stone Australia Awards are awarded annually in January or February by the Australian edition of Rolling Stone magazine for outstanding contributions to popular culture in the previous year.

Year	Nominee / work	Award	Result	Ref.
2021	Brain Candy	Best Record	Nominated	
