= Terra Firma (Tash Sultana album) =

Studio album by Tash Sultana
- Released: 19 February 2021
- Length: 60:06
- Labels: Lonely Lands; Sony Music Australia
- Producer: Tash Sultana

Tash Sultana chronology
Flow State (2018)	Terra Firma (2021)	Sugar EP (2023)

Singles from Terra Firma
- 1. "Pretty Lady" Released: 9 April 2020; 2. "Greed" Released: 20 June 2020; 3. "Beyond the Pine" Released: 10 September 2020; 4. "Willow Tree" Released: 29 October 2020; 5. "Sweet & Dandy" Released: 22 January 2021

Terra Firma is the second studio album by Australian singer-songwriter, Tash Sultana. The album was released on 19 February 2021, through their own record label, Lonely Lands Records (distributed by Sony Music Australia in Australia).

The album's release date was announced on 29 October 2020, alongside the fourth single, "Willow Tree". Sultana said about the album "I didn't realise that I needed to create a space and home for myself to feel like a person again. I just went inward and found a really peaceful place and wrote an album, and I feel really happy with it."

At the 2021 ARIA Music Awards, the album was nominated for Best Soul/R&B Release.

== Background and recording ==
For the first time, Sultana opened themself up to collaborators, starting with a 10-day writing session with Matt Corby and Dann Hume, with Sultana saying "Matt was very helpful for me at the beginning of this process, because I was experiencing writers block."

== Release ==
On 9 April 2020, Sultana released the first single from the album, Pretty Lady. The single features Matt Corby and Dann Hume, and was recorded in Tash's home studio. Sultana premiered the song to Triple J's breakfast program on the same day.

The second single "Greed" was released on 20 June 2020.

The third single "Beyond the Pine" was released on 10 September 2020. Sultana explained the title: "Beyond The Pine is about finding solace in nature and realizing the depth of your relationship when you find your one. Love is yours no matter the colour, race, gender, religion, sexuality or identity.

On 29 October 2020, Sultana released the fourth single "Willow Tree", and features Australian rapper Jerome Farah.

The fifth single "Sweet & Dandy" was released on 22 January 2021. Sultana said in an interview: "Sweet and Dandy is about the process of withdrawing yourself from negative distractions and living in the present, always remembering that you are enough. You and you alone, you do not need the world to tell you to be a certain way."

== Critical reception ==
Professional ratings
Aggregate scores
Source	Rating
AnyDecentMusic?	7.1/10
Metacritic	74/100
Review scores
Source	Rating
AllMusic	3.5/5 stars
Clash	8/10
The Line of Best Fit	7/10

Terra Firma was met with "generally favorable" reviews from critics. At Metacritic, which assigns a weighted average rating out of 100 to reviews from mainstream publications, this release received an average score of 74 based on 5 reviews. AnyDecentMusic? gave the release a 7.1 out of 10 based on a critical consensus of 6 reviews.

In a review for AllMusic, Mark Deming stated: "Terra Firma is mostly rooted in laid-back, gentle grooves, with more room for personal introspection and ruminations on relationships and one's place in the larger world. Sultana's vocals have gained some range and nuance since their first album, and there's a welcome sense of the artist embracing the joys of pushing the boundaries; the guitar work here is very fine but not flashy, and shares the stage with keyboards and other flavors that give the tracks a rich and varied sound. Gemma Ross of Clash said: "Terra Firma offers a much more nuanced and settled approach to Tash's ridiculously enormous musical palette, where their first album acted as a mismatch of a not-quite-yet figured out style. Easy listening, bubbly, psych-pop-cum-soul-cum-funk and perhaps every other genre you could conjure up, Tash Sultana has come a long way from Flow State.

== Track listing ==
Terra Firma track listing
No.	Title	Writer(s)	Length
1.	"Musk"	Tash Sultana	4:16
2.	"Crop Circles"	Sultana; Matt Corby; Dann Hume	3:35
3.	"Greed"	Sultana; Corby; Hume	3:42
4.	"Beyond the Pine"	Sultana; Corby; Hume	3:56
5.	"Pretty Lady"	Sultana; Corby; Hume	4:39
6.	"Dream My Life Away" (featuring Josh Cashman)	Sultana; Josh Cashman	5:15
7.	"Maybe You've Changed"	Sultana	5:22
8.	"Coma"	Sultana	5:32
9.	"Blame It on Society"	Sultana	4:58
10.	"Sweet & Dandy"	Sultana	4:17
11.	"Willow Tree" (featuring Jerome Farah)	Sultana; Jerome Farah	3:19
12.	"Vanilla Honey"	Sultana	4:40
13.	"Let the Light In"	Sultana	3:00
14.	"I Am Free"	Sultana	3:35
Total length:			60:06

== Personnel ==
- Tash Sultana – arrangement, acoustic guitar, bass, beats, drums, electric guitar, flute, keyboards, lap steel guitar, mandolin, pan flute, percussion, piano, saxophone, synthesizer, trombone, trumpet, production, engineering, creative direction
- Dann Hume – mixing
- Andrei Eremin – mastering
- Richard Stolz – engineering
- Pat Fox – creative direction, artwork, layout

== Charts ==
=== Weekly charts ===
Chart performance for Terra Firma
Chart (2021)	Peak position
Australian Albums (ARIA)	1
Belgian Albums (Ultratop Flanders)	131
Dutch Albums (Album Top 100)	38
German Albums (Offizielle Top 100)	7
New Zealand Albums (RMNZ)	16
Scottish Albums (Official Charts)	44
Swiss Albums (Schweizer Hitparade)	3

=== Year-end charts ===
Chart (2021)	Position
Australian Artist Albums (ARIA)	38
