= Jungle (Tash Sultana song) =

Single by Tash Sultana

from the album Notion
- Released: 5 September 2016
- Label: Lonely Lands
- Songwriter: Tash Sultana

Tash Sultana singles chronology
"Notion" (2016)	"Jungle" (2016)	"Murder to the Mind" (2017)

"Jungle" is a song by Australian alternative rock artist Tash Sultana, released on 5 September 2016 as the third and final single from Sultana's extended play Notion (2016). The song peaked at number 39 on the ARIA Singles Chart, being the artist's first top 50 single.

On 26 January 2017, the song placed number three on the Triple J Hottest 100, 2016, the third highest-placed song by an Australian artist.

== Track listing ==
- Digital download
1. "Jungle" – 5:16
- Digital download
1. "Jungle" (radio edit) – 3:56

== Charts ==
=== Weekly charts ===
Chart (2016–18)	Peak position
Australia (ARIA)	39
US Alternative (Billboard)	39

=== Year-end charts ===
Chart (2017)	Position
Australian Artist Singles (ARIA)	21

== Certification ==
Region	Certification	Certified units/sales
Australia (ARIA)	3× Platinum	210,000^{‡}
New Zealand (RMNZ)	4× Platinum	120,000^{‡}
^{‡} Sales+streaming figures based on certification alone.
