= Talk It Out (song) =

Single by Matt Corby and Tash Sultana
- Released: 10 July 2019
- Length: 3:10
- Label: Universal Music Australia
- Songwriters: Matt Corby, Dann Hume
- Producer: Dann Hume

Matt Corby and Tash Sultana singles chronology
"Miracle Love" (2019)	"Talk It Out" (2019)	"So Easy" (2019)

Tash Sultana singles chronology
"Can't Buy Happiness" (2019)	"Talk it Out" (2019)	"Daydreaming" (2019)

Music video
- "Talk It Out" on YouTube

"Talk It Out" is a collaborative song by Australian musicians Matt Corby and Tash Sultana and released in July 2019. The song was certified gold in Australia in 2020.

== Background and release ==
In January 2017, a social media post showed, Matt Corby and Tash Sultana working on music together.

"Talk It Out" was originally written during sessions for Corby's 2018 album, Rainbow Valley, ultimately not making the final track listing, with Corby later saying "It didn't feel like it was a fit for the record" Corby said "The song was built in parts over time". Corby further developed the track before sending it to Sultana. Corby said "I felt as though the grooves would be right up her alley, our voices have similar timbre as well. It seemed like a really good fit to me, I'm just stoked that she said yes to be honest."

About the song, Sultana said "I was shocked he didn't put it on the album and really, really stoked he thought I would be able to fill in the spaces. It was actually quite easy."

The track was released on 10 July 2019

== Music video ==
The Andrew Onorato directed video was released on 14 August 2019.

== Reception ==
Al Newstead from Triple J said "'Talk It Out' combines the powers of Matt Corby and Tash Sultana together for a blissful duet scoring 'a breakdown in communication'."

Tyler Jenke of Tone Deaf said "'Talk It Out' is the dreamy collaboration that fans have been waiting for. With blissed out guitar lines, a hazy atmosphere and some dazzling interplay between the pair's vocals, it's a testament to what both artists are capable of."

Kelly McCafferty Dorogy from Atwood Magazine called the single "effervescent" saying "The collaboration of the artists creates a sound unique to them. It's like striking gold when the musicality of a song makes you want to do what the lyrics are telling you to do so precisely. Corby and Sultana execute this perfectly."

== Charts ==
Chart performance for "Talk It Out"
Chart (2020)	Peak position
New Zealand Hot Singles (RMNZ)	13

== Certifications ==
Certifications for "Talk It Out"
Region	Certification	Certified units/sales
Australia (ARIA)	Platinum	70,000^{‡}
New Zealand (RMNZ)	Gold	15,000^{‡}
^{‡} Sales+streaming figures based on certification alone.
