= Blend Inn =

Studio album by Hockey Dad
- Released: 9 February 2018
- Studio: Robert Lang (Shoreline, Washington)
- Length: 40:09
- Label: Farmer & The Owl, LAB
- Producer: John Goodmanson

Hockey Dad chronology
| Boronia (2016) | Blend Inn (2018) | Brain Candy (2020) |

Singles from Blend Inn
- 1. "Homely Feeling" Released: 20 October 2017; 2. "I Wanna Be Everybody" Released: 19 January 2018; 3. "Join the Club" Released: 12 June 2018

Professional ratings
Review scores
| Source | Rating |
|---|---|
| AllMusic | 3.5/5 stars |
| TheMusic | 3/5 stars |
| Sputnikmusic | 3/5 stars |

Blend Inn is the second studio album from Australian post punk duo Hockey Dad. The album was released on 9 February 2018 by Farmer & The Owl. In 2018, the lead single "Homely Feeling" was voted into Triple J's Hottest 100 of 2017 at No. 54. This marked the first time the band has appeared in the countdown. In 2019, the tracks "Join the Club", "Sweet Release" and "I Wanna Be Everybody" were voted into Triple J's Hottest 100 of 2018 at Nos. 18, 73 and 61, respectively.

At the J Awards of 2018, the album was nominated for Australian Album of the Year.

== Recording ==
After a successful run of shows throughout 2016, Hockey Dad flew to Seattle to record Blend Inn with producer John Goodmanson at the Robert Lang Studios. According to drummer William "Billy" Fleming, the album title refers to "the part of your head that you want to go to when you're overseas and wishing you were back home, it's within. We're always just trying to be comfortable and semi blending in, so it's the name we gave to that place you zone out to." The album artwork depicts a photo of the studio where the band recorded the album. The photo was taken by Fleming.

== Track listing ==
All music is composed by Zach Stephenson and William Fleming.

| No. | Title | Length |
|---|---|---|
| 1. | "My Stride" | 3:41 |
| 2. | "Homely Feeling" | 2:20 |
| 3. | "I Wanna Be Everybody" | 3:38 |
| 4. | "Danny" | 3:31 |
| 5. | "Join the Club" | 3:17 |
| 6. | "Whatever" | 2:26 |
| 7. | "Disappoint Me" | 3:15 |
| 8. | "Running Out" | 4:15 |
| 9. | "Stalker" | 3:05 |
| 10. | "Where I Came From" | 3:41 |
| 11. | "Sweet Release" | 3:27 |
| 12. | "Eggshells" | 3:33 |
| Total length: | | 40:09 |

== Personnel ==
=== Musicians ===
Hockey Dad

- Zach Stephenson – guitar, lead vocals (1–12), backing vocals (11)
- William Fleming – drums (1–12), lead vocals (11)

Additional musicians

- Stephen Bourke – bass guitar (1–12)

=== Technical ===
- John Goodmanson – production (1–12)

== Charts ==
| Chart (2018) | Peak position |
|---|---|
| Australian Albums (ARIA) | 6 |
| New Zealand Heatseeker Albums (RMNZ) | 5 |
