= Notion (Tash Sultana song) =

Single by Tash Sultana

from the album Notion
- Released: June 17, 2016
- Genre: Psychedelic rock
- Label: Lonely Lands Records
- Songwriter: Tash Sultana

Tash Sultana singles chronology
"Gemini" (2016)	"Notion" (2016)	"Jungle" (2016)

"Notion" is a song by Australian alternative rock artist Tash Sultana, released on 17 June 2016 as the second single from Sultana's extended play Notion (2016). The song was certified platinum in Australia in 2018.

== Track listing ==
- Digital download
1. "Notion" – 5:41
- Digital download
1. "Notion" (radio edit) – 4:08

== Certifications ==
Region	Certification	Certified units/sales
Australia (ARIA)	2× Platinum	140,000^{‡}
New Zealand (RMNZ)	2× Platinum	60,000^{‡}
^{‡} Sales+streaming figures based on certification alone.
