= Brain Candy (album) =

Studio album by Hockey Dad
- Released: 31 July 2020
- Studio: Robert Lang (Shoreline, Washington); Western Australia
- Genre: Rock
- Length: 45:06
- Label: Farmer & The Owl, BMG
- Producer: John Goodmanson

Hockey Dad chronology
Blend Inn (2018)	Brain Candy (2020)	Live at the Drive In (2021)

Singles from Brain Candy
- 1. "I Missed Out" Released: 15 November 2019; 2. "Itch" Released: 14 February 2020; 3. "In This State" Released: 17 April 2020; 4. "Good Eye" Released: 11 June 2020; 5. "Germaphobe" Released: 31 July 2020

Brain Candy is the third studio album from Australian indie rock duo, Hockey Dad. The album was released on 31 July 2020 by Farmer & The Owl and debuted at number 2 on the ARIA Albums Chart. The album was nominated for Best Album at the 2021 Rolling Stone Australia Awards.

== Reception ==
Professional ratings
Review scores
Source	Rating
AllMusic	4/5 stars
NME	4/5 stars

Mark Deming form AllMusic said "[Hockey Dad] have gained a bit in the way of chops over the space of four years, and they certainly know their way around the studio better; the guitar, bass, and keyboard overdubs give the album a fuller and more satisfying sound without squeezing the spontaneity out of the tracks, and the melodies possess a bit more complexity, adding additional layers that make the results sound a touch more grown up than before." Deming concluded saying "Brain Candy isn't kid's stuff, but rather the word of two guys determined to make adulthood work for them without spoiling everything, and Hockey Dad hit that target with flying colours."

Ali Shutler from NME said the album is "A departure from their scrappy origins, this record is a big, grown-up collection of forward-thinking rock gems. Sure, it might not be as chaotic or feel as grimy as what's come before, but it's a deliberately larger-than-life affair. With Brain Candy, all bets are off: Broader, more colourful and with a lot more to say, it shows Hockey Dad are ready to take on the world."

== Track listing ==
All music is composed by Zach Stephenson and William Fleming.

Brain Candy track listing
No.	Title	Length
1.	"In This State"	3:02
2.	"I Missed Out"	3:33
3.	"Milk in the Sun"	2:59
4.	"Good Eye"	3:54
5.	"Germaphobe"	3:24
6.	"Itch"	4:54
7.	"Heavy Assault"	2:45
8.	"Nestle Down"	3:37
9.	"Tell Me What You Want"	3:11
10.	"Dole Brother"	2:45
11.	"Keg"	3:13
12.	"Reno"	3:50
13.	"Looking Forward to the Change"	4:19
Total length:		45:06

== Personnel ==
=== Musicians ===
Hockey Dad

- Zach Stephenson – vocals, guitar
- Billy Fleming – drums

=== Technical ===
- John Goodmanson – production

== Charts ==
Chart performance for Brain Candy
Chart (2020)	Peak position
Australian Albums (ARIA)	2
