= Middle Kids =

Australian indie rock band

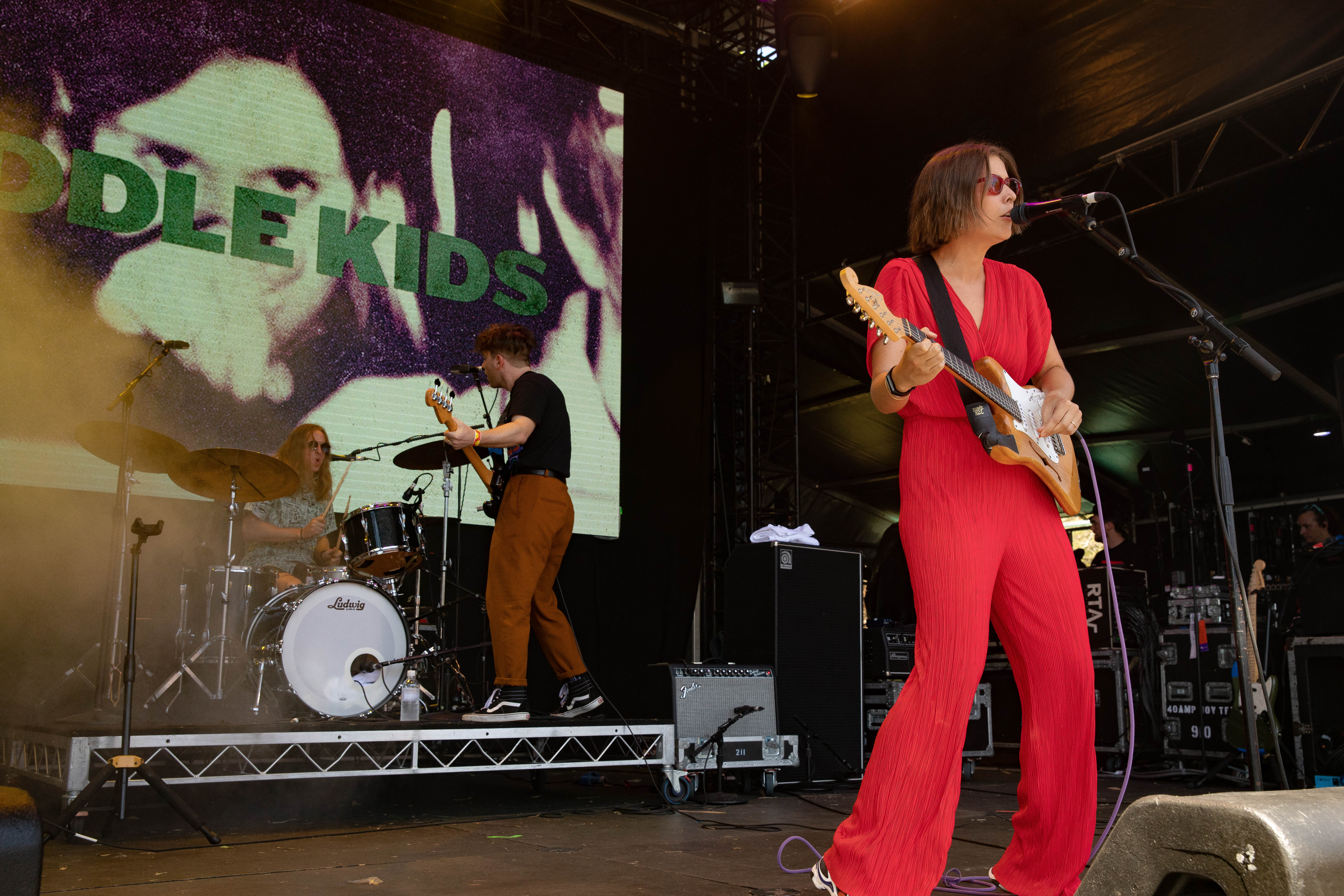
- Middle Kids performing at St Jerome's Laneway Festival, 2019

Background information
- Origin: Sydney, New South Wales, Australia
- Years active: 2016–present
- Labels: Universal; Domino; EMI
- Members: Hannah Joy; Tim Fitz; Harry Day
- Website: middlekidsmusic.com

Middle Kids are an Australian alternative indie rock band from Sydney. The group consists of lead vocalist and guitarist Hannah Joy (real name Hannah Joy Cameron), multi-instrumentalist Tim Fitz (real name Timothy Fitzmaurice) and drummer Harry Day. Since forming in 2016, the band has released their eponymous debut EP (2017), the album Lost Friends (2018), the New Songs for Old Problems EP (2019), and their second studio album, Today We're the Greatest (2021). In February 2024, they released their third album, Faith Crisis Pt 1.

== Career ==
=== 2016–2017: Formation and debut EP ===
Middle Kids originally formed after Fitz offered to produce some songs for Joy's solo project after attending a show she played. Prior to Middle Kids, Fitz was also a solo artist; he released five EPs between 2011 and 2014 under his own name. They enlisted local jazz drummer Harry Day (who went to school with Joy) for a recording session, in which they recorded their debut single, "Edge of Town".

The song's radio premiere on Triple J in May 2016 was followed by a feature in Rolling Stone. Shortly after the video clip's premiere on Stereogum, the song was added to Elton John's Beats 1 show. The trio won FBi Radio's Northern Lights competition (which sent them to perform in Reykjavík, Iceland at the Iceland Airwaves music festival).

The band recorded and released their debut self-titled EP in February 2017. They also toured with Paul Kelly and Steve Earle in November of that year.

=== 2018–2019: Lost Friends ===
In May 2018, the band released their debut album, Lost Friends. It was primarily recorded in their Sydney home, produced by band member Tim Fitz, and mixed by Peter Katis.

It debuted at number 10 on the ARIA Charts. A Pitchfork review described the sound as "radiant, anthemic indie rock, balancing doubt-ridden lyrics with clear-eyed execution". Lost Friends was nominated for the ARIA Award for Best Rock Album at the ARIA Music Awards of 2016. It won the prestigious J Award for Australian Album of the Year. The lead single "Mistake" was voted into the 2018 Triple J Hottest 100.

Middle Kids played their USA TV debut on Conan. Additionally they have performed on Jimmy Kimmel Live!, The Late Late Show with James Corden and Busy Tonight. They have played live sessions for KCRW, KEXP, KTBG, WFUV, and Triple J (in which they performed a cover of "Don't Dream It's Over" by Crowded House for Like a Version).

The band have toured extensively in the US, performing at South by Southwest, Lollapalooza, Governors Ball Music Festival, LouFest, Firefly Music Festival, Austin City Limits Fest among others. They also opened on tours for the War on Drugs, Ryan Adams, Cold War Kids, Local Natives.

The band supported Bloc Party on a European tour in 2018 and played a live session in the UK at the BBC Maida Vale Studios.

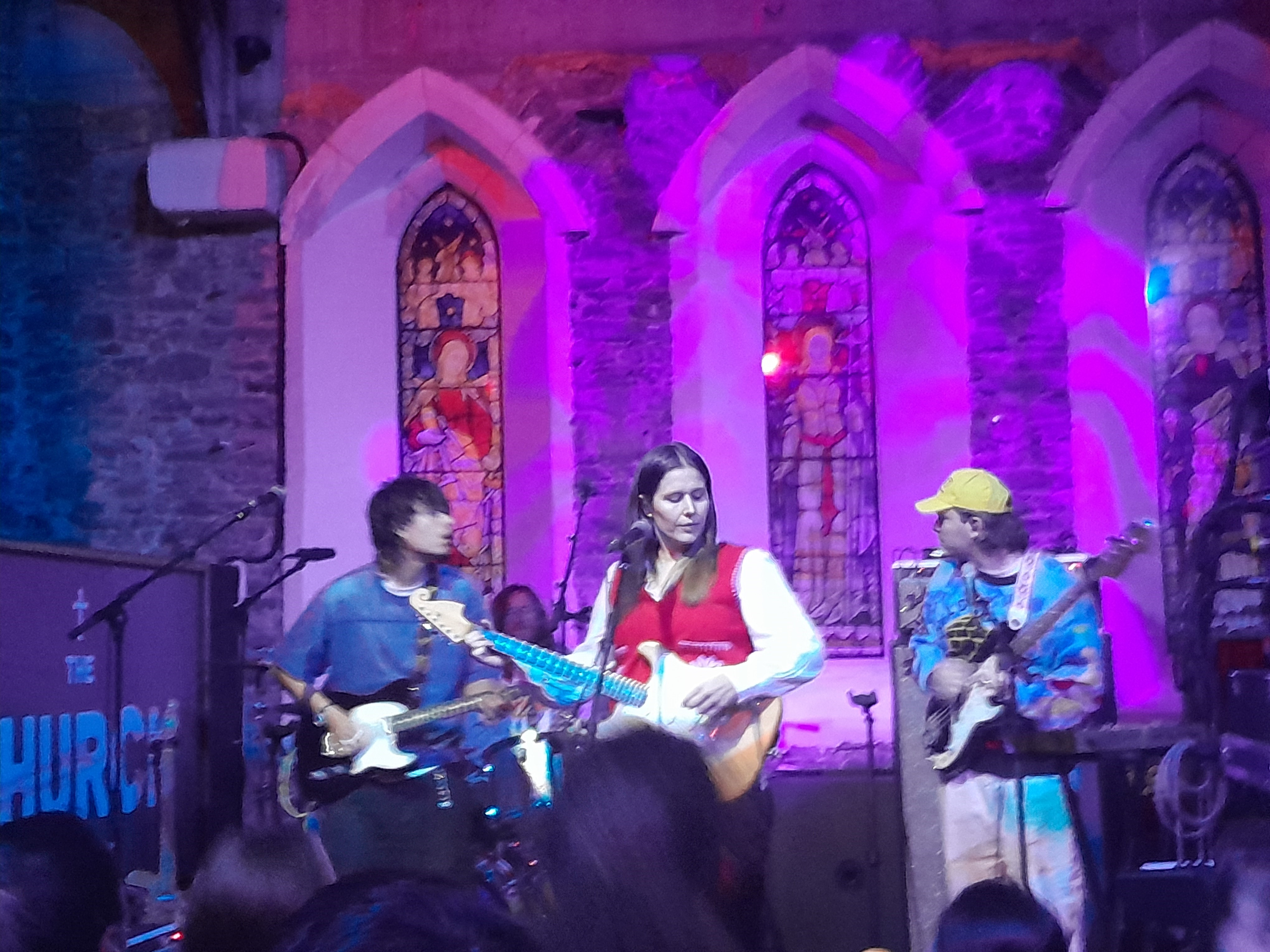
Middle Kids performing in Christchurch, New Zealand (September 2024)

The band released the EP New Songs for Old Problems in May 2019. These were released by Domino in the US, EMI Records in Australia, and Lucky Number in the UK.

=== 2020–2022: Today We're the Greatest ===
In October 2020, Middle Kids released their first new song in 18 months, the lead single "R U 4 Me?". A second single, "Questions", was issued in January alongside the announcement that their second studio album, Today We're the Greatest, would release on 19 March 2021. The record was supported by three more singles and an Australian tour beginning in May 2021.

The band returned to the Triple J studio in May 2021 to perform their second Like a Version, a cover of Olivia Rodrigo's 2021 single "Drivers License".

=== 2023: Faith Crisis Pt 1 ===
In June 2022, Middle Kids spent five weeks in Bournemouth, United Kingdom to record their third album with producer Jonathan Gilmore. In June 2023, they released the lead single "Bootleg Firecracker", their first new track since 2021. It was followed by "Highlands", issued in July. In February 2024, Middle Kids released their third studio album, Faith Crisis Pt 1.

In 2025, the group contributed "Cause = Time" to the Anthems: A Celebration of Broken Social Scene's You Forgot It in People album.

In November 2026, the group released "Big Freak".

== Discography ==
=== Studio albums ===
List of studio albums, with release date, label, and selected chart positions shown
Title	Album details	Peak chart positions	
Title	Album details	AUS	SCO
Lost Friends	Released: 4 May 2018; Label: Middle Kids (independent), Universal Music Australia, Domino; Formats: CD, LP, digital download, streaming	10	—
Today We're the Greatest	Released: 19 March 2021; Label: EMI; Formats: CD, LP, digital download, streaming	5	87
Faith Crisis Pt 1	Released: 16 February 2024; Label: EMI; Formats: CD, LP, digital download, streaming	20	—
"—" denotes a recording that did not chart or was not released.

=== Extended plays ===
List of EPs, with release date, label, and selected chart positions shown
Title	EP details	Peak chart positions
Title	EP details	AUS
Middle Kids	Released: 17 February 2017; Label: Middle Kids, Universal Music Australia; Formats: CD, LP, digital download, streaming	26
New Songs for Old Problems	Released: 24 May 2019; Label: Middle Kids, EMI; Formats: CD, LP, digital download, streaming	44

=== Singles ===
List of singles, with year released, selected certifications and album name shown
Title	Year	Peak chart positions	Certifications	Album
Title	Year	US AAA	Certifications	Album
"Edge of Town"	2016	—	ARIA: Platinum	Middle Kids
"Never Start"	2017	—	ARIA: Gold	Middle Kids
"Old River"	2017	—		Middle Kids
"Mistake"	2018	—	ARIA: Gold	Lost Friends
"On My Knees"	2018	—		Lost Friends
"Bought It"	2018	—		Lost Friends
"Don't Be Hiding"	2018	—		Lost Friends
"Real Thing"	2019	—		New Songs for Old Problems
"R U 4 Me?"	2020	36		Today We're the Greatest
"Questions"	2021	35		Today We're the Greatest
"Cellophane (Brain)"	2021	—		Today We're the Greatest
"Stacking Chairs"	2021	—	ARIA: Gold	Today We're the Greatest
"Today We're the Greatest"	2021	—		Today We're the Greatest
"Drivers License" (Triple J Like a Version)	2022	—		Non-album single
"Bootleg Firecracker"	2023	—		Faith Crisis Pt 1
"Highlands"	2023	36		Faith Crisis Pt 1
"Dramamine"	2023	27		Faith Crisis Pt 1
"Driving Home for Christmas"	2023	—		Non-album single
"Bend"	2023	—		Faith Crisis Pt 1
"Terrible News"	2024	—		Faith Crisis Pt 1
"Cause = Time"	2025	—		Anthems: A Celebration of Broken Social Scene's You Forgot It in People
"Big Freak"	2026	—		
"—" denotes a recording that did not chart or was not released.

== Awards and nominations ==
=== APRA Music Awards ===
The APRA Music Awards were established by Australasian Performing Right Association (APRA) in 1982 to honour the achievements of songwriters and music composers, and to recognise their song writing skills, sales and airplay performance, by its members annually.

Year	Nominee / work	Award	Result	Ref.
2025	"Dramamine" (Hannah Cameron and Timothy Fitzmaurice)	Song of the Year	Shortlisted	

=== ARIA Music Awards ===
The ARIA Music Awards is an annual awards ceremony that recognises excellence, innovation, and achievement across all genres of Australian music.

Year	Nominee / work	Award	Result	Ref.
2018	Lost Friends	Best Rock Album	Nominated	
2021	Today We're the Greatest	Best Rock Album	Won	
2024	Faith Crisis Pt 1	Best Rock Album	Nominated	

=== J Awards ===
The J Awards are an annual series of Australian music awards that were established by the Australian Broadcasting Corporation's youth-focused radio station Triple J.

Year	Nominee / work	Award	Result	Ref.
2018	Lost Friends	Australian Album of the Year	Won	
2021	Today We're the Greatest	Australian Album of the Year	Nominated	
2023	"Bootleg Firecracker"	Australian Video of the Year	Nominated	
2024	Faith Crisis Pt 1	Australian Album of the Year	Nominated	

=== National Live Music Awards ===
The National Live Music Awards (NLMAs) are a broad recognition of Australia's diverse live industry, celebrating the success of the Australian live scene. The awards commenced in 2016.

Year	Nominee / work	Award	Result
2017	Middle Kids	International Live Achievement (Group)	Nominated
2019	Middle Kids	Live Indie / Rock Act of the Year	Nominated
