= Notion (EP) =

EP by Tash Sultana
- Released: 23 September 2016
- Labels: Lonely Lands; Sony Music Australia; Mom + Pop Music
- Producer: Tash Sultana

Tash Sultana chronology
Yin Yang (2013)	Notion (2016)	Flow State (2018)

Singles from Notion
- 1. "Gemini" Released: 14 April 2016; 2. "Notion" Released: 17 June 2016; 3. "Jungle" Released: 6 September 2016

Notion is the second extended play by Australian singer-songwriter Tash Sultana, released on 23 September 2016, through their own record label, Lonely Lands Records (distributed by Sony Music Australia in Australia, and Mom + Pop elsewhere).

At the ARIA Music Awards of 2017, Notion was nominated for three ARIA Music Awards; Best Independent Release, Breakthrough Artists and Best Blues and Roots Album.

== Track listing ==
All tracks are written by Tash Sultana.

No.	Title	Length
1.	"Synergy"	4:19
2.	"Gemini"	4:09
3.	"Notion"	5:41
4.	"Jungle"	5:16
5.	"Big Smoke, Pt.1" (live)	11:13
6.	"Big Smoke, Pt.2" (live)	9:38

== Charts ==
Chart (2016–17)	Peak position
Australian Albums (ARIA)	8
Dutch Albums (Album Top 100)	114
Chart (2021)	Peak position
Swiss Albums (Schweizer Hitparade)	64

== Certifications ==
Region	Certification	Certified units/sales
Australia (ARIA)	Gold	35,000^{‡}
New Zealand (RMNZ)	Platinum	15,000^{‡}
^{‡} Sales+streaming figures based on certification alone.

== Release history ==
Album formats and release dates
Region	Date	Format	Label	Catalogue
Australia	23 September 2016	Digital download; streaming; CD	Lonely Lands	LLRTS000001
Australia	23 September 2016	LP	Lonely Lands	LLRTS000003
Various	2017	Digital download; streaming; CD	Mom + Pop	MP280
