= Tash Sultana =

Australian musician

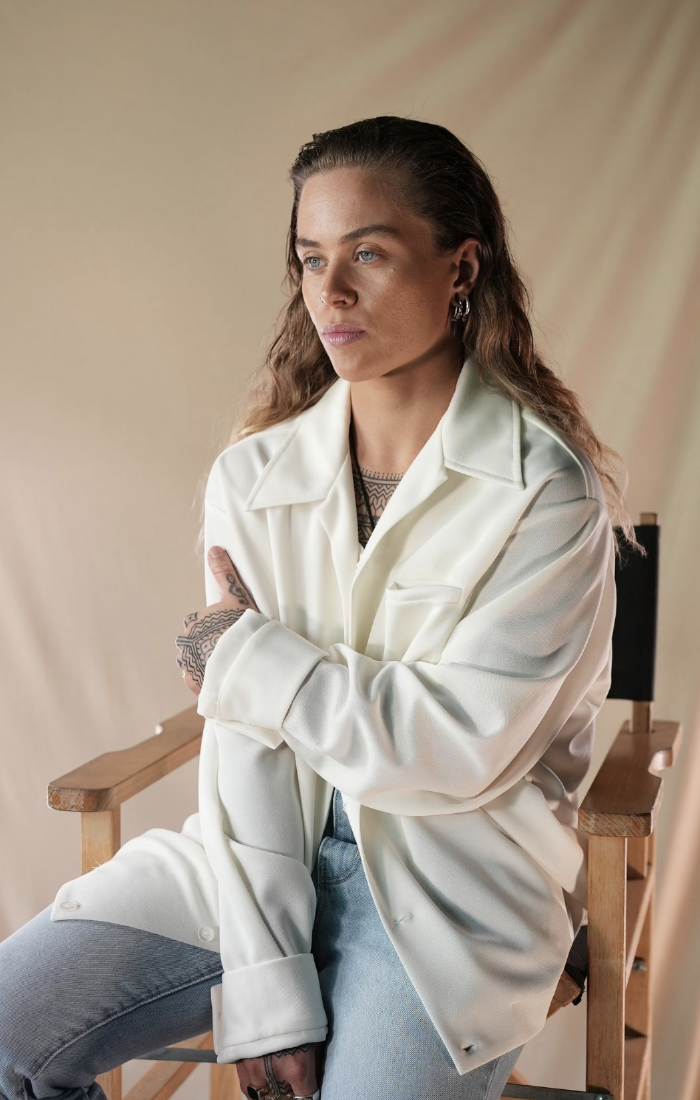

Background information
- Born: 15 June 1995 (age 31); Melbourne, Australia
- Genres: Psychedelic rock; reggae; soul; R&B; hip hop; neo soul
- Occupations: Singer; songwriter; musician; producer
- Instruments: Guitar; vocals; piano; keyboard; bass; percussion; beatmaking/sampling; trumpet; saxophone; flute; mandolin; oud; harmonica; panpipes
- Years active: 2008–present
- Labels: Lonely Lands Records; Mom+Pop Records; Sony Music Australia; Lonely Lands Agency; BMG
- Formerly of: Mindpilot
- Website: www.tashsultana.com

Taj Hendrix "Tash" Sultana (born 15 June 1995) is an Australian singer-songwriter, multi-instrumentalist and music producer, described as a "one-person band". Sultana rose to international prominence with their 2016 single "Jungle", which was voted into third place in Triple J's Hottest 100 countdown of 2016. The following year, Sultana had three songs voted into Triple J's Hottest 100 of 2017; "Mystik" placing at number 28, "Murder to the Mind" at number 43, and their Like a Version cover of MGMT's "Electric Feel" at number 78.

Sultana grew up in Melbourne and has been playing guitar from the age of three, beginning a career in music through busking. An active musician on Bandcamp since 2013, Sultana's recordings were viewed millions of times on YouTube in 2016. Sultana's EP, Notion, was released in September 2016, followed by a sold-out world tour in early 2017.

Sultana plays up to fifteen instruments, including trumpet, saxophone, pan flute, piano and guitar. In 2026, Sultana signed a global record deal with BMG.

== Early life ==
An Australian of Maltese ancestry on their father's side, Sultana was born in and grew up in Melbourne. They received a guitar from their grandfather at the age of three.

== Career ==
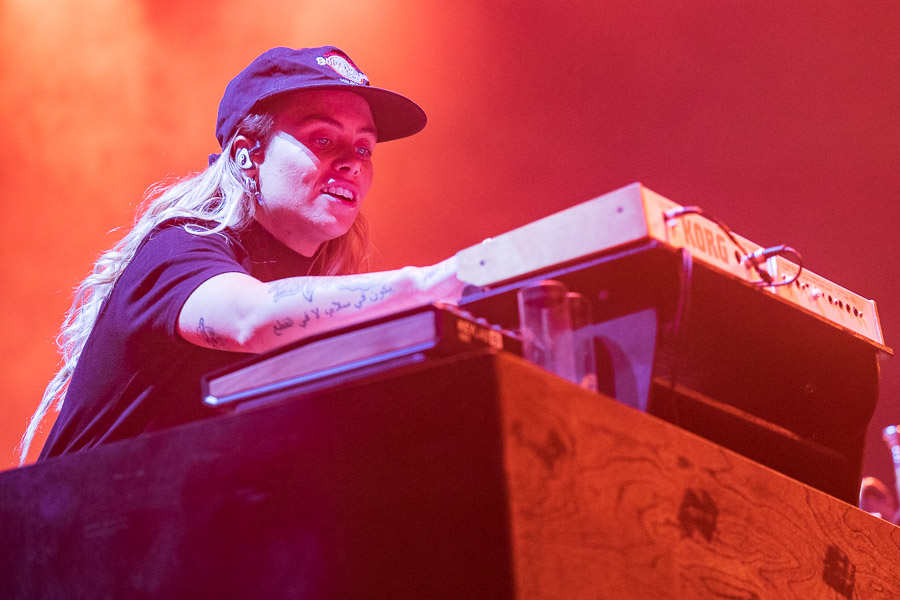
Sultana on stage at Oslo Spektrum 2022

=== Early career: "Jungle" and home busking videos ===
At the age of 13, Sultana performed in open mic nights up to 6 times a week across Victoria. Their refusal to conform to social norms pushed the artist, who at the time was unable to find regular work, to busking on the streets of Melbourne to make a living. From 2008 to 2012, Sultana was the vocalist of the band Mindpilot with Patrick O'Brien, Emily Daye and David Herbert. This band won several Battles of the Bands competitions in Melbourne. The band split in 2012.

In 2016, Sultana shared a video on social media of "Jungle" that amassed over one million views within five days, and has since been viewed over 40 million times. In the same year, they won Triple J's J Award for Unearthed Artist of the Year, and had two tracks voted into the Triple J Hottest 100, 2016: "Jungle" (No. 3) and "Notion" (No. 32). Both are singles from their subsequently released EP, Notion. Sultana performed at the Woodford Folk Festival, Southbound, and St Jerome's Laneway Festival. Sultana is managed by Lemon Tree Music with whom they signed in June 2016.

Sultana spent time in the recording studio with producer Nikita Miltiadou, and began working on the EP release Notion. In September 2016, they released the EP through their own independent record label, Lonely Lands Records. The EP reached a peak position of number 8 on the ARIA Album Chart.

=== 2016–2017: Debut world tour, and singles ===
Following the success of Notion, Sultana announced a world tour, which included hundreds of live performances across Australia, Europe, New Zealand, and the United Kingdom. Their father resigned from his job to become their roadie. A product of sessions with Miltiadou in April 2017, Sultana released "Murder to the Mind", the first single since the release of Notion. It reached number 59 on the ARIA Australian Singles Chart. Not long after the release of "Murder to the Mind", Sultana was diagnosed with laryngitis, and was forced to cancel and postpone shows across Australia.

In a June 2017 interview Sultana told Fairfax that their debut album was slated for release in April 2018, after which they had planned to tour, record a second album, tour again, and then take a break and return to normal life. On 25 July 2017, Sultana announced the Homecoming Tour, including performances in Adelaide (Entertainment Centre), Sydney (Hordern Pavilion), Fremantle (Arts Centre), Margaret River (3 Oceans Winery), Melbourne (Margaret Court Arena) and Noosa (Noosa Sporting Grounds), with Pierce Brothers and Willow Beats as supporting acts.

In October 2017 Sultana announced the premiere of a new single "Mystik" on Triple J. Also in October, Sultana made their US late-night television debut on Late Night with Seth Meyers, performing "Jungle". In the same year, Sultana was nominated for four ARIA Awards: Breakthrough Artist, Best Independent Release, Best Blues and Roots Album and Best Australian Live Act.

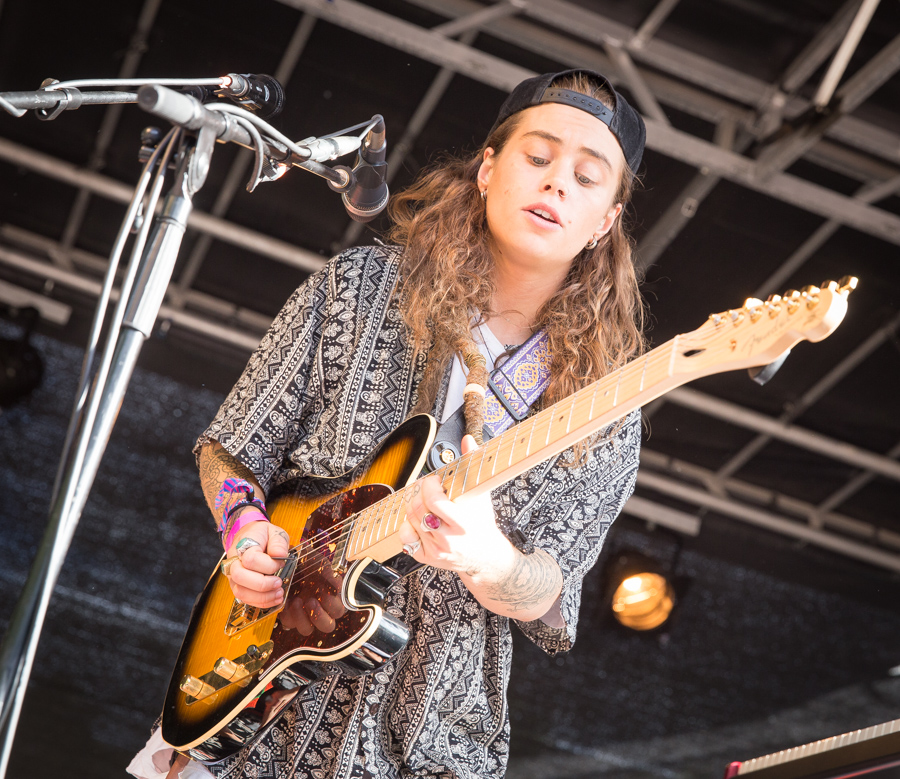
Sultana performing in 2017

Following the Homecoming Tour, Sultana continued work on their debut LP, Flow State.

=== 2018: Debut LP Flow State ===
On 13 June 2018 Sultana sent out a private Facebook message to selected fans, with a video sneak peek of a new single titled "Salvation", accompanied by footage in the studio. In the same month, Sultana announced that the new single would premiere on Triple J on 21 June, and would be released the following day on 22 June.

On 21 June 2018 they announced the album's forthcoming release date would be 31 August 2018, and made pre-orders available. Sultana also announced the album's tracklist, including the previously released tracks "Mystik", "Murder To The Mind", "Harvest Love" and "Free Mind".

The album was released on 31 August 2018 via Lonely Lands Records, distributed by Sony Music Australia in Australia, and Mom + Pop Music across the rest of the world. Flow State peaked at number 2 on the ARIA Albums Charts.

=== 2019: Flow State Tour, "Can't Buy Happiness", "Daydreaming" and "Talk It Out" ===
In February 2019, and in support of Flow State, Sultana played their biggest headlining Australian shows yet, including a sold-out show at Melbourne's Sidney Myer Music Bowl, and Brisbane's Riverstage. Sultana's first release for 2019 was the standalone single "Can't Buy Happiness", released on 4 April. Then, on 10 July, Sultana released their first collaborative track "Talk It Out", which featured Australian singer Matt Corby. Sultana's third and final single release for 2019 was the single "Daydreaming", a collaboration with Milky Chance.

=== 2020–2022: Sophomore album Terra Firma ===
Early in 2020 Sultana announced they were recruiting for live session musicians to round out their on stage presence on social media, stating they 'didn't have enough hands' to play all instruments on stage at the same time. On 26 February, Sultana played their final partial solo live show at Melbourne's Sidney Myer Music Bowl as part of the one-day fundraising music festival Down To Earth. The event was raising funds for bushfire relief, following Australia's Black Summer bushfires, and included performances by Gang of Youths, Angus and Julia Stone and more.

In April 2020 Sultana announced that they had found session band members to take on the road. They subsequently released their first single for 2020, "Pretty Lady" on 9 April. The track was premiered on triple j Breakfast the same day. Shortly after, Sultana released the "Pretty Lady" music video, featuring a selection of fans, friends and family from across the world dancing.

In June 2020 Sultana announced the next single "Greed", which was released on 20 June 2020. This was followed by a third single, "Beyond The Pine" in September, and a fourth single "Willow Tree" in October, which featured Australian rapper Jerome Farah.

On the same day as the release of "Willow Tree", Sultana announced that their new album Terra Firma would be released on 19 February 2021.

Written and recorded over a period of almost 2 years, between 2019 and 2021, Terra Firma saw Sultana lead the entire recording process. They recorded, engineered, performed, arranged and produced the album in its entirety.

On 22 January 2021 Sultana released the fifth and final single from Terra Firma, "Sweet & Dandy".

Terra Firma was released on 19 February 2021, and was met with generally favourable reviews from critics.

In 2021 Sultana announced a United Kingdom and Europe tour in support of Terra Firma, with dates taking place from March 2022. They also announced a one-off performance at Colorado's Red Rocks Amphitheatre, which sold 10,000 tickets within five minutes.

On 1 February 2022 Sultana announced their anticipated two-month tour of North America. The North America tour has dates listed from 10 June (Las Vegas) to 23 July (Los Angeles).

On 18 February 2022 Sultana released "Coma", the lead single from MTV Unplugged, Live in Melbourne album, scheduled for release in May 2022.

=== 2023–present: Sugar EP. and Return to the Roots ===
In March 2023, Sultana released "James Dean", the lead single from an EP scheduled for release in 2023. In July 2023, Sultana released "Bitter Lovers" and announced Sugar EP. would be released on 11 August 2023.

In February 2025, Sultana released the single "Milk and Honey", their first released since 2023. In March 2025, Sultana announced the forthcoming release of the EP Return to the Roots.

In September 2026, Sultana released "Something in the Water" after signing a global recording deal with BMG.

== Personal life ==
Sultana identifies as gender-fluid and uses they/them pronouns.

== Discography ==
=== Albums ===
- Flow State (2018)
- Terra Firma (2021)
- Sonic Alchemy (2027)

=== EPs ===
- Notion (2017)
- Sugar EP. (2023)
- Return to the Roots (2025)

== Awards and nominations ==
=== APRA Awards ===
The APRA Awards are presented annually from 1982 by the Australasian Performing Right Association (APRA), "honouring composers and songwriters".

Year	Nominee / work	Award	Result
2017	"Jungle"	Song of the Year	Shortlisted
2018	"Murder to the Mind"	Song of the Year	Shortlisted
2018	"Jungle"	Blues & Roots Work of the Year	Nominated
2019	Tash Sultana	Songwriter of the Year	Nominated
2019	"Mystik"	Blues & Roots Work of the Year	Nominated
2020	"Blackbird"	Most Performed Blues & Roots Work of the Year	Nominated
2021	"Pretty Lady"	Most Performed Blues & Roots Work of the Year	Nominated
2026	"Milk & Honey"	Most Performed Blues & Roots Work	Nominated

=== ARIA Music Awards ===
The ARIA Music Awards are annual awards, which recognises excellence, innovation, and achievement across all genres of Australian music. They commenced in 1987. Sultana has won one award from thirteen nominations.

Year	Nominee / work	Award	Result	Ref.
2017	Notion	Best Independent Release	Nominated	
2017	Notion	Breakthrough Artists	Nominated	
2017	Notion	Best Blues and Roots Album	Nominated	
2017	Notion Tour	Best Australian Live Act	Nominated	
2018	Flow State	Best Female Artist	Nominated	
2018	Flow State	Best Blues and Roots Album	Won	
2018	Homecoming Tour	Best Australian Live Act	Nominated	
2018	Tash Sultana for Flow State	Producer of the Year	Nominated	
2018	Ben Lopez for Flow State	Best Cover Art	Nominated	
2018	Glenn Mossop and Tash Sultana for "Salvation"	Best Video	Nominated	
2019	"Can't Buy Happiness"	Best Soul/R&B Release	Nominated	
2020	"Pretty Lady"	Best Soul/R&B Release	Nominated	
2021	Terra Firma	Best Soul/R&B Release	Nominated	
2025	Return to the Roots	Best Blues & Roots Album	Nominated	

=== Environmental Music Prize ===
The Environmental Music Prize is a quest to find a theme song to inspire action on climate and conservation. It commenced in 2022.

Year	Nominee / work	Award	Result	Ref.
2023	"Willow Tree"	Environmental Music Prize	Nominated	

=== J Awards ===
The J Awards are an annual series of Australian music awards that were established by the Australian Broadcasting Corporation's youth-focused radio station Triple J. They commenced in 2005.

Year	Nominee / work	Award	Result
2016	Themself	Unearthed Artist of the Year	Won
2018	Flow State	Australian Album of the Year	Nominated

=== Music Victoria Awards ===
The Music Victoria Awards are an annual awards night celebrating Victorian music. They commenced in 2006.

Year	Nominee / work	Award	Result	Ref.
2017	Tash Sultana	Best Female Artist	Nominated	
2018	Tash Sultana	Best Solo Artist	Nominated	

=== National Live Music Awards ===
The National Live Music Awards (NLMAs) are a broad recognition of Australia's diverse live industry, celebrating the success of the Australian live scene. The awards commenced in 2016.

Year	Nominee / work	Award	Result
2016	Tash Sultana	Live Roots Act of the Year	Won
2017	Tash Sultana	Live Country or Folk Act of the Year	Nominated
2017	Tash Sultana	Live Guitarist of the Year	Won
2017	Tash Sultana	International Live Achievement (Solo)	Won
2017	Tash Sultana	Best Live Voice – People's Choice	Nominated
2018	Tash Sultana	International Live Achievement (Solo)	Nominated
2019	Tash Sultana	Live Blues and Roots Act of the Year	Nominated
2019	Tash Sultana	International Live Achievement (Solo)	Nominated

=== Pop Awards ===
The Pop Awards are presented annually by Pop Magazine, honoring the best in popular music. Tash Sultana has won two awards from two nominations and is the first artist to win multiple Pop Awards.

Year	Nominee / work	Award	Result	Ref.
2019	Flow State	Album of the Year Award	Won	
2019	Tash Sultana	Emerging Artist of the Year Award	Won	

=== Rolling Stone Australia Awards ===
The Rolling Stone Australia Awards are awarded annually in January or February by the Australian edition of Rolling Stone magazine for outstanding contributions to popular culture in the previous year.

Year	Nominee / work	Award	Result	Ref.
2021	"Pretty Lady"	Best Single	Won	
2021	Tash Sultana	Rolling Stone Global Award	Nominated	
2022	Terra Firma	Best Record	Nominated	
2023	Tash Sultana	Rolling Stone Global Award	Won	

== Touring ==
All tour dates and ticketing information can be located at www.tashsultana.com

- Gemini Tour: Australia (2016)
- Notion World Tour: Germany, United Kingdom, Netherlands, Australia, New Zealand (2016–17)
- USA Tour 2017: United States (2017)
- North American Tour: United States (2017)
- Australia/New Zealand Tour: Australia, New Zealand (2017)
- UK/Europe Tour: United Kingdom (2017)
- Homecoming Tour: Australia (2017)
- World Tour 2018: Europe, United States, Canada, New Zealand, United Kingdom (2018)
- Flow State World Tour: Canada, United States, Europe, United Kingdom, Australia, New Zealand (2019)
- Tash Sultana And Friends: Australia, New Zealand (2019)
- UK And Europe 2022: United Kingdom, Europe (2022)
- North America 2022: North America, USA (2022)
- Return To The Roots USA Tour 2025: North America, USA (2025)
