= Malcolm Besley =

- Born: Melbourne, Australia
- Occupations: Record producer; songwriter mixer
- Years active: 2012–present
- Website: malcolmbesley.com

Malcolm Besley is an Australian record producer, songwriter and mix engineer. He is known for his work with Northeast Party House, Slowly Slowly, Client Liaison and Shouse.

== Career ==
Malcolm learned piano from a young age and briefly sang for the Australian Boys Choir before quitting music all together, until his late teens where frustrated with the high school orchestral system he formed various punk and metal bands with school friends. After finishing High School Malcolm went on to study for cinema and media in an arts degree at La Trobe University, he dropped out mid second year and went on to earn an advanced diploma of Music Production at Box Hill TAFE. Malcolm began working as the in-house assistant at The Base Studios South Melbourne under the producer Forrester Savell

== Discography ==
Year	Artist	Song title	Album	Credit	Record label	Certifications
2012	City Calm Down		Movements EP	Producer, Mixer	I Oh You	
2012	Snakadaktal	"Dance Bear"		Producer, Mixer	I Oh You	
2012	Millions		Cruel EP	Producer, Mixer	EMI	
2013	Gold Fields		Black Sun LP	Producer, Mixer	Astrelwerks	
2013	Snakadaktal		Dance Bear / Air	Producer, Mixer	I Oh You	
2014	Northeast Party House		Any Given Weekend LP	Co Producer, Mixer	EMI	
2014	The Holidays		Real Feel EP	Producer, Mixer	Liberation	
2014	Client Liaison	"Pretty Lovers / Feeling"		Mixer	Remote Control	
2015	City Calm Down		In a Restless House LP	Producer, Mixer	I Oh You	
2015	Jakubi	"Couch Potato / Feels Like Yesterday"	Holiday EP	Producer, Mixer	EPIC	
2016	Northeast Party House	"Calypso Beach"	Dare LP	Co Producer, Mixer	EMI	ARIA: Platinum ARIA: Gold
2017	The Creases		Tremelow LP	Producer, Mixer	Liberation	
2018	City Calm Down		Echoes in Blue LP	Producer, Mixer	I Oh You	
2019	Congrats	"Cut Down The Middle"		Producer, Mixer	UNFD	
2020	Slowly Slowly		Racecar Blues	Producer, Mixer	UNFD	
2020	Polish Club	"Just Talking"	Now We're Cookin LP	Producer, Mixer	Universal	
2020	Northeast Party House		Shelf Life LP	Co Producer, Mixer	Sony Music	
2020	Cub Sport | Mallrat | Northeast Party House	"Break Me Down" Remix		Mixer	Believe	
2021	Washington	"Switches"		Mastering	Universal	
2021	Flowerkid	"Why Bother / Take Two"	Everyone Has a Breaking Point EP	Mixing	Warner Music	
2022	KANADA THE LOOP	"January"		Mixer	Seven Seven Records	
2022	Shouse	"Won't Forget You"		Mixer	ONELOVE	

== General references ==
- https://www.abc.net.au/triplejunearthed/artist/commoner/
- https://cityhubsydney.com.au/tag/malcolm-besley/
- https://www.thegov.com.au/index.php/gig_guide/gig/e64515
- https://themusic.com.au/streams/single-premiere-viera-motel-take-heart/aEhwen18f34/03-07-19/
