= Benjamin Stewart =

Ben or Benjamin Stewart may refer to:

- Ben Stewart, Canadian politician
- Benjamin F. Stewart (1851–?), U.S. Army soldier and Medal of Honor recipient
- Benjamin Stewart (dancer), dancer with the San Francisco Ballet
- Benjamin Stewart (musician), Australian singer and member of Slowly Slowly (band)
- Ben Stewart (Blue Heelers), a character on the Australian television program Blue Heelers, played by Paul Bishop
- Benjamin D. Stewart (1878–1976), American mining engineer and politician, signer of the constitution of Alaska
- Mount Ben Stewart, a 3,248 feet (990 m) mountain on Douglas Island, Juneau, Alaska and the island's highest point, named for Benjamin D. Stewart

== See also ==
- John Benjamin Stewart (1924–2015), Canadian politician
