= Northeast Party House =

Australian electronic music band

- Origin: Melbourne, Victoria, Australia
- Genres: Alternative; electronic; indie; dance
- Years active: 2009–2025
- Label: Sony Music Australia
- Members: Sean Kenihan; Jack Shoe; Zachary Hamilton-Reeves; Mitch Ansell; Malcolm Besley; Oliver Packard
- Website: northeastpartyhouse.com

Northeast Party House is an Australian electronic band formed in Melbourne in 2009. The band's six members are Jack Shoe (guitar), Malcolm Besley (drums), Sean Kenihan (synth), Zach Hamilton-Reeves (vocals), Mitch Ansell (guitar) and Oliver Packard (bass).

== Musical career ==
=== 2011–2016: Career beginnings and Any Given Weekend ===
In early 2010 Northeast Party House began playing warehouse parties and local venues and quickly gained a following based on their reputation for delivering high energy live shows.

A demo version of the band's track 'Dusk' gained local airplay, eventually winning Triple J's Unearthed competition and being invited to play at the Pyramid Rock Festival 2010.

In 2011 the band played alongside acts such as Does It Offend You, Yeah?, The Go! Team, Kimbra and Ball Park Music as well as finishing the year with a stand out set at Falls Festival.

The group self-released their debut self-titled EP in November 2011, featuring four tracks including lead single "Embezzler". and a new version of "Dusk".

In May 2014, Northeast Party House released their debut album Any Given Weekend which also led to their international debut performing shows in Los Angeles as part of Culture Collide Festival and New York at CMJ Music Marathon.

=== 2016–2021: Dare and Shelf Life ===
Early 2016 saw the band complete the writing and recording for their second album – titled Dare. Dare's recording was split across Melbourne and London while the band was touring the UK and Europe in May, where they also played The Great Escape Festival and Dot to Dot Festival. The self-produced Dare was mixed and mastered by in-house drummer Malcolm Besley. The album was preceded by single "For You". "For You" was certified gold in Australia by the Australian Recording Industry Association (ARIA) in 2021.

In 2017, North East Party House covered Childish Gambino's "Redbone" for Triple J's Like a Version.

In February 2020, the band released their third studio album, Shelf Life via Sony Music Australia.

=== 2022–2025: Enhancer and split ===
On 5 August 2022, Northeast Party House released the standalone single "Cranky Boy".

In March 2024, the group released "Dark Boy", the third single from their fourth studio album, Enhancer; released on 17 May 2024. In August 2025, the band announced that they would be splitting up following a final tour in November, dubbed The Final Party.

== Discography ==
=== Studio albums ===
List of studio albums, with release date, label, and selected chart positions shown
Title	Details	Peak chart positions
Title	Details	AUS
Any Given Weekend	Released: 16 May 2014; Label: Stop Start (SSM82); Formats: CD, LP, digital download	62
Dare	Released: 9 September 2016; Label: Stop Start (SSM123); Formats: CD, LP, digital download	38
Shelf Life	Released: 28 February 2020; Label: Sony (19439715611); Formats: CD, LP, digital download, streaming	59
Enhancer	Released: 17 May 2024; Label: Sony (19658892271); Formats: LP, digital download, streaming	—

=== Extended plays ===
Title	Details
Northeast Party House	Released: 2 December 2011; Label: Northeast Party House; Formats: CD, digital download

=== Singles ===
Title	Year	Certifications	Album
"Embezzler"	2011		Northeast Party House
"Pascal Cavalier"	2012		Non-album singles
"Stand Tall"	2012		Non-album singles
"The Haunted"	2014		Any Given Weekend
"Sick Boy"	2014		Any Given Weekend
"Fake Friends"	2014		Any Given Weekend
"Perfect Lines"	2015		Non-album single
"For You"	2016	ARIA: Gold	Dare
"Heartbreaker"	2016		Dare
"Calypso Beach"	2017	ARIA: Platinum	Dare
"Your House"	2017		Dare
"Magnify"	2019	ARIA: Gold	Shelf Life
"Dominos"	2019		Shelf Life
"Shelf Life"	2020		Shelf Life
"The Desert"	2020		Shelf Life
"Cranky Boy"	2022		Non-album single
"Brain Freeze"	2023		Enhancer
"Wish We Could"	2024		Enhancer
"Dark Boy"	2024		Enhancer
"Enhancer"	2024		Enhancer
"L.A."	2024		Enhancer

== Award and nominations ==
=== ARIA Music Awards ===
The ARIA Music Awards is an annual awards ceremony that recognises excellence, innovation, and achievement across all genres of Australian music.

Year	Nominee / work	Award	Result
2020	Shelf Life	Best Dance Release	Nominated

== Tours and festivals ==
- Headline 'Kick Ons' Tour (2014)
- Headline 'Double Darts' Tour (2015)
- Headline 'Later Straya' Tour (2015)
- Headline US, EU, UK Tour (2015)
- Headline 'Dare' Tour (2016)
- Darwin Festival (2016)
- Headline 'Calypso Beach' Tour (2017)
- The Hills Are Alive Festival (2017)
- Groovin' the Moo (2017)
- Snowtunes (2017)
- Yours and Owls (2017)
- Big Pineapple Music Festival (2018)
