= Big Pineapple Music Festival =

Australian music festival

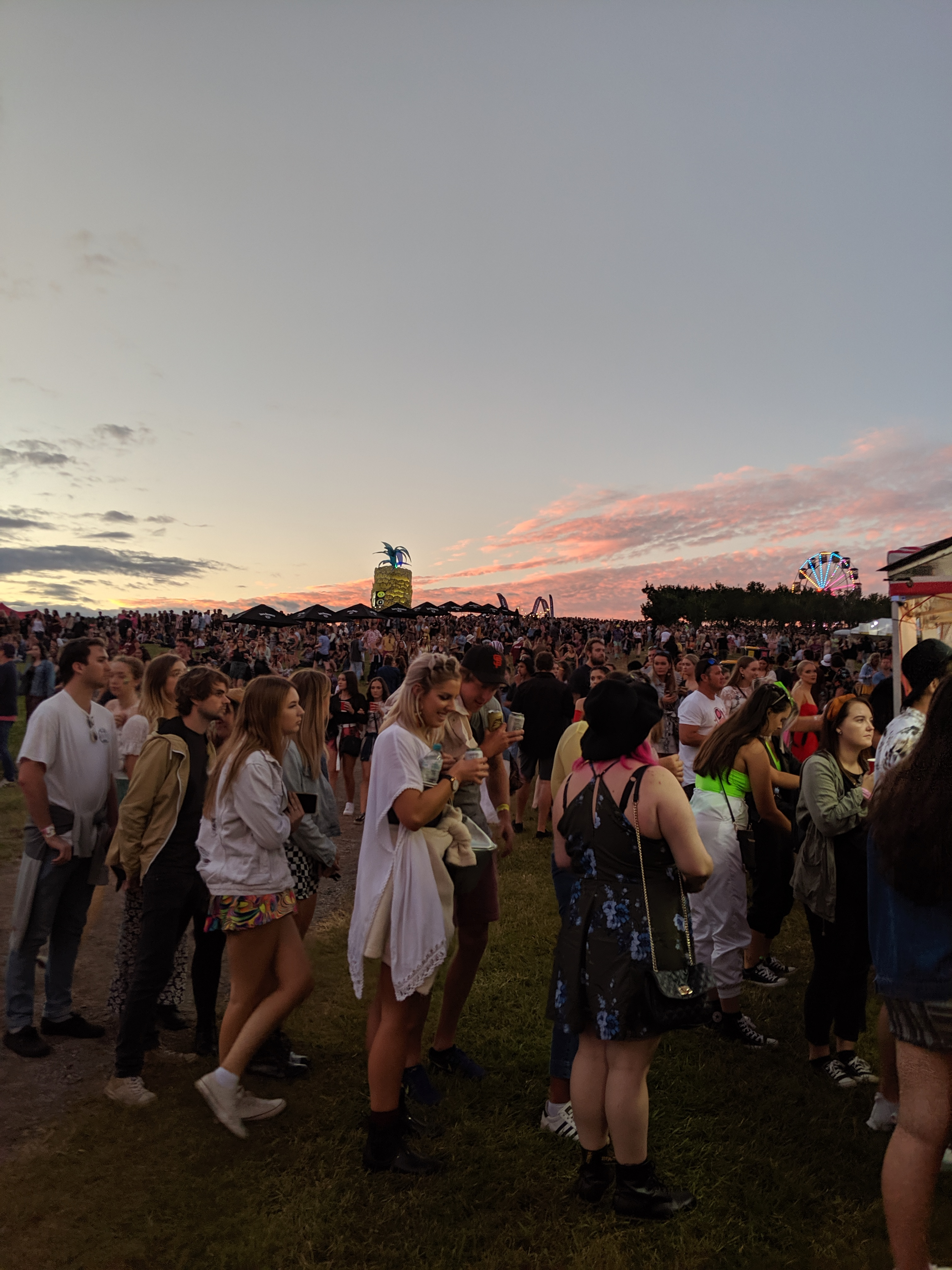
- Big Pineapple Music Festival in 2019
- Locations: 76 Nambour Connection Road, Woombye, Sunshine Coast, Queensland 4559
- Years active: 2013-present
- Founders: Mark Pico Brad Ranki Peter Kendall Brendon Weatherill
- Previous event: 22 May 2021
- Website: www.bigpineapplefestival.com.au

The Big Pineapple Music Festival is held annually at the Big Pineapple Landmark, in Woombye, Queensland, Australia. The festival features a range of artists from a variety of genres and first occurred on 21 April 2013 with over 8,000 tickets purchased. The festival was initially developed by the new Big Pineapple landmark owners, in an attempt to pull the business out of bankruptcy. From 2016 to 2019, the festival has repeatedly sold out, with the 2019 Big Pineapple Music Festival reporting a record attendance of 16,000 people. The Big Pineapple Music Festival has consecutively won the ‘People’s Choice Award Festival of the Year’ for 2018 and 2019 at the Queensland Music Awards.

The Big Pineapple Music Festival showcases emerging and established Australian artists, with an occasional international act. Noteworthy acts that have performed on Big Pineapple Music Festival's stages include Peking Duk, Hayden James, Bliss N Eso, Allday, Vera Blue, Touch Sensitive, PNAU, Hermitude, John Butler Trio, Birds of Tokyo and Grinspoon.

Festival organisers had plans to expand the festival to a two-day event in 2020, but the event was cancelled in 2020 due to restrictions imposed when the COVID-19 pandemic occurred.

== Description ==
The Big Pineapple Music Festival is held annually in Woombye, Queensland, Australia. The festival was developed by new owners of the Big Pineapple landmark, as a turnaround venture of a broader strategic plan, to help the business emerge from bankruptcy. The festival first occurred on 21 April 2013. Since its debut in 2013 the festival has occurred annually. However, from 2014–present the festival has taken place mostly at the end of autumn, during the second half of May. In recent years, the festival has recorded attendance above 15000, with the 2016, 2017 and 2018 festivals selling out. In 2019, the festival increased the number of available tickets to 16,000 and sold out in just two weeks.

== History ==
=== Venue ===
The Big Pineapple in Woombye is a part of a "big" group of Australian tourist attractions. Alongside the Big Pineapple is Coffs Harbour's ‘Big Banana’, Ballina's ‘Big Prawn’ and Goulburn's ‘Big Merino’. The Big Pineapple comprises a 170-hectare site, with a total capacity for 16,000 people. The Big Pineapple went into liquidation in the 2000s and was purchased by Brad Rankin and Peter Kendall in 2011. In 2017, the pair lodged a development application for the Big Pineapple with the Sunshine Coast Regional Council. The application contained plans to expand the Big Pineapples current facilities by developing a hotel with 120 rooms, a potential brewery/winery, food hub and additional camping facilities. The development application has been approved by the Sunshine Coast Regional Council and the Big Pineapple is set to undergo a significant refurbishment valued at $6.8 million. The Queensland Government is providing funding equal to $2.5 million, to support the crucial upgrades of the refurbishment such as Wi-Fi, kiosk and online ticketing and extensive landscaping. The development plan is estimated to take 10 years to complete and will include glamorous camping, eco-villas, a hotel and nature walks through the food preparation hub. The redevelopment will debut a tree top challenge, as well as host more music events and a regional food event. The Tourism Industry Development Minister has advised the project will attract 160,000 extra visitors and pump approximately 4.5 million in the local economy annually.

=== Music Festival ===
The Big Pineapple Music Festival was first held on 20 April 2013 and has taken place annually since. In 2013, over 8000 tickets were purchased by people from Brisbane, Gold Coast, Adelaide, Perth and Cairns. In exchange for a free ticket, 200 people volunteered to assist with running and cleaning up the festival. The Big Pineapple Music Festivals in 2016, 2017, 2018 and 2019 sold out, with all available tickets being purchased before the festival date. This year's Big Pineapple Music Festival set a new record for the time taken to sell out, with all 16,000 available tickets purchased within two weeks of being on sale.

=== Future ===
The owners and organisers of the festival contacted Tourism Queensland and requested permission to expand the length of the festival from one day to two days. This request was approved and the festival organisers planned to deliver the first two-day Big Pineapple Music Festival in 2020.

In 2020 the event was initially postponed from May to November 2020, due to Federal government restriction of non-essential event numbers to 500 maximum, imposed when the COVID-19 pandemic began, it was then cancelled in August. The 2021 festival went ahead as scheduled on 22 May.

== Line ups ==
=== 2013 ===
- Grinspoon
- Birds of Tokyo
- Regurgitator
- British India
- Black Seeds
- Hermitude
- Ash Grunwald
- OKA
- Bobby Alu
- Kingswood
- Sticky Fingers
- Chance Waters
- Dialectrix
- Cheap Fakes
- Andy Dub
- The Leisure Bandits

=== 2014 ===
- Bliss N Eso
- The Living End
- Art Vs Science
- Spiderbait
- Alison Wonderland
- Opiuo
- Funkoars
- Diafrix
- Kim Churchill
- Tuka
- Kat Fitz & Cara
- Redcoats
- Kingfisha
- Mason Rack
- Mr Hill & Rahjconkas
- Drawcard
- Band of Frequencies
- Cheap Fakes
- Ashleigh Mannix
- Lurch & Chief
- Total Eclipse
- Rattraps
- The Hi-Boys
- Generik
- Ribongia
- Mouvement
- Blackdiamond
- The Brains Trust
- Hope Springs
- Jasti
- The Tea Society
- Young Franco
- Dead Letter Circus

=== 2015 ===
- The John Butler Trio
- The Jezabels
- Jebediah
- Violent Soho
- Thundamentals
- Drawcard
- The Hi Boys
- Dallas Frasca
- Dune Rats
- Timberwolf
- The Belligerents
- Sahara Beck
- The Floating Bridges
- MC Wheels
- Coin Banks
- Sarah Howells
- Karl S. Williams
- Dubarray
- The Dawn Chorus
- In2Nation
- The Black Catapult

=== 2016 ===
- RUFUS
- You Am I
- Hermitude
- The Veronicas
- The Smith Street Band
- DMA's
- Tkay Maidza
- Regurgitator
- Holy Moly
- The Delta Riggs
- Yahtzel
- Opiuo
- KLP (DJ set)
- Yeo
- The Bennies
- Tijuana Cartel
- Dylan Joel
- Odd Mob
- Mathas
- Sahara Beck
- GG Magree
- The Ninjas
- The Floating Bridges
- Lyall Moloney
- Transvaal Diamond Syndicate
- The Brains Trust
- Khan Harrison Band
- Gurps Band
- Buck Dean and The Green Lips
- Batchelo
- Jenga

=== 2017 ===
- Birds of Tokyo
- Peking Duk
- Northlane
- Cloud Control
- The Veronicas
- City Calm Down
- Ldru
- Dz Deathrays
- Urthboy
- Vera Blue
- High Tropics
- Arpier
- The Hi Boys
- Harts
- Alex Lahey
- Boo Seeka
- Polish Club
- Ngaiire
- Sampa The Great
- Bootleg Rascal
- Jack River
- Nicole Millar
- Pierce Brothers
- Barefoot
- In2nation
- Buck Dean & The Green Lips
- Citizen Kay
- Bec Sandridge
- Benson
- Moonbase
- Fortunes
- Winston Surfshirt
- Ocean Alley
- West Thebarton Brothel Party
- Gold Member
- Hey Geronimo
- Safia
- Bearfoot
- Fight Ibis (winner of Triple J's Unearth 2017 competition).

=== 2018 ===
- Violent Soho
- Illy
- Dune Rats
- The Preatures
- Allday
- Hayden James
- Cub Sport
- Cog
- Butterfingers
- Crooked Colours
- Myxen
- POW! Negro
- Psychedelic Porn Crumpets
- E^ST
- Kilter
- Kim Churchill
- Slumberjack
- Luke Million
- Northeast Party House
- ShockOne
- Tired Lion
- Arno Faraji
- Carmouflage Rose
- Rackett
- Suidgenini
- The Moving Stills
- Clews
- Doolie
- Greta Stanley
- Hobo Magic
- Imbi The Girl
- Kira Puru
- Maddy Jane
- Moody Beach
- Mookhi
- Pandamic
- The Vanns
- Fragile Animals (winner of Triple J's Unearthed 2018 competition)

=== 2019 ===
- Peking Duk
- Broods
- PNAU
- Vera Blue
- Thundamentals
- Karnivool
- Benson
- Confidence Man
- Hands Like Houses
- Hatchie
- Last Dinosaurs
- Joy
- KLP
- Running Touch
- Rakeem Miles
- Kota Banks
- The Chats
- Laurel
- Touch Sensitive
- Mallrat
- West Thebarton
- Stand Atlantic
- Tkay Maidza
- Wafia
- Austen
- Mane
- Gold Member
- Tones and I
- Fight Ibis
- The Dreggs

== Arrests ==
=== 2013 ===
The first Big Pineapple Music Festival was patrolled by 30 Queensland Police Officers and accompanying drug-detection dogs. Upon entry, Police officers carried out searches on approximately 1000 patrons. These searches resulted in 40 drug detections. 15 of the 40 individuals detected were arrested on drug offenses, with possession of MDMA (ecstasy) accounting for half of the charges.

=== 2014 ===
In 2014, the Police used drug-detection dogs to passively searched 1100 of the 8000 people that attended the Big Pineapple Music Festival. This resulted in a detection rate of 7.2%, with 80 people testing positive for drugs. Of these 80, 18 law breakers were identified and charged with 19 drug offenses. 18 people were charged with possession of dangerous drugs, including MDMA, ecstasy, cannabis, methylamphetamine and cocaine, and 1 person received an additional charge of possession of a dangerous weapon (knife). Police also conducted a total of 260 random breath tests on and around Nambour Connection Road on the day of the festival, with no positive readings recorded.

=== 2016 ===
In 2016, the Police Force conducted searches of between 1000 and 2000 people entering the Big Pineapple Music Festival. Drug-detection dogs were used during these searches and detected 18 patrons. Further investigation of the 18 patrons resulted in 21 drug related offenses being recorded collectively.

=== 2018 ===
In 2018, the Queensland Police force executed drug raids on two homes in Warana and Parrearra, a few days before the sixth Big Pineapple Music Festival. The officers found an ounce of cocaine, MDMA crystals, over 200 MDMA pills and close to $8000 cash. Police allege the illicit substances were destined to be sold to patrons at the Big Pineapple Music Festival. A 20-year-old man found at the Warana property was charged with 12 offences, and a 23-year-old man at the Parrearra home was charged with 4 drug offences. Drug-detection dogs were utilised by Police officers to passively search 1000 to 2000 of the 14000 festival patrons (Lyons, 2018). 17 people were identified and charged with possession of drugs.

=== 2019 ===
In 2019, the Queensland Police Force employed uniform officers, drug-detection dogs and undercover officers to monitor the Big Pineapple Music Festival. Police officers and accompanying drug-detection dogs searched approximately 1000 patrons, of which 45 people were arrested on drug-related charges. The charges included possession of cocaine, LSD, marijuana, MDMA and amphetamine.

== Awards ==
=== Queensland Music Awards ===
The Queensland Music Awards (previously known as Q Song Awards) are annual awards celebrating Queensland, Australia's brightest emerging artists and established legends. They commenced in 2006.

| Year | Nominee / work | Award | Result (wins only) |
|---|---|---|---|
| 2018 | Big Pineapple Music Festival | People's Choice Festival of the Year | Won |
| 2019 | Big Pineapple Music Festival | People's Choice Festival of the Year | Won |
| 2020 | Big Pineapple Music Festival | People's Choice Festival of the Year | Won |
