= The Belligerents =

Brisbane based Indie band

The Belligerents are a five-piece indie band from Brisbane. They came to prominence winning a spot to play at Parklife in Brisbane in September 2012.

The band released their debut album, the 11-track Science Fiction in 2017, recorded in a farmhouse on Stradbroke Island. They released a single "Emily" four years later.

== See also ==
- Big Pineapple Music Festival
