= Big Pineapple =

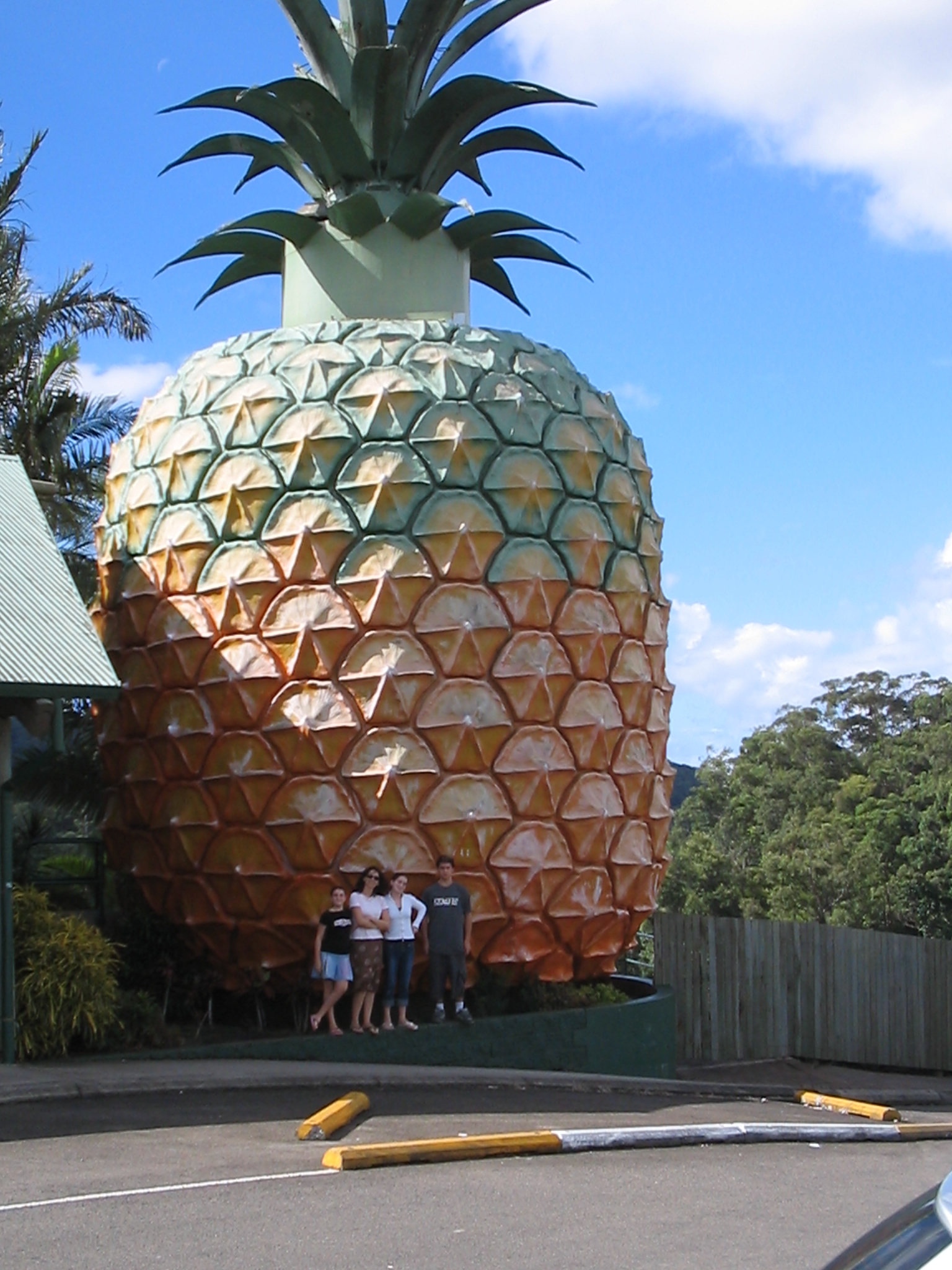
- Big Pineapple, 2005

- Location within Queensland Location within Australia
- 26°40′22″S 152°59′29″E
- Location: Nambour Connection Road, Woombye, Sunshine Coast Region, Queensland, Australia

History
- Design period: 1970s–1990s (late 20th century)
- Built: 1971

Site notes
- Architect(s): Peddle Thorp and Harvey, Paul Luff, Gary Smallcombe and Associates

Queensland Heritage Register
- Official name: The Big Pineapple (former Sunshine Plantation)
- Type: state heritage (built, landscape)
- Designated: 6 March 2009
- Reference no.: 602694
- Significant period: 1970s
- Significant components: restaurant, retail outlet

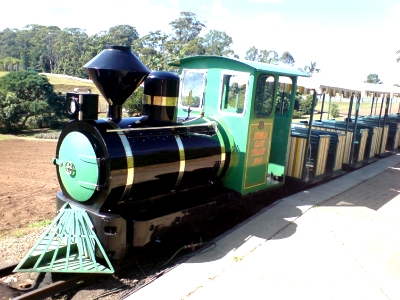
Big Pineapple train ride

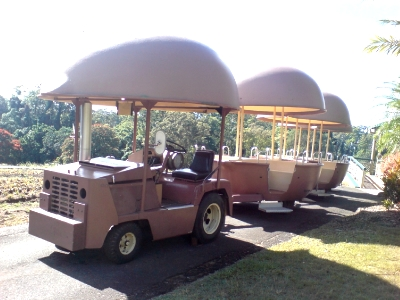
Big Pineapple Nutmobile ride

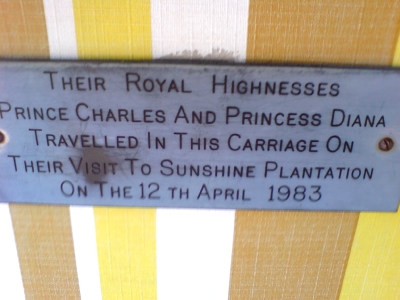
Signage indicating a royal visit

The Big Pineapple is a heritage-listed tourist attraction and big thing at Nambour Connection Road, Woombye, Sunshine Coast Region, Queensland, Australia. It was designed by Peddle Thorp and Harvey, Paul Luff, and Gary Smallcombe and Associates. It is also known as Sunshine Plantation. It was added to the Queensland Heritage Register on 6 March 2009.

The 2-level Big Pineapple is 16 metres (52 ft) high and was originally opened on 15 August 1971. It is situated on a 165-hectare (410-acre) site.

Under new ownership the owners are facilitating new attractions such as the Big Pineapple Music Festival and the Big Pineapple was also selected to host Midnight Oil within their reunion concert series in 2017. The owners are also embarking on a master planning process through community consultation to further rejuvenate the Big Pineapple experience, with a range of new attractions and services proposed.

== History ==
The former Sunshine Plantation tourist attraction, now known as The Big Pineapple, is located on the north side of the Nambour Connection Road (former Bruce Highway), just to the west of the current Bruce Highway. It holds a fond place in the memories of many domestic and overseas tourists who drove or were driven north of Brisbane on holiday road trips after 1971. Apart from the iconic value of the Big Pineapple structure itself, as a roadside attraction of the Big Thing variety, the entire 40 hectares (99 acres) complex, with its retail and restaurant spaces, train ride and Nutmobile, crops, rainforest, Macadamia Nut Factory, Big Macadamia, Tomorrow's Harvest greenhouse, Farm Show, Wildlife Gardens, and Animal Nursery, represents an early attempt at agri-tourism in Queensland.

=== Background ===
Big Things are large advertising objects, usually in the form of the item they are advertising, and are loosely defined as being at least twice the size of the object they represent and at least twice human size. Big Things have been called outdoor cultural objects which serve to construct and assert the identity of a town or area, and they have also been described as one of Australia's most distinctive home-grown forms of folk art. (The term "outdoor cultural object" was coined in the 2004 publication "Monumental Queensland: Signposts on a Cultural Landscape" by Lisanne Gibson and Joanna Besley.) The Big Pineapple appears to be the most widely recognised Big Thing in Queensland.

The first pineapple plants in Queensland were landed at the new Redcliffe settlement by the brig Amity in 1824, and in 1829, the Colonial Botanist Charles Fraser listed 34 pineapple plants amongst the crops flourishing in the 15-acre government garden at Brisbane that he had laid out in 1828. In the 1870s and 1880s, experiments in pineapple growing occurred in what would become the Maroochy Shire, but the first commercial pineapple crop in the area was at Thomas Davey's Woombye farm in 1895.

The area between the Mooloolah and Maroochy Rivers was closed to settlement prior to 1860 as part of a Reserve proclaimed by Governor George Gipps in 1842. Gipp's proclamation was rescinded by the Crown Lands Alienation Act 1860, which allowed for post-survey selection, and timber-getting licenses. In the early 1860s Edmund Lander leased the Mooloolah Back Plains run around the future site of Nambour, and timber getters started to exploit the area, working inland along waterways. The Alienation of Crown Lands Act 1868 also stimulated settlement, and by 1871 the census recorded 104 people living and working in the Maroochy region, although only 31 were permanent settlers. At this time, there were about 180 acres (73 ha) under pineapples in Queensland, mostly near Brisbane.

Maroochy developed as a region of small farms, and by the mid-1880s the region had 116 people employed in mixed farming, 70 in sugar, 52 in timber, and only 15 in grazing. The Maroochy Divisional Board was created in 1890 (becoming the Maroochy Shire in 1902), and would develop into Queensland's largest fruit growing area between the 1880s and 1915, thanks to its climate and rainfall, with bananas being grown from the 1880s, and pineapples from the 1890s. It was possible for small farmers to make a living out of pineapples as thousands of plants could be cultivated in each acre. Other crops grown in the Maroochy Shire included coffee, ginger, strawberries and citrus. Dairy farming also played an important part in the local economy from the 1890s.

The fruit industry in the Maroochy Shire was stimulated when the North Coast Railway was constructed northwards from Brisbane after 1886. The railway reached Woombye in 1890, and met the line from Gympie at Cooroy in July 1891. By 1900, the Blackall Range was a successful fruit growing area, and in 1901, Woombye was promoted as the fruit growing area in Queensland with the greatest potential. Around this time pineapples were overtaking citrus as the crop of choice in the area, especially at Woombye, with its well-drained soil and rolling hills. In 1914, the Brisbane district still produced most of Queensland's pineapples, while rising pineapple districts included the North Coast Line (North Pine to Gympie), the Tiaro and Mount Bauple district, Maryborough, and the Pialba district.

In 1916, unused Crown Land near Beerburrum's railway siding was surveyed into portions for returned soldiers to grow pineapples. Some land at Woombye and Palmwoods was also resumed under the Soldier Settlement scheme. Beerburrum Soldier Settlement was the largest soldier settlement area in Australia by 1921, but it had failed by 1932, and helped to produce a glut of pineapples in the process. Queensland production of pineapples doubled between 1932 and 1942, and doubled again between 1952 and 1956, to a total of 12,316 acres (4,984 ha) by the latter date.

In 1947, the Northgate Committee of Direction of Fruit Marketing Cannery (later Golden Circle), owned and controlled by growers, began operations. Although pineapples boomed in the post war period, marketing issues led to the first Golden Pineapple Week in 1955, along with Miss Golden Pineapple, to promote Maroochy pineapples. In the mid-1950s, the vast majority of Queensland's pineapple growers were in South East Queensland, and two thirds of South East Queensland's production came from three main zones: the Palmwoods-Woombye-Nambour area, the Mary Valley, and the Glasshouse Mountains-Beerwah area.

In South East Queensland in the financial year from 1955 to 1956 the larger pineapple growers (those producing over 2,500 cases per year) grew a smaller percentage of the region's total crop than in Central Queensland. Large producers also grew less of the crop around Palmwoods than in the Mary Valley and Glasshouse areas, which reflected the trend towards small farms in the Maroochy Shire. The average South East Queensland pineapple grower had 10.6 acres (4.3 ha) under pineapples, on a 109-acre farm, and of the top six South East Queensland production areas, Woombye and Palmwoods had the smallest average farm sizes, with the greatest percentage of the farm used for pineapples. In the mid-1950s Woombye ranked third of the top six South East Queensland areas by number of growers, and second of the top six South East Queensland areas by production. In the 1970s, pineapples were Maroochy's third largest agricultural industry after sugar and dairy farming.

Meanwhile, changes were taking place in Australian culture that would impact on tourism. After World War II the use of cars increased, and during the 1950s Australia was second only to the United States in car ownership per head of population. More car travel also led to more garages and fuel stops, and motels and caravan parks were built to accommodate those families taking to the roads for their ever-lengthening holidays. Annual leave increased from one week in 1941 to two weeks in 1945, three weeks in 1963 and four weeks in 1974. Roads were improved, and access was opened up to previously isolated natural attractions. The Bruce Highway was finally surfaced with bitumen all the way from Brisbane to Cairns by 1962, and the Pacific Highway was fully surfaced with bitumen by the late 1960s, which helped bring more New South Wales tourists north into Queensland.

In the Maroochy Shire, the immediate post war period saw a shift in emphasis from traditional agricultural pursuits to coastal tourism. This shift was marked by David Low's election as Maroochy shire chairman in 1952 on a tourism platform. The late 1950s witnessed the first use of terms "Sunshine Coast" and "Gold Coast" to market Queensland's beach culture, and by 1960 the Queensland Government Tourist Bureau was promoting "The Sunshine State" as a nickname for Queensland.

Development on the Sunshine Coast was less intense than on the Gold Coast, and until the 1960s development remained low-key and family oriented, dominated by foreshore and riverside camping grounds, and flats and motels. In many parts of the Sunshine Coast there was a conscious reaction against the style of development that had taken place on the Gold Coast. Like the Gold Coast, on the Sunshine Coast the seaside entertainments of an earlier era have evolved into large scale tourist attractions. However these have developed in a style that is characteristic of the Sunshine Coast hinterland. Here, the focus has been on education and the agricultural heritage and ecology of the region. Attractions besides the Big Pineapple have included: the Big Cow; the Buderim Ginger Factory at Buderim which was later relocated to Yandina, Australia Zoo, Forest Glen Deer Park, and the Superbee.

Related to tourism developments is the advertising phenomenon of the Big Thing. Big Things were used in California from the 1920s to lure customers off the highways to stop at food stalls, and they first appeared in Australia in the 1960s. The earliest Australian Big Things included:

- the Big Scotsman, advertising a motel in Adelaide (1963)
- the Big Banana, promoting a roadside banana stall at Coff's Harbour (1964)
- the Big Stubby, a bottle museum at Tewantin (1966).

Big Things were usually built by entrepreneurs or by the local community, and almost all featured something that the town or district was famous for, usually flora or produce. Steel framing and fibreglass appear to be the most common building materials.

=== Establishment of the Sunshine Plantation ===
It was within this context of pineapples, tourism, and Big Things that Taylor Family Investments Pty Ltd purchased a 23 hectares (57 acres) pineapple farm southeast of Woombye in January 1971, from Gordon Ollett. Bill Taylor had worked at the United Nations for 20 years and had been head of the Development Finance Section, and Lyn Taylor was an interior designer in New York City. They returned to Australia in 1970. In 1971, Bill and Lyn Taylor embarked on what was then a new concept in agri-tourism, using Maroochy's agricultural heritage to attract tourists. The pineapple farm became an agri-tourism project showcasing over 40 varieties of fruits, nuts, spices, and sugar cane: the Sunshine Plantation. The Maroochy Shire Council and the Queensland Government supported the venture, and, on 15 August 1971, the plantation was opened by the State Minister for Labour and Tourism, John Herbert. Mr Herbert claimed that the attraction was unique for the Queensland tourist industry, combining the specific promotion of tourism with the promotion of the area and its tropical production as a whole. A 1980 promotional booklet for the Sunshine Plantation claimed that in 1971 the concept and design was original and unique in the world.

At the opening the Maroochy Shire Council chairman, Eddie de Vere, drove a gold spike into the Plantation Train Ride, a one kilometre two-foot gauge track which still has the steepest incline and sharpest bend of any Queensland passenger rail track. A crane placed the leaves on top of the 16-metre (52 ft) steel-framed fibreglass Big Pineapple that became the symbol of the plantation. Lyn Taylor was responsible for much of the design and layout of the project. The Big Pineapple could be entered, and its interior included a curved staircase, along with an audiovisual story about the pineapple industry and other tropical fruits. Local agricultural producers and co-operatives participated in the development of the displays, most notably the Golden Circle Cannery. A shop and restaurant building was located just north of the Big Pineapple structure, and a cottage was located nearby.

The capacity of the facilities was tested from the opening, and modest expansions of the restaurant, market, and sugar cane train occurred in the early years of operation. One product which proved popular was the range of tropical fruit jams which were made on site. In 1972, demand for these jams outgrew the production kitchen and the Taylors entered into a joint venture with local passionfruit farmers Bill and Noelene Hughes to form Sunshine Tropical Fruit Products.

The Sunshine Plantation provided visitors with an opportunity to learn about the growing, production and consumption of various tropical agricultural products, and a 1978 information booklet stated that the crops grown at the plantation were representative of over half the agricultural production in Queensland. A central feature of the attraction continues to be the sugar cane train which takes visitors on a guided educational tour of the plantation. In the Big Pineapple structure, visitors see displays and gain an understanding of the production and processing of various tropical fruits, nuts, and cane; in the restaurant, visitors can sample various fresh tropical fruits, and in the market they can purchase fresh fruit and fruit jams.

Authenticity was demonstrated by the plantation being a working farm, and by its links to and partnerships with local grower co-operatives, industry associations and significant institutions such as the Moreton Central Sugar Mill, the Golden Circle Cannery, the Committee of Direction of Fruit Marketing (COD), the Sugar Board, CSR limited, Buderim Ginger Factory, and the Australian Macadamia Nut Society.

The Big Pineapple was soon followed by other Big Things in the area. In October 1971, another 16-metre (52 ft) high pineapple was opened, this time at a Gympie service station, by the Queensland Director General of Tourist Services, John Wilson (Gympie's pineapple was demolished in 2008). In 1976, a Big Cow was built north of Nambour for a farm park.

As acknowledgement of the Taylors' achievements, on 12 March 1972, the Australian National Travel Association presented the Sunshine Plantation with the first annual award for tourist development in Queensland. In 1982, the Taylors were invited to build a similar project in Hawaii, and in 1984, they developed and operated the "Hawaii Tropical Plantation" in partnership with two Hawaiian companies.

The Sunshine Plantation expanded in 1976 when Taylor Family Investments Pty Ltd purchased eight hectares of land from Keith and Ailsa Heinrich, to the west of the original attraction.

At 3am on 11 September 1978, an early morning fire completely destroyed the building which housed the tropical market and restaurant next to the Big Pineapple, following an attempted burglary. However, two months later on 19 December, the Governor General, Sir Zelman Cowan, opened a new Tropical Village complex, which now had a separate restaurant building to the north of the rebuilt retail building. In February 1979, the 10.2 hectares (25 acres) future site of the Nut Factory and the Big Macadamia was purchased from the Heinrichs by Sunshine Land Nominees Pty Limited. Part of this land was leased to CSR Limited in 1979, and the lease was later transferred to Macadamia Nuts Pty Ltd. By 1980, the Sunshine Plantation included the newly opened Macadamia Nut Factory, operated by CSR Limited, and the Nutmobile tour.

By 1980, visitors could shop in the Tropical market, and eat in the two storey Tropical Restaurant. The top floor was known as the Polynesian Restaurant, with bamboo ceiling lining and thatched counter decorations, and the bottom floor was the Hibiscus Room. The Nutmobile tour started just north of the restaurant building and ran westwards to the Macadamia Nut Factory, the largest in Australia, where tourists could view displays, observe the sorting room, or buy macadamia products. At this time, there was a large carpark on the site of the present Tomorrow's Harvest greenhouse. Starting to the east of the market building, the train tour travelled past a variety of tropical crops, including:

- pineapples, avocados, exotic fruits, nuts, tea, coffee, and ginger
- sugar cane (by the rainforest on the eastern side of plantation)
- papaws, bananas, and passionfruit

Within the train track was the Children's Farm (with the current mansard-roofed barn) and Animal Nursery. A tunnel under the train track led to a rainforest walk.

In its first 10 years, the Sunshine Plantation grew in popularity with attendance of 250,000 visitors in 1972 to over 1,000,000 in 1980. During the 1980s, a number of changes occurred. In 1981, the Taylor's sold the Sunshine Plantation to Lanray Holdings, although the titles for their 1971 and 1976 land purchases remained under the name of Taylor Family Investment Pty Ltd until August 1993, when Sunshine Securities Pty Ltd became the registered proprietors. A lower retail area for the market building was opened in 1982, and in 1984, the Nutcountry Tour was extended to include a section of rainforest. That same year verandahs were added to complement the upstairs restaurant (now called Sunshines Restaurant); Troppo's Restaurant (later the Plantation Restaurant) was opened downstairs, and Queensland's Hidden Treasures was opened to display Queensland gems and minerals. In 1985, by which time tourism had overtaken sugar as Maroochy's biggest industry, Queensland Press Limited became the new owner.

Meanwhile, in 1983, the then Prince of Wales (now King Charles III) and his then wife, Diana, Princess of Wales, visited the Plantation and rode on the train during their official visit to Australia.

In 1986, more properties were purchased, including land south of the current Nambour Connection Road. 1987 saw land purchased on the southern side of the highway, which allowed the construction of new car parking facilities, accommodating a further 20 coaches and 420 cars. A pedestrian bridge was constructed to span the highway. Also in 1987 the Sunshines Restaurant was doubled in size (the restaurant building seems to have been expanded to the west), and a new reception area and Tourist Information Centre was added. The Big Pineapple structure was refurbished and moved about 15 metres (49 ft) east at this time. There are indications that the Big Pineapple's skin was also replaced. 1988 witnessed the construction of the Tomorrow's Harvest hydroponics farm, a large greenhouse which displayed innovative technology, and RAPS Night Time family restaurant opened in June that year. In 1989, the 16-metre (52 ft) high Big Macadamia, known as the Magic Macadamia was opened. From 2000, the Big Macadamia housed the Rainforest Creatures of the Night display, but by mid-2007, this attraction was closed, as was the Tomorrow's Harvest greenhouse. The original Macadamia Nut Factory is no longer open to visitors, although the current Nutmobile Tour passes by a more recent factory building further to the north.

In 1990, the Bruce Highway was realigned, bypassing the Big Pineapple along with Woombye and Nambour, but the tourist attraction continued to attract the public, and it was upgraded further during the 1990s. In 1991, a mini tornado damaged the Tomorrow's Harvest attraction, closing it for seven weeks while temporary repairs were effected. In December 1991, the Rainforest train stop was opened, adding rainforest walks and the animal nursery to the Train tour. In 1992, an Arts and Crafts Gallery opened in the lower retail area beside the train station and the expansion of the leisurewear department. In 1993, the tornedo-damaged roof of Tomorrow's Harvest was replaced, Plantations Restaurant received a colonial-themed makeover, and punkahs (mechanical fans) were added to the upstairs retail area. During 1994 Sunshines Restaurant was refurbished, and the servery counters were rebuilt. However, RAPS restaurant closed in September that year. The Farm Show was added to the Train Tour in September 1995, and guided tours of the Macadamia Nut Factory, when it was not processing, started in December. Roughend Pineapple Party Ltd became the new owner of the complex in July 1996, and a Wildlife Garden featuring koalas and other Australian native animals had opened in April that year.

The 'Bromeliad Feature' was added to the Tomorrow's Harvest attraction in February 1996. The 'Wildlife Garden' featuring koalas and other native animals was opened in April. Roughend Pineapple became the new owner of Sunshine Plantation in July.

In 2006, the Big Pineapple was one of 12 Queensland icons, including the Cane Toad, Macadamia Nuts, and the Great Barrier Reef, selected from nominations received by the National Trust of Queensland. Another 24 icons had been selected between 2004 and 2005. According to the National Trust of Queensland, the items selected "inherently represent an important part of our history or will have contributed to our cultural identity and will have won a lasting place in our minds and memories." In June 2007, Australia Post issued five stamps celebrating Australia's Big Things, and the Big Pineapple was one of the five Big Things selected - along with the Big Golden Guitar at Tamworth, the Big Banana at Coffs Harbour, and the Big Merino at Goulburn (all in New South Wales), and the Big Lobster at Kingston SE (South Australia).

=== Closure and re-opening ===
The Big Pineapple attraction went into receivership in 2009 and was closed in October 2010. The Nutmobile was sold in July 2011 to the Bromet family, to promote macadamia nuts and tourism at the town of Bauple. In late August 2011, the Big Pineapple complex and its surrounding farmland was sold to a consortium that has maintained it as a tourism attraction and market hub for Queensland produce, following extensive repair of the visitor area.

In April 2013, the first Big Pineapple Music Festival was held with Birds of Tokyo headlining the event. The Festival has steadily grown in profile and popularity, and is regularly sold out. The Music Festival is now an event of national standing, having been awarded as one of Australia's top regional music festivals.

In 2017, the owners demonstrated their intent to facilitate a positive future through announcements about planning to include new attractions, supported by community consultation.

Following economic assessments, the owners announced that they saw potential in facilitating a range of new uses that complemented the heritage and qualities of the site. They suggested there was strong potential for the future delivery of a family fun park, a travel centre, food-based tourism, an eco-tourism destination with walking trails, outdoor sport and recreation, educational facilities, health and wellbeing services, along with tourist accommodation such as a holiday recreational vehicle park and glamping sites.

In 2017, the new owners explained that they intended to restore the popularity of the site to increase tourism, but not to directly replicate the previous experience such as in the heyday of the 1980s.

As of 2017, the Big Pineapple features the heritage-listed Big Pineapple visitor area, the Wildlife HQ zoo, along with the popular Big Pineapple Music Festival and other events. Visitors are able to climb the Pineapple. While visitation is lower than in the heyday in the 1970s and 1980s when it was among the most popular tourist attractions in Australia and featured a royal visit, interest in the Big Pineapple is still strong. The Big Pineapple was rated as one of Australia's most popular destinations for selfies, and the on-site cafe does a good trade in retro merchandise.

As at early 2017, the Big Pineapple was still updating attractions, with the popular music festival continuing well, with the new owners also undertaking whole of site master planning and community consultation.

In February 2017, the Big Pineapple was selected to host a Midnight Oil concert, as part of a reunion tour which took place in October 2017, seen by promoters as linking two Aussie 1980s icons.

As of March 2019, the Big Pineapple hosts the TreeTop Challenge, the highest ropes course in Australia.

In September 2020, the sugar cane train was taken out of service for repairs. In May 2021, the train was removed without permission from its storage tunnel, taken for a spin on the train line, and derailed. A 22-year-old suspected brewery tour patron was charged with dangerous operation of a vehicle, and later ordered to pay for the damage to the train system. Meanwhile, Big Pineapple workers refurbished the locomotive, and also replaced 700 sleepers and the 250 m (820 ft) of track damaged by the vandal. The train system was reopened in 2024.

== Description ==
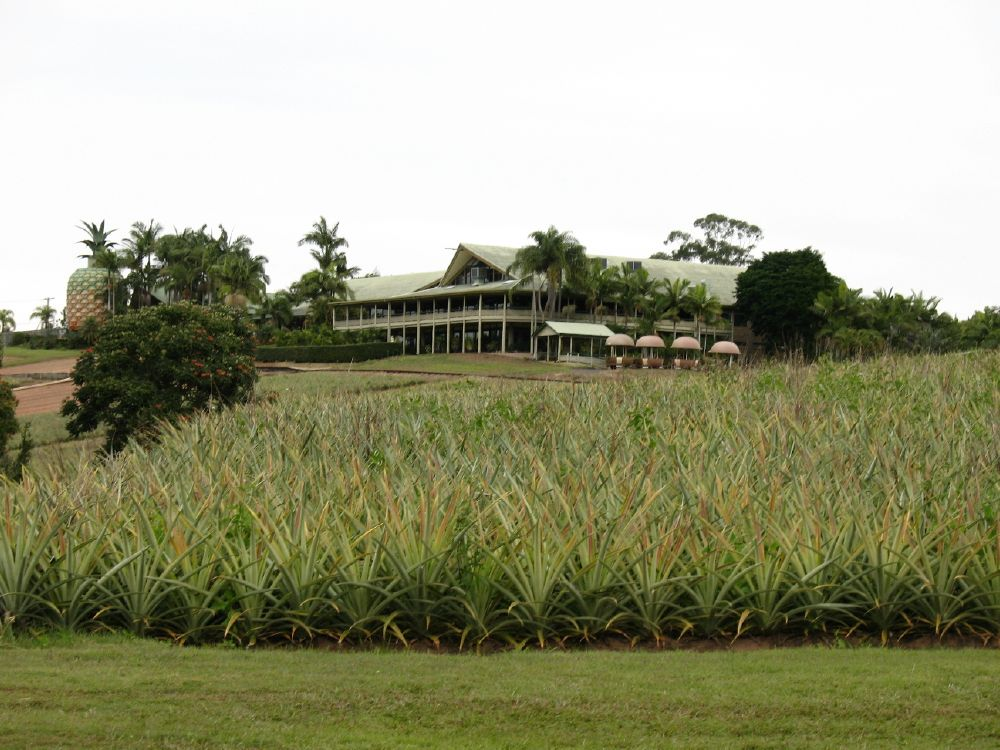
Looking south from train ride towards the restaurant, 2007

The Big Pineapple complex is located on the rise of a hill on the northern side of the Nambour Connection Road at Woombye. The original Sunshine Plantation area (the Big Macadamia and the Nut Factory are not included within the heritage boundary) comprises approximately 22.86 hectares (56.5 acres) of pineapple plantations, sub-tropical rainforests and orchards. Major structures on the site include a replica pineapple (the Big Pineapple), an entrance pavilion and two large, two-storey restaurant and retail buildings, with a cottage to the west. Associated structures to the east include tram tracks, two tour stations, and a ticket office for the plantation train; a machinery shed, an animal nursery, a lagoon, and a koala enclosure. There is also a Nutmobile/Rainforest Tour station to the north of the restaurant building.

The Big Pineapple structure and retail and restaurant buildings are strikingly visible from the approach road from the east. The entrance to the plantation, the Big Pineapple and the main buildings are located at the top of the hill and overlook the pineapple plantation, animal nursery and wild fowl lagoon. The entrance pavilion is an open gabled pavilion over framed with round timber poles and houses the entrance ticket booth and information centre. It has a corrugated iron roof.

=== Big Pineapple Structure ===
The Big Pineapple, adjacent to the entrance pavilion, is a hollow structure, 16 metres (52 ft) in height and cylindrical in shape. The shell of the main body is formed in fibreglass supported internally on a steel frame. The fibreglass has been moulded to replicate the skin texture and colour of a pineapple and has been formed in several pieces which are rivet-fixed together. The stalk of the pineapple and the surrounding viewing platform are formed in steel which has been painted.

Internally, the shell of the Big Pineapple is unlined and the texture of the moulding is visible on the inside. It is divided into two levels for the purpose of exhibiting displays and for accessing the viewing platform above. Each floor is supported on exposed round steel posts which are painted. A central steel post extends up through the structure to provide additional support to the two floor levels and to support the viewing platform and the stalk of the pineapple above.

The first level is accessed via external steps. The ceiling and central core are lined with fibre-cement which has been painted to resemble the flesh of a pineapple. The floor is lined with linoleum tiles. The second floor is accessed via an open-riser, curved staircase with steel stringers, unpainted timber treads and a curved steel balustrade.

The second floor is similar to the first with exposed steel posts supporting the viewing platform above and a linoleum-tiled floor. The central steel post is encased behind a display and the ceiling is lined with fibre-cement and flat timber cover strips fan out from the central post. The viewing platform is accessed from this level via an angled two-flight staircase. It has steel stringers, timber treads and a steel balustrade. The viewing platform sits within the uppermost part of the pineapple shell and wraps around the stalk of the pineapple which is visible overhead. It is lined with painted sheet metal and has a spray-aggregate finish to the platform deck.

Perspex-encased displays of tropical fruit and the pineapple manufacturing process dating from 1971 are arranged within the Big Pineapple. On each of the two floors, there is a hand-painted landscape diorama of pineapple plantations with model factories, trucks and cane trains. Display cases of model pineapples are also located on the perimeter walls on the stairs between level one and two. On level two, there is an arrangement of Golden Circle Cannery products including cans of pineapple pieces and bottles of cordial and fruit juice. Early photographs of aspects of the tropical fruit manufacturing process and formal photographs of past employees are also on display. A painted steel ring beam which supports the pineapple shell is visible behind the displays.

=== Retail and restaurant buildings ===
Turnstiles lead from the ticket booth to the restaurant and retail buildings, which display Polynesian architectural influences. The retail building to the south is sited at a right angle to the larger restaurant building beyond. Both have concrete-tiled, hipped roofs with gablets infilled with glazing at each end. Both are two-storeyed and have deep overhangs and verandahs on the eastern side with the restaurant building's verandah returning on the northern side. The upper floors are suspended concrete slabs and steel portal frames support the roof.

Walls to the east on the retail building are glazed with fibre-cement infills to the lower half. The veranda has a tiled suspended concrete floor, brick balustrades, and timber rafters supported on blockwork piers. On the lower level, the piers are round concrete and walls are infilled full-height glazing and painted blockwork.

Walls to both the upper and lower levels to the restaurant building are infilled with full-height glazing and blockwork. The veranda to the restaurant building has a timber-framed floor supported by round timber posts and timber lattice balustrades.

The two buildings are linked with a low-pitched gabled roof with translucent sheeting. Amenities and some service areas are located in this area. External concrete stairs lead from the upper floor towards the train station.

Internally, the first floor of the retail building is on open space with the steel portal frame exposed to the inside. Ceilings and columns are lined with bamboo and the floor is tiled with linoleum. Various retail counters and souvenir displays are set out within the space. Two painted aluminium air conditioning ducts run along the length of ceiling aside a suspended motorised fan system (a punkah). Pendant lights and fluorescent tubes hang from the ceiling. A central staircase leads to the lower level which was inaccessible at the time of assessment.

The interior of the restaurant building is an open space similar to the retail building but larger in scale. The steel portal frame is exposed on the inside and ceilings are lined with bamboo. The northern side of the space has been fitted with servery counters and kitchen rooms. The floor is lined with carpet. The steel columns are lined with plasterboard and painted. Air conditioning vents, ceiling fans, and pendant lights are suspended from the ceiling.

=== Plantation train ===
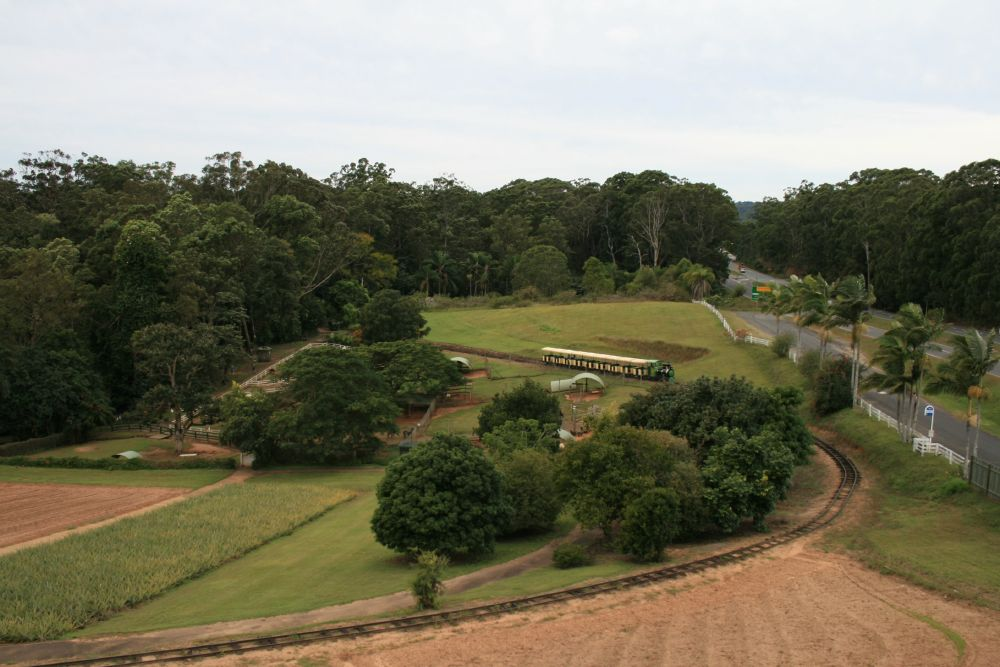
View from the top of the Big Pineapple towards the train ride, 2007

To the east of the main buildings is the plantation railway ticket office and paved, concrete access platform to the plantation train. A ramp leads from the concrete station platform through painted metal exit gates punched through with the big pineapple logo. The train, painted with the name Sugar Cane Train No.4, has variously been described as a former sugar cane train, or as a former quarry engine. The track gauge is two foot gauge which runs through a railway station/machinery shed and form a circuit around the pineapple plantation, the orchard, wild fowl lagoon, and animal nursery. The koala sanctuary and rainforest walk lie to the east of the circuit. Along the eastern side of the train circuit the land becomes steeper and a low, random rubble wall retains the slope beside the track.

=== Pineapple Plantation ===
The pineapple plantation lies on a north-east facing slope within the train circuit. The pineapple crop is cultivated in rows of raised beds following the lie of the land.

=== Machinery shed/railway station ===
The train tracks lead from the platform down a slope to the simulated old-style railway station (not one of the official stops) and machinery shed. This is a brick building with a low pitched gable roof sheeted with corrugated iron. It has two curved openings, one for the train to access the railway station and the other for road vehicles and machinery.

=== The Orchard ===
Beyond the train station/machinery shed is the orchard which lies inside the train circuit on a north-facing slope. Fruit trees grown in the orchard include star apple, custard apple, miracle fruit and varieties of citrus trees.

=== Nutmobile/Rainforest station ===
The Nutmobile/rainforest station is located to the north of the restaurant building. It is an open, timber-framed pavilion with round posts and a gabled, corrugated iron-clad roof.

=== Fencing ===
The Big Pineapple complex is partly fenced to the south boundary with a timber-framed flat-top paling fence and a low three-rail fence to the east which is painted white. A bitumen car park fronts the entrance pavilion area which is paved in terracotta-coloured pavers.

== Heritage listing ==
The Big Pineapple was listed on the Queensland Heritage Register on 6 March 2009 having satisfied the following criteria.

The place is important in demonstrating the evolution or pattern of Queensland's history.

The Big Pineapple complex, including the iconic Big Pineapple structure and associated tramway, train, nut mobile, attractions, activities, plantations and buildings, is important in demonstrating the development of agri-tourism and roadside attractions in Queensland.

The establishment of the Sunshine Plantation and its continued operation as the Big Pineapple combines the operation of a tourist attraction and the promotion of tourism in the Sunshine Coast with the promotion of the area's tropical fruit production. The uniqueness of the project was well documented in the contemporary local press and other promotional and tourist material as well as in the newsletters and annual reports of various agricultural industry associations.

The working plantation sections of the complex provide visitors with an opportunity to learn about the growing of various tropical agricultural products in Queensland, especially pineapples and sugar cane, which used to be the predominant agricultural crops in the area.

In addition, the complex reflects a response to the increased use of motor cars for family holidays in Australia since World War II and the associated development of tourist attractions to cater for this. Important in accommodating one of the earliest "Big Things", the complex also reflects the growth of the phenomenon of the Big Thing as a tourist attraction and destination in Australian tourism.

The place is important in demonstrating the principal characteristics of a particular class of cultural places.

The Big Pineapple complex is important in demonstrating the characteristics of an agri-tourism attraction combining the entertainment of tourists with the promotion of the features, facilities and industries of the region.

The complex includes a landmark “Big Thing” that combines education exhibits with retail and leisure facilities. It has developed plantings of different fruits, nuts, spices and sugar cane, to demonstrate tropical agriculture. From vantage points around the main building, the plantation layout provides sweeping views of the region’s varied crops.

The Big Pineapple structure is important in demonstrating the principal characteristics of an outdoor cultural object or "Big Thing" in its fabric and setting. Big Things represent flora or fauna, are larger-than-life size, are constructed from materials like fibreglass and steel, are associated with a tourist attraction and occupy a roadside location to entice tourists to visit the attraction. Big Things often advertise the produce of the area in which they are located, and the Big Pineapple is located on a working pineapple farm, in a region were the pineapple industry once predominated. This authenticity contributes to its enduring appeal.

As one of Queensland's first Big Things, the Big Pineapple structure is generally intact and retains its interior displays, internal staircase and distinctive fibre-glass shell. The associated retail and restaurant buildings and the plantation setting remain.

The place is important because of its aesthetic significance.

Positioned on the crest of a hill overlooking the motorway, the Big Pineapple structure is important as a landmark, strikingly visible to passing traffic and provides sweeping views of the surrounding landscape. Within the Big Pineapple complex, the plantation's sloping terrain, rainforest, and selection of crops provide pleasing vistas for visitors as they tour the place.

The place has a strong or special association with a particular community or cultural group for social, cultural or spiritual reasons.

Through representation in tourist guides and brochures, the Big Pineapple complex is an identifiable and recognised place, both nationally and internationally. The Big Pineapple tourist attraction has an association with tourists who have taken road trips on the old Bruce Highway and have stopped at the tourist attraction.

The Sunshine Plantation also attracted support from the local community, and had close associations with key regional and state agricultural industry associations.

The Big Pineapple structure has iconic and landmark status as one of Australia's most well-known Big Things. Its most recent recognition is inclusion in a special stamp issue of Big Things by Australia Post.

== Awards ==
In 2009, as part of the Q150 celebrations, the Big Pineapple was announced as one of the Q150 Icons of Queensland for its role as a "location".

== Big Things in Australia ==
Lists of Big Things around Australia vary regarding the number of objects in each state, and what is included, but a 2004 book on the subject listed 118 Big Things, or groups of Big Things, in Australia, with Queensland having the most at 41, followed by New South Wales with 32. Of Queensland's Big Things, 23 were purely private commercial efforts - advertising shops, service stations, motels and caravan parks, restaurants, museums and the like - and six others were aimed at drawing people to a private tourist attraction. Eight places were structures that could be entered, including the Big Pineapple and the Big Macadamia at the Big Pineapple complex.

== See also ==
- Australia's Big Things
- List of tramways in Queensland
