= Benjamin Stewart (musician) =

Australian musician

- Occupations: Singer; songwriter
- Instruments: Vocals, guitar
- Years active: 2015-present

Benjamin Stewart is an Australian musician and lead singer of the band Slowly Slowly.

In 2024, Stewart released his debut album Pushing Daylight. He currently lives in Reservoir, Victoria.

== Early life ==
Stewart grew up in Croydon, Victoria and spent a lot of time with his grandparents in Reservoir, Victoria. He said, growing up, he was exposed to music of Michael Jackson, The Beatles, The Bee Gees, Lionel Richie as well as Backstreet Boys, NSYNC and Five.

== Career ==
=== 2015–present: Slowly Slowly ===
In 2015, Stewart, alongside Albert Doan, Patrick Murphy and Alex Quayle created the band Slowly Slowly, releasing their debut album in 2016 and have achieved three ARIA top ten albums through to 2025.

=== 2024–present: Solo career ===
In April 2024, Stewart released his debut solo album Pushing Daylight, which peaked at number 56 on the ARIA Charts. In December 2025, Stewart released a second album Junkdrawers which peaked at number 47 on the ARIA Charts.

== Discography ==
=== Albums ===
List of albums, with release date and label shown
Title	Details	Peak chart positions
Title	Details	AUS
Pushing Daylight	Released: 12 April 2024; Label: Benjamin Stewart (BEN-01); Formats: LP, digital download, streaming	56
Junkdrawers	Released: 12 December 2025; Label: Benjamin Stewart (BEN-02); Formats: LP, digital download, streaming	48

== Awards and nominations ==
=== AIR Awards ===
The Australian Independent Record Awards (commonly known informally as AIR Awards) is an annual awards night to recognise, promote and celebrate the success of Australia's Independent Music sector.

Year	Nominee / work	Award	Result	Ref.
2026	Benjamin Stewart for Slowly Slowly - Forgiving Spree	Independent Producer of the Year	Nominated	

=== APRA Awards ===
The APRA Awards are held in Australia and New Zealand by the Australasian Performing Right Association to recognise songwriting skills, sales and airplay performance by its members annually.

Year	Nominee / work	Award	Result	Ref.
2020	"Jellyfish" by Slowly Slowly (Ben Stewart)	Most Performed Rock Work of the Year	Nominated	
