= In a Restless House =

Studio album by City Calm Down
- Released: 6 November 2015
- Recorded: 2015
- Studio: Soundpark Studios
- Genre: Indie rock, alternative rock, new wave
- Length: 43:00
- Label: I Oh You
- Producer: Malcolm Besley

City Calm Down chronology
| Moments (EP) (2012) | In a Restless House (2015) |

In a Restless House is the debut album of the alternative rock band, City Calm Down. It was released on 6 November 2015, through I Oh You. Two singles were released "Rabbit Run" and "Son". The album was released on CD and 12" Vinyl. The band promoted the album on two Australian tours in October 2015 and April 2016. They also promoted the album with a short six-date tour in England, including a performance at the Brighton Festival.

== Critical reception ==
The album debuted at 25 on the ARIA Charts. The album was praised with much positive feedback. It became Triple J's featured album of the week, also having several songs from the album having some airplay. It was praised by Rolling Stone – "Introspection and elation still tussle, but self-assuredness is what marks this impressive rebirth". Their single "Rabbit Run" was also voted in the Triple J Hottest 100 and came 137th place. Their song "Your Fix" features in the 2017 video game, AFL Evolution.

== Track listing ==
All tracks are written by Jack Bourke, Jeremy Sonnenberg, Lee O. Armstrong and Samuel Mullaly

| No. | Title | Length |
|---|---|---|
| 1. | "Intro" | 1:52 |
| 2. | "Border On Control" | 4:26 |
| 3. | "Son" | 4:21 |
| 4. | "Rabbit Run" | 4:08 |
| 5. | "Wandering" | 4:33 |
| 6. | "Your Fix" | 3:42 |
| 7. | "Nowhere to Start" | 2:50 |
| 8. | "If There's a Light On" | 5:22 |
| 9. | "Falling" | 4:36 |
| 10. | "Until I Get By" | 4:34 |
| 11. | "In a Restless House" | 3:57 |

== Personnel ==
Adapted from Discogs.

Musicians

- Jack Bourke – vocals
- Samuel Mullaly – synth
- Jeremy Sonnenberg – bass
- Lee Armstrong – drums
- Patrick Santamaria – additional guitar (tracks 3, 4, 6, 8, 9)
- Alex Howroyd – horns (tracks 3, 6, 7, 10)
- Andrew Werner – horns (tracks 3, 6, 7, 10)
- Greg Spence – horns (tracks 3, 6, 7, 10)
- Kerri Harvey – backing vocals (tracks 3, 7)
- Zachary Hamilton-Reeves – backing vocals (track 3)

Production

- Malcolm Besley – production, mixing, recording
- Steve Smart – mastering

Artwork

- Gordon Sonnenberg – cover illustration
- Samuel Mullaly – artwork design and layout

== Charts ==
| Chart (2015) | Peak position |
|---|---|
| Australian Albums (ARIA) | 25 |
