= Race Car Blues =

Studio album by Slowly Slowly
- Released: 28 February 2020
- Recorded: 2019
- Length: 43:33
- Label: UNFD
- Producer: Matt Quayle

Slowly Slowly chronology
St Leonard's (2018)	Race Car Blues (2020)	Race Car Blues Chapter Two (2021)

Race Car Blues is the third studio album by Australian rock band Slowly Slowly, released through UNFD on 28 February 2020.

The album debuted and peaked at number seven on the ARIA Albums Chart.

At the AIR Awards of 2021, the album was nominated for Best Independent Rock Album or EP.

== Background ==
Race Car Blues features the previously released tracks "Jellyfish", "Creature of Habit Pt.2", "Safety Switch", "Low", title track "Race Car Blues" and "19", and was recorded throughout 2019 at Salt Studios in Melbourne. The album was engineered by the band's bass guitarist Alex Quayle.

== Release and promotion ==
Race Car Blues was released by UNFD on 28 February 2020, as digital download, CD, and LP formats.

== Track listing ==
All tracks are written and performed by Slowly Slowly, except "Safety Switch" which is also performed by Bec Stevens.

Race Car Blues track listing
No.	Title	Length
1.	"Creature of Habit"	3:11
2.	"19"	3:24
3.	"Safety Switch"	2:50
4.	"You Are Bigger Than This Town"	3:22
5.	"Michael Angelo"	3:38
6.	"Soil"	3:18
7.	"Suicidal Evangelist"	4:00
8.	"Jellyfish"	3:16
9.	"How It Feels"	4:17
10.	"Superpowers"	3:56
11.	"Creature of Habit Pt.2"	3:25
12.	"Race Car Blues"	3:56
Total length:		43:33

== Personnel ==
=== Musicians ===
- Ben Stewart – writing, lead vocals and guitar (1–11)
- Patrick Murphy – writing, drums (1–11)
- Albert Doan – writing, guitar (1–11)
- Alex Quayle – writing, bass (1–11)

Other musicians

- Bec Stevens – vocals (3)

=== Technical ===
- Alex Quayle – engineering (1–11)

== Charts ==
Chart performance for Race Car Blues
Chart (2020)	Peak position
Australian Albums (ARIA)	7

== Tour ==
Slowly Slowly announced a tour in support of the album on 28 January 2020, with dates across Australia throughout April and May 2020. This was later confirmed to include appearances at the now-cancelled Groovin the Moo 2020 festival.

Due to the COVID-19 pandemic, the band announced on 19 March 2020 that the tour had been postponed, with their headline shows changed to occur in October and November 2020. The rescheduled dates include appearances in Brisbane, Sydney, Melbourne, Hobart, Launceston, Perth and Adelaide. Groovin the Moo was cancelled.

Slowly Slowly Race Car Blues 2020 Tour
Original date	New date	City	Venue
Friday 17 April	Friday 9 October	Sydney	Manning Bar
Saturday 18 April	Thursday 8 October	Brisbane	The Triffid
Friday 15 May	Sunday 11 October	Melbourne	170 Russell
Sunday 17 May	Friday 16 October	Melbourne	170 Russell
Friday 22 May	Friday 6 November	Perth	Badlands Bar
Friday 29 May	Friday 30 October	Hobart	Altar
Saturday 30 May	Saturday 31 October	Launceston	Saloon Bar
N/A	Saturday 7 November	Adelaide	Lion Arts Factory
