= Rakeem Miles =

American rapper

- Born: Rakeem Tyree Miles; March 12, 1993 (age 33); Baltimore, Maryland, United States
- Other name: Action Figure Miles
- Occupations: Rapper; singer; songwriter; record producer; actor
- Years active: 2008–present
- Musical career
- Genres: Hip hop; trip hop; alternative hip hop
- Instrument: Vocals
- Labels: Empire Distribution; Imperial Music Group; OG Tribe (former)
- Website: rakeemmiles.com

Rakeem Tyree Miles (born March 12, 1993) is an American rapper, singer, songwriter, artist and record producer from Baltimore, Maryland. Miles self-proclaims his own sound of "Alternative Hip Hop". He is one of the founding members of Hip-Hop collective group Organic Geniuses, which disbanded in 2017. Miles is also the founder of Weird n Awful Music Festival, an annual event to which he's curated headlining acts such as Left Brain, Mike G of Odd Future, A$AP Ant of A$AP Mob and recently with Waka Flocka Flame.

== Early life ==
As a child, Rakeem was orphaned into foster care. His mother's struggle with substance abuse and behavioral issues caused him to move between multiple schools. He found an outlet of expression through Hip-Hop music being introduced musically to J Dilla, Madlib and MF Doom. Miles credits his Uncle who was a touring gospel rapper for introducing him to the East Coast Hip-Hop music scene and the lifestyle, causing him to pursue a career despite his grandmother's wishes. Miles attended North East high school, Located in North East, MD.

== Discography ==
Studio albums

- Depression (2012)
- Adderall (2015)
- Do They Really Love You (2016)
- Action Figure Miles (2019)

Singles

- Can't Be Friends (2016)
- A Dollar A Day(2016)
- That's My Girl(2018)
- Hard Way (2018)

== Tours ==
Headlining

- Weird and Awful (2016–Present)

== Artistry ==
In an Interview with Delaware Online, Rakeem cited Pharrell Williams, The Clipse and Kanye West as a focal point of his musical inspirations.
