= Redcoats (Australian band) =

Australian rock band

- Origin: Melbourne
- Genres: Rock
- Years active: 2009–present
- Label: Island Records Australia
- Members: Emilio Mercuri; Neil Wilkinson; Rhys Kelly; Andrew Braidner

Redcoats is a Melbourne-based rock band signed to Island Records Australia, which is part of Universal Music Australia. The band members consist of Emilio Mercuri on vocals, Neil Wilkinson on guitar, Rhys Kelly on bass and Andrew Braidner on the drums.

== Discography ==
=== Studio albums ===
| Year | Album |
|---|---|
| 2012 | Redcoats: Date released: October 2012; Record label: Island Records |

=== EPs ===
| Year | Album |
|---|---|
| 2011 | Redcoats: Date released: July 2011; Record label: Island Records |
