= City Calm Down =

Australian band

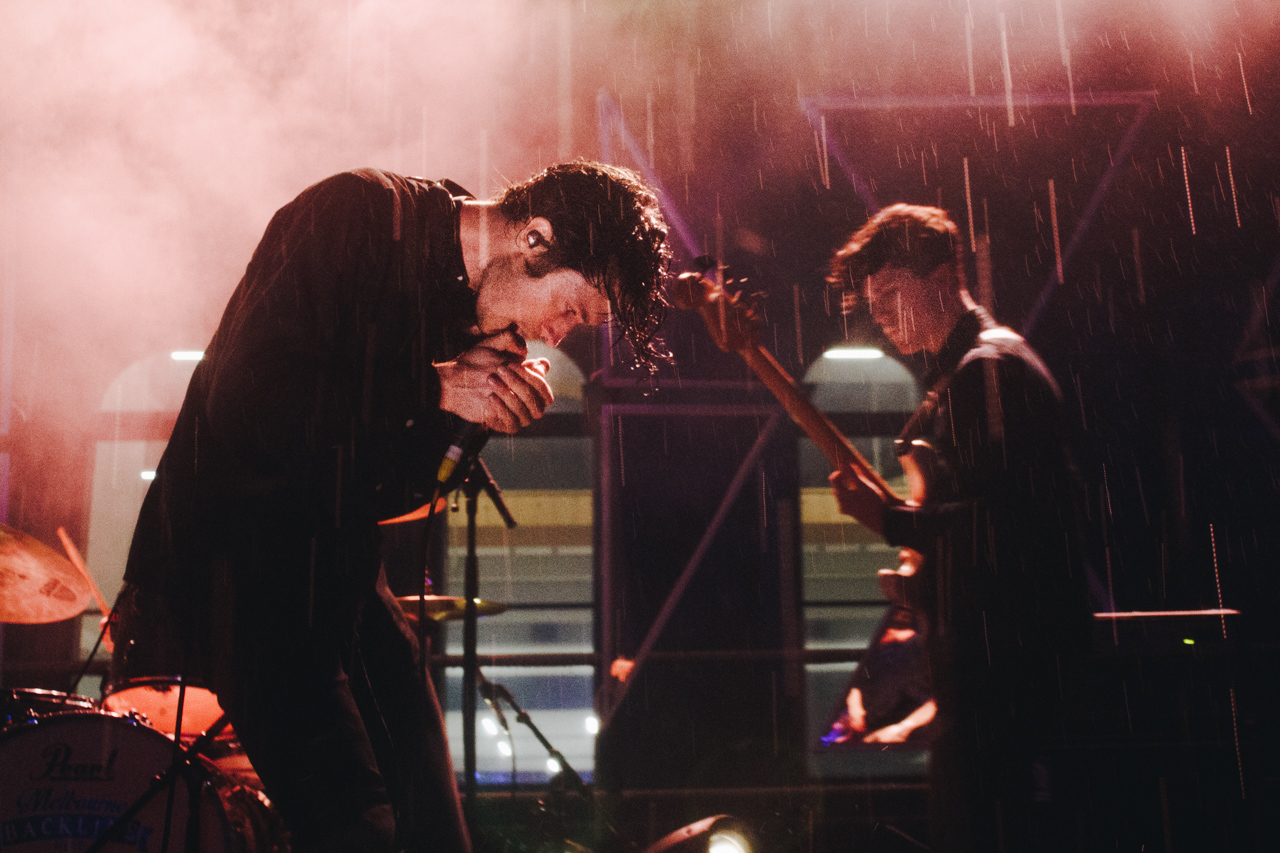
- City Calm Down at Shimmerlands, February 2017

Background information
- Origin: Melbourne, Australia
- Genres: Alternative; pop; electronic
- Years active: 2008–2019 (hiatus)
- Labels: I Oh You
- Members: Jack Bourke; Sam Mullaly; Jeremy Sonnenberg; Lee Armstrong
- Website: www.citycalmdown.com

City Calm Down are a four-piece band from Melbourne, Australia. The band's four members are Jack Bourke (vocals), Sam Mullaly (synths/keys), Jeremy Sonnenberg (bass), and Lee Armstrong (drums/percussion). Their debut album In a Restless House debuted at number 25 on the ARIA Charts, and the single "Rabbit Run" from the album came in 137th place on the Triple J Hottest 100 for 2015. They are signed with the Melbourne-based record label, I Oh You.

The band have played multiple sold-out tours and major festivals including Splendour in the Grass, Laneway, Falls, and The Great Escape. City Calm Down have also performed with Alt-J, Chvrches, and Bombay Bicycle Club. City Calm Down's song "Your Fix" appears in the 2017 game AFL: Evolution.

The band's second full-length album Echoes in Blue was released on 6 April 2018. Featuring the singles "In this Modern Land", "Joan, I'm Disappearing" and "Pride", the album debuted at number 20 on the ARIA Albums Chart and was given a 9/10 score by Beat Magazine.

Following the release of their third album Television in 2019, City Calm Down announced that the band was "going on indefinite hiatus".

== Discography ==
=== Albums ===
Title	Details	Peak chart positions
Title	Details	AUS
In a Restless House	Released: 6 November 2015; Label: I Oh You; Formats: CD, LP, digital download	25
Echoes in Blue	Released: 6 April 2018; Label: I Oh You; Formats: CD, LP, digital download	20
Television	Released: 23 August 2019; Label: I Oh You; Formats: CD, LP, digital download	63

=== Extended plays ===
Title	Details
Movements	Released: 4 November 2012; Label: I Oh You; Formats: CD, digital download

=== Singles ===
Year	Title	Album
"Speak to No End"	2013	Non-album singles
"Pavement"	2014	Non-album singles
"Rabbit Run"	2015	In a Restless House
"Son"	2015	In a Restless House
"Your Fix"	2016	In a Restless House
"Border On Control"	2016	In a Restless House
"Blood"	2017	Echoes in Blue
"Blame"	2017	Echoes in Blue
"In This Modern Land"	2017	Echoes in Blue
"Joan, I'm Disappearing"	2018	Echoes in Blue
"Television"	2019	Television
"Stuck (On the Eastern)"	2019	Television
"Flight"	2019	Television
"Mother"	2019	Television
