= Slowly Slowly (band) =

Australian pop punk band

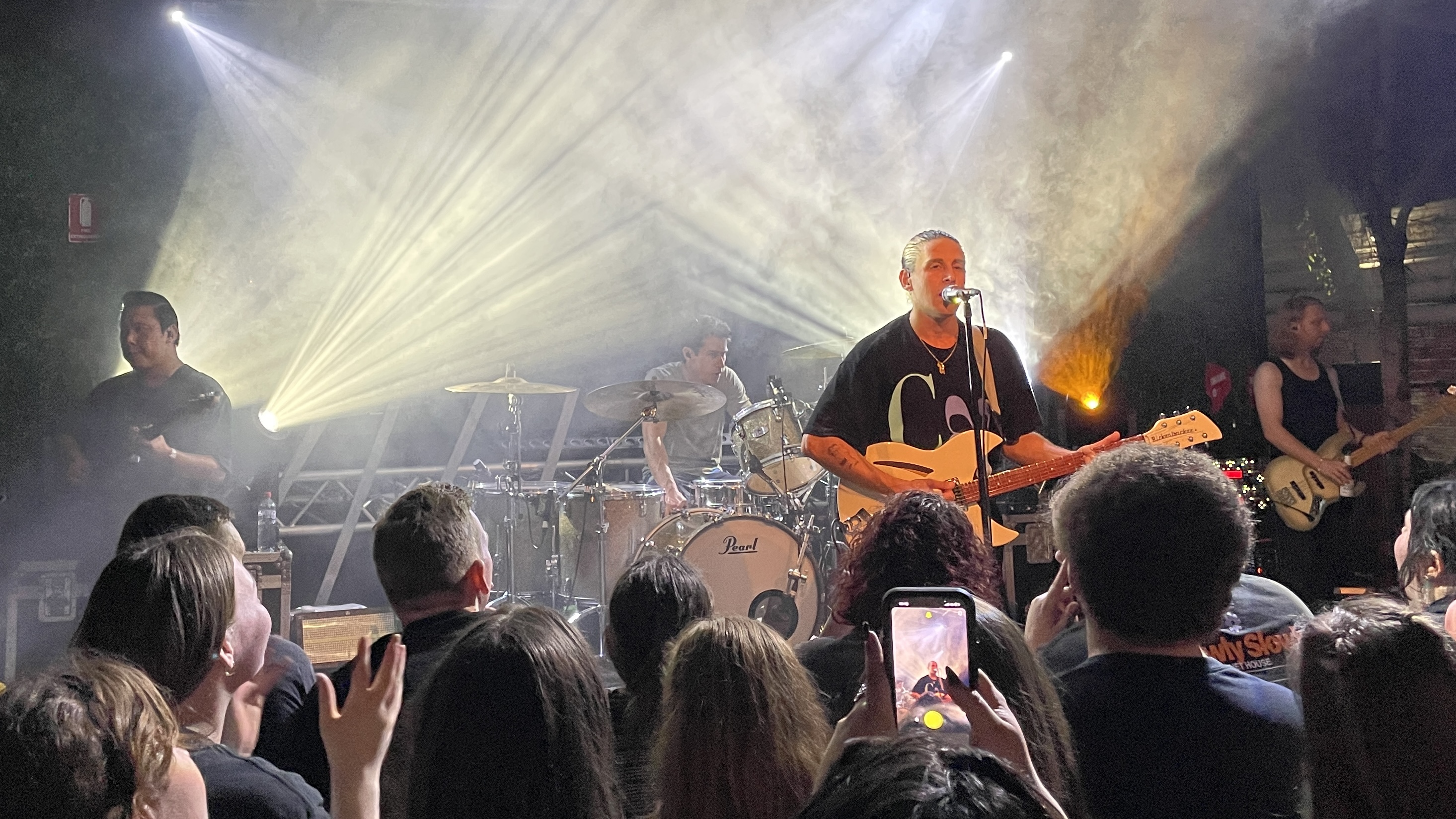
- Slowly Slowly live in Albury (2023)

Background information
- Origin: Melbourne, Victoria, Australia
- Genres: Pop punk; indie rock
- Years active: 2015–present
- Labels: Catch & Release; UNFD; Nettwerk
- Members: Ben Stewart; Patrick Murphy; Alex Quayle
- Past members: Albert Doan

Slowly Slowly is an Australian rock band from Melbourne, Victoria. The band currently consists of Ben Stewart (lead vocals, guitar), Patrick Murphy (drums), and Alex Quayle (bass guitar). Albert Doan (guitar) was a member of the band from its formation until 2026. The band released their debut album, Chamomile, in 2016. They have gone on to release a further four studio albums: St. Leonards (2018), Race Car Blues (2020), Daisy Chain (2022) and Forgiving Spree (2025).

Slowly Slowly has performed at festivals such as Beyond the Valley, Splendour in the Grass, and Party In The Paddock. They have also supported Red Hot Chili Peppers and Amy Shark on Australian national tours.

== Career ==
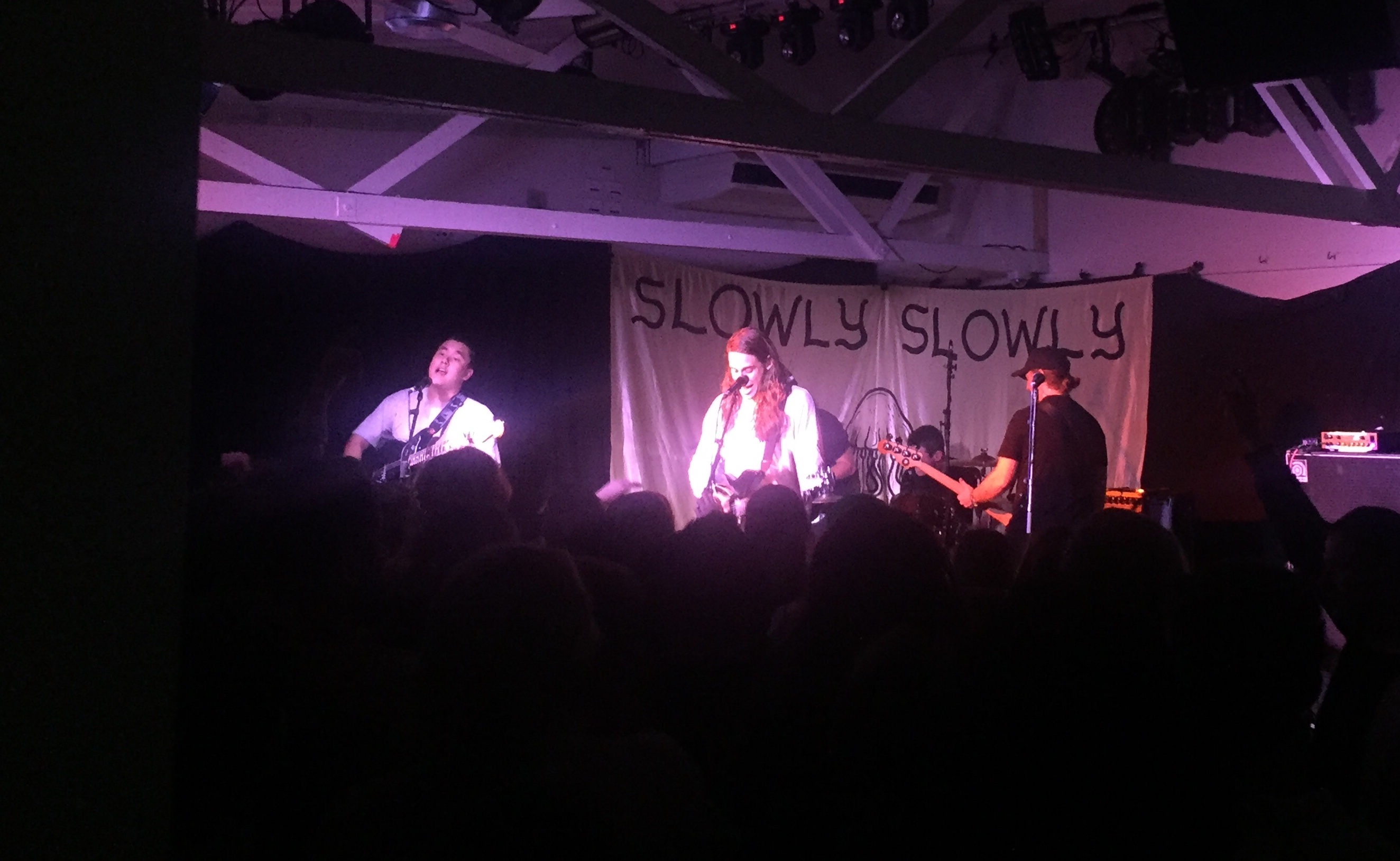
Slowly Slowly live at the Torquay Hotel (2019)

In June 2015, Slowly Slowly released their debut single "Empty Lungs". This was followed by the singles "New York, Paris" and "PMTWGR" in 2016. The band released their debut studio album Chamomile in July 2016.

In May 2018, Slowly Slowly released their second studio album St. Leonards which spawned three singles; "Aliens", "Alchemy" and "Ten Leaf Clover".

In May 2019, Slowly Slowly covered "Skinny Love" by Bon Iver for Triple J's Like a Version.

In January 2020, the group announced their third full-length album Race Car Blues, to be released on 28 February 2020. They released the album's title track on that same day.

On 25 January 2020, the band were announced as having placed at No. 57 in the Triple J Hottest 100, 2019, with the single "Jellyfish"; This was Slowly Slowly's first ever entry in the annual countdown.

In August 2021, the band cancelled the remainder of their Race Car Blues tour dates and said plans for the band are "on hold" due to health challenges currently being faced by frontman Ben Stewart.

On 22 January 2022, the band made their second-ever appearance in the Triple J Hottest 100, 2021, with the single "Blueprint". This would become the first single released for the band's fourth studio album, Daisy Chain, released on 4 November 2022.

In September 2024, the band announced the forthcoming release of Forgiving Spree.

On 25 July 2026, at their Chamomile 10 years gig at The Evelyn Hotel, Fitzroy, it was announced that Albert would no longer be playing with the band due to family commitments and the grueling tour schedule.

In October 2026, the band announced their sixth studio album Everybody Tells The Truth, planned for release in early 2027.

== Discography ==
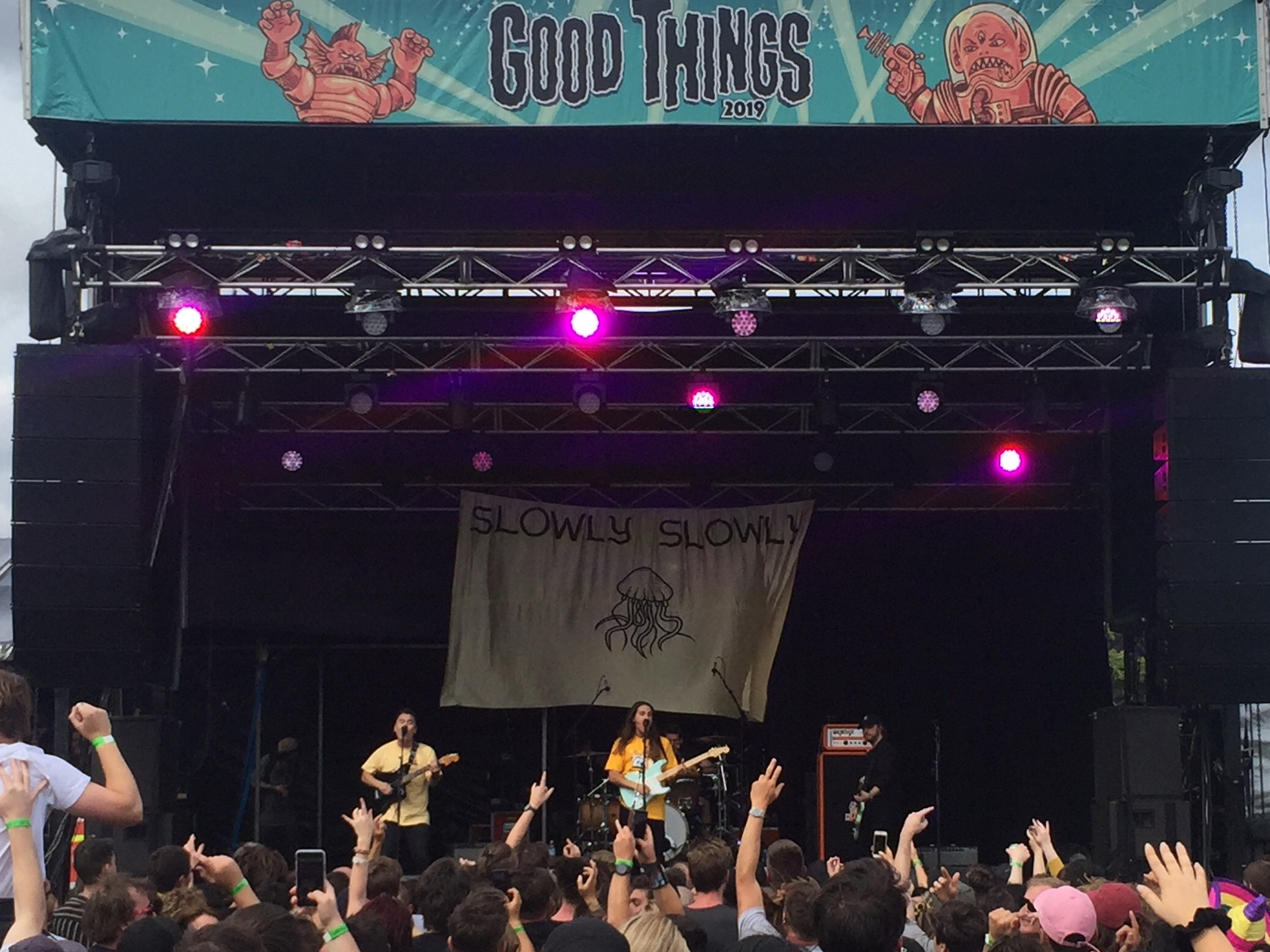
Slowly Slowly live at Good Things Festival Melbourne (2019)

=== Studio albums ===
List of studio albums, with release date, label, and selected chart positions shown
Title	Details	Peak chart positions
Title	Details	AUS
Chamomile	Released: 8 July 2016; Label: Slowly Slowly (independent), Catch & Release; Format: Digital download, streaming	—
St. Leonards	Released: 11 May 2018; Label: UNFD; Format: CD, LP, digital download, streaming	77
Race Car Blues	Released: 28 February 2020; Label: UNFD; Format: CD, LP, digital download, streaming	7
Daisy Chain	Released: 4 November 2022; Label: UNFD; Format: CD, LP, digital download, streaming	5
Forgiving Spree	Released: 24 January 2025; Label: Slowly Slowly, Nettwerk; Format: CD, LP, digital download, streaming	8
Everybody Tells The Truth	Released: 5 February 2027; Label: Slowly Slowly, Nettwerk; Format: CD, LP, digital download, streaming	-

=== Reissued albums ===
List of Reissued albums, with release date, label, and selected chart positions shown
Title	Details	Peak chart positions
Title	Details	AUS
Race Car Blues Chapter Two	Released: 26 February 2021; Label: UNFD; Format: LP, digital download, streaming	— (Note: Race Car Blues Chapter Two did not enter the ARIA Top 100 Albums Chart, but peaked at number 7 on the ARIA Vinyl Chart.)

=== Singles ===
List of singles as lead artist
Title	Year	Peak chart positions	Album
Title	Year	AUS	Album
"Empty Lungs"	2015	—	non album single
"New York, Paris"	2016	—	Chamomile
"PMTWGR"	2016	—	Chamomile
"Aliens"	2017	—	St. Leonards
"Alchemy"	2018	—	St. Leonards
"Ten Leaf Clover"	2018	—	St. Leonards
"Jellyfish"	2019	— (Note: "Jellyfish" did not enter the ARIA Top 100 Singles Chart, but peaked at number 18 on the Australian Independent Singles Chart.)	Race Car Blues
"Skinny Love" (Like a Version)	2019	—	Like a Version (Volume Fifteen)
"Creature of Habit Pt.2"	2019	—	Race Car Blues
"Safety Switch" (featuring Bec Stevens)	2019	—	Race Car Blues
"Low"	2019	—	Race Car Blues Chapter Two
"Race Car Blues"	2020	—	Race Car Blues
"19"	2020	—	Race Car Blues
"Slow Learner"	2020	—	non album singles
"Melbourne"	2020	—	non album singles
"Comets & Zombies"	2020	—	Race Car Blues Chapter Two
"The Level"	2021	—	Race Car Blues Chapter Two
"First Love" (featuring Yours Truly)	2021	—	Race Car Blues Chapter Two
"Blueprint"	2021	—	Daisy Chain
"Nothing On"	2022	—	Daisy Chain
"Forget You"	2022	—	Daisy Chain
"Daisy Chain"	2022	—	Daisy Chain
"Longshot"	2022	—	Daisy Chain
"God"	2022	—	Daisy Chain
"Gimme the Wrench"	2024	—	Forgiving Spree
"All Time"	2024	—	Forgiving Spree
"Forgiving Spree"	2024	—	Forgiving Spree
"Love Letters"	2024	—	Forgiving Spree
"How Are You Mine?"	2024	—	Forgiving Spree
"Sacrosaint"	2026	—	Everybody Tells The Truth
"Parallel"	2026	—	Everybody Tells The Truth
"Too Good to Be True"	2026	—	Everybody Tells The Truth

== Awards and nominations ==
=== AIR Awards ===
The Australian Independent Record Awards (commonly known as the AIR Awards) is an annual awards night to recognise, promote and celebrate the success of Australia's independent music sector.

Year	Nominee / work	Award	Result	Ref.
2021	Race Car Blues	Best Independent Rock Album or EP	Nominated	
2023	Daisy Chain	Best Independent Rock Album or EP	Nominated	
2026	Benjamin Stewart for Forgiving Spree	Independent Producer of the Year	Nominated	

=== APRA Awards ===
The APRA Awards are held in Australia and New Zealand by the Australasian Performing Right Association to recognise songwriting skills, sales and airplay performance by its members annually. Slowly Slowly has been nominated for one award.

Year	Nominee / work	Award	Result	Ref.
2020	"Jellyfish" (Ben Stewart)	Most Performed Rock Work of the Year	Nominated	

=== J Award ===
The J Awards are an annual series of Australian music awards that were established by the Australian Broadcasting Corporation's youth-focused radio station Triple J. They commenced in 2005.

Year	Nominee / work	Award	Result	Ref.
2018	Themselves	Unearthed Artist of the Year	Nominated	

=== Rolling Stone Australia Awards ===
The Rolling Stone Australia Awards are awarded annually in January or February by the Australian edition of Rolling Stone magazine for outstanding contributions to popular culture in the previous year.

Year	Nominee / work	Award	Result	Ref.
2022	"Blueprint"	Best Single	Nominated	
