= Love Heart Cheat Code =

Studio album by Hiatus Kaiyote
- Released: 28 June 2024
- Genres: Neo-soul; future soul; psychedelic
- Length: 36:18
- Labels: Brainfeeder; Ninja Tune
- Producer: Mario Caldato Jr.

Hiatus Kaiyote chronology
Mood Variant (The Remixes) (2022)	Love Heart Cheat Code (2024)

Singles from Love Heart Cheat Code
- 1. "Everything's Beautiful" Released: 24 January 2024; 2. "Make Friends" Released: 27 March 2024; 3. "Telescope" Released: 2 May 2024; 4. "Love Heart Cheat Code" Released: 30 May 2024; 5. "Cinnamon Temple" Released: 19 June 2024

Love Heart Cheat Code is the fourth studio album by Australian jazz/funk band Hiatus Kaiyote, released on 28 June 2024 by Brainfeeder and Ninja Tune. The album was produced by Mario Caldato Jr., and was preceded by five singles.

At the 2024 ARIA Music Awards, the band was nominated for Best Group. The album was nominated for the 2024 Australian Music Prize. The cover art by Rajni Perera won the Best Art Vinyl Award for 2024.

== Background and recording ==
Love Heart Cheat Code follows up the band's 2021 album Mood Valiant, which won Best Independent Jazz Album or EP at the AIR Awards of 2022 and was nominated for Best Progressive R&B Album at the 64th Annual Grammy Awards.

Unlike Mood Valiant, which included improvisation-focused songs such as "Sparkle Tape Break Up" and "And We Go Gentle", the band focused on prewritten compositions which were brought to and refined in the studio. For the album, the band recorded with producer Mario Caldato Jr. and a group of their fellow Melbourne musicians including Taylor "Chip" Crawford, who played an instrument he invented called the frello; (Note: According to Crawford's Bandcamp, the frello is "a homemade instrument" that consists of "a fretted cello with spring reverb".) guitarist Tom Martin; and flutist Nikodimos.

Per frontwoman Nai Palm, the album's name "doesn't mean anything and it means everything. On one hand, it's just cool words together. But also — and I don't care if I sound corny here, because I'm a romantic — but I really believe if you move through the world with love, it's the ultimate cheat code to the world."

== Release ==
The first single from the album, "Everything's Beautiful", was released on 24 January 2024. Per Nai Palm, the song "is a testament to the importance of finding simple joy in your day." It is said to keep "a sense of rhythm and buoyant dynamism throughout its runtime". The melody came to Nai Palm upon waking up from a nap in her manager's apartment in Brooklyn; she originally sang "Berry Street Beautiful", after the road in Williamsburg, Brooklyn, before eventually refining it to the song's title. The song is preceded by "BMO Is Beautiful", which was named in reference to the Adventure Time character BMO, and features BMO's voice actress Niki Yang.

The album was announced on 27 March, with a release date of 28 June. With the announcement came the second single, "Make Friends", a "woozy" funk ode to platonic love with references to men, women, and non-binary people. The song was inspired by a friend saying that "You don't make friends, you recognize them." The band also announced tour dates in the US and Canada in June and July, with some shows also featuring Digable Planets and the Free Nationals.

The third single, "Telescope", was released on 2 May. About the song, bassist Paul Bender said, "NASA has a website where you can type in your birthday and then it will tell you the most interesting thing that the Hubble telescope took a picture of on your birthday. And so each of the four verses is based on our four birthdays." Bender's heavenly object was Abell 2744; Nai Palm's was the Great Red Spot on Jupiter; keyboardist Simon Mavin's was the Einstein ring, and drummer Perrin Moss's was a nameless star that exploded with a light many times brighter than the Sun. The song's lyrics include quotes from the Temptations' "My Girl" and Sun Ra's "Space Is the Place".

The fourth single, the title track, was released on 30 May. On the song, Bender said "Everybody in the band has an array of toys and sounds and stuff, and I just remember thinking, 'I wonder how it would sound if I put my little bass pedal on 'harmonise' mode?'" The song came together when Mavin added chords from a Roland RS 505 Paraphonic synthesiser which gave them a "eureka" moment, after which Nai Palm shaped it into the finished song.

The fifth and final single, "Cinnamon Temple", was released on 19 June. Per Nai Palm, the song gets its name because "in Mali they have these mud brick mosques that look like they have cinnamon stuck in them. And because it was inspired by a Malian rhythm, there's that element to it." The song, considered a fan favourite, had been in the band's live repertoire since 2015, with Mavin saying its heavy riff is reflective of the band's musical interests from the time.

The album closes on a cover of the Jefferson Airplane song "White Rabbit", which Mavin called his favorite song on the album. It began with Bender composing a bassline, which Nai Palm started singing the lyrics to "White Rabbit" over. Their rendition began as an "ugly, minimal version", with the band layering sounds over it. Per Nai Palm, "White Rabbit" is a political song, and while most covers of it "do this throwback psychedelia thing", she wanted to expand on it because, "it's like, what does psychedelia look like now that we've got new drugs and new wars?"

"Dimitri" was inspired by a story about the composer Dmitri Shostakovich being able to hear atonal melodies because of a piece of shrapnel stuck in his brain which Bender had read about in the Oliver Sacks book Musicophilia. "Longcat" is in reference to a toy cat the other band members bought for Bender at a rest stop in Japan, named after the real life cat which became an internet meme. The album's cover art is a painting by Toronto artist Rajni Perera; the album also features illustrations done by Chloe Biocca and Grey Ghost.

== Style ==
The album consists of neo-soul, future soul, and psychedelic music.

== Reception ==
Love Heart Cheat Code ratings
Aggregate scores
Source	Rating
Metacritic	75/100
Review scores
Source	Rating
AllMusic	4.5/5 stars
Exclaim!	6/10
Far Out	2.5/5 stars
Mojo	3/5 stars
The Skinny	4/5 stars
Slant Magazine	2.5/5 stars

According to the review aggregator Metacritic, Love Heart Cheat Code received "generally favorable reviews" based on a weighted average score of 75 out of 100 from six critic scores.

Les Inrockuptibles's Vincent Brunner wrote that, "boosted by the presence of the Brazilian Mario Caldato Jr. on production (collaborator of the Beastie Boys or Seu Jorge), the dazzling creativity of Hiatus Kaiyote seems far from drying up, like his thirst for good vibrations. This is what this fourth album proves, in line with the previous ones but never redundant." AllMusic's Andy Kellman wrote that "Increased chaos and whimsy only heightens Hiatus Kaiyote's ability to enchant and exhilarate." Exclaim!'s Megan LaPierre summarized the band by saying "even when repeating patterns and not really achieving emotional resonance (on purpose?), their lyrical nonsense ... and skyscraper-scaling arrangements still make for a pleasurable, entertaining listen, especially coupled with incense swirling in the bloated breeze on a hazy summer night."

In a negative review, Slant Magazine's Charles Lyons-Burt called the album "self-indulgent" and said it "can't help but register as Psychedelia for Dummies." Far Out's Elle Palmer said the album's latter half was much stronger than the first, and that "it's a shame that the record holds those fuzzier sounds back until its final moments, but they're stunning nonetheless. It is in these glimpses that they prove themselves to be one of the era's most important bands but evidently not yet the most refined or assertive."

== Track listing ==
All tracks are written by Naomi Saalfield, Paul Bender, Simon Mavin, and Perrin Moss, except where noted.

Love Heart Cheat Code track listing
No.	Title	Writer(s)	Length
1.	"Dreamboat"		2:11
2.	"Telescope"	Saalfield; Bender; Mavin; Moss; Ronald White; Smokey Robinson	4:46
3.	"Make Friends"		4:53
4.	"BMO Is Beautiful" (featuring Niki Yang)		0:41
5.	"Everything's Beautiful"		2:50
6.	"Dimitri"		4:28
7.	"Longcat"		1:47
8.	"How to Meet Yourself"		3:16
9.	"Love Heart Cheat Code"		4:33
10.	"Cinnamon Temple"		3:20
11.	"White Rabbit"	Grace Slick	3:33
Total length:			36:18

== Personnel ==
=== Hiatus Kaiyote ===
- Nai Palm – vocals, guitar
- Paul Bender – bass
- Simon Mavin – keyboards
- Perrin Moss – drums

=== Additional musicians ===
- Taylor "Chip" Crawford – frello
- Tom Martin – guitar
- Nikodimos – flute
- Niki Yang – vocals (4)

=== Technical ===
- Mario Caldato Jr. – producer, mixing engineer
- Jonathan Maia – mixing engineer
- Hiatus Kaiyote – mixing engineer
- Andrei Eremin – mastering engineer
- Rajni Perera – cover art

== Charts ==
Chart performance for Love Heart Cheat Code
Chart (2024)	Peak position
Australian Albums (ARIA)	40
Japanese Hot Albums (Billboard Japan)	72
Scottish Albums (Official Charts)	87
UK Album Downloads (Official Charts)	53
UK Independent Albums (Official Charts)	8
