= Mia Wray =

Australian pop singer and songwriter

- Wray speaking in August 2024
- Born: Mia Isobel Wray-McCann; 28 October 1995 (age 31); Sunrise Beach, Queensland, Australia
- Occupations: Singer; songwriter; musician
- Years active: 2011–present
- Awards: Full list
- Musical career
- Genres: Pop; bedroom pop; blues; folk-pop; indie pop; soul
- Instruments: Vocals; piano; guitar; harmonica; foot drum
- Labels: Ivy League; Mushroom Music
- Website: miawray.com

Mia Isobel Wray-McCann (born 28 October 1995), known professionally as Mia Wray, is an Australian pop singer, songwriter and musician from Noosa, Queensland.

Born and raised in Noosa before later relocating to Melbourne, Victoria, Wray rose to prominence after winning the 2011 iteration of Telstra's Road to Discovery Program. She independently released two extended plays, Mia Wray (2014) and Send Me Your Love (2016), before releasing her debut single "Work for Me" in 2020.

Wray began her career performing soul, blues and folk music, later shifting to genres such as pop and bedroom pop whilst retaining soul influences. She has toured with the Rubens and the Teskey Brothers, and Vance Joy, on his Long Way Home Tour in 2022.

Wray signed to Ivy League Records in January 2021 and received nominations for Breakthrough Independent Artist of the Year at the 2021 AIR Awards, Best Solo Artist at the 2021 Music Victoria Awards, and placed second in the Performance category at the International Songwriting Competition.

== Early life ==
Wray was born Mia Isobel Wray-McCann in Sunrise Beach, Noosa, Queensland, on 28 October 1995, the daughter of Carolyn. At the age of 11, Wray's parents inherited her late grandfather's piano, and moved it into Mia's bedroom upon discovering it was the only room of the house big enough for it. Wray learnt to play it from that age onwards, and began to write songs in her adolescent years. She would later learn to play the guitar through video lessons on YouTube.

Wray completed her senior secondary education at St Andrew's Anglican College in Peregian Springs, Queensland.

== Musical style and influences ==
Wray began her career in 2011 as a folk-pop and acoustic artist, citing the Beatles, Paul Kelly, Bob Dylan, Pete Murray, Laura Marling, and Gabrielle Aplin among her sonic influences. Wray described herself at the time as a soul, blues and folk musician. Wray has listed Gabrielle Aplin, Coldplay, Paul Kelly, and Bob Dylan as being several of her favourite musicians. Wray has since shifted to more pop-oriented music, drawing influence from Florence and the Machine, Lana Del Rey and Maggie Rogers. Her music has been additionally described as bedroom pop, blues, folk-pop, indie pop, and soul.

Wray can play the piano, guitar, the harmonica and the foot drum.

Wray's music has received favourable comparisons to that of Lorde, Meg Mac, Vera Blue, Florence and the Machine, and Adele.

== Career ==
=== 2011–2019: Breakthrough and Mia Wray ===
On 3 December 2011, Wray was announced as the joint finalist of the 2011 Telstra Road to Discovery talent development program, alongside Andrew Redford from Maroochydore, Queensland. On 24 January 2012, the pair competed in the final of the quest, held during the 40th Tamworth Country Music Festival. On 13 February, Wray was announced as the recipient of the Telstra Road to Discovery People's Choice Award. Wray signed with Mushroom Records following her People's Choice Award win. On 2 July 2014, Wray released her debut extended play Mia Wray. Mia Wray was recorded in Gippsland, Victoria over five days and was produced by Greg Walker. A track from the EP, "Where I Stand", was featured on the soundtrack for the film Midnight Sun (2018). On 5 October 2015, Wray performed at the Caloundra Music Festival. On 22 April 2016, Wray released her second extended play Send Me Your Love. Send Me Your Love was recorded in Nashville, Tennessee, with production from Brad Jones. The same day, Wray performed as the opening act for former Powderfinger guitarist Darren Middleton at Red Hot Music, in Devonport, Tasmania. On 17 February 2017, Wray featured on French producer Aslove's cover of Corinne Bailey Rae's song "Put Your Records On".

=== 2020–2023: Stay Awake ===
On 9 May 2020, Wray appeared as part of online music initiative The State of Music, where she performed Helen Reddy's "I Am Woman" alongside Kate Miller-Heidke, Mahalia Barnes, and Missy Higgins. On 13 September, Wray's debut single "Work for Me" was premiered on Triple J's 2020 program with Richard Kingsmill. "Work for Me" was officially released on 16 September, alongside an accompanying music video. Triple J described the song as having "stomping percussion, electrifying brass and empowering AF songwriting". On 28 September, Wray was announced as the Triple J Unearthed Feature Artist on Triple J for that week. On 24 October, Wray was announced as one of the acts scheduled to perform on the premiere of the second season of Australian live music program The Sound. On 31 October, Wray performed on the 32nd edition of Isol-Aid, an Instagram live music festival created during the COVID-19 pandemic. On 1 November, Wray performed an a cappella version of "Work for Me" from Athenaeum Theatre, Melbourne for The Sound's season two premiere. On 20 November, Wray featured as a backing vocalist on the song "Blue Bird" from Something for Kate's seventh studio album The Modern Medieval (2020). On 20 January 2021, Ivy League Records announced that they had signed Wray to their roster. The same day, she released the single "Never Gonna Be the Same". "Never Gonna Be the Same" was added to rotation by Triple J on 25 January 2021. On 27 February, Wray supported Something for Kate at the Summer Sounds Festival at the Sidney Myer Music Bowl. On 9 March, Wray announced her debut headline tour, a four-date residency at the Northcote Social Club, in Northcote, Victoria. On 9 April, Wray was announced as a support act for the Teskey Brothers' concert at the Forum Theatre in Melbourne, held in support of the band's live album named after the venue. The one-off concert took place on 21 April 2021. On 22 April, Wray announced her first east coast tour, in support of the single "Never Gonna Be the Same". Throughout April and May, Wray supported the Rubens alongside Alice Ivy on their national Live in Life Tour. On 4 May, "Work for Me" placed second in the Performance category at the 2021 iteration of the International Songwriting Competition. On 2 June, Wray was announced as a nominee for Breakthrough Independent Artist of the Year at the 2021 AIR Awards; alternative rock band Spacey Jane were later announced as the recipient of the award on 5 August. On 3 June, Wray released the single "Needs". On 13 September, "Work for Me" was shortlisted for Best Song at the 2021 Music Victoria Awards. On 4 November, Wray was announced as a support act for the Oceanian leg of Melbourne musician Vance Joy's 2022 Long Way Home Tour, alongside the Rubens, Thelma Plum, Middle Kids and Budjerah.

On 19 January 2022, Wray was announced as one of the performers at the 2022 Australian Open. On 30 March, Wray premiered the single "Rerun" on Triple J's Good Nights program with Bridget Hustwaite. "Rerun" was released later the same day. Alongside the release, Wray announced a four-date residency at the Gem, in Collingwood, Victoria, which were scheduled to take place on 14, 21, and 28 April, before they were ultimately cancelled due to "unforeseen circumstances". On 10 August, Wray's single "Evidence" was premiered on Good Nights with Bridget Hustwaite, before being released the same evening.

In November 2022, Wray announced the forthcoming release of EP Stay Awake, scheduled for release on 10 February 2023.

On 19 April 2023, Wray released her single Monster Brain. In May 2023, Wray accompanied Maisie Peters on tour as a support act. During this tour, she performed in Antwerp, Paris, Amsterdam, Berlin and Cologne.

In October 2023, Wray released a new single titled "Tell Her".

=== 2024–present: Hi, It's Nice to Meet Me ===
In October 2024, Wray announced her debut album, Hi, It's Nice to Meet Me, which was released on 14 March 2025.

From January to March 2026, Wray supported Ed Sheeran on the New Zealand and Australia shows of his Loop Tour.

== Personal life ==
Wray currently resides in Melbourne, Victoria. In January 2025 Wray, with the release of her new song, came out as gay.

== Discography ==
=== Albums ===
List of albums, with release date and label shown
Title	Album details	Peak chart positions
Title	Album details	AUS
Hi, It's Nice to Meet Me	Released: 14 March 2025; Label: Mushroom Music; Formats: Vinyl, CD, digital download, streaming	26

=== Extended plays ===
List of EPs, with release date and label shown
Title	EP details
Mia Wray	Released: 2 July 2014; Label: Mia Wray (independent); Formats: CD, digital download, streaming
Send Me Your Love	Released: 22 April 2016; Label: Mia Wray (independent); Formats: CD, digital download, streaming
Stay Awake	Released: 10 February 2023; Label: Ivy League Records / Mushroom Music; Formats: CD, digital download, streaming

=== Singles ===
==== As lead artist ====
List of singles, with year released and album name shown
Title	Year	Album
"Work for Me"	2020	Non-album singles
"Never Gonna Be the Same"	2021	Non-album singles
"Needs"	2021	Non-album singles
"Rerun"	2022	Stay Awake
"Evidence"	2022	Stay Awake
"Stay Awake"	2022	Stay Awake
"Monster Brain"	2023	Non-album single
"Tell Her"	2023	Hi, It's Nice to Meet Me
"What If"	2024	Hi, It's Nice to Meet Me
"The Way She Moves"	2024	Hi, It's Nice to Meet Me
"Nice to Meet Me"	2024	Hi, It's Nice to Meet Me
"Fake a Smile"	2024	Hi, It's Nice to Meet Me
"Not Enough"	2025	Hi, It's Nice to Meet Me
"Sad But True"	2025	Hi, It's Nice to Meet Me
"Ghost in My Machine" (with Gabrielle Aplin)	2025	Hi, It's Nice to Meet Me
"When We Were Young"	2026	TBA
"Isn't It Funny"	2026	TBA

==== As featured artist ====
List of singles, with year released and album name shown
Title	Year	Album
"Put Your Records On" (Aslove featuring Mia Wray)	2017	Non-album single

=== Guest appearances ===
List of guest appearances, with year released, artist(s) and album name shown
Title	Year	Artist(s)	Album
"Where I Stand"	2018	Various artists	Midnight Sun (Original Motion Picture Soundtrack)
"Blue Bird"	2020	Something for Kate	The Modern Medieval
"Delete"	2023	Dean Brady	Mushroom: Fifty Years of Making Noise (Reimagined)

== Filmography ==
=== Television ===
List of television appearances, with year released, role, notes, and supporting reference shown
Year	Title	Role	Notes	Ref.
2020	The Sound	Herself	Pre-recorded live performance of "Work for Me"	
2020	The Sound	Herself	Live performance of "Slipping Away" alongside Marcia Hines, Didirri, Andy Bull, and Russell Morris	

=== Music videos ===
List of music videos, with year released, director(s), and supporting reference shown
Year	Title	Director(s)	Ref.
2020	"Work for Me"	Cybele Malinowski	
2021	"Never Gonna Be the Same"	Grace Cardona	
2021	"Needs"	Gilda Jones and Giulia Giannini McGauran	
2022	"Rerun"	Triana Hernandez	
2022	"Evidence"		
2023	"Stay Awake"		
2023	"Monster Brain"		
2024	"What If"		

== Concert tours ==
=== Headlining ===
- Northcote Social Club Residency Tour (2021)
- Never Gonna Be the Same Tour (2021)
- The Gem Residency Tour (2022; cancelled)

=== Supporting ===
- Live in Life Tour – the Rubens (2021) (with Alice Ivy)
- The Forum Concert – the Teskey Brothers (2021)
- Long Way Home Tour – Vance Joy (2022) (with the Rubens, Thelma Plum, Middle Kids and Budjerah)
- Maisie Takes Europe – Maisie Peters (2023)
- Loop Tour - Ed Sheeran with Vance Joy, Aaron Rowe and BIIRD

== Awards and nominations ==
=== AIR Awards ===
Year	Nominee / work	Award	Result	Ref.
2021	Herself	Breakthrough Independent Artist of the Year	Nominated	

=== Australian Music Prize ===
The Australian Music Prize (the AMP) is an annual award of $50,000 given to an Australian band or solo artist in recognition of the merit of an album released during the year of award. It commenced in 2005.

Year	Nominee / work	Award	Result	Ref.
2025	Hi, It's Nice to Meet Me	Australian Music Prize	Nominated	

=== ARIA Music Awards ===
The ARIA Music Awards is an annual awards ceremony held by the Australian Recording Industry Association. They commenced in 1987.

Year	Nominee / work	Award	Result	Ref.
2025	Hi, It's Nice to Meet Me	Michael Gudinski Breakthrough Artist	Nominated	

=== International Songwriting Competition ===
Year	Nominee / work	Award	Result	Ref.
2021	"Work for Me"	Performance	2nd	

=== Music Victoria Awards ===
Year	Nominee / work	Award	Result	Ref.
2021	"Work for Me"	Best Song	Shortlisted	
2021	Herself	Best Solo Artist	Nominated	
2023	Mia Wray	Best Pop Work	Nominated	

=== Rolling Stone Australia Awards ===
The Rolling Stone Australia Awards are awarded annually in January or February by the Australian edition of Rolling Stone magazine for outstanding contributions to popular culture in the previous year.

Year	Nominee / work	Award	Result	Ref.
2025	Mia Wray	Best New Artist	Shortlisted	

=== Telstra Road to Discovery Program ===
Wray (alongside fellow Sunshine Coast resident Andrew Redford), was named as one of ten finalists for the 2012 Telstra Road to Discovery talent development program on 3 December 2011, before being announced as the winner of the People's Choice Award on 13 February 2012.

Year	Nominee / work	Award	Result	Ref.
2012	Telstra Road to Discovery Program	People's Choice Award	Won	
