= 2021 Music Victoria Awards =

Annual Australian music awards ceremony

- Date: 9 December 2021
- Venue: Melbourne Recital Centre
- Hosted by: Emma Peel and Daniel James

Highlights
- Most wins: Emma Donovan & The Putbacks (3)
- Website: http://www.musicvictoria.com.au

Television/radio coverage
- Network: Channel 31, PBS 106.7FM, 3RRR

The 2021 Music Victoria Awards were the 16th Annual Music Victoria Awards.

== Description ==
The ceremony took place on 9 December 2021 at the Melbourne Recital Centre.

The 2021 awards featured a number of changes, including a brand new category for Best Pop Act and the inaugural Arts Access Victoria Amplify Award (for deaf and disabled musicians). All genre categories will now be assessed on the act rather than album, with the requirement that nominees have released at least multiple recordings between 1 July 2020 – 30 June 2021.

New CEO Simone Schinkel headed up the event for the first time, taking over from Music Victoria founder Patrick Donovan. Schinkel said "As part of our commitment to continual improvement we have refined our Awards criteria, categories and judging processes which we believe will more accurately reflect and reward the diverse music community in Victoria."

== Hall of Fame inductees ==
The Hall of Fame inductees were announced on 7 October 2021

- Kylie Minogue
- Pierre Baroni

== Performers ==
- Emma Donovan & The Putbacks
- Kerryn Fields
- Maple Glider
- Mindy Meng Wang & Tim Shiel

== Award nominees and winners ==
Winners indicated in boldface, with other nominees in plain.

=== General awards ===
The general awards are nominated by an expert industry panel and open to public voting in October.

Best Victorian Album	Best Victorian Song
**Emma Donovan & The Putbacks – Crossover**; Alice Ivy – Don't Sleep; The Avalanches – We Will Always Love You; Gordon Koang – Unity; Hiatus Kaiyote – Mood Valiant	**Hiatus Kaiyote – "Red Room"**; Alex Lahey & Gordi – "Dino's"; Alice Skye – "Party Tricks"; The Avalanches – "Wherever You Go"; Geoffrey O'Connor & Jonnine – "For As Long As I Can Remember"
Best Breakthrough Act	Best Group
**Maple Glider**; Ashwarya; Blake Scott; Cry Club; SHOUSE	**Emma Donovan and The Putbacks**; The Avalanches; Hiatus Kaiyote; King Gizzard & the Lizard Wizard; Mildlife
Best Musician	Best Solo Artist
**Mindy Meng Wang**; Amanda Roff (Time for Dreams, Harmony); Andrea Keller; David Lane (Solo, You Am I); Emma Donovan; Erica Dunn (Tropical Fuck Storm, Mod Con); G Flip; Lance Ferguson (The Bamboos); Nai Palm (Hiatus Kaiyote); Stu Mackenzie (King Gizzard & the Lizard Wizard)	**Sampa the Great**; Alice Ivy; Baker Boy; Blake Scott; G Flip; Gordon Koang; Kylie Auldist; Liz Stringer; Maple Glider; Mia Wray
Best Live Act
**Amyl and the Sniffers**; Cable Ties; Kee'Ahn; Mildlife; RVG

=== Genre Specific Awards ===
Voted by a select industry panel

Arts Access Amplify Award (for Deaf and Disabled acts)	The Archie Roach Foundation Award for Emerging Talent
**Eliza Hull**; Gordon Koang; Kerryn Fields; Nat Bartsch; Rudely Interrupted	**Allara**; Bumpy; Madi Colville Walker; The Merindas; River Boy
Best Blues Act	Best Country Act
**Dan Dinnen & Shorty**; Aaron Pollock; Anna Scionti; Blues Roulette; Josh Teskey and Ash Grunwald	**The Weeping Willows**; Ben Mastwyk & His Millions; Georgia State Line; James Ellis & The Jealous Guys; Lachlan Bryan & the Wildes
Best Electronic Act	Best Experimental Act or Avant-Garde Act
**Female Wizard**; Alex Albrecht; Jennifer Loveless; Reptant; SaD	**Candlesnuffer**; Aarti Jadu; Deborah Cheetham, Byron Scullin, Tom Supple; Red Wine and Sugar; Thembi Soddell
Best Folk Act	Best Heavy Act
**Charm of Finches**; Erica Bramham; Kerryn Fields; Lucy Wise; Maple Glider	**Dr Colossus**; Divide and Dissolve; Faceless Burial; Growth; NICOLAS CAGE FIGHTER
Best Hip Hop Act	Best Intercultural Act
**DRMNGNOW**; Agung Mango; Briggs; Man Made Mountain; Pookie	**Ajak Kwai**; Amaru Tribe; Black Jesus Experience; Gelareh Pour's Garden; Tio
Best Jazz Act	Best Pop Act
**Andrea Kellar**; Audrey Powne; Australian Art Orchestra; Menagerie; The Rookies	**Alice Skye**; Alice Ivy; Geoffrey O'Connor; Gregor; June Jones
Best Reggae or Dance Hall Act	Best Rock/Punk Act
**JahWise Productions**; Disun Future; Jah Tung; Marvin Priest; Monkey Marc	**Civic**; Blake Scott; Mod Con; Plaster of Paris; Tom Lyngcoln
Best Soul, Funk, R'n'B or Gospel Act	Best Regional/Outer Suburban Act
**Emma Donovan & The Putbacks**; The Bamboos; Hiatus Kaiyote; Izy; Kee'ahn	**Baker Boy**; Bones and Jones; D'Arcy Spiller; Fenn Wilson; The Teskey Brothers

=== Industry Awards ===
Voted by a select industry panel.

Best Small Venue (under 500 capacity)	Best Large Venue (Over 500 capacity)
**Northcote Social Club, Northcote**: Brunswick Ballroom, Brunswick; LOOP Project Space & Bar, Melbourne; The Night Cat, Fitzroy; The Substation, Newport	**Melbourne Recital Centre – Elisabeth Murdoch Hall**: Corner Hotel, Richmond; Forum Melbourne; Hamer Hall, Melbourne; Sidney Myer Music Bowl
Best Regional/Outer Suburban Venue (Over 50 Gigs a Year)	Best Regional/Outer Suburban Venue (Under 50 Gigs a Year)
**Theatre Royal, Castlemaine**: The Barwon Club Hotel, South Geelong; The Eastern, Ballarat; Piano Bar, Geelong; Sooki Lounge, Belgrave	**Vine Hotel, Wangaratta**: Halls Gap Hotel, Halls Gap; The Macedon Railway Hotel, Macedon; The Sound Doctor Presents, Anglesea; Tom Katz! @ Sorrento Portsea RSL, Sorrento
Best Festival	Best Producer
**Isol-Aid**: Brunswick Music Festival; Melbourne Music Week; MPavilion 2020; The Secret Garden Gig Gathering	**Eilish Gilligan**: Alice Ivy; Anna Laverty; Becki Whitton; River Boy
Outstanding Woman in Music
**Charlotte Abroms**: Andrea Keller; Emily Ulman; Emma Donovan; Sarah Blaby
