= Nai Palm =

Australian neo soul musician

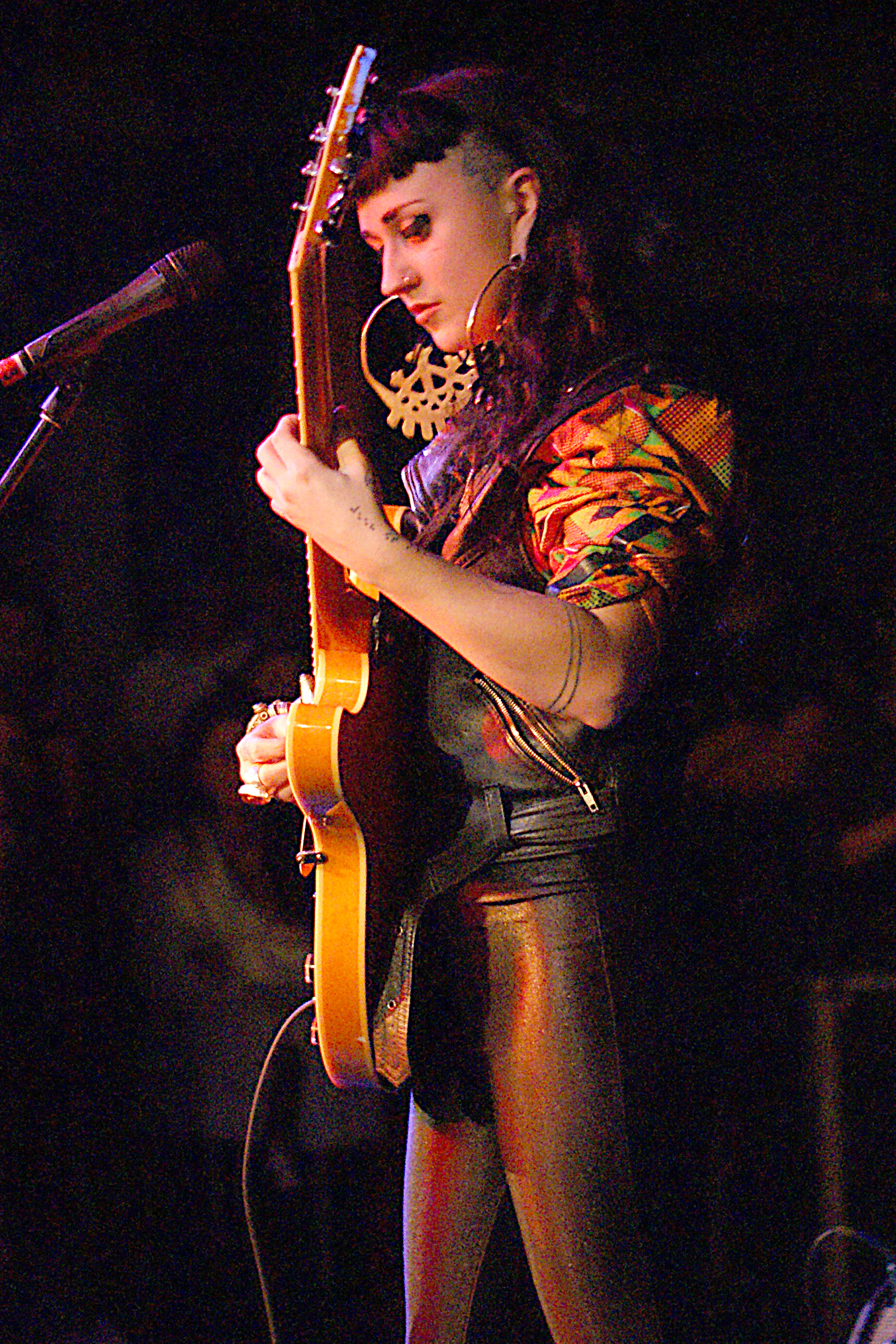
- Nai Palm in 2015

Background information
- Born: Naomi Saalfield; 1989 (age 36–37); Melbourne, Australia
- Genres: Neo soul; future soul; jazz-funk
- Occupations: Singer; songwriter; guitarist; pianist; musician
- Years active: 2011–present
- Labels: Flying Buddha; Sony Masterworks
- Member of: Hiatus Kaiyote
- Website: naipalm.com

Naomi Saalfield, known professionally as Nai Palm, is an Australian musician from Melbourne, best known as the lead vocalist, guitarist, and pianist for jazz-funk and neo soul band Hiatus Kaiyote.

== Early life and education ==
Nai Palm was born Naomi Saalfield, grew up in Melbourne, Australia. She and her five siblings were raised by their single mother, a choreographer and painter. Saalfield was first introduced to music by her mother, playing piano and listening to soul, flamenco, and Northwest African music. Later, her brother introduced her to classic rock staples Jimi Hendrix and Led Zeppelin. When Saalfield was 11 years old her mother died of breast cancer. Saalfield was orphaned at age 13 when her father died in a house fire.

After Saalfield's mother died, she went through the foster care system, and went to live with her aunt in Mount Beauty. She also lived for a time with a family who ran a wildlife sanctuary for native animals, where she developed a love and attachment to the natural world. Her aunt had an acoustic guitar, and Nai learned to harmonise with it.

When Saalfield was 15 years old, she moved back to Melbourne and was homeless for a time. She started using "Nai Palm" as a professional name while working as a fire performer.

== Career ==
In Melbourne, Palm began a career as a solo singer/guitarist. After one gig in 2010 she was approached by bassist Paul Bender, who had seen her performance and suggested a collaboration. The following year they formed the band Hiatus Kaiyote with drummer Perrin Moss and keyboardist Simon Mavin.

In 2012 the band opened for Taylor McFerrin in Melbourne; McFerrin later featured Nai Palm on his track "The Antidote." The band released its debut album Tawk Tomahawk independently in April 2012. The second Hiatus Kaiyote album, Choose Your Weapon, was released in May 2015. The album reached high in the Australian charts and was nominated for a Grammy Award in the United States.

In 2017, Palm released her debut solo album Needle Paw, which was possibly named after a desert flower. The album features only stripped-down vocals and guitars, and includes original tracks as well as covers of songs by David Bowie, Tamia, and Jimi Hendrix. She also worked with Australian indigenous performer Jason Guwanbal Gurruwiwi on the album. Palm explained that working on a solo album gave her greater flexibility to work on her guitar sounds and the challenge of releasing a more raw and personal record. The cover art for the album, an abstract drawing of Saalfield, was done by Chilean artist Jowy Maasdamme.

In June 2018, Palm was featured on the album Scorpion by Drake, who has spoken highly of both her and Hiatus Kaiyote. She sang on a partial cover version of "More Than a Woman" by Aaliyah, which appears at the end of Drake's "Is There More". On her working relationship with Drake, Palm told NME in 2021 that he started sending her stems and they worked together to create a mutual respect; "He picked up pretty quickly that I'm not going to sell his shit to buy a yacht."

The third Hiatus Kaiyote studio album, Mood Valiant, was released in June 2021. The album's title was inspired by Palm's mother, who owned two Valiant Safari station wagons, one white and one black, and would drive whichever would suit her mood for the day.

== Personal life and style ==
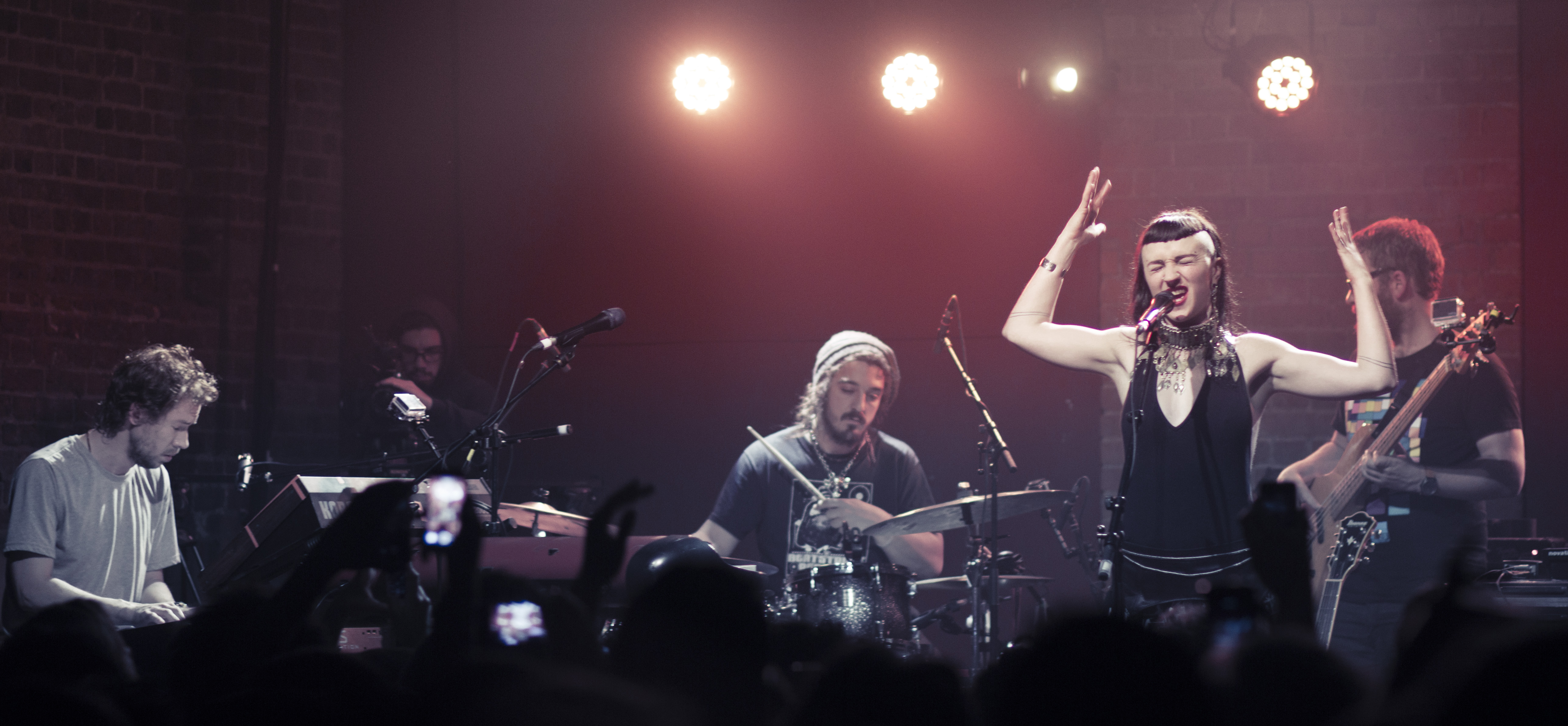
Hiatus Kaiyote performing in 2013

Palm is known for her personal style and adornment, and her self-created make-up style has been noted by fashion magazines. She has a facial tattoo that replicates a scar inflicted by a crow that she cared for as a child. As stated in an interview with Allure magazine, "The way that I adorn myself is an extension of who I am: my sense of spirituality, my sense of playfulness, my sense of curiosity in the world".

On 18 October 2018, Palm revealed that she had been diagnosed with breast cancer, the same disease that had claimed her mother's life 18 years earlier. After undergoing a mastectomy, she was cancer-free as of 2019. She opted out of breast reconstruction in the hope to challenge beauty standards, but had a decorative golden likeness modelled of her breast that she plans to wear in her stage costumes.

Palm is also known for travelling with her ring-neck parrot named Charlie Parker, which died in 2019.

== Discography ==
=== Studio albums ===
Title	Details
Needle Paw	Release: 2017; Label: Flying Buddha; Format: Digital download, CD and vinyl

== Awards and nominations ==
=== Australian Women in Music Awards ===
The Australian Women in Music Awards is an annual event that celebrates outstanding women in the Australian Music Industry who have made significant and lasting contributions in their chosen field. They commenced in 2018.

Year	Nominee / work	Award	Result	Ref.
2019	Nai Palm	Artistic Excellence Award	Nominated	

=== Music Victoria Awards ===
The Music Victoria Awards, are an annual awards night celebrating Victorian music. They commenced in 2005.

Year	Nominee / work	Award	Result	Ref.
2021	Nai Palm (Hiatus Kaiyote)	Best Musician	Nominated	
