= Ratbot (band) =

Mexican future soul band

- Origin: Mexico City
- Genres: Future Soul
- Years active: 2011–present
- Labels: NWLA; Ratbuckss
- Members: Julio Rodriguez; Marco Paul Silva
- Website: ratbot.tv

Ratbot is a future soul band from Mexico City formed in 2011. They have released three EPs featuring a sound influenced by R&B, hip hop, house, and various electronic genres.

In 2013, the band recorded at Converse Rubber Tracks Studios in Mexico City and they were also part of Converse Rubber Tracks Live playing with Phantogram and local bands Acidandali and Rey Pila.

In 2014 Ratbot played at Festival Marvin and Carnaval de Bahidorá.

== Discography ==
Extended plays

Title	Details
Got Money?	Released: April 9, 2012
WHTDRGS	Released: July 26, 2013
WRDTHGS (Remix Album)	February 28, 2014
Faces Of Meth	(TBA)
