= National Live Music Awards of 2023 =

Annual Australian music awards ceremony

- Date: 11 October 2023
- Venue: various locations across Australia

Highlights
- Most wins: Genesis Owusu and Amyl and the Sniffers (3)
- Most nominations: King Stingray and King Gizzard & the Lizard Wizard (6)
- Website: www.nlmas.com.au

The National Live Music Awards of 2023 were the 6th annual National Live Music Awards.

In December 2022, the National Live Music Awards (NLMAs) confirmed they will be back to celebrate the live sector in October 2023, after a two-year hiatus, due to the effects of the COVID-19 pandemic. The 2023 awards will reflect a lengthier eligibility period (1 September 2020 – 30 June 2023).

The events were held simultaneously across eight cities on 11 October 2023. All venues and nominees were announced on Brisbane on 5 September 2023.

== Live Legend Recipient ==
- Yothu Yindi
- Susan Heymann

== National awards ==
Nominations and wins below.

Best Live Act

Artist	Result
Amyl and the Sniffers	Won
Electric Fields	Nominated
Genesis Owusu	Nominated
King Gizzard and the Lizard Wizard	Nominated
King Stingray	Nominated

Best Live Voice

Artist	Result
Cash Savage	Nominated
Ngaiire	Nominated
Romy Vager (RVG)	Nominated
Yirrŋa Yunupiŋu (King Stingray)	Nominated
Zaachariaha Fielding (Electric Fields)	Won

Best Live Bassist

Artist	Result
Kelly-Dawn Hellmrich (Camp Cope)	Won
Lucas Harwood (King Gizzard)	Nominated
Nick Finch (Cash Savage)	Nominated
Steele Chabau (Butterfingers, James Johnston, Katie Noonan and others)	Nominated
Zoe Hauptmann	Nominated

Best Live Drummer (aka The Sheddy)

Artist	Result
Dobby	Nominated
G Flip	Won
Lewis Stiles (King Stingray)	Nominated
Talya Valenti	Nominated
Michael Cavanagh (King Gizzard and the Lizard Wizard)	Nominated
Sarah Thompson (Camp Cope)	Nominated

Best Live Guitarist

Artist	Result
Andrew Glitoris (Glitoris)	Nominated
Chloe Dadd (May-a, Peach PRC and solo)	Nominated
Joey Walker (King Gizzard and the Lizard Wizard)	Won
Roy Kellaway (King Stingray)	Nominated
Sophie McComish (Body Type)	Nominated

Best Live Instrumentalist

Artist	Result
Kirsty Tickle	Won
Laura Jean	Nominated
Lyndon Blue	Nominated
Monique Clare	Nominated
William Barton	Nominated

Best Live Music Journalist

Journalist	Result
Ellie Robinson	Nominated
Mikey Cahill	Nominated
Sosefina Fuamoli	Won
Will Oakeshott	Nominated
Zara Richards	Nominated

Best Live Music Photographer
(Presented by Beehive)

Photographer	Result
Jess Gleeson	Nominated
Jordan Munns	Nominated
Ruby Boland	Nominated
Samuel Graves	Nominated
Tashi Hall	Won

Best Stage & Light Design
(presented by Novatech)

Best Stage & Light Design	Result
Emile Frederick (Gang of Youths)	Nominated
Alex McCoy and Pat Babekuhl (Genesis Owusu)	Won
Matthew Smith and Alex 'Katzki' George (Rüfüs Du Sol)	Nominated
Rob Sinclair (Tame Impala)	Nominated
Nathan Dagostino, Nicholas Beachen and Rachael Johnston (Vera Blue)	Nominated

Best Live Music Festival or Event
(presented by The Music)

Best Live Music Festival or Even	Result
Byron Bay Bluesfest	Nominated
Dark Mofo	Won
Meredith Music Festival	Nominated
St Jerome's Laneway Festival	Nominated
Tamworth Country Music Festival	Nominated

Best International Tour in Australia
(presented by Live Event Logistics)

Tour and Promoter	Result
Angel Olsen - Big Time Tour 2023 (Supersonic)	Nominated
Ed Sheeran – +–=÷× Tour (Frontier Touring)	Nominated
Harry Styles – Love on Tour (Live Nation)	Nominated
Nick Cave and Warren Ellis - Australian Carnage Tour (Supersonic)	Won
Sleaford Mods - AUS Tour 2023 (Handsome Tours)	Nominated

Musicians Making a Difference

Name	Result	Rationale
Baker Boy	Won	For his work in celebrating the Yolŋu languages through music and connecting First Nations young people in remote communities to their potential.
Big hART & Songs for Freedom	Nominated	For their advocacy work in raising awareness of the disproportionate incarceration rates of Aboriginal children in Australian prisons through their national touring production.
Prinnie Stevens	Nominated	For celebrating the historic power of the female voice and the transformation of pain into music through her album and stage show, Lady Sings the Blues
G-Flip	Nominated	For their advocacy work in encouraging conversation about gender identity.
Josh Pyke	Nominated	For championing indigenous languages through music in primary schools while raising funds through Busking for Change.

== National Genre Awards ==
Best Blues & Roots Act

Artist	Result
Fools	Nominated
Hussy Hicks	Nominated
Jack Biilmann & The Black Tide	Nominated
Sweet Talk	Nominated
The Teskey Brothers	Won

Best Classical Act

Artist	Result
Australian String Quartet	Nominated
Australian Vocal Ensemble (AVÉ) (featuring Katie Noonan, Fiona Campbell, Andrew Goodwin and Andrew O'Connor)	Nominated
Ensemble Offspring	Nominated
Sydney Symphony Orchestra	Nominated
Tasmanian Symphony Orchestra	Won

Best Country Act

Artist	Result
Caitlin Harnett & The Pony Boys	Won
Hana and Jessie-Lee's Bad Habits	Nominated
Mark Curtis and the Flannelettes	Nominated
Siobhan Cotchin	Nominated
The Weeping Willows	Nominated

Best DJ/Electronic Act

Artist	Result
Elle Shimada	Nominated
Lastlings	Nominated
Rüfüs Du Sol	Won
Slumberjack	Nominated
Tijuana Cartel	Nominated

Best Folk Act

Artist	Result
Ben Salter	Nominated
Charm of Finches	Nominated
Emily Wurramara	Won
Melody Pool	Nominated
Naomi Keyte	Nominated

Best Hard Rock or Heavy Metal Act
(Presented by HEAVY)

Artist	Result
C.O.F.F.I.N	Won
Glitoris	Nominated
Polaris	Nominated
Rocky's Pride & Joy	Nominated
Voyager	Nominated

Best Hip Hop Act

Artist	Result
1300	Nominated
Baker Boy	Nominated
Barkaa	Nominated
Genesis Owusu	Won
Tkay Maidza	Nominated

Best Indie/Rock/Alternative Act

Artist	Result
Ball Park Music	Won
Cash Savage and the Last Drinks	Nominated
DMA's	Nominated
King Gizzard and the Lizard Wizard	Nominated
RVG	Nominated

Best Jazz Act

Artist	Result
Cigany Weaver	Nominated
Grievous Bodily Calm	Nominated
Hiatus Kaiyote	Won
Mildlife	Nominated
Shaolin Afronauts	Nominated

Best Pop Act

Artist	Result
Amy Shark	Nominated
Electric Fields	Nominated
Peach PRC	Nominated
Thelma Plum	Won
Vera Blue	Nominated

Best Punk/Hardcore Act
(Presented by HEAVY)

Artist	Result
Amyl and the Sniffers	Won
Cable Ties	Nominated
Pinch Points	Nominated
Private Function	Nominated
Sly Withers	Nominated

Best R&B or Soul Act

Artist	Result
Budjerah	Nominated
Emma Donovan and the Putbacks	Nominated
Mo'Ju	Won
Ngaiire	Nominated
THNDO	Nominated

== State and Territory awards ==
ACT Awards
Best Live Act in the ACT (Presented by BMA Magazine)	Result
Apricot Ink	Nominated
ARCHIE	Nominated
dogworld	Nominated
Genesis Owusu	Won
Glitoris	Nominated
Live Voice in the ACT	Result
Cormac McKahey (Sonic Reducer)	Won
Keven 007 (Glitoris)	Nominated
Kim Yang	Nominated
Lucy Sugerman	Nominated
Tasha Nauenburg (Bad Lunar)	Nominated
Best Venue in the ACT	Result (win only)
The Basement	Won
Best Live Event in the ACT (Presented by Oztix)	Result (win only)
Loading Zone – Sideway	Won

Northern Territory Awards
Best Live Act in the NT	Result
Caiti Baker	Nominated
Katanga Junior	Nominated
King Stingray	Won
Ngulmiya	Nominated
Southeast Desert Metal Band	Nominated
Live Voice in the NT	Result
Aidan Lijanga (Katanga Junior)	Won
Alice Cotton	Nominated
Caiti Baker	Nominated
Ngulmiya Nundhirribala	Nominated
Yirrŋa Yunupiŋu (King Stingray)	Nominated
Best Venue in the NT	Result (win only)
Darwin Railway Club	Won
Best Live Event in the NT (Presented by Oztix)	Result (win only)
Darwin Festival	Won

NSW Awards
Best Live Act in NSW (Presented by 2SER)	Result
1300	Nominated
Body Type	Nominated
DMA's	Won
Dust	Nominated
Ngaiire	Nominated
Live Voice in NSW	Result
Andy Golledge	Nominated}
Budjerah	Nominated
Georgia Mulligan	Nominated
Milan Ring	Nominated
Vera Blue	Won
Best Venue in NSW	Result (win only)
Enmore Theatre	Won
Best Live Event in NSW (Presented by Oztix)	Result (win only)
Mardi Gras Fair Day	Won

Queensland Awards
Best Live Act in QLD (Presented by 4ZZZ)	Result
Ball Park Music	Won
Cigany Weaver	Nominated
Full Flower Moon Band	Nominated
Jaguar Jonze	Nominated
WAAX	Nominated
Live Voice in QLD	Result
Asha Jefferies	Nominated
Deena Lynch (Jaguar Jonze)	Nominated
Jesswar	Nominated
Katie Noonan	Won
Marie DeVita (WAAX)	Nominated
Best Venue in QLD (Presented by Red Octopus)	Result (win only)
The Tivoli	Won
Best Live Event in QLD (Presented by Oztix)	Result (win only)
Woodford Folk Festival	Won

South Australian Awards
Best Live Act in SA (Presented by City of Adelaide)	Result
Electric Fields	Nominated
Slowmango	Nominated
Teenage Joans	Nominated
The Empty Threats	Won
West Thebarton	Nominated
Live Voice in SA (Presented by Three D Radio)	Result
Alana Jagt	Nominated
Carla Lippis	Won
Naomi Keyte (The Transatlantics)	Nominated
Stellie	Nominated
Zaachariaha Fielding (Electric Fields)	Nominated
Best Venue in SA (Presented by Red Octopus)	Result (win only)
The Gov	Won
Best Live Event in SA (Presented by Oztix)	Result (win only)
WOMADelaide	Won

Tasmanian Awards
Best Live Act in Tasmania (Presented by City of Hobart)	Result
Grace Chia	Nominated
Lennon Wells	Nominated
Luca Brasi	Won
The Native Cats	Nominated
Threats	Nominated
Live Voice in Tasmania (Presented by Simple)	Result
Ben Salter	Nominated
Christopher Coleman	Nominated
Claire Anne Taylor	Won
Emily Wurramara	Nominated
Tasha Zappala	Nominated
Best Venue in Tasmania (Presented by Edge Radio)	Result (win only)
The Odeon Theatre	Won
Best Live Event in Tasmania (Presented by Oztix)	Result (win only)
Dark Mofo	Won

Victorian Awards
Best Live Act in Victoria (Presented by SYN Media)	Result
Amyl and the Sniffers	Won
BIG WETT	Nominated
Emma Donovan and the Putbacks	Nominated
Floodlights	Nominated
King Gizzard and the Lizard Wizard	Nominated
Live Voice in Victoria (Presented by Music Victoria)	Result
Emma Donovan	Nominated
Georgia Maq (Camp Cope)	Nominated
Julia Jacklin	Won
Sampa The Great	Nominated
THNDO	Nominated
Best Venue in Victoria	Result (win only)
Forum Theatre	Won
Best Live Event in Victoria (Presented by Oztix)	Result (win only)
Meredith Music Festival	Won

West Australian Awards – Presented by Dailymotion
Best Live Act in WA (Presented by RTRFM)	Result
Alter Boy	Won
Dulcie	Nominated
Spacey Jane	Nominated
Tame Impala	Nominated
The Kill Devil Hills	Nominated
Live Voice in WA	Result
Anesu	Nominated
Brendon Humphries (The Kill Devil Hills)	Nominated
Carla Geneve	Won
Noah Dillon	Nominated
Siobhan Cotchin	Nominated
Best Venue in WA (Presented by Edge Radio)	Result (win only)
Mojo's Bar	Won
Best Live Event in WA (Presented by Oztix)	Result (win only)
Nannup Music Festival	Won
