= Mood Valiant =

Studio album by Hiatus Kaiyote
- Released: 25 June 2021
- Recorded: 2020–2021
- Genre: Neo soul; alternative R&B
- Length: 42:40
- Label: Brainfeeder
- Producer: Arthur Verocai

Hiatus Kaiyote chronology
Choose Your Weapon (2015)	Mood Valiant (2021)	Love Heart Cheat Code (2024)

Mood Valiant is the third studio album by Australian neo-soul quartet Hiatus Kaiyote, released in 2021 on Brainfeeder.

The album peaked at number 4 on the ARIA charts. At the 2021 ARIA Music Awards, the album was nominated for Best Soul/R&B Release. At the 2021 Music Victoria Awards, the album was nominated for Best Victorian Album. At the AIR Awards of 2022, the album won Best Independent Jazz Album or EP. Mood Valiant was nominated for Best Progressive R&B Album at the 64th Annual Grammy Awards.

== Background ==
Singer/guitarist Nai Palm revealed on 18 October 2018 that she had been diagnosed with breast cancer. She composed many of the songs that would later appear on Mood Valiant during the period of her treatment and noted how her diagnoses changed her perspective on life, a theme explored on the album.

The title of the album was inspired by Nai Palm's mother, who owned two Valiant Safari station wagons, one white and one black, and would drive whichever would suit her mood for the day.

== Critical reception ==
Professional ratings
Aggregate scores
Source	Rating
AnyDecentMusic?	7.8/10
Metacritic	84/100
Review scores
Source	Rating
AllMusic	4.5/5 stars
Beats Per Minute	79/100
Clash	8/10
Gigwise	8/10 stars
NME	4/5 stars
The Observer	3/5 stars
Pitchfork	7.3/10
PopMatters	9/10
Rolling Stone	4.5/5 stars

Mood Valiant received critical acclaim, with critics praising their emotional richness, arrangement, effortless melodies, soulful vocals, and liveliness. At Metacritic, which assigns a normalized rating out of 100 to reviews from mainstream publications, the album received an average score of 84 based on 7 sources, indicating "universal acclaim".

Pitchfork reviewer Aldan Jackson felt that Mood Valiant was "the first Hiatus Kaiyote album that doesn’t sound like merely a recorded live set" and "their best album yet". Tyler Jenke of Rolling Stone described the album as containing "hypnotic, almost kaleidoscopic compositions". Rebecca Sibley of Clash said that the album is "a strong follow-up to Choose Your Weapon and a perfect soundtrack for the summer" with its "rich, colourful soundscapes, tropical atmosphere, and lead singer Nai Palm’s soulful voice".

== Awards and nominations ==
Mood Valiant awards and nominations
Year	Award	Category	Result	Ref.
2021	ARIA Music Awards	Best Soul/R&B Release	Nominated	

== Track listing ==
All lyrics are written by Nai Palm; all music is composed by Nai Palm, Paul Bender, Perrin Moss, Simon Mavin.

Mood Valiant track listing
No.	Title	Length
1.	"Flight of the Tiger Lily"	0:35
2.	"Sip into Something Soft"	1:42
3.	"Chivalry Is Not Dead"	3:26
4.	"And We Go Gentle"	3:23
5.	"Get Sun" (feat. Arthur Verocai)	5:37
6.	"All the Words We Don't Say"	5:06
7.	"Hush Rattle"	0:41
8.	"Rose Water"	3:59
9.	"Red Room"	3:52
10.	"Sparkle Tape Break Up"	5:15
11.	"Stone or Lavender"	5:29
12.	"Blood and Marrow"	3:29
Total length:		42:40

Japanese edition (bonus track)
No.	Title	Length
13.	"Stone and Lavender" (Duet Version)

== Personnel ==
- Nai Palm – guitar, vocals
- Paul Bender – bass
- Simon Mavin – keyboards
- Perrin Moss – drums

== Charts ==
Chart performance for Mood Valiant
Chart (2021)	Peak position
Australian Albums (ARIA)	4
German Albums (Offizielle Top 100)	30
Swiss Albums (Schweizer Hitparade)	82
UK Albums (OCC)	54
US Billboard 200	103
US Independent Albums (Billboard)	9
US Heatseekers Albums (Billboard)	1
US Indie Store Album Sales (Billboard)	15
US Top Alternative Albums (Billboard)	8
