= The Weeping Willows =

Australian country music band

- Origin: Australia
- Genres: Country music
- Instrument: Vocals
- Years active: 2012–present
- Members: Andrew Wrigglesworth; Laura Coates
- Website: www.theweepingwillows.com.au

The Weeping Willows are an Australian country music duo, formed in 2012 consisting of Andrew Wrigglesworth and Laura Coates. They have released three studio albums, The Weeping Willows (2012), Before Darkness Comes A-Callin (2016) and You Reap What You Sow (2022).

== History ==
The Weeping Willows released their debut single "Hold On" in 2012. This was followed by their debut studio album, The Weeping Willows in December 2012.

Between 2017 and 2022, The Weeping Willows were nominated for 10x Country Music Awards of Australia, 4x Country Music Channel (CMC) awards, 2x Australian Folk Music Awards (AFMAs) and Country Live Act of the Year at the National Live Music Awards (NLMAs).

In March 2022, the duo released their studio album, You Reap What You Sow which was recorded, engineered and mixed by Ryan Freeland at Los Angeles' Stampede Origin Studio.

== Members ==
- Andrew Wrigglesworth (guitar, ganjo, lead vocals)
- Laura Coates (lead vocals)

== Discography ==
=== Albums ===
List of studio albums, with release date and label shown
Title	Album details	Peak chart positions
Title	Album details	AUS Country
Til the North Wind Blows	Released: December 2012; Label: The Weeping Willows; Formats: CD, digital download, streaming	–
Before Darkness Comes A-Callin'	Released: 8 April 2016; Label: The Weeping Willows (TWWCD01); Formats: CD, digital download, streaming	–
You Reap What You Sow	Released: 4 March 2022; Label: Compass Brothers, Universal Music Australia (4546735); Formats: CD, digital download, streaming, LP	8

=== Extended plays ===
List of EPs, with release date and label shown
Title	EPs details	Peak chart positions
Title	EPs details	AUS Country
Southern Gothic	Released: June 2021; Label: The Weeping Willows; Formats: digital download, streaming	–

== Awards and nominations ==
=== CMA Awards ===
The Country Music Awards of Australia is an annual awards night held in January during the Tamworth Country Music Festival, celebrating recording excellence in the Australian country music industry. They commenced in 1973.

Year	Nominee / work	Award	Result	Ref.
2017	"The Girl, The Bottle, The Memory" (written by Nick Wolfe)	Song of the Year	Nominated	
2017	The Weeping Willows	New Talent of the Year	Nominated	
2017	The Weeping Willows	Group or Duo of the Year	Nominated	
2017	Before Darkness Comes A-Callin'	Alternative Country Album of the Year	Nominated	
2017	"River of Gold"	Bluegrass Recording of the Year	Nominated	
2019	"The Roses Fall" (featuring Allan Caswell)	Bluegrass Recording of the Year	Nominated	
2021	"Prelude"	Instrumental of the Year	Won	
2021	"Wheels Won't Roll"	Bluegrass Recording of the Year	Nominated	
2022	"Southern Gothic"	Instrumental of the Year	Won	
2022	"Black Crow"	Bluegrass Recording of the Year	Won	
2023	The Weeping Willows	Group or Duo of the year	Nominated	
2023	You Reap What you Sow	Alternative Country Album of the Year	Nominated	
2023	"House of Sin"	Bluegrass Recording of the Year	Nominated	
2023	"Lynchburg Until This Song Ends"	Bluegrass Recording of the Year’	Nominated	

=== Music Victoria Awards ===
The Music Victoria Awards are an annual awards night celebrating Victorian music. They commenced in 2006.

Year	Nominee / work	Award	Result	Ref.
2021	The Weeping Willows	Best Country Act	Won	
2022	The Weeping Willows	Best Country Work	Nominated	

=== National Live Music Awards ===
The National Live Music Awards (NLMAs) commenced in 2016 to recognise contributions to the live music industry in Australia.

Year	Nominee / work	Award	Result	Ref.
2019	The Weeping Willows	Live Country Act of the Year	Nominated	
2023	The Weeping Willows	Best Country Act	Nominated	
