= Far Enough =

Studio album by Cable Ties
- Released: 15 January 2020
- Genre: Punk rock; garage rock
- Length: 42:56
- Label: Poison City
- Producer: Paul Maybury

Cable Ties chronology
Cable Ties (2017)	Far Enough (2020)	Live at the Scrap Museum (2023)

Far Enough is the second studio album by Australian punk rock band Cable Ties, released through Poison City Records on 15 January 2020, It received generally favourable reviews from critics.

== Critical reception ==
Professional ratings
Aggregate scores
Source	Rating
Metacritic	75/100
Review scores
Source	Rating
AllMusic	4/5 stars
Paste	7.6/10
Pitchfork	6.4/10

Far Enough received a score of 75 out of 100 on review aggregator Metacritic based on eight critics' reviews, indicating "generally favorable" reception. Mojo felt that the album "takes the most exhilarating form of resistance, much more than riot grrrl's DIY aesthetic, akin to a harder-rocking Sleater Kinney with a similarly wailing centrifugal force in singer/guitarist Jenny McKechnie", while Q described it as "authoritative, direct and exhilarating". Classic Rock called it "raw, explosive and edgy" and Uncut remarked that the "shouty threesome's hit-rate is good".

Fred Thomas of AllMusic wrote that singer "McKenchie's anger boils but it also has moments of quieter, more thoughtful bubbling, revealing a deeper emotional palette than righteous indignation, as well as a musical depth that reaches beyond punk's quick-burning bombast" and that the album "is fun and cathartic on par with any good high-energy rock band and "when [its] punk vitriol meets reflective, thoughtful expression, Far Enough grows more intriguing and compelling". Arielle Gordon of Pitchfork opined that "the record often leans on familiar garage-rock tropes, so much so that it often dips into homogeneity and predictability. But the band also leaves plenty of room for McKechnie’s booming vocals, by far the band's most impactful instrument". Paste's Max Freedman stated that "McKechnie's fanged, righteous wail and fire-hot power chords recall the heyday of riot grrrl if the movement were updated to address specific 2020 concerns while offering profound new insights into the very issues that first drove punk's most revolutionary subgenre".

== Track listing ==
Far Enough track listing
No.	Title	Length
1.	"Hope"	6:43
2.	"Tell Them Where to Go"	4:02
3.	"Sandcastles"	4:18
4.	"Lani"	7:26
5.	"Not My Story"	4:20
6.	"Self-Made Man"	3:43
7.	"Anger's Not Enough"	6:59
8.	"Pillow"	5:25
Total length:		42:56
