= Hi, It's Nice to Meet Me =

Studio album by Mia Wray
- Released: 14 March 2025
- Length: 42:02
- Label: Mushroom
- Producer: Seton Daunt; Future Cut; Ash Howes; Paul Meehan; Brian Rawling; Soap; Thrones

Mia Wray chronology
Stay Awake (2023)	Hi, It's Nice to Meet Me (2025)

Singles from Hi, It's Nice to Meet Me
- 1. "Tell Her" Released: 27 October 2023; 2. "What If" Released: 5 April 2024; 3. "The Way She Moves" Released: 2 August 2024; 4. "Nice to Meet Me" Released: 25 October 2024; 5. "Fake a Smile" Released: 22 November 2024; 6. "Not Enough" Released: 17 January 2025; 7. "Sad But True" Released: 28 February 2025

Hi, It's Nice to Meet Me is the debut studio album by Australian singer-songwriter Mia Wray. It was announced in October 2024 and released on 14 March 2025.

About the title, Wray said in October 2024, "The first thing I had in my notes was that I felt like I was saying hello to myself for the first time in a really long time. 'Hi, it's nice to meet me just kept coming up in my brain as a theme. I thought it was cool and unique".

The album was supported by several dates in Europe in February 2025 and by the Australian tour, from March to May 2025.

At the 2025 ARIA Music Awards, the album was nominated for Michael Gudinski Breakthrough Artist.

The album was nominated for the 2025 Australian Music Prize.

== Critical reception ==
Professional ratings
Review scores
Source	Rating
The AU Review	4.5/5 stars
Rolling Stone Australia	4/5 stars
Clash	7/10 stars

Dylan Marshall from The AU Review called the album "[a] fun, expansive and exploratory first up album from Mia Wray that will hold a special and formative place in many young people's lives." Neil Griffiths from Rolling Stone Australia said the album contains "glistening pop tunes, emotion and a brilliant showcase of different genres, from bedroom-pop to alt-indie to rock."

Emma Driver from Women in Pop said "Wray's debut is no ordinary first album. Arriving more than a decade after she signed a publishing deal with Mushroom Music as a sixteen-year-old, Hi, It's Nice to Meet Me has a pop sparkle that is deepened by Wray's experiences writing, recording and touring over the last decade or so."

Lucy Skeet from When the Horn Blows described the album as "energetic and joyful" and named "What If" as her "personal favourite song".

Robin Murray from Clash said "Initially earning attention in a more folk-derived lane, Mia Wray's patient road through music has allowed her to take on a number of different influences. As a result, her debut album is a pop pot pourri – a dash of Taylor here, a smidgeon of Florence, perhaps, or even a seasoning of Lorde. It's fun, easy on the ear and the perfect foil for the lyrics, with words that wind a path through heartbreak, self-doubt, longing, and – finally – a cathartic self-awareness."

JB Hi-Fi described it as "an uplifting, empowering and relatable listen".

Tyler Jenke from The Music said "Much like her own sense of musical self-discovery, the nascent album is a tale of self-discovery for Wray. It's an empowering record that features material tracing back to 2018 as Wray goes deep into her experience of falling in love, discovering she was queer, and ultimately meeting her true self for the first time." Jenke called it "a solid album, one rooted in self-assuredness despite any of the fears and pressures that may have bubbled away behind the scenes."

== Track listing ==
Hi, It's Nice to Meet Me track listing
No.	Title	Writer(s)	Producer(s)	Length
1.	"Nice to Meet Me"	Mia Wray; Georgia Flipo; Aidan Hogg	Future Cut	3:04
2.	"Tell Her"	Wray; Gabrielle Aplin; Seton Daunt; Ash Howes	Daunt; Howes	3:12
3.	"Sad but True"	Wray; Dave Hammer; Dann Hume	Future Cut	3:36
4.	"What If"	Wray; Joshua Nobel; Karl Ziegler	Soap	3:28
5.	"The Way She Moves"	Wray; Will Homewood; Hume; Paul Meehan	Meehan; Brian Rawling	3:00
6.	"Only Love"	Wray; Iyiola Babalola; Hume; Darren Lewis; Nicole Morier	Future Cut	4:19
7.	"Fake a Smile"	Wray; Hume; KIN; Julia Sykes	Future Cut	3:39
8.	"Get Out My Way"	Wray	Future Cut	3:13
9.	"Not Enough"	Wray; Rob Amorouso; Hume; Pip Norman	Future Cut	3:37
10.	"Not the Same as Yesterday"	Wray; Mike Kintish	Future Cut	3:12
11.	"Ghost In My Machine"	Wray; Aplin; Daunt; Howes	Future Cut	3:52
12.	"Everybody Knows"	Wray; Andrew Lowden	Thrones	3:50
Total length:				42:02

== Charts ==
Chart performance for Hi, It's Nice to Meet Me
Chart (2025)	Peak position
Australian Albums (ARIA)	26
