= All Her Plans =

Studio album by Cable Ties
- Released: 23 June 2023
- Genres: Punk rock; post-punk
- Length: 35:39
- Label: Poison City
- Producer: Paul Maybury

Cable Ties chronology
Live at the Scrap Museum (2022)	All Her Plans (2023)

All Her Plans is the third studio album by Australian punk rock band Cable Ties, released through Poison City Records on 23 June 2023. It was preceded by the release of the singles "Perfect Client" and "Time for You", and received generally favourable reviews from critics. At the 2023 Music Victoria Awards, the album was nominated for Best Album.

== Critical reception ==
Professional ratings
Aggregate scores
Source	Rating
Metacritic	84/100
Review scores
Source	Rating
The Line of Best Fit	8/10
NME	4/5 stars

All Her Plans received a score of 84 out of 100 on review aggregator Metacritic based on four critics' reviews, indicating "generally favorable" reception. Mojo called it "excellent" and felt it "aligns with riot grrrl-era pop for its force and intelligence", while Uncut remarked that it is "hardly groundbreaking, but bursting with charm". Glide Magazine's Shawn Donohue described it as a "nuanced blast of post-punkish rock as the group reaches [its] highest summits yet", writing that the band "use their intriguing mix of punk, rock, and post-punk dance vibes with an assured delivery throughout" and have "committed songwriting, driven playing, and compelling vocal styles".

John Amen of The Line of Best Fit found that Cable Ties "move fluidly from sculpted accompaniments to expressive jams" and "the result is a set that brims with sonic fury, winning melodies, and wry cultural critiques". Amen concluded that they also "interweave descriptive lyrics, [and have] a knack for melody, and instrumentation that, while grounded in the punk playbook, also accommodates the trio's diverse musical interests". Giselle Au-Nhien Nguyen of NME wrote that the album "harnesses the band's signature rage as they pummel through songs that are equally frantic and tender, veering from expressing frustration with the status quo to heartfelt and sincere odes to loved ones" and summarised that it is "sonically more adventurous and varied album than the band's previous output, but retains a strong sense of cohesion even as it barrels in multiple directions".

== Track listing ==
All Her Plans track listing
No.	Title	Length
1.	"Crashing Through"	4:12
2.	"Perfect Client"	2:49
3.	"Time for You"	4:11
4.	"Too Late"	4:14
5.	"Mum's Caravan"	3:44
6.	"Thoughts Back"	3:16
7.	"Silos"	3:40
8.	"Change"	3:57
9.	"Deep Breath Out"	5:36
Total length:		35:39
