= Pirritu =

- Also known as: Brett Lee
- Origin: Bourke, New South Wales, Australia
- Genres: folk
- Occupation(s): musician, songwriter, singer
- Instrument: guitar
- Labels: Heavy Machinery Records
- Website: pirritu.com

Pirritu (Brett Lee) is an Ngiyampaa musician. His debut album was released in 2021. He is based in Melbourne, Australia.

== Career ==
Pirritu was adopted by a non-Aboriginal couple as a newborn, and grew up in Bourke, New South Wales. He was able to later reconnect with his culture when he was 14. His name Pirritu means Brett in the Ngiyampaa language.

He had represented Australia as a junior triathlete, but after an injury forced him to take time away from sports, Pirritu taught himself music theory.

In 2021, Pirritu released his debut album as part of the Fast Forward festival in Melbourne. Pirritu Part 1 was pressed on vinyl and released by Heavy Machinery Records, with support from City of Melbourne.

He followed this with another album Pirritu Part 2: Fire When the Sun Goes Down in March 2023

Outside of music, he volunteers with the Ngiuyampaa Language Project, to make the language more accessible, and also deepen his own understanding.

== Discography ==
=== Albums ===
List of albums, with selected details
Title	Details
Pirritu Part 1	Released: 19 November 2021; Format: digital; Label: Brett Lee
Pirritu Part 2: Fire When the Sun Goes Down	Released: 24 March 2023; Format: digital; Label: Brett Lee

== Awards and nominations ==
=== Music Victoria Awards ===
The Music Victoria Awards are an annual awards night celebrating Victorian music. They commenced in 2006.

Year	Nominee / work	Award	Result	Ref.
2022	Pirritu	The Archie Roach Foundation Award for Emerging Talent	Nominated	
2023	Pirritu	The Archie Roach Foundation Award for Emerging Talent	Nominated	
