= 2023 Music Victoria Awards =

Annual Australian music awards ceremony

- Date: 31 October 2023
- Venue: Federation Square

Highlights
- Most nominations: Cable Ties, Forest Claudette, RVG (3)

The 2023 Music Victoria Awards are the 18th Annual Music Victoria Awards. The ceremony took place on 31 October 2023. The nominees were announced on 14 September 2023 Public voting was open from 14 September until 13 October.

== Hall of Fame inductees ==
- Kutcha Edwards
- Kirsty Rivers

== Award nominees and winners ==
Winners indicated at the top and in boldface, with other nominees in plain.

=== Public Voted Awards ===
Best Album	Best Song or Track
**Cash Savage and the Last Drinks – So This is Love**; Cable Ties – All Her Plans; Jen Cloher – I Am the River, the River Is Me; Julia Jacklin – Pre Pleasure; Teether and Kuya Neil – STRESSOR	**Julia Jacklin – "Love, Try Not to Let Go"**; Forest Claudette (featuring EARTHGANG)– "Mess Around"; Miss Kaninna – "Blak Britney"; NO ZU – "Liquid Love"; RVG – "Nothing Really Changes"
Best Group	Best DJ
**Cable Ties**; Folk Bitch Trio; Mindy Meng Wang (王萌) & Tim Shiel; RVG; Surprise Chef	**Cara Murphy**; CAITY WATSØN; Moopie; Rakhi; Uone
Best Solo Artist	Best Regional Act
**Jen Cloher**; Adalita; Forest Claudette; Gena Rose Bruce; Sarah Mary Chadwick	**Watty Thompson**; Bones and Jones; Code Chroma; Immy Owusu; Leah Senior
Best Metro Festival	Best Regional Festival
**Rising (Wurundjeri and Boonwurrung)**; Brunswick Music Festival (Wurundjeri); Leaps and Bounds Music Festival (Wurundjeri); Melbourne International Jazz Festival (Wurundjeri and Boonwurrung); Yirramboi Festival including The Archie Roach Block Party (Wurundjeri)	**Port Fairy Folk Festival (Gunditjmara)**; Boogie – Tallarook (Taungurung); Esoteric Festival – Donald (Dja Dja Wurrung); OK Motels in Charlton (Dja Dja Wurrung); Winter Sounds – Daylesford (Dja Dja Wurrung))
Best Large Venue (Metro)	Best Small Venue (Metro)
**Forum Melbourne (Wururdjeri and Boonwurrung)**; Melbourne Recital Centre (Wurundjeri); Northcote Theatre (Wurundjeri); Palais Theatre (Boonwurrung); The Corner Hotel – Richmond (Wurundjeri)	**Brunswick Ballroom (Wurundjeri)**; Northcote Social Club (Wurundjeri); Shotkickers – Thornbury (Wurunjderi); The Gem – Collingwood (Wurundjeri); The Night Cat – Fitzroy (Wurundjeri)
Best Regional Venue/Presenter (over 50 gigs a year)	Best Regional Venue/Presenter (under 50 gigs a year)
**Caravan Music Club in Archies Creek (Boonwurrung)**; Palais Hepburn (Dja Dja Wurrung); The Barwon Club Hotel in Geelong (Wadawurrung); The Bridge Hotel – Castlemaine (Dja Dja Wurrung); Volta – Ballarat (Wadawurrung)	**Meeniyan Town Hall – South Gippsland (Bunurong)**; The Minerva Ballaarat (Wadawurrung); The Blues Train – Bellarine Peninsula (Wadawurrung); Trash Cult – Bendigo (Dja Dja Wurrung); The Vine Hotel – Wangaratta (Bpangerang)

=== Industry Voted Awards ===
Arts Access Amplify Award (for Deaf and Disabled acts)	The Archie Roach Foundation Award for Emerging Talent (for First Peoples entrants only)
**Katie Dey**; Artemis Muñoz; Batts; Jimmy from Thornbury; Mathilde Anne	**Charlie Needs Braces**; Jada Weazel; Kiwat Kennell; Miss Kaninna; Pirritu
Best Musician	Best Producer
**Immy Owusu**; Daniel Farrugia; Jen Sholakis; Joshua Moshe; Sam Teskey	**Gab Strum**; Anna Laverty; Candice Lorrae; Lucy Blomkamp; Simon Lam
Best Blues Work	Best Country Work
**Damon Smith**; Eddie Ink; Nigel Wearne; Paul Buchanan's Voodoo Preachers; The Teskey Brothers	**Matt Joe Gow**; Charlotte Le Lievre; De Porsal; Henry Wagons; Nathan Seeckts
Best Electronic Work	Best Experimental Act or Avant-Garde Work
**Close Counters**; Lastlings; Memphis LK; The Oddness; Tim Shiel	**Maria Moles**; Aviva Endean; Fia Fiell; Patrick Hartono; R. Rebeiro
Best Folk Work	Best Heavy Work
**Lucy Wise**; Dandelion Wine; Folk Bitch Trio; Katankin; Leah Senior	**ISUA**; Dead; Faceless Burial; GELD; The Maggie Pills
Best Hip Hop Work	Best Jazz Work
**Agung Mango**; Strictly D.T; Teether & Kuya Neil; Voldy; Yung Shōgun	**Joshua Moshe**; Don Glori; Fran Swinn; Nat Bartsch; The Rookies
Best Pop Work	Best Reggae and Dancehall Work
**Daine**; Mia Wray; Mitch Tambo; Monnie; Telenova	**Killah Keys**; ALETHIA; Crown Heights; JahWise; Melbourne Ska Orchestra
Best Rock/Punk Work	Soul, Funk, RNB & Gospel Work
**Cable Ties**; Cash Savage and the Last Drinks; Civic; CLAMM; RVG	**Bumpy**; 30/70; Forest Claudette; Mo'Ju; Surprise Chef
MAV Diasporas Award (Culturally and Linguistically Diverse entrants only)	
**Origami with Wang Zheng-Ting**; Black Jesus Experience; Don Glori; Mitch Tambo; The Cloud Maker	
