= Hiatus Kaiyote =

Australian jazz-funk band

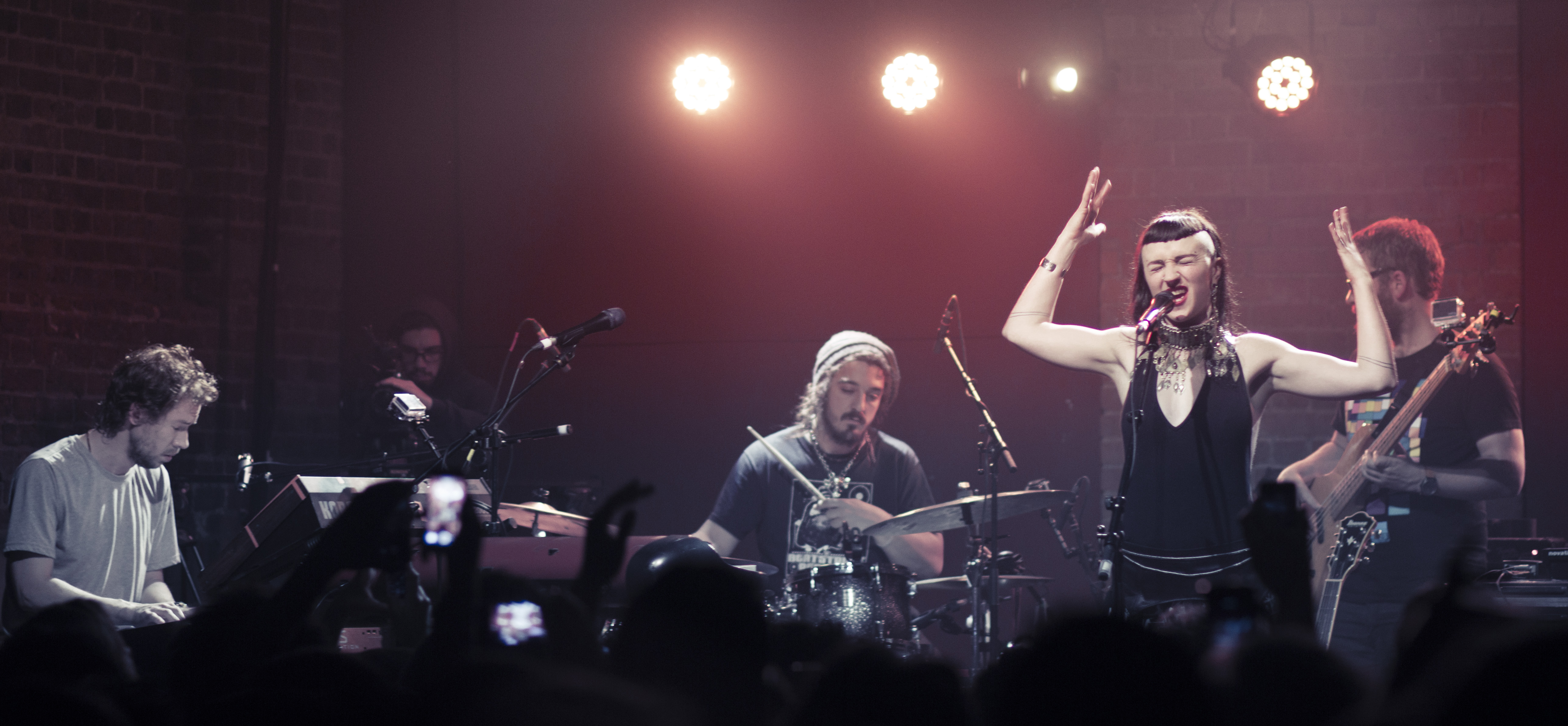
- Hiatus Kaiyote performing in 2013 (L–R: Simon Mavin, Perrin Moss, Nai Palm, Paul Bender)

Background information
- Origin: Melbourne, Victoria, Australia
- Genres: wondercore; Neo soul; future soul; jazz-funk; blue-eyed soul; hip-hop; psychedelic
- Years active: 2011–present
- Labels: Flying Buddha; Sony Masterworks; Brainfeeder; Ninja Tune
- Members: Nai Palm; Paul Bender; Perrin Moss; Simon Mavin
- Website: hiatuskaiyote.com

Hiatus Kaiyote (/haɪˈeɪtəs keɪˈjoʊti/ hy-AY-təs kay-YOH-tee) is an Australian jazz/funk/R&B/soul band formed in Melbourne in 2011, made up of singer/guitarist Nai Palm, bassist Paul Bender, keyboardist Simon Mavin, and drummer Perrin Moss. Their albums include Tawk Tomahawk (2012), Choose Your Weapon (2015), Mood Valiant (2021), and Love Heart Cheat Code (2024).

They have been nominated for many awards, were the first Australian act to be nominated for a Grammy in an R&B category, and won an AIR Award, several Music Victoria Awards, and a National Live Music Award. Since 2016, their music has been sampled by a number of prominent artists, including Anderson Paak, Beyoncé, Jay-Z, Drake, and Kendrick Lamar. In celebration of their 15 years together, Hiatus Kaiyote are doing a series of headline shows in 2026.

== History ==
=== 2011–2013: Formation and Tawk Tomahawk ===
In 2010, Nai Palm (born Naomi Saalfield) performed a solo show in Melbourne that was witnessed by Paul Bender. After the show, Bender approached Palm and suggested a collaboration. After working as a duo for a short time, they recruited Perrin Moss and Simon Mavin in 2011 and formed Hiatus Kaiyote. Mavin was then a member of The Bamboos but left that band to focus on Hiatus Kaiyote.

Hiatus Kaiyote played their first gig at the 2011 Bohemian Masquerade Ball among sword swallowers, fire twirlers, and gypsy deathcore bands. In February 2012, the band opened for Taylor McFerrin in Melbourne. McFerrin was so impressed with them that he introduced their music to influential broadcaster and record label owner DJ Gilles Peterson.

The band released their debut album Tawk Tomahawk independently in April 2012. The record is musically eclectic, with songs that incorporate genres from across the musical spectrum including ambient music, rock, psychedelia, lounge music, and jazz. It was noticed by numerous musicians including Animal Collective and Dirty Projectors, and the band later received public endorsements from Erykah Badu, Questlove, and Prince, who urged their social media followers to explore the band's music. In early 2013, Gilles Peterson named them the Breakthrough Artists of the Year at his Worldwide Music Awards in London, and shortly thereafter they were introduced to Salaam Remi who had just started working as an A&R executive at Sony Music. Sony gave Remi the opportunity to start his own label, Flying Buddha, and his first signing was Hiatus Kaiyote. The band licensed Tawk Tomahawk to the label, adding an updated version of the song "Nakamarra" featuring Q-Tip. Following this release, the band toured internationally, and in 2014 were nominated for a Grammy Award for Best R&B Performance for "Nakamarra." They were the first Australian act to be nominated for a Grammy in an R&B category.

=== 2014–2016: Choose Your Weapon ===
In 2014, the band began working on their second album, Choose Your Weapon, which was released on 1 May 2015. The review aggregator Metacritic gave the album a normalised rating of 87 out of 100, based on 6 reviews, indicating "universal acclaim". On 9 May 2015, Choose Your Weapon debuted at number 22 on the Australian albums chart. Nai Palm described the album as an "extension" of their debut, and stated that she and the band had no intention to make a one-genre body of work. Many of the songs on the album started with Saalfield's original ideas and were later fleshed out by the band collectively. During the recording the band wanted to pay tribute to the mixtape format, so they incorporated interludes.

Choose Your Weapon became the band's first release to chart in the US, reaching #127 on the Billboard 200, and #11 on the Billboard Top R&B/Hip-Hop Albums chart. The song "Breathing Underwater" from the album was nominated for a Best R&B Performance at the 58th Grammy Awards.

Starting in 2016, prominent rap and R&B artists began sampling Hiatus Kaiyote songs, starting with Anderson .Paak's sample of "Molasses" in "Without You" on his album Malibu. The following year, Kendrick Lamar sampled "Atari" in "Duckworth" from his album Damn, and Drake sampled "Building a Ladder" on the song "Free Smoke" from his playlist More Life. In 2018, Beyonce and Jay-Z sampled "The World It Softly Lulls" in "713" from their album Everything Is Love.

=== 2017–2019: Side projects and Mood Valiant ===
In 2017, Nai Palm released her debut solo album Needle Paw. In June 2018, Palm was featured on Scorpion by Drake, who has spoken highly of both her and the band. She sang a cover of "More Than a Woman" by Aaliyah, which appears at the end of Drake's song "Is There More?". On 18 October 2018, Palm revealed that she had been diagnosed with breast cancer. While recuperating in the hospital following a mastectomy, Palm and Bender performed a cover of Curtis Mayfield's "The Makings of You" which was released online. Palm announced in 2019 that she was cancer-free.

During Palm's recovery period, the other members of Hiatus Kaiyote formed several side projects. Perrin Moss, under the name Clever Austin, released the solo album Pareidolia in 2019. Simon Mavin formed a band called The Putbacks, and produced the album Control by Natalie Slade in 2020. Paul Bender formed an act called The Sweet Enoughs and released the album Marshmallow in 2020. Bender has also produced albums for Jaala, Vulture St. Tape Gang, and Laneous. Bender, Mavin, and Moss also released an all-instrumental album called Improvised Music 2015–17 in 2020, under the name Swooping (formerly Swooping Duck).

=== 2020–present ===
Hiatus Kaiyote reconvened in 2020 and signed a global publishing deal with Warner Chappell Music. They began work on a new album inspired by Palm's health crisis and her loss of a beloved pet, as well as the social difficulties caused by the COVID-19 pandemic. The song "Get Sun" was arranged and conducted by Brazilian musician Arthur Verocai. The album Mood Valiant was released on 25 June 2021, and reached the Top Ten on the Australian albums chart. The album was nominated for a Grammy in 2022 for Best Progressive R&B Album.

In January 2024, Hiatus Kaiyote released "Everything's Beautiful", the lead single from their fourth studio album Love Heart Cheat Code. The album was released in June 2024. In March 2025, the band's storage space in Melbourne was broken into and a large amount of musical equipment was stolen. In 2026 Nai was a mentor for fellow artist Ngaiire's Musik Blok programme in Papua New Guinea.

In July 2026, Hiatus Koyote embarked on headline shows in Brisbane, Sydney, and Melbourne to celebrate their 15th anniversary. They are scheduled to appear at Darwin Festival on 23 August, as well as headlining the new Dingo Festival at Bangalow, New South Wales, in October 2026.

== Style ==
In 2012, their debut album Tawk Tomahawk was described as musically eclectic, with songs that incorporating ambient music, rock, psychedelia, lounge music, and jazz. In 2026, ABC music journalist Al Newstead described the band's musical style as "A vivid mix of futuristic soul, jazz, funk, R&B, and hip-hop".

Every song we make is a little world and contains a multitude of influences. Although some may refer to our songs as R&B in one moment, and electronica or proggy-tropicalia in another, we don't think about sounds in terms of genres, but look at them more from a cinematic way. We're always trying to get to that moment where people are overwhelmed in joy, in confusion, in sadness, or in the magnitude of emotion or disbelief – as well as sometimes feeling all of these simultaneously. We like to call this "wondercore", and that's what we're always aiming for as a group.

— Hiatus Kaiyote in Music Business Worldwide

== Discography ==
=== Albums ===
Title	Details	Peak chart positions			
Title	Details	AUS	GER	UK	US
Tawk Tomahawk	Released: 1 April 2012; Label: Flying Buddha; Formats: Digital download, CD, LP	—	—	—	—
Choose Your Weapon	Released: 1 May 2015; Label: Flying Buddha, Sony; Formats: Digital download, CD, LP, streaming	22	—	—	127
Mood Valiant	Released: 25 June 2021; Label: Brainfeeder; Formats: Digital download, CD, streaming, LP	4	30	54	103
Love Heart Cheat Code	Released: 28 June 2024; Label: Brainfeeder, Ninja Tune	40	—	—	—

=== Remix albums ===
Title	Album details
Tawk Takeout (Tawk Tomahawk Remixed)	Released: September 20, 2012; Label: Wondercore Island; Format: Digital download
Mood Variant (The Remixes)	Released: April 8, 2022; Label: Brainfeeder; Format: Digital download, streaming

=== Extended plays ===
List of EPs, with release date and label shown
Title	Details
Live in Revolt	Released: 18 October 2013; Label: Pineapple Spaceship Pty Ltd; Formats: Digital download
Recalibrations Vol.1	Released: 15 April 2016; Label: Flying Buddha, Sony; Formats: Digital download, CD, LP

=== Music videos ===
- "Jekyll" (2012)
- "Lace Skull" (2013)
- "Nakamarra" (2013)
- "Breathing Underwater" (2015)
- "Red Room" (2021)
- "Get Sun" (2021)
- "And We Go Gentle" (2021)
- “Canopic Jar” (2021)

=== Prominent samples ===
- Anderson Paak: "Without You" from Malibu (2016) samples "Molasses"
- Kendrick Lamar: "Duckworth" from Damn (2017) samples "Atari"
- Drake: "Free Smoke" from More Life (2017) samples "Building A Ladder"
- Beyonce and Jay-Z as The Carters: "713" from Everything is Love (2018) samples "The World It Softly Lulls" live performance in 2013
- Teyana Taylor: "69" from The Album (2020) samples "Borderline With My Atoms"

== Awards and nominations ==
=== AIR Awards ===
The Australian Independent Record Awards (commonly known informally as AIR Awards) is an annual awards night to recognise, promote and celebrate the success of Australia's Independent Music sector.

Year	Nominee / work	Award	Result	Ref.
2022	Mood Valiant	Best Independent Jazz Album or EP	Won	

=== APRA Awards ===
The APRA Awards are held in Australia and New Zealand by the Australasian Performing Right Association to recognise songwriting skills, sales and airplay performance by its members annually.

Year	Nominee / work	Award	Result	Ref.
2014	Hiatus Kaiyote	Breakthrough Songwriter of the Year	Nominated	
2016	"Borderline With My Atoms"	Song of the Year	Shortlisted	
2016	"Breathing Underwater"	Song of the Year	Shortlisted	
2022	"Red Room"	Song of the Year	Nominated	
2025	"Everything's Beautiful"	Song of the Year	Shortlisted	

=== ARIA Music Awards ===
The ARIA Music Awards is an annual awards ceremony that recognises excellence, innovation, and achievement across all genres of Australian music.

Year	Nominee / work	Award	Result	Ref.
2015	Choose Your Weapon	Best Urban Album	Nominated	
2021	Mood Valiant	Best Soul/R&B Release	Nominated	
2024	Love Heart Cheat Code	Best Group	Nominated	

=== Australian Music Prize ===
The Australian Music Prize (the AMP) is an annual award of $30,000 given to an Australian band or solo artist in recognition of the merit of an album released during the year of award. It commenced in 2005.

Year	Nominee / work	Award	Result	Ref.
2021	Mood Valiant	Australian Music Prize	Nominated	
2024	Love Heart Cheat Code	Australian Music Prize	Nominated	

=== Grammy Awards ===
The Grammy Awards is an award presented by The Recording Academy to recognise achievement in the music industry.

Year	Nominee / work	Award	Result
2014	"Nakamarra" featuring Q-Tip	Best R&B Performance	Nominated
2016	"Breathing Underwater"	Best R&B Performance	Nominated
2022	"Mood Valiant"	Best Progressive R&B Album	Nominated

=== J Awards ===
The J Awards are an annual series of Australian music awards that were established by the Australian Broadcasting Corporation's youth-focused radio station Triple J. They commenced in 2005.

Year	Nominee / work	Award	Result	Ref.
2015	Hiatus Kaiyote	Double J Artist of the Year	Nominated	
2021	Hiatus Kaiyote	Double J Artist of the Year	Nominated	

=== Music Victoria Awards ===
The Music Victoria Awards, are an annual awards night celebrating Victorian music. They commenced in 2005.

Year	Nominee / work	Award	Result	Ref.
2013	Hiatus Kaiyote	Best Emerging Artist	Won	
2013	Tawk Tomahawk	Best Soul, Funk, R'n'B and Gospel Album	Nominated	
2021	Mood Valiant	Best Victorian Album	Nominated	
2021	"Red Room"	Best Victorian Song	Won	
2021	Hiatus Kaiyote	Best Group	Nominated	
2021	Hiatus Kaiyote	Best Soul, Funk, R'n'B or Gospel Act	Nominated	
2021	Nai Palm (Hiatus Kaiyote)	Best Musician	Nominated	
2024	Hiatus Kaiyote	Best Group	Nominated	

=== National Live Music Awards ===
The National Live Music Awards (NLMAs) commenced in 2016 to recognise contributions to the live music industry in Australia.

Year	Nominee / work	Award	Result	Ref.
2016	Hiatus Kaiyote	Live R&B or Soul Act of the Year	Nominated	
2017	Hiatus Kaiyote	Live R&B or Soul Act of the Year	Nominated	
2023	Hiatus Kaiyote	Best Jazz Act	Won	

=== Rolling Stone Australia Awards ===
The Rolling Stone Australia Awards are awarded annually in January or February by the Australian edition of Rolling Stone magazine for outstanding contributions to popular culture in the previous year.

Year	Nominee / work	Award	Result	Ref.
2022	Hiatus Kaiyote	Rolling Stone Global Award	Nominated	
