= Georgia State Line =

Australian country singer

- Birth name: Georgia Delves
- Born: Bendigo, Victoria, Australia
- Genres: Country; Americana
- Occupations: Singer; songwriter
- Years active: 2016–present
- Labels: Cheatin Hearts Records
- Website: www.georgiastateline.com

Georgia Delves, known professionally and performs under the stage moniker of Georgia State Line, is an Australian singer and songwriter. Georgia State Line released their debut studio album In Colour in September 2021.

== Early life ==
Gorgia Delves was born and raised in Bendigo, Victoria, and sang in Catholic school choirs by day and performed in the local pub music scene by night. Delves later moved to Melbourne and formed a band.

== Career ==
=== 2016–2017: Career beginnings and Heaven Knowns ===
Delves and bandmate Patrick Wilson met while studying music at a university in Melbourne in 2014, forming both a romantic and professional relationship. In 2016, Delves and Wilson recruited an unofficial band to perform her songs.

In 2017, Georgia State Line released their debut single "Older Than I Am" which gained a four-star review from triple j Unearthed's Dave Ruby Howe. This was followed by the single "Heaven Knows" and an EP of the same name, which was released in July 2017.

=== 2018–present: In Colour ===
Several singles were released between 2018 and 2020. In September 2021, Georgia State Line released their debut studio album In Colour. The album was recorded by James Cecil in the Macedon Ranges and documents Delves' journey. Delves said "These songs really embody what it means to move through the pains and joy of inevitable change." In a 4 out of 5 star review, Cat Woods from NME said "In Colour is a fresh, Australian take on a time-honoured sound that harks back to the blues-and-rootsy Americana of the '50s and '60s."

The album was nominated for Best Country Album at the 2022 ARIA Music Awards.

== Discography ==
=== Albums ===
List of studio albums, with release date and label shown
Title	Details	Peak chart positions
Title	Details	AUS Country
In Colour	Released: 24 September 2021; Formats: CD, LP, download; Label: Cheatin' Heart Records, UMA (3875267)	13

=== Extended plays ===
List of extended plays, with release date and label shown
Title	Details
Heaven Knowns	Released: 7 July 2017; Label: Georgia State Line; Formats: CD, download

== Awards and nominations ==
=== ARIA Music Awards ===
The ARIA Music Awards is an annual awards ceremony that recognises excellence, innovation, and achievement across all genres of Australian music. They commenced in 1987.

Year	Nominee / work	Award	Result	Ref.
2022	In Colour	Best Country Album	Nominated	

=== Music Victoria Awards ===
The Music Victoria Awards, are an annual awards night celebrating Victorian music. They commenced in 2005.

Year	Nominee / work	Award	Result	Ref.
2021	Georgia State Line	Best Country Act	Nominated	
2022	Georgia State Line	Best Country Work	Won	
