= 2022 Music Victoria Awards =

Annual Australian music awards ceremony

- Date: 13 December 2022
- Venue: The Edge, Federation Square

Highlights
- Most wins: Baker Boy (3)
- Most nominations: Baker Boy (4)

The 2022 Music Victoria Awards are the 17th Annual Music Victoria Awards. The ceremony is scheduled to take place in December 2022.

The list of industry-voted nominees was announced on 27 October 2022 and the public voted nominees announced on 10 November 2022.

Music Victoria CEO Simone Schinkel said of the awards "Last night's Music Victoria Awards ceremony was bursting at the seams with the community, camaraderie, and solidarity that we have seen from the music community throughout the Music Victoria Awards campaign. It was an honour to witness three generations in attendance, alongside the full spectrum of the industry involved in contemporary music."

== Hall of Fame inductees ==
- Deborah Conway (AM)
- Helen Marcou (AM) and Ian McLean (AM) - founders of Bakehouse Studios
- Best Musician - Xani Kolac

== Award nominees and winners ==
Winners indicated in boldface, with other nominees in plain.

=== Public Voted Awards ===
Best Album	Best Song
**Baker Boy – Gela**; Harvey Sutherland – Boy; JAZZPARTY – Nobody Gets Away; Kerryn Fields – Water; thndo – Life in Colour	**Baker Boy – "Survive"**; Black Cab – "Rotsler's Rules"; Courtney Barnett – "Rae Street"; Guthrie – "Dickhead Song"; Julia Jacklin – "Lydia Wears a Cross"
Best Group	Best DJ
**Emma Donovan & The Putbacks**; Camp Cope; Dorsal Fins; Ramona Sky; Telenova	**MzRizk** and **Jennifer Loveless** (tie); Memphis LK; Reptant; Simon TK
Best Solo Artist	Best Regional Act
**Julia Jacklin**; Baker Boy; IJALE; Kerryn Fields; Mo'Ju	**Baker Boy**; Alice Skye; Bones and Jones; DEAD; Jess Parker
Best Metro Festival	Best Regional Festival
**Brunswick Music Festival (Wurundjeri)**; Melbourne Music Week (Wurundjeri and Boonwurrung); Peninsula Summer Music Festival (Boonwurrung); Reunion Park (Wurundjeri); Rising (Wurundjeri and Boonwurrung)	**Port Fairy Folk Festival (Gunditjmara)**; CresFest in Creswick (Dja Dja Wurrung); Meadow in Bambra (Gulidjan, Gadubanud and Wadawurrung); OK Motels in Charlton (Dja Dja Wurrung); Riverboats Music Festival in Echuca-Moama (Yorta Yorta)
Best Large Venue (Metro)	Best Small Venue (Metro)
**Forum Melbourne (Wururdjeri and Boonwurrung)**; Melbourne Recital Centre (Wurundjeri); Palais Theatre (Boonwurrung); Sidney Myer Music Bowl (Wurundjeri); The Night Cat (Wurundjeri)	**Brunswick Ballroom (Wurundjeri)**; Northcote Social Club (Wurundjeri); Shotkickers – Thornbury (Wurunjderi); The Gasometer Hotel – Collingwood (Wurundjeri); The Jazzlab – Brunswick (Wurundjeri)
Best Regional Venue/Presenter (Established)	Best Regional Venue/Presenter (under 50 gigs a year)
**Caravan Music Club in Archies Creek (Boonwurrung)**; Palais Hepburn (Dja Dja Wurrung); The Barwon Club Hotel in Geelong (Wadawurrung); The Taproom – Shedshaker Brewing in Castlemaine (Dja Dja Wurrung); Theatre Royal Castlemaine (Dja Dja Wurrung)	**Daylesford Hotel (Dja Dja Wurrung)**; Ballarat Mechanics' Institute – Minerva (Wadawurrung); Golden Vine Hotel – Bendigo (Dja Dja Wurrung); Hotel Warrnambool (Pheek Whurrong); Music on the Hill (MOTH) – Mornington Peninsula (Boonwurrung)

=== Industry Voted Awards ===
Arts Access Amplify Award (for Deaf and Disabled acts)	The Archie Roach Foundation Award for Emerging Talent
**Evelyn Ida Morris**; Batts; Between Mirrors; Nat Bartsch; Saint Ergo	**Bumpy**; Carissa Nyalu; Jess Hitchcock; MpathSoul – Monica Jasmine Karo; Pirritu
Best Blues Work	Best Country Work
**Checkerboard Lounge**; Damon Smith; High Ace; The Black Sorrows; The McNamarr Project	**Georgia State Line**; Lachlan Bryan & the Wildes; Michael Waugh; Sherry Rich; The Weeping Willows
Best Electronic Work	Best Experimental Act or Avant-Garde Work
**Harvey Sutherland**; OK EG; Papaphilia; Puscha; Various Asses	**The Amplified Elephants**; Cat Hope; Female Wizard; Nina Buchanan; Rama Parwata
Best Folk Work	Best Heavy Work
**Kerryn Fields**; Above The Bit; Austral; Charm of Finches; Ruby Gill	**Outright**; Diploid; ISUA; Jalang; Rinuwat
Best Hip Hop Work	Best Jazz Work
**MAMMOTH. & Silentjay**; Jaal; Nomad; SO.Crates; Yung Shōgun	**Barney McAll**; Claire Cross; Johannes Luebbers Dectet; Peter Knight; Sam Anning
Best Pop Work	Best Reggae and Dancehall Work
**The Stroppies**; Confidence Man; June Jones; Mug; Telenova	**JahWise**; Jah Tung; Nicky Bomba; Shottaz
Best Rock/Punk Work	Soul, Funk, RNB & Gospel Work
**Pinch Points**; Dr Sure's Unusual Practice; Jaala; King Gizzard and the Lizard Wizard; Rolling Blackouts Coastal Fever	**Mo'Ju**; Kutcha Edwards; Lance Ferguson; Nikodimos; Zretro
MAV Diasporas Award (previously Best Global/Intercultural)	Best Producer
**Charles Maimarosia**; Ajak Kwai; Black Jesus Experience; Hand to Earth; Vanessa Estrada	**Alice Ivy**; Gab Strum; Oscar Dawson; Stuart Mackenzie; Tim Shiel
