= Dr. Colossus =

Australian metal band

- Dr. Colossus live in Melbourne, March 2026

Background information
- Origin: Melbourne, Australia
- Genres: Doom metal; stoner rock
- Years active: 2014–present
- Label: Death Mountain Records
- Members: Jono Colliver; Mike Findlay; Josh Eales; Joel Colliver
- Past members: Nathan Johnston

Dr. Colossus is an Australian doom metal band from Melbourne. The band mix doom metal with lyrical references to episodes of The Simpsons. In September 2017, the band released their first album, The Dank; in May 2021, the band released their second studio album, I'm a Stupid Moron With an Ugly Face and a Big Butt and My Butt Smells and I Like to Kiss My Own Butt which debuted at number 16 on the ARIA Charts.

== History ==
=== 2014–2016: Early years and formation ===
Jono Colliver and Nathan Johnston met playing in a high school rock band called Emprica and continued playing in bands such as Honeytrap and Kashmere Club for twelve years, prior to forming Dr. Colossus. It was on tour in Tasmania with Honeytrap in 2011 that the seeds of what would become Dr. Colossus were planted. Colliver recalls, "We were going to start a doom band and we were like, 'What's the heaviest name for this band? What's just a massive, dumb, heavy, big thing?" and after deliberating names such as monolith, colossal or colossus, Colliver said "'Why don't we name the band after Dr. Colossus from The Simpsons?'" which led to Johnston saying "Well why don't we just make all the songs about The Simpsons?'" Colliver told the ABC that for the next couple of years, the idea of a "Simpsons-themed doom-metal band" refused to dislodge itself from their minds.

In early 2014, Johnston had dedicated his time to Kashmere Club, while Colliver has toured the world as Vance Joy's bassist and during down time, the duo recorded a three-track extended play, titled IV, and distributed it to various music blogs and labels. Germany label Totem Manufacture Records released a limited edition on cassette.

In 2015, another Simpsons-themed metal band, Okilly Dokilly, launched and went viral, with the band recalling "We were like 'Awww, that sucks'. We thought … that was our only chance and they've nabbed it from us."

The band released further singles were released in 2015 which were compiled on the 2016 album, Death Mountain Collection.

=== 2017–present: Studio albums ===
Dr. Colossus performing live in March, 2026.

In 2017, Colliver and Johnston added a third member, bass player Mike Findlay, and started a crowdfunding campaign that easily eclipsed its target. They recorded their debut album, The Dank which was released in September 2017.

In November 2017, Nathan Johnston died in his sleep. After some grieving time, Colliver and Findlay struggled with the sense there was "some unfinished business with Dr. Colossus that Nath would have wanted to be finished" and they called in one of Nathan's longtime friends Josh Eales to take his place on drums, as well as Jono's brother Joel as an extra guitarist, with the idea of playing some tribute shows to honour Nathan's memory.

In July 2019, the band released the single, "Sixty-Six & Six", their first new music in two years and an Australian tour with Okilly Dokilly. "Sixty-Six & Six" tells the tale of Rod and Todd Flanders and their firm stance on not going to church.

In February 2020, the band toured with Okilly Dokilly in Australia.

In March 2021, the band announced the forthcoming released of their second studio album, alongside the single "Pickabar", which references the story of when Homer forgets to pick Bart up from soccer practice. The album was released on 22 May 2021 and debuted at number 16 on the ARIA Charts.

== Personnel ==
=== Current members ===
- Jono Colliver – lead vocals, guitar (2014–present)
- Mike Findlay – bass (2017–present)
- Josh Eales – drums (2018–present)
- Joel Colliver – guitar (2018–present)

=== Former members ===
- Nathan Johnston – drums (2014–2017; his death)

== Discography ==
=== Studio albums ===
List of studio albums, with Australian chart positions
Title	Album details	Peak chart positions
Title	Album details	AUS
The Dank	Released: September 2017; Label: Death Mountain Records (BORT002); Formats: CD, LP, digital download, streaming	—
I'm a Stupid Moron With an Ugly Face and a Big Butt and My Butt Smells and I Like to Kiss My Own Butt	Released: 22 May 2021; Label: Dr. Colossus; Formats: LP, digital download, streaming, cassette	16

=== Compilation albums ===
List of compilation albums, with release date and label shown
Title	Details
Death Mountain Collection	Released: September 2016; Label: Death Mountain Productions; Formats: digital download, streaming

=== Extended plays ===
List of EPs, with release date and label shown
Title	Details
IV	Released: 24 July 2014; Label: Dr. Colossus, Totem Manufacture Records (TMR03); Formats: digital download, streaming, Cassette (Ltd)

=== Singles ===
List of singles, with year released and album name shown
Title	Year	Album
"Shut Up and Eat Your Pinecone!" / "Whack Sabbath"	2015	Death Mountain Collection
"Stupid Sexy Flanders"	2015	Death Mountain Collection
"Excellent"	2015	Death Mountain Collection
"Sixty-Six & Six"	2019	non-album single
"Pickabar"	2021	I'm a Stupid Moron With an Ugly Face and a Big Butt and My Butt Smells and I Like to Kiss My Own Butt
"Lard Lad"	2021	I'm a Stupid Moron With an Ugly Face and a Big Butt and My Butt Smells and I Like to Kiss My Own Butt
"This Christmas (Buy Me Bonestorm or Go To Hell!)"	2022	non-album single

== Awards and nominations ==
=== Music Victoria Awards ===
The Music Victoria Awards, are an annual awards night celebrating Victorian music. They commenced in 2005.

Year	Nominee / work	Award	Result	Ref.
2021	Best Heavy Act	Dr. Colossus	Won	
