= Charm of Finches =

Australian music duo

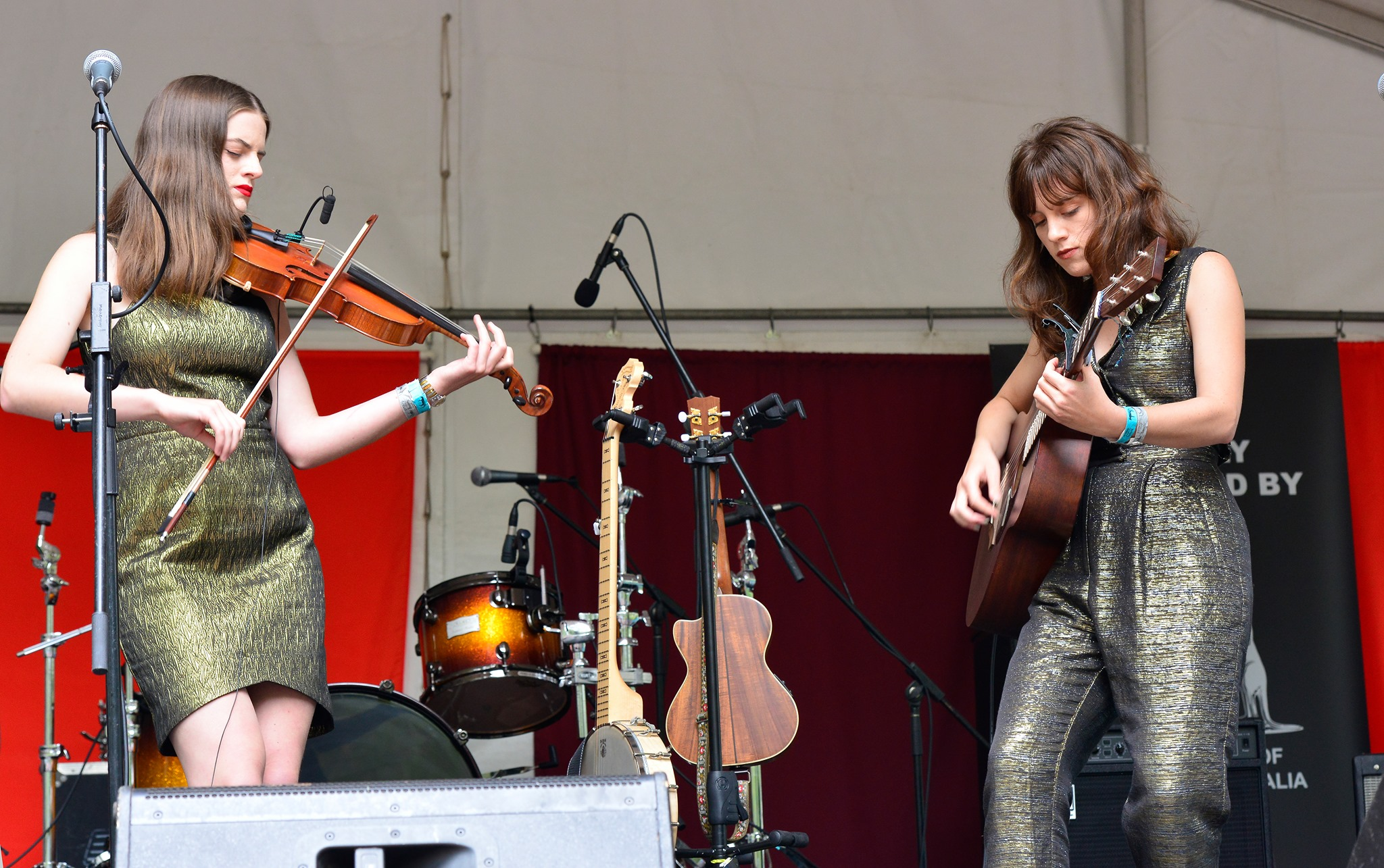
- Charm of Finches live at Nannup Music Festival WA

Background information
- Origin: Melbourne, Victoria Australia
- Genres: Folk music
- Years active: 2014–present
- Label: AntiFragile Music (2021+)
- Members: Mabel Windred-Wornes; Ivy Windred-Wornes
- Website: charmoffinchesband.com

Charm of Finches are an Australian duo consisting of Mabel and Ivy Windred-Wornes, who are sisters. The duo say "We write contemporary folk songs inspired by our personal experiences of love, grief and nature. We like to describe our music as contemporary chamber folk."

== Background ==
Mabel and Ivy Windred-Wornes grew up in the Melbourne suburb of Northcote. As kids they listened to a lot of folk music around the house such as Americana and Appalachian mountain music as well as English and Celtic folk tunes. At the ages of eight and eleven, they busked outside of the local vegetable shop and played songs by First Aid Kit.

They went to Steiner School and took up learning stringed instruments (violin and cello), when they were eight years old. Mabel later taught herself how to play the guitar and they started writing songs together.

== Musical career ==
In 2014, at ages eleven and fourteen, the duo made their debut EP as part of a school project. Their friend Michael Johnson heard the songs and offered to record them in his home studio with Evripedes Evripidou and it became Home. In 2015, they won the Darebin Music Feast Songwriters’ Award.

In July 2016, the duo released their debut album, which was praised by Paul Gough of Radio National's Inside Sleeve program as "stunning new folk".

In 2019, they released their second studio album, Your Company.

At the start of 2020 they showcased at the Folk Alliance International Conference in New Orleans, US. They were one of 96 artists selected worldwide to participate in the first Global Music Match. Their album Your Company won Folk/Singer-Songwriter at the Independent Music Awards of 2020.

In January 2021, it was announced that they duo had signed to the New York label AntiFragile. AntiFragile's Tom Sarig said "I'm overjoyed to have signed Charm of Finches to AntiFragile Music, and we are so looking forward to releasing their next album in 2021."

In August 2021, they released "Canyon", the lead single from their third studio album, Wonderful Oblivion, released on 22 October 2021.

Their fourth studio album, Marlinchen in the Snow was released in April 2024.

== Discography ==
=== Albums ===
List of studio albums, with Australian chart positions
Title	Album details	Peak chart positions
Title	Album details	AUS
Staring at the Starry Ceiling	Released: 29 July 2016; Label: Charm of Finches; Format: CD, digital	—
Your Company	Released: 29 November 2019; Label: Conversations With Trees (CWT002); Format: CD, digital	— (Note: Your Company did not enter the ARIA top 100 Album chart, but peaked at number 6 on the 100% Australian Independent Albums Chart.)
Wonderful Oblivion	Released: 22 October 2021; Label: AntiFragile Music (192641826177); Format: CD, digital	— (Note: Wonderful Oblivion did not enter the ARIA top 50 Album chart, but peaked at number 18 on the ARIA Australian Artist Album Chart)
Marlinchen in the Snow	Released: 19 April 2024; Label: Spunk Records; Format: CD, digital	TBA

=== Extended plays ===
List of EPs, with Australian chart positions
Title	EP details	Peak chart positions
Title	EP details	AUS
Home	Released: August 2014; Label: Charm of Finches; Format: CD, DD	—

== Awards and nominations ==
=== Australian Music Prize ===
The Australian Music Prize (the AMP) is an annual award of $30,000 given to an Australian band or solo artist in recognition of the merit of an album released during the year of award. The commenced in 2005.

Year	Nominee / work	Award	Result	Ref.
2020	Your Company	Australian Music Prize	Longlisted	

=== Independent Music Awards ===
The Independent Music Awards is a global community of indie artists, industry influencers and engaged fan. The awards commenced in 2002.

Year	Nominee / work	Award	Result	Ref.
2020	Your Company	Folk/Singer-Songwriter (album)	Won	
2020	"Fish in the Sea"	Folk/Singer-Songwriter (song)	Nominated	

=== Music Victoria Awards ===
The Music Victoria Awards, are an annual awards night celebrating Victorian music. The commenced in 2005.

Year	Nominee / work	Award	Result	Ref.
2020	Your Company	Best Folk or Roots Album	Nominated	
2021	Charm of Finches	Best Folk Act	Won	
2022	Charm of Finches	Best Folk Work	Nominated	

=== National Live Music Awards ===
The National Live Music Awards (NLMAs) commenced in 2016 to recognise contributions to the live music industry in Australia.

Year	Nominee / work	Award	Result	Ref.
2023	Charm of Finches	Best Folk Act	Nominated	
