= Ashwarya =

Indian-Australian singer and songwriter

- Born: India
- Origin: Melbourne, Australia
- Genres: R&B; pop
- Instrument: Vocals

Ashwarya (stylised in all caps) is an Indian-born Australian singer and songwriter.

== Career ==
Ashwarya's singles "Psycho Hole" and "Biryani" were released in 2020, which were followed by her debut extended play, Nocturnal Hours, on 8 July 2021. She released the song "Can't Relate" on 17 August 2022.

== Artistry ==
=== Musical style and influences ===
Shah lists musicians such as Rihanna, Kanye West, Travis Scott, Sufjan Stevens, Tyler, the Creator, and SZA as influences.

== Discography ==
=== Extended plays ===
List of EPs, with release date and label shown
Title	EP retails
Nocturnal Hours	Released: 8 July 2021; Label: Noize Recordings; Formats: Digital download, streaming
Why It's Gotta Hurt	Released: 29 September 2023; Label: Ashwarya; Formats: Digital download, streaming

=== Singles ===
List of singles, with year released and album shown
Title	Year	Album
"Psycho Hole"	2020	Nocturnal Hours
"Biryani"	2020	Nocturnal Hours
"To the Night" (featuring Vic Mensa)	2021	Nocturnal Hours
"Flare"	2021	non album singles
"Can't Relate"	2022	non album singles
"Best Friend"	2022	Why It's Gotta Hurt
"Up in My Head"	2023	Why It's Gotta Hurt
"Why It's Gotta Hurt"	2023	Why It's Gotta Hurt
"Honest" (with Davey)	2024	
"NRG"	2025	

== Awards and nominations ==
=== Music Victoria Awards ===
The Music Victoria Awards, are an annual awards night celebrating Victorian music. They commenced in 2005.

Year	Nominee / work	Award	Result	Ref.
2021	Ashwarya	Best Breakthrough Act	Nominated	

=== Vanda & Young Global Songwriting Competition ===
The Vanda & Young Global Songwriting Competition is an annual competition that "acknowledges great songwriting whilst supporting and raising money for Nordoff-Robbins" and is coordinated by Albert Music and APRA AMCOS. It commenced in 2009.

Year	Nominee / work	Award	Result	Ref.
2025	"Junoon"	Vanda & Young Global Songwriting Competition	Finalist	
