= Choose Your Weapon =

Studio album by Hiatus Kaiyote
- Released: 1 May 2015
- Recorded: 2013–2015
- Genres: Neo soul; alternative R&B
- Length: 69:14
- Labels: Flying Buddha; Sony Masterworks
- Producers: Salaam Remi (exec.); Hiatus Kaiyote

Hiatus Kaiyote chronology
Tawk Tomahawk (2012)	Choose Your Weapon (2015)	Mood Valiant (2021)

Choose Your Weapon is the second studio album by Australian neo-soul quartet Hiatus Kaiyote, first released in 1 May 2015 through Flying Buddha and Sony Masterworks. Following the release of the band's debut album Tawk Tomahawk (2012) and their first Grammy nomination, Hiatus Kaiyote went on to tour throughout 2014. Over the span of two years, recording sessions took place in Australia and the United States.

Choose Your Weapon is a neo soul album that takes influence from a variety of genres including jazz, soul, R&B, progressive rock, West African funk, and samba and Latin grooves. Thematically, the album's songs touch upon topics such as the supernatural, technology and death. All members of the band contributed lyrics and production, while Salaam Remi, the founder of Flying Buddha, served as the album's executive producer.

Upon release, the album was met with positive reception from music critics, who praised the album's production and musical structure, and was named as one of the year’s best albums. The album saw some commercial success and debuted at #22 on the Australian albums chart. The song "Breathing Underwater" was nominated for Best R&B Performance at the 58th Grammy Awards.

== Background ==
The band began receiving attention in 2013, when they were nominated for a Grammy for Best R&B Performance for their song "Nakamarra", performed with Q-Tip, but lost out to Snarky Puppy and Lalah Hathaway's recording "Something". In 2014, the band joined forces with hip hop artist Remi, the multi-faceted Kirkis, producer Silent Jay and vocalist Jace XL to embark on an Australia-wide tour titled 'The Sonic Architects National Conference'. Three additional backing vocalists: Jace, Loreli, and Jay Jay were added for this tour. During the tour Hiatus Kayiote met Taylor McFerrin, whom they credit for bringing them international attention after catching the last part of Hiatus' set in January 2014. Not long after, Hiatus Kayiote was playing on air in Los Angeles and soon came to the attention of Animal Collective, The Dirty Projectors, and Erykah Badu.

== Recording ==
Recording sessions for the album took place in Australia and the United States at various studios including Ghost Oak Studios in Mornington Peninsula, Australia, Headshell Hideout, Oakland Studios, Sound Park Studios, Willow Grove Studios all in Melbourne, Australia and Instrument Zoo in Miami. Nai Palm served as the album's writer, vocalist, guitar and keyboard provider, Paul Bender provided guitar, keyboards and programming, Simon Mavin also provided keyboards, vocoder and percussion alongside Perrin Moss who provided keyboards, drums and percussion. Lead vocalist Nai Palm described the album as an "extension" of their debut, and stated she and the band had no intention to make a one genre body of work. During the recording the band wanted to pay tribute to the format of a mixtape, so they incorporated a range of interludes.

When recording the album the band wanted to create a body of work that was not "temporary" stating that; "everyone is just looking to release the next hot single, this record is in tribute to listening to an album from start to finish where there is a narrative that takes you to all these different soundscapes." The band recorded the songs individually and then put them in order with the interludes. All the album's tracks were written by Nai Palm. The interludes were written and produced when the band would gather and just be "vibing as musicians." Some of the songs on the album– like “Fingerprints”– were written when she was 16 and “Jekyll” was one of the first songs she ever wrote. “Breathing Underwater” is a song that Palm wrote when she and the band were on tour.

== Music and lyrics ==
Choose Your Weapon is a neo soul album consisting of eighteen tracks, lasting seventy minutes. The album's production is characterised as being filled with "brain-liquifying synth-grooves, arousingly-unsettling time signature shifts," and "agile polyrhythms." The album's music was described as not being one genre but instead taking a variety of influences from a wide range of musical genres, including jazz, soul, R&B, West African funk, samba and Latin. Ryan B. Patrick of Exclaim! described the album's sound as containing "elements of late '90s, early '00s neo-soul: kick snares, electronic organ and bass guitar."

Andy Kellman of Allmusic described the album as being more refined than that of the band's debut, Kellman described the album as being built on "vocal melodies and guitar wriggles sneak up and tickle the ears, burbling electronics mingle with spiny acoustic guitars, time signatures abruptly switch and stun." The album's lyrical content touches upon various themes including natural and supernatural topics as well as speaking about technological subjects. Other songs on the album speak of a more personal subject matter, "By Fire," is a burial song inspired in part by Palm's father's house-fire death.

== Critical reception ==
Professional ratings
Aggregate scores
Source	Rating
Metacritic	87/100
Review scores
Source	Rating
AllMusic	5/5 stars
The A.V. Club	B+
Clash	8/10 stars
Exclaim!	8/10
The Guardian	4/5 stars
HipHopDX	9/10

Upon release, Choose Your Weapon was generally met with critical praise. Review aggregator Metacritic has given the album a normalized rating of 87 out of 100, based on 7 reviews, indicating 'universal acclaim'.

In AllMusic, Andy Kellman praised the album's genre mixture, that covered a variety of era's; "'50s bop to '60s MPB, or '70s art rock to '80s boogie, or '90s neo-soul to 2000s dubstep." and when comparing it to their previous album that "The band refines and broadens its attack. From track to track, one ingenious idea trails another. Vocal melodies and guitar wriggles sneak up and tickle the ears, burbling electronics mingle with spiny acoustic guitars, time signatures abruptly switch and stun." Reviewing the album for HipHopDX, Ural Garrett applauded the album's ability to create "fresh" soul from different "angles", and repeatedly called Choose Your Weapon one of the year’s best albums. Clash's Errol Anderson praised the band for creating an album that is "both vibrant and uninhibited in its nature" ."

The A.V. Club's Joshua Ashton commended the album's complexity and structure, stating the album's music bolts "in unexpected directions just as they seem to settle into a groove." In the review for Mojo, it was claimed that "At 70 minutes long, there's a lot to digest but it's worth persevering with as repeated listens gradually unveil a musical universe unlike any other." In Exclaim!, Ryan B. Patrick simply called the album "a solid groove."

When reviewing the record for The Guardian, Everett True stated that "This [release] is a love letter to the whole of nature, a self-indulgent trip to the other side of consciousness, an experience you have to fully immerse yourself in to appreciate. And the meanings behind the songs are as varied and spatial as the music itself."

== Track listing ==
All lyrics are written by Nai Palm; all music is composed by Nai Palm, Paul Bender, Perrin Moss, Simon Mavin.

Choose Your Weapon track listing
No.	Title	Length
1.	"Choose Your Weapon"	1:34
2.	"Shaolin Monk Motherfunk"	5:51
3.	"Laputa"	2:26
4.	"Creations Part One"	0:49
5.	"Borderline with My Atoms"	6:02
6.	"Breathing Underwater"	5:44
7.	"Cicada"	0:38
8.	"Swamp Thing"	5:00
9.	"Fingerprints"	4:17
10.	"Jekyll"	5:33
11.	"Prince Minikid"	2:50
12.	"Atari"	6:09
13.	"By Fire"	5:04
14.	"Creations Part Two"	1:01
15.	"The Lung"	4:54
16.	"Only Time All the Time: Making Friends with Studio Owl"	1:03
17.	"Molasses"	4:49
18.	"Building a Ladder"	5:42
Total length:		69:14

2022 Deluxe Reissue bonus tracks
No.	Title	Length
19.	"Breathing Underwater (Roman Soto Cello Rework)"	5:27
20.	"Making Friends With Studio Owl (Club Mix)"	5:56
Total length:		80:37

== Personnel ==
Credits adapted from AllMusic.

Musicians

- Hiatus Kaiyote – arranger, engineer, producers
- Paul Bender – bass, guitar, keyboards, programming
- Simon Mavin – keyboards, percussion, vocoder
- Perrin Moss – bass, drums, keyboards, percussion
- Nai Palm – artwork, guitar, keyboards, vocals

Other technical personnel

- Phil Noy-Engineer-Producer-Drum production
- Miguel Atwood-Ferguson – string arrangements, strings
- Phil Binotto – percussion
- Andrei Eremin – mastering
- Adam King – percussion
- Salvador Persico – percussion
- Salaam Remi – executive producer

Direction

- Laura Christoforidis – cover design, formatting
- Laura Kszan – product development
- Laneous "Lame-boy" the Lunchboxer – cover art
- Jennifer Liebeskind – product development
- Federico Ruiz – graphic design
- Roxanne Slimak – art direction
- Wilk – photography

== Charts ==
Chart performance for Choose Your Weapon
Chart (2015)	Peak position
Australian Albums (ARIA)	22
US Billboard 200	127
US Heatseekers Albums (Billboard)	1
US Top R&B/Hip-Hop Albums (Billboard)	11
