= Cable Ties (band) =

Australian punk rock band

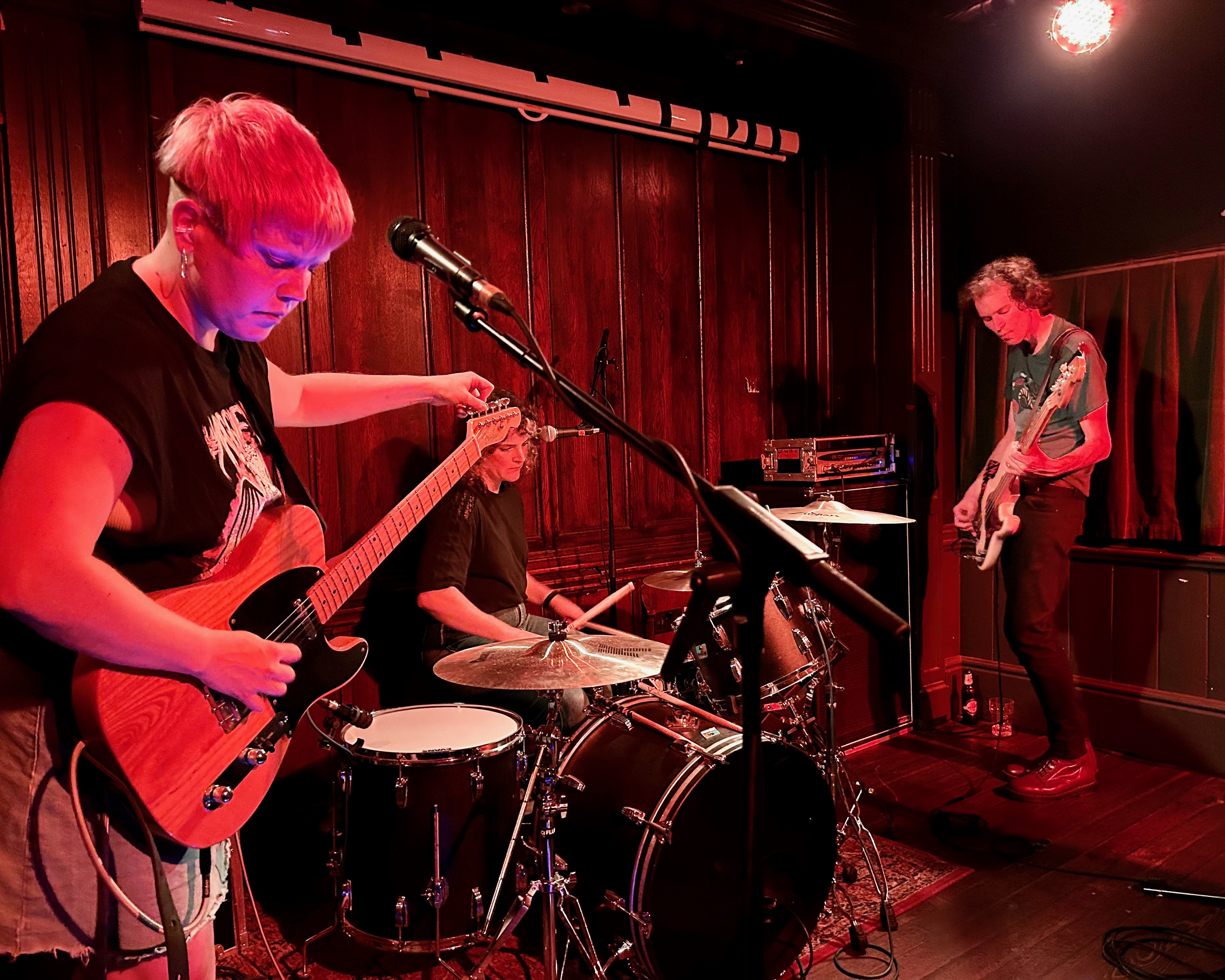
- Cable Ties performing at the Castle Hotel in Manchester, England, 2023

Background information
- Origin: Melbourne, Australia
- Genres: Punk rock; garage rock; post-punk
- Years active: 2015–present
- Labels: Poison City; Merge
- Spinoff of: Wet Lips
- Members: Jenny McKechnie; Nick Brown; Shauna Boyle
- Website: cabletiesband.com

Cable Ties are an Australian punk rock band formed in Melbourne in 2015.

Guitarist and lead vocalist Jenny McKechnie moved to Melbourne from Bendigo with a background in folk music, and was introduced to the city's burgeoning punk music scene by a friend, Grace Kindellan, who formed a band (Wet Lips) with McKechnie on bass guitar. McKechnie joined bassist Nick Brown and drummer Shauna Boyle to form Cable Ties in 2015, with the band naming itself after cable ties in reference to the band's "very physical but functional" sound. They played their earliest gigs at The Tote Hotel in Collingwood and The Old Bar in Fitzroy, and their debut studio album, the eponymous Cable Ties was released in May 2017.

The band is signed to Melbourne independent record label Poison City Records. Their second studio album, Far Enough, was released internationally on American label Merge Records in March 2020.

In March 2022, Cable Ties announced the release of their third studio album, All Her Plans, released on 23 June 2023. In an album review, Alex Gallagher from NME said "Cable Ties just keep getting better. All Her Plans finds the post-punk trio's musical chemistry at both its tightest and most adventurous."

== Discography ==
=== Albums ===
List of albums, with selected details
Title	Details
Cable Ties	Released: May 2017; Format: LP, CD, digital; Label: Poison City (PCR139)
Far Enough	Released: January 2020; Format: LP, CD, digital; Label: Poison City (PCR167)
Live at the Scrap Museum	Released: January 2022; Format: Cassette, CD, digital; Label: Poison City (PCR178); Note: Live album
All Her Plans	Released: June 2023; Format: LP, CD, digital; Label: Poison City

== Awards and nominations ==
=== Music Victoria Awards ===
The Music Victoria Awards, are an annual awards night celebrating Victorian music. They commenced in 2005.

Year	Nominee / work	Award	Result	Ref.
2017	Cable Ties	Best Album	Nominated	
2017	"Say What You Mean"	Best Song	Nominated	
2017	Cable Ties	Best Band	Nominated	
2017	Cable Ties	Best Emerging Artist	Nominated	
2017	Cable Ties	Best Live Act	Nominated	
2018	Cable Ties	Best Live Act	Nominated	
2020	Far Enough	Best Victorian Album	Nominated	
2020	Far Enough	Best Rock/Punk Album	Won	
2020	Cable Ties	Best Band	Nominated	
2020	Cable Ties	Best Live Act	Nominated	
2023	All Her Plans	Best Album	Nominated	
2023	Cable Ties	Best Group	Won	
2023	Cable Ties	Best Rock/Punk Work	Won	

=== National Live Music Awards ===
The National Live Music Awards (NLMAs) commenced in 2016 to recognise contributions to the live music industry in Australia.

Year	Nominee / work	Award	Result	Ref.
2023	Cable Ties	Best Punk/Hardcore Act	Nominated	
