= Isol-Aid =

Australian virtual music festival during 2020

- Location: Australia
- Years active: 2020–2021
- Website: www.isolaidfestival.com

Isol-Aid (pitched as an Instagram Live Music Festival) is a stay-at-home festival initiative aiming to assist the Australian music industry during the COVID-19 pandemic.

The first concert featured 72 artists and took place from 12 noon to 12 midnight on 21–22 March 2020. Artists' live-streamed their 20-minute performance via their Instagram accounts from wherever they were practising self-distancing.

A second festival occurred on 28–29 March 2020, featuring 74 artists and a third on 4–5 April 2020.

In July 2021, Isol-Aid launched Homegrown, a new program providing creative and financial support to emerging bands across Australia and New Zealand. Homegrown was pitched as a 16-week program whereby "emerging local acts are invited to perform 30-minute sets alongside established artists as part of Isol-Aid's online festival." The first event took place on 14 July 2021.

On 1 September 2021, Isol-Aid announced Australian Musicians for Afghanistan, as eight-hour livestream concert to help raise funds for Afghanistan, with all money raised from the event being donated to the Australian-based aid organisation Mahboba's Promise. The event took place on 2 September 2021.

At the 2021 Music Victoria Awards, Isol-Aid won Best Festival.

== Background ==
Isol-Aid is an online music festival and community, profiling musicians – who would otherwise have had shows, launches, tours and other appearances planned – to create content and stream live and online to an audience. The festival was created in the days after the coronavirus pandemic reached Australia, when it became immediately clear that musicians and their teams would be heavily impacted by the cancellation of their shows and tours.

The online festival was free to watch, but viewers were asked to support the artists if they could saying "whatever you donate will go directly to the Isol-Aid artists and their teams." An Isol-Aid statement added "If they are in the financial position to do so, viewers are encouraged to buy music and merch from the artists' Bandcamp and Patreon pages, [and] their websites."

== Awards and nominations ==
=== Music Victoria Awards ===
The Music Victoria Awards, are an annual awards night celebrating Victorian music. Best Festival commenced in 2016.

Year	Nominee / work	Award	Result	Ref.
2020	Isol-Aid	Best Festival	Nominated	
2021	Isol-Aid	Best Festival	Won	
