= Edge Radio =

Coordinates: 42°54′13.9″S 147°19′36.3″E

Edge Radio 99.3FM (7EDG)
- Hobart, Tasmania; Australia
- Broadcast area: Greater Hobart
- Frequency: 99.3 MHz

Programming
- Language: English
- Format: Community radio

Ownership
- Owner: Tasmanian Youth Broadcasters Inc.

Technical information
- Licensing authority: ACMA
- ERP: 100 watts

Links
- Public licence information: Profile
- Website: www.edgeradio.org.au

Edge Radio (call sign 7EDG) is a community radio station situated in the Australian city of Hobart. It is a youth-oriented station, with most of its presenters under the age of thirty. It began broadcasting in February 2013 and receiving a license from the Australian Broadcasting Authority in December 2002.

Edge Radio focuses on local music, running a Tasmanian music show weekly. The studio is located in the University of Tasmania's Hobart campus.

It has won numerous CBAA Community Radio Awards, including for Excellence in News and Current Affairs Programming (2019), and Best Station Fundraising Campaign – Small Station (2021).

In 2003 Edge Radio won Community Radio Station of the Year at the CBAA Community Radio Awards.
