= Aslove =

French musician

- Aslove during a photo shoot in Palm Springs.

Background information
- Born: Guillaume Banet; Lons-le-Saunier, France
- Origin: Lons-le-Saunier, France
- Genres: Pop, Electro house, Rock music, Kpop
- Occupations: Dj, songwriter, record producer, mix engineer
- Instruments: Keyboards, drums, guitar, bass, harmonica
- Years active: 2011–present
- Labels: Capitol Music France, Universal Music Group, Warner Chappell Music, Milk & Honey, Helix Records
- Website: www.aslovemusic.com

Aslove or Gigi (born Guillaume Banet) is a French songwriter, record producer, mix engineer and musician, and also part of the French-Scottish band YES AND MAYBE. He rose to prominence in 2017 with his cover of Corinne Bailey Rae’s "Put Your Records On".

== Biography ==
=== Early life and beginnings ===
Originally from Lons-le-Saunier in the Jura department, Aslove began music at the age of five by learning drums. His stage name derives from Jimi Hendrix’s album Axis: Bold as Love, which belonged to his father. He quickly picked up other instruments including guitar, piano, bass and harmonica. In 2008 he discovered Justice, whose sound reminded him of the heavy rock heroes of his childhood, prompting him to buy a second-hand MacBook and start creating electronic music. In middle school he formed a duo with a guitarist friend to emulate Justice using GarageBand, Apple’s free music software.

Aslove discovered DJing at 15 in a nightclub in his home region. After four years as a resident DJ he decided to make it his profession. In April 2014 he joined the UCPA École des DJs in Lyon. In January 2015 he uploaded his first cover to SoundCloud. "Cupid’s Chokehold", a deep-house version of Gym Class Heroes’ song, was quickly picked up by international blogs. He worked with several singers, including Charles-Henry from the TV show Nouvelle Star. With him he covered "Miss You" by The Rolling Stones, but his version of "Feel Good Inc." by Gorillaz brought the most exposure. Supported by influential blogs, he grew his online profile while shaping a pop-and-house sound. He also worked with Philippe Krier, another Nouvelle Star alumnus, and sought feedback from Jean Rigo, guitarist of Les Infidèles.

Interested in the Tropical house wave on radio, Aslove prepared material for Amsterdam Dance Event in October 2016. By chance he came across Mia Wray's cover of Corinne Bailey Rae’s "Put Your Records On", whose understated performance convinced him to produce a new version.

=== Breakthrough ===
"Put Your Records On" entered the Top 100 most-played songs on French radio, with heavy rotation on outlets such as Virgin Radio. In August he released a remix of Katy Perry’s "Bon Appétit".

In November 2017 he released "So High" featuring Norma Jean Martine. A remix pack followed, supported by DJs including David Guetta and Don Diablo.

Influenced by the success of Bruno Mars, he released "Good Ideas" in 2018, a pop-funk track featuring Danish singer Tim Schou and German rapper Leroy Menace.

After numerous remixes, in 2019 Aslove began releasing one song per month toward his first album. The first single, "Dancing" featuring Dalvin, again presented Aslove as a singer in its video.

=== New Beginnings ===
Alongside his solo career, Aslove continues to work as a songwriter, producer and multi-instrumentalist, collaborating with French and international artists across a range of genres, including electronic music, pop, indie rock and K-pop. He has worked extensively with French DJ and producer Michael Calfan, co-writing and co-producing several tracks, including Wild Night, Body and Eighteen. He also produced Airplanes by Dutch singer Tomas Ferdinand and Toi tu pars by French singer Cephaz.

In 2025, Aslove entered the South Korean music industry, contributing to the songwriting and production of Reno, a collaboration between Miyeon, a member of the K-pop group i-dle, and South Korean singer Colde. Released on 28 October 2025, the track appears on Miyeon's second solo EP, MY, Lover. The collaboration marked a new chapter in his career as an international music producer.

In 2026, he also collaborated with French DJ and producer HUGEL, co-writing and co-producing Champagne, alongside Adamé and vocalist Amadi Blue. The track appears on Twenty One, HUGEL's debut studio album, released in June 2026.

In addition to his work in electronic and pop music, Aslove expanded into the UK indie rock scene. Together with Scottish singer and musician Calum Wilkinson, he formed the Franco-Scottish indie rock duo YES AND MAYBE, based in Glasgow. Within the band, he serves as guitarist, songwriter and producer. Following the release of several singles, including Bloody Madness, God Isn't Real and Rebound, the duo released their debut album, Train To Nowhere, on 31 July 2026. Featuring fifteen tracks, the album represents a new artistic direction in Aslove's career, exploring a more guitar-driven, alternative rock sound.

== Discography ==
=== EPs ===
- 2016: Covers
- 2018: So High (feat. Norma Jean Martine) – Remixes
1. "So High" – Extended
2. "So High" (Hugel Remix)
3. "So High" (LeMarquis Remix)
4. "So High" (RetroVision Remix)
- 2023: Hippie House, Vol. 1

=== Singles ===
- 2015: "Cupid's Chokehold"
- 2015: "Miss You"
- 2015: "Creep"
- 2015: "Feel Good Inc"
- 2017: "Put Your Records On" (feat. Mia Wray)
- 2017: "Put Your Records On" (Club Mix)
- 2017: "So High" (feat. Norma Jean Martine)
- 2018: "Good Ideas" (feat. Tim Schou and Leroy Menace)
- 2019: "Dancing" (feat. Dalvin)
- 2019: "The Show" (feat. Kho)
- 2019: "Out Of Time" (feat. French Tobacco)
- 2019: "Bedtime Story"
- 2019: "Under Your Spell" (feat. Wolfgang)
- 2020: "Boom Boom" (feat. Franky)
- 2021: "So So Young" (feat. Stealth)
- 2022: "Get Around"
- 2022: "Me & U"
- 2022: "Piece Of My Heart"
- 2023: "Stay High"

=== Remixes ===
- 2017: KIKKR – "Makin' Me High"
- 2017: Katy Perry – "Bon Appétit"
- 2017: LUDE – "It's All Right"
- 2017: Carla Bruni – "Miss You"
- 2018: Mattway – "Closure"
- 2018: LeMarquis – "Up All Night"
- 2018: Quentin Mosimann – "Forever"
- 2018: Jacob Banks – "Unknown (To You)"
- 2018: KEV – "Make Up Your Mind"
- 2018: Huko – "Can't Get Over You"
- 2018: BLV – "Badunkadunk"
- 2018: Sara Costa – "Watch Me Dance"
- 2018: M.I.L.K. – "Rebound"
- 2019: Lil Nas X – "Old Town Road"
- 2020: Son Little – "Hey Rose"
- 2020: Black Eyed Peas – "Mamacita"
- 2021: NEZZY – "Stay"

== Writing and producing credits ==
Year	Artist	Song	Credit
2020	Cynthia	"Solo"	Producer
2020	Cynthia	"Billets Violets"	Producer
2020	Ferdiant	"Airplanes"	Writer
2021	Noize Generation	"Who You Are"	Writer
2021	Michael Calfan	"Body"	Producer, writer
2021	Michael Calfan	"Imagining"	Producer, writer
2021	Michael Calfan	"Wild Night"	Producer, writer
2021	Michael Calfan	"Silhouette"	Producer, writer
2021	Faouzia	"Hero" (Michael Calfan Remix)	Producer
2021	Cheat Codes	"Lean On Me" (Michael Calfan Remix)	Producer
2021	Jason Derulo	"Acapulco" (Michael Calfan Remix)	Producer
2021	Cephaz	"Toi Tu Pars"	Writer
2021	Elle Hollis	"Ordinary Love"	Producer, writer
2021	Stealth	"So So Young"	Producer, writer
2021	BCX	"Photograph"	Mixer
2022	Michael Calfan	"3,2,1"	Producer, writer
2022	Michael Calfan	"Eighteen"	Producer, writer
2022	Michael Calfan	"Slides"	Producer, writer
2022	Michael Calfan	"Fall To Pieces"	Producer, writer
2022	Michael Calfan	"Deals with God"	Producer, writer
2022	Michael Calfan	"DM ME"	Producer, writer
2022	Sia	"Courage to Change" (Michael Calfan Remix)	Producer
2022	St. Lundi	"Nights Like This" (Michael Calfan Remix)	Producer
2022	John Dahlbäck	"Pyramid" (Michael Calfan Remix)	Producer
2022	Calum Venice	"Break My Soul"	Producer, writer
2022	Calum Venice	"Bones"	Producer, writer
2022	Ozin	"Les Montagnes"	Producer
2022	Cynthia Leone	"Cœur Grenadine"	Mixer
2022	Cynthia Leone	"J'me Fais Des Films"	Mixer
2022	Cynthia Leone	"Le Monde Ou Rien"	Mixer
2022	Cynthia Leone	"Mademoiselle"	Mixer
2022	Cynthia Leone	"Movie Star"	Mixer
	Cynthia Leone	"Sois Belle Et Tais Toi"	Mixer
	Cynthia Leone	"Stéreo"	Mixer
2023	Ozin	"L'Ecorce"	Producer
2023	Michael Calfan	"Going Round Again"	Producer, writer
2023	Rob Adans	"Only For The Night"	Producer
2023	Raiden, Rob Adans	"There For You"	Producer
2023	Louise Combier	"Ivres de Joie"	Producer
2023	Louise Combier	"Printemps"	Producer
2023	Rob Adans	"Get What You Want"	Producer
2023	Rob Adans, Raiden	"There For You"	Producer
2023	Rob Adans	"Only For The Night"	Producer
2023	Louise Combier	"Tu n'auras plus"	Producer
2024	Louise Combier	"Nuits Cinématiques"	Producer
2024	Ozin	"Les Filles De Mon Pays"	Producer
2024	Ozin	"Pepas"	Producer
2024	Steering Will	"You Got Me"	Producer
2024	Delta Heavy	"Anywhere"	Writer
2025	Bedoin, Dorian Craft, Baron	"Better Than This"	Producer
2025	YES AND MAYBE	"Bloody Madness"	Producer, writer
2025	Martin Solveig, Creange, Aslove	"Everybody"	Producer
2025	YES AND MAYBE	"God Isn't Real"	Producer, writer
2025	AZZUR, Meloko, Baron	"Me Gusta (Birds Of Mind Remix)"	Producer
2025	The Spirit Project, Starving Yet Full, Moojo	"Find Your Way"	Producer
2025	Agoria, Birds Of Mine	"Quiero"	Producer
2025	YES AND MAYBE	"Rebound"	Producer, writer
2025	Miyeon	"Reno (feat. Colde)"	Producer, writer
2026	HUGEL	"Champagne"	Producer, writer
2026	YES AND MAYBE	"Train To Nowhere" (Album)	Producer, writer
