= Future soul =

Music genre

- Stylistic origins: Neo soul; pop; electronic; dubstep; hip hop
- Cultural origins: 2010s, United Kingdom

Future soul is a term often used by UK singer-songwriter Daley in the 2010s to describe a style of music that emerged from soul and contemporary R&B. Although both soulful and conscious, future soul is distinguished from neo soul as it infuses more elements of pop, electronica, dubstep and hip hop instead of jazz and funk. Simply put, future soul is soulful songwriting infused with forward thinking electronic production.

Future soul has emerged into the mainstream with commercial and critical success from several future soul artists such as Alex Clare and his hit song "Too Close", Daley, Kymistry, Omari Oneal and Janelle Monáe.

French DJ David Guetta has done future soul in his song "Night of Your Life", which features American singer Jennifer Hudson. Melbourne-based band Hiatus Kaiyote have described their music as future soul.

The genre since its inception has taken on a much more defined sound with artists such as Josh Jacobson, who emerged around the same time as Daley. Jacobson went on to produce tracks such as "Not Alone" (featuring Skela) (2015) and his cover of Little Dragon's "Twice" (2016), which both created waves in the online music community for a unique yet defined sound. Surrounding these releases, press including electronic tastemakers Nest HQ were dubbing Jacobson's sound as "future soul".
