= Meredith Music Festival =

Annual outdoor music festival in Meredith, Victoria, Australia

Coordinates: 37°50′48″S 143°55′55″E

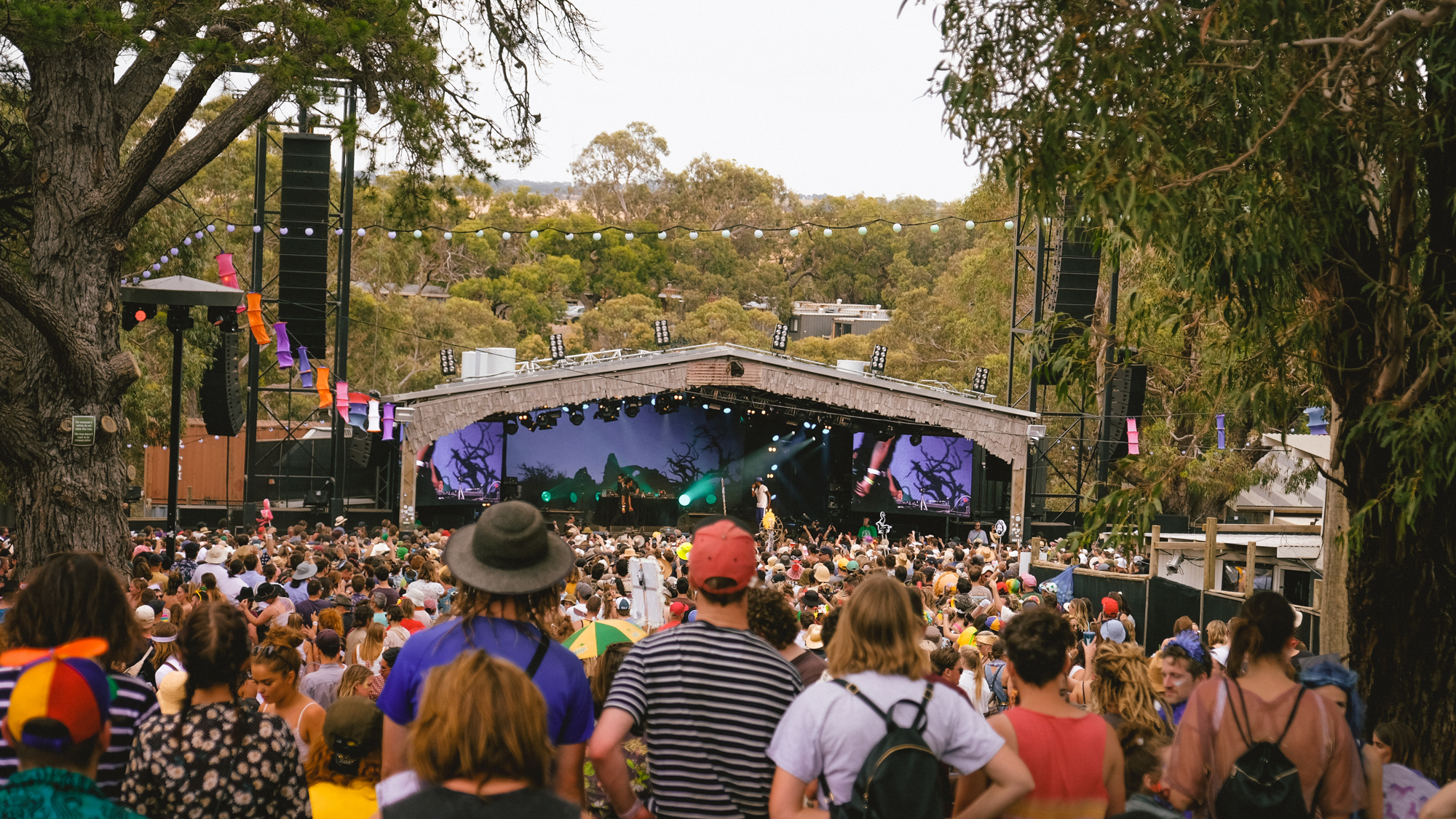
- The Stage in the Meredith Supernatural Amphitheatre
- Genre: Rock; pop; hip hop; punk; soul; disco; house; techno
- Dates: First or second weekend of December
- Locations: Victoria, Australia
- Years active: 1991–2019, 2022–present
- Website: mmf.com.au

Meredith Music Festival (MMF), also known simply as Meredith, is a three-day outdoor music festival held every December at the Meredith Supernatural Amphitheatre, a natural amphitheatre located on private farmland near the town of Meredith in Victoria, Australia.

== History ==
A self-funded, non-commercial event that was first held in 1991, the festival also spawned Golden Plains, a music festival that takes place over the Labour Day long weekend in March.

No festivals were held in 2020 or 2021 owing to the COVID-19 pandemic in Australia.

== Description ==
The Meredith Music Festival, often referred to as simply Meredith, is an annual three-day outdoor music festival held in December at the Meredith Supernatural Amphitheatre, which is located on private farmland near the town of Meredith, Victoria. The property is owned by the family of one of the organisers, Chris Nolan. Permanent infrastructure has been built on the site, including showers, compost toilets, and recycled water with the surrounding areas set up for usage of tents, vans, caravans, or motorhomes.

=== Attractions ===
- The Meredith Gift (a reference to the Stawell Gift) is a nude running race, with the chance to win The Golden Jocks trophy.
- The Pink Flamingo Bar, an ever-popular cocktail bar
- Eric's Terrace, cocktail bar with a large selection of food and drinks.
- A sportsfield which includes the Meredith Eye Ferris wheel.
- The Ecoplex Cinema displays both short and feature-length films, including outdated informational films, advertisements and television shows intended to humour the audience.

=== Ticketing ===
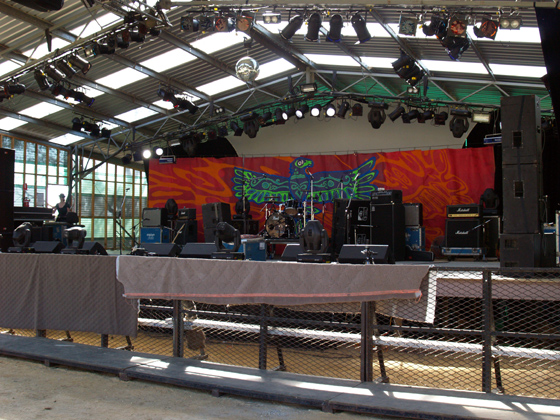
The stage set-up at the 2006 edition of the festival

The event is usually sold out before the date. As of 2007 ticketing was implemented via a system which sees the first allocation distributed through a 'Subscriber Ticket Ballot' – allowing half of the total allocation of tickets randomly distributed to 'subscribers' already on MMF's email list. Subscribers are notified in August and need to purchase their tickets within a set period of time.

The second allocation is sold in record stores in Melbourne, Geelong, Ballarat and the Surf Coast as has been the case in previous years. These go on sale after the Ballot closes. The third allocation is distributed online.

== Recognition and accolades ==
Warren Ellis (musician) (Dirty Three / Grinderman) referred to it as "the world's best festival" in a 2010 interview.

At the APRA Music Awards of 2020, the festival won Licensee of the Year Award.

== List of Meredith Music Festival lineups by year ==
This is a list of Meredith Music Festival lineups by year:

| Year | Artists |
|---|---|
| 1991 | The Dead Salesmen, The Boxing Tostados, Kill Sarah, Flamenco Sketches, The Celts, Picko, Ursula's Dream, Nick Cave and the Bad Seeds and more |
| 1992 | The Dead Salesmen, Guttersnipes, Warner Bros, Kill Sarah, Housewives' Choice, Ripe, Boxing Tostados, Powder Monkeys, Rod, Kipling Ensemble, Picko, Hoss, The Naked King's Servant, The Mavis's, The Nolte Grips, Rob Clarkson |
| 1993 | The Affected, Icecream Hands, The Plums, Ripe, The Fat Thing, Housewives' Choice, Powder Monkeys, Guttersnipes, Fireballs, Hoss, Billy Baxter, Loin Groin, Kipling Ensemble, Seaweed Goorillas, NKS Jamm, Spiderbait, The Whitlams |
| 1994 | Dirty Three, Magic Dirt, Spiderbait, Powder Monkeys, Fireballs, The Fauves, Melonman, Cranky, Freeloaders, Manic Suede, Warped, The Vinyl Creatures, Loin Groin, The Family, Spencer P. Jones and the Holyspirits, The Fat Thing, Rio Grande, Sherry Rich and the Grievous Angels |
| 1995 | Magic Dirt, Rebecca's Empire, Spiderbait, Chris Wilson and Shane O'Mara, The Mark of Cain, Ricaine, Joel Silbersher and Charlie Owen, Combo La Revelacion, Manic Suede, Automatic, Rio Grande, Ammonia, Warped, Sunset Strip, Paintstripper, Fur, Incursion, Powder Monkeys, Louis Tillett and Charlie Owen, Leaping Larry L. |
| 1996 | Tex, Don and Charlie, Snout, The Dumb Earth, The Mark of Cain, The Paradise Motel, Kim Salmon and the Surrealists, Chris Wilson and Shane O'Mara, Gaslight Radio, Magic Dirt, Ricaine, Crud, Combo La Revelacion, High Pass Filter, Drop City, Rebecca's Empire, Powder Monkeys, Bodyjar, Golden Lifestyle Band, Something for Kate, Screamfeeder, Hoss |
| 1997 | Jebediah, Custard, Not from There, Crow, X, Dirty Three, Matt Walker with Ashley Davies and Ross Hannaford, The Cruel Sea, Snog, Lisa Miller, Loin Groin, Mississippi Barry, Even, Augie March, Tomorrow People, Combo La Revelacion, Snout, The Dumb Earth, Bzark, Merrick & Rosso |
| 1998 | The Make-Up, The Meanies, Even, Kerri Simpson's Gospel Mass with Chris Wilson, Something for Kate, Bodyjar, Shihad, Honeysmack, Frontside, Slieker, Tendrils, Matt Walker and Ashley Davies, Custard, Dogbuoy, Beaverloop, Spencer P. Jones and the Last Gasp, Velvet Tongue Puppet Rock Experience, Area-7, Augie March, Combo La Revelacion, The Exotics, Ping, Wickid Force Breakers, Voitek, Merrick & Rosso |
| 1999 | Cat Power, The Donnas, Shihad, The Avalanches, SixFtHick, Tendrils, Jimmy Little, The Rectifiers, Legends of Motorsport, Mach Pelican, Augie March, Not from There, Machine Translations, Magic Dirt, Matt Walker and Ashley Davies, Loin Groin, Motor Ace, Pre.shrunk, Combo La Revelacion, Rocket Science, Dallas Crane, DJ Dexta, Honeysmack, DJ Slack, DJ Dee Dee, Down Town Brown, Wickid Force Breakers, Damien Lovelock |
| 2000 | Tim Rogers, Regurgitator, Spiderbait, Resin Dogs, The Posies, Paul Dempsey, Augie March, The Fauves, John Butler Trio, Rocket Science, Testeagles, The Porkers, Combo La Revelacion, The Grand Silent System, On Inc, Spencer P. Jones and the Last Gasp, The Casanovas, SixFtHick, Dallas Crane, DJ Slack, DJ Dee Dee, DJ Slieker, 8Bit, Greg Fleet |
| 2001 | Augie March, You Am I, Bob Log III, Dexter (with Robbie), The Monarchs, TISM, John Butler Trio, Rocket Science, 1200 Techniques, Superheist, Warped, Combo La Revelacion, Bonnie 'Prince' Billy, Silver Ray, Prop, The Dave Graney Show, The Drugs, Wetmusik, The Fergs, Greg Fleet, and more |
| 2002 | Snout, Dallas Crane, Dead Moon, Bob Mould, Sleater-Kinney, Jon Spencer Blues Explosion, Lisa Miller, Yeah Yeah Yeahs, Resin Dogs, Jebediah, The D4, 20 Miles, Jet, Paul Dempsey, 1200 Techniques, James De La Cruz, Darren Hanlon, The Drones, Combo La Revelacion, The Fauves, Hoss, The Sailors, TZU, Chant Down Soundsystem, Adam Simmons Toy Band, The Persian Rugs, The GammaRays, Anthony Menchetti |
| 2003 | Radio Birdman, Bob Log III featuring The Town Bikes, Mclusky, The Cat Empire, Tim Rogers and the Temperance Union, The Sleepy Jackson, Buck 65, Combo La Revelacion, Xavier Rudd, The Brunettes, Master Khalil Gudaz, The Mess Hall, Magic Dirt, The Shins, The Morning After Girls, Curse Ov Dialect, Ground Components, Augie March, Architecture in Helsinki, The Cants, Dexter, 2Dogs, Modey Lemon, DJ John Idem, SPOD, Beasts of Bourbon, Warped, Clare Bowditch and The Feeding Set, Treetops, Riff Random, Greg Fleet |
| 2004 | Dexter presents The Shook Daily Crew, Xavier Rudd, My Disco, The Unicorns, Rocket Science, M. Ward, Dirty Three, Dallas Crane, Wolfmother, Sage Francis, Jolie Holland, True Live, Hilltop Hoods, Combo La Revelacion, Young Heart Attack, C. W. Stoneking, Spiderbait, Dan Kelly and the Alpha Males, The Red Eyes, Dynamo, Bass Bin Laden's Ghetto Fabulous Show, Wayne Deakin, Immortal Lee County Killers II, Cobra Killer, Ground Components, 67 Special, Wolf & Cub, Always, theredsunband, Die!Die!Die!, Digger and the Pussycats |
| 2005 | The Avalanches DJ show, Stephen Malkmus and the Jicks, Cut Copy, The Grates, The Nextmen, Wolfmother, Clare Bowditch and The Feeding Set, City City City, You Am I, Billy Childish and The Buff Medways, Architecture in Helsinki, The Mess Hall, Johnny Idem, Bob Log III (mystery act), Airbourne, Okkervil River, J-Live, Sons and Daughters, Eddy Current Suppression Ring, The Kills, Matt Walker and Ashley Davies, True Live, Bollywood Spectacular, King Marong and Safara, Peeping Tom, British India, Hoodangers, Young Professionals, Blackalicious, Legends of Motorsport, City of Ballarat Municipal Brass Band, Greg Fleet, The Town Bikes |
| 2006 | My Disco, Girl Talk, Midlake, The Soundtrack of Our Lives, Augie March, Datarock, The Presets, Rose Tattoo, Band of Horses, Kid Koala, Edan, Blue King Brown, Combo La Revelacion, Tapes 'n Tapes, Wolf & Cub, Concertino Trio, Spencer P Jones and the Escape Committee, Miso, Macromantics, DJ Ransom, The Drones, Tex Perkins & Tim Rogers (TNT), The Bamboos, Sand Pebbles, Diafrix, Snowman, The New Pornographers, Cornelius, Dallas Crane, Wayne Deakin, City of Ballarat Municipal Brass Band, The Town Bikes |
| 2007 | Andrew W.K., Art Brut, Clutch, Cut Copy, Eddy Current Suppression Ring, Gossip, Gotye, Junior Reid, Little Red, Midnight Juggernauts, Ned Collette Band, Lady Strangelove, Black Lips, Sarah Blasko, King Brothers, The Smallgoods, Hoodoo Gurus, Dr. Dog, Paris Wells & Thief, Crystal Castles, The Devastations, DJ Ritchie 1250, Root!, Amanda Palmer, The Galvatrons, DJ MuGen, Combo La Revelacion, Black Pony Express, Ooh-ee, Paul Williamson Hammond Combo, Andee Frost, City of Ballarat Municipal Brass Band, Angus Sampson, The Town Bikes |
| 2008 | Adam Green, Architecture in Helsinki, Beaches, Black Diamond Heavies, Dan Sultan, Even, Final Fantasy, Grand Salvo, Holy Fuck, Kram, Little Red, Man Man, MGMT, The Mountain Goats, Muscles, Pilooski, Regurgitator, Tame Impala, Ten East, The Bronx, The Datsuns, The Ruby Suns, The Scientists of Modern Music, T Rek, Violent Soho, Yacht Club DJs, Combo La Revelacion, Saul Williams, Mountains in the Sky, City of Ballarat Municipal Brass Band, Streetparty, DJ Shags, Angus Sampson, The Town Bikes |
| 2009 | Akron / Family, Animal Collective, Bag Raiders, Jarvis Cocker, Eddy Current Suppression Ring, Witch Hats, Sia, Paul Kelly, Thee Oh Sees, Royal Crown Revue, The Middle East, Tumbleweed, Heavy Trash, Kitty, Daisy & Lewis, Why?, Patrick Wolf, Yacht Club DJs, Henrik Schwarz, Nathan Fake, Pharoahe Monch, Kid Sam, Tim Sweeney, Combo La Revelacion, City of Ballarat Municipal Brass Band, Kes Band, M.A.F.I.A., Oh Mercy, Regular John, The Dacios, The Fauves, Wagons, Yacht, Angus Sampson, The Town Bikes |
| 2010 | Neil Finn, Sharon Jones & the Dap-Kings, The Field, The Reverend Horton Heat, El Guincho, Girls, Dirty Three, Cloud Control, Broadcast, JEFF the Brotherhood, Kimbra, Washed Out, The Fall, Rat vs Possum, Pantha du Prince, DJ Harvey & DJ Garth, Little Red, Clipse, The Heatwave, Lovefingers, Kyu, Custard, C. W. Stoneking, Sally Seltmann, Those Darlins, Hypnotic Brass Ensemble, Hoss, Combo La Revelacion, The Dead Salesmen Duo, Puta Madre Brothers, City of Ballarat Municipal Brass Band, DJ MuGen, Angus Sampson, The Town Bikes |
| 2011 | Grinderman, Cut Copy, Kurt Vile & The Violators, Mudhoney, Ladyhawke, Graveyard Train, Icehouse, Explosions in the Sky, Barbariön, Off!, Gang Gang Dance, Black Joe Lewis & the Honeybears, Joelistics, Adalita, Oscar + Martin, Future of the Left, Unknown Mortal Orchestra, Dave Graney & The Lurid Yellow Mist, Dennis Cometti, Matt Sonic & The High Times, Frank Fairfield, Big Freedia, Cash Savage & The Last Drinks, Tim Sweeney, Virgo Four, Harmonic 313, Juiceboxxx, King Gizzard & the Lizard Wizard, Eagle & The Worm, Abbe May, The Rechords, The Juan Pablo Family Hour, City of Ballarat Municipal Brass Band, Silence Wedge, The Town Bikes, Angus Sampson |
| 2012 | Primal Scream, Spiritualized, Four Tet, Turbonegro, Grimes, Sunnyboys, Tame Impala, Omar Souleyman, Regurgitator, Big Jay McNeely, Chet Faker, Rahzel & DJ JS-1, Pond, Itch-E & Scratch-E, Twerps, Saskwatch, Hot Snakes, Snakadaktal, DJ Yamantaka Eye, Earthless, The Toot Toot Toots, Meredith Sky Show, Brous, Bitter Sweet Kicks, The Town Bikes, Otologic, Fraser A. Gorman & Big Harvest, Angus Sampson, Hiatus Kaiyote, DJ Flagrant VJ Show, City of Ballarat Municipal Brass Band, Silence Wedge, Royal Headache, The Murlocs, Boomgates, J.B. Smoove |
| 2013 | Chic featuring Nile Rodgers, The Brian Jonestown massacre, Deerhunter, Melvins, Jon Hopkins, Joey Badass, Helmet, Beasts of Bourbon, Spiderbait, Hermitude, Tranter, Le1f, The Bamboos, Roland Tings, Dick Diver, World's End Press, Clairy Browne & the Bangin’ Rackettes, Tim Sweeney, Derrick May, Andee Frost, Beaches, Davidson Brothers, Oliver Tank, Baptism of Uzi, The Smith Street Band, Mac DeMarco, Courtney Barnett, Stonefield, Warped, D.D Dumbo, Silence Wedge, City of Ballarat Municipal Brass Band, UV Race, Angus Sampson, The Town Bikes |
| 2014 | The War on Drugs, Tiny Ruins, Ty Segall, De La Soul, Mark Lanegan, Factory Floor, Jagwar Ma, Augie March, Sleep, James Holden, Mia Dyson, Ghostface Killah, The Skatalites, Phosphorescent, Jen Cloher, Cloud Nothings, The Lemonheads, The Town Bikes, The Bombay Royal, Vakula, Silence Wedge, Blank Realm, Painters and Dockers, Sun God Replica, City of Ballarat Municipal Brass Band, The Harpoons, Teeth & Tongue, The Public Opinion Afro Orchestra, Misty Nights, Marlon Williams, Dr Phil Smith, Krakatau, Jess McGuire, Hard-Ons |
| 2015 | Big Daddy Kane, Bully, City of Ballarat Municipal Brass Band, Drug Sweat, Father John Misty, Floating Points, Fatback Band, GL, Goat, Harvey Sutherland, Jess Ribeiro, Jessica Pratt, Julia Holter, Levins, Lucy Cliche, The Peep Tempel, Master Khalil Gudaz, Master Song Tai Chi, Jane Clifton, Meredith Sky Show, Mighty Duke and The Lords, Briggs, Moon Duo, Neon Indian, Optimo, Pearls, Power, Ratatat, Shellac, Silence Wedge, Steve Miller Band, The Thurston Moore Band, Tkay Maidza, Totally Mild, The Town Bikes, Uncle Acid and The Deadbeats, Unknown Mortal Orchestra |
| 2016 | Peaches, King Gizzard and the Lizard Wizard, Sheila E., Angel Olsen, BadBadNotGood, The Triffids, Kelela, Ben UFO, Japandroids, The Congos, Baroness, Archie Roach, Jagwar Ma, Mount Liberation Unlimited, Fred and Toody Cole, Chiara Kickdrum, Cass McCombs, The Goon Sax, Ross Wilson, CC:Disco!, Cable Ties, Wilson Tanner, Silence Wedge, The Sugarcanes, Throwing Shade, The Breadmakers, Mondo Freaks, Miss Destiny, City of Ballarat Municipal Brass Band, Master Song Tai Chi, The Town Bikes, Terry, Judith Lucy, Sheer Mag, Dungen |
| 2017 | Silence Wedge, Todd Terje & The Olsens, Noname, ESG, Total Control, !!!, Future Islands, Warpaint, Downtown Boys, Mark Seymour and The Undertow, Aldous Harding, Harvey Sutherland & Bermuda, Amyl and the Sniffers, Big Thief, Pissed Jeans, Various Asses, Japanese Breakfast, RVG, The Teskey Brothers, Sleep D, The Senegambian Jazz Band, Rings Around Saturn, Kikagaku Moyo, Late Nite Tuff Guy, Miss Blanks, The Stevens, The Exotics, Ross McHenry Trio, Emma Russack, Moopie, Suss Cunts, Meredith Sky Show, City of Ballarat Municipal Brass Band, Master Song Tai Chi, Gabriella Bartonova, The Huxleys, Fee B2 |
| 2018 | The Breeders, Billy Bragg, The Presets, Yaeji, Sampa the Great, Panda Bear, The Founding Father of House Lil Louis, Laura Jean, Pond, DJ Jnett, Mambali, Montero, Nadia Rose, The Aints!, The Pharcyde, Mildlife, Mental As Anything, Roza Terenzi, The Native Cats, Mim Suleiman, Tourist Kid, Time for Dreams, Zeitgeist Freedom Energy Exchange, DJ Lady Erica, Ooga Boogas, The Seven Ups, Genesis Owusu, Sui Zhen, Little Ugly Girls, Clypso, Shrimpwitch, City of Ballarat Municipal Brass Band, Master Song Tai Chi, Gabriella Bartonova, The Huxleys, Fee B2 |
| 2019 | Liam Gallagher, Róisín Murphy, Briggs, Helena Hauff, Amyl and the Sniffers, DJ Koze, Julia Jacklin, Dead Prez, Viagra Boys, Cate Le Bon, The Egyptian Lover, Christine Anu, Logic1000, Jesswar, Stompin' Riffraffs, U-Bahn, Eric Powell, Vanessa Worm, Digital Afrika, Gordon Koang, Scott & Charlene's Wedding, Ooga Boogas, Wvr Bvby, Constant Mongrel, Rambl, Diimpa, Sweet Whirl, Karate Boogaloo, The Faculty, Hooligan Hefs, Close Counters, River Yarra, City of Ballarat Municipal Brass Band, Master Song Tai Chi, Gabriella Bartonova, The Huxleys, Fee B2, Sarah Smith, Geraldine Hickey |
| 2022 | Caribou, Yothu Yindi, Courtney Barnett, The Comet Is Coming, Dry Cleaning, Tkay Maidza, Sharon Van Etten, Nu Genea, DJ Quik, Erika de Casier, Babe Rainbow, Derrick Carter, Private Function, Shouse, Clamm, Minami Deutsch, Tasman Keith, Surprise Chef, Our Carlson, Darcy Justice, Pookie, Rot TV, OK EG, Allara, Rubi Du, Big Wett, Snowy Band, Michael Beach, Lou, Smooch, Uncle Barry Gilson & Meninyan, Interstitial DJs, City of Ballarat Municipal Brass Band, Silence Wedge, Master Song Tai Chi, Gabriella Bartonova, The Huxleys, Fee B2, Aretha Brown, Daphni |
| 2023 | Kraftwerk, Caroline Polachek, Alvvays, Alex G, Eris Drew & Octo Octa, Flowdan, Pigs Pigs Pigs Pigs Pigs Pigs Pigs, Sneaky Sound System, No Fixed Address, Souls of Mischief, Cable Ties, Blawan, Floodlights, Moktar, Telenova, They Hate Change, C.O.F.F.I.N., Dameeeela, Bumpy, Kuniyuki, Meninyan, Miss Kaninna, Gut Health, Ali, Milo Eastwood, Watty Thompson, Mary Lattimore, Pachyman, 30/70, Zoë Coombs Marr, Hannah Cameron, Andrew Tuttle, City of Ballarat Municipal Brass Band, Dragnet |
| 2024 | Jamie xx, Waxahatchee, Genesis Owusu, Mk.gee, Zapp, Angie McMahon, The Dare, Glass Beams, Mannequin Pussy, Barkaa, Fat White Family, Leo Sayer, Essendon Airport, Party Dozen, Princess Superstar, Olof Dreijer, Mike, Good Morning, Frenzee, Mainline Magic Orchestra, DJ PGZ, Maple Glider, Precious Bloom, Ayebatonye, Keanu Nelson, In2stellar, Yara, Billiam & The Split Bills, Cool Sounds, Don Glori, Hot Tubs Time Machine, Sez, Interstitial DJs, City of Ballarat Municipal Brass Band |
| 2025 | TV On The Radio, Atarashii Gakko!, Perfume Genius, Folk Bitch Trio, Pa Salieu, Colin Hay, HAAi, Chet Faker, Bar Italia, Omar Souleyman, Dames Brown, Mildlife, Ninajirachi, Oddisee & The Good Company, Saya Gray, RONA., Sam Austins, Radio Free Alice, RP Boo, Jack J, Dr Sure's Unusual Practice, Drifting Clouds, Florist, Guy Blackman, Central Australian Aboriginal Women's Choir, Brown Spirits, Mouseatouille, Lazy Susan (Meredith Gift MC), Wax'o Paradiso, Rhysics, June Jones, The Prize, City of Ballarat Municipal Brass Band |
| 2026 | Eddy Current Suppression Ring, Dijon, Underscores, Fcukers, The Dandy Warhols, Hiatus Kaiyote, DJ Seinfeld, D Train & Mondo Freaks, Fat Dog, Suzanne Ciani, Sophia Stel, Show Me the Body, Twisted Teens, Marcellus Pittman, Killing Heidi, Spike Fuck, Ella Thompson, Yikes, Docker River Band, DJ Love, Tara Clerkin Trio, Jorg Kuning, Blue Communications, Miles Nautu, Hana Stretton, Media Puzzle, City of Ballarat Municipal Brass Band |

== Awards ==
=== Music Victoria Awards ===
The Music Victoria Awards are an annual awards night celebrating Victorian music. They commenced in 2006. The award for Best Festival was introduced in 2013.

| Year | Nominee / work | Award | Result | Ref. |
|---|---|---|---|---|
| Music Victoria Awards of 2013 | Meredith Music Festival | Best Festival | Won | |
| Music Victoria Awards of 2014 | Meredith Music Festival | Best Festival | Won | |
| Music Victoria Awards of 2016 | Meredith Music Festival | Best Festival | Won | |
| Music Victoria Awards of 2017 | Meredith Music Festival | Best Festival | Won | |
| Music Victoria Awards of 2018 | Meredith Music Festival | Best Festival | Nominated | |
| Music Victoria Awards of 2019 | Meredith Music Festival | Best Festival | Nominated | |

== See also ==
- Golden Plains Festival
