= Golden Plains Festival =

Festival in Victoria, Australia

Coordinates: 37°50′48″S 143°55′55″E

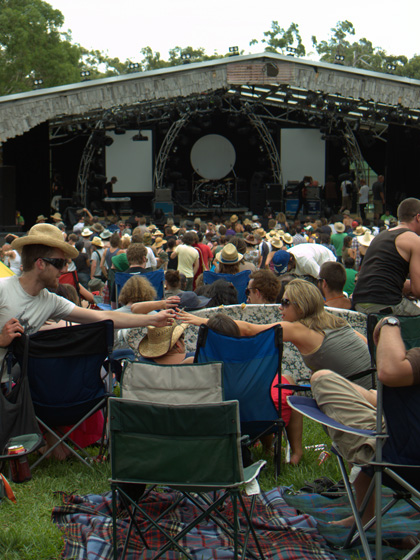
- Genre: Various
- Dates: Victorian Labour Day Weekend
- Locations: Victoria, Australia
- Years active: 2007–2020, 2023–
- Website: goldenplains.com.au

The Golden Plains Festival is held over three days during the Victorian Labour Day long-weekend on private farmland in Victoria, Australia. The nearest rural town is Meredith, which is between the regional cities of Geelong and Ballarat. The closest metropolitan city is Melbourne, 90 kilometres away.

== Background ==
Golden Plains is an outdoor camping festival in Australian bushland. The farmland is nicknamed the Meredith Supernatural Amphitheatre for the event; the natural amphitheatre itself is where the bands play. The surrounding areas – with names such as Spring Valley, North Pines, Mulwaverley, Tasmania, Kevin and West Kevin host bush camping. Most festival attendees sleep in tents or vans.

The band-viewing area, the amphitheatre, has views over typical Western District farmland. There is only one stage at Meredith, which serves to concentrate attention on the music. Views from around the amphitheatre are unimpeded. The stage is nestled in a grove of native Australian eucalyptus trees.

Golden Plains has a non-commercial ethos, which is a major point of difference between it and other outdoor music festivals. It has no commercial sponsors and there is no commercial signage on the site. Attendees must bring their own alcohol only (in plastic or cans, not glass) – except for the Pink Flamingo Bar, open to those over 18 for cocktails. All fires are prohibited, so attendees usually buy food on-site. There are food and coffee outlets to the left and right of the stage area.

Artists to have played at the festival include Bon Iver, Nile Rodgers, Pavement, Cat Power, Moodymann, Mulatu Astake, Tallest Man On Earth, George Clinton, Yo La Tengo, Comets on Fire, Ween, Sharon Jones & The Dap-Kings, Beirut, The Dirtbombs, The Slits, Fat Freddy's Drop, The Presets, The Drones, The Vines, Iron and Wine, Gotye, Jay Reatard, Mad Professor, Gary Numan, Sebastian & Kavinsky, Quintron And Miss Pussycat, Royal Headache, Muscles and many more.

Golden Plains 2010 featured cult American act Pavement, playing their second show on a worldwide reunion tour of 2010. The event also featured the likes of Calexico, Dinosaur Jr, The Dirty Projectors, The Big Pink, Antibalas Afrobeat Orchestra and Tame Impala.

The land on which the festival takes place is owned by the Nolan family. The first festival was held in 2007, and was sold out and attended by 7,500 people. The 2009 Golden Plains Festival was held on the second weekend in March.

Golden Plains has twice won 'Australia's Favorite Festival' in Faster Louder's Festival Awards. voted by the festival-going public. The event was named best overall event and Best Management & Facilities in 2008 & 2009.

The 2020 festival missed the national lockdown imposed soon after it ran, but the 2021 festival was cancelled in December 2020.

== Awards and nominations ==
=== Music Victoria Awards ===
The Music Victoria Awards, are an annual awards night celebrating Victorian music. They commenced in 2005.

Year	Nominee / work	Award	Result
2015	Golden Plains Festival	Best Festival	Won
2017	Golden Plains Festival	Best Festival	Nominated
2018	Golden Plains Festival	Best Festival	Won
2019	Golden Plains Festival	Best Festival	Won
2020	Golden Plains Festival	Best Festival	Won

=== National Live Music Awards ===
The National Live Music Awards (NLMAs) are a broad recognition of Australia's diverse live industry, celebrating the success of the Australian live scene. The awards commenced in 2016.

Year	Nominee / work	Award	Result
National Live Music Awards of 2017	Golden Plains Festival	Live Event of the Year	Nominated
National Live Music Awards of 2017	Golden Plains Festival	Victorian Live Event of the Yeart	Won

== Golden Plains Lineups ==
This is a list of Golden Plains lineups by year:

Year	Artist
2007	The Bellrays, Fat Freddy's Drop, Yo La Tengo, !!!, The Presets, Mad Professor, Gotye, The Avalanches DJ Show, Comets On Fire, Dexter, The Slits, Sebastian and Kavinsky (Ed Banger Tour), Darren Hanlon, The Drones, Eddy Current Suppression Ring, Shooting At Unarmed Men, Dudley Perkins and Georgia Anne Muldrow, Muph and Plutonic, Ground Components, Riot In Belgium, Nick Thayer, Mountains In The Sky, Sunwrae Ensemble, Sleater Brockman, Jamaica Irie with RuCL and Jigzie Campbell, Muscles, George Rrurrambu and Birdwave, Silence Is Golden
2008	Ween, Sharon Jones and The Dap Kings, The Vines, Iron and Wine, Beirut, Optimo, The Bang Gang Deejays, The Dirtbombs, The Panics, Jens Lekman, Kid Koala, British India, The Bamboos, South Rakkas Crew, Buffalo Tom, Jay Reatard, Scientists Of Modern Music, Future Of The Left, Jane Badler and Sir, Kamikaze Trio, Pikelet, Qua, The Frowning Clouds, Research and Development, The Sea and Cake
2009	Mogwai, Tony Allen, Gary Numan, Black Mountain, Of Montreal, The Drones, The Church, Dan Deacon, Brant Bjork and The Bros, Old Crow Medicine Show, My Disco, Pivot, Bridezilla, Jim White and John Doe, DJ Mujava, Dan Kelly with The Ukeladies, Canyons, Quintron and Miss Pussycat, The Black Seeds, Luluc, The Harpoons, Deaf Wish, Sweet Jelly Roll DJs, You Am I, DJ Chris Gill, Opulent Sound System, Jimmy Sing
2010	Pavement, Dinosaur Jr, Dirty Projectors, The Big Pink, Midnight Juggernauts, Tame Impala, Super Wild Horses, Optimo, Calexico, Monotonix, Gaslamp Killer, Nashville Pussy, Jeffrey Lewis and The Junkyard, The Cruel Sea, Crayon Fields, Ransom, Andee Frost, Wooden Shjips, Royal Headache, Clairy Baby Browne and The Bangin' Rackettes, Antibalas Afrobeat Orchestra, Scattermusic Sound System, Jack Ladder, Space Invadas, Opulent Sound
2011	Os Mutantes, The Hold Steady, Joanna Newsom, Belle & Sebastian, Best Coast, Architecture In Helsinki, Wavves, Hawkwind, Jamie Lidell, The Clean, The Middle East, Boy & Bear, Mount Kimbie, Airbourne, Robert Forster, Pulled Apart By Horses, The Besnard Lakes, Cosmic Psychos, Justin Townes Earle, Wildbirds & Peacedrums, Imelda May, Bamboo Musik DJs, Graveyard Train, Brain Children, World's End Press, J-Wow feat MC Kalaf, Magic Kids, Sonny & The Sunsets
2012	Bon Iver, Chic featuring Nile Rodgers, Roky Erickson, Roots Manuva, Bonnie "Prince" Billy featuring The Cairo Gang, Wild Flag, Charles Bradley & His Extraordinaires, Black Lips, Urge Overkill, Ariel Pink's Haunted Graffiti, Real Estate, First Aid Kit, Dexter, Kisstroyer, Endless Boogie, Lanie Lane, The Celibate Rifles, Canyons, Harmony, Total Control, Lost Animal, Seekae, Naysayer and Gilsun, Saskwatch, Two Bright Lakes DJs, This Thing, Hunting Grounds, Silence Is Golden, Barry Dickins
2013	Cat Power, Dinosaur Jr, Tallest Man On Earth, George Clinton and Parliament Funkadelic, The Jon Spencer Blues Explosion, Moodymann, Purity Ring, Julio Bashmore, The Mark Of Cain, Flume, Naysayer and Gilsun, Toro Y Moi, Wild Nothing, Psarandonis, Client Liaison, Melbourne Ska Orchestra, Mulatu Astatke with Black Jesus Experience, Dick Diver, Keb Darge, Opossom, Chris Russell's Chicken Walk, Bushwalking, Money For Rope, Barry Dickins, A Chat with Jack Nolan, Zanzibar Chanel, No Zu, Silence Is Golden, Post Percy, Redd Kross
2014	You Am I, Public Enemy, Flying Lotus, Fat Freddy's Drop, Neko Case, Yo La Tengo, Cut Copy, Charles Bradley and His Extraordinaires, The Drones, Adalita, Chet Faker, Gold Panda, Seekae, Cosmic Psychos, King Gizzard and the Lizard Wizard, Los Coronas, Michael Leunig, Hiatus Kaiyote, Osaka Monaurail, Mark Pritchard, Tornado Wallace, SixFtHick, Archer, The Orbweavers, The Perch Creek Family Jugband, JPS (The Operatives), DJ Jnett, Spacey Space, Silence Is Golden, Andras Fox featuring Oscar Key Sung
2015	Aldous Harding, Banoffee, Black Vanilla, Bombino, Conor Oberst, Courtney Barnett, DJ Shadow & Cut Chemist, Edd Fisher, Felice Brothers, First Aid Kit, Graveyard, HITS, LA Pocock, Milwaukee Banks, Neneh Cherry with RocketNumberNine+, Nick Waterhouse, Oblivians, Parquet Courts, Radio Birdman, Sharon Van Etten, Silence Is Golden, Sleep D, Soil & "Pimp" Sessions, Something For Kate, Stephen Malkmus and the Jicks, The Bennies, The Meanies, Theo Parrish, Total Giovanni, Twerps, Village People
2016	Sleater-Kinney, Eddy Current Suppression Ring, Violent Femmes, HTRK, Seun Kuti & Egypt 80, The Necks, The Black Madonna, John Grant, C.W. Stoneking, Freddie Gibbs, Natalie Prass, U.S. Girls, Kenji Takimi, Royal Headache, Buzzcocks, Gold Class, Black Cab, Sampa The Great, Tyrannamen, Sadar Bahar, Tom of England, Emma Donovan & The Putbacks, No Zu, Koi Child, Darcy Baylis, friendships, Songhoy Blues, Built To Spill
2017	Neil Finn, Nicolas Jaar, Margaret Glaspy, The Specials, Kurt Vile, Chain & The Gang, Total Giovanni, Teenage Fanclub, Princess Nokia, Olympia, Camp Cope, Orb, The Damned, Habits, Cash Savage and The Last Drinks, Ausmuteants, JAZZ Party, Benny and The Flybyniters, Wax'o Paradiso, The Dusty Millers, Brooke Powers, Billy Davis & The Good Lords, Kardajala Kirridarra ft. Eleanor Dixon, Oren Ambarchi, REMI, Harold, The Pilotwings, Confidence Man, Silence Is Golden, The Peep Tempel
2018	Big Boi, The Avalanches, Mogwai, Kamasi Washington, Waterfall Person, King Krule, The Preatures, Grizzly Bear, The Black Angels, Floating Points (solo live), Jen Cloher, Wet Lips, Lee Fields & The Expressions, Objekt, Tropical Fuck Storm, Adrian Sherwood, Perfume Genius, Batpiss, Kaiit, Rocket Science, Baker Boy, Toni Yotzi, Leah Senior, Barbara Tucker, MzRizk, Ata Kak, DJ Manchild, Merve, Thundercat
2019	Beach House, Happy Mondays, Four Tet, Confidence Man, The Internet, The Jesus and Mary Chain, DJ Harvey, Marlon Williams, Magic Dirt, Acid Mothers Temple & The Melting Paraiso UFO, Liz Phair, Khruangbin, Amp Fiddler, Rhye, Millu & Pjenne, Gregor, Hatchie, Hieroglyphic Being (Live), Honey, Raw Humps, Horatio Luna, DRMNGNOW, Flohio, The Living Eyes, Danny Krivit, Shannon & the Clams, SK Simeon
2020	Pixies, Hot Chip, Sampa The Great, Bill Callahan, Evelyn "Champagne" King with Mondo Freaks, Stereolab, DJ Sprinkles, Sleaford Mods, Floorplan, Weyes Blood, Electric Fields, Joe Camilleri and The Black Sorrows, Parsnip, Ezra Collective, Civic, Moonchild Sanelly, Bananagun, General Levy, Prequel, J. McFarlane's Reality Guest, Simona Castricum, C.FRIM, Yirinda, Mwanjé, Slim Set, Pinch Points, Bufiman, Agung Mango
2021 & 2022	Not held due to the COVID-19 pandemic
2023	Bikini Kill, Four Tet, Carly Rae Jepsen, Mdou Moctar, Soul II Soul, Angel Olsen, Rolling Blackouts Coastal Fever, Brian Jackson, Overmono (live), Earthless, Rochelle Jordan, Methyl Ethel, Kokoroko, Andrew Gurruwiwi Band, Stiff Richards, Armand Hammer, Soichi Terada, Mo'Ju, Rick Wilhite, Freya Josephine Hollick, Jennifer Loveless, E Fishpool, Mulalo, Delivery, DJ Kiti, EXEK, 1300, Silence Is Golden, Storytelling with Uncle Barry, Interstitial DJs, Sarah Smith, Urvi Majumdar
2024	The Streets, Yussef Dayes, King Stingray, Jeff Mills presents Tomorrow Comes The Harvest feat. Jean-Phi Dary and Prabhu Edouard, Black Country, New Road, Cymande, Regurgitator, Charlotte Adigéry & Bolis Pupul, WITCH (We Intend To Cause Havoc), Boris, Wednesday, Kutcha Edwards, RVG, Braxe + Falcon, Baro Sura & Silentjay, Anz, MJ Lenderman, DJ Koco, Sarah Mary Chadwick, Elsy Wameyo, Soju Gang, Split System, The Belair Lip Bombs, Sneaks, Sunshine and Disco Faith Choir, The Slingers, Kia, Vv Pete, Ben Fester, Storytelling with Uncle Barry
2025	PJ Harvey, Fontaines D.C., 2manydjs (DJ Set), Thelma Plum, Magdalena Bay, Robin S., Durand Jones & The Indications, Osees, Kneecap, Hermanos Gutiérrez, Bonny Light Horseman, Bahamadia, Sofia Kortesis, Grace Cummings, Ela Minus, Wet Kiss, Mulga Bore Hard Rock, Sun Ra Arkestra, Skeleten, Teether & Kuya Neil, Adriana, Jada Weazel, Zjoso, Elliot & Vincent, R.M.F.C., Reptant, Acopia, CCL, Storytelling with Uncle Barry

== See also ==
- Meredith Music Festival
