= 2024 Music Victoria Awards =

Annual Australian music awards ceremony

- Date: 24 October 2024
- Venue: Federation Square

Highlights
- Most nominations: G Flip, Ninajirachi (3)

The 2024 Music Victoria Awards were the 19th Annual Music Victoria Awards. The ceremony took place on 24 October 2024. The nominees were announced on 2 September 2024. Public voting was open from 2 September until 1 October 2024.

On 28 November 2024, Music Victoria announced "that voting for its 2024 awards had been targeted by 'unknown assailant/s'" and Police were involved. Music Victoria confirmed that new winners were announced in five of the six publicly voted categories, however, the original winners will also get to retain the honours.

== Hall of Fame inductees ==
- Ollie Olsen
- The Push (Australian youth music organisation)

== Award nominees and winners ==
Winners indicated at the top and in boldface, with other nominees in plain.

=== Public Voted Awards ===
Best Album	Best Song or Track
**Gregor - Satanic Lullabies** (originally announced winner); **Angie McMahon - Light, Dark, Light Again** (corrected announced winner); G Flip - Drummer; The Belair Lip Bombs - Lush Life; The Vovos - Lilla Gubben	**Good Morning - "Excalibur"** (originally announced winner); **Jess Ribeiro - "Summer of Love"** (corrected announced winner); Drmngnow - "Ngarwu"; Kaiit - "Space"; Miss Kaninna - "Pinnacle Bitch"
Best Solo Artist	Best Group
**Audrey Powne** (originally announced winner); **Maple Glider** (corrected announced winner); G Flip; Lucy Wise; Simona Castricum	**RVG** (originally announced winner); **Gut Health** (corrected announced winner); Cool Sounds; Hiatus Kaiyote; Mindy Meng Wang (王萌) & Sui Zhen
Best DJ	Best Regional Act
**DJ PGZ**; Aldonna; IN2STELLAR; Ninajirachi; Tinika	**ZÖJ** (originally announced winner); **Leah Senior** (corrected announced winner); Baraka the Kid; Eliza Hull; Juno Mamba

=== Industry Voted Awards ===
Best Musician	Best Producer
**Cheryl Durongpisitkul**; Erica Tucceri; Hudson Whitlock; Lewis Coleman; Lucky Pereira	**Lauren Coutts**; Bonnie Knight; Nao Anzai; Ninajirachi; Theo Carbo
Arts Access Amplify Award	Diaspora Award
**Saint Ergo**; Among The Restless; Magdalia; Naavikaran; R.em.edy	**Wild Gloriosa**; Amaru Tribe; Hand to Earth; Jarabi Band; Mindy Meng Wang (王萌) & Sui Zhen
Best Blues Work	Best Country Work
**Opelousas**; Checkerboard Lounge; Lloyd Spiegel; Nigel Wearne; The McNaMarr Project	**Hana & Jessie-Lee's Bad Habits**; Matt Joe Gow & Kerryn Fields; Patrick Wilson; Sweet Talk; The Counterfeit
Best Electronic Work	Best Experimental Act or Avant-Garde Work
**Hybrid Man**; Ninajirachi; Simona Castricum; Smilk; Spoonbill	**Hand to Earth**; Duré Dara and Speak Percussion; Hantu; Monica Lim; Panghalina
Best Folk Work	Best Heavy Work
**Evan & Mischa**; Ernest Aines; Lucy Wise; Mickey & Michelle; The Bashevis Singers	**Pizza Death**; Diploid; Religious Observance; Suldusk; The Incantus
Best Hip Hop Work	Best Jazz Work
**Fly Boy Jack**; Baraka the Kid; MAMMOTH. & Eric Spice; Srirachi; Yung Shōgun	**Michelle Nicolle**; Finn Rees; Helen Svoboda; James Sherlock Trio; Vanessa Perica Orchestra
Best Pop Work	Best Reggae and Dancehall Work
**Gretta Ray**; Blusher; G Flip; The Cat Empire; Tones and I	**JahWise**; Killah Keys; Melbourne Ska Orchestra; Rick Howe; Shottaz
Best Rock/Punk Work	Soul, Funk, RNB & Gospel Work
**The Belair Lip Bombs**; Dr Sure's Unusual Practice; Enola; Porpoise Spit; The Vovos	**Tekoa**; Emeree; Emma Volard; Mildlife; Squid Nebula
Best Metro Festival	Best Regional Festival
**St Kilda Festival (Boon Wurrung)**; Flippin' the Bird - Frankston (Bunurong); LuliePalooza - Abbotsford (Wurundjeri); Melbourne International Jazz Festival (Wurundjeri and Boonwurrung); Yo CiTY CONNECT: AFRO-FUTURE - Abbotsford (Wurundjeri)	**NYE On The Hill Bass Coast (Bunurong)**; Beyond the Valley - Golden Plains Festival (Wadawurrung); Loch Hart Music Festival (Kirrae Whurrung); Port Fairy Folk Festival (Gunditjmara); Queenscliff Music Festival (Wadawurrung)
Best Large Venue (Metro)	Best Small Venue (Metro)
**Corner Hotel - Richmond (Wurundjeri)**; Elisabeth Murdoch Hall, Melbourne Recital Centre (Wurundjeri and Bunurong); Forum Melbourne (Wurundjeri and Bunurong); Northcote Theatre (Wurundjeri); Palais Theatre - St Kilda (Bunurong)	**Northcote Social Club (Wurundjeri)**; MOTH - Mornington Peninsula (Bunurong); Kindred Bandroom - Footscray (Wurundjeri); Lulie Tavern - Collingwood (Wurundjeri); The JazzLab - Brunswick (Wurundjeri)
Best Regional Venue/Presenter (over 50 gigs a year)	Best Regional Venue/Presenter (under 50 gigs a year)
**Torquay Hotel - (Wadawarrung)**; The Barwon Club Hotel - Geelong (Wadawurrung); The Bridge Hotel - Castlemaine (Dja Dja Wurrung); The Coolroom at the Northern Arts Hotel - Castlemaine (Dja Dja Wurrung); Volta - Ballarat (Wadawurrung)	**The Sound Doctor - Anglesea (Wadawurrung)**; The Blues Train - Bellarine Peninsula (Wadawurrung); Meeniyan Town Hall - South Gippsland (Bunurong); The Gallery of Good - Trafalgar (Gunaikurnai); OK Motels - Charlton (Dja Dja Wurrung), Ballarat (Wadawurrung), Shepparton (Yorta Yorta)
