= Anna Laverty =

Music producer

- Born: Anna Webster
- Occupation: Music producer
- Years active: 2008–present
- Awards: Studio Production Award at the Australian Women in Music Awards 2018
- Website: www.annalaverty.com

Anna Laverty (née Webster) is a music producer who has been active in London and Australia since 2008. In 2018 she won the Studio Production Award at the Australian Women in Music Awards.

She has worked in a variety of roles including engineer, producer, mixer, and vocals engineer, working on award-winning recordings with artists such as Lady Gaga and Nick Cave and the Bad Seeds. She was the recording engineer on the 2019 TV show The Recording Studio, which won the 2019 ARIA Award for Best Original Soundtrack.

== History ==
Laverty wanted to be a sound engineer from about the age of 15. She studied sound engineering at Western Australian Academy of Performing Arts (WAAPA).

On graduating she travelled to London where she worked in various roles including at a record store, running indie club nights, and starting a record label. She secured a job as assistant engineer at Miloco Studios where she worked with Ben Hillier (U2, Blur, Elbow) and Paul Epworth (Adele, Azealia Banks). In this time she assisted on a number of records with international acts including Florence and the Machine, Bloc Party, Depeche Mode, Travis and Jarvis Cocker.

She returned to Australia and freelanced at Sing Sing Studios in Melbourne. Laverty was the assistant to Adam Rhodes and Steven Schram, before getting her own gigs.

Laverty has volunteered on projects such as Girls Rock!, which is a music camp for young females, trans and gender diverse people. She has also volunteered with the Audrey Recording Initiative, where young women can apply to have their first recording experience.

She worked as a producer for the SongMakers program run by APRA AMCOS, mentoring students who are interested in a career in music, in a program where they recorded and performed original songs.

In 2018 Laverty was a recording engineer for the Vast Project. Vast was a "collaborative project conceived in an historic desert settlement in the Western Australia Pilbara region, featuring music inspired by the landscape that celebrates the history and culture of the desert land." according to Double J.

In 2018 she won the Studio Production Award at the Australian Women in Music Awards.

In 2019 Laverty appeared on the ABC television program The Recording Studio as the sound engineer for every episode.

Laverty managed Newmarket Studios for 6 months in 2019.

== Awards and nominations ==
=== Australian Women in Music Awards ===
The Australian Women in Music Awards is an annual event that celebrates outstanding women in the Australian Music Industry who have made significant and lasting contributions in their chosen field. They commenced in 2018.

Year	Nominee / work	Award	Result
2018	Anna Laverty	Studio Production Award	Won

=== Music Victoria Awards ===
The Music Victoria Awards, are an annual awards night celebrating Victorian music. They commenced in 2005.

Year	Nominee / work	Award	Result	Ref.
2020	herself for Milk on Milk	Best Producer	Nominated	
2020	Anna Laverty	Outstanding Woman in Music	Nominated	
2021	Anna Laverty	Best Producer	Nominated	
2023	Anna Laverty	Best Producer	Nominated	

== Recordings ==
- Florence and the Machine - Lungs (2009) - Assistant. Lungs peaked at number 1 on the UK Albums Chart.
- Lady Gaga - "Born This Way" (2011) - Assistant. "Born This Way" peaked at number 1 on the Billboard Hot 100. It won the 2011 MTV Europe Award for Best Song.
- Kate Miller-Heidke - Nightflight (2012) - Engineer, Vocal Engineer, Additional Production. Nightflight peaked at number 2 on the ARIA charts.
- Nick Cave and the Bad Seeds - Push the Sky Away (2013) - Assistant Engineer, Vocal Engineer, Recording Assistant. Push the Sky Away reached number 3 in the UK Albums Chart. At the 2014 Ivor Novello Awards it won the Ivors Inspiration Award in the album category.
- Cut Copy - Free Your Mind (2013) - Engineer
- The Peep Tempel - Tales (2014) - Engineer. Tales was shortlisted for the 2014 Australian Music Prize.
- Courtney Barnett - New Speedway Boogie (2016) - Engineer, mixing, producer
- Various Artists - The Recording Studio. Winner of ARIA Award for Best Original Soundtrack 2019.
