= Ross McLennan =

Ross McLennan may refer to:

- Ross McLennan (singer), Australian singer, formerly with Snout
- Ross McLennan (drummer), Australian drummer with The Predators
