= Raph Rashid =

Australian restaurateur

- Born: Australia
- Occupations: Restaurateur, Author, Photographer
- Years active: 2009–present
- Known for: Founder of Beatbox Kitchen, Taco Truck, All Day Donuts, Juanita Peaches
- Notable work: Hungry for That (2014), Behind The Beat (2012), Back to the Lab (2017)
- Website: beatboxkitchen.com

Raph Rashid is an Australian restaurateur, author, and photographer.

He is primarily known for various food trucks started in Melbourne. His businesses include Beatbox Kitchen, All Day Donuts, and Juanita Peaches, and Taco Truck. Prior to starting food trucks, he sold clothing at various music gigs under the label 'Blank TM'. He later travelled the United States as a photographer, and photographed J Dilla. Through his travels in the US he saw how prevalent food trucks were in that country, and upon his return to Melbourne he set up the city's first hamburger truck 'Beatbox Kitchen'. The truck debuted at Meredith music festival. He has been described by the Herald Sun as 'the founding father of Melbourne's food truck scene'.

His first beatbox kitchen truck started in 2009, (then called 'Beatbox burgers') in Brunswick.

In 2017 beatbox kitchen opened a permanent location, and in 2021 it closed down. The trucks continue to operate.

In 2020 he started an online cooking show named 'Raph's mean cuisine', featuring various guests from Melbourne's food scene. He is the author of three books, Hungry for That: Recipes from the Beatbox Kitchen (2014), a book of recipes from his hamburger truck, and Behind The Beat (2012) and Back to the Lab: Hip Hop Home Studios (2017), two collections of photographs of hip hop producers' home studio setups.
