= Lush Life (The Belair Lip Bombs album) =

2023 debut album

Studio album by the Belair Lip Bombs
- Released: 25 August 2023
- Studio: Head Gap, Preston, Victoria
- Genre: Indie rock; garage rock
- Length: 33:09
- Label: Cousin Will
- Producer: Nao Anzai; The Belair Lip Bombs

The Belair Lip Bombs chronology
Songs to Do Your Laundry To (2019)	Lush Life (2023)	Again (2025)

Singles from Lush Life
- 1. "Say My Name" Released: 4 May 2023; 2. "Gimme Gimme" Released: 2 June 2023; 3. "Look the Part" Released: 7 July 2023; 4. "Stay or Go" Released: 10 August 2023

Lush Life is the debut studio album by Australian indie rock band the Belair Lip Bombs. It was released on 25 August 2023 via Cousin Will Records, and re-issued by Third Man Records in 2024 to become the label's first Australian record. Preceded by four singles, Lush Life was released to critical acclaim, and won Best Rock or Punk Work at the 2024 Music Victoria Awards.

== Recording ==
Some songs on Lush Life were written years prior to recording. "Gimme Gimme" was the oldest, written in 2020—it took the band years to complete its structure and vocal melodies. "Suck It In" dates back to a demo recorded in 2021. Conversely, "World Is the One" was written in one day.

Vocal recording sessions lasted up to 15 hours at a time, as frontwoman Maisie Everett wanted to perfectly match the idea in her head of how each song sounded. "Things That You Did" features the Belair Lip Bombs' first musical guest, Sarah Hellyer from Floodlights playing trumpet.

== Composition ==
Lush Life thematically explores "having an imperfect life yet always striving for something better," according to Jason West of New Noise Magazine. In her lyrics, Everett reminisces on a past relationship on the opening track "Say My Name", and desperately tries to reclaim this sense of connection on "Gimme Gimme". The desire for a perfect life is considered on "Stay or Go", as Everett questions if working towards her dreams will be worth it.

Primarily an indie rock record, with shades of jangle pop and new wave, music critics made comparisons to the Strokes (particularly from their Room on Fire era), Pavement and the Breeders.

== Release ==
The Belair Lip Bombs released Lush Life on 25 August 2023, issued via Melbourne-based independent label Cousin Will Records. In August 2024, the group became the first Australians to sign with Nashville-based label Third Man Records, who re-issued Lush Life on vinyl.

== Critical reception ==
Professional ratings
Review scores
Source	Rating
New Noise Magazine	4.5/5 stars
NME	4/5 stars
Pitchfork	7.8/10

Lush Life received acclaim from music critics, who were particularly impressed by the range of styles on display. According to Doug Wallen of British music magazine NME, the Belair Lip Bombs "mov[e] between a spirited range of styles" in a way that may have sounded unfocused for groups less honed. Shaad D'Souza of The Guardian said the album's first 10 minutes alone featured some of the catchiest choruses he'd heard in the past year, calling Lush Life "the kind of punchy, hook-laden rock record that hardly gets made any more, straightforward in sound but borderline unassailable in its construction." Reviewing for American publication Pitchfork, Laura Snapes called the album a "classic power-pop rager that’s euphoric and greyhound-lithe."

At the 2024 Music Victoria Awards, Lush Life won Best Rock or Punk Work, and was nominated for Best Album.

== Track listing ==
All lyrics are written by Maisie Everett.

No.	Title	Length
1.	"Say My Name"	3:53
2.	"Gimme Gimme"	3:11
3.	"World Is the One"	1:51
4.	"Stay or Go"	2:36
5.	"Easy on the Heart"	3:48
6.	"Look the Part"	3:53
7.	"Walking Away"	2:42
8.	"Things That You Did"	3:46
9.	"Lucky Nine"	3:49
10.	"Suck It In"	3:36
Total length:		33:09

== Personnel ==
- Nao Anzai – production, mixing, mastering
- The Belair Lip Bombs – production
- Max Dangerfield – vocal recording and production
- Sarah Hellyer – trumpet (tracks 8, 10)
