= Couleurs Primaires =

EP
- Released: January 19, 2015
- Recorded: 2013–2014
- Genre: House, pop
- Label: Barclay

chronology
Hemisphere (2012)	Couleurs Primaires (2015)

Singles from Couleurs Primaires
- 1. "Garde Le Pour Toi" Released: June 11, 2014; 2. "Sur Une Chanson En Français" Released: November 10, 2014

Couleurs Primaires is the debut EP by Parisian duo Paradis released on January 19, 2015 under label Barclay. The album features 3 originally composed tracks by Paradis and 2 remixes by Tim Goldsworthy and Superpitcher.

== Track listing ==
1. "Garde Le Pour Toi" (6:47)
2. "Sur Une Chanson En Français" (5:14)
3. "Le Bal Des Oubliés" (6:10)
4. "Garde Le Pour Toi" (Thee Loving Hand Mix Parts I + II) (18:49)
5. "Sur Une Chanson En Français" (Superpitcher Remix) (14:19)
