= Paradis (duo) =

French electronic dance duo

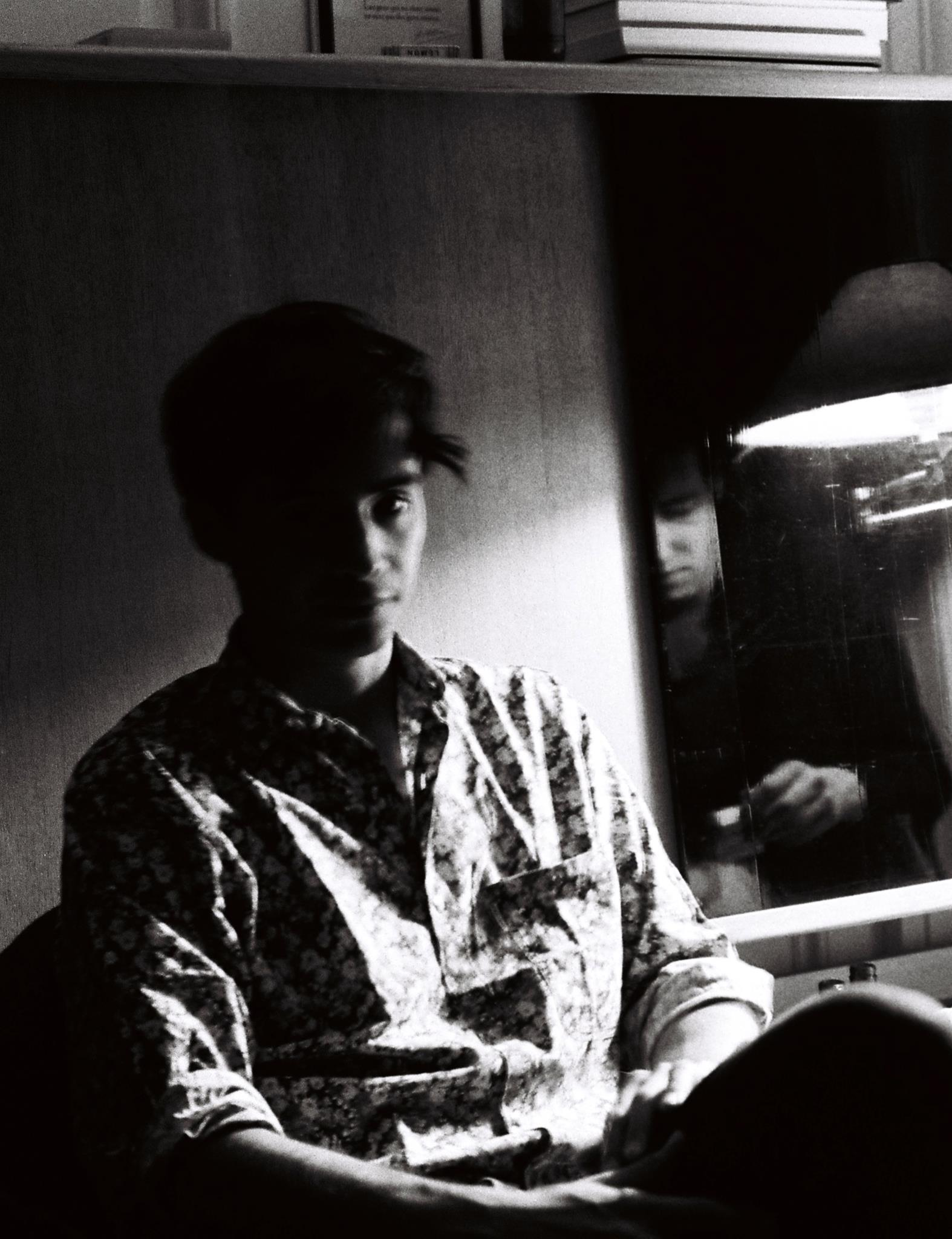
- Simon Mény (foreground) and Pierre Rousseau (reflection on right)

Background information
- Origin: Paris, France
- Genres: House; deep house; progressive house; chanson; synth-pop
- Years active: 2011–2017 (hiatus)
- Labels: Beats in Space; Barclay
- Members: Simon Mény; Pierre Rousseau

Paradis is a French electronic music duo consisting of Simon Mény and Pierre Rousseau. The duo was latest signed to Universal label Barclay. They grew to fame after releasing their first 12" single on Beats In Space titled Parfait Tirage featuring a cover of Alain Souchon's "La Ballade de Jim". The duo have appeared on the French DJ scene with sets at Nuits Sonores and Rex Club.

== Early years ==
Simon Mény and Pierre Rousseau met through friends in Paris. After realising that they had two quite different backgrounds in terms of music, they found themselves creating pieces which combine French pop with the contemporary textures of dance music.

== Career ==
=== 2011–13: Signing, soundtrack and work with APC ===
Paradis were first discovered by DJ Tim Sweeney after submitting demos to the Beats in Space radio show hoping for airplay. Sweeney eventually decided to sign the duo for the first release of his then-newly established label Beats in Space. Paradis have appeared on many mixes, some for contemporary fashion labels such as Etudes Studio and for popular music sites such as White Light Mixes.

In 2012 Paradis made the soundtrack for Sacha Barbin's short film Mes Amours Décomposé(e)s. In September of that year, Paradis collaborated with APC releasing a T-shirt as part of an APC wide collaboration with various artists. The T-shirt features a small print bird widely used by the duo as a mark of their brand alongside a print with blue accents.

=== 2014: "Garde le pour toi" ===
In anticipation of their debut album, in June 2014 Paradis released a first single entitled "Garde Le Pour Toi" via Universal label Riviera/Barclay. The song is a merge of French pop and soft house vibes with a touch of French vocals. The second single release entitled "Sur Une Chanson En Français" was released in November.

=== 2015: Couleurs Primaires EP ===
Couleurs Primaires, an EP containing three original songs was released on January 19, 2015. The EP has three main songs each uniquely attributed to a primary colour, hence the name "Couleurs Primaires" in French meaning primary colours in English. Paradis have adopted new sounds incorporating heavy elements of pop, techno and house music. Although the duo explains that finding a genre to describe their music poses a certain difficulty, the album itself is based heavily on expression and the sound that comes about by mistake. The album is then complemented by two other remix tracks composed by Tim Goldsworthy and Superpitcher. Although each track on the EP is unique, it still retains the elements of contemporary house in each of the tracks. "Primary Colours" is based on the first three tracks of their studio album, which was planned to be released in April 2016 but pushed back to September 2016.

=== 2016: Recto Verso ===
Paradis left Paris for the south of France in 2013 to work on their first album. It was originally set for sometime in spring 2015 but the release date was pushed back to give the record time to mature. The album is the first recorded by the duo and will be their second release after their new EP with French label Barclay. The album, titled Recto Verso, was released in September 2016. The album retains Paradis' core elements, merging pop music with the textures of contemporary dance music whilst adding their own melodies and synths to each track. The album contains 12 tracks. The duo confirmed that there are no collaborative appearances on the record, however the recording and mastering stages of production were aided by Julien Delfaud and Antoine Chabert affiliated with Daft Punk.

=== 2017: Hiatus and other musical projects ===
Since 2017, the duo has been on hiatus to focus on other musical projects.

In 2017, Pierre Rousseau co-produced songs for the musical project Moodoïd spearheaded by Pablo Padovani. He participated, among others, in the album Cité Champagne. In 2019, he contributed additional production on Metronomy's tracks "Salted Caramel Ice Cream" and "Lately". He also co-produced Nicolas Godin's album Concrete and Glass and worked with him on each of his tracks since 2019. He released his first mini-LP titled Musique sans paroles in 2020 and a second titled Mode par défaut in 2021.

Simon Mény, now using the name Simon Arcan, released "L'amour fou" in 2019 and appeared in 2020 on the track "Procida", featured on the eponymous album of Victor le Masne, member of Housse de Racket. In March 2026, he released "Vivre" under his original name.

== Music ==
The duo merge traditional French pop and contemporary house.

== Discography ==
=== Albums and EPs ===
Release	Year	Peak chart positions	Label
Release	Year	FRA	Label
Parfait Tirage	2011	—	Beats in Space
Hémisphère	2012	—	Beats in Space
Couleurs Primaires	2015	184	Barclay
Recto Verso	2016	30	Barclay

=== Singles ===
Single	Year	Peak chart positions	Label
Single	Year	FRA	Label
"Garde Le Pour Toi"	2014	—	Barclay
"Sur une chanson en français"	2014	—	Barclay
"Toi et moi"	2016	66	Barclay

=== Remixes ===
Paradis have featured on many 12" releases. In 2012 they remixed a song by Jacques Renault titled "Back To You" which gained popularity in the house scene. The duo have also released two other remixes of songs by Agoria and Cale Parks. In 2015 the duo remixed a song by French revelation Christine and the Queens titled "Christine". Paradis covered a popular Alain Chamfort song titled 'Rendez Vous Au Paradis' which featured on a tribute compilation of some of Chamfort's best songs released on January 22, 2016.

Jacques Renault	"Back to You (Paradis Remix)	2013	Let's Play House
Agoria featuring Scalde	"For One Hour" (Paradis Remix)	2013	Rebirth
Cale Parks	"N1" (Paradis Contours Remix)	2013	Have a Killer Time
Christine and the Queens	"Tilted" (Paradis Remix)	2015	Because
Alain Chamfort	"Paradis" (Paradis Reprise)	2016	
Flavien Berger	"Trésor" (Paradis Shuffle Mix)	2016	Pan European
