= Again (The Belair Lip Bombs album) =

Studio album by the Belair Lip Bombs
- Released: 31 October 2025
- Studios: Sound Park, Northcote, Victoria; Rolling Stock, Collingwood, Victoria; Reel 2 Real, Ballan, Victoria
- Genre: Indie rock
- Length: 33:09
- Label: Third Man
- Producers: The Belair Lip Bombs; Nao Anzai; Joe White

The Belair Lip Bombs chronology
Lush Life (2023)	Again (2025)

Singles from Again
- 1. "Hey You" Released: 13 August 2025; 2. "Don't Let Them Tell You (It's Fair)" Released: 5 September 2025; 3. "Back of My Hand" Released: 8 October 2025

Again is the second studio album by Australian indie rock band the Belair Lip Bombs. It was released on 31 October 2025, becoming the first Australian record issued by Third Man. Again also introduces drummer Daniel Devlin, who joined the band in 2024. The album was supported by three singles: "Hey You", "Don't Let Them Tell You (It's Fair)" and "Back of My Hand".

At the AIR Awards of 2026, it was nominated for Independent Album of the Year and Best Independent Rock Album or EP. At the 2026 ARIA Music Awards, it was nominated for Best Rock Album.

== Composition ==
Again is the Belair Lip Bombs' first album to be recorded alongside external producers, with previous work being self-recorded. They enlisted Nao Anzai and Joe White. The album also features Daniel Devlin on drums for the first time since joining the group, after replacing Liam de Bruin in 2024.

The album marks an expansion in the band's musical palette—they use a synth loop for the first time throughout the entirety of "Hey You".

"Don't Let Them Tell You (It's Fair)" is an empowering song about "not letting anyone walk all over you." Its lyrics were inspired by a conversation the frontwoman Maisie Everett had with fellow Melbourne musician Alex Lahey.

== Release ==
Again was released on Nashville-based label Third Man Records, after the band became its first Australian signing in August 2024, and reissued their debut album Lush Life (2023). Again's title, cover artwork and track listing was revealed on 13 August 2025, alongside the lead single "Hey You".

== Critical reception ==
Professional ratings
Review scores
Source	Rating
Clash	8/10
Dork	4/5 stars
The Line of Best Fit	7/10
NME	4/5 stars
Uncut	9/10

Again received widespread positive acclaim from music critics. It was named "Album of the Month" by British music magazine Uncut, with critic Lisa Marie-Ferla calling it Melbourne's "most striking record since Rolling Blackouts' debut [Hope Downs]," adding that the Lip Bombs "won't fly under the radar for much longer." Writing for NME, David James Young called Again a more assured release, as if the group were "auditioning to be the biggest band in the world." Likewise, Chris Connor for Clash wrote the album "easily clears the difficult second-album hurdle" and that it cements their rising status.

== Track listing ==
All tracks are written by the Belair Lip Bombs.

No.	Title	Length
1.	"Again and Again"	2:34
2.	"Don't Let Them Tell You (It's Fair)"	3:57
3.	"Another World"	2:57
4.	"Cinema"	2:51
5.	"Back of My Hand"	3:26
6.	"Hey You"	3:31
7.	"If You've Got the Time"	3:52
8.	"Smiling"	3:12
9.	"Burning Up"	4:02
10.	"Price of a Man"	4:21
Total length:		33:09

== Personnel ==
Credits adapted from Bandcamp.

- The Belair Lip Bombs (Mike Bradvica, Daniel Devlin, James Droughton and Maisie Everett) – songwriting, co-producers
- Nao Anzai – co-producer, recording, mixing; Hammond organ (track 2), synthesiser (track 6)
- Joe White – co-producer
- Joe Carra – mastering
- Kathleen Mear – violin (tracks 1, 4, 9)

== Charts ==
Chart performance for Again
Chart (2025)	Peak position
Australian Albums (ARIA)	25
UK Album Downloads (Official Charts)	69
UK Independent Albums (Official Charts)	35
UK Record Store (OCC)	39
