= Garde Le Pour Toi =

Single by Paradis

from the album Couleurs Primaires
- Released: June 11, 2014
- Genre: House
- Length: 6:47
- Label: Barclay
- Songwriter(s): Simon Mény; Pierre Rousseau; Brigitte Fontaine; Areski Belkacem
- Producer(s): Paradis

Paradis singles chronology
"Garde Le Pour Toi" (2014)	"Sur une chanson en français" (2014)

"Garde Le Pour Toi" ("Keep It to Yourself") is the first single released by Parisian duo Paradis and is the debut release by Paradis via Barclay. Merging elements of house and pop, the song focuses heavily on a techno bassline fusing pop song melodies. After being published online on June 11, 2014, the song was an instant hit with over half a million plays on SoundCloud alone.

== Music video ==
The music video produced by director Daniel Brereton focuses on the natural environment, a creative and well known aspect of the London-based director's work.

== Production ==
The song was produced by Simon Mény and Pierre Rousseau at Studio Clavel in Paris and mixed by Julien Delfaud.
