= Simona Castricum =

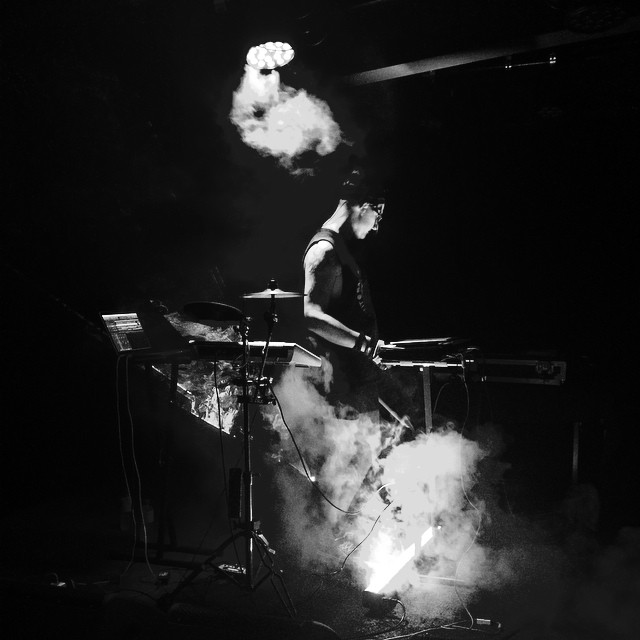
- Playing live, February 2015

Background information
- Also known as: Fluorescent; Simona Kapitolina
- Born: Melbourne, Victoria, Australia
- Genres: Underground pop; techno pop; new beat; electronic
- Occupations: Musician; DJ; academic; broadcaster
- Instruments: Vocals; drums; keyboards; guitar
- Years active: 1997–present
- Labels: Refectory5; Girls Who Smoke Poke; Listen Records; Trans-Brunswick Express
- Website: simonacastricum.com

Simona Castricum is an Australian musician, DJ, broadcaster and architecture academic.

== Early years and education ==
Simona Castricum was born in Dandenong and grew up in the Mornington Peninsula area to attend local primary and secondary schools.

She cited her first music role model as disco performer Sylvester.

== Architecture ==
Graduating from RMIT University with a Bachelor of Architecture (Hons) in 2001, Castricum has worked in exhibition design, architecture, and graphic design, notably with the Jewish Museum of Australia, for Melbourne design firms Tom Kovac and ARM Architecture. Castricum began her PhD candidature in architecture at the Melbourne School of Design, University of Melbourne. Her creative and intellectual research practise explores how gender nonconforming, transgender and queer experiences and identity exist in architectural space and professional design practises. She has presented her work 'When Program is The Enemy of Function...' at the 13th International AHRA Conference 'Architecture & Feminisms' at the KTH Royal Institute of Technology in Stockholm, Sweden and at 'Queering Architecture' for 2017's Melbourne Design Week at the National Gallery of Victoria International. In 2019, Castricum was a festival ambassador for 2019 Melbourne Knowledge Week.

== Music ==
Castricum started her music career as a DJ in the late 1990s playing in queer clubs in Melbourne. Castricum has cited artists, Depeche Mode, New Order, My Bloody Valentine, Curve and both Detroit techno and Belgian New Beat genres as influences. She has stated her biographical song writing is influenced by articulating ideas about architecture and gender nonconformity, citing cinema soundtrack artists Vangelis and Wendy Carlos as influences on her life and identity as a gender nonconforming transgender woman.

In 2002, under the name Fluorescent, Castricum began recording her debut album, Post Nuclear, which was released in 2005. In 2008, she released Winter, working with guest musicians including Melbourne DJ Viva L’amour on vocals. Fluorescent’s live line-up had several members over the years, with the band performing shows supporting Midnight Juggernauts, Cut Copy and Ladytron. In 2010, Castricum formed the band Ana Nicole with Melissa D’or, Masato Takasaka and Jacqui Moore.

Their 2012 debut release Twinkie is described by Chris Girdler of Beat as "doom-laden music… (luring) the listener into a cold, cruel world of cheating, scheming and excess". During this time, Castricum ran a club night, The Shock of the New at The Order of Melbourne, Gasometer and Liberty Social.

In 2013, she began performing as a solo artist under her name Simona Castricum releasing her debut album Exotic Ladies Of Birobidzhan on her own label Girls Who Smoke Poke. Her follow up #triggerwarning40 was released on Listen Records, described by Rei Barker at the Interns as "pointedly different from previous efforts, stylistically diving deep into techno-pop with gorgeous, almost-disco synth lines and assertive, expertly-programmed drums".

Castricum’s third studio album, 2020’s Panic/Desire, was released on her own label Trans-Brunswick Express. The album was Castricum’s breakthrough release, debuting at number 1 on the AIR 100% Independent Albums Chart in June 2021, with the album nominated for the 2020 Australian Music Prize longlist. Panic/Desire was rated with 4 stars by themusic.com, described by reviewer Cyclone Wehner as "ultimately emotionally transportive…, inclusive art for now and the future".

Sara Savage of i-D has written Castricum presents "a kind of cathartic club music that's reflective of her live show — which often induces audiences into a pulsating dancefloor".

Her live show at Golden Plains Festival in March 2020 was described by Karen Leng of Double J as, "a minimal set up of electronic drums and guitar... their big banging techno meets synth pop sound brought the crowd to its feet."

In 2017, Castricum formed the duo SaD with collaborator Daphne Camf (of NO ZU, Rat Vs Possum and GAY). In 2018, they released their debut single "The Poets of Antiquity", followed by "Don’t Go" in 2019 and "Sign From Above" in 2020.

In September that year, SaD released their debut album Saturn Rules the Material World, which was described as "a considered and layered work that showcases the width and breadth of the darkwave electro genre, a masterclass in thought and execution". It would be SaD’s only full length album, with Daphne Camf’s death in April 2021.

Castricum is also a part-time radio broadcaster and DJ on Melbourne community radio station 3RRR FM.

== Writing and advocacy ==
Simona Castricum, has contributed articles to publications Vice Magazine, i-D and Thump, writing on visibility and access for queer and transgender performers. She had personal memoirs published in The Guardian, The Huffington Post and Archer Magazine.

Her short non-fiction and critique writing on sexuality, gender and architecture have appeared in print in The Lifted Brow, Mongrel Rapture: The Architecture of Ashton Raggatt McDougall From the Heart: Women Of Letters and Doing It: Women Tell the Truth About Great Sex.

Simona is an advocate for safer spaces and inclusivity of queer and gender diverse artists. She has appeared at Australian music conferences BIGSOUND and LISTEN as a moderator and panellist advocating for greater representation and equity in music and performance for gender nonconforming artists.

== Discography ==
=== Studio albums ===
| Title | Album details |
|---|---|
| Post Nuclear (as Fluorescent) | Released: 26 October 2005 Refectory5; Format: CD, download; Label: Refectory5 (r5cd 002) |
| Winter (as Fluorescent) | Released: 2008; Format: CD, download; Label: r Records (r004) |
| Twinkie (as Ana Nicole) | Released: 2012; Format: CD, download; Label: Girls Who Smoke Poke (GWSP-1209-003) |
| Trouble in Utopia | Released: 13 September 2013; Format: CD, download, streaming; Label: Girls Who Smoke Poke (GWSP-130914) |
| Exotic Ladies of Birobidzhan | Released: 15 July 2014; Format: CD, download, streaming; Label: Girls Who Smoke Poke (GWSP-140701) |
| #TriggerWarning40 | Released: July 2016; Format: Limited to 250 LP, CD, download, streaming; Label: LISTEN Records (LR0005) |
| Panic/Desire | Released: June 2020; Format: Limited to 300 LP, CD, download, streaming; Label: T-BE (T-BE 200601) |
| Sink | Released: July 2023; Format: download, streaming; Label: Dinosaur City Records |
| Villain | |

== Awards and nominations ==
=== AIR Awards ===
The Australian Independent Record Awards (commonly known informally as AIR Awards) is an annual awards night to recognise, promote and celebrate the success of Australia's Independent Music sector.

| Year | Nominee / work | Award | Result | Ref. |
|---|---|---|---|---|
| 2024 | Sink | Best Independent Dance or Electronica Album or EP | Nominated | |

=== Music Victoria Awards ===
The Music Victoria Awards, are an annual awards night celebrating Victorian music. They commenced in 2005.

| Year | Nominee / work | Award | Result | Ref. |
|---|---|---|---|---|
| 2020 | herself | Best Solo Act | Nominated | |
| 2020 | herself | Best Electronic Act | Nominated | |
| 2021 | SaD | Best Electronic Act | Nominated | |
| 2024 | Simona Castricum | Best Solo Artist | Nominated | |
| 2024 | Simona Castricum | Best Electronic Artist | Nominated | |
