= D Line =

D Line may refer to:

== Transportation ==
=== United States ===
- D (Los Angeles Railway), a former streetcar line in Los Angeles, California
- D (New York City Subway service), a subway route in New York
- D (SEPTA Metro), a trolley line in Delaware County, Pennsylvania
- D Line (Los Angeles Metro), a rapid transit line in Los Angeles County, California
- D Line (RTD), a light rail line in Denver
- Green Line D branch, a light rail line in Boston, Massachusetts
- Metro D Line (Minnesota), a bus rapid transit line in Minneapolis, Minnesota
- RapidRide D Line, a bus route in Seattle, Washington

=== Europe ===
- Line D (Prague Metro), a subway route under construction in Prague, the Czech Republic
- Line D (Rome Metro), potential line of the Rome Metro system
- D Line (Paris), one of the RER five lines serving Paris and its suburbs

=== Argentina ===
- Line D (Buenos Aires Underground), an underground line in Buenos Aires, Argentina

== Other uses ==
- Defensive line, commonly referred to as D-line, a formation in gridiron football
- D-line, Port Harcourt, a neighborhood in Port Harcourt, Nigeria
- D-line (IRC), a command in IRCd
- D-line, a spectral line of the Fraunhofer lines

== See also ==
- D Train (disambiguation)
- Eth, a Latin-script letter represented by Ð
