= Music Victoria Awards of 2015 =

Annual Australian music awards ceremony

- Date: 11 November 2015
- Venue: 170 Russell, Melbourne, Victoria
- Hosted by: Chris Gill and Lyndelle Wilkinson

Highlights
- Most wins: Courtney Barnett (4)

The Music Victoria Awards of 2015 are the tenth Annual Music Victoria Awards and consist of a series of awards, culminating in an awards ceremony on 11 November 2015.

For the first time, the public awards and the genre specific awards, were all presented in one event.

Immediately following the awards ceremony, Music Victoria CEO Patrick Donovan congratulated all of the nominees and winners saying, "Bringing the genre awards and public awards together was a great success as the nominees are all equally deserving. It was wonderful to see the stars of the music industry under one roof in a huge celebration that showcases the depth of our diverse music scene."

== Hall of Fame inductees ==
- John Farnham, AC/DC, Olivia Newton-John, Archie Roach, Palais Theatre, Sunbury Festival, The Seekers, Thunderbirds, Stan Rofe, Bill Armstrong

== Award nominees and winners ==
=== All genre Awards ===
Public voted awards. Winners indicated in boldface, with other nominees in plain.

| Best Album | Best Song |
|---|---|
| **Courtney Barnett - Sometimes I Sit and Think, and Sometimes I Just Sit**; Dick Diver - Melbourne, Florida; Dorsal Fins - Mind Renovation; Ben Salter - The Stars My Destination; Totally Mild - Down Time | **Courtney Barnett - "Depreston"**; Courtney Barnett - "Pedestrian at Best"; Pearls - "Big Shot"; Jess Ribeiro – "Hurry Back to Love"; The Peep Tempel - "Carol" |
| Best Male | Best Female |
| **CW Stoneking**; Briggs; Fraser A. Gorman; Tom Iansek; Marlon Williams | **Courtney Barnett**; Mojo Juju; Jess Ribeiro; Ella Thompson; Sui Zhen |
| Best Band | Best Emerging Artist |
| **Courtney Barnett**; King Gizzard and the Lizard Wizard; The Peep Tempel; Totally Mild; Twerps | **Raised By Eagles**; Gold Class; Harts; Total Giovanni; Totally Mild |
| Best Live Band | Best Venue |
| **The Smith Street Band**; The Bamboos; The Drones; The Peep Tempel; Total Giovanni | **The Corner Hotel, Richmond**; Howler, Brunswick; Shebeen, Melbourne; The Gasometer Hotel, Collingwood; The Tote, Collingwood |
| Best Regional Venue | Best Regional Act |
| **Theatre Royal, Castlemaine**; Barwon Club, Geelong; Karova Lounge, Ballarat; Meeniyan Town Hall, Meeniyan; The Loft, Warrnambool | **Cosmic Psychos**; Briggs; Crepes; D.D Dumbo; The Murlocs |
| Best Festival | |
| **Golden Plains Festival**; Boogie; St Jerome's Laneway Festival; Sugar Mountain; Supersense | |

=== Genre Specific Awards ===
Industry expert panel awards

| Best Blues Album | Best Country Album |
|---|---|
| **Fiona Boyes – Box & Dice**; Blue Heat - One Day Too Long; Blues Mountain - Separation Street; Greg Dodd & The Hoodoo Men - Movin' On; Lloyd Spiegel - Double Live Set | **Raised By Eagles - Diamonds inhe Bloodstream**; Jemma & The Clifton Hillbillies - Jemma & The Clifton Hillbillies; Ben Mastwyk - Mornin', Evenin'; Mustered Courage - White Lies & Melodies; Marlon Williams - Marlon Williams |
| Best Soul, Funk, R'n'B and Gospel Album | Best Jazz Album |
| **Emma Donovan & The Putbacks – Dawn**; Mojo Juju - Seeing Red / Feeling Blue; Paul Kelly - The Merri Soul Sessions; The Seven Ups - The Seven Ups; Women of Soul - Women of Soul | **Barney McAll – Mooroolbark**; Allan Browne Quintet – Ithaca Bound; Jack Earle Big Band – Jack Earle Big Band; Refraction – As We Were; Paul Van Ross – Mi Alma Cuban: My Cuban Soul |
| Best Hip Hop Album | Best Electronic Act |
| **Maundz - Nobody's Business**; Ciecmate – Limbo; Tornts - No Compromise; Spit & Mac - The Hourglass; Lgeez - Cloud Nine | **Roland Tings**; Andras & Oscar; I'lls; Total Giovanni; Wabz |
| Best Heavy Album | Best Indigenous Act |
| **High Tension – Bully**; Cuntz - Force the Zone; Fuck the Fitzroy Doom Scene - Facing the Ruin; King Parrot - Dead Set; Ne Obliviscaris - Citadel | **Emma Donovan**; Briggs; Philly; Dan Sultan; Benny Walker |
| Best Global or Reggae Album | Best Experimental/Avant-Garde Act |
| **Quarter Street - Quarter Street**; Ras Jahknow - Jah Sta Li Dub; Larry Maluma - Ulemu; Ruth Roshan & Tango Noir - Stories of Love & Regret; T Rhythm - Reminicin | **Carolyn Connors**; Eves; Robin Fox; Joe Talia; Eugene Ughetti |
| Best Folk Roots Album | |
| **Tolka - Our House**; Kate Burke & Ruth Hazleton - Declaration; Suzanna Espie - Mother's Not Feeling Herself Today; Oh Pep! - Living; The Mae Trio - September | |
