= Tim Sweeney (DJ) =

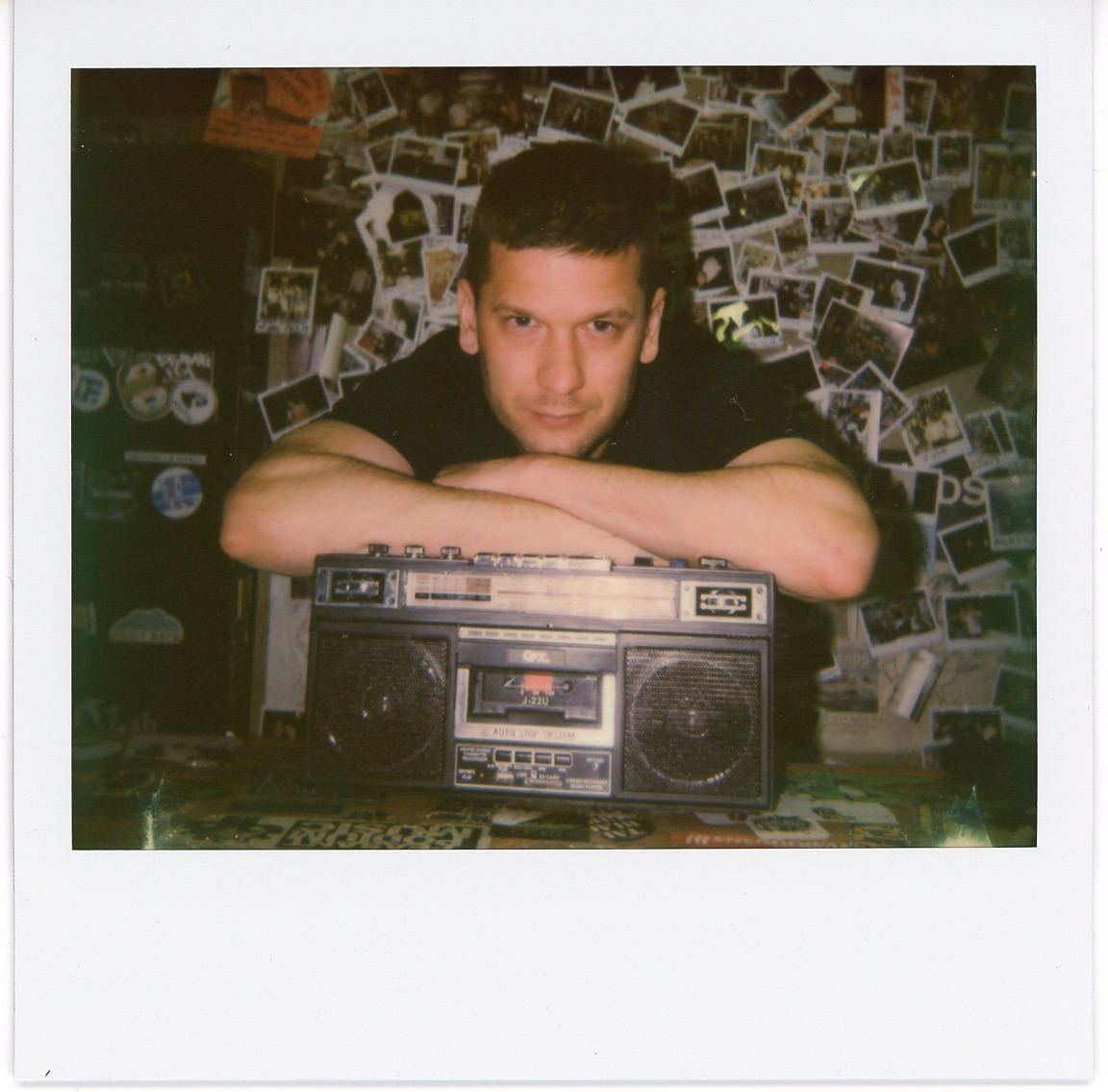
- Tim Sweeney hosts Beats in Space
- Other names: T&P (with Philipp Lauer), T&T (with Tim Goldsworthy)
- Occupation: Radio host / DJ
- Known for: Beats in Space

Tim Sweeney is an American radio host, DJ, and producer, known for his long-running show on WNYU-FM and Apple Music, Beats in Space. Sweeney also runs an independent label under the Beats in Space moniker.

== Career ==
Sweeney’s show, Beats in Space, first aired on WNYU in the Fall of 1999, while Sweeney was a freshman at NYU. The show gained traction after he hosted many high-profile DJs and producers in the early 2000s, including James Murphy, DJ Harvey, Carl Craig, Diplo, The Avalanches, and Hot Chip, among others.

Since 2003, Sweeney has also been heavily involved with many DFA releases and fellow Brooklyn-based label RVNG.

=== Beats in Space (Radio Show) ===
Beats in Space was a radio show mixed live by Tim Sweeney and guests, and it aired every Tuesday night from 10:30pm to 1:00am on WNYU-FM. On March 9, 2021, Sweeney announced on-air that the show would be his last on WNYU after 21 years, and that he would be taking a break from broadcasting.

On November 1, 2021, Beats in Space relaunched on Apple Music 1. Each week features an hour-long mix from Sweeney and an hour-long mix from a guest. Sweeney cited listener accessibility and recording flexibility as the primary reasons for the shift to a digital format.

=== Beats in Space Records ===
In 2011, Sweeney launched his own label, Beats in Space, with the release of the single “Parfait Tirage b/w La Ballade de Jim” by French duo, Paradis. The label has had a steady output of releases, the most recent one being “Dawning Light” by Jacques Bon (2017). Other critically acclaimed releases include Jee Day’s “Sum of Love”, Tornado Wallace’s “Desperate Pleasures” and Secret Circuit’s “Tactile Galactics”. Sweeney also released a thirty-track CD compilation in 2014, “Beats in Space 15th Anniversary.”

Beats in Space List of Releases
Artist	Title
Paradis	Parfait Tirage b/w La Ballade de Jim (Single)
Secret Circuit	Nebula Sphynx
Paradis	Hémisphère b/w Je M'Ennuie
Lauer	Macsat Ring Down
Secret Circuit	Afterlife
Secret Circuit	Tactile Galactics
Jee Day	Sum of Love
Tornado Wallace	Desperate Pleasures
Gonno	The Noughties
Crystal & S. Koshi	Break the Dawn
Dukes of Chutney	Domino (EP)
Hidden Fees	So What (EP)
House of Spirits	Holding On
Matt Karmil	So You Say
Jaakko Eino Kalevi	Yin Yang Theatre
Guido w/ Georges Perin	Gin 'n' Tears
Lauer	Hands & Feet
Tim Sweeney	Beats in Space 15th Anniversary Mix (Sampler)
Tim Sweeney	Beats in Space 15th Anniversary Mix
Tornado Wallace	Kangaroo Ground / Ferntree Gully
Palmbomen II	Palmbomen II
T&P	Shoot the Freak
Various	BIS 001-020
Antenna	Primavera
Mount Liberation Unlimited	(Eerie) For Your Love
Shan	Good To Me
Palmbomen II	Memories of Cindy
Jacques Bon	Dawning Light

=== Other Credits ===
Sweeney worked as a soundtrack supervisor at Rockstar Games from 2003 to 2006 for games including GTA: San Andreas, GTA: Liberty City Stories, The Warriors, and Midnight Club 3.
