= Parfait Tirage =

Single by Paradis
- A-side: "Parfait Tirage"
- B-side: "La Ballade de Jim"
- Released: September 20, 2011
- Genre: House
- Label: Beats In Space

Paradis singles chronology
"Parfait Tirage" (2011)	"'Hemisphere'" (2012)

"Parfait Tirage" was the 2011 debut 12" release by Parisian duo Paradis and the first release for Tim Sweeney's Beats In Space Records. The 12" features both an (a) side and (b) side. On side (a) "Parfait Tirage" and side (b) "La Ballade de Jim". The side (b) track, "La Ballade de Jim", is a cover by Paradis of French singer Alain Souchon's song of the same name. Both tracks feature a unique merge of electronic house and traditional French pop music.

== Cover art ==
The cover art was designed by Bjorn Copeland, a collagist and member of NYC experimental music legends Black Dice.
