= High Pass Filter =

- Origin: Melbourne, Victoria, Australia
- Genres: Dub, rock, electronic, experimental
- Years active: 1995–2006
- Past members: Ben Green; Brian May; Anthony Paine; Kelly Ryall; James Wilkinson; Larry de Zoete

High Pass Filter were a live electro-dub band formed in Melbourne, Australia. The band was active from 1995–2006 and supported many major touring artists such as Beastie Boys, Blues Explosion, Tortoise, Fugazi, Lee 'Scratch' Perry, The Boredoms and Mad Professor.

The group began as a live dub outfit playing local clubs and bars around Melbourne's Fitzroy area. They quickly became known for their experimental sound and mostly instrumental songs. Live concerts regularly involved the use of unconventional instruments such as looped tape machines, conch shells, telephone receivers, air tubes and a variety of toys. During early shows, guitarist Kelly Ryall regularly played one of the infamous Travis Bean aluminium neck guitars - a TB1000 owned by bassist Anthony Paine. High Pass Filter played the 'Hot House' stage at the Sydney leg of the Big Day Out Festival in 2000. Two of their songs were broadcast from the festival on local radio station Triple J. The band also played several live sessions for the ABC's Radio National public radio service.

Many of the band members have since gone on to form or collaborate with a variety of acts including One Watt Sun, The Hired Guns, Beam Up, Leather Pet, Legends of Motorsport, The Snuff Puppets, Snout, and Will Guthrie.

Electronicist Brian May is currently running 3 aliases (Beam Up, DJ Delay, Sonical,) and creates sound installations for visual artists such as John Aslanidis Guitarist Kelly Ryall composes music for theatre, film, dance and performance with, amongst other collaborators, the Melbourne Theatre Company. Bass player Anthony Paine can be found building and repairing guitars under the name Harvester Guitars as well as continuing to be involved with bands. Notably, Black Cab who were nominated for the Australian Music Prize in 2009.

The band appeared at The Punters Club Reunion Show on 3rd July 2022

== Members ==
- Ben Green (Turntables, vocals)
- Brian May (Synths, samples, loops, trumpet, percussion)
- Anthony Paine (Bass, toys, tape-loops)
- James Wilkinson (Trombone, toys)
- Kelly Ryall (Guitar)
- Larry de Zoete (Drums)

== Discography ==
=== 7" Singles ===
- "ESN" / "Scrubbed" (1996)

=== EPs ===
- Talkin' 'bout Yeah (rehearsal tapes and live recordings) (2000)
- What's In The Bag? (remixes) (2001)

=== Albums ===
- Audio Forensic (1997)
- A Trillion Dollars (remixes) (1998)
- Soft Adventure (2004)

=== Songs on compilations ===
- "E.S.N." (Fathom: Antipodean Beats, 1997)
- "No Standing" (A Minute Or Less: 78 Bands - 78 Songs, 1997)
- "Skint" (3RRR radio compilation, 1999)
- "Cruel But Stupid (live) (We Are Now Flying @ 10.000 Feet (A Sensory Compilation), 1999)
- "N.C.O." (The Empress Celebrates 15 Years compilation, 2002)
- "Cassowary" (West Papua - 'Sound of the Morning Star', 2003)
