= Suldusk =

Australian band

- Origin: Melbourne, Australia
- Genres: Neofolk; black metal; blackgaze
- Years active: 2016–present
- Labels: Northern Silence Productions; Napalm Records
- Members: Emily Highfield; Zebadee Scott; Shane Mulholland; Josh Taylor; Daniel Green; Hayley Anderson
- Past members: Frankie Demuru (2019-2023)

Suldusk is an Australian neofolk and black metal band from Melbourne. The band was formed in 2016 by Emily Highfield as a one-woman project, later growing to five members. They are currently signed to Napalm Records. Since its formation, the band has released two studio albums and one EP.

== History ==
Highfield established Suldusk in 2016. In 2017 she released the debut EP "To A Vestige Of Purest Light". Suldusk's debut studio album, entitled "Lunar Falls", was released on 12 April 2019 through the label Northern Silence Productions, receiving positive reviews. After the release of Lunar Falls, Highfield expanded Suldusk from a one-woman band into a quintet. On 4 October 2023, it was announced that Suldusk had signed with Napalm Records. Their second studio album, "Anthesis", was released with this label on 1 March 2024 to positive reviews.

== Discography ==
=== Studio albums ===
List of studio albums
Title	Details
Lunar Falls	Released: 12 April 2019; Label: Northern Silence Productions; Format: CD, LP, digital download, streaming
Anthesis	Released: 1 March 2024; Label: Napalm Records; Format: CD, LP, digital download, streaming

=== Extended plays ===
List of extended plays
Title	Details
To A Vestige Of Purest Light	Released: 19 December 2017; Label: Self-released; Format: Digital download, streaming

== Awards and nominations ==
=== Music Victoria Awards ===
The Music Victoria Awards, are an annual awards night celebrating Victorian music. They commenced in 2005 (although nominee and winners are unknown from 2005 to 2012).

Year	Nominee / work	Award	Result
2019	Lunar Falls	Best Heavy Album	Won
2024	Suldusk	Best Heavy Work	Nominated
