= Barbariön =

Australian band

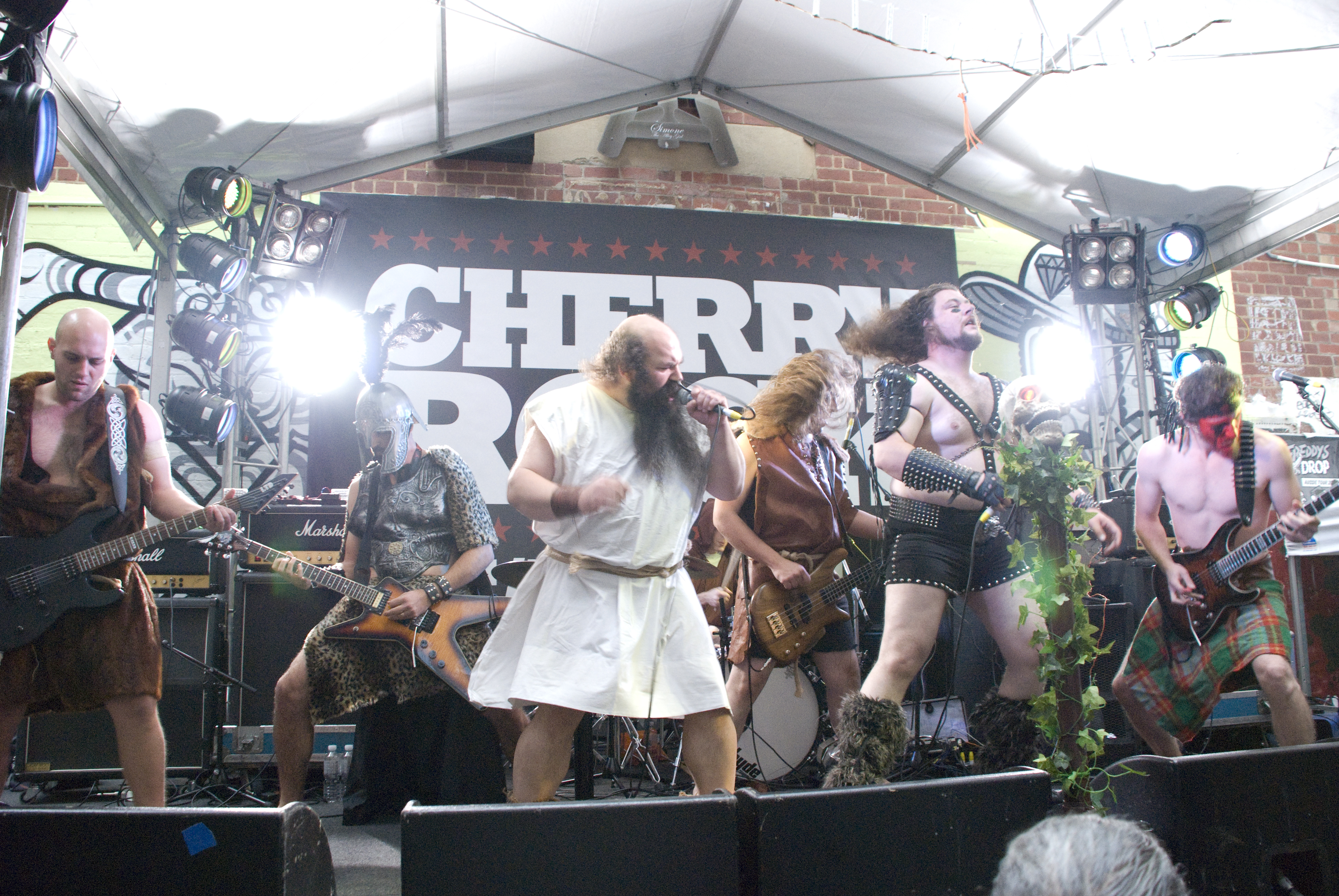
Barbariön live at Cherry Rock. L to R: Hugh Kendall, Chris Garcia, Frankie Gionfriddo, Richard Kelly(bachground), Yuri Pavlinov, Myles Tauchert, Chris Evans

Barbariön is an Australian band formed in the winter of 2007 by Myles Tauchert. Their music, categorised as 'classic' heavy metal, and a persona of 'barbarians of the world', combine for a theatrical stage show.

== History ==
Barbariön's live performances began in 2008, at Sublime Studios (Brunswick, Victoria) and continued throughout Melbourne, including shows at The Tote and the Melbourne Fringe Festival. Their first album, Feast On The Beast, was released 21 June 2009 (winter solstice), at Back In The Day (Melbourne CBD), receiving mixed reviews. In 2010, Barbariön opened at Cherry Bar's "Cherry Rock 2010" music festival, and released their first EP AAAAARRGGHHH on 20 November at the East Brunswick Club Hotel Brunswick East, Victoria.

In 2011 Barbariön performed on the festival circuit, starting with Big Day Out Festival, then Rock By The Bay Festival, Boogie Festival, River Rocks and finally The Meredith Music Festival. The band released their first official music video, My Rock in April, and also performed at The Esplanade Hotel, The Palace Theatre, also supporting Andrew W.K. at the HiFi Bar, and in 2012 The Beards at The Corner Hotel.

The band was featured on the ABC television series Spicks and Specks.

In 2013 the band went on a tour of Europe, playing at festivals and other venues after winning a Facebook contest. They also released the CD Ram the World.

== Band members ==
=== Current ===
- Chris Evans - guitar / gass / vocals (2007 – present)
- Chris Garcia - guitar (2007 – present)
- Richard Kelly - drums / percussion (2007 – present)
- Hugh Kendall - guitar (2007 – present)
- Yuri Pavlinov - bass (2007 – present)
- Myles Tauchert - vocals (2007 – present)

=== Previous ===
- Frankie Gionfriddo - vocals (2007 – 2014)

== Discography ==
- Feast On The Beast (2009)
- AAAAARRGGHHH (2010)
- Ram The World (2013)
