= D Train =

D Train or D-Train may refer to:

== Entertainment ==
- The D Train, a 2015 American film
- D Train (music group),1980–1985 R&B duo
  - D. Train (album), 1982
- James D-Train Williams (born 1962), American singer

== Transportation ==
=== Europe ===
- D Train (Paris), a train on the D Line, one of the RER five lines serving Paris and its suburbs
- D-Zug, a type of express train service in Germany, Austria, and Switzerland

=== United States ===
- D (New York City Subway service), New York City
- Green Line D branch, Greater Boston
- D Line (Los Angeles Metro), a rapid transit line in Los Angeles County, California

=== Others ===
- Vivarail D-Train, a family of multiple unit trains built by Vivarail for the British rail network

== Other uses ==
- Dontrelle Willis or "The D-Train" (born 1982), American baseball player

== See also ==
- 4D (train), a prototype double deck electric train, Victoria, Australia
- D Line (disambiguation)
- D Stock, London Underground
