= The Belair Lip Bombs =

Australian indie rock band

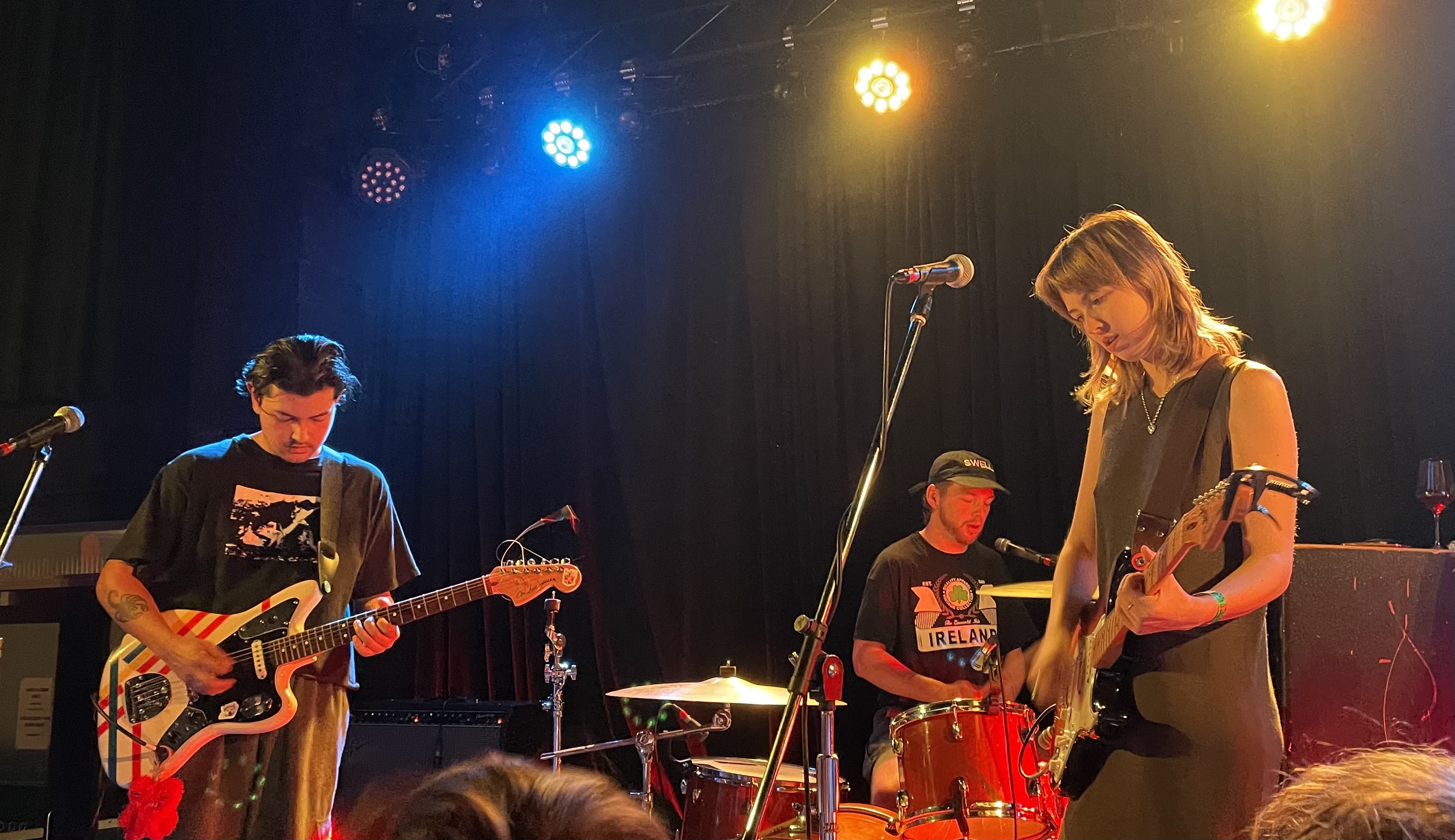
- From left: Mike Bradvica, Daniel Devlin and Maisie Everett performing at La La La's, Wollongong, in August 2024.

Background information
- Origin: Frankston, Victoria, Australia
- Genres: Indie rock; surf punk
- Years active: 2017–present
- Labels: Cousin Will; Third Man
- Members: Maisie Everett; Mike Bradvica; Jimmy Droughton; Daniel Devlin
- Past members: Liam de Bruin
- Website: thebelairlipbombs.com

The Belair Lip Bombs are an Australian indie rock band formed in Frankston, Victoria in 2017. The group consists of lead vocalist, guitarist and keyboardist Maisie Everett, guitarist Mike Bradvica, bassist Jimmy Droughton and drummer Daniel Devlin. They have released two extended plays and issued their debut studio album, Lush Life, in August 2023. After becoming the first Australian act to sign with Third Man Records, they released their second album, Again, in October 2025.

== History ==
The Belair Lip Bombs formed in Frankston, Victoria in 2017, with all four members playing music since a young age and meeting in high school. The band is named after a set of skateboard wheels from the 1980s. They released their self-titled debut extended play (EP) in 2018, and a second, titled Songs to Do Your Laundry To, in May 2019. Lead vocalist Maisie Everett used to play bass guitar in Melbourne punk outfit Clamm before departing at the start of 2023 to focus on the Lip Bombs.

The group released their debut studio album, Lush Life, in August 2023 via Melbourne-based independent label Cousin Will Records. Writing for NME, Doug Wallen called it a genre-defying record, with elements of "punk, post-punk, jangle pop and new wave". Original drummer Liam de Bruin left the Lip Bombs after the album's release, and was replaced by Daniel Devlin in late 2024, who was involved in the Melbourne bands Delivery and Polly and the Pockets.

The Lip Bombs played at South by Southwest in Austin, Texas in March 2024, and in August, they became the first Australian act to sign with Nashville-based label Third Man Records, who issued a re-release of Lush Life. In November, they were nominated for Unearthed Artist of the Year in the 2024 J Awards.

The band opened for Spacey Jane on a 25-date tour across North America through September and October 2025. The Lip Bombs released their second studio album, Again, on 31 October 2025, supported by three singles including "Hey You". Music critics were favourable towards the band's expanded musical palette and predicted their imminent breakout.

The Lip Bombs started their first North American tour in March 2026 after playing 57 concerts in 2025. They performed songs from Again on NPR's WXPN World Cafe on May 21, 2026. The band performed songs from Again and Lush Life on Seattle radio station KEXP on May 26, 2026.

Later that year, they embarked on a European tour and then another tour of North America, with Armlock supporting them on the latter. Unfortunately, a few of their shows, including a show in Canada, were cancelled after their tour bus was raided by vandals, stealing some of their gear. They will finish 2026 with a 3 show Australian tour, starting at the Forum in Melbourne on November 7, with Hockey Dad's Zach Stephenson, Public Figures and Indigo King supporting.

== Artistry ==
Speaking of the band's influences, Everett said "there's not that one band or one era of music that [they] all like and really connect over", and that they are never striving to fit into a specific sound. She writes most of their songs, and the three other members flesh out the music during rehearsals. Writing for The Guardian, Shaad D'Souza described Everett's vocals on Lush Life as having a "louche, swaggering tone" delivering "headrush romantic narratives that match the frenetic pace and intensity of the songs themselves." He compared the band's style to that of the Strokes.

== Discography ==
=== Studio albums ===
List of albums, with selected details
Title	Details	Peak chart positions
Title	Details	AUS
Lush Life	Released: 25 August 2023; Formats: LP, digital; Label: Cousin Will (CWR013)	—
Again	Released: 31 October 2025; Formats: LP, CD, digital; Label: Third Man (TMR1038CD)	25

=== Extended plays ===
List of EPs, with selected details
Title	Details
The Belair Lip Bombs	Released: 13 November 2018; Formats: CD, digital; Label: Self-released
Songs to Do Your Laundry To	Released: 21 May 2019; Format: Digital; Label: Self-released

== Awards and nominations ==
=== AIR Awards ===
The Australian Independent Record Awards (commonly known informally as AIR Awards) is an annual awards night to recognise, promote and celebrate the success of Australia's Independent Music sector.

Year	Nominee / work	Award	Result	Ref.
2026	Again	Independent Album of the Year	Nominated	
2026	Again	Best Independent Rock Album or EP	Nominated	

=== APRA Awards ===
The APRA Awards are presented annually from 1982 by the Australasian Performing Right Association (APRA), "honouring composers and songwriters". They commenced in 1982.

Year	Nominee / work	Award	Result	Ref.
2026	"Hey You" (Michael Bradvica / Daniel Devlin / James Droughton / Maisie Everett)	Song of the Year	Shortlisted	

=== ARIA Music Awards ===
The ARIA Music Awards is an annual awards ceremony that recognises excellence, innovation, and achievement across all genres of Australian music.

Year	Nominee / work	Award	Result	Ref.
2026	Again	Best Rock Album	Nominated	

=== J Awards ===
The J Awards are an annual series of Australian music awards that were established by the Australian Broadcasting Corporation's youth-focused radio station Triple J. They commenced in 2005.

Year	Nominee / work	Award	Result	Ref.
2024	The Belair Lip Bombs	Unearthed Artist of the Year	Nominated	

=== Music Victoria Awards ===
The Music Victoria Awards are an annual awards night celebrating Victorian music. They commenced in 2006.

Year	Nominee / work	Award	Result	Ref.
2024	Lush Life	Best Album	Nominated	
2024	The Belair Lip Bombs	Best Rock/Punk Work	Won	
