= Ground Components =

Australian rock band

- Origin: Melbourne, Victoria, Australia
- Genres: Punk rock, soul
- Years active: 2002–2007
- Label: Shock
- Past members: Indra Adams; Joe McGuigan; Simon McGuigan; Dallas Paxton; Robert Bravington
- Website: www.groundcomponents.com

Ground Components were an Australian soul and punk rock band. Formed December 2002 by Indra Adams on bass guitar, Joe McGuigan on lead vocals and guitar, Simon McGuigan on drums and Dallas Paxton on keyboards. Their debut album, An Eye for a Brow, a Tooth for a Pick (September 2006), reached the ARIA Albums Chart. They disbanded in 2007.

== History ==
Ground Components were formed in the Melbourne suburb of East Brunswick in December 2002 by Indra Adams on bass guitar, Joe McGuigan on lead vocals and guitar, Simon McGuigan on drums and Dallas Paxton on keyboards. Their first public performances were in that year, playing alongside friends' bands and at house parties. They signed with local independent record label, Love&Mercy, in the following year.

They performed at Meredith Music Festival, Big Day Out, Splendour in the Grass and Homebake. And played as support band for The Black Keys, Hard Fi, Teenage Fanclub, Saul Williams, Spoon, My Morning Jacket, Muse band, M Ward, Microphones, J Mascis, The Liars, Suicide Girls, The Sleepy Jackson, Spiderbait, Powderfinger. Before touring United States and playing SXSW festival, and the UK in 2004.

Ground Components collaborated with Melbourne-based female MC Macromantics (Kill Rock Stars, US). And played as backing band to both Microphones and M Ward. Adams and Paxton also played horns for My Morning Jacket on their most recent tour of Australia. Their debut album, An Eye for a Brow, a Tooth for a Pick, was released in September 2006 via Shock Records and reached the ARIA Albums Chart.

The group disbanded soon after Simon McGuigan left in 2007 with then-guitarist, Robert Bravington. The two played and recorded together in Baby Brain (2008/09) before starting Thread Count Music Production in 2010. Adams and Paxton played on recordings by Dan Kelly – Adams is a member of his live backing band. Paxton appeared as a guest member of Midnight Juggeranuts and Architecture in Helsinki at live shows. Adams is founder of Singhala Music, a music bookings and online media business. Joe McGuigan performed as Garage Joe, a trio consisting of members of Little Red.

== Members ==
- Indra Adams – bass guitar, backing vocals
- Joe McGuigan – rhythm Guitar, vocals
- Simon McGuigan – drums
- Dallas Paxton – electric piano, Hammond organ, backing vocals
- Robert Bravington – guitar

== Discography ==
=== Studio albums ===
List of albums, with Australian chart positions
Title	Album details	Peak chart positions
Title	Album details	AUS
An Eye for a Brow, a Tooth for a Pick	Released: September 2006; Format: CD; Label: Love&Mercy/Shock (BRIAR010)	99

=== Extended plays ===
List of EPs, with selected details
Title	Details
Ground Components	Released: 2003; Format: CD; Label: Love&Mercy (briar006)
It all Catches up with You / One Step Back	Released: 2004; Format: CD; Label: Love&Mercy (briar008)
