= The Recording Studio =

The Recording Studio is a 2019 Australian TV series broadcast nationally by the ABC. Narrated by Megan Washington it brings everyday Australians into a professional recording studio to record a song.

The music from the series won the 2019 ARIA Award for Best Original Soundtrack, Cast or Show Album.
