= Snout (band) =

Australian band

- Origin: Melbourne, Victoria, Australia
- Genres: Australian indie rock, indie rock, alternative rock, Australian rock
- Years active: 1991–2002
- Labels: Au Go Go; W.Minc Productions
- Past members: Ross McLennan; Ewan McCartney; Anthony Paine; Greg Ng; Rob Wolf; Hugh E. Williams

Snout were an Australian indie rock band who were formed in Melbourne in 1991 and disbanded in 2002. They released numerous recordings and were twice nominated for an Australian Record Industry Association Award. Ross McLennan, the founder of the band, has since gone on as a solo artist who has been nominated for the Australian Music Prize. Anthony Paine, has also gone on to be nominated for this award, with the group Black Cab.

== History ==
Founded by Ross McLennan in Melbourne, Australia in 1991. Snout made their first recorded appearance the following year on a Half a Cow Records compilation, Slice Two They went on to be a fixture of the Australian independent music scene until their demise in 2002.

The band's first release in their own right was in 1993 with the Cleans and Brightens EP, through the Au Go Go label. In 1994 they released their debut album, What's That Sound?

The lineup at this time consisted of Ross McLennan (Bass and vocals), Rob Wolf (Guitar and backing vocals) and Hugh Williams (Drums).

Soon after the recording of What's That Sound?, Rob and Hugh left the band. McLennan recruited Greg Ng for guitar and backing vocal duties. Ng had previously fronted Melbourne shoegaze exponents Afterglow. New drummer, Ewan McCartney had previously performed with Ripe.

This combination recorded the band's most successful releases; The New Pop Dialogue (1996) and Circle High and Wide (1998).

This lineup remained stable until 1999, when Ng left the band and was replaced by Anthony Paine, of High Pass Filter, who played guitar on the band's final album, Managing Good Looks (2001). This album was released on W.Minc Productions, run by Graham Lee (The Triffids) and Steve Miller (The Moodists). Two tracks featured Rebecca Barnard on backing vocals.

Snout played extensively on the live circuit in Australia, leaving Melbourne regularly to tour in their own right and with other prominent names of the era. They also played festivals such as The Big Day Out, Falls Festival, Sunny Sedgewick, Livid and Meredith Music Festival.

Snout played their final gig in November 2002, in Melbourne at the Rob Roy Hotel.

During the 2010 Australian Federal election campaign, Australian Greens candidate Adam Bandt, professed that "I am a fan of jangle-pop bands like Bidston Moss, Underground Lovers, Ross McLennan and Snout,"

== Side Projects ==
During the band's existence, McCartney worked on the side projects The Grapes (with Ashley Naylor and Sherry Rich) and as a member of Dan Brodie & the Broken Arrows. Meanwhile, Paine could be found playing with The Hired Guns. McLennan also teamed up with his brother Link, front man of The Meanies to form the lo-fi duo, Meuscram.

== Post break-up ==
After the demise of the band, Ross McLennan, released material as a solo artist. Notably, his album Sympathy for the New World was nominated for the 2008 Australian Music Prize.

Greg Ng released the hip-hop inspired, Straight Out of M-Town under the name DCP. Ewan McCartney went on to drum with The Bakelite Age. Meanwhile, Paine can be found building and repairing guitars under the name Harvester Guitars as well as continuing to be involved with bands. Notably, Black Cab who were nominated for the Australian Music Prize in 2009. Rob Wolf moved to Queensland and works for John Deere tractors. Hugh Williams is a former vice president at Google and a Professor at the Melbourne Business School.

== Discography ==
=== Studio albums ===
List of studio albums, with release date, label and selected chart positions shown
Title	Album details	Peak chart positions
Title	Album details	AUS
What's that Sound?	Released: 1994; Label: Au Go Go (ANDA 173); Formats: 2×CD	—
The New Pop Dialogue	Released: August 1996; Label: Au Go Go (ANDA 207); Formats: CD	98
Circle High & Wide	Released: May 1998; Label: Au Go Go (ANDA 236); Formats: CD	98
Managing Good Looks	Released: 2001; Label: W. Minc (WMINCD 022); Formats: CD	—

=== Extended plays ===
List of EP, with release date and selected details
Title	EP details	Peak chart positions
Title	EP details	AUS
Cleans & Brightens	Released: 1993; Label: Au Go Go (ANDA 159); Formats: CD	—
Night and Day	Released: 1994; Label: Au Go Go (ANDA 192); Formats: CD	—
Cromagnonman	Released: May 1996; Label: Au Go Go (ANDA 205); Formats: CD	198
Winning Smile	Released: November 1996; Label: Au Go Go (ANDA 208); Formats: CD	189
Hey Hey Hey	Released: October 1997; Label: Au Go Go (ANDA 232); Formats: CD	—
Circle High & Wide	Released: 1998; Label: Au Go Go (ANDA 233); Formats: CD	—
Got Sold on Heaven	Released: June 1998; Label: Au Go Go (ANDA 242); Formats: CD	133
Get in the Car	Released: 1998; Label: Au Go Go (ANDA 248); Formats: CD	—
Stocking Feet Grooves	Released: 2000; Label: Shock (BIRDHIPPED001); Formats: CD	—
Non Stop Fun	Released: 2001; Label: W. Minc (WMINCD024); Formats: CD	—

== Awards and nominations ==
=== ARIA Music Awards ===
The ARIA Music Awards is an annual awards ceremony that recognises excellence, innovation, and achievement across all genres of Australian music.

Year	Nominee / work	Award	Result
1997	The New Pop Dialogue	Best Pop Release	Nominated
1998	Circle High and Wide	Best Pop Release	Nominated
