= Mim Suleiman =

Tanzanian singer

- Origin: Tanzania
- Genres: House
- Occupation: Singer
- Labels: BubbleTease Communication
- Website: mimsuleiman.co.uk

Mim Suleiman is a Zanzibar-born Tanzanian singer, songwriter, composer, performer, workshop facilitator and campaigner. She currently resides in Sheffield, England. She has worked with Maurice Fulton, Bi Kidule, Ben UFO and Mood II Swing.

== Career ==
Suleiman moved to the UK from Zanzibar in the 1980s, teaching metallurgy at the University of Birmingham before turning her career to music by her late 20s after participating in a festival. As she states, "what was once as a person of no art has become now an artist within fifteen years... it's given me a depth of life I've never had before".

She took singing lessons in college and was initially given English songs to sing, but felt more comfortable when provided with South African pieces. Her first performance was a 15-minute choir presentation for which she earned £7. After that, she performed in more festivals until she decided to quit her job and focus on music.

She released her first album Tungi in 2010. In 2013, her song "Mingi" was featured in the video game Grand Theft Auto V soundtrack, on the game's fictional Soulwax FM radio station.

The third album, Adera Dera, came on 14 September 2015 via BubbleTease Communication.

Also in 2015, she had a leading role in the film uSISTA (directed by Zippy Kimundu), which covers the work of women musicians in East Africa.

In 2017, she released her third album Kawaida.

Her music encompasses elements from afro-beat, electronic, disco, deep house, soul, and traditional folk music. She mainly sings in her native language Swahili, but occasionally uses other languages such as English and Fulani. When asked if she sees her work as afrofuturism, she stated that she doesn't "categorize any of my music—everyone else does that without asking me. [...] If my music is futuristic, it's futuristic because it's never been done before."

== Discography ==
=== Albums ===
- Tungi (BubbleTease Communications, 2010)
- Umbeya (BubbleTease Communications, 2012)
- Adera Dera (BubbleTease Communications, 2015)
- Kawaida (BubbleTease Communications, 2017)
- Si Bure (BubbleTease Communications, 2019)
- Poa (2022)

=== Singles and EPs ===
- "Mingi" (Running Back, 2010)
- "Nyuli" (Running Back, 2010)
