= Kyu =

Kyu or KYU can refer to:

== People ==
- Kyu Blu Kelly (born 2001), American football cornerback
- Kyu Mogami, Japanese wrestler
- Kyū Sakamoto (1941–1985), Japanese singer and actor
- Kyū Sazanka (1914–1971), Japanese actor
- Yang Kyu (died 1011), Goryeo dynasty military official

== Other uses ==
- Karenni language (ISO 639: kyu), Karen dialect continuum spoken in Myanmar
- Koyukuk Airport (IATA: KYU), airport in Koyukuk, Alaska, United States
- Kyū, Japanese-language term referring to one's grade or rank in an activity
