= Ross McLennan (singer) =

- Born: Ross James McLennan
- Origin: Melbourne, Victoria, Australia
- Genre: Indie rock
- Occupation: Musician
- Instruments: Bass guitar; lead vocals
- Years active: 1986–present
- Labels: Au Go Go; W. Minc; Mistletone/Inertia

Ross James McLennan is an Australian indie rock musician and songwriter. He was the founding mainstay of indie guitar pop band, Snout, from 1991 to 2002. He undertook a side project, Meuscram, with his younger brother, Lindsay (a.k.a. Link Meanie of the Meanies) to deliver a lo-fi self-titled album in 1995. McLennan has issued four solo albums, Hits from the Brittle Building (February 2004), Sympathy for the New World (February 2008), The Night's Deeds Are Vapour (2013) and All the Colours Print Can Manage (October 2017). Sympathy for the New World was short-listed for the Australian Music Prize for 2008.

== Biography ==
=== 1980s-1990: The Hybrid ===
Ross McLennan started his music career in Melbourne in the mid-1980s on bass guitar and vocals in a pop group, the Hybrid, alongside Peter Caffyn on trumpet, Phil Faiers on drums, Drew Nelson on saxophone and Rob Wolf on guitar and vocals. Australian musicologist, Ian McFarlane, felt they were, "Utilising a solid pop base, the band was able to lay catchy melodies, punky guitar riffs and blazing horn arrangements over the top." They issued a single, "The Iceman Cometh" (October 1989) and an extended play, The Getting Weird of Nigel Budweg (1990). The Hybrid disbanded in November 1991.

=== 1991-2002: Snout & Meuscram ===
McLennan and Wolf formed an indie guitar pop trio, Snout, with Hugh Williams on drums. They issued four albums, What's that Sound? (1994), The New Pop Dialogue (1996), Circle High & Wide (1998) and Managing Good Looks (2001). While that group was in hiatus in 1995, McLennan (as Ross Snout) formed a lo-fi duo, Meuscram, with his older brother, Lindsay (a.k.a. Link Meanie of the Meanies) on guitar to release an album, Meuscram – Featuring the Sounds of Link Meanie & Ross Snout (October 1995) via Au Go Go Records. Snout broke up in November 2002.

=== 2003- present: solo career ===
McLennan released a solo album, Hits from the Brittle Building in February 2004, via W. Minc. Bernard Zuel of The Sydney Morning Herald observed that he, "still has the schnoz for a bittersweet pop gem... [it] can veer from utterly charming yet with a wicked heart, to sharply spiked, but with a soft, almost delicate centre." McLennan recalled how he had first used, "computer recording replacing tape machines and stuff. Cal Orr, who was managing Snout in the 90s, built me a computer and set it up for me and I just went for it... The mixing is pretty wacky. The fidelity of that record is pretty in your face. I didn't really know anything about creating space in mixes, everything's really up and your face and crowded. It was such fun."

His second solo album, Sympathy for the New World was released in 2008 via Mistletone Records. The Age's Jo Roberts compared it to his previous album, "[it] swims even deeper into fantastic labyrinthine worlds of singing strings, ghostly brass and fluid, visceral sounds that take on an almost filmic quality, especially when paired with McLennan's vivid, at times out-there lyrics. Like Beck, Brian Wilson or Lambchop's Kurt Wagner, McLennan's musical vision is unimpeded by predictability or tradition." McLennan felt, "it's a lot darker kind of record. I think my lack of humour was starting to kick in a bit. I was also on medication at the time and that changed my brain a little bit too." Sympathy for the New World was nominated and then short-listed for the Australian Music Prize (AMP) of 2008.

A third solo album, The Night's Deeds Are Vapour, was released in 2013. It was long-listed for the AMP of 2013.

In October 2017 he issued his fourth solo album, All the Colours Print Can Manage.

== Discography ==
=== Albums ===
Title	Details
Hits from the Brittle Building	Released: 9 February 2004; Label: W. Minc Records (WMINCD031); Format: CD
Sympathy for the New World	Released: February 2008; Label: Mistletone Records (MIST015); Format: CD
The Night's Deeds Are Vapour	Released: February 2013; Label: Mistletone Records (MIST060); Format: CD
All the Colours Print Can Manage	Released: 6 October 2017; Label: Mistletone Records (MIST082); Format: CD, DD, streaming

== Awards and nominations ==
=== Australian Music Prize ===
The Australian Music Prize (the AMP) is an annual award of $30,000 given to an Australian band or solo artist in recognition of the merit of an album released during the year of award. The commenced in 2005.

Year	Nominee / work	Award	Result
2008	For the New World	Australian Music Prize	Nominated
