= The Peep Tempel =

Australian musical group

- The Peep Tempel in Melbourne 2014

Background information
- Origin: Melbourne, Australia
- Genres: punk rock; post-punk; noise rock
- Years active: 2008–2017
- Label: Wing Sing
- Past members: Steven Carter; Blake Scott; Stewart Rayner
- Website: wingsing.co

The Peep Tempel is a punk rock band from Melbourne, Australia. The band's line-up for most of its tenure was Blake Scott (vocals, guitar), Steven Carter (drums) and Stewart Rayner (bass guitar). The band released three studio albums: The Peep Tempel (2012), Tales (2014) and Joy (2016).

== History ==
=== 2008–2013: formation and The Peep Tempel ===
The Peep Tempel was formed in 2008 as a two-piece by singer-songwriter Blake Scott and drummer Steven Carter who were neighbours at the time. As a two-piece, the band recorded in their own home studio and released two 7-inch singles through the imprint Wing Sing. The band's name came from a strip club in Vienna.

In late 2011, Stewart Rayner joined the band to play bass guitar and during 2012 the band toured both in Australia and Europe as a three-piece.

In 2011 The Peep Tempel invited Matthew Duffy, who had recorded the band's first two singles along with Clinton Kraus, to join the band to play bass guitar for their debut studio album. The Peep Tempel recorded and released their debut album The Peep Tempel in 2012 through Wing Sing. The Peep Tempel was nominated in the category of Best Independent Hard Rock or Punk Album at the AIR Awards of 2012.

In 2013, the band recorded the EP Modern Professional, which was released through Wing Sing in June 2013.

=== 2014–2017: Tales & Joy ===
In 2014 the band recorded their second studio album Tales, which was released through Wing Sing in October 2014. Tales was shortlisted for the 2014 Australian Music Prize and nominated in the category of Best Independent Hard Rock, Heavy or Punk Album at the AIR Awards of 2015.

"Carol," a song featured on Tales, was shortlisted for the 2014 Song of the Year APRA Awards (Australia) and nominated in the category of Best Song at the Music Victoria Awards of 2015.

In 2016, The Peep Tempel recorded their third album Joy at Sing Sing Studios with Anna Laverty. The album was released 14 October 2016. The band played their final shows in 2017 before entering an indefinite hiatus.

=== 2017-2023: Other projects ===
Since the band's hiatus, Carter and Rayner have formed a new band, Shepparton Airplane. Scott, meanwhile, released his debut solo album Niscitam in October 2020.

=== 2024- present: Comeback ===
In February 2024, Peep Tempel reformed to headline OK Motels, a festival in the Victorian town of Charlton.

== Discography ==
=== Albums ===
Title	Details
The Peep Tempel	Released: February 2012; Label: Wing Sing (AR005); Format: CD, LP, digital download
Tales	Released: October 2014; Label: Wing Sing (AR007); Format: CD, LP, digital download
Joy	Released: 14 October 2016; Label: Wing Sing (AR008); Format: CD, LP, digital download

=== Extended plays ===
Title	Details
Modern Professional	Released: 11 June 2013; Label: Wing Sing (AR006); Format: CD, 12" LP, digital download

== Awards ==
=== AIR Awards ===
The Australian Independent Record Awards (commonly known informally as AIR Awards) is an annual awards night to recognise, promote and celebrate the success of Australia's Independent Music sector.

Year	Nominee / work	Award	Result
2012	The Peep Tempel	Best Independent Hard Rock or Punk Album	Nominated
2015	Tales	Best Independent Hard Rock or Punk Album	Nominated

=== APRA Awards ===
The APRA Awards are presented annually from 1982 by the Australasian Performing Right Association (APRA), "honouring composers and songwriters". They commenced in 1982.

Year	Nominee / work	Award	Result	Ref.
2015	"Carol" (Steven Carter, Stewart Rayner & Blake Scott)	Song of the Year	Shortlisted	

=== Australian Music Prize ===
The Australian Music Prize (the AMP) is an annual award of $30,000 given to an Australian band or solo artist in recognition of the merit of an album released during the year of award. The commenced in 2005.

Year	Nominee / work	Award	Result
2014	Tales	Australian Music Prize	Nominated
2016	Joy	Australian Music Prize	Nominated

=== Music Victoria Awards ===
The Music Victoria Awards (previously known as The Age EG Awards and The Age Music Victoria Awards) are an annual awards night celebrating Victorian music.

Year	Nominee / work	Award	Result	Ref.
2015	"Carol"	Best Song	Nominated	
2015	themselves	Best Band	Nominated	
2015	themselves	Best Live Band	Nominated	
2016	themselves	Best Live Band	Nominated	
2017	themselves	Best Live Act	Nominated	
