= Six Ft Hick =

Australian musical group

SixFtHick
- Origin: Brisbane, Queensland, Australia
- Genres: Alternative rock, punk, swamp rock
- Years active: 1995–2024
- Labels: Spooky, Valve
- Members: Geoff Corbett; Ben Corbett; Dan Baebler; Tony Giacca
- Past members: Fred Noonan
- Website: Official MySpace

SixFtHick was an Australian swamp rock band formed in Brisbane, Queensland in 1995, noted for the unpredictable antics of its two singers, brothers Geoff and Ben Corbett. Formed in 1995, the band have released four albums to date, relentlessly touring Australia and supporting artists such as The Jesus Lizard, Fugazi, The White Stripes, Beasts of Bourbon, TISM and Jon Spencer Blues Explosion.

On 5 November 2010, 6ft Hick: Notes From The Underground premiered as part of the Brisbane International Film Festival, the documentary centers around the band's third tour of Europe for which they performed fifteen shows in just eighteen days. It was first screened on Australian TV on the ABC 2 channel 16 February 2011 and has been shown internationally as part of various European film festivals.

Drummer Fred Noonan died of cancer on 9 May 2024.

== Discography ==
=== Studio albums ===
- Chicken (Valve, 2000)
- Lap of Luxury (Valve, 2002)
- Cane Trash (Spooky, 2006)
- On The Rocks (Spooky, 2008)

=== Live albums ===
- Train Crash (Spooky, 2006). Recorded live at The Annandale (Sydney) and The Tote (Melbourne) during late 2005.

=== Extended plays ===
- Cousins (Valve, 1997)
- Daddy's Home (Valve, 2000)
- 12 Inch (Beast, 2007)
- Barely Legal (2010)
