= DJ Harvey =

British DJ (born 1961)

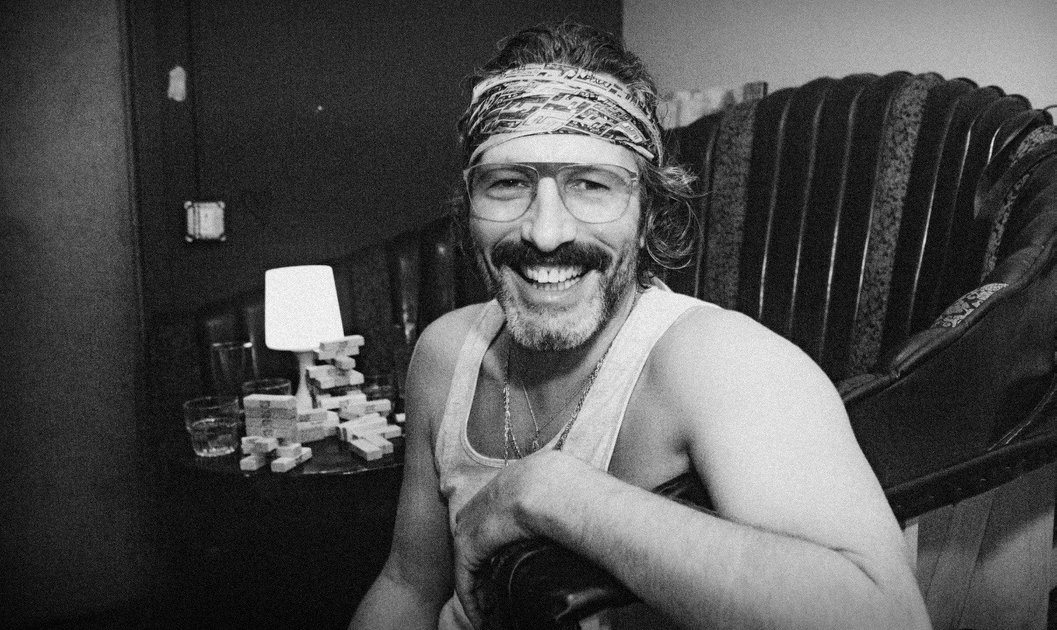
- DJ Harvey in Los Angeles, 2017

Background information
- Born: Harvey William Bassett; 26 July 1961 (age 64); London, England
- Origin: Cambridge, England
- Occupations: DJ, musician, producer
- Years active: 1991–present

Harvey William Bassett (born 1961), known by his stage name, DJ Harvey is an English DJ. He was an early exponent of the US disco/garage/house sound in the UK.

== Career ==
=== Ersatz and transition to DJing (1978–1991) ===
At age 13, he became a drummer for a Cambridge punk band Ersatz. The band formed an indie label, Leisure Sounds, releasing the single "Smile in Shadow", which was broadcast on BBC Radio 1 by John Peel. Ersatz released records with Harvey on drums from 1978 to 1983.

On a trip to New York City in 1985, Harvey was inspired by the emerging hip-hop movement. He felt that "cutting up" breaks was an extension of drumming and so purchased his first pair of Technics, brought them home and practised. He was a graffiti artist and member of the group TDK (Tone Deaf Crew), which was later renamed TONKA Hi Fi. The group threw weekend-long parties in Cambridge, Brighton, London and on the festival circuit. The Brighton parties continued for five years, from 1988 to 1993, to The Zap Club, and, after the club closed at 2 am, on the beach at Black Rock.

His focus moved from hip hop, electro and disco to house music and garage, and he began playing more parties in London with the US DJs Francois Kevorkian and Kenny Carpenter, playing at clubs including Solaris and Freedom.

In 1991, Harvey was a full-time DJ with his own weekly night "Moist" at the Gardening Club in London. He brought over DJs from New York City and other US cities including Larry Levan, He held six-hour mixes of disco, house, garage and rock records, a sound he has carried through to later residencies, including at the Hard Left at the Blue Note.

=== Ministry of Sound, collaborations and other projects (1990s—present) ===
After Moist ended, Harvey began a residency at London's Ministry of Sound. Harvey's association with Ministry of Sound resulted in a 1996 mix album, Late Night Sessions. He played for clubs including Cream in Liverpool and Back to Basics in Leeds, and in Ibiza. Late night sessions launched many copy cat laid back compilations series since and is among the labels most successful release.

He is one half of the duo behind the BC record label, on which he has recreated edits of disco records by house music artists including friend Larry Levan and Ron Hardy.

Harvey was married in Hawaii where he resided and founded a successful gallery and nightclub thirtyninehotel in Honolulu, he custom built the sound and purchased some RLA audio speakers as well as being gifted some components from a famous defunct NY club. He played at the club exclusively inviting guests such as David Mancuso to join him. He realized the business partnership and marriage was exploitative and destructive and left, his ex wife resurfaced some years later reselling his audio equipment on eBay.

He relocated to Los Angeles, and performed around the US with a bi-monthly residency at Santos in New York. Around this time he collaborated with Thomas Bullock (of Rub'N'Tug and A.R.E. Weapons) on the disco rock project Map of Africa.

His debut tour of Australia and first trip out of the US ended in him destroying a few thousand dollars' worth of DJ gear in a rumored homage to an idol and after discovering his set was being recorded without authorization. He replaced and paid for repairs on all, some loaned from a local DJ friend. He was closing out the sunrise set at the Meredith Music Festival. In 2012 he played alongside DJ James Murphy of LCD Soundsystem at MOCA, as well as PS1 NY for Kraftwerk and FYF Fest.

His electronic recording project is as Locussolus, released on International Feel Recordings. He released singles in 2012 and later a full album featuring vocals by Tara Selleck (niece of actor Tom Selleck), actress Sam Fox, and DJ Heidi Lawden (credited under a pseudonym of Lusardi)who also co produced.

In 2013, Harvey opened an online store "Harvey's General Store" (HGS) with his son Harley, where he sells various merchandise as well as music both new and old and his highly regarded and successful Mercury Rising compilation series. HGS has collaborated with Wacko Maria, Neighborhood, Stussy Virgil Abloh is a fan and frequently photographed in HGS original designs and collaborations. In the summer of 2014, he released an album with a new band, Wildest Dreams, on Smalltown Supersound. The album was well received.

At the DJ Awards in Ibiza, Harvey was the recipient of the Outstanding Contribution Award, in recognition of his body of work and influence within the electronic music industry. he has an on island residency every summer Mercury Rising at Pikes Hotel in Freddie Mercury's old hotel suite converted into a club. He tours the world extensively playing clubs and festivals while being based in Los Angeles

In 2018, he appeared in a scene as himself in the movie Mission: Impossible – Fallout.

Harvey composed the score for the 2022 short film Bad Acid. He is currently recording a new album under the name The Dreams and co music supervising (with Mary Ramos) inc scoring Greatest Hits movie to be released via Searchlight in 2023 He is rumored to have a role in the movie as well as a character based on his conversations with the director. He has appeared in high end publications including GQ, Vogue The New Yorker, Rolling Stone and Kaleidoscope for which he graced their cover he has also had cover features in dance music publications DJ Magazine, Mixmag in multiple territories.
