= Legends of Motorsport (band) =

- Origin: North Hobart, Tasmania, Australia
- Genres: Stoner rock; garage rock
- Years active: 1997–present
- Labels: Low Transit Industries; High Beam Music; Mt Panorama Records; Reverberation
- Members: Jean Claude Vangelis; 2Stroke; Richard Fyshwick; Thomas the Wank Engine; Hertz Van Rental
- Past members: Mike the Hammer; Lightnin' Watkins; Honest Lee; Whiskey Ago Go
- Website: http://www.myspace.com/legendsofmotorsport

Legends of Motorsport is a rock band formed in Hobart and based in Melbourne, Australia.

Legends of Motorsport have released three albums. The first was Dual Fuel which was a compilation of their Beef With Cheese and Legends Of Motorsport EPs. Their second was Remnants From The Big Bang (2006) released on Reverberation and featuring cover art by Peter Bagge. The third, released in November 2009, is entitled Yeah Uh Huh. The last LP, entitled Survival of the Fittes was released April 2016 on Cobra Snake Necktie records.

Legends of Motorsport have played at the Big Day Out and Meredith Music Festival and have supported Queens of the Stoneage, Mudhoney, Beasts of Bourbon and Magic Dirt.

The Legends played the Last Big Bang on 1 April 2017.

== Discography ==
=== Albums/EPs ===
- Survival of the Fittest – (LP) (May 2016)
- Yeah Uh Huh – Low Transit Industries (November 2009)
- Remnants From the Big Bang – Reverberation (September 2006)
- Dual Fuel (August, 2005)
- Beef with Cheese (EP) – High Beam Music (2002)
- Legends of Motorsport (EP) (2001)

=== Singles ===
- "Meat and Potatoes" - Reverberation (July, 2006)
- "Mess It Up" - Reverberation (July, 2006)
- "Drivin"/"No Sense" - Mt Panorama Records (2005)
- "Free Radical Oxygen Cells" - Mt Panorama Records (1992)
- "Warm Milk With Honey"/"Don't Need Love" (Four track maxi single)
