= Sampa the Great discography =

Discography of Zambian singer and songwriter, Sampa the Great

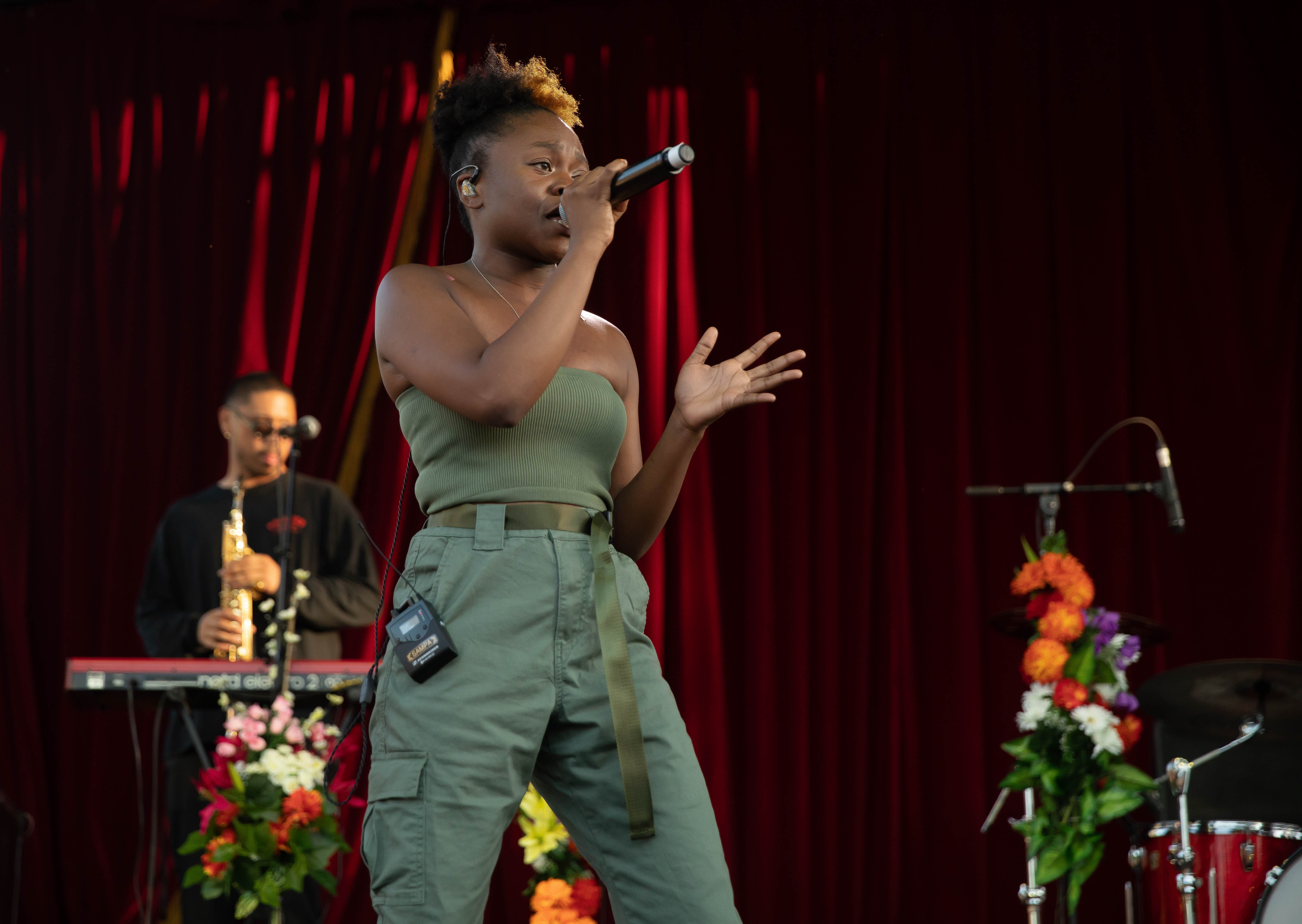
- Sampa the Great in Sydney, 2018
- Studio albums: 2
- EPs: 1

Zambian born, Australian based singer Sampa the Great has released two studio albums, two mixed tapes and one extended play. She is the only artist to win the Australian Music Prize twice; Birds and the Bee9 (2017) and The Return (2019).

== Albums ==
=== Studio albums ===
List of studio albums
| Title | Album details | Peak chart positions |
| Title | Album details | AUS |
|---|---|---|
| The Return | Released: 13 September 2019; Label: Ninja Tune; Format: CD, 2LP, digital download, streaming | 12 |
| As Above, So Below | Released: 9 September 2022; Label: Loma Vista/Concord; Format: CD, LP, digital, streaming | 12 |
| Nu Zamrock | Released: 30 October 2026; Label: Loma Vista/Concord; Format: CD, LP, digital, streaming | TBA |

== Mixtapes ==
List of mixtapes, with release date and label shown
| Title | Mixtape details |
|---|---|
| The Great Mixtape | Released: 16 October 2015; Label: Sampa the Great, Wondercore Island (re-issue); Format: LP, digital download, streaming |
| Birds and the Bee9 | Released: 10 November 2017; Label: Big Dada; Format: LP, digital download, streaming |

== Extended plays ==
List of EPs, with release date and label shown
| Title | EP details |
|---|---|
| Heroes Act 2 | Released: 12 May 2017; Label: Sampa the Great; Format: Digital download |

== Singles ==
=== As lead artist ===
| Title | Year | Album |
|---|---|---|
| "F E M A L E" | 2015 | The Great Mixtape |
| "Black Dignity" | 2016 | Non-album singles |
| "Blue Boss" | 2016 | Non-album singles |
| "24" | 2016 | Non-album singles |
| "Blessings" | 2016 | Non-album singles |
| "Everybody's Hero" (featuring Estelle) | 2017 | Heroes Act 2 |
| "The Plug" (featuring Estelle) | 2017 | Heroes Act 2 |
| "Paved with Gold" (featuring Estelle) | 2017 | Heroes Act 2 |
| "Rhymes to the East" | 2017 | Birds and the Bee9 |
| "Bye River" | 2017 | Birds and the Bee9 |
| "Energy" (featuring Nadeem Din-Gabisi) | 2018 | Non-album single |
| "Final Form" | 2019 | The Return |
| "OMG" | 2019 | The Return |
| "Freedom" | 2019 | The Return |
| "Time's Up" (featuring Krown) | | The Return |
| "Better Days" (with Baker Boy and Dallas Woods) | 2020 | Non-album single |
| "Lane" (with Denzel Curry) | 2022 | As Above, So Below |
| "Never Forget" (with Chef 187, Tio Nason and Mwanjé) | 2022 | As Above, So Below |
| "Bona" | 2022 | As Above, So Below |
| "Let Me Be Great" (featuring Angelique Kidjo) | 2022 | As Above, So Below |
| "Supa Team 4" (with Ezra Collective) | 2023 | Supa Team 4 |
| "Life Goes On" (with Ezra Collective) | 2024 | |
| "Emi Aluta" (with Seun Kuti and Egypt 80) | 2025 | |
| "Goat" | 2025 | |
| "Can't Hold Us" (featuring Mwanjé) | 2025 | Nu Zamrock |
| "Self Love" (with Kadeem) | 2026 | |
| "Simon Says" | 2026 | Nu Zamrock |
| "Location" | 2026 | Nu Zamrock |

=== As featured artist ===
List of singles as featured artist, with year released and album shown
| Title | Year | Album |
|---|---|---|
| "Beauty" (Wallace featuring Sampa the Great) | 2015 | Non-album singles |
| "Second Heartbeat" (Urthboy featuring Sampa the Great and Okenyo) | 2016 | The Past Beats Inside Me Like a Second Heartbeat |
| "For Good" (Remi featuring Sampa the Great) | 2016 | Non-album singles |
| "Fire Sign" (Sensible J featuring Remi and Sampa the Great) | 2017 | Non-album singles |
| "Black is Beautiful" (remix) (Chronixx featuring Sampa the Great) | 2019 | Chronology |
| "Outer Body Stranger" (Superego featuring Sampa the Great) | 2020 | Nautilis |
| "Approach with Caution" (Quakers featuring Sampa the Great) | 2020 | The Next Wave |
| "Gold" (KYE featuring Sampa the Great & 18YOMAN) | 2021 | Good Company |
| "Rebel Time" (Moonga K. featuring Sampa the Great) | 2021 | Candid |
| "Wildones" (Mwanjé featuring Sampa the Great) | 2022 | Seasons |
| "Avalanche of Love" (Witch featuring Sampa the Great) | 2023 | TBA |
| "Ungavumi" Sjava featuring Sampa the Great) | 2023 | Isibuko |
| "Joy" (Ezra Collective, Joy Anonymous featuring Sampa the Great) | 2024 | —N/a |
| "Power" (JessB featuring Sister Nancy and Sampa the Great) | 2024 | Feels Like Home |

=== Non single album appearances ===
List of non single album appearances, with year released and album shown
| Title | Year | Artist(s) | Album |
|---|---|---|---|
| "Second Heartbeat" | 2016 | Urthboy featuring Sampa the Great and Okenyo | The Past Beats Inside Me Like a Second Heartbeat |
| "For Good // F.U.B.U." | 2016 | Remi featuring Sampa the Great | Divas and Demons |
| "Wonderland" | 2016 | Sampa the Great | Plastic World Volume 1 |
| "Your Orbit" | 2017 | Ecca Vandal featuring Sampa the Great | Ecca Vandal |
| "Island Rose" | 2017 | Jonti featuring Sampa the Great | Tokorats |
| "For Good" | 2017 | Remi and Sampa the Great | Nova: Haute Musique II |
| "Let That Go" | 2018 | Blinky Bill featuring Sampa the Great | Everyone's Just Winging it and Other Fly Tales |
| "Genesis" | 2018 | Raiza Biza and Remi featuring Sampa the Great | Black Hole Sun - EP |
| "Take Care in Your Dreaming" | 2020 | The Avalanches featuring Tricky, Denzel Curry & Sampa the Great | We Will Always Love You |
| "Agüita" | 2021 | Gabriel Garzón-Montano featuring Sampa the Great | Agüita (Part 1) |

=== Music videos ===
List of music videos, with year released and director shown
| Title | Year | Director(s) |
|---|---|---|
| "HERoes (The Call)" | 2016 | Priit Siimon |
| "HERoes (The Response)" | 2016 | Claudia Sutiono; Priit Siimon |
| "Black Girl Magik" (featuring Nicole Gumbe) | 2018 | Sanjay De Silva |
| "Energy" (featuring Nadeem Din-Gabisi) | 2018 | Modu Sesay |
| "Final Form" | 2019 | Sanjay De Silva |
| "OMG" | 2019 | Sanjay De Silva |
| "Time's Up" (featuring Krown) | 2020 | Sanjay De Silva |
| "Lane" (featuring Denzel Curry) | 2022 | Imraan Christian, Rochelle Nembhard |
| "Never Forget" (featuring Chef 187, Tio Nason, and Mwanjé) | 2022 | Rharha Nembhard, Imraan Christian, Furmaan Ahmed (on set director) |
