= Eden Land =

Studio album by Laura Jean
- Released: 2009
- Genre: Folk, Classical
- Length: 31:59
- Label: Scotland Yard/Shock
- Producer: Laura Jean, Chris Townend

Laura Jean chronology
| Our Swan Song (2006) | Eden Land (2009) | A Fool Who'll (2011) |

Eden Land is the second album from Australian artist Laura Jean. It was released in 2009.

== Track listing ==
All tracks by Laura Jean

| No. | Title | Length |
|---|---|---|
| 1. | "Magic Unnamed / Eden Land" | 4:59 |
| 2. | "November" | 2:14 |
| 3. | "Lady Of The Lake" | 1:51 |
| 4. | "Yellow Moon" | 3:40 |
| 5. | "Mikhael" | 2:45 |
| 6. | "Love Is Going To Lead Us" | 4:31 |
| 7. | "Anniversary" | 4:22 |
| 8. | "Eve" | 3:44 |
| 9. | "Adam" | 3:50 |
| Total length: | | 31:56 |

== Personnel ==
- Laura Jean — vocals, guitar, piano, organ, recorder, bells, backing vocals
- Biddy Connor — viola, backing vocals
- Martin Mackerass — clarinet, backing vocals
- Geoff Dunbar — bass, backing vocals
- Jen Sholakis — drums, percussion, backing vocals

=== Additional personnel ===
- Oliver Mann — backing vocals
- Paddy Mann — backing vocals
- Lehmann Smith — backing vocals
- Liz Stringer — backing vocals
- Mark Bradshaw — backing vocals
- Lawrence John — backing vocals
