= Final Form (disambiguation) =

Final form is a special character used to represent a letter only when it occurs at the end of a word.

Final Form may also refer to:

- "Final Form" (song), a song by Sampa the Great
- "Final Form", a song by Everything Everything from Man Alive
- "Final Form", a song by Lil Yachty from Michigan Boy Boat
- "Final Form", a song by As Friends Rust
- Final Form, a video game by Plaion
