= Floodlight (disambiguation) =

A floodlight is an artificial light providing even illumination across a wide area.

Floodlight may also refer to:

- High-intensity discharge lamp, the class of lamp itself
- Stage lighting instrument, the types associated with stage productions
- Floodlights (film), British television film
- Floodlights (band), Australian rock band
