= Our Swan Song =

Studio album by Laura Jean
- Released: May 1, 2006
- Genre: Folk, Classical
- Length: 44:17
- Label: UAR Records/Stomp (original); Scotland Yard/Shock (reissue)
- Producer: Simon Grounds, Laura Jean

Laura Jean chronology
| I'm a Rabbit, I'm a Fox E.P. (2003) | Our Swan Song (2006) | Eden Land (2008) |

Our Swan Song is the debut 2006 release from Laura Jean. "I'm a Rabbit, I'm a Fox" and "A Good Thing" were released as radio singles and achieved high rotation on Triple J. The album had a reissue release on September 1, 2007 when Jean changed record labels.

== Track listing ==
1. "The Hunter's Ode" (Laura Jean) - 4:16
2. "The Mid-Way" (Jean) - 4:14
3. "A Good Thing" (Jean) - 3:54
4. "I Don't Know" (Jean) - 3:14
5. "The Ferry" (Jean) - 3:19
6. "I'm a Rabbit, I'm a Fox" (Jean) - 3:53
7. "It's Supposed to be Summer" (Jean) - 4:07
8. "Paradise Lost" (Jean) - 4:32
9. "Happiness" (Jean) - 4:53
10. "Solace" (Jean) - 4:16
11. "Our Swan Song" (Jean) - 3:33

== Credits ==
- Laura Jean - Vocals, guitar, percussion, piano, backing vocals
- Biddy Connor - Electric guitar
- Ian Downie - Guitar
- Alex Miller - Double bass, contrabass
- Simon Grounds - Bass troll
- Erica Englert - Backing vocals
- Bruno Siketa - Trumpet
- Rob Shirley - Horn
- Erin McNamara - Trombone
- Shannon Barnett - Trombone
- Adam Greene - Tuba
- Zachary Johnston - Violin
- Elizabeth Donellan - Violin
- Phoebe Green - Viola
- Cally Tromans - Violoncello
- Sam Dunscombe - Clarinet
- Michael Powell - Oboe
- Adam Mikulicz - Bassoon
- Amelia Coleman - Oboe
- Linda Pearson - Bassoon
