= Birds and the Bee9 =

Mixtape by Sampa the Great
- Released: 10 November 2017
- Genre: Rap; R&B
- Label: Big Dada

Sampa the Great chronology
Heroes Act 2 (2017)	Birds and the Bee9 (2017)	The Return (2019)

Singles from Birds and the BEE9
- 1. "Rhymes to the East" Released: 3 October 2017c 2. "Bye River" Released: 17 October 2017

Birds and the Bee9 (stylised as Birds and the BEE9) is the second mixtape by Zambian singer-songwriter and rapper Sampa the Great. It was released in November 2017. The album won the 2017 Australian Music Prize.

== Reception ==
Professional ratings
Review scores
Source	Rating
The Guardian	3/5 stars
SunGenre	3/5 stars

Kitty Empire from The Guardian said "Though swaggeringly up to date in places, her tracks sound far closer to Lauryn Hill than they do to 2017's breakout star Cardi B, nodding to reggae, soul and jazz. The complex question of identity keeps cropping up. 'How you supposed to be black down under?' Tembo wonders on 'Bye River'". Empire called the mixed tape "an intriguing appetiser".

Dan Webb from SunGenre said the album "shows great promise and moments of brilliance" but concluded with "...after repeat listens, we're still not entirely sure what to make of this album."

== Track listing ==
No.	Title	Producer(s)	Length
1.	"Healing"	Sensible J	3:09
2.	"Flowers" (featuring Remi)	Sensible J	3:26
3.	"Protect Your Queen"	Justin Smith	3:29
4.	"Rhymes to the East"	Sensible J	4:07
5.	"Can I Get a Key"	Kwes Darko	3:42
6.	"Black Girl Magik" (featuring Nicole Gumbe)	Kwes Darko	3:41
7.	"Casper" (featuring Syreneyiscreamy)	Silentjay	4:16
8.	"Karma the Villain"	Silentjay	3:16
9.	"Bye River"	Silentjay	7:42
10.	"Inner Voice" (featuring Mwanje Tembo)	Silentjay	5:23
11.	"The Truth"	Sensible J	1:20
12.	"I Am Me"	Kwes Darko	3:33
13.	"Healer" (featuring Zaachariaha)	Sensible J	3:03
Total length:			55:07

== Release history ==
Region	Date	Format	Label	Catalogue
Various	13 September 2019	CD, digital download, streaming	Big Dada	BD287
Australia	27 September 2019	LP	Big Dada/Ninja Tune	BD287C
