= Liz Stringer =

Australian singer-songwriter

- Born: Australia
- Genre: Folk rock
- Occupation: Singer-songwriter
- Instrument: Vocals
- Years active: 2006-present
- Label: Milk!
- Website: www.lizstringer.com

Liz Stringer is an Australian singer-songwriter, based in Melbourne, Victoria. As of April 2025, Stringer has released eight studio albums, a live album and two extended plays. Since 2013 she has released music with Mia Dyson and Jen Cloher under the name Dyson Stringer Cloher.

== Career ==
Stringer's debut studio album was released in 2006.

In August 2008, Stringer was invited by Deborah Conway to take part in the Broad Festival project, which toured major Australian cities including performing at the Sydney Opera House. With Stringer and Conway were Laura Jean, Dianna Corcoran and Elana Stone – they performed their own and each other's songs.

In August 2013 Stringer collaborated with Mia Dyson and Jen Cloher and formed Dyson Stringer Cloher. The trio released an EP which featured an individual track from each musician. They then took on the road, playing over 40 shows around the country.

In 2019, Stringer reunited with Dyson and Cloher. The trio recorded a self-titled album in eight days at The Loft in Chicago in April 2019, which was released in October 2019 and toured nationally.

In February 2021, it was announced that Stringer had signed with Milk! Records as a solo artist. In April 2021, Stringer released her sixth studio album, First Time Really Feeling, recorded at Toronto's Union Sound Company and produced and engineered by Chris Stringer.

In November 2024, Stringer released the single "Coming Home". In January 2025 Stringer announced the release of her seventh studio album, The Second High.

== Discography ==
=== Studio albums ===
Title	Details	Peak chart positions
Title	Details	AUS
Soon	Released: 2006; Label: Liz Stringer (LSS001); Format: CD, digital download	—
Pendulum	Released: 2008; Label: Liz Stringer (LSS002); Format: CD, digital download	—
Tides of Time	Released: April 2010; Label: Liz Stringer (LSS003); Format: CD, digital download	—
Warm in the Darkness	Released: 10 April 2012; Label: Liz Stringer/Vitamin (LSS004); Format: CD, digital download	—
All the Bridges	Released: July 2016; Label: Liz Stringer (LSS006); Format: CD, digital download, LP, streaming	—
First Time Really Feeling	Released: 30 April 2021; Label: Milk! Records (MILK057); Format: CD, digital download, LP, streaming	14
The Second High	Released: 28 March 2025; Label: Dot Dash; Format: CD, digital download, LP, streaming	—

=== Live albums ===
Title	Details
Live at the Yarra	Released: October 2014; Label: Liz Stringer (LSS005); Format: CD, digital download, CD/DVD

=== with Jess McAvoy ===
Title	Details
Somewhere	Released: 2011; Label: Henduwin Music (JHM012); Format: CD, digital download

=== with Dyson Stringer Cloher ===
Title	Details
Dyson Stringer Cloher (EP)	Released: September 2013; Label: Milk! Records; Format: CD, digital download
Dyson Stringer Cloher (LP)	Released: October 2019; Label: Milk! Records (MILK045); Format: CD, digital download, LP, streaming

== Awards ==
=== AIR Awards ===
The Australian Independent Record Awards is an annual awards night to recognise, promote and celebrate the success of Australia's Independent Music sector.

Year	Nominee / work	Award	Result
2020	Dyson Stringer Cloher (as Dyson Stringer Cloher)	Best Independent Blues and Roots Album or EP	Nominated
2022	First Time Really Feeling	Independent Album of the Year	Nominated
2022	First Time Really Feeling	Best Independent Blues and Roots Album or EP	Won
2026	The Second High	Best Independent Blues and Roots Album or EP	Nominated

=== APRA Awards ===
The APRA Awards are presented annually from 1982 by the Australasian Performing Right Association (APRA), "honouring composers and songwriters". They commenced in 1982.

Year	Nominee / work	Award	Result	Ref.
2022	"Dangerous" (Liz Stringer)	Song of the Year	Shortlisted	
2026	"Coming Home" (Liz Stringer)	Song of the Year	Shortlisted	

=== Australian Music Prize ===
The Australian Music Prize (the AMP) is an annual award of $30,000 given to an Australian band or solo artist in recognition of the merit of an album released during the year of award. The commenced in 2005.

Year	Nominee / work	Award	Result
2012	Warm in the Darkness	Australian Music Prize	Nominated

=== EG Awards ===
The EG Awards are an annual awards night celebrating Victorian music.

Year	Nominee / work	Award	Result
2012	Warm in the Darkness	Best Album	Nominated
2012	Liz Stringer	Best Female	Nominated

=== Music Victoria Awards ===
The Music Victoria Awards, are an annual awards night celebrating Victorian music. They commenced in 2013, replacing the EG Awards.

Year	Nominee / work	Award	Result	Ref.
2021	Liz Stringer	Best Solo Artist	Nominated	
