= Jen Cloher =

Australian folk rock musician

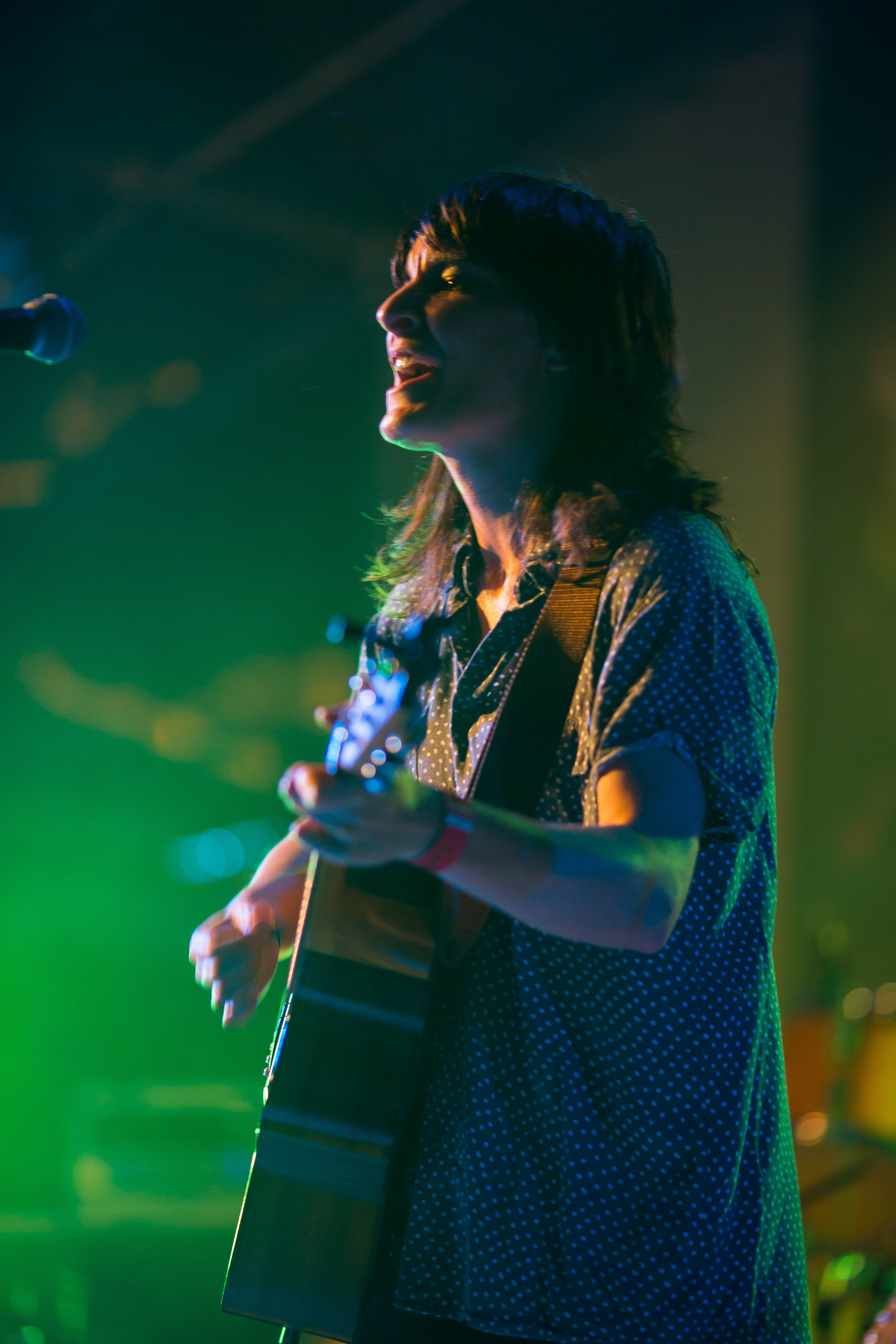
- April 2014

Background information
- Born: 9 October 1973 (age 53); Adelaide, South Australia, Australia
- Genre: Folk rock
- Occupations: Singer; songwriter; record producer
- Instruments: Guitar; vocals; production
- Years active: 2001–present
- Labels: Milk! Records; Marathon Artists
- Website: www.jencloher.com

Jen Cloher (born 9 October 1973) is an Australian singer, songwriter, and record producer, currently based in Melbourne, Victoria. Cloher's 2017 self-titled fourth studio album peaked at number 5 on the Australian ARIA Charts. From 2006 to 2010, Cloher recorded and toured with her (Note: Cloher uses she/her and they/them pronouns. This article uses feminine pronouns for consistency.) band Jen Cloher and the Endless Sea and since 2013 has released with Mia Dyson and Liz Stringer music under the name Dyson Stringer Cloher.

== Career ==
Originally from Adelaide, Cloher moved to Sydney and studied at the National Institute of Dramatic Art (NIDA). Whilst studying, Cloher lived in a share house with several musicians, which is when she bought her first second-hand guitar, and started to write songs. In 1994, Cloher graduated NIDA at the age of 21.

After NIDA, Cloher performed in Andrew Bovell's After Dinner and performed in it at the Edinburgh Festival. Upon returning to Australia, Cloher continued to pursue her music career.

In the late 1990s, Cloher collaborated with Sydney collective Bonepeople on the track "Looking for More".

In 2001, Cloher relocated to Melbourne. Later that year, she released her debut EP titled, Movement Involves Danger, on Regency Records. Cloher then released the EP Permanent Marker via Shiny Records in 2005. The single, "Rain", was played on Triple J.

In 2006, Cloher's debut album Dead Wood Falls was released. It was credited to Jen Cloher and the Endless Sea, a collective of musicians. Its lineup originally included drummer Jen Sholakis, bassist "Lord" Geoffrey Dunbar, guitarist Michael Hubbard, pianist Ross Calia and violinist Andrea Summer. Cloher herself was nominated for ARIA Award for Best Female Artist at the ARIA Music Awards of 2006.

In 2009, Cloher's mother was diagnosed with Alzheimer's and Cloher found songwriting a way of expressing herself. This led to the writing and creation of Cloher's second album, Hidden Hands. The album included the single "Eden with My Eve". Calia and Sumner were replaced by Laura Jean and Biddy Connor, respectively; Tiny Ruins guitarist Tom Healy was also added to the line-up. Following a solo tour with Jordie Lane, Cloher took an extended hiatus from music.

In 2012, Cloher re-emerged and signed with Milk! Records, a label created by Cloher's partner Courtney Barnett the same year. Cloher released a duet with former Kid Sam frontman Kieran Ryan, titled "Call If You Need Me". It was included on the EP Baby We Were Born to Die.

Cloher recorded an album at Melbourne's Headgap Studios. Her backing band included lead guitarist Barnett, bassist Bones Sloane and drummer Sholakis. In October 2012, Cloher released "Mount Beauty", the lead single from her then-yet-to-be-titled third studio album. It was released as a limited-edition split seven-inch, with the flipside containing Courtney Barnett's song "History Eraser". To support the album's release, Cloher began a crowdfunding campaign with a target of $15,000, which she exceeded. In Blood Memory was released in May 2013 and was shortlisted for the Australian Music Prize.

In August 2013 Cloher collaborated with Mia Dyson and Liz Stringer and formed Dyson Stringer Cloher. The trio released an EP which featured an individual track from each musician. They then took on the road, playing over 40 shows around the country.

In January 2014, Cloher won a Victorian Music Management Award.

In June 2014, Cloher released "Stone Age Brain" featuring Tim Rogers. The B-side of the CD single was a cover of The Loved Ones' "Sad Dark Eyes".

In September 2015, Cloher contributed two tracks for the Milk! Records compilation titled Good for You, released in February 2016. The album featured songs from Cloher, Courtney Barnett, The Finks, Ouch My Face, East Brunswick All Girls Choir and Fraser A. Gorman. The EP was supported with a national tour featuring all six artists.

Later that year, Dead Wood Falls was released on vinyl for the very first time in celebration of its 10-year anniversary. The release was supported by a reunion show of the original line-up of Jen Cloher and The Endless Sea in October 2016.

In August 2017, Cloher released her self-titled album. The album was preceded by the singles "Forgot Myself" and "Regional Echo" and debuted at number 5 on the ARIA charts. The album received five star reviews from The Herald Sun, The Guardian and The Independent and was voted Double J's Album of the Year for 2017. The album was shortlisted for the Australian Music Prize.

In December 2017, it was announced that Cloher would be one of the guest judges for Happy Mag's 'Needle in the Hay' vinyl competition.

In 2018, Cloher toured the United States, Europe and Australia.

In 2019, Cloher reunited with Dyson and Stringer. The trio recorded a self-titled album in eight days at The Loft in Chicago in April 2019, which was released in October 2019 and toured nationally.

In March 2023, Cloher released her fifth studio album, I Am the River, the River Is Me.

== Personal life ==
Cloher is of Ngāpuhi and Ngāti Kahu descent through her mother. Cloher uses she/her and they/them pronouns and identifies as Takatāpui and non-binary.

Cloher was in a relationship with Courtney Barnett from 2012 to 2018. Cloher's relationship with Barnett informed much of her 2017 self-titled album. They have sung several songs together, including "Numbers", a song about their relationship and their age difference—Cloher is 14 years older.

Cloher is a cousin of New Zealand singer, Margaret Urlich who died in 2022.

== Backing band members ==
=== Jen Cloher Band ===
Final line-up

- Jen Sholakis – drums, backing vocals (2012–2024)
- Robert Wrigley – lead guitar (2018–2024)
- Nathalie Pavlovic – bass, backing vocals (2022–2024)
- Anika Ostendorf – keyboards, rhythm guitar, backing vocals (2022–2024)

Former members

- Courtney Barnett – lead guitar, backing vocals (2012–2018)
- Bones Sloane – bass, backing vocals (2012–2018)
- Ricky Bradbeer – bass, backing vocals (2018–2022)

=== The Endless Sea ===
- Jen Sholakis – drums (2006–2010, 2016)
- Michael Hubbard – lead guitar (2006–2010, 2016)
- "Lord" Geoffrey Dunbar – bass (2006–2010, 2016)
- Ross Calia – piano (2006–2008, 2016)
- Andrea Summer – violin, backing vocals (2006–2008, 2016)
- Laura Jean – piano, backing vocals (2008–2010)
- Biddy Connor – violin, musical saw, backing vocals (2008–2010)
- Tom Healy – guitar (2008–2010)

== Discography ==
=== Studio albums ===
Title	Details	Peak chart positions
Title	Details	AUS
Dead Wood Falls (credited to Jen Cloher and the Endless Sea)	Released: 2006; Label: Shiny (1subjectogravity); Format: CD, digital download	—
Hidden Hands (credited to Jen Cloher and the Endless Sea)	Released: 2009; Label: Sandcastle Music (SMCD0001); Format: CD, digital download	—
In Blood Memory	Released: May 2012; Label: Milk! (MILK006); Format: CD, digital download, LP	—
Jen Cloher	Released: August 2017; Label: Milk! Records (MILK025); Format: CD, digital download, LP, streaming	5
Dyson, Stringer Cloher (credited to Dyson, Stringer & Cloher)	Released: October 2019; Label: Milk! (MILK045); Format: CD, digital download, LP, streaming	—
I Am the River, the River Is Me	Released: 3 March 2023; Label: Milk! (MILK070); Format: CD, digital download, LP, streaming	30

=== Compilations ===
Title	Details
B Sides and Rarities	Released: March 2018; Label: Milk! Records; Format: digital download, streaming

=== Extended plays ===
Title	Details
Movement Involves Danger	Released: September 2001; Label: Regency Records (48616); Format: CD
Permanent Marker	Released: 2005; Label: Shiny (indelible1); Format: CD, digital download
Limited Edition Tour EP 2009	Released: May 2009; Label: self-released; Format: digital download
Baby We Were Born to Die	Released: 2012; Label: Milk! Records; Format: digital download
Dyson, Stringer & Cloher (credited to Dyson, Stringer & Cloher)	Released: September 2013; Label: Milk! Records; Format: CD, digital download
Live at the Loft and Loews	Released: 28 July 2018; Label: Milk! Records; Format: LP, digital download, streaming
Jen Cloher on Audiotree Live	Released: 22 August 2018; Label: Audiotree Music; Format: digital download, streaming

=== Singles ===
Year	Title	Album
2005	"Rain"	Permanent Marker
2009	"Eden With My Eve" (credited to Jen Cloher and the Endless Sea)	Hidden Hands
2012	"Call If You Need Me" (with Kieran Ryan)	Baby We Were Born to Die
2012	"Mount Beauty"	In Blood Memory
2013	"Toothless Tiger"	In Blood Memory
2013	"Hold My Hand"	In Blood Memory
2014	"Stone Age Brain" (featuring Tim Rogers)	non album single
2015	"Needle in the Hay"	Permanent Marker
2017	"Forgot Myself"	Jen Cloher
2017	"Regional Echo"	Jen Cloher
2017	"Strong Woman"	Jen Cloher
2019	"Falling Clouds" (as Dyson Stringer Cloher)	Dyson Stringer Cloher
2019	"Believer" (as Dyson Stringer Cloher)	Dyson Stringer Cloher
2020	"Sensory Memory" (with Hachiku)	non album single
2021	"Fairytale in the Supermarket" (with Hachiku)	Stars Rock Kill (Rock Stars)
2022	"Mana Takatâpui"	I Am the River, the River Is Me
2022	"Being Human"	I Am the River, the River Is Me
2023	"My Witch"	I Am the River, the River Is Me
2023	"Harakeke"	I Am the River, the River Is Me
2024	"Annabelle"	TBA

== Awards ==
=== AIR Awards ===
The Australian Independent Record Awards is an annual awards night to recognise, promote and celebrate the success of Australia's Independent Music sector.

Year	Nominee / work	Award	Result	Ref.
2006	herself	Most Outstanding New Independent Artist	Nominated	
2018	herself	Best Independent Artist	Won	
2018	Jen Cloher	Best Independent Album	Nominated	
2020	Dyson Stringer Cloher (as Dyson Stringer Cloher)	Best Independent Blues and Roots Album or EP	Nominated	
2023	"Mana Takatāpui"	Independent Song of the Year	Nominated	
2024	I Am the River, the River Is Me	Independent Album of the Year	Nominated	
2024	Jessia Searle – Jen Cloher - I Am The River, The River Is Me	Independent Publicity Team of the Year	Won	

=== APRA Awards ===
The APRA Awards are presented annually from 1982 by the Australasian Performing Right Association (APRA), "honouring composers and songwriters".

Year	Nominee / work	Award	Result	Ref.
2018	"Forgot Myself"	Song of the Year	Shortlisted	
2024	"Mana Takatāpui"	Song of the Year	Shortlisted	

=== ARIA Music Awards ===
The ARIA Music Awards is an annual awards ceremony that recognises excellence, innovation, and achievement across all genres of Australian music. Cloher has been nominated for two awards.

Year	Nominee / work	Award	Result	Ref.
2006	Dead Wood Falls	Best Female Artist	Nominated	
2023	I Am the River, the River Is Me	Best Solo Artist	Nominated	

=== Australian Music Prize ===
The Australian Music Prize (the AMP) is an annual award of $30,000 given to an Australian band or solo artist in recognition of the merit of an album released during the year of award. The commenced in 2005.

Year	Nominee / work	Award	Result
2013	In Bloody Memory	Australian Music Prize	Nominated
2017	Jen Cloher	Australian Music Prize	Nominated
2023	I Am the River, the River Is Me	Australian Music Prize	Nominated

=== Australian Women in Music Awards ===
The Australian Women in Music Awards is an annual event that celebrates outstanding women in the Australian Music Industry who have made significant and lasting contributions in their chosen field. They commenced in 2018.

Year	Nominee / work	Award	Result
2018	Jen Cloher	Music Leadership Award	Won

=== Environmental Music Prize ===
The Environmental Music Prize is a quest to find a theme song to inspire action on climate and conservation. It commenced in 2022.

Year	Nominee / work	Award	Result	Ref.
2023	"Being Human"	Environmental Music Prize	Nominated	

=== J Awards ===
The J Awards are an annual series of Australian music awards that were established by the Australian Broadcasting Corporation's youth-focused radio station Triple J. They commenced in 2005.

Year	Nominee / work	Award	Result	Ref.
2017	Jen Cloher	Double J Artist of the Year	Won	
2023	Jen Cloher	Double J Artist of the Year	Nominated	

=== Music Victoria Awards ===
The Music Victoria Awards is an annual awards ceremony celebrating Victorian music. Cloher has won one award form five nominations.

Year	Nominee / work	Award	Result	Ref.
2013	herself	Best Female Artist	Nominated	
2014	herself	Best Female Artist	Nominated	
2017	Jen Cloher	Best Album	Nominated	
2017	herself	Best Female Artist	Won	
2020	herself	Best Musician	Nominated	
2023	I Am the River, the River Is Me	Best Album	Nominated	
2023	herself	Best Solo Artist	Won	

=== National Live Music Awards ===
The National Live Music Awards (NLMAs) are a broad recognition of Australia's diverse live industry, celebrating the success of the Australian live scene. The awards commenced in 2016.

Year	Nominee / work	Award	Result	Ref.
2018	Jen Cloher	Live Guitarist of the Year	Nominated	
