= Australian Music Prize =

- Awarded for: Best Australian album
- Country: Australia
- First award: 2005
- Website: www.australianmusicprize.com.au

The Australian Music Prize (often shortened to the AMP) is an annual award of $50,000 ($30,000 from 2005 to 2023) given to an Australian band or solo artist in recognition of the merit of an album released during the year of award. The award was made by Australian Music Prize Ltd, a sole-purpose entity sponsored by a variety of music industry figures and record companies. The AMP was established in 2005.

Unlike the more mainstream ARIA Music Awards, the AMP aims to encourage Australian music of excellence – the prize's stated aim is to "financially reward and increase exposure for an Australian artist (or group of artists) who have produced and commercially released what specially appointed judges vote is the best contemporary music album in any one calendar year". In this sense, the AMP is broadly comparable to the UK's Mercury Music Prize.

The prize typically launches at the start of October each year and accepts entries (must be new Australian artist albums commercially released in that year) in October and November. A shortlist is announced the following February and then a winner at an event in Sydney in March.

In 2023, the nominations were revealed in late November with the award announcement scheduled for early December.

== Past winners and short list nominees ==
Year	Winner	Shortlisted nominees	Ref(s)
2005 (1st)	The Drones – Wait Long by the River and the Bodies of Your Enemies Will Float By	Ben Lee – Awake Is the New Sleep; The Devastations – Coal; The Go-Betweens – Oceans Apart; The Mess Hall – Notes From A Ceiling; Tex, Don and Charlie – All is Forgiven; TZU – Smiling at Strangers; Wolfmother – Wolfmother	
2006 (2nd)	Augie March – Moo, You Bloody Choir	Bob Evans – Suburban Songbook; Gotye – Like Drawing Blood; Howling Bells – Howling Bells; Jackie Marshall – Fight n'Flight; Lisa Gerrard – The Silver Tree; Sarah Blasko – What The Sea Wants, The Sea Will Have; The Drones – Gala Mill; The Grates – Gravity Won't Get You High	
2007 (3rd)	The Mess Hall – Devils Elbow	Architecture in Helsinki – Places Like This; Bluejuice – Problems; Dardanelles – Mirror Mirror; The Devastations – Yes U; Lisa Miller – Morning in the Bowl of Night; Midnight Juggernauts – Dystopia; New Buffalo – Somewhere, Anywhere; Perry Keyes – Last Ghost Train Home; Urthboy – The Signal	
2008 (4th)	Eddy Current Suppression Ring – Primary Colours	The Presets – Apocalypso; Beaches – Beaches; The Drones – Havilah; Cut Copy – In Ghost Colours; C. W. Stoneking – Jungle Blues; Jack Ladder – Love Is Gone; Tom Cooney – Presque Vu; Ross McLennan – For the New World	
2009 (5th)	Lisa Mitchell – Wonder	Bertie Blackman – Secrets and Lies; Black Cab – Call Signs; Kid Sam – Kid Sam; Lucie Thorne – Black Across the Field; Oh Mercy – Privileged Woes; Sarah Blasko – As Day Follows Night; The Mess Hall – For The Birds; Urthboy – Spitshine	
2010 (6th)	Cloud Control – Bliss Release	The Holidays – Post Paradise; Dan Kelly – Dan Kelly's Dream; Eddy Current Suppression Ring – Rush To Relax; Gareth Liddiard – Strange Tourist; Pikelet – Stem; Richard in Your Mind – My Volcano; Sally Seltmann – Heart That's Pounding; Tame Impala – Innerspeaker	
2011 (7th)	The Jezabels – Prisoner	Abbe May – Design Desire; Adalita – Adalita; Boy & Bear – Moonfire; Gotye – Making Mirrors; Gurrumul – Rrakala; Jack Ladder & the Dreamlanders – Hurtsville; Kimbra – Vows; The Middle East – I Want That You Are Always Happy	
2012 (8th)	Hermitude – HyperParadise	Flume – Flume; Tame Impala – Lonerism; The Presets – Pacifica; Grand Salvo – Slay Me in My Sleep; Jess Ribeiro & the Bone Collectors – My Little River; Liz Stringer – Warm in the Darkness; Daily Meds – Happy Daze; Urthboy – Smokey's Haunt	
2013 (9th)	Big Scary – Not Art	Jen Cloher – In Blood Memory; Dialectrix – The Cold Light of Day; Kirin J. Callinan – Embracism; Beaches – She Beats; Horrorshow – King Amongst Many; Jagwar Ma – Howlin'; Cloud Control – Dream Cave; Jimblah – Phoenix	
2014 (10th)	Remi – Raw x Infinity	#1 Dads – About Face; Blank Realm – Grassed Inn; C. W. Stoneking – Gon' Boogaloo; Caitlin Park – The Sleeper; Chet Faker – Built on Glass; Laura Jean – Laura Jean; The Peep Tempel – Tales; Total Control – Typical System	
2015 (11th)	Courtney Barnett – Sometimes I Sit and Think, and Sometimes I Just Sit	Dan Kelly – Leisure; Dick Diver – Melbourne, Florida; Gold Class – It's; Jess Ribeiro – Kill It Yourself; Methyl Ethel – Oh Inhuman Spectacle; My Disco – Severe; Royal Headache – High; Sarah Blasko – Eternal Return; Tame Impala – Currents	
2016 (12th)	A.B. Original – Reclaim Australia	The Avalanches – Wildflower; Big Scary – Animal; Camp Cope – Camp Cope; D.D Dumbo – Utopia Defeated; King Gizzard & the Lizard Wizard – Nonagon Infinity; Nick Cave & the Bad Seeds – Skeleton Tree; Olympia – Self Talk; The Peep Tempel – Joy	
2017 (13th)	Sampa the Great – Birds and the BEE9	Beaches – Second of Spring; Darcy Baylis – Intimacy & Isolation; HTMLflowers – Chrome Halo; Jen Cloher – Jen Cloher; Jordan Rakei – Wallflower; Liars – TFCF; Paul Kelly – Life Is Fine; The Vampires – The Vampires Meet Lionel Loueke	
2018 (14th)	Gurrumul – Djarimirri	Abbe May – Fruit; Courtney Barnett – Tell Me How You Really Feel; Dead Can Dance – Dionysus; Grand Salvo – Sea Glass; Laura Jean – Devotion; The Presets – Hi Viz; Rolling Blackouts Coastal Fever – Hope Downs; Sam Anning – Across A Field As Vast As One	
2019 (15th)	Sampa the Great – The Return	Ainslie Wills – All You Have Is All You Need; Amyl and the Sniffers – Amyl and the Sniffers; Dispossessed – Warpath Never Ended; Julia Jacklin – Crushing; Methyl Ethel – Triage; Nick Cave & the Bad Seeds – Ghosteen; Sleep D – Rebel Force; Thelma Plum – Better in Blak	
2020 (16th)	The Avalanches – We Will Always Love You	Alice Ivy – Don't Sleep; Blake Scott – Niscitam; Emma Donovan & the Putbacks – Crossover; Fanny Lumsden – Fallow; Gordon Koang – Unity; Miiesha – Nyaaringu; Tame Impala – The Slow Rush; Ziggy Ramo – Black Thoughts	
2021 (17th)	Genesis Owusu – Smiling with No Teeth	Amyl and the Sniffers – Comfort to Me; Baker Boy – Gela; Emma Donovan & the Putbacks – Under These Streets; Hiatus Kaiyote – Mood Valiant; King Gizzard & the Lizard Wizard – Butterfly 3000; Martha Marlow – Medicine Man; Nick Cave & Warren Ellis – Carnage; Odette – Herald	
2022 (18th)	King Stingray – King Stingray	1300 – Foreign Language; Body Type – Everything Is Dangerous but Nothing's Surprising; Camp Cope – Running with the Hurricane; Julia Jacklin – Pre Pleasure; Laura Jean – Amateurs; Party Dozen – The Real Work; Sampa The Great – As Above, So Below; Tasman Keith – A Colour Undone	
2023 (19th)	RVG – Brain Worms	Angie McMahon – Light, Dark, Light Again; Floodlights – Painting of My Time; Genesis Owusu – Struggler; Gretta Ray – Positive Spin; Jen Cloher – I Am the River, the River Is Me; Mo'Ju – Oro, Plata, Mata; Polaris – Fatalism; Troye Sivan – Something to Give Each Other	
2024 (20th)	Kankawa Nagarra – Wirlmarni	Audrey Powne – From the Fire; Amyl and the Sniffers – Cartoon Darkness; Dobby – Warrangu: River Story; Grace Cummings – Ramona; Hiatus Kaiyote – Love Heart Cheat Code; Nick Cave & The Bad Seeds – Wild God; Rowena Wise – Senseless Acts of Beauty; The Dirty Three – Love Changes Everything	
2025 (21st)	Ninajirachi – I Love My Computer	Bleak Squad – Strange Love; Divide and Dissolve – Insatiable; Floodlights – Underneath; Folk Bitch Trio – Now Would Be a Good Time; Mudrat – Social Cohesion; Mia Wray – Hi, It's Nice to Meet Me; Ruby Gill – Some Kind of Control; Tropical Fuck Storm – Fairyland Codex	
2026 (22nd)	Ecca Vandal – Looking for People to Unfollow	Baker Boy – Djandjay; Courtney Barnett – Creature of Habit; Genesis Owusu – Redstar Wu & the Worldwide Scourge; Georgia Knight – Beanpole; Grace Cummings – Bloodhorse!; Julia Jacklin – The Gem; Karnivool – In Verses; Swapmeet – Mount Zero	

== See also ==
- Choice Music Prize (Republic of Ireland and Northern Ireland)
- Mercury Prize (United Kingdom and the Republic of Ireland)
- Nordic Music Prize (Nordic countries)
- Polaris Music Prize (Canada)
- Prix Constantin (France)
- Shortlist Music Prize (United States)
