= Jen Cloher (album) =

Studio album by Jen Cloher
- Released: 11 August 2017
- Studio: The Bakery, Jumbunna, Victoria
- Length: 49:48
- Label: Milk! Records
- Producer: Greg Walker, Jen Cloher

Jen Cloher chronology
| Dyson, Stringer & Cloher (2013) | Jen Cloher (2017) | B Sides and Rarities (2018) |

Singles from Jen Cloher
- 1. "Forgot Myself" Released: June 2017; 2. "Regional Echo" Released: July 2017; 3. "Strong Woman" Released: October 2017

Jen Cloher is the fourth studio album by Australian musician Jen Cloher. It was released in August 2017 under Milk! Records and peaked at number 5 on the ARIA Charts.

== Reception ==
Junkee said the album was, "the magnum opus of one of our finest Australian poets. The 11 songs contained within know exactly what they want to say, and exactly how they’re going to say it, no more so than "Regional Echo". A lament about the state of Australian suburbs that slowly shifts into a love letter dedicated to future possibility, it's a melancholy masterpiece."

Spectrum Culture said, "With lashes of punk grit and glimmers of shoegaze buoyed by politically and emotionally engaged lyrics, Jen Cloher has all of the makings of being one of the more notable indie rock releases of the year.""

== Accolades ==
Professional ratings
Review scores
| Source | Rating |
|---|---|
| Loud and Quiet | 7/10 |
| Spectrum Culture | 4/5 stars |

| Publication | Accolade | Rank | Ref. |
|---|---|---|---|
| Double J | Top 50 Albums of 2017 | 1 | |
| Drowned in Sound | Top 100 Albums of 2017 | 66 | |
| Norman Records | Top 50 Albums of 2017 | 27 | |
| The Sydney Morning Herald | Top 20 Albums of 2017 | N/A | |

== Track listing ==
All tracks are written by Jen Cloher.

| No. | Title | Length |
|---|---|---|
| 1. | "Forgot Myself" | 4:23 |
| 2. | "Analysis Paralysis" | 7:45 |
| 3. | "Regional Echo" | 5:42 |
| 4. | "Sensory Memory" | 3:42 |
| 5. | "Shoegazers" | 3:46 |
| 6. | "Strong Woman" | 2:58 |
| 7. | "Kinda Biblical" | 3:51 |
| 8. | "Great Australian Bite" | 4:41 |
| 9. | "Loose Magic" | 5:44 |
| 10. | "Waiting in the Wings" | 5:01 |
| 11. | "Dark Art" | 2:15 |

== Charts ==
| Chart | Peak position |
|---|---|
| Australian Albums (ARIA) | 5 |

== Release history ==
| Region | Date | Format | Label | Catalogue |
|---|---|---|---|---|
| Australia | 11 August 2017 | CD; digital download; streaming; LP | Milk! Records | MILK025 |
