= Remi (band) =

Australian hip hop duo

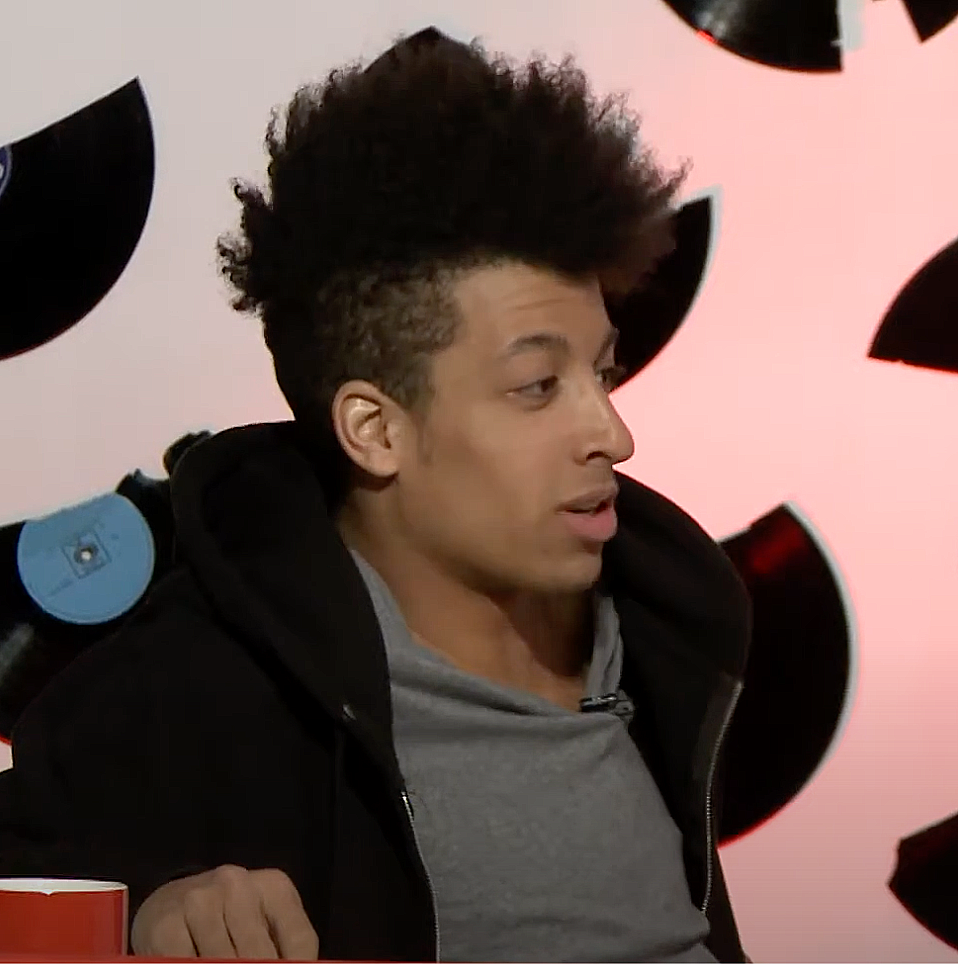
- Remi Kolawole in December 2013

Background information
- Origin: Melbourne, Victoria, Australia
- Genre: Australian hip hop
- Years active: 2011–2021
- Labels: House of Beige; Warner; Jakarta
- Past members: Remi Kolawole; Daniel "Dutch" Siwes; Justin "Sensible J" Smith
- Website: remikolawole.com

Remi (stylised in all caps) was an Australian hip hop duo consisting of rapper Remi Kolawole and producer Justin "Sensible J" Smith. Originally a trio, which included producer-engineer Daniel "Dutch" Siwes, the group released four full-length albums as well as two mix-tapes and four extended plays (EPs). Remi's 2014 release Raw x Infinity garnered critical acclaim, winning the Australian Music Prize, while its third album Divas & Demons (2016)—Remi's first as a duo—was nominated for the 2017 ARIA Award for Best Urban Album. The act's final album, Fried (May 2021), coincided with the dissolution of Remi.

== History ==
Remi was formed in Melbourne as a three-piece by Aderemi Matthew "Remi" Kolawole on lead vocals, Daniel James "Dutch" Siwes on co-production and engineering and Justin Scott "Sensible J" Smith on drums and production. Kolawole was born in Canberra to a Tasmanian mother and Nigerian father. He took classical piano lessons while growing up and started rapping on a dare from a friend. Siwes and Smith were neighbours and jammed in various bands in the late 1990s. The pair mentored Kolawole early in his solo career.

The trio's first recordings appeared in 2011, "Apollo 13" and "Ape", as free downloads through Kolawole's Bandcamp page. "Ape" was also the lead single from Remi's first album, Regular People Shit, which was self-released via House of Beige in 2012. "Ape" received high rotation on national youth radio station, Triple J. Remi's 2013 singles, "Sangria" and "Saggin" from the trio's mix-tape F.Y.G. Act 1, also gained consistent radio airplay, contributing to Remi winning that year's Triple J Unearthed Artist of the Year award.

The trio's second album, Raw x Infinity, was released in June 2014 to critical acclaim. Backed by the singles "Livin" and "Tyson"—the latter a boastful nod to boxer Mike Tyson—the release was nominated for Australian Album of the Year in the J Awards of 2014. In March 2015, Remi was awarded the coveted $30,000 Australian Music Prize for Raw x Infinity, adding to the record's growing list of accolades.

Slimming to a duo in 2016, Kolawole and Smith released Divas & Demons, Remi's third album, which peaked in the top 10 of the ARIA Charts. The following year, the record was nominated for the 2017 ARIA Award for Best Urban Album.

The duo's final album, Fried, was released in May 2021 after being postponed for more than a year due to the COVID-19 pandemic in Australia. The pair also announced their split during the week of the album's release.

== Discography ==
=== Studio albums ===
List of studio albums, with release date, label, and selected chart positions shown
Title	Album details	Peak chart positions
Title	Album details	AUS
Regular People Shit	Released: 11 January 2012; Label: House of Beige; Formats: CD, digital download	–
Raw x Infinity	Released: 25 July 2014; Label: House of Beige, Warner; Format: CD, LP, digital download	29
Divas & Demons	Released: 16 September 2016; Label: House of Beige, Warner; Format: CD, LP, digital download, streaming	10
Fried	Released: 7 May 2021; Label: House of Beige, Jakarta; Format: CD, LP, digital download, streaming	–

=== Extended plays ===
List of EPs, with release date and label shown
Title	Details
Childish (as Remi 'Remi.' Kolawole)	Released: 17 August 2011; Label: House of Beige; Format: Digital download
Five Beats I Love (as Remi 'Remi.' Kolawole)	Released: 10 October 2011; Label: House of Beige; Format: Digital download
Black Hole Sun (with Raiza Biza)	Released: 30 November 2018; Label: Low Key Source, House of Beige; Format: 12" vinyl, digital download, streaming
Live at the Secret Creek	Released: 26 December 2019; Label: House of Beige; Format: Digital download, streaming

=== Mixtapes ===
List of mixtapes, with release date and label shown
Title	Details
F.Y.G. Act:1	Released: 12 June 2013; Label: House of Beige; Format: Digital download
Call It What You Want (F.Y.G. Act:2)	Released: 14 May 2015; Label: House of Beige; Format: CD, digital download

=== Singles ===
List of singles, with year released and album name shown
Title	Year	Album
"Ape"	2011	Regular People Shit
"Rock Ish Remix"	2012	
"Sangria"	2013	F.Y.G. Act:1
"Saggin"	2013	F.Y.G. Act:1
"Livin"	2014	Raw x Infinity
"Tyson"	2014	Raw x Infinity
"XTC Party"	2014	Raw x Infinity
"Ode to Ignorance"	2015	Raw x Infinity
"For Good" (featuring Sampa the Great)	2016	Divas & Demons
"Substance Therapy"	2016	Divas & Demons
"Lose Sleep" (featuring Jordan Rakei)	2016	Divas & Demons
"My People" (featuring Thando)	2018	Non-album single
"Runner" (with Raiza Biza featuring Baro)	2018	Black Hole Sun
"5 A.M." (featuring Whosane)	2019	Fried
"Brain" (featuring Lori)	2019	Fried
"Elevate"	2020	Fried
"Get It Right" (featuring Jace XL)	2020	Fried
"Left a Note (No Master)"	2021	Non-album single

=== Music videos ===
List of music videos, showing year released and directors
Title	Year	Director(s)
"Ape"	2012	Ollie Cole
"Sangria"	2013	Jarvis Hunder and Michelle Grace Hunder
"Saggin"	2013	Jarvis Hunder and Michelle Grace Hunder
"Livin"	2014	Michelle Grace Hunder
"Tyson"	2014	Nic McRobbie
"XTC Party"	2014	Remi Kolawole and Bé Price
"Ode to Ignorance"	2015	Jam Nawaz
"For Good"	2016	James Ruse
"Substance Therapy"	2016	Jam Nawaz
"Lose Sleep"	2016	Jam Nawaz
"My People"	2018	Baz Richie and Harry Deadman
"Runner"	2018	Tig Terera
"5 A.M."	2019	Barun Chatterjee
"Brain"	2019	Barun Chatterjee

== Awards and nominations ==
=== AIR Awards ===
The Australian Independent Record Awards (commonly known informally as AIR Awards) is an annual awards night to recognise, promote and celebrate the success of Australia's Independent Music sector.

Year	Nominee / work	Award	Result	Ref.
2014	Raw X Infinity	Best Independent Hip Hop/Urban Album	Won	
2014	themselves	Breakthrough Independent Artist	Nominated	
2014	themselves	Carlton Dry Global Music Grant	Won	
2017	Divas and Demons	Best Independent Hip Hop/Urban Album	Nominated	

=== Australian Music Prize ===
The Australian Music Prize (the AMP) is an annual award of $30,000 given to an Australian band or solo artist in recognition of the merit of an album released during the year of award.

Year	Nominee / work	Award	Result	Ref.
2014	Raw X Infinity	Australian Music Prize	Won	

=== ARIA Music Awards ===
The Australian Recording Industry Association Music Awards (commonly known informally as ARIA Music Awards or ARIA Awards) is an annual series of awards nights celebrating the Australian music industry, put on by the Australian Recording Industry Association (ARIA)

Year	Nominee / work	Award	Result	Ref.
2017	Divas & Demons	Best Urban Album	Nominated	

=== J Awards ===
The J Awards are an annual series of Australian music awards that were established by the Australian Broadcasting Corporation's youth-focused radio station Triple J. They commenced in 2005.

Year	Nominee / work	Award	Result	Ref.
2013	themselves	Unearthed Artist of the Year	Won	
2014	Raw X Infinity	Australian Album of the Year	Nominated	

=== BET Awards ===
The BET Awards is an American award show that was established in 2001 by the Black Entertainment Television network to celebrate black entertainers and other minorities in music, film, sports and philanthropy.

Year	Nominee / work	Award	Result	Ref.
2017	Remi	International Viewers' Choice Award	Nominated	

=== Music Victoria Awards ===
The Music Victoria Awards, are an annual awards night celebrating Victorian music. They commenced in 2005.

Year	Nominee / work	Award	Result	Ref.
2014	himself	Best Emerging Artist	Won	
2014	Raw x Infinity	Best Hip Hop Album	Nominated	
2016	himself	Best Male Artist	Nominated	
2017	himself	Best Male Artist	Nominated	
2017	Divas & Demons	Best Hip Hop Album	Nominated	
2019	himself	Best Hip Hop Act	Nominated	

=== National Live Music Awards ===
The National Live Music Awards (NLMAs) are a broad recognition of Australia's diverse live industry, celebrating the success of the Australian live scene. The awards commenced in 2016.

Year	Nominee / work	Award	Result	Ref.
2016	Remi	Live Hip Hop Act of the Year	Nominated	
