= Looking for People to Unfollow =

Studio album by Ecca Vandal
- Released: 22 May 2026
- Studio: Richie Buxton's home (Melbourne)
- Length: 41:47
- Label: Loma Vista
- Producers: Ecca Vandal; Richie Buxton

Ecca Vandal chronology
Ecca Vandal (2017)	Looking for People to Unfollow (2026)

Singles from Looking for People to Unfollow
- 1. "Bleed But Never Die" Released: 8 August 2024; 2. "Then There's One" Released: 22 November 2024; 3. "Cruising to Self Soothe" Released: 26 February 2025; 4. "Molly" Released: 13 November 2025; 5. "Bleach" Released: 4 February 2026; 6. "Sorry! Crash!" Released: 1 April 2026; 7. "Vertical Worlds" Released: 19 May 2026

Professional ratings
Aggregate scores
Source	Rating
Metacritic	79/100
Review scores
Source	Rating
The Australian	3.5/5 stars
Clash	8/10
DIY	3.5/5 stars
Metal Hammer	4/5 stars
NME	4/5 stars
Pitchfork	7.5/10

Looking for People to Unfollow is the second studio album by Ecca Vandal, released on 22 May 2026 through Loma Vista Recordings.

At the 2026 ARIA Music Awards it won Best Alternative Release, Best Cover Art and Michael Gudinski Breakthrough Artist and was also nominated for Album of the Year and Best Solo Artist. At the 2026 J Awards, the album was nominated for Australian Album of the Year.

The album won the 2026 Australian Music Prize.

== Track listing ==
All tracks are written by Ecca Vandal and Richie Buxton, except "Bleed but Never Die", co-written with Shungudzo Kuyimba.

No.	Title	Length
1.	"Airplane Mode"	0:44
2.	"Eyes Shut"	2:33
3.	"Sorry! Crash!"	3:09
4.	"Vertical Worlds"	3:15
5.	"Bleed but Never Die"	2:50
6.	"Cruising to Self Soothe"	2:30
7.	"Molly"	4:20
8.	"Okay Not to Be Okay"	2:07
9.	"Levitate Part 1+2"	3:42
10.	"Looking for People to Unfollow"	0:40
11.	"Then There's One"	1:16
12.	"Bleach"	2:28
13.	"Did a Little More to Forget"	0:54
14.	"Do It Anyway"	3:02
15.	"Dance in Debt"	0:33
16.	"Ghosts"	3:21
17.	"Came Here for the Loot"	4:13
Total length:		41:47

== Personnel ==
Credits are adapted from Tidal.

- Ecca Vandal – vocals, production, engineering (all tracks); mixing (tracks 1–4, 6–10, 13–16), piano (2, 13), synthesizer (2, 3, 7, 12), Rhodes (3, 7)
- Richie Buxton – production, engineering, mixing (all tracks); bass guitar (1–4, 6, 7, 15–17), keyboards (1), drum programming (2–4, 6–10, 12, 13, 16, 17), guitar (2–4, 6, 7, 12, 15, 17), synthesizer (2–4, 7–10, 12–14, 16, 17), piano (2), percussion (3, 4, 7–10, 13, 14, 16, 17), Rhodes (3, 7), drums (12)
- Ryan Smith – mastering
- Hadyn Buxton – additional mixing (1–4, 6–10, 12–17)
- Jason Lader – additional mixing (2, 6)
- Dani Perez – additional engineering (1–4, 7–10, 13–17)
- Michael Deano – additional engineering (1–4, 7–10, 13–17)

== Charts ==
Chart performance for Looking for People to Unfollow
Chart (2026)	Peak position
Australian Albums (ARIA)	12
French Physical Albums (SNEP)	117
French Rock & Metal Albums (SNEP)	51
Scottish Albums (Official Charts)	68
UK Albums Sales (Official Charts)	67
US Top Album Sales (Billboard)	43

== Release history ==
Release history for Looking for People to Unfollow
Region	Label	Format	Date	Ref.
Various	Loma Vista	Digital download, streaming	22 May 2026	
Various	Loma Vista	CD; CS; LP	4 September 2026	
