= I Am the River, the River Is Me =

Studio album by Jen Cloher
- Released: 3 March 2023
- Studios: New Zealand and Melbourne, Australia
- Length: 41:15
- Label: Milk!
- Producers: Tom Healy; Anika Ostendorf; Jen Sholakis

Jen Cloher chronology
Dyson, Stringer Cloher (2019)	I Am the River, the River Is Me (2023)

Singles from I Am the River, the River Is Me
- 1. "Mana Takatâpui" Released: 9 November 2022; 2. "Being Human" Released: 1 December 2022; 3. "My Witch" Released: 1 February 2023; 4. "Harakeke" Released: 3 March 2023

I Am the River, the River Is Me (in te reo Māori Ko Au Te Awa, Ko Te Awa Ko Au) is the fifth studio album by Australian musician Jen Cloher. The album was recorded between New Zealand and Melbourne, Australia and is Cloher's first to feature songs sung in both English and te reo Māori, as well as a joint te reo Māori and English title.

I Am the River, the River Is Me was announced in November 2022 and released on 3 March 2023 via Milk! Records. The album was supported by an Australian tour, commencing in Perth on 6 May 2023 before heading to Europe in June 2023 and concluding in New Zealand in July 2023.

At the 2023 Music Victoria Awards, the album was nominated for Best Album.

At the 2023 ARIA Music Awards, the album earned Cloher a nomination for Best Solo Artist.

The album was nominated for the 2023 Australian Music Prize.

At the AIR Awards of 2024, the album was nominated for Independent Album of the Year while the album was nominated for Independent Publicity Team of the Year.

== Reception ==
Professional ratings
Review scores
Source	Rating
Back Seat Mafia	9/10
The Sydney Morning Herald	4.5/5 stars

Giselle Au-Nhien Nguyen of Sydney Morning Herald said "Sonically, the record leans into a folksy palette that brings to mind Cloher's earlier work" saying, I Am the River, the River Is Me reads like a love letter to many things: heritage, queerness, oneself. Cloher is one of Australia's finest songwriters, one who takes time between releases and produces music that is in equal parts contemplative and joyful. This is a special record that pays tribute to the past and the future, blending the personal and the political and showing that everything is interconnected".

Deb Pelser of Back Seat Mafia said "This album is all encompassing – it spans the personal, the exploration of their Māori heritage and is also a commentary on our recent political situation, all delivered in a collection of astute songs that are superbly produced and lushly orchestrated." Pelser added "Despite the undeniable tension that must have pervaded the genesis of these songs, Cloher's confident delivery, backed by some fine musicians, results in an album that is upbeat, hopeful and simply beautiful. Whilst it documents Cloher's personal quest it has universal themes that will resonate widely".

Bryget Chrisfield of Beat Magazine said "Many of I Am the River, the River Is Me's songs flow with a sense of curious self-discovery, while others challenge: like initiating difficult convos and welcoming discomfort as an opportunity for personal growth."

Double J rated it the fifth best album of the year, saying, "this is the first time Jen sings in both English and te reo Māori. It is beautiful, the ease of their delivery feels like a warm hug. It's political too — there is strength and knowledge in every lyric.

== Track listing ==
I Am the River, the River Is Me track listing
No.	Title	Length
1.	"Mana Takatâpui"	4:26
2.	"Harakeke"	4:22
3.	"My Witch"	2:45
4.	"Being Human"	3:25
5.	"I Am the River, the River Is Me"	5:41
6.	"Protest Song"	5:29
7.	"The Wild"	4:02
8.	"Aroha Mai, Aroha Atu"	3:20
9.	"He Toka - Tu - Moana" (featuring Te Kaahu)	2:24
10.	"I Am Coming Home"	5:21
Total length:		41:15

== Charts ==
Chart performance for I Am the River, the River Is Me
Chart (2023)	Peak position
Australian Albums (ARIA)	30

== Release history ==
Release history and formats for I Am the River, the River Is Me
Region	Date	Format	Label	Catalogue
Australia	3 March 2023	CD; digital download; streaming; LP	Milk!	MILK070CD / MILK070LP
