= Never Forget (Sampa the Great song) =

2022 song by Sampa the Great

Single by Sampa the Great featuring Chef 187, Tio Nason, and Mwanjé

from the album As Above So Below
- Released: 29 June 2022
- Recorded: 2022
- Genre: Zamrock; hip hop
- Length: 3:37
- Songwriters: Kondwani Kaira; Magnus Mando; Mwanje Tembo; Sampa Tembo; Taonga Nyirongo
- Producers: Mag44; Blazer

Sampa the Great singles chronology
| "Lane" (2022) | "Never Forget" (2022) | "Let Me Be Great" (2022) |

Music video
- "Never Forget" on YouTube

Never Forget is a song by Zambian singer and rapper Sampa the Great featuring fellow Zambian rapper Chef 187 and fellow Zambian singers Tio Nason & Mwanjé. It was released on June 29, 2022, as the third single from the former's second studio album As Above, So Below.

== Background and style ==
Sampa describes 'Never Forget' as 'a ballad' to Zamrock; a genre that emerged in Zambia in the 1970s. It is a fusion of Kalindula and Psychedelic rock.

== Composition ==
Sampa composed the first and third verse of the song while Chef 187 composed the second verse. The song features a bridge which was written by Sampa's sister Mwanjé and a chorus written by Sampa's cousin Tio Nason.

== Music video ==
The song's music video was released on Sampa's YouTube channel on 28 June 2022. The video was directed by Rharha Nembhard, Imraan Christian, and Furmaan Ahmed. Nembhard disclosed that the idea of time came across her thoughts as soon as she listened to the song, this inspired her and other directors to have the video exhibit the past, present, and future simultaneously. Archival footage of Kenneth Kaunda giving a speech and Paul Ngozi performing are among the footage used in the video to show the cultures of early Zambia.

== Usage in media ==
The song was used in one of the trailers for the Marvel Cinematic Universe film Black Panther: Wakanda Forever.
