= A Fool Who'll =

Studio album by Laura Jean
- Released: 29 August 2011
- Studio: Headgap, Dollhouse
- Genre: Folk
- Length: 44:48
- Label: Chapter
- Producer: Simon Grounds

Laura Jean chronology
| Eden Land (2008) | A Fool Who'll (2011) | Laura Jean (2014) |

A Fool Who'll is the third album by Australian folk singer-songwriter Laura Jean. It was released on 29 August 2011 via Chapter Music.

== Reception ==
Professional ratings
Review scores
| Source | Rating |
|---|---|
| The Age | 4/5 stars |
| The Sydney Morning Herald | 4/5 stars |

Samantha Allemann for ArtsHub Australia, rated A Fool Who'll as five-out-of-five stars and explained, "[it] succeeds in putting together nine songs which are interestingly diverse, yet all equally strong. There's no filler, and that is something quite rare indeed. Laura Jean's gorgeous voice and strong range is well matched by her band and their new electric approach, resulting in an album that's both dynamic and sweet."

The Sydney Morning Herald's Bernard Zuel noticed that Jean, "does not fear intimacy", as the album is, "dominated by the mix of emotion that comes with falling in love." She shows, "The thrill of love is definitely there... but so is its travelling partner in any love affair: the fear of losing that love."

Melbourne's radio station 3RRR's staff listed it as their Album of the Week on 29 August 2011, with the summary, "[it] offers the understated but captivating style of previous recordings, and imbues its songs with elements of disquiet, and dissonance... [it] reflects an evolution in [her] sound and approach. Incorporating new sounds."

== Track listing ==
(All tracks by Laura Jean Englert)

1. "So Happy" – 3:32
2. "Missing You" – 4:54
3. "Valenteen" – 4:06
4. "Noël" – 5:30
5. "Spring" – 6:13
6. "Marry Me" – 5:34
7. "Australia" – 5:36
8. "My Song" – 4:00
9. "All Along" – 4:52

== Personnel ==
Laura Jean Trio

- Biddy Connor – viola, piano accordion, Casio SK1, vocals, string arrangements ("Spring", "My Song")
- Laura Jean Englert – vocals, guitars (acoustic, bass, electric), saxophone
- Jen Sholakis – drums, guitars (acoustic, electric), vocals

Additional musicians

- Zoe Barry – cello ("Spring", "Marry Me", "My Song")
- Isobel Knowles – trumpet ("Australia")
- Martin Mackerras – clarinet ("Valenteen", "Marry Me")
- Paddy Mann – vocals ("Spring")
- Steph O'Hara – violin ("Spring", "Marry Me", "My Song")
- Jojo Petrina – vocals ("My Song")
- Monica Sonand – vocals ("My Song")
- Andrea Sumner – violin ("Noël", "All Along")

Recording details

- Simon Grounds – producer, audio engineer; at Headgap and Dollhouse studios
- Peter J Moore – mastering
- Darryl Neudorf – mixer at Operation Northwoods studio

Art works

- Laura Jean Englert – design
- Isobel Knowles – design
- Karl Scullin – photography, design
