= As Above, So Below (Sampa the Great album) =

Studio album by Sampa the Great
- Released: 9 September 2022
- Recorded: Zambia
- Length: 39:08
- Label: Loma Vista
- Producers: Blazer; Dreamlife; Jeff Kleinman; Mag44; Solomon "Plate" Moyo; Powers Pleasant; Mason Sacks; Sampa the Great

Sampa the Great chronology
The Return (2019)	As Above, So Below (2022)	Nu Zamrock (2026)

Singles from As Above, So Below
- 1. "Lane" Released: 29 April 2022; 2. "Never Forget" Released: 29 June 2022; 3. "Bona" Released: 28 July 2022; 4. "Let Me Be Great" Released: 9 September 2022

As Above, So Below is the second studio album by Zambian singer-songwriter and rapper Sampa the Great, released on 9 September 2022 through Loma Vista Recordings. The album was recorded in Zambia after Sampa the Great relocated there from Australia during the COVID-19 pandemic, and was announced in June 2022 alongside the release of the second single. As Above, So Below peaked at number 12 on the ARIA Charts.

In a statement accompanying the album's release, Sampa the Great said "After years of feeling like I had to represent and be an ambassador for everyone, I finally feel like I get to be an ambassador and fully represent myself."

The album was nominated for Australian Album of the Year at the 2022 J Awards.

The album was nominated for the 2022 Australian Music Prize.

A deluxe version was released in May 2023, featuring 7 live tracks.

== Reception ==
Professional ratings
Aggregate scores
Source	Rating
Metacritic	79/100
Review scores
Source	Rating
AllMusic	3.5/5 stars
Clash	8/10
Exclaim!	8/10
The Guardian	4/5 stars
NME	4/5 stars
Pitchfork	6.8/10

Paul Simpson from AllMusic said "As Above, So Below takes influence from past and present styles of music from Zambia, Botswana (where Sampa was raised) and South Africa, sounding organic and earthy yet thoroughly contemporary. A much more concise record than the sprawling, jazzy The Return, As Above similarly celebrates heritage and culture while looking inward and discussing personal issues."

Kish Lal from The Guardian wrote, "Tied together by a desire for authenticity and marked by a ferocious culmination of frustration and self-actualisation, As Above, So Below is Tembo's most cohesive body of work yet." Lal concluded the review with "The underlying thesis of As Above, So Below is the revolutionary act of self-love, which is distilled in 'Let Me Be Great', featuring the Beninese singer Angeliqué Kidjo. A bright tangle of horns and soaring vocals from Kidjo is an emotional, full-circle moment teeming with mutual respect from one start to another."

Kyann-Sian Williams from NME said "The record is a heartfelt, honest homage to a country and continent, created by a powerful, unapologetic artist. This intelligent, harmonious and compelling album shows just how much Sampa the Great has grown over her years in the limelight."

James Mellen from Clash said "The beautiful blends of genres and crisp production make As Above, So Below an enthralling listen, and has Sampa raising the bar for herself once again."

Antoine-Samuel Mauffette Alavo from Exclaim! opined that "As Above, So Below signifies a transition in [Sampa the Great's] musical journey and an expansion of her creative palette. Sampa navigates the dichotomy of an African artist presenting traditional sounds to a Western audience. The rapper expertly interrogates the exoticist gaze and industry expectations while reconnecting to African soundscapes."

Stephen Kearse from Pitchfork found that "Sampa folds zamrock, polyrhythmic percussion and choral harmonies into her roving music. Though her rapping remains impersonal, she sounds renewed on these homegrown songs, the anxiety of her past music replaced with relief." Kearse added "The album is leaner and punchier than its restless predecessor, trading winding verses and interludes for streamlined songs of celebration... the songs prioritise rhythm and groove with a mix of live instrumentation and buoyant drum programming."

Double J said "While there have been some significant changes for album number two, plenty remains the same. Most notably, Sampa Tembo's raw skills as a lyricist and rapper. She spits with a confidence, clarity and passion that sounds genuinely inextinguishable across the album. As if she's never had more to say and never felt more comfortable saying it." In their 50 best albums of the year list, Double J placed As Above, So Below at 7th.

== Track listing ==
As Above, So Below track listing
No.	Title	Writer(s)	Producer(s)	Length
1.	"Shadows"	Sampa Tembo; Magnus Mando	Mag44	4:19
2.	"Lane" (with Denzel Curry and Powers Pleasant)	S. Tembo; Denzel Curry; Jeff Kleinman; Powers Pleasant; Mason Sacks	Kleinman; Pleasant; Sacks; Solomon "Plate" Moyo	2:42
3.	"Never Forget" (with Chef 187, Mwané, and Tio Nason)	S. Tembo; Kondwani Kaira; Mando; Taonga Nyirongo; Mwanjé Tembo	Mag44; Blazer	3:37
4.	"Mask On" (with Joey Badass)	S. Tembo; Mando; Moyo; Jo-Vaugh Scott	Mag44; Moyo; Sampa the Great	2:52
5.	"Bona"	S. Tembo; Mando	Mag44; Sampa the Great	2:40
6.	"Can I Live?" (with Witch)	S. Tembo; Emmanuel Chanda; Mando	Mag44; Blazer	4:14
7.	"Imposter Syndrome" (with James Sakala)	S. Tembo; Mando; Samuel Nyambe; James Sakala	Mag44; Sampa the Great	4:17
8.	"Tilibobo"	S. Tembo; Mando; Moyo	Mag44; Moyo	3:04
9.	"Lo Rain" (with Mwanjé)	S. Tembo; Dreamlife; Pleasant; M. Tembo	Mag44; Pleasant; Dreamlife	3:32
10.	"IDGAF" (with Kojey Radical)	S. Tembo; Kwadwo Amponsah; Mando	Mag44; Sampa the Great	4:08
11.	"Let Me Be Great" (with Angélique Kidjo)	S. Tembo; Angélique Kidjo; Mando; Samuel Masta	Mag44	3:54
Total length:				39:08

Deluxe edition (Live from Lusaka)
No.	Title	Writer(s)	Producer(s)	Length
12.	"Shadows" (featuring Gabbi Chansa Lamba and iMitundy Choir)	S. Tembo; Mando	Agripa Bwalya; Collins Sikwese; Ian Wabu; Kelvin Chipoya; Mark Simwanza; Peter Ngoma	4:57
13.	"Imposter Syndrome" (featuring James Sakala and iMitundu Choir)	S. Tembo; Mando; Nyambe; Salaka	Bwalya; Sikwese; Wabu; Chipoya; Simwanza; Ngoma	4:36
14.	"Can I Live?"	S. Tembo; Chanda; Mando	Bwalya; Sikwese; Wabu; Chipoya; Simwanza; Ngoma	4:20
15.	"Mask On" (featuring Natasha Chansa)	S. Tembo; Mando; Moyo; Virginie	Bwalya; Sikwese; Wabu; Chipoya; Simwanza; Ngoma	3:07
16.	"Never Forget" (featuring Chef 187, Tio Nason, Mwanjé, and Nomankanjani)	S. Tembo; Kaira; Mando; Nyirongo; M. Tembo	Bwalya; Sikwese; Wabu; Chipoya; Simwanza; Ngoma	3:57
17.	"Tilibobo" (featuring Mag44 and Solomon Plate)	S. Tembo; Mando; Moyo	Bwalya; Sikwese; Wabu; Chipoya; Simwanza; Ngoma	4:52
18.	"Lo Rain" (featuring Mwanjé)	S. Tembo; Dreamlife; Pleasant; M. Tembo	Bwalya; Sikwese; Wabu; Chipoya; Simwanza; Ngoma	6:42

== Personnel ==
Musicians

- Sampa Tembo – vocals
- Mwanjé – additional vocals (tracks 1, 2, 5, 8, 10, 11), vocals (3, 9), background vocals (12)
- Mag44 – drum programming (1, 3–11), additional vocals (4, 8, 10)
- Sammy Masta – guitar (1, 3–6, 8–12), additional vocals (4, 10), vocals (11)
- Samuel Nyambe – keyboards (1, 3–6, 8–11), additional vocals (4, 7, 10)
- Mufrika – piano (1)
- Gabby Chansa Lamba – spoken word (1)
- Amadou Suso – strings (1)
- Tio Nason – additional vocals (2, 11), vocals (3), background vocals (12)
- Solomon Plate – drum programming (2, 4), additional vocals (4)
- Denzel Curry – vocals (2)
- Joshua Lungu – African percussion (3)
- Philip Ngoma – African percussion (3)
- Chef 187 – vocals (3)
- Joey Badass – vocals (4)
- Kalukusha Nkole Gibson – bass guitar (6)
- James Sakala – vocals, guitar (7)
- Dreamlife – drum programming (9)
- Powers Pleasant – drum programming (9)
- Kojey Radical – vocals (10)
- Arthur Kabaso Seba – saxophone (11)
- Angélique Kidjo – vocals (11)
- Kunda Nyenda – alto (12–18)
- Lysa Phiri – alto (12–18)
- Lazarus Lalo Zulu – keyboards (12–18)
- Sarah Katai – soprano (12–18)
- Wendy Mvula – soprano (12–18)
- Bartholomew Chilufya Chimbwa – tenor (12–18)
- Evans Mulwe – tenor (12–18)
- Kasonde "Tek1" Sunkutu – drums (12–18)

Technical

- Mike Bozzi – mastering (1–11)
- Ruairi O'Flaherty – mastering (12–18)
- Neal H Pogue – mixing (1–11)
- Nathan Burgess – mixing (12–18), engineering (2)
- Powers Pleasant – mixing (2)
- Ben "Blazer" Kalul – engineering (1, 2, 4, 5, 7–18)
- Ezekiel Nyimbili – engineering (1)
- Sidney Muyamba – engineering (1)
- Maleho Makgothi – engineering (2, 9)
- Juan "Saucy" Pena – engineering (4)
- Dave Holmes – engineering (10)
- Jean Hebrail – engineering (11)
- Mapalo Manda – engineering assistance (12–18)

Visuals

- Christopher Leckie – package design
- Imraan Christian – photography

== Charts ==
Chart performance for As Above, So Below
Chart (2022)	Peak position
Australian Albums (ARIA)	12

== Release history ==
Region	Date	Version	Format	Label	Catalogue
Various	18 November 2022	Standard	CD, digital download, 2x LP, streaming	Loma Vista	LVR02896
Australia	12 May 2023	Deluxe	digital download, streaming	Loma Vista	—N/a
