= Ecca Vandal (album) =

2017 album by Ecca Vandal

Studio album by Ecca Vandal
- Released: 20 October 2017
- Recorded: 2017
- Genres: Alternative rock; indie pop; hip hop; alternative punk; soul
- Length: 44:56
- Label: Dew Process
- Producers: Ecca Vandal; Richard "Kidnot" Buxton

Ecca Vandal chronology
Ecca Vandal (2017)	Looking for People to Unfollow (2026)

Singles from Ecca Vandal
- 1. "Broke Days, Party Nights" Released: 28 July 2017; 2. "Future Heroine" Released: 22 September 2017; 3. "Price of Living" Released: 13 October 2017

Ecca Vandal is the debut studio album by Australian rapper Ecca Vandal, released on 20 October 2017 by Dew Process. It was co-produced by Vandal and Kidnot, it also featured extra vocals from Dennis Lyxzén, Jason Aalon Butler, and local talent Sampa the Great.

== Promotion ==
On 28 September 2017, Ecca Vandal announced the release date of her debut album and a 10-date national tour for it going from 3–25 November. Across Australia she performed her album in Fremantle, Adelaide, Newcastle, Sydney, Wollongong, Gold Coast, Coolum, Brisbane, Ballarat, and finished in her hometown of Melbourne. In December, she made her UK tour debut supporting Frank Carter & The Rattlesnakes performing in Bristol, Birmingham, Manchester, Glasgow, Nottingham, Norwich, London. She then returned home to perform at the 2017 Falls Music & Arts Festival in Lorne, Marion Bay, Byron Bay, and Fremantle again.

== Writing and composition ==
All songs were written and co-produced by Vandal and Kidnot, she collaborated with Dennis Lyxzén of Refused, Jason Aalon Butler of Letlive, and local talent Sampa the Great. Her music style portrayed in the album has been described as a mix of rock, hip hop, and pop. It was also described as a punk anthem and incorporating the soul genre into the mix.

== Critical reception ==
Professional ratings
Review scores
Source	Rating
DIY Mag	4/5 stars
Hysteria	10/10
NME	4/5 stars
Kill Your Stereo	83/100

The album was well received by critics. On Discogs, which assigns a normalised rating out of 5 to reviews from critics, the album has an average score of 4.67 based on 3 reviews. Thomas Smith of NME praised "Broke Days, Party Nights" for its Beastie Boys-esque sound, and "Price of Living" featuring Dennis Lyxzén and Jason Butler for how the rapper addresses and critiques the current political system. "Future Heroine" and "Closing Ceremony" were praised for having heavy drums, and chunky riffs respectively. "Your Orbit" was "a softer and more melodic side [being] shown", but was by no means lower in quality. "Bad Habit" and "Cold of the World" were compared to the 1990s style of music and rapper M.I.A.

Jonty Cornford summarised the album as "Synth-laden punk anthems with real edge" and recommended it to fans of DZ Deathrays, Art vs. Science, Waax, and Refused.

== Track listing ==
Track listing adapted from Spotify.

All tracks are written by Ecca Vandal and Kidnot, except where noted.

No.	Title	Writer(s)	Length
1.	"Your Way"		3:28
2.	"Broke Days, Party Nights"		2:47
3.	"Price of Living" (featuring Dennis Lyxzén & Jason Aalon Butler)		2:33
4.	"Future Heroine"	Vandal; Mike Elizondo; Danielle Plows	3:59
5.	"Closing Ceremony"		2:31
6.	"Cassettes, Lies, and Videotapes"		4:35
7.	"Your Orbit" (featuring Sampa the Great)	Vandal; Darwin Smith; Sampa Tembo; Richard "Kidnot" Buxton	4:35
8.	"End of Time"		4:05
9.	"Dead Wait"	Vandal; Buxton; Nick Luke	4:08
10.	"Cold of the World"		4:01
11.	"Out on the Inside"		4:32
12.	"Bad Habit"		3:56
Total length:			44:56

== Personnel ==
=== Ecca Vandal ===
- Ecca Vandal – lead vocals
- Unknown – drums
- Unknown – guitar

=== Additional musicians ===
- Dennis Lyxzén – guest vocals on track 3
- Jason Aalon Butler – guest vocals on track 3
- Sampa the Great – guest vocals on track 7

=== Production ===
- Ecca Vandal – producer
- Kidnot – co-producer, engineer
- Hadyn Buxton – mixer
- Ryan Smith – mastering engineer
