= Laura Jean (album) =

Studio album by Laura Jean
- Released: 2014
- Recorded: Toybox Studios, Bristol, England
- Genre: Folk
- Length: 38:17
- Label: Chapter Music
- Producer: John Parish

Laura Jean chronology
A Fool Who'll (2011)	Laura Jean (2014)

Professional ratings
Review scores
Source	Rating
Herald Sun	3.5/5 stars
The Age	4/5 stars

Laura Jean is the fourth album by Melbourne folk singer-songwriter Laura Jean. The album, produced by PJ Harvey collaborator John Parish, was released in August 2014.

The album was included in the Sydney Morning Herald's list of the top 20 albums of the year.

== Track listing ==
(All songs by Laura Jean)

1. "June" – 3:05
2. "How Will I Know When I'm Home?" – 3:57
3. "First Love Song" – 4:54
4. "Sister, All I Have Are My Arms" – 3:33
5. "Here Comes the Miner" – 4:04
6. "When I First Brought Him Home" – 6:28
7. "Kelpie Blues" – 1:12
8. "Don't Marry the One You Love" – 2:56
9. "A Mirror on the Earth" – 5:51
10. "Prince of Kites" – 2:16

== Personnel ==
- Laura Jean Englert — vocals, guitars, synth, piano, percussion, autoharp, bass
- John Parish — drums, banjo, trombone, bass, pedal steel, organ, piano accordion, cymbal, backing vocals
- Ali Chant — engineering, mixing, drum machine
- Jenny Hval — backing vocals
