= Laura Jean =

Australian musician

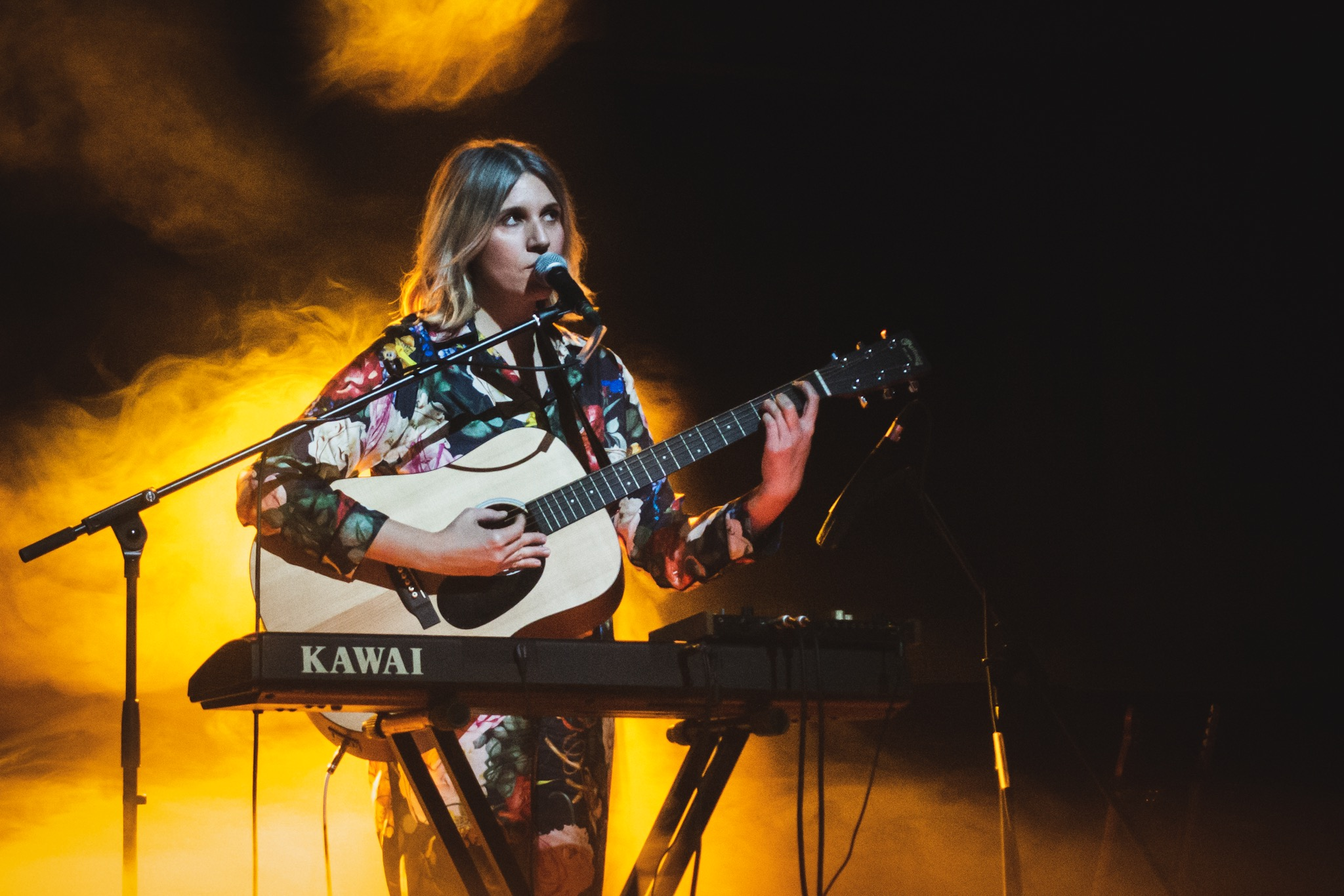
- Laura Jean in 2019

Background information
- Born: Laura Jean Englert; Sydney
- Origin: Melbourne, Victoria, Australia
- Genres: Folk; Classical
- Instruments: Vocals, guitar
- Years active: 2003–present
- Labels: Unstable Ape/Stomp (2003–2007); Scotland Yard/Shock/Y2 (2007–2010); Chapter (2011–present)

Laura Jean Englert is an Australian musician from Melbourne, Victoria who performs as Laura Jean. She is known for her classically inspired folk songs, often using a range of orchestral instruments. She garnered much critical acclaim for her debut album, Our Swan Song, receiving high rotational support from community and alternative radio stations such as Triple J. She received high exposure when Snow Patrol, who are big fans of her, asked her to sing Martha Wainwright's part in the song Set the Fire to the Third Bar during their two Australian tours in 2007. Her second album, Eden Land, was released on 1 March 2008 in Australia. In August 2008, Laura Jean was invited by Deborah Conway to take part in the Broad Festival project, which toured major Australian cities including performing at the Sydney Opera House. With Laura Jean and Conway were Elana Stone, Liz Stringer and Dianna Corcoran – they performed their own and each other's songs.

Laura Jean's third album, A Fool Who'll, was selected as album of the week by Melbourne radio station 3RRR for the week of 29 August 2011.

== Discography ==
=== Albums ===
Title	Details
Our Swan Song	Released: May 2006; Label: Unstable Ape Records (UAR046); Format: CD, digital download
Laura Jean's Eden Land	Released: March 2008; Label: Scotland Yard (SY004); Format: CD, digital download
A Fool Who'll	Released: September 2011; Label: Chapter Records (CH78); Format: CD, digital download
Laura Jean	Released: 22 August 2014; Label: Chapter Records (CH118CD/CH118LP); Format: CD, digital download, LP
Devotion	Released: 8 June 2018; Label: Chapter (CH152CD/CH152LP); Format: CD, digital download, LP, streaming
Amateurs	Scheduled: 4 November 2022; Label: Chapter (CH179CD/CH179LP); Format: CD, digital download, LP, streaming

=== Extended plays ===
Title	Details
The Hunter's Ode	Released: November 2003; Label: Laura Jean / Unstable Ape Records (LJ001); Format: CD
I'm a Rabbit, I'm a Fox	Released: 7 November 2005; Label: Unstable Ape Records (UAR045); Format: CD

== Awards and nominations ==
=== AIR Awards ===
The Australian Independent Record Awards (commonly known informally as AIR Awards) is an annual awards night to recognise, promote and celebrate the success of Australia's Independent Music sector.

Year	Nominee / work	Award	Result	Ref.
2019	herself	Best Independent Artist	Nominated	
2019	Devotion	Best Independent Album	Nominated	
2019	"Girls on the TV"	Best Independent Single/EP	Nominated	
2023	Amateurs	Best Independent Album	Nominated	

=== Australian Music Prize ===
The Australian Music Prize (the AMP) is an annual award of $30,000 given to an Australian band or solo artist in recognition of the merit of an album released during the year of award. It exists to discover, reward and promote new Australian music of excellence.

Year	Nominee / work	Award	Result	Ref.
2014	Laura Jean	Australian Music Prize	Nominated	
2018	Devotion	Australian Music Prize	Nominated	
2022	Amateurs	Australian Music Prize	Nominated	

=== Music Victoria Awards ===
The Music Victoria Awards are an annual awards night celebrating Victorian music. They commenced in 2006.

Year	Nominee / work	Award	Result	Ref.
2014	Laura Jean	Best Female	Nominated	
2014	Laura Jean	Best Folk Roots Album	Nominated	
2014	"My First Love Song"	Best Song	Nominated	
2018	Devotion	Best Album	Nominated	
2018	"Girls on the TV"	Best Song	Nominated	
2018	Laura Jean	Best Solo Artist	Nominated	

=== National Live Music Awards ===
The National Live Music Awards (NLMAs) commenced in 2016 to recognize contributions to the live music industry in Australia.

Year	Nominee / work	Award	Result	Ref.
2023	Laura Jean	Best Live Instrumentalist	Nominated	
