= Ecca Vandal =

Australian singer

- Born: Louis Trichardt, South Africa
- Origin: Melbourne, Victoria, Australia
- Genres: Hip hop; electronic; punk rock; alternative rock; easycore
- Occupations: Singer; songwriter; rapper
- Years active: 2013–present
- Labels: Poison City; Dew Process; Island; Loma Vista
- Website: www.eccavandal.com

Ecca Vandal is a South African-born alternative rock singer, songwriter and rapper based in Melbourne, Australia. Vandal's first album, Ecca Vandal, was released in 2017. Her second, Looking for People to Unfollow was released on 22 May 2026 and won the 2026 Australian Music Prize.

== Early life and education ==
Ecca Vandal was born in Louis Trichardt, South Africa, to Sri Lankan Tamil refugee parents. When she was a child, her parents left South Africa with Ecca and her older sisters, and moved to Australia, settling in Melbourne. Vandal grew up listening to gospel music, before discovering soul, hip hop, and '90s R&B in her sister's record collection. After this, she "became obsessed with jazz music".

Vandal attended the Victorian College of the Arts, studying jazz as part of a Bachelor of Creative Arts.

== Music career ==
=== 2013–2016: Early years ===
In 2014, Vandal released her debut single “White Flag”, co-produced with Kidnot and Hadyn Buxton. The track later appeared on a double A-side 7-inch single, “Battle Royal” / “White Flag”, released in 2015.

In July 2015, she played at Splendour in the Grass.

On 29 January 2016, Vandal's debut EP, End of Time was released, with her performing a promotional national tour throughout February.

=== 2017–2021: Self-titled debut album ===
On 28 July 2017, Vandal released her first single, "Broke Days, Party Nights", from her then-upcoming debut album, with an accompanying music video. On 22 September, the single "Future Heroine" was released, along with its music video. On 12 October, Vandal released the third single, "Price of Living", featuring Dennis Lyxzén of Refused, and Jason Aalon Butler of Letlive. On 20 October, Vandal released her debut self-titled album. Thomas Smith, of NME, gave the album a rating of 4-out-of-5 stars. In November 2017, she performed a national tour for the album. In December, she made her UK tour debut, supporting Frank Carter & The Rattlesnakes. She then returned home to perform at the 2017 Falls Festival.

In March 2018, Vandal supported Incubus on their Australian East Coast tour. In April, she released a music video for her track "Your Orbit", featuring Sampa the Great. June saw Vandal perform at Download Festival on the Avalanche Stage. In July, she performed at Afropunk Paris 2018, held at the Grande Halle de la Villette in Paris, France. On 24–26 August 2018 Vandal performed at the Reading and Leeds Festivals back in the UK, and in September performed at Reeperbahn 2018. In November, she collaborated with Birdz on his track "Place of Dreams". In December, Vandal joined the lineup for the inaugural Good Things Festival.

Vandal appeared on Hilltop Hoods' album The Great Expanse as a featured artist, which was released in February 2019. She appears on the tracks "Be Yourself" alongside feature artist Nyassa, and "Exit Sign" alongside feature artist Illy. "Exit Sign" debuted at #44 on the ARIA Singles Charts. Vandal appeared at the 2019 Dark Mofo festival in Hobart, Tasmania, performing with Two People and Slag Queens. She was featured on the single "In My Mind" by Alice Ivy, released on 10 July 2019. On 10 December, Vandal co-wrote and performed the vocals for League of Legends' new champion Rell's theme song.

On 21 February 2021, Vandal was featured on Void of Vision's re-imagined version of their single "Decay" from their 2019 album Hyperdaze.

=== 2024–present: Looking for People to Unfollow ===
On 7 August 2024, Vandal released the single "Bleed But Never Die", followed later in the year by the more trip-hop-styled single "Then There's One".

On 27 February 2025, she released the single "Cruising To Self Soothe". Through March and April she supported Limp Bizkit on the European leg of their 2025 Loserville tour. On 13 November 2025, Vandal released the single "Molly" along with accompanying music video.

On 4 February 2026, Vandal released the single "Bleach", along with its accompanying music video directed by Vandal and Richie 'kidnot' Buxton. Alfie Sansom from Argus Far called the song "a spiky, screaming self-reflection with a sharp edge [...] as though Trench took an acid plunge".

On 1 April 2026, she released the single "Sorry! Crash!" on streaming platforms ahead of the release of their second album. Alessandra Rincon from Ones to Watchs said, "At its core, “SORRY! CRASH!” lives in that disorienting space between losing control and letting go of the need to hold it together."

In April 2026 Vandal performed at Coachella in California, and in early May she performed in Newtown, Sydney, accompanied by bassist Richie Buxton and drummer Dan Maio. Her second album, Looking for People to Unfollow, released on 22 May 2026.

== Personal life ==
Vandal's partner in music and life is Richie Buxton.

== Discography ==
=== Studio albums ===
List of studio albums
Title	Album details	Peak chart positions				
Title	Album details	AUS	FRA physical	SCO	UK Sales	US Sales
Ecca Vandal	Released: 20 October 2017; Label: Dew Process, Island (UK); Formats: CD, LP, digital download	—	—	—	—	—
Looking for People to Unfollow	Released: 22 May 2026; Label: Loma Vista; Formats: CD, LP vinyl, digital download	12	118	68	67	48

=== Extended plays ===
List of extended plays
Title	EP details
End of Time	Released: 29 January 2016; Label: Dew Process; Format: CD, EP vinyl, digital download

=== Singles ===
==== As lead artist ====
Title	Year	Album
"White Flag"	2014	non-album singles
"Father Hu$$la"	2015	non-album singles
"Battle Royal"	2015	End of Time
"End of Time"	2015	End of Time
"Broke Days, Party Nights"	2017	Ecca Vandal
"Future Heroine"	2017	Ecca Vandal
"Price of Living"	2017	Ecca Vandal
"Bleed But Never Die"	2024	Looking for People to Unfollow
"Then There's One"	2024	Looking for People to Unfollow
"Cruising to Self Soothe"	2025	Looking for People to Unfollow
"Molly"	2025	Looking for People to Unfollow
"Bleach"	2026	Looking for People to Unfollow
"Sorry! Crash!"	2026	Looking for People to Unfollow
"Vertical Worlds"	2026	Looking for People to Unfollow

==== As featured artist ====
Title	Year	Peak chart positions	Certifications	Album
Title	Year	AUS	Certifications	Album
"Oblivion" (Moonbase Commander featuring Ecca Vandal)	2016	–		Orthodox
"Happy Birthday, Lisa" (Dan Cribb featuring Ecca Vandal)	2017	–		Worst Tribute Ever
"I Know How It Goes" (Nina Las Vegas featuring Vera Blue & Ecca Vandal)	2018	–		Lucky Girl
"Place of Dreams" (Birdz featuring Ecca Vandal)	2018	–		Place of Dreams
"Exit Sign" (Hilltop Hoods featuring Illy & Ecca Vandal)	2019	16	ARIA: 6× Platinum	The Great Expanse
"Dare To Fly" (Sampa The Great featuring Ecca Vandal)	2019	–		The Return
"In My Mind" (Alice Ivy featuring Ecca Vandal)	2019	–	ARIA: Gold	Don't Sleep
"Rell, the Iron Maiden" (Riot Games, featuring Ecca Vandal)	2020	_		Non-album singles
"Decay" (Void of Vision, featuring Ecca Vandal)	2021	_		Hyperdaze (Redux)
"—" denotes a recording that did not chart or was not released in that territory.

==== Other appearances ====
List of non-single appearances
Title	Year	Artist(s)	Album
"Be Yourself"	2019	Hilltop Hoods featuring Ecca Vandal & Nyassa	The Great Expanse

=== Music videos ===
Title	Year	Director(s)
"White Flag"	2014	Andrew Stalph; Richard Buxton
"Battle Royal"	2015	Andrew Stalph; Richard Buxton
"Father Hu$$la"	2015	Andrew Stalph; Richard Buxton
"End of Time"	2015	Matthew Chuang
"Truth to Trade"	2016	Richard Buxton
"Broke Days, Party Nights"	2017	Richard Buxton; Sean McDonald
"Future Heroine"	2017	Ecca Vandal; Indoor Fountains
"Your Orbit" (featuring Sampa the Great)	2018	Gabriel Gasparinatos
"Bleed But Never Die"	2024	Ecca Vandal; Richard Buxton
"Then There's One"	2024	Ecca Vandal; Richard Buxton
"Cruising To Self Soothe"	2025	Ecca Vandal; Richard Buxton
"Molly"	2025	Ecca Vandal; Richard Buxton
"Bleach"	2026	Ecca Vandal; Richard Buxton
"Vertical Worlds"	2026	Ecca Vandal; Richard Buxton

== Awards and nominations ==
=== APRA Music Awards ===
The APRA Music Awards were established by Australasian Performing Right Association (APRA) in 1982 to honour the achievements of songwriters and music composers, and to recognise their song writing skills, sales and airplay performance, by its members annually.

Year	Nominee / work	Award	Result	Ref.
2026	"Cruising to Self Soothe" (Ecca Vandal and Richard Buxton)	Song of the Year	Shortlisted	

=== ARIA Music Awards ===
The ARIA Music Awards is an annual awards ceremony that recognises excellence, innovation, and achievement across all genres of Australian music.

Year	Nominee / work	Award	Result	Ref.
2026	Looking for People to Unfollow	Album of the Year	Nominated	
2026	Looking for People to Unfollow	Best Solo Artist	Nominated	
2026	Looking for People to Unfollow	Best Alternative Release	Won	
2026	Looking for People to Unfollow	Michael Gudinski Breakthrough Artist	Won	
2026	Looking for People to Unfollow	Best Cover Art	Won	
2026	Richie Buxton for Ecca Vandal – "Cruising to Self Soothe"	Best Video	Nominated	

=== Australian Music Prize ===
The Australian Music Prize (the AMP) is an annual award of $50,000 given to an Australian band or solo artist in recognition of the merit of an album released during the year of award. It commenced in 2005.

Year	Nominee / work	Award	Result	Ref.
2026	Looking for People to Unfollow	Australian Music Prize	Won	

=== J Awards ===
The J Awards are an annual series of Australian music awards that were established by the Australian Broadcasting Corporation's youth-focused radio station Triple J. They commenced in 2005.

Year	Nominee / work	Award	Result	Ref.
2025	"Cruising to Self Soothe" (directed by Ecca Vandal and Richie Buxton)	Australian Video of the Year	Nominated	
2026	Looking for People to Unfollow	Australian Album of the Year	Nominated	
2026	Ecca Vandal	Australian Live Act of the Year	Nominated	

=== National Live Music Awards ===
The National Live Music Awards (NLMAs) are a broad recognition of Australia's diverse live industry, celebrating the success of the Australian live scene. The awards commenced in 2016.

Year	Nominee / work	Award	Result
2018	Ecca Vandal	Best Live Act of the Year - People's Choice	Nominated
