= The Return (Sampa the Great album) =

Studio album by Sampa the Great
- Released: 13 September 2019
- Studios: Carl's Place, Love Electric Studios, Maltbam, Map King Cave, Park Orchard Sound Recordings, Soup Studios, The Grove
- Genres: Hip-hop; R&B; jazz rap
- Length: 77:50
- Label: Ninja Tune

Sampa the Great chronology
Birds and the BEE9 (2017)	The Return (2019)	As Above, So Below (2022)

Singles from The Return
- 1. "Final Form" Released: 5 June 2019; 2. "OMG" Released: 11 July 2019; 3. "Freedom" Released: 21 August 2019; 4. "Time's Up" Released: July 2020

The Return is the debut studio album by Zambian singer-songwriter and rapper Sampa the Great. It was released in September 2019 and peaked at number 12 on the ARIA Charts.

At the J Awards of 2019, the album was nominated for Australian Album of the Year.

In February 2020, the album won the Australian Music Prize 2019 and in doing so, Sampa the Great became the first musician to win the award twice.

At the AIR Awards of 2020, the album won Best Independent Hip Hop Album or EP. At the ARIA Music Awards of 2020, the album received four nominations, including Album of the Year. Sampa the Great won Best Female Artist, Best Independent Release and Best Hip Hop Release for The Return. At the Music Victoria Awards of 2020, the album won Best Soul, Funk, R'n'B and Gospel Album and Best Album.

== Reception ==
Professional ratings
Aggregate scores
Source	Rating
Metacritic	83/100
Review scores
Source	Rating
AllMusic	4/5 stars
Beat Magazine	8.5/10
Clash	8/10
The Guardian	3/5 stars
Mojo	4/5 stars
The Music	4.5/5 stars

Paul Simpson from AllMusic said "The Return is the long-awaited debut album by rapper, songwriter, and poet Sampa the Great. The vast, ambitious full-length reflects several years of constant, intense soul-searching, and its songs and interludes revolve around themes of identity, homecoming, and self-empowerment." Simpson added "Though her music incorporates a wide variety of jazz, soul, and African influences, her dedication to hip-hop is never more apparent than on the victorious 'Final Form', a black power anthem with a strong, '9th Wonder'-inspired beat" calling the album "an impressive, powerful work."

Rachel Aroesti from The Guardian said "despite weaving southern African influences into the drumming and multilingual lyrics, Tembo's keen intellect and strong personality isn't always accompanied by the most distinctive sound. Highlight 'Final Form' channels Kanye West's brash take on classic soul and there is much busy but generic R&B on the bloated tracklist. Her vocal, meanwhile, can be offputtingly affected, resembling a parody of Kendrick Lamar's reedy, staccato flow. That said, Tembo is undoubtedly an intriguing addition to rap's increasingly rich tapestry – albeit one yet to land on a sonic palette as fresh and compelling as her perspective."

Madelyn Tait from The Music said "Drawing influence from hip hop, jazz, soul, R&B and southern African sounds, Sampa The Great has created something original, somewhat spiritual, and entirely authentic. She has remained at the forefront of the Australian hip hop scene for numerous years now, but with The Return, is destined for global acclaim."

Jack Doherty from Clash call the album "A bold post-genre record packed with inspired moments" adding "While there are times Sampa The Great leans hard into hip-hop's history – 'Time's Up' and Heaven' in particular, have a real 90s skate shop vibe about them – on the whole this record is overwhelming about [sic] the future, not the past. The beats often break away from standard rap shtick, taking the listener beyond genre and into the unknown."

Scott Hudson from Beat Magazine said "Sampa Tembo is a master of her craft but almost as importantly, she understands the value of collaboration. The Return is stacked with features from artists of African descent, Australian and abroad. Nineteen tracks is a lot to ask of any listener but Sampa's control of cadence paired with well-produced, well-performed instrumentals and choir sections, is enough for you to chronically listen to 'just one more'." Stevie Chick of Mojo wrote "The Return could do with editing, as its unweidly 78 minutes risk losing the audience before its finest songs...but too much of a good thing is nothing to hold a grudge over."

== Track listing ==
1. "Mwana" (featuring Mwanje Tembo, Theresa Mutale Tembo & Sunburnt Soul Choir) – 4:27
2. "Freedom" – 4:06
3. "Wake Up" (Interlude) – 0:54
4. "Time's Up" (featuring Krown) – 2:33
5. "Grass Is Greener" – 3:32
6. "Dare to Fly" (featuring Ecca Vandal) – 4:23
7. "Any Day" (featuring Whosane) – 4:17
8. "OMG" – 2:34
9. "Light It Up" (Interlude) – 2:15
10. "Final Form" – 3:36
11. "Heaven" (featuring Whosane) – 2:55
12. "Diamond in the Ruff" (featuring Thando & Krown) – 4:54
13. "Leading Us Home" – 4:05
14. "Summer" (featuring Steam Down) – 4:24
15. "Brand New (featuring SILENTJAY) – 3:48
16. "Give Love" (Interlude) – 2:21
17. "The Return" (featuring Thando, Jace XL, Alien & Whosane) – 9:17
18. "Don't Give Up" (featuring Mandarin Dreams) – 7:04
19. "Made Us Better" (featuring Blue Lab Beats, Boadi & Lori) – 6:20

Sample credits

- "Final Form" contains a sample of "Stay Away From Me" performed by the Sylvers and written by Leon Sylvers III.
- "Freedom" contains a sample of "Visions" performed by The Brief Encounter and written by Gary Bailey.
- "Diamonds In The Ruff" contains an interpolation "Son Of Pin Head" written by Katsunori Ishida
- "Heaven" contains a sample of "I'm So Happy" performed by Light of the World and written by Peter Hinds, Ganiyu Bello, Everton McCalla, David John-Baptiste, Neville McKrieth, Canute Wellington, Nathaniel Augustin and Paul Williams.
- "Brand New" contains a sample of "You Make Me Feel Brand New" performed by Ron English and written by Thom Bell and Linda Epstein.

== Personnel ==
Adapted from the liner notes.

- Sampa the Great – vocals
- Mwanje Tembo – vocals (tracks 1, 16), additional vocals (tracks 11–13, 17)
- Theresa Tembo – sampled voice (track 1)
- Perrin Moss – production (track 1), drums (tracks 1, 6, 18), bass (tracks 1, 6), synthesizer (track 1), guitar (tracks 1, 6), piano (track 18)
- Silentjay – production (tracks 2, 4–7, 9–15, 17–19), co-production (track 8), keyboards (tracks 4, 12), drum programming (tracks 4, 5, 9, 12, 13, 17), additional vocals (tracks 5, 17, 19), wurlitzer (track 5), organ (tracks 6, 12, 17), synth bass (track 6), rhodes (tracks 9, 13), clavinet (tracks 13, 17), roland juno (track 13), beatboxing (track 13), soprano saxophone (tracks 14, 18), string arrangements (track 17), bass (track 18), piano (track 19)
- Thando – additional vocals (track 2), vocals (tracks 12, 17)
- Syreneiscreamy – additional vocals (tracks 2, 17), production (track 16)
- Ecca Vandal – additional vocals (tracks 2, 17), vocals (track 6)
- Whosane – additional vocals (track 2), vocals (tracks 7, 11, 16, 17)
- Alejandro Abapo – additional vocals (track 2)
- Tebir – additional vocals (track 2)
- Jace XL – additional vocals (track 2), vocals (track 17)
- Sunburnt Soul Choir – additional vocals (track 2)
- Kumar Shome – guitar (tracks 4, 5, 12, 14, 16, 17), additional guitar (track 13)
- Alfrd – additional keyboards (track 4)
- Krown – vocals (tracks 4, 12)
- Kwes Darko – production (track 8)
- Alien – additional vocals (tracks 13, 17)
- Steam Down – guest band (track 14)
- Wayne Francis – horn arrangements (track 14), tenor saxophone (track 14)
- Charlotta Naima Adams – vocals (track 14)
- Dwayne Frederick Kilvington – bass (track 14)
- Ayo Salawu – drums (track 14)
- Lorenz Okello-Osengor – keyboards (track 14)
- Ike Ruckman – guitar (tracks 17, 18)
- Jimmy Bowman – wurlitzer (track 17), electric piano (track 18), trumpet (track 18), trombone (track 18)
- Simon Mavin – organ (track 17), rhodes (track 17), additional synthesizers (track 17), co-production (track 17)
- Kuzich – percussion (tracks 17, 18)
- Paul Bender – strings (track 17), string arrangements (track 17), co-production (track 17)
- Mandarin Dreams – guest band (track 18)
- Boadi – vocals (track 19)
- Lori – vocals (track 19)
- Mr. DM – bass (track 19), guitar (track 19), additional keyboards (track 19), production (track 19)
- NK OK – drum programming (track 19), production (track 19)

== Charts ==
Chart (2019)	Peak position
Australian Albums (ARIA)	12
UK Album Downloads (Official Charts)	64

== Release history ==
Region	Date	Format	Label	Catalogue
Various	13 September 2019	CD, digital download, 2x LP, streaming	Ninja Tune	ZEN258
