= Floodlights (band) =

Australian band

- Origin: Melbourne, Australia
- Genres: Rock; alternative; art rock
- Years active: 2018–present
- Labels: Spunk Records; PIAS
- Members: Louis Parsons; Ashlee Kehoe; Archie Shannon; Joe Draffen; Sarah Hellyer
- Website: floodlightsband.com

Floodlights are an Australian rock band from Melbourne, Victoria, formed in 2018. The group are composed of Louis Parsons, Ashlee Kehoe, Joe Draffen, Archie Shannon and Sarah Hellyer.

The idea of Floodlights was conceived during a conversation at the iconic Melbourne pub The Tote Hotel. Their debut EP Backyard was self-released in May 2019, later being picked up by Spunk Records, who re-released the EP that year, and signed the band on for their debut album From a View, which surfaced in July 2020.

In June 2021, Floodlights released a two-song 7" on local Melbourne label Tiny Town. In early April 2023, the band released their second album Painting of My Time, supported by European and Australian tour dates across the year. This included a home-state performance at Meredith Music Festival, with The Age reporting them as one of the event's outstanding acts.

Floodlights' third album, Underneath, was released in March 2025 through PIAS. It is the first to feature trumpeter Sarah Hellyer as a permanent member of the band.

== Discography ==
=== Studio albums ===
List of albums, with selected details
Title	Album details	Peak chart positions
Title	Album details	AUS
From a View	Released: 17 July 2020; Label: Spunk; Formats: LP, CD, digital download, streaming	—
Painting of My Time	Released: 21 April 2023; Label: Self-released; Formats: LP, digital download, streaming	—
Underneath	Released: 21 March 2025; Label: PIAS (PIASAU024LP); Formats: LP, CD, digital download, streaming	66

=== EPs ===
List of EPs, with selected details
Title	Details
Backyard	Released: 24 May 2019; Label: Spunk; Formats: 10", digital download, streaming

== Awards and nominations ==
=== Australian Music Prize ===
The Australian Music Prize (the AMP) is an annual award of $50,000 given to an Australian band or solo artist in recognition of the merit of an album released during the year of award. It commenced in 2005.

Year	Nominee / work	Award	Result	Ref.
2023	Painting My Time	Australian Music Prize	Nominated	
2025	Underneath	Australian Music Prize	Nominated	
