= Final Form (song) =

2019 single by Sampa the Great

Single by Sampa the Great

from the album The Return
- Released: 5 June 2019
- Length: 3:36
- Label: Ninja Tune
- Songwriters: Sampa Tembo; Alejandro John Abapo; Leon Sylvers III
- Producer: Silentjay

Sampa the Great singles chronology
"Energy" (2018)	"Final Form" (2019)	"OMG" (2019)

Music video
- "Final Form" on YouTube

"Final Form" is a song by Zambian rapper and singer Sampa the Great. The song was released on 5 June 2019 as the second single from Sampa the Great's debut studio album, The Return. The song samples The Sylvers' 1973 funk track "Stay Away from Me" and Blood, Sweat & Tears’ “Spinning Wheel”.

Sampa described the song as being about "expanding yourself and calling out any negativity towards that growth process".

At the ARIA Music Awards of 2019, the song won the ARIA award for Best Hip Hop Release. At the APRA Music Awards of 2020, the song was shortlisted for Song of the Year.

== Critical reception ==
Al Newstead of Triple J described the single as "breathtaking", saying "like her best tracks, 'Final Form' has an empowering effect that makes you feel ferocious, insurmountable; like you could take on the world and win without breaking a sweat."

In a review of the parent album, The Music's Madelyn Tait said the song was "confident, empowering and intrinsically connected to Tembo's heritage."

Rachel Aroesti of The Guardian referred to the track as an album highlight in an album review.

== In other media ==
The song was featured in an advertisement for IKEA as well as the trailer for Play Dirty (2025).

== Track listing ==
Digital single
No.	Title	Length
1.	"Final Form"	3:36
