= Sampa the Great =

Zambian rapper and musician

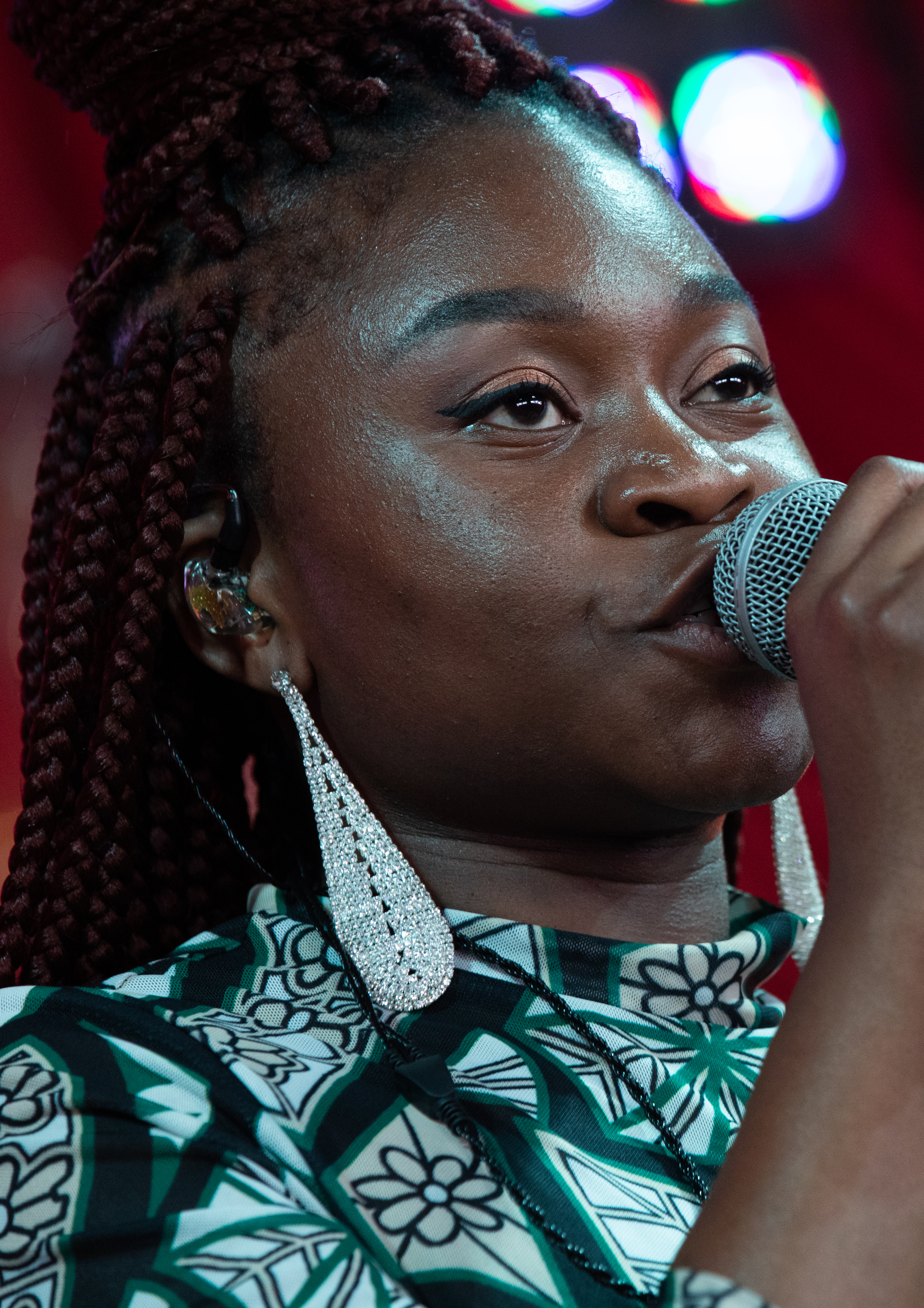
- Sampa the Great at Glastonbury Festival 2019

Background information
- Born: Sampa Tembo; 9 August 1993 (age 33); Luanshya, Zambia
- Genre: Hip-hop
- Occupations: Singer; songwriter; rapper; poet
- Years active: 2014–present
- Labels: Wondercore Island; Big Dada; Ninja Tune; Loma Vista Recordings
- Website: sampathegreat.com

Sampa Tembo (born August 9, 1993), known professionally as Sampa the Great, is a Zambian singer, rapper, and songwriter. Between 2014 and 2020, she was based in Australia. Her debut solo album, The Return (September 2019), peaked at No. 12 on the ARIA Albums Chart. At the 2019 ARIA Music Awards she won Best Hip Hop Release for her second single, "Final Form". In the following year she won the same category for The Return, as well as Best Female Artist and Best Independent Release. In March 2020 Sampa became the first artist to win the Australian Music Prize twice: for Birds and the Bee9 (November 2017) and The Return. The artist was based back in Zambia from late 2020, where she issued her second studio album, As Above, So Below (September 2022).

== Early life ==
Sampa Tembo was born in 1993 in Luanshya, Zambia as the third of five children. Her family moved to Gaborone, Botswana when she was one year old, due to unrest related to economic reforms and the transition to multi-party democracy, but visited relatives in Zambia often during the holidays during her childhood. Her mother Theresa, a dancer, is from the Bemba people while her father Alfred, an insurance broker and some-time DJ, is from the Tumbuka. Her sister, Mwanje Tembo, is a singer. Her uncle, George Kunda, was a founding member of Witch. She received both piano and singing lessons and started writing poems/lyrics from the age of nine. In the early 2010s she studied music for visual media at the Academy of Art University, San Francisco, for two years and Los Angeles for a year. While in San Francisco, she recorded two tracks.

Tembo moved to Sydney in 2013 and was based there until 2018, she completed a bachelor's degree in audio engineering at SAE Institute in 2015. From 2018 to 2020, she was based in Melbourne. The artist acknowledges her family and communities in both Botswana and Zambia as the foundation of her success.

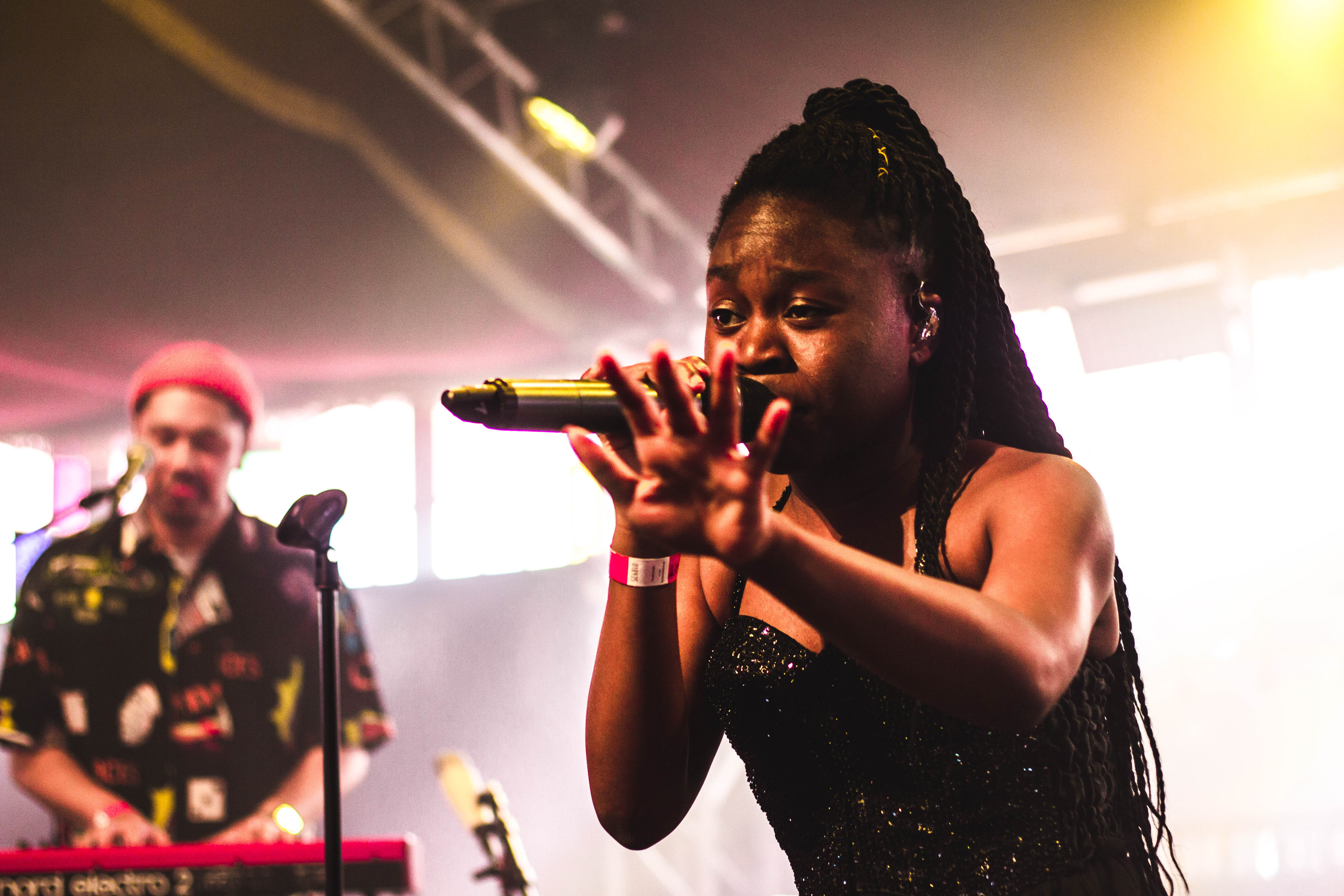
Sampa the Great (right) performing at Haldern Pop, Germany in August 2018.

== Music career ==
=== 2015–2016: Early years ===
Tembo was featured on the second single, "Beauty" (September 2015), by future soul singer-songwriter Wallace (a.k.a. Wallace Gollan). The rapper's debut mixtape, The Great Mixtape, was released as a free download on 16 October 2015, and later on CD and vinyl by Melbourne label Wondercore Island. The artist described it as "a search for creativity, laughter, purpose and rhythms", and credits her African youth for inspiring the "political consciousness" on the record. It was produced by Sydney-based Dave Rodriguez (p.k.a. Godriguez). They had met at a jazz and hip-hop freestyle at a club, Foundry, in Sydney. Tembo's vocals were recorded in two takes. On 18 December a mixtape track, "F E M A L E", was released as a single. The track was co-written by Tembo with D Rodrguez-Lovibond.

On 19 January 2016 Tembo released a standalone single, "Black Dignity". Two days later another standalone single, "Blue Boss", was issued. The rapper featured on the track "Second Heartbeat" alongside Okenyo, for Urthboy's fifth studio album, The Past Beats Inside Me Like a Second Heartbeat (March 2016). Another two standalone singles followed, "24" and "Blessings", released together on 25 May. On 6 October she issued a music video, "HERoes (The Call)". On 27 October a related music video, "HERoes (The Response)", was released.

=== 2017–2018: HERoes Act 2 to Birds and the Bee9 ===
On 28 April 2017 Tembo released a single, "Everybody's Hero" featuring British singer Estelle. Her debut extended play, HERoes Act 2 was the issued on 12 May. In an interview she described it as, "a snapshot of a time of uncertainty and doubt, and the realisation that those aspects are very normal". On the EP the rapper collaborated with producer, Rahki. The second and third singles from the EP, "The Plug" and "Paved with Gold", also featuring Estelle, were released on 11 May.

Tembo issued a second mixtape, Birds and the Bee9 on 10 November 2017, which "crosses hip-hop, soul, jazz, gospel and reggae", via the Big Dada label. It was produced by Sensible J, Silentjay and Kwesi Darko. The track "Casper" contained guest vocals from Syreneyiscreamy, the track "Inner Voice" contained guest vocals from Mwanje Tembo, and the track "Healer" contained guest vocals from Zaachariaha. The mixtape won the Australian Music Prize in March 2018, which includes AUD$30000 from Phonographic Performance Company of Australia (PPCA), with their CEO Dan Rosen hoping it, "will assist in developing [her] career and help take her music to the world." She hoped to use the prizemoney to fund her own home studio.

Birds and the Bee9 received positive reviews. The Guardian's Kitty Empire noticed influences from Lauryn Hill. On 3 October the single, "Rhymes to the East", was released. On 17 October, the single "Bye River" was released. On 20 October, she featured on the track "Your Orbit" by Ecca Vandal, on her eponymous debut album Ecca Vandal. On 5 April 2018 a music video, "Black Girl Magik" featuring Nicole Gumbe, was issued. On 23 April the rapper was featured in the music video, "Your Orbit" by Ecca Vandal.

=== 2018–2020: The Return ===
On 29 November 2018 the artist released her single, "Energy" featuring Nadeem Din-Gabisi along with an accompanying music video. She intended to release her debut studio album later that year: however, it was delayed. On 5 June 2019 another single, "Final Form" appeared with a music video. Her debut album, The Return, was released on 13 September 2019 via Ninja Tune. In October 2019 she was listed at No. 2 on Happy Mag's "The 15 Australian Female Artists Changing the Game Right Now."

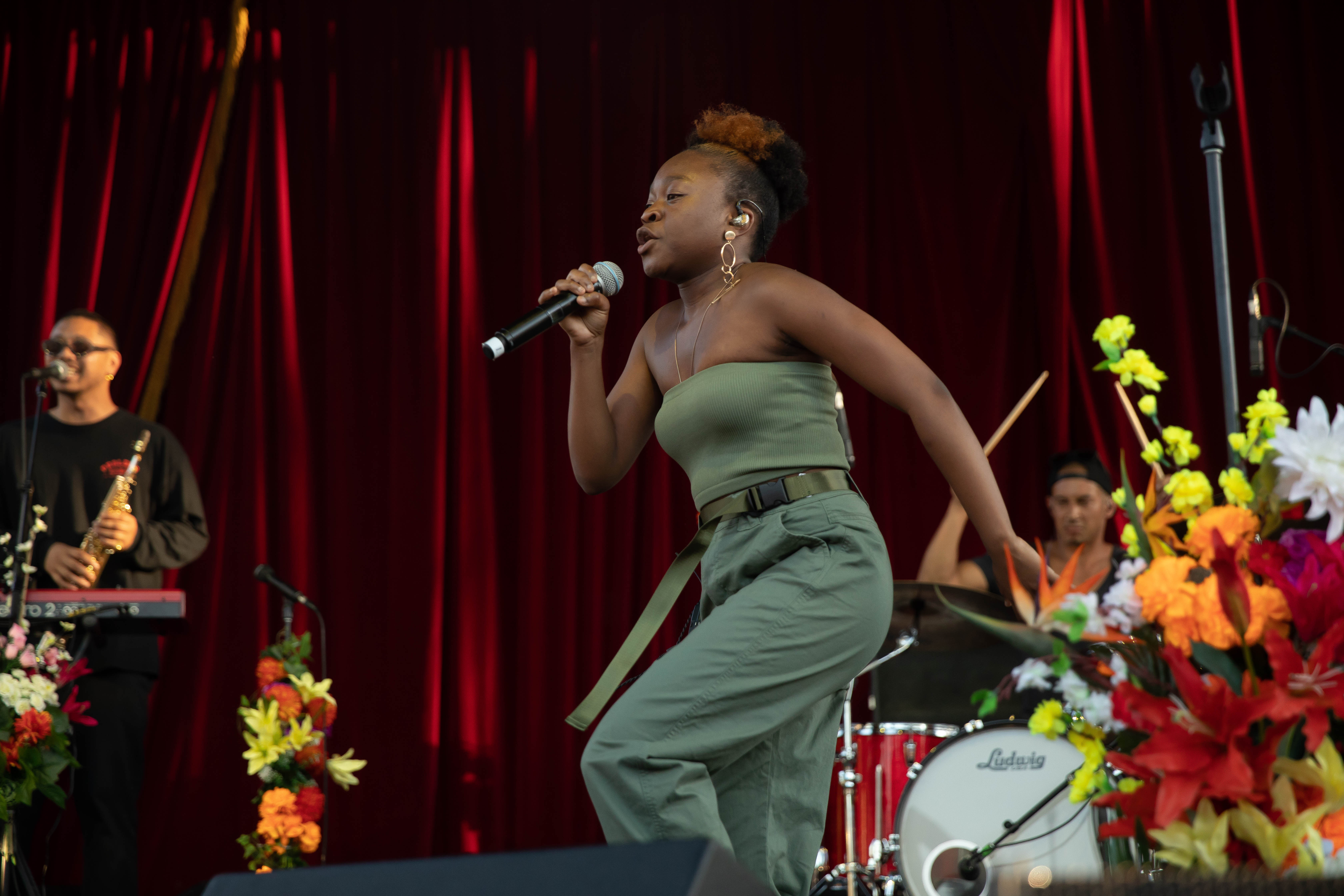
Performing at Fairgrounds Festival, December 2018

At the ARIA Music Awards of 2019 Tembo was nominated in two categories: Best Video (directed by Sanjay De Silva) and Best Hip Hop Release for "Final Form". Upon winning Best Hip Hop Release the artist was "snubbed" by ARIA when the TV broadcast switched to a commercial rather than show her acceptance speech. As the first female person of colour to win a hip-hop category the move exemplified systemic racism in the industry. In March 2020 Tembo won the Australian Music Prize for The Return; becoming the first musician in its 15-year history to win the award twice.

On 23 September 2020 the singer released "Better Days" with Baker Boy and Dallas Woods. The artist was nominated in six categories at the 2020 ARIA Music Awards, held in November, and won three: Best Hip Hop Release, Best Female Artist and Best Independent Release for The Return. She also performed at the 2020 ceremony through a video-link to Botswana and delivered "a strong statement" on "lack of diversity of the Australian music industry" and specifically took aim at the ARIA board for her snubbing in the previous year.

=== 2021–2024: As Above, So Below ===
In November 2021, Tembo confirmed new music would arrive early in the next year. She toured North America in March and April 2022. Her track, "Never Forget", is a tribute to Zamrock; she also worked with Emmanuel Jagari Chanda, lead singer of Witch.

Tembo released her second studio album, As Above, So Below, on 9 September 2022. It was produced by Mag44 and received positive reviews from critics. It peaked at No. 12 on the ARIA albums chart. In September 2022 the singer-rapper supported Billie Eilish's tour of Australia and undertook a European tour in the following two months.

Tembo produced the theme song for the 2023 animated series Supa Team 4. Sampa featured on vocals on the first track "Life Goes On" of the Ezra Collective’s album Where I'm Meant to Be, which won the Mercury Prize in September 2023.

=== 2025–present: Nu Zamrock ===
On 30 October 2026, Tembo released Nu Zamrock. It was preceded by singles "Can't Hold Us" and "Simon Says". The album is influenced by Zamrock.

== Personal life ==
Sampa Tembo's identity as a Zambian-born, Botswana-raised individual is fundamental to her music. However, once her work appeared on radio, media reported on her as "Australia's own" and "Australia's next big thing in hip-hop." She reflected, "For anyone who's of the diverse world, or who has had trouble or has a journey with where they are from, it's important to document your stripes whether small or big, because we're living in a world that makes it harder for you to find those origins, and sometimes often mocks you for finding those origins." Outside of her music career Tembo is interested in sprinting.

== Musical influences ==
Tembo's early work "was inspired by spiritually-minded gospel, with nods to neo-soul and hip-hop intertwined with her no-holds-barred political outlook." She discovered hip-hop as a child, noting listening to 2Pac's "Changes" as a catalyst for her interest in the genre. She has been influenced by Mos Def and Chance the Rapper. She has performed as a supporting act for Joey Bada$$, as well as Kendrick Lamar, Thundercat, and Denzel Curry. Tembo described Joey as a "passionate artist and an amazing performer".

She invokes a variety of influences, including abstract hip-hop beats, African influences, electronica, spiritual neo-soul, and other styles. Her music is described as earthy and eclectic.

== Discography ==
- The Return (2019)
- As Above, So Below (2022)
- Nu Zamrock (2026)

== Awards and nominations ==
=== AIR Awards ===
The Australian Independent Record Awards (commonly known informally as AIR Awards) is an annual awards night to recognise, promote and celebrate the success of Australia's Independent Music sector.

| Year | Nominee / work | Award | Result |
|---|---|---|---|
| 2020 | The Return | Independent Album of the Year | Nominated |
| 2020 | The Return | Best Independent Hip Hop Album or EP | Won |
| 2020 | "Final Form" | Independent Song of the Year | Nominated |

=== APRA Awards ===
The APRA Awards are held in Australia and New Zealand by the Australasian Performing Right Association to recognise songwriting skills, sales and airplay performance by its members annually. Sampa the Great has been nominated for one award.

| Year | Nominee / work | Award | Result | Ref. |
|---|---|---|---|---|
| 2020 | herself | Breakthrough Songwriter of the Year | Nominated | |
| 2020 | "Final Form" (Sampa Tembo, Alejandro Abapo, Leon Sylvers) | Song of the Year | Shortlisted | |
| 2022 | "Ezinna" by B Wise, Sampa The Great & Becca Hatch (Nicholas Martin, Milan Ring, Sampa Tembo, Tung Yeng, James Iheakanwa) | Song of the Year | Shortlisted | |
| 2023 | "Lane" (featuring Denzel Curry) | Song of the Year | Shortlisted | |
| 2023 | herself | Breakthrough Songwriter of the Year | Won | |
| 2024 | "Bona" | Most Performed Hip Hop/Rap Work | Nominated | |

=== ARIA Music Awards ===
The ARIA Music Awards is an annual award ceremony event celebrating the Australian music industry. Sampa the Great won Best Hip Hop Release at the ARIA Music Awards of 2019, from two nominations. She won three categories from six nominations in 2020.

| Year | Nominee / work | Award | Result |
|---|---|---|---|
| 2019 | "Final Form" | Best Hip Hop Release | Won |
| 2019 | Sanjay De Silva for "Final Form" | Best Video | Nominated |
| 2020 | The Return | Album of the Year | Nominated |
| 2020 | The Return | Best Female Artist | Won |
| 2020 | The Return | Best Independent Release | Won |
| 2020 | The Return | Best Hip Hop Release | Won |
| 2020 | "Time's Up" (featuring Krown) | Best Video | Nominated |
| 2020 | The Return Australian Tour 2019 | Best Australian Live Act | Nominated |

=== Australian Music Prize ===
The Australian Music Prize (the AMP) is an annual award of $30,000 given to an Australian band or solo artist in recognition of the merit of an album released during the year of award. It exists to discover, reward and promote new Australian music of excellence.

| Year | Nominee / work | Award | Result | Ref. |
|---|---|---|---|---|
| 2017 | Birds and the Bee9 | Australian Music Prize | Won | |
| 2019 | The Return | Australian Music Prize | Won | |
| 2022 | As Above, So Below | Australian Music Prize | Nominated | |

=== J Awards ===
The J Awards are an annual series of Australian music awards that were established by the Australian Broadcasting Corporation's youth-focused radio station Triple J. They commenced in 2005.

| Year | Nominee / work | Award | Result | Ref. |
|---|---|---|---|---|
| 2018 | "Black Girl Magik" | Australian Video of the Year | Nominated | |
| 2018 | herself | Double J Artist of the Year | Nominated | |
| 2019 | The Return | Australian Album of the Year | Nominated | |
| 2019 | herself | Double J Artist of the Year | Won | |
| 2019 | "Final Form" | Australian Video of the Year | Won | |
| 2020 | Sampa the Great featuring Krown - "Time's Up" | Australian Video of the Year | Nominated | |
| 2022 | As Above, So Below | Australian Album of the Year | Nominated | |
| 2022 | Sampa the Great | Double J Artist of the Year | Nominated | |

=== MTV Europe Music Awards ===
The MTV Europe Music Awards is an award presented by Viacom International Media Networks to honour artists and music in pop culture.

| Year | Nominee / work | Award | Result |
|---|---|---|---|
| 2019 | Herself | Best Australian Act | Nominated |

=== Music Victoria Awards ===
The Music Victoria Awards, are an annual awards night celebrating Victorian music. The commenced in 2005.

| Year | Nominee / work | Award | Result |
|---|---|---|---|
| 2018 | Birds and the Bee9 | Best Album | Nominated |
| 2018 | Birds and the Bee9 | Best Soul, Funk, R&B Album | Won |
| 2018 | herself | Best Solo Artist | Nominated |
| 2018 | herself | Best Female Musician | Nominated |
| 2018 | herself | Best Hip Hop Act | Won |
| 2019 | "Final Form" | Best Song | Nominated |
| 2019 | herself | Best Solo Artist | Nominated |
| 2019 | herself | Best Female Musician | Nominated |
| 2019 | herself | Best Live Act | Nominated |
| 2019 | herself | Best Hip Hop Act | Won |
| 2020 | The Return | Best Album | Won |
| 2020 | The Return | Best Soul, Funk, R'n'B and Gospel Album | Won |
| 2020 | "OMG" | Best Song | Won |
| 2020 | herself | Best Solo Artist | Won |
| 2020 | herself | Best Musician | Nominated |
| 2020 | herself | Best Live Act | Nominated |
| 2020 | herself | Best Hip Hop Act | Nominated |
| 2020 | herself | Best Intercultural Act | Nominated |
| 2021 | herself | Best Solo Artist | Won |

=== National Indigenous Music Awards ===
The National Indigenous Music Awards is an annual awards ceremony that recognises the achievements of Indigenous Australians in music. The award ceremony commenced in 2004.

| Year | Nominee / work | Award | Result | Ref. |
|---|---|---|---|---|
| 2021 | "Better Days (with Baker Boy & Dallas Woods) | Song of the Year | Nominated | |

=== National Live Music Awards ===
The National Live Music Awards (NLMAs) are a broad recognition of Australia's diverse live industry, celebrating the success of the Australian live scene. The awards commenced in 2016.

| Year | Nominee / work | Award | Result |
|---|---|---|---|
| 2016 | herself | The Heatseeker Award (Best New Act) | Nominated |
| 2016 | herself | Live Hip Hop Act of the Year | Nominated |
| 2016 | herself | Live R&B or Soul Act of the Year | Nominated |
| 2017 | herself | Live Hip Hop Act of the Year | Nominated |
| 2017 | herself | People's Choice - Best Live Voice of the Year | Nominated |
| 2018 | herself | Live Hip Hop Act of the Year | Nominated |
| 2018 | herself | People's Choice - Best Live Voice of the Year | Nominated |
| 2019 | herself | Live Hip Hop Act of the Year | Won |
| 2020 | herself | Live Act of the Year | Won |
| 2020 | herself | Live Voice of the Year | Nominated |
| 2020 | herself | Victorian Live Act of the Year | Nominated |
| 2023 | herself | Live Voice in Victoria | Nominated |
