= Adalita (album) =

Studio album by Adalita
- Released: 4 March 2011
- Recorded: 2009 at Head Gap, Melbourne
- Genre: Alternative rock
- Length: 49:44
- Label: Liberation Music
- Producers: Dean Turner, Adalita

Adalita chronology
Adalita (2011)	All Day Venus (2013)

Singles from Adalita
- 1. "Hot Air" Released: November 2010; 2. "The Repairer" Released: March 2011; 3. "Fool Around (Alternate Edit)" Released: September 2011

Adalita is the debut studio album by Australian musician Adalita. It was released by Liberation Music in March 2011. It received the Australian Independent Record (AIR) Award for 'Best Independent Album' in 2011.

== Background and history ==
Adalita announced, via Magic Dirt’s website that she was playing her first solo shows, taking up a month-long residency at The Retreat Hotel in Melbourne, in April 2009. It was also during this time that she revealed, via the band’s forum, that she was planning to record a solo album later in the year. Adalita has later stated that it was Dean Turner, her Magic Dirt bandmate, that encouraged her to pursue a solo venture. She had always written songs that were not always right for Magic Dirt, and Turner suggested she pursue these songs solo. Writing for the solo album began in late 2008. All the songs for the album were, however, written specifically for the album, and were not leftovers from Magic Dirt.

Later, in 2009, she toured solo in Victoria and New South Wales, playing mostly new material with a number of Magic Dirt tracks included in her sets. During this tour, Adalita revealed that she had started recording the album, at Head Gap Studios in Melbourne, with Turner co-producing and J.P. Shilo playing on the recordings. Despite being in the studio when well enough, Turner was largely housebound during the recording, and Adalita would go to his house, near Head Gap, to play him the demos. The track "The Repairer" was written about Turner when he became gravely ill. Adalita has said that she wrote song about her fear of losing Turner when she realised he may die. Recording for the album was completed in July 2009.

Turner died on 21 August 2009 of dermatofibrosarcoma protuberans, a rare form of tissue cancer, and work on the album ceased. Magic Dirt toured in October 2009, and again as part of the Big Day Out tour in January 2010, as a tribute to Turner.

Adalita resumed work on the album when mixing began in March 2010. She then resumed touring solo in July, with a short tour of New South Wales and a show in Melbourne. In November and December 2010, Adalita supported Blondie and The Pretenders nationally, at their A Day On The Green shows and their headlining shows in Sydney and Melbourne. To coincide with the tour, she released the Hot Air EP, the first of the solo material to be released. The EP contained the album's first single, ‘Hot Air’, along with the three additional tracks that would not appear on the album. Adalita had planned on having the album released by the end of 2010, but was delayed by signing to Liberation Music. The album artwork also contributed to delay. Adalita worked on the artwork for the album herself, and has stated that it was long process.

In February 2011, Adalita announced that the album would be released on 4 March 2011, along with a national tour, supporting the album.

During promotional interviews for the album, Adalita often talked about Dean Turner, stating that while most of the songs were written before Turner became chronically ill, “…now that Dean’s gone, it’s definitely taken on a new [light]; it’s got different connotations for me now. There’s a sadness or heartbreak in the record. At the time when I was writing, a lot of the songs were not about Dean or losing Dean. In retrospect, that’s how I look at it now; I filter it through my experiences.”

== Reception ==
Professional ratings
Review scores
Source	Rating
The Age	4.5/5 stars
The AU Review	5/10 stars
Web Cuts	7.5/10 stars
The Advertiser	3.5/5 stars
BMA Magazine	4/5 stars
The Mercury	4/5 stars

=== Critical response ===
Adalita received generally positive reviews from critics upon its release. The album received many comparisons to the work of PJ Harvey, Patti Smith and Cat Power. The Age gave the album 4.5 out of 5 stars, calling it “uncompromising, but vitally accessible” and “a landmark Australian release”. In his review for Faster Louder, Tim Klingbiel called the album a “work of raw beauty, captivating in its vulnerability and upfront with its emotion”, noting that “this is a powerful, haunting and direct record, and Srsen lets us into her world without reservation. For that we should feel privileged.” René Schaefer, reviewing for Mess + Noise, said the album was “a surprisingly varied, but entirely self-consistent solo album, beholden to no one and nothing other than one woman’s passion and imagination.” Jane Gazzo named Adalita the best Australian album of 2011 on news.com.au.

=== Accolades ===
Adalita received the Australian Independent Record (AIR) Award for 'Best Independent Album' in 2011. Adalita was also nominated in the categories of Best Independent Artist and Breakthrough Independent Artist. The album was also nominated for the Australian Music Prize in 2011 and earned Adalita a nomination for Best Female Artist in the 2011 ARIA Awards.

== Track listing ==
All tracks are written by Adalita, except where noted.

No.	Title	Length
1.	"Hot Air"	6:42
2.	"Perfection"	5:05
3.	"The Repairer"	4:33
4.	"Jewel Thief"	7:09
5.	"Invite Me"	4:57
6.	"Good Girl"	3:52
7.	"Lassa Hanta" (Adalita, Raúl Sánchez)	3:57
8.	"Fool Around"	3:42
9.	"Goin Down"	5:41
10.	"Night Orchid"	4:02

iTunes Deluxe Version
No.	Title	Length
11.	"Lonesome" (Maurice Frawley)	5:19
12.	"Hot Air" (video)	3:59

2014 Vinyl Re-issue Bonus Tracks
No.	Title	Length
11.	"Fur Seal"	3:08
12.	"Taxi Club" (Adalita, Raúl Sánchez)	3:22

== Charts ==
Year	Chart	Position
2011	ARIA Album Chart	23

== Personnel ==
Credits for Adalita adapted from liner notes.

Musicians

- Adalita – vocals, guitar, percussion, piano, drums
- J.P. Shilo – violin on "Perfection", lead guitar, drums on "Jewel Thief", drums, slide guitar on "Good Girl", spooky guitar on "Goin Down" and "The Repairer«, drum machine on "Goin Down"
- Raúl Sánchez– shimmer slide guitar on "Lassa Hanta"
- Amaya Laucirica – backing vocals on "Good Girl"

Technical personnel

- Dean Turner – producer
- Adalita – producer
- Brent Punshon – recording, mixing
- Lindsay Gravina – mastering
