= Young & Full of the Devil =

Young And Full of the Devil

Studio album by Magic Dirt
- Released: April 1998
- Recorded: 1997
- Studio: Birdland Studios
- Genre: Alternative rock
- Label: Au Go Go Records
- Producer: Lindsay Gravina, Magic Dirt

Magic Dirt chronology
| Friends in Danger (1996) | Young And Full of the Devil (1998) | What Are Rockstars Doing Today (2000) |

Singles from Young & Full of the Devil
- 1. "Rabbit with Fangs" Released: 1997; 2. "She-Riff" Released: 1998

Young And Full Of The Devil is the second studio album by Australian rock band Magic Dirt. Released in April 1998 on Au Go Go Records, it marked the studio debut of guitarist Raúl Sánchez, who joined following the mid-1997 departure of Dave Thomas. Recorded at Melbourne’s Birdland Studios with producer Lindsay Gravina, the album reached number 100 on the ARIA Albums Chart on initial release. A 25th-anniversary reissue campaign in April 2023 also returned the album to the national ARIA Top 100 at number 78.

== Background and recording ==
Following overseas label setbacks and the exit of guitarist Dave Thomas, Magic Dirt regrouped in Melbourne in 1997. Sánchez, whom vocalist–guitarist Adalita remembered from the local scene, moved into the band’s share house and began daily jams that led the group back into Birdland with Gravina. Sessions were completed quickly, around 12 days, and often stretched “15, 17 hours a day”, according to bassist Dean Turner. In later recollections, the band described the period as hedonistic—“just smoke joints, take acid and jam”. Speaking to Beat in April 1998, Adalita called Sánchez “the missing piece”, credited Gravina as “like the fifth member”, and discussed production experiments such as tracking “Shrinko” at a higher pitch then slowing the tape, plus extending the instrumental version of “Babycakes” with extra feedback layers.

In a 2007 Mess+Noise retrospective, Turner referred to Young And Full Of The Devil as “the drug record”, recalling that they jammed daily, and sessions at Birdland with Gravina were “like a party”, with “deliveries of mull cakes” and “a lot of drugs in the studio”. Turner called it his favourite Magic Dirt album “even though we didn’t take it seriously enough.” Adalita also recounted a late-session stunt in which the band tried to “blow up some little practice amps”. Gravina, “trashed like the rest of us”, produced a knife, slashing the amps and trying to set them alight, which she said typified his uncompromising “big daddy” studio presence.

== Composition and themes ==
While retaining the band’s noise-rock edge, Young And Full Of The Devil pushed toward a raw, confrontational style, alternating long dirges and sudden quiet passages with brief shocks of brevity. Turner characterised the lyrics as confronting and cathartic, while the band leaned into heavier textures than on Friends In Danger, yet retained exploratory, experimental elements. Gravina later described the record as “essentially an art record… a last hurrah for a scene that had signalled its peak.”

== Release and promotion ==
Young And Full Of The Devil was delayed from its original February release date, arriving in April 1998. The album was issued in Australia by Au Go Go on CD and a limited vinyl pressing of 300 copies. Contemporary interviews highlighted the band’s renewed focus and chemistry with Sánchez ahead of release. The album was preceded by the single “Rabbit with Fangs” in November 1997 and followed by a re-recorded version of “She-Riff”, released as a single in 1998. The video for "She-Riff" paid homage to the 1975 Australian film Picnic At Hanging Rock

== Reception ==
Contemporary reviews were mixed to positive. In Rolling Stone Australia, Lauren Zoric was critical of the album’s lack of pop concessions, calling it “unsatisfying” and claiming the “massive guitar onslaughts get boring”. Conversely, Massive magazine awarded 4/5, praising its “ten explosive new songs” and live-wire energy that mirrored the band’s live performances. In March 1999, Juice framed the album’s intensity and risk-taking as central to Magic Dirt’s appeal, noting its non-radio-friendly bent and singling out “Babycakes” as the “best bit”. In retrospective commentary, Double J summarised the album’s commercial impact as modest amid a shifting late-1990s musical landscape, a lull that preceded the band’s pop-leaning resurgence on their follow up, What Are Rock Stars Doing Today, in 2000.

== 25th-anniversary reissue and tour ==
A remastered 25th-anniversary edition was announced in March 2023, released digitally on 17 March via the band’s Emergency Music imprint and on CD and vinyl on 7 April through Emergency Music/Remote Control Records. The campaign returned the album to ARIA charts, reaching number 78 on the ARIA Albums Chart and number 5 on the ARIA Top 20 Australian Artist Albums for the week commencing 17 April 2023.

In May 2023, the band announced an 18-date national tour to celebrate the album’s 25th anniversary. Presented by Double J, the shows featured Young And Full Of The Devil performed in full, followed by a selection of favourites.

== Track listing ==
1. "Babycakes" – 6:45
2. "She-Riff" – 5:06
3. "Rabbit with Fangs" – 2:40
4. "Shrinko" – 2:44
5. "What Have I Done?" – 3:09
6. "These Drugs Are Really Starting to Fuck Me Over" – 5:29
7. "Short Black" – 1:24
8. "X-Ray" – 7:05
9. "Ascot Red" – 7:22
10. "Babycakes You Always Freeze Me Up" – 18:27

== Charts ==
Chart performance for Young & Full of the Devil
| Chart (1998) | Peak position |
|---|---|
| Australian Albums (ARIA) | 100 |

2023 chart performance for Young & Full of the Devil
| Chart (2023) | Peak position |
|---|---|
| Australian Albums (ARIA) | 78 |

== Release history ==
Release history and formats for Young & Full of the Devil
| Country | Date | Format | Label | Catalogue |
|---|---|---|---|---|
| Australia | April 1998 | CD; LP | Au Go Go | ANDA237 |
| Various | 17 March 2023 | Digital download | Emergency Music | |
| Australia | 7 April 2023 | CD; LP | Emergency Music | EMERGENCY010 |
