= Friends in Danger =

Studio album by Magic Dirt
- Released: September 1996
- Recorded: Sydney, Australia
- Genre: Alternative rock
- Length: 45:44
- Labels: Warner Bros. Au Go Go Records
- Producers: Magic Dirt, Paul McKercher

Magic Dirt chronology
Magic Dirt (1995)	Friends in Danger (1996)	Young & Full of the Devil (1998)

Singles from Friends in Danger
- 1. "Heavy Business"/"Shovel" Released: 1996; 2. "Sparrow" Released: 1997

Friends in Danger is the debut studio album by Australian rock band Magic Dirt. Released in Australia by Au Go Go in September 1996 and by Warner Bros. in the United States later the same year, the record marked a deliberate move toward a darker, noisier sound than the band's earlier EPs. It is the group's only studio album to feature guitarist Dave Thomas. The album originally peaked at number 25 on the ARIA Albums Chart in 1996; following a 25th-anniversary reissue on 9 July 2021 via Emergency Music / Remote Control Records, it re-entered the chart and reached a new peak of number 10—higher than its original 1996 placement.

== Background ==
Magic Dirt formed in Geelong, Victoria, in 1992 after an earlier incarnation as the Jim Jims, with a line-up of Adalita Srsen (vocals, guitar), Dean Turner (bass), Adam Robertson (drums) and Daniel Herring (guitar). They quickly drew attention from Australian labels Fellaheen and Au Go Go, leading to the single “Super Tear” (1993) and the EPs Signs of Satanic Youth (1993) and Life Was Better (1994). By 1995, U.S. A&R interest peaked: Warner Bros. executive Geoffrey Weiss pursued the band, even as Herring signalled his departure. The group signed the U.S. deal with Warner Bros. and recruited long-time Geelong figure Dave Thomas (ex-Bored!). Thomas later said the group kept their U.S. deal with Warner separate from their Australian relationship with Au Go Go and resisted A&R attempts to reshape a song into “some kind of MTV mega-hit”. Their first U.S. album, however, was the self-titled compilation Magic Dirt (1995) on Dirt Records, which combined the Australian EPs Signs of Satanic Youth and Life Was Better (along with the track "Goofy Gumb").

Ahead of the album the band released the I Was Cruel 10″ single, which signalled a shift away from the accessibility of the early EPs. The single was Daniel Herring's last recording with the band, and featured the words "Thank you, Daniel. Goodbye" etched onto the vinyl. The single appeared in Australia on Au Go Go in February 1996; a U.S. pressing followed on Man's Ruin in October 1996.

== Writing and recording ==
Interviews around the release describe a conscious reaction against the tunefulness of the first two EPs. Adalita cited Kyuss's Blues For The Red Sun as an influence, saying that the band listened to that record "obsessively" before recording Friends In Danger. She said the band wanted the songs “connected… through some kind of spiritual link… a feeling or a mood”, and that the running order was laboured over so the record would play like “chapters in a book”. Dave Thomas noted that the group recorded largely live to analogue with minimal overdubs to preserve a warm, imperfect “live feel”. The album was recorded and mixed in about ten days at Megaphon Studios in Sydney with producer Paul McKercher. “Dylan’s Lullaby” was written for drummer Adam Robertson's infant son during the sessions. "I Was Cruel" was re-recorded for the album with Adalita saying, "The one on the album's got a different feel. It's got the feel of the album. It's got the darker feel, the lurking feel." During mixing, the band pulled out “really weird sounds” that they had not noticed while tracking. Thomas also experimented with effects (including a “Golden Throat” talkbox), contributing to the record's detuned, heavy texture. The song “Fear” was pieced together in the studio from piano and delayed-bass textures with buried vocals to create a “mysterious element”.

According to bassist Dean Turner, the band “consciously held the album back until [they] signed” with Warner, saying that Friends in Danger was recorded on “an Au Go Go budget of $20,000.” When Warner's Geoffrey Weiss heard the completed sessions, he deemed the album “impenetrable and difficult” for casual listeners and offered to fund additional recording; the band refused and the album proceeded unchanged.

Turner later characterised Friends in Danger as “our fight record,” recalling severe internal tensions: “we hated each other... it sounds like a bunch of musos who aren’t listening to what each other are playing,” with Adalita and Turner's relationship “in a bad way,” Thomas “not [slipping] into his role… as a collaborator,” and Robertson “drifting along in his own world.”

== Composition and style ==
Contemporary coverage characterised the record as brooding and noise-leaning. Form Guide called it “very dark at times,” noting three instrumental tracks out of the album's ten, and energy that is “subtle, like a cat sneaking up on a bird … [before] the cat eventually pounces.” In the U.S., Rolling Stone praised its “ragged-feedback glory”, balancing “low, ugly amp rumble” with “lightly clanging arpeggios”, and drew comparisons with early Sonic Youth and Hole. Adalita told the Sydney Morning Herald that the band initially did not intend to release any singles, viewing the tracks as inseparable “chapters”, and considered none overtly radio-friendly.

== Release and promotion ==
Friends in Danger appeared in Australia in September 1996, with a U.S. edition later that year. The band originally planned a crowd shot as the album cover; however, U.S. legal concerns forced them to change the cover image. A promotional only double A-side single for "Heavy Business/Shovel" was released in Australia in 1996. The band toured nationally and promoted the single “Sparrow,” released commercially in Australia and the U.S. in 1997. In late 1996 Magic Dirt toured the U.S. with Archers of Loaf, but Warner devoted little promotional effort to the album there, and the band were subsequently dropped by the label.

== Reception ==
Reviews were generally favourable. Form Guide argued the record “doesn’t grab you on the first listen” but rewards persistence, while David Fricke of Rolling Stone praised its guitar dynamics and Adalita's vocals, adding that the band “simply go for the heart – and then have your jugular for dessert.”. Australian rock music historian Ian McFarlane said "[it] matched the band's fearless experimentation with a dark, unhinged sound that went from moments of eerie near-silence to full-tilt guitar noise"

Writing for Juice, John O’Donnell called it “a visionary blast of noise, attitude and great songs… [capturing] the raw power of this awesome live band." Matt Ashare of The Boston Phoenix wrote that it was “as good and as purely cathartic as art-damaged, noise-mongering, amp-frying rawk gets,” while Tracks observed “torn and fractured beauty… light and shade… and passages of almost frightening intensity,” and Barry Divola of Who cautioned, “don’t listen to this album by yourself with the lights out.”

The album was described by Mushroom Music as "a dark, brooding and heavy as all hell slab of sludge/slacker rock." The record's darker approach confounded some fans who discovered the band via the more accessible Life Was Better EP, but cemented Magic Dirt's reputation for uncompromising noise-rock. Over time the record developed a cult following among Australian alternative-rock listeners.

Professional ratings
Review scores
Source	Rating
Allmusic	3/5 stars
Rolling Stone	3/5 stars

== Commercial performance and aftermath ==
Upon its release in 1996, Friends in Danger peaked at number 25 on the ARIA Albums Chart.Triple J later reported Australian sales of around 10,000 copies for Friends in Danger. Turner recalled that Friends in Danger became “the lowest selling album that Geoffrey Weiss has ever been involved in,” and that the band “collected hundreds and thousands of dollars US” when Warner paid out the remainder of the two-album U.S. contract rather than release a second record; “we literally never recorded a song specifically for them, but they paid us for two albums.” The group then continued independently, with Raúl Sánchez replacing Thomas in 1997.

== 2021 reissue ==
A 25th-anniversary reissue of Friends in Danger was released on 9 July 2021 via Emergency Music / Remote Control Records, on vinyl, CD and digital formats. The band dedicated the reissue to guitarist Dave Thomas, who died in 2020. Following its release, the album re-entered the ARIA Albums Chart and reached a new peak of number 10 in the week commencing 19 July 2021, its first Top Ten placement.

== Track listing ==
All tracks are written by Magic Dirt.

No.	Title	Length
1.	"Friends In Danger"	4:45
2.	"Heavy Business"	2:13
3.	"Pristine Christine"	4:42
4.	"Bodysnatcher"	8:20
5.	"Dylan's Lullaby"	2:30
6.	"Sparrow"	3:23
7.	"Shovel"	4:22
8.	"Fear"	3:29
9.	"Befriended Fallen Angel"	5:08
10.	"I Was Cruel"	6:55
Total length:		45:44

== Charts ==
Chart (1996)	Peak position
Australian Albums (ARIA)	25

Chart (2021)	Peak position
Australian Albums (ARIA)	10

== Release history ==
Country	Date	Format	Label	Catalogue
Australia	September 1996	CD	Au Go Go Records	ANDA206CD
USA	1996	CD; LP; Cass	Warner Bros.	946276-1 / 946276–2
Australia	9 July 2021	CD; LP	Remote Control Records / Emergency Music	EMERGENCY009CD
