= Girl (Magic Dirt album) =

Studio album by Magic Dirt
- Released: July 2008
- Studio: Birdland Studios, Melbourne, Australia
- Genre: Alternative rock
- Length: 40:43
- Label: Emergency Music
- Producer: Magic Dirt, Lindsay Gravina

Magic Dirt chronology
| Beast (2007) | Girl (2008) | White Boy (2009) |

Singles from Girl
- 1. "Romy" Released: June 2008; 2. "White Boy" Released: 2008

Girl is the sixth studio album by Australian alternative rock band Magic Dirt. The album was released on 5 July 2008. The album features ten new songs already familiar to their fans from rigorous road testing on tours through the past year.

To promote the album, the band embarked on their biggest national tour to date; completing a 42-date run across Australia between July and December 2008.

== Track listing ==
All songs written & arranged by Magic Dirt.

1. "Get Ready to Die" - 2:25
2. "Emerald Green" - 2:26
3. "Romy" - 3:38
4. "Six Feet Under" - 3:38
5. "Always" - 4:29
6. "White Boy" - 5:25
7. "Full of Rope" - 3:36
8. "Tremor" - 2:29
9. "Cupids Bow" - 8:17
10. "More" - 5:43

== Charts ==
The album was released on 5 July 2008, and debuted at number 7 on the Australian Independent Music chart.

== Personnel ==
- Adalita Srsen – vocals, guitar, piano
- Dean Turner – bass, vocals
- Adam Robertson – drums
- Raúl Sánchez – guitar, vocals

== Release history ==
| Country | Date | Format | Label | Catalogue |
|---|---|---|---|---|
| Australia | 5 July 2008 | CD; Digital download | Emergency Music | EMERGENCYMUSIC004 |
