= Beast (Magic Dirt album) =

Studio album by Magic Dirt
- Released: July 2007
- Studios: Birdland Studios, Melbourne, Australia
- Genre: Alternative rock
- Length: 28:04
- Label: Emergency Music
- Producers: Magic Dirt, Lindsay Gravina

Magic Dirt chronology
| Roky's Room (2007) | Beast (2007) | Girl (2008) |

Singles from Beast
- 1. "Bring Me the Head Of..." Released: July 2007

Beast is a mini-album by Australian alternative rock band Magic Dirt. It was released in July 2007.

== Reception ==
Reviews for Beast were mostly positive. The mini-album was greeted as their best work in years, a return to blistering form, as the band threw off any shackles.

JB HiFi's description of the EP is "Beast is a collection of 7 of the Dirt's most intense psycho-drama workouts. The lyrics take you to some dark places and force you to take a look around. This is their dirtiest primal grind yet."

== Track listing ==
All songs written and arranged by Magic Dirt.

1. "Horror Me" – 5:13
2. "Bring Me the Head of..." – 3:23
3. "Dirty One" – 2:45
4. "Don't Panic" – 5:22
5. "Hung" – 4:05
6. "Lead Room" – 5:01
7. "Sucker Love" – 5:38

== Personnel ==
- Adalita Srsen - Vocals, Guitar, Piano
- Dean Turner - Bass, Vocals
- Adam Robertson - Drums
- Raúl Sánchez - Guitar, Vocals

== Release history ==
| Country | Date | Format | Label | Catalogue |
|---|---|---|---|---|
| Australia | 3 July 2007 | CD; Digital download | Emergency Music | EMERGENCYMUSIC002 |
