= Life Was Better =

EP by Magic Dirt
- Released: 21 November 1994
- Recorded: 1994
- Studios: Birdland Studios, Melbourne, Australia
- Genres: Grunge, alternative rock
- Length: 30:07
- Label: Au Go Go

Magic Dirt chronology
Signs of Satanic Youth (1993)	Life Was Better (1994)	Friends in Danger (1996)

Life Was Better is the second extended play release by Australian rock band Magic Dirt. It was released in November 1994 on the Melbourne independent label Au Go Go Records. The EP debuted at No. 1 on Australia's alternative chart, where it remained for 75 weeks. It peaked at number 71 on the Australian singles chart, selling over 20,000 copies. At the ARIA Music Awards of 1995, the EP was nominated for four awards; Best New Talent, Best Independent Release, Breakthrough Artist – Single and Best Alternative Release. In 2020, the EP was re-released on CD and vinyl and it entered the Australian albums chart at number 26.

== Background and recording ==
After the release of their debut EP, Signs of Satanic Youth in 1993, and a heady succession of touring with the likes of Sonic Youth, Smashing Pumpkins, Beck and Jon Spencer Blues Explosion, Magic Dirt weathered the hysteria of 'the next big thing' tag and a storm of major label interest by breaking up and getting back together four times. After regrouping for good and hiring help in the way of management and an agent, Magic Dirt reconvened in the middle of 1994 to record Life Was Better.

Life Was Better was recorded at Birdland Studios in Melbourne with engineer/producer Lindsay Gravina, capturing the band’s abrasive guitar squall and pop sensibility. In interviews at the time, the band described the sound as "continuing our tradition of noise pollution" and even jokingly as "heaven metal".

Adalita reflected in on the recording in 2007, saying that both Signs of Satanic Youth and Life Was Better were, "recorded under much the same circumstances. We were recording in Melbourne at Birdland with Lindsay Gravina and there was a 24-hours Coles over the road. For me that was bright lights, big city! It was an insane amount of fun".

The cover art for Life Was Better was heavily influenced by Aussie cult movie Puberty Blues, with which the band were obsessed.

== Release and promotion ==
Life Was Better was issued by Au Go Go on CD on 21 November 1994, with "Ice" serviced to radio and an accompanying video.

Following its release, the band featured heavily on alternative press and garnered a national spot on the 1995 Big Day Out tour. They went on to support Hole, Silverchair and Dinosaur Jr throughout 1995. Late in 1995, they signed a record deal with Warner Bros. in the U.S.

== Reception ==
In November 1994, OTS said "Geelong's favourite sons (and daughter) do it again, with five tracks of pure alterno magic... this is a guaranteed indie hit and one of the archetypal Australian releases of the year." In December 1994, D.D. Forte called the EP "the kind of feedback-laced gutter pop to knock the loneliness out of your head". In January 1995, Tracey Grimson from OTS said "It's clear that Magic Dirt take their lessons from a combination of the punk of new indie mixed with the roots of older alternative rock... What rises up is hard, heavy, contagious rock 'n' roll – a new breed." In December 1995, Nazz from Rip It Up said "It sounds like something sweet, like The Bangles... as covered by an air conditioner and a cement mixer".

In 2020, Jeff Jenkins from Stack Magazine said Life Was Better "...shows a band that should have conquered the world. Adalita Srsen sits comfortably alongside Chrissy Amphlett as a rock goddess.". Trouser Press singled out "Amoxycillin", which "starts as a brash pop song and closes with a ten-minute feedback concerto", comparing the band’s power to Daydream Nation-era Sonic Youth.

== Track listing ==
No.	Title	Length
1.	"Daddy"	4:14
2.	"Ice"	3:21
3.	"Amoxycillin"	14:55
4.	"Fairy Park"	2:37
5.	"He Man"	5:00

== Personnel ==
- Adalita Srsen – vocals, guitar
- Dean Turner – bass
- Adam Robertson – drums
- Daniel Herring – guitar

== Charts ==
Chart (1995)	Peak position
Australia Singles (ARIA)	71
Chart (2020)	Peak position
Australian Albums (ARIA)	26

== Accolades ==
Year	Organisation	Category	Nominated work	Result	Ref(s)
1995	ARIA Awards	Best Independent Release	Life Was Better	Nominated	
1995	ARIA Awards	Best Adult Alternative Album	Life Was Better	Nominated	
1995	ARIA Awards	Best New Talent	Life Was Better	Nominated	

== Release history ==
Country	Date	Format	Label	Catalogue
Australia	21 November 1994	CD	Au Go Go Records	ANDA167
Australia	17 January 2020	CD; streaming; digital download; Ltd Edition LP	Emergency Music	EMERGENCY008CD / EMERGENCY008LP
