= Tough Love (Magic Dirt album) =

Studio album by Magic Dirt
- Released: August 2003
- Studio: Birdland Studios, Melbourne
- Length: 48:31
- Label: East West Records
- Producer: Lindsay Gravina

Magic Dirt chronology
What Are Rock Stars Doing Today (2000)	Tough Love (2003)	Snow White (2005)

Singles from Tough Love
- 1. "Plastic Loveless Letter" Released: November 2003; 2. "All My Crushes" Released: 2004

Tough Love is the fourth studio album by Australian rock band, Magic Dirt. It was released in August 2003, it peaked at number 15 on the ARIA Charts; becoming the band's highest charting album.

The album was promoted with a national tour, appearances on multiple TV and radio shows, as well as playing supports for acts including The Foo Fighters, Queens of the Stone Age, Red Hot Chili Peppers, Swervedriver, The Beasts of Bourbon, Powderfinger and Jet.

At the ARIA Music Awards of 2003 the album was nominated for three awards; Best Rock Album and Best Cover Art, losing out to Vulture Street by Powderfinger. Lindsay Gravina was nominated for Engineer of the Year for his work on this album.

In 2005, the band reflected on the recording of the album. Adalita Srsen said "Tough Love was so regimented and there was a lot of discipline... We talked about every single thing, we worked really hard in the studio, we had tuning problems, I had difficulties singing. It all sounds great in the end but there was so much trial by fire and so much discipline which we'd never really encountered before; never put ourselves through before. So after all of that I guess we were a little bit burnt-out, a little bit tired and wanted to just relax a bit.". Dean Turner added "We found out it was a shit way to write music. We set goals for ourselves and at the end of the record we had achieved those goals. But it's not a very fun way to make music so we'll never do a record like that again."

== Release and reception ==
Professional ratings
Review scores
Source	Rating
Sydney Morning Herald	3/5 stars

"Vulcanella" and "Watch Out Boys" were issued as promotional singles, before the first official single, "Plastic Loveless Letter" was released in November 2003, where it became the band's first top 40 single.

== Track listing ==
All songs written by Magic Dirt.

Tough Love

1. "Girlboy" - 3:05
2. "Last Night" - 2:21
3. "Watch Out Boys" - 3:24
4. "Vulcanella" - 4:19
5. "Tee Vee" - 3:01
6. "All My Crushes" - 3:55
7. "Drunk for You" - 3:36
8. "That's Negative Baby" - 3:14
9. "Plastic Loveless Letter" - 4:12
10. "Worry" - 3:58
11. "Anita's Miracle Suntan Lotion" - 2:35
12. "Brat" - 7:24
13. "The Kiss" - 3:33

Tough Love (Bonus DVD)

1. "In the Studio"
2. "On the Road"
3. "Hotel Life"
4. "Backstage Pass"
5. "Babycakes" (Live at Channel [V]) - 6:22
6. "Touch That Space" (Live at Channel [V]) - 8:08
7. "Dirty Jeans" (Live at Channel [V]) = 3:34
8. "Smoulder" (Live at Channel [V]) - 3:46
9. "Pace It" (Live at Channel [V]) - 3:23

Triple J Live at the Wireless (2004 re-release bonus disc)

- Recorded live on the Triple J rooftop, in Sydney on 25 August 2003.
1. "Girlboy" - 3:44
2. "Anita's Miracle Suntan Lotion" - 2:55
3. "All My Crushes" - 4:48
4. "Watch Out Boys" - 3:34
5. "Vulcanella" - 4:33
6. "That's Negative Baby" - 3:46
7. "Pace It" - 3:37
8. "The Kiss" - 3:47
9. "Pristine Christine" - 12:22

== Charts ==
Chart (2003)	Peak position
Australian Albums (ARIA)	15

== Release history ==
Country	Date	Format	Label	Catalogue
Australia	August 2003	CD	East West Records	2564606292
Australia	August 2003	CD + Bonus DVD	East West Records	2564605112
Australia	April 2004	2x CD	East West Records	5046722762
