= Magic Dirt (US Version) =

Compilation album by Magic Dirt
- Released: 1995
- Studio: Birdland Studios, Melbourne, Australia
- Genre: alternative rock, Indie rock
- Label: Dirt Records

Magic Dirt chronology
Life Was Better (1994)	Magic Dirt (1995)	Friends In Danger (1996)

Magic Dirt is a compilation album by Australian alternative rock band Magic Dirt. It was released in the U.S. on New York label, Dirt Records in 1995. It compiles the band's first two Australian-released EPs Signs of Satanic Youth and Life was Better along with additional track "Goofy Gumb".

== Reception ==
Professional ratings
Review scores
Source	Rating
Allmusic	4/5 stars

Nitsuh Abebe from AllMusic said "Australia's Magic Dirt managed to secure some impressive touring partners in the mid 1990s, sharing stages with bands like Sonic Youth, Pavement and Dinosaur Jr. While the sloppy, distorted rock of their self-titled album doesn't have a whole lot in common with these first two bands, there is some appeal of J. Mascis and company lurking in the overdriven riffs and loosely pop melodies packed into Magic Dirt. The album doesn't seem quite as vital or impressive as those of Dinosaur Jr., or those of a lot of American indie bands for that matter, but the same underlying aesthetic makes Magic Dirt a reasonably appealing listen.".

== Track listing ==
All compositions by Magic Dirt

1. "Eat Your Blood" - 5:34
2. "He-Man" - 4:57
3. "Ice" - 3:17
4. "Supertear" - 4:08
5. "Daddy" - 5:59
6. "Goofy Gumb" - 4:13
7. "Fairy Park" - 2:38
8. "Choker" - 4:06
9. "Touch That Space" - 7:03
10. "Redhead" - 4:48
11. "Amoxycillin" - 14:51

== Release history ==
Country	Date	Format	Label	Catalogue
USA	1995	CD; Cassette	Dirt Records	DRT021
