= Music Victoria Awards of 2013 =

Annual Australian music awards ceremony

- Date: 20 November 2013
- Venue: Billboards, Melbourne, Victoria

Highlights
- Most wins: The Drones, Paul Kelly (2)

The Music Victoria Awards of 2013 are the eighth Annual Music Victoria Awards and consist of a series of awards, culminating on 20 November 2013. Previously known as The Age EG Awards, 2013 was the first year under the title Music Victoria Awards.

== Hall of Fame inductees ==
- Renée Geyer and Michael Gudinski

Renée Geyer was the first solo female artist to be inducted into the Music Victoria Hall of Fame. Geyer said "As a Melbourne girl, getting inducted into the Hall of Fame by Music Victoria and the best newspaper in Australia means a lot to me."

Michael Gudinski was inducted by Molly Meldrum as a recognition of Mushroom Records's 40th anniversary and to acknowledge his enormous contribution to the Victorian music industry.

== Award nominees and winners ==
=== All genre Awards ===
Winners indicated in boldface, with other nominees in plain.

Best Album	Best Song
**Paul Kelly - Spring and Fall**; Adalita - All Day Venus; Dick Diver - Calendar Days; The Drones - I See Seaweed; Big Scary - Not Art	**Vance Joy - "Riptide"**; Standish/Carlyon - Nono/Yoyo; King Gizzard & the Lizard Wizard - "Head On/ Pill"; Courtney Barnett - "History Eraser"; Cash Savage and the Last Drinks - "I'm in Love"
Best Male	Best Female
**Paul Kelly**; Archie Roach; David Bridie; Gotye; Mikelangelo	**Adalita**; Courtney Barnett; Evelyn Morris (Pikelet); Jen Cloher; Kylie Auldist
Best Band	Best Emerging Artist
**The Drones**; Clairy Browne & The Bangin' Rackettes; Dick Diver; King Gizzard & the Lizard Wizard; Saskwatch	**Hiatus Kaiyote**; Andras Fox; Brighter Later; Damn Terran; Fraser A. Gorman
Best Live Band	Best Venue
**The Drones**; Bombay Royale; Clairy Browne & the Bangin' Rackettes; Harmony; Money for Rope	**The Corner Hotel**; The Caravan Club; The Forum; The Old Bar; The Toff in Town
Best Regional Venue	Best Regional Act
**Theatre Royal, Castlemaine**; Karova Lounge, Ballarat; Meeniyan Town Hall, South Gippsland; The Barwon Club, Geelong; The Bridge, Castlemaine	**Stonefield**; Gold Fields; Hunting Grounds; Quarry Mountain Dead Rats; Yacht Club DJs
Best Festival	
**Meredith Music Festival**; All Tomorrow's Parties / I'll Be Your Mirror; Boogie; Golden Plains Festival; Sugar Mountain	

=== Genre Specific Awards ===
Best Blues Album	Best Country Album
**Three Kings - Three Kings**; Chris Russell's Chicken Walk - Shakedown; Chris Wilson & Geoff Achison - Box of Blues; Nick Charles - Into the Blues; Russell Morris - Sharkmouth	**Dan Waters - La Vita E'Bella**; Doug Bruce - Made That Way; Nigel Wearne - Black Crow; Raised By Eagles - Raised By Eagles; Sweet Jean - Dear Departure
Best Soul, Funk, R'n'B and Gospel Album	Best Jazz Album
**Kylie Auldist - Still Life**; Hiatus Kaiyote - Tawk Tomahawk; Judex Rose - Afro Soul Power; Sweethearts - Bar Roma; The Cactus Channel - Wooden Boy	**Allan BrowneTrio - Lost in the Stars**; Andrea Keller - Family Portraits; Menagerie - They Shall Inherit; Murphy's Law - Big Creatures and Little Creatures; Origami - Karaoke
Best Hip Hop Album	Best Electronic Act
**Fraksha - My Way**; Dr. Flea - Keep on Moving; Flu - FluSeason; Known Associates - Ashes to Dust; Must Volkoff - White Russian	**Nick Thayer**; Client Liaison; Dune; Sunshine; Tornado Wallace (aka Lewie Day)
Best Heavy Album	Best Indigenous Act
**King Parrot - Bite Your Head Off**; Apart From This - In Gloom; Batpiss - Nuclear Winter; Ooga Boogas - Ooga Boogas; White Walls - White Walls	**Crystal Mercy**; Archie Roach; Dan Sultan; Kutcha Edwards; Yung Warriors
Best Global or Reggae Act	Best Experimental/Avant-Garde Act
**Melbourne Ska Orchestra**; Afrobiotics; Airileke Ingram; The Public Opinion Afro Orchestra; Zulya and the Children of the Underground	**Judith Hamann**; Aviva Endean; Dave Brown; Mark Groves; Nik Kennedy
Best Folk Roots Album	
**Archie Roach - Into the Bloodstream**; Shane Howard - Other Side of the Rock; The Idle Hoes - Tomorrow Morning; The Mae Trio - Housewarming; Tinpan Orange - Over the Sun	
