= Dirty Jeans =

Single by Magic Dirt

from the album What Are Rock Stars Doing Today
- Released: July 2000
- Recorded: 2000
- Studio: Festival Studios
- Length: 3:41
- Label: EastWest / Warner Music Australasia
- Songwriter(s): Magic Dirt
- Producer(s): Phil Vinall

Magic Dirt singles chronology
"Expectations" (1999)	"Dirty Jeans" (2000)	"Pace It" (2001)

"Dirty Jeans" is a song by Australian alternative rock band Magic Dirt. The song was released in July 2000 as the lead single from the band's third studio album What Are Rock Stars Doing Today. The single peaked at number 68 in Australia, becoming the band's first charting single.

The song polled in position 12 in the Triple J Hottest 100, 2000.

== Background and release ==
In the early stages of writing the band's third studio album, lead singer Adalita Srsen had dealt with a lot of angst and emotionally raw issues in the previous releases and was now in a different headspace. In 2018, Srsen reflected with Double J saying "I just wanted to write happy stuff and poppier, upbeat stuff". On a train ride home one night, Adalita said she jotted down some lyrics and chords to a new song. Days later, sifting through her recorder, intending to show bassist Dean Turner another song, the cassette stopped at her rough version of "Dirty Jeans". Turner asked her what it was and Adalita was dismissive of the song. She said "I was a bit sceptical about 'Dirty Jeans' and I was not sold on that song for a long time.". The band's excitement ramped up when they decided they could have a heap of fun, hamming things up with the sound of the song. The song was released in July 2000. Adalita says "It's brought us so much abundance, fans and great shows. It's done so much for us, just that one song, so we owe a lot to it, even though it's just this cute funny, anomaly.".

== Reception ==
Mushroom music described the song as "anthemic guitar pop smash". Double J said "With its bright pop hooks, handclaps and Ronettes inspiration shining through, you can understand why 'Dirty Jeans' remains one of Magic Dirt's most subversive moments."

Junkee said Magic Dirt, "captured the grimy Aussie suburban existence better than most bands in the '90s, and "Dirty Jeans", with its mountains of guitar fuzz and Adalita's classic laconic vocal, will raise hairs on your neck and draw eyeliner on your eyes."

== Track listings ==
CD Single
No.	Title	Writer(s)	Length
1.	"Dirty Jeans"	Magic Dirt	3:41
2.	"Kidbug"	Magic Dirt	2:57
3.	"Supernova" (from the Looking for Alibrandi soundtrack)	Liz Phair	2:36

== Charts ==
Chart performance for "Dirty Jeans"
Chart (2000)	Position
Australia (ARIA)	68

== Release history ==
Region	Date	Format	Label	Catalogue
Australia	July 2000	CD Single	EastWest, Warner	85738479221
