= Signs of Satanic Youth =

Signs Of Satanic Youth

EP by Magic Dirt
- Released: November 1993
- Studios: Birdland Studios, Melbourne, Australia
- Length: 59:42
- Label: Au Go Go

Magic Dirt chronology
Signs Of Satanic Youth (1993)	Life was Better (1994)

Signs of Satanic Youth is the debut extended play by Australian rock band Magic Dirt. It was released in November 1993 on the Melbourne-based, independent label Au Go Go Records.

== Background and recording ==
Magic Dirt emerged from the early-1990s Geelong scene and quickly graduated from feedback-driven improvisations to songs, drawing comparisons to Sonic Youth and Dinosaur Jr., and supporting Sonic Youth and Pavement on their 1993 Australian tours.

Earlier in 1993 the band released the single "Supertear" on Fellaheen, an offshoot of Waterfront Records, backed with "Sea". Speaking in 2007, Turner said the five songs on Signs of Satanic Youth were “literally the first five” the band had written, with momentum pushed along by management and Au Go Go founder Bruce Milne.

The EP was recorded at Birdland Studios with engineer Lindsay Gravina, while Dave Thomas (Bored!) mentored the band in the studio. Sessions were fast—“we ended up finishing everything in about five days,” singer-guitarist Adalita recalled—and the group assembled the handmade artwork themselves at guitarist Daniel Herring’s house. In 2019, Adalita recalled "...It's funny but I have such strong memories of putting together the artwork. We all gathered around at Daniel's house, an old weatherboard shack in the marshlands at the back of Geelong. We spent hours and hours assembling all the bits and pieces and drawing and sketching and deliberating and fine tuning. That's how we were, passionate and attentive to every little detail, everything had meaning, everything had to be right, from cutting out those little paper horns to Dean's drawing of the piranha like fish. Being our first EP we were pretty damn excited as you can imagine."

== Composition and style ==
Retrospective reviews highlight the EP’s collision of sludge-psych guitars and mosh-pit dynamics, with Turner’s basslines acting as a “gear shift” on tracks such as “Eat Your Blud,” “Supertear” and “Choker,” and Adalita’s restless vocals foregrounded. Trouser Press framed early Magic Dirt as setting “the melodies back up while retaining the fury,” a balance reflected in the EP’s harsher passages and hooks.

== Reception ==
Professional ratings
Review scores
Source	Rating
Allmusic	3/5 stars
Pitchfork	7.2/10 stars

Contemporary mainstream coverage focused on the band’s live intensity and Geelong roots. Retrospective reviews were strongly positive. Pitchfork praised the 2019 reissue as “a potent encapsulation of alternative rock in the early 1990s,” highlighting the dynamic contrasts and Adalita’s performances, while Trouser Press situated the group’s early work within a noise-pop lineage. Jeff Jenkins from Stack Magazine said the EP "was an uncompromising mix of blazing guitars and attitude." He said, "twenty-five years after it was released, Signs of Satanic Youth still burns with a raging intensity, and it's a blistering reminder of the glory days of the early '90s when the alternative became the mainstream.".

Double J grouped Signs of Satanic Youth with Life Was Better among “white hot EPs” central to Australian ’90s alt-rock.

== Release history ==
Signs of Satanic Youth was released by Au Go Go Records in November 1993 on double 7" and CD. The EP was re-released via Emergency Music / Remote Control Records in January 2019 on CD and 12" vinyl, and appeared on streaming services for the first time. Upon the re-release, Magic Dirt said "The reissue of Signs of Satanic Youth is particularly significant as it was a project spearheaded by Dean (Turner) and was a long held dream of his that we are now so proud to be able to realise. To have it available to the public after almost 25 years and for the first time on 12" vinyl is a momentous occasion for the band and we are so happy to be able to share this part of our legacy." The 2019 edition standardised a six-track running order with updated timings, including a 9:27 edit of the untitled closer, compared with the extended indexing (36:46) on the original 1993 CD release. To support the reissue, Magic Dirt undertook Australian dates from December 2018 through March 2019.

== Legacy ==
Signs of Satanic Youth is widely regarded as the blueprint for Magic Dirt’s formative sound and for Geelong’s early-’90s heavy-guitar underground. Several tracks were later paired with material from Life Was Better for the band’s self-titled U.S. compilation, broadening Magic Dirt’s international profile. The 2019 reissue prompted renewed critical appraisal and revived interest in the band’s early catalogue.

== Track listing ==
All tracks are written by Magic Dirt.

=== CD ===
No.	Title	Length
1.	"Eat Your Blud"	4:10
2.	"Supertear"	4:31
3.	"Touch That Space"	5:37
4.	"Choker"	4:06
5.	"Redhead"	4:32
6.	"(Untitled)"	36:46

=== Double 7" ===
Side A
No.	Title	Length
1.	"Eat Your Blud"	5:35

Side B
No.	Title	Length
1.	"Touch That Space"	5:37

Side C
No.	Title	Length
1.	"Red Head"	4:27

Side D
No.	Title	Length
1.	"Choker"	4:06
2.	"Fearless Fly"	1:15

=== 12" (2019 re-release) ===
Side A
No.	Title	Length
1.	"Eat Your Blud"	5:35
2.	"Supertear"	4:31
3.	"Touch That Space"	5:37

Side B
No.	Title	Length
1.	"Choker"	4:07
2.	"Redhead"	1:15
3.	"(Untitled)"	9:27

== Personnel ==
Magic Dirt

- Adalita Srsen – vocals, guitar
- Daniel Herring – guitar
- Dean Turner – bass
- Adam Robertson – drums

Additional credits

- Lindsay Gravina – engineering (Birdland Studios)
- Dave Thomas – studio mentoring / production assistance

== Release history ==
Country	Date	Format	Label	Catalogue
Australia	November 1993	CD; 2x7" LP	Au Go Go Records	ANDA167
Australia	18 January 2019	CD; streaming; digital download	Emergency Music	EMERGENCY007CD
Australia	19 April 2019	12" LP	Au Go Go Records	Emergency Music
