= Bleak Squad =

Australian indie-rock supergroup

- Origin: Melbourne, Victoria, Australia
- Years active: 2025–present
- Label: Poison City Records
- Spinoff of: Magic Dirt, Dirty Three, Mess Esque, Art of Fighting
- Members: Adalita Srsen; Mick Harvey; Mick Turner; Marty Brown

Bleak Squad are an Australian supergroup formed in Melbourne, Victoria. The band comprises Adalita Srsen (Magic Dirt), Mick Harvey (The Birthday Party, Nick Cave & The Bad Seeds, PJ Harvey), Mick Turner (Dirty Three, Mess Esque), and Marty Brown (Art of Fighting). Their debut album, Strange Love, was released on 22 August 2025 by Poison City Records, preceded by the singles "Lost My Head" and "Strange Love".

== History ==
Drummer and producer Marty Brown first floated the idea in 2019, calling the others “to maybe collaborate”. The four began jamming and recording ideas “on and off” over several years as schedules allowed. Each member brought songs or riffs. “Straight away we clicked” in a “really low pressure” environment, Adalita recalled, and they soon “ended up having a record” and “suddenly we’re a band”. Brown later described conceiving the group “sitting around Fitzroy Pool one summer”, recognising that the four shared a way of making music that was “uncomplicated and instantaneous”. Adalita coined the name Bleak Squad, saying it “speaks to both this loose collection of misfits and the noir-ish mood of our music”.

The quartet initially recorded at Melbourne’s Head Gap studio with engineer/producer Rohan Sforcina. Sessions were kept deliberately spontaneous, often learning a song once, running it down and then recording the second take. The album was then completed at Standalone Studios in Melbourne.

The band announced their formation with a free download of the track, "Everything Must Change" in May 2025. The first single "Lost My Head" arrived in June 2025 alongside the album announcement and initial tour dates. Strange Love was released on 22 August 2025 via Poison City Records.

The band’s first run of shows included warm-up shows in regional Victoria in August and headline dates in October 2025 at City Recital Hall in Sydney and the Melbourne Recital Centre, plus a performance at Tasmania’s Unconformity festival. Reviewing the Sydney City Recital Hall show, writer Mark Mordue praised the band’s "sorrow-joys and slow-burn melodies", urging readers to "go see them… Warm yourself on their rock ’n’ roll sorrow-joys and slow-burn melodies; the intimate way they’re amused, hurt and inspired".

In December 2025 the band announced a new single, "Black & White", alongside a national run of shows for February–March 2026. The two-track 7" single, backed with "A Suitcase in Berlin", was released on 6 February 2026 via Poison City Records; both songs originated during the Strange Love sessions.

== Musical style and reception ==
Bleak Squad’s sound has been described as noir-rock and indie/art rock, with shared songwriting and alternating lead vocals from Adalita and Harvey. The Guardian praised Strange Love as "a genuine collaboration" that "sounds more like a fourth album than a first". Backseat Mafia called the album "a deliciously dark collection" and awarded it 9.2/10.

== Members ==
- Adalita Srsen – lead vocals, guitar
- Mick Harvey – bass, guitar, keyboards, backing vocals
- Mick Turner – guitar
- Marty Brown – drums, percussion, keyboards

== Discography ==
=== Studio albums ===
Title	Details	Peak chart positions
Title	Details	AUS
Strange Love	Released: 22 August 2025; Label: Poison City; Formats: LP, CD, digital	40

== Awards and nominations ==
=== Australian Music Prize ===
The Australian Music Prize (the AMP) is an annual award of $50,000 given to an Australian band or solo artist in recognition of the merit of an album released during the year of award. It commenced in 2005.

Year	Nominee / work	Award	Result	Ref.
2025	Strange Love	Australian Music Prize	Nominated	
