= All Day Venus =

Studio album by Adalita
- Released: 20 September 2013
- Recorded: 2013 at Birdland Studios, Melbourne
- Genre: Alternative rock
- Label: Liberation Music
- Producer: Lindsay Gravina

Adalita chronology
Adalita (2011)	All Day Venus (2013)

Singles from All Day Venus
- 1. "Warm Like You" Released: 12 August 2013

All Day Venus is the second studio album by Australian musician Adalita. It was released by Liberation Music on 20 September 2013.

== Background and history ==
Adalita first announced that she was writing for a new album via her blog in March 2012. The album was written and demoed throughout 2012 at various locations, including Melbourne, Sydney and Smiths Lake on the New South Wales central coast. This was, reportedly, a period of self-examination and personal growth for Adalita, with many of the songs centring on the 'disintegration of romantic relationships'. She also expressed that she wanted to work with a band for this album, marking the first time she's done so since Magic Dirt went on indefinite hiatus in 2010.

Adalita announced on her Facebook page, in April 2013, that work had started on the album at Birdland Studios in Melbourne, with long-time Magic Dirt producer Lindsay Gravina. Matt Bailey (Paradise Motel) played bass on the album, while three different drummers – Jim White from Dirty Three, Hugo Cran of The Devastations and Lee Parker of Spite House – all contributed to the album. Also playing on the album is violinist, Willow Stahlut, whom Adalita encountered busking in Melbourne’s Bourke Street Mall and invited into the studio. Mixing of the album was completed in July 2013.

In June, Adalita appeared on Australian television program RocKwiz and performed a track from the new album, entitled "I Want Your Love", a track that she has been playing live since 2010. In July 2013, she previewed the track "All Day Venus" and announced a small run of Australian east coast shows to preview the new material. During the first show, at The Tote venue in Melbourne, Victoria, she announced that the album is also titled All Day Venus.

She told tonedeaf.com.au that the album “[is] louder, and there’s much more distortion, the songs are bigger; there’s a lot more going on even though I’ve still kept that minimal aesthetic.” She also stated that she chose Lindsay Gravina to produce the album because “he knows my evolution as a songwriter and how to bring out my best. Working solo is way more intense and I feel like I can really trust him with my music; something I don’t readily do. It’s certainly hard to get past my guard. But Lindsay can do it.”

On 8 August, music website mess+noise announced that All Day Venus would be released on 20 September 2013. The album artwork and track listing were also revealed. The website also featured a link to the album's first single, 'Warm Like You', which premiered on Triple J the same day.

== Reception ==
Professional ratings
Review scores
Source	Rating
The Music	4/5 stars
The AU Review	9/10 stars
BMA Magazine	4/5 stars
The Sydney Morning Herald	3/4 stars
Rip It Up	4/5 stars

All Day Venus received generally positive reviews from critics upon its release. Justine McNamara, reviewing for The AU Review, called the album "a refreshingly honest and raw album, just what Australian music needs at the moment". 4ZZZ called it, "Another album of thundering, alternative rock. Continues to remind me of a more shoegaze version of Concrete Blonde's Johnette Napolitano."

== Track listing ==
All songs written by Adalita

No.	Title	Length
1.	"Annihilate Baby"	5:28
2.	"I Want Your Love"	3:30
3.	"Warm Like You"	3:30
4.	"Trust Is Rust"	4:27
5.	"All Day Venus"	4:48
6.	"He Wrote"	4:13
7.	"Blue Sky"	3:52
8.	"Too Far Gone"	5:09
9.	"Homesick"	4:44
10.	"My Ego"	4:01
11.	"Heavy Cut"	4:36
12.	"Rolled In Gold"	6:44

== Charts ==
Chart (2013)	Peak position
Australian Albums (ARIA)	30

== Personnel ==
Credits for All Day Venus adapted from liner notes.

Musicians

- Adalita – vox, guitar, piano, percussion
- Jim White – drums on track 6 & 9
- Lee Parker – drums on track 1, 3, 5, 7 & 10
- Hugo Cran – drums on track 2, 4, 8 & 12
- Matt Bailey – bass
- Willow Stahlut – violin

Technical personnel

- Lindsay Gravina – producer, mixing
- Adalita – producer
- Victor Van Vugt – mixing
- Steve Smart – mastering
