= White Boy (EP) =

EP by Magic Dirt
- Released: 6 November 2009
- Length: 36:40
- Label: Emergency Music

Magic Dirt chronology
Girl (2008)	White Boy (2009)

White Boy is the fifth extended play release by Australian rock band Magic Dirt. It was released independently in November 2009 and remains the band's final release.

== Background and release ==
Professional ratings
Review scores
Source	Rating
WebCuts	7.5/10 stars

The EP was originally released to coincide with Magic Dirt's October 2009 Australian tour, but has become something of a sad epitaph for this much-loved Melbourne rock band with news of the passing of bassist and co-founder Dean Turner in late August 2009.

Turner founded Magic Dirt in 1992 and played bass in the band until he died on 21 August 2009. Magic Dirt had planned a tour in August but Turner's deteriorating condition led to its cancellation. Following Turner's death, the band agreed to complete run of shows in October and November in 2009. At these shows, the band gave out DVDs of recent video clips to fans for free. Magic Dirt said "It was Dean's idea to giveaway the first 100 copies of the DVD to our fans at the live shows. Dean felt it was vital to include our audience as part of the whole creative process and it was important for him to give something back to the fans. Dean was deeply pragmatic and always thinking ahead. We wish to honour his hard working spirit with these shows, to unite with our audience that has so deeply shown their respect, appreciation and love for Dean and his music."

The tour coincided with the release of an EP White Boy, which includes final recording projects Turner had assembled. The title track is taken from the band's recent album Girl. The remaining five track bring together a selection of new, unreleased and rare material including duets with Gareth Liddiard of The Drones and Rowland S. Howard of The Birthday Party. "Deep In a Net of Red" and "Valley of the Rose" are both from the Girl sessions. "Future Fuck" is from the limited edition 2008 free tour EP.

== CD track listing ==
No.	Title	Length
1.	"White Boy"	5:24
2.	"Summer Heigh" (featuring Rowland S. Howard)	5:25
3.	"Deep In the Net of Red"	4:22
4.	"Love Is the Armour" (featuring Gareth Liddiard)	7:04
5.	"Valley of the Rose"	3:46
6.	"Future Fuck"	10:36

== Release history ==
Country	Date	Format	Label	Catalogue
Australia	6 November 2009	CD; digital download	Emergency Music	EMERGENCY006
USA	17 November 2009	CD; digital download	Metropolitan Groove Merchants	EMERGENCY006
