= Snow White (album) =

Studio album by Magic Dirt
- Released: September 2005
- Studio: Birdland Studios, Melbourne
- Length: 41:58
- Label: East West Records
- Producer: Lindsay Gravina, Rob Long

Magic Dirt chronology
Tough Love (2003)	Snow White (2005)	Roky's Room (2007)

Singles from Snow White
- 1. "Locket" Released: 2005; 2. "I Love the Rain" Released: 2005

Snow White is the fifth studio album by Australian rock band, Magic Dirt. It was released in September 2005 and peaked at number 24 on the ARIA Charts. The album saw the return of some of the bands noisier elements fused with their hooky and polished songwriting.

The album is said to incorporate a range of sounds from 19th century choral symphonies to 20th century film soundtracks to the latest albums by Bjork, Nick Cave and theredsunband.

At the ARIA Music Awards of 2006 Lindsay Gravina and Magic Dirt were nominated for Producer of the Year for their work on this album.

== Release and reception ==
The Age said "The beautiful cover art immediately sets a contradictory tone by featuring red roses, and the songs include smatterings of country, doo-wop and girly pop alongside their more typical hard-edged sounds. It's easily their most diverse and accessible album yet."

== Track listing ==
All songs written by Magic Dirt.

1. "Feels Like a Demon" - 3:19
2. "Snow White" - 3:57
3. "Locket" - 3:03
4. "Grab Your Hair" - 4:42
5. "Envious" - 3:43
6. "I Love the Rain" - 3:55
7. "Dyin'" - 4:16
8. "Sleep" - 4:19
9. "Mother's Latest Fear" - 5:48
10. "Tiger Eyes" - 4:56

== Charts ==
Chart (2005)	Peak position
Australian Albums (ARIA)	24

== Release history ==
Country	Date	Format	Label	Catalogue
Australia	September 2005	CD; LP	East West Records	5046-78979
