= The Public Opinion Afro Orchestra =

- Origin: Melbourne
- Genre: Afrobeat
- Years active: 2008 -

The Public Opinion Afro Orchestra is a Melbourne-based band which performs Nigerian funk in the vein of Fela Kuti. The band was founded by DJ Manchild, Zvi Belling and Tristan Ludowyk. The band has varying membership that can be up to 19 members. Their album Do Anything Go Anywhere was nominated for 2010 ARIA Award for Best World Music Album.

== Discography ==
=== Albums ===
Title	Details	Peak positions
Title	Details	AUS
Do Anything Go Anywhere	Released: March 2010; Label: Public Opinion Afro Orchestra (POAO-002); Formats: CD	—
Naming & Blaming	Released: 2018; Label: HopeStreet Recordings (HS032CD); Formats: CD, LP, digital	—

=== Extended plays ===
Title	Details	Peak positions
Title	Details	AUS
Two Sides of the Truth (featuring Tumi)	Released: 2009; Label: Public Opinion Afro Orchestra (POAO-001); Formats: 12" LP	—

== Awards and nominations ==
=== ARIA Music Awards ===
The ARIA Music Awards is an annual awards ceremony that recognises excellence, innovation, and achievement across all genres of Australian music. They commenced in 1987.

Year	Nominee / work	Award	Result	Ref.
2010	Do Anything Go Anywhere	Best World Music Album	Nominated	

=== Music Victoria Awards ===
The Music Victoria Awards are an annual awards night celebrating Victorian music. They commenced in 2006.

Year	Nominee / work	Award	Result	Ref.
2013	The Public Opinion Afro Orchestra	Best Global or Reggae Act	Nominated	
2019	The Public Opinion Afro Orchestra	Best Intercultural Act	Nominated	
