= Vertical Hold =

Australian musical group

- Origin: Adelaide, South Australia
- Genres: Rock; Pop; New wave
- Years active: 1980–1985
- Labels: RCA; WEA
- Past members: Mick Michalopoulos (lead vocals, guitar), Jim Mountzouris (bass, vocals), Noel Forth (drums), Hilary Frost (cello)

Vertical Hold was an Australian musical group formed in Adelaide, South Australia. Active from 1980 to 1985, the band achieved regional success in South Australia with several radio hits and one nationally charting album.

Their debut single, "My Imagination", released in late 1981, reached number 50 on the national Kent Music Report chart and was a number one hit in Adelaide. This was followed by "Tears of Emotion" in 1982, which peaked at number 58 nationally, and "Shot Down (In Love)" in 1983, which reached number 85. A 16 mm music video for the latter was directed by filmmaker Scott Hicks.

The band released one studio album, Vertical Hold, in March 1984, which reached number 88 on the Kent Music Report albums chart.

In 1985, the group renamed themselves The Gladiators (without cellist Hilary Frost) and contributed the track "Strange Love" to the RCA compilation album S.A. Brewing.

Lead singer Mick Michalopoulos (also referred to as "Miki") died in 2016. His sons, Yianni and Jim Michalopoulos, formed the Melbourne alternative rock band Society of Beggars.

== Discography ==
=== Studio albums ===
List of albums, with Australian chart positions
Title
Vertical Hold
Album details
* Released: March 1984

 * Format: LP, Cassette  
 * Label: WEA (250260–1)  

AUS
88

=== Singles ===
List of singles, with Australian chart positions
Year	Title	AUS	Album
1981	"My Imagination"	50 (SA #1)	non-album single
1982	"Tears of Emotion"	58 (SA #3)	non-album single
1983	"Shot Down (In Love)"	85 (SA #28)	Vertical Hold
1984	"United States of America"	–	Vertical Hold
