= What Are Rock Stars Doing Today =

Studio album by Magic Dirt
- Released: October 2000
- Recorded: Sydney, Australia
- Studio: Festival Studios
- Length: 45:44
- Label: East West Records
- Producer: Phil Vinall

Magic Dirt chronology
Young & Full of the Devil (1998)	What Are Rock Stars Doing Today (2000)	Tough Love (2003)

Singles from What Are Rock Stars Doing Today
- 1. "Dirty Jeans" Released: July 2000; 2. "Pace It" Released: 2001; 3. "Supagloo" Released: 2001; 4. "City Trash" Released: 2002

What Are Rock Stars Doing Today is the third studio album by Australian rock band, Magic Dirt. It was their first on East West Records label, released in October 2000, it peaked at number 35 on the ARIA Charts.

At the ARIA Music Awards of 2001 the album was nominated for Best Alternative Release, losing out to Wires by Art of Fighting.

== Background ==
In the 1990s, Magic Dirt had a number of loud, alternative rock releases and they had toured endlessly. But, with the decline of grunge and the rise in popularity of hip hop and electronica-based acts by the end of the decade, Magic Dirt had lost their manager and label, and feeling burnt out, the band also found themselves asking each other, should we continue. Lead singer Adalita was sure of one thing, that the previous decade was one in which she dealt with a lot of angst and emotionally raw issues and that she was now in a different headspace. She told Double J "I just wanted to write happy stuff and poppier, upbeat stuff.". The band went into the studio and recorded What Are Rock Stars Doing Today, with an emphasis on the melodic pop side of their songwriting. Adalita reflected saying "It was totally our second phase as a band, our second rising. We were mid career, we still had a lot of steam, a lot of energy, a lot of writing to do."

== Track listing ==
All songs written by Magic Dirt.

What Are Rock Stars Doing Today

1. "City Trash" - 3:36
2. "Teenage Vampire" - 3:45
3. "Dirty Jeans" - 3:41
4. "Pace It" - 3:26
5. "Competition Girl" - 3:44
6. "Nightingale" - 3:04
7. "Rockstars" - 3:44
8. "Come On the Scene" - 3:44
9. "Supagloo" - 2:21
10. "For a Second" - 6:13
11. "Smoulder" - 3:44

UK Bonus Disc

1. "Now Or Never" - 4:21
2. "Isotope" - 2:47
3. "Rebel" - 2:10
4. "Takin' It All Wrong" - 4:47
5. "Ice" (Peel Sessions, 1997) - 4:07
6. "Heavy Business (Peel Sessions, 1997) - 2:29
7. "Pace It" (Video Clip) - 3:47
8. "Touch That Space" (Live Clip from Big Day Out 2002) - 8:09
9. "Smoulder" (Live Clip from Big Day Out 2002) - 3:46
10. "Teenage Vampire" (Live Clip from Big Day Out 2002) - 4:31
11. "She Riff" (Live Clip from Big Day Out 2002) - 5:50

== Charts ==
Chart (2000)	Peak position
Australian Albums (ARIA)	35

== Release history ==
Country	Date	Format	Label	Catalogue
Australia	October 2000	CD; Limited LP	East West Records	8573850032
United Kingdom	2002	2xCD; 2xLP	Sweet Nothing Records	SNCD016 / SNLP016
