= Society of Beggars =

Australian alternative rock band

- Origin: Adelaide, South Australia, Australia
- Genres: Alternative rock; psychedelic rock
- Years active: 2010s–present
- Label: Independent
- Members: Yianni Michalopoulos; Dimitrios (Jim) Michalopoulos; Tom "Dibi" Di Biase; Zoë Alexa
- Website: www.societyofbeggars.com

Society of Beggars is an Australian alternative rock band based in Melbourne, Victoria. Formed by brothers Yianni and Dimitrios (Jim) Michalopoulos, along with drummer Tom "Dibi" Di Biase and later, bassist Zoë Alexa, the group formed in Adelaide before relocating to Melbourne in the 2010s, developing a sound that blends dark psychedelia and classic rock influences. They released their debut EP, An EP Called Night, in 2017. Their first full-length album, Levitator, was released in 2024 and received positive reviews from Australian and international music media.

== History ==
=== Early career ===
Society of Beggars formed in Adelaide before relocating to Melbourne, drawn to the city's alternative music scene. Yianni and Jim Michalopoulos are the sons of Mick Michalopoulos, guitarist and vocalist of the 1980s Adelaide band Vertical Hold. Their early influences included acts such as The Doors, Tom Waits, and Nick Cave and the Bad Seeds. In 2017, the band released their debut EP, An EP Called Night, produced by Lindsay Gravina at Birdland Studios.

=== Singles (2019–2023) ===
In 2019, the group released the single "God Mode", which explored themes of loss and resilience. Later singles such as "Well of Wishes" and "All the Houses Have Their Lights On" received coverage in music publications, with Beat Magazine noting that "Well of Wishes" captured the band's style. Glide Magazine characterised "All the Houses Have Their Lights On" as a dark rock ballad with atmospheric production.

=== Levitator (2024) ===
The band's debut studio album, Levitator, was released on 28 November 2024 and produced by Lindsay Gravina at Birdland Studios. The album was heavily influenced by the death of the Michalopoulos brothers' father, which informed its themes of grief, mortality, and healing. Obscure Sound described the release as a cohesive alternative rock record that channels emotional weight into its instrumentation.

Beat Magazine noted its blend of classic rock and post‑punk stylings. Happy Mag commented on its lyrical arrangements and thematic focus on personal loss. The album also received positive coverage from AAA Backstage, regarding the album's songwriting.

In early 2025, the band promoted the album with the Levitator Tour, performing at intimate venues across Australia including Melbourne, Sydney, and Brisbane, with a notable album launch at The Old Bar.

== Musical style and influences ==
Society of Beggars' music blends elements of alternative rock, post-punk, and dark psychedelia. Reviewers have compared their sound to artists like Nick Cave and Tom Waits, citing their theatrical arrangements and lyrical introspection. Their visual and musical aesthetic incorporates elements of noir fiction and classic rock.

== Tours ==
=== A Tour Called Night (2016) ===
National tour across Victoria, New South Wales, and South Australia in support of single "An Angel Called Night".

=== Old Haunts Tour (2017) ===
Shows in Warrnambool, Melbourne, and Adelaide alongside the release of the "Old Haunts" single and music video.

=== God Mode Tour (2019) ===
Organised in conjunction with the release of the single "God Mode".

=== Levitator Tour (2025) ===
National tour supporting their debut album, Levitator, including shows in Melbourne, Sydney, and Brisbane.

== Discography ==
=== EPs ===
- An EP Called Night (2017)

=== Studio albums ===
- Levitator (2024)

=== Selected singles ===
- "God Mode" (2019)
- "Dance The Evil" (2021)
- "Lick" (2022)
- "Well of Wishes" (2023)
