= Plastic Loveless Letter =

Single by Magic Dirt

from the album Tough Love
- Released: November 2003
- Recorded: 2003
- Studio: Birdland Studios, Melbourne
- Length: 4:12
- Label: EastWest / Warner Music Australasia
- Songwriter(s): Magic Dirt
- Producer(s): Lindsay Gravina

Magic Dirt singles chronology
"City Trash" (2002)	"Plastic Loveless Letter" (2003)	"All My Crushes" (2004)

"Plastic Loveless Letter" is a song by Australian alternative rock band Magic Dirt. Following the promotional singles "Vulcanella" and "Watch Out Boys", the song was released as the official lead single from the band's fourth studio album Tough Love in November 2003. The single peaked at number 34 in Australia, becoming the band's highest charting single after becoming a radio staple.

The song polled in position 35 in the Triple J Hottest 100, 2003.

== Track listings ==
CD Single
No.	Title	Writer(s)	Length
1.	"Plastic Loveless Letter"	Magic Dirt	4:12
2.	"Sunlight"		3:59
3.	"Love Me"		6:01
4.	"Too Much Is Not Enough" (by Adalita and Ben Nash)		4:10

== Charts ==
Chart (2003)	Peak position
Australia (ARIA)	35

== Release history ==
Region	Date	Format	Label	Catalogue
Australia	November 2003	CD Single	EastWest, Warner	2564609872
