= Rooms for the Memory =

1987 single by Michael Hutchence

Single by Michael Hutchence

from the album Dogs in Space
- B-side: "Golf Course"
- Released: January 1987
- Recorded: 1986
- Studio: Richmond Records
- Length: 5:00
- Label: WEA
- Songwriter(s): Ollie Olsen
- Producer(s): Nick Launay

Michael Hutchence singles chronology
| "Speed Kills" (1982) | "Rooms for the Memory" (1987) | "A Straight Line" (1999) |

"Rooms for the Memory" is a song recorded by the Australian Michael Hutchence for the soundtrack to the 1986 film, Dogs in Space. "Rooms for the Memory" peaked at #11 on the Australian singles chart.

== Track listing ==
7-inch single

1. "Rooms for the Memory" – 5:00
2. "Golf Course" – 2:47

== Charts ==
Chart performance for "Rooms for the Memory"
| Chart (1987) | Peak position |
|---|---|
| Australia (Australian Music Report) | 11 |

== 2023 release ==
In January 2023, Adalita, Mick Harvey and Andrew Duffield recorded a cover version as a tribute to the song-writer Ollie Olsen who was diagnosed with Multiple System Atrophy in 2020. The single performed by Adalita was released on 16 June 2023.

The song's executive producer, Jane Gazzo said "It's just a hauntingly brilliant and beautifully written song and when myself and a few of Ollie's friends heard he was not well, we felt we needed to do something to help. Remarkably all the musicians, including Adalita and Mick Harvey were completely up to donating their time and had belief in the project. I think this is a stunning rework and I really hope the music industry and public get behind it and give it the new lease of life we know it deserves." The EP is scheduled for release on 14 July 2023. The song peaked at number 1 on the Australian Independent Record singles chart.

== Track listings ==
Digital download

1. "Rooms for the Memory" (performed by Adalita) – 4:18

Digital download, vinyl and CD

1. "Rooms for the Memory" (2023 radio edit; performed by Adalita) – 4:18
2. "Rooms for the Memory" (2023 remix; performed by Michael Hutchence) – 5:06
3. "Rooms for the Memory" (2023 full version; performed by Adalita) – 4:33
4. "Win-Lose" (2023 version; performed by Kav Tamperley) – 3:18
5. "Win-Lose" (Dogs in Space version; performed by Ollie Olsen) – 4:54
6. "Rooms for the Memory" (Kraus mix; performed by Adalita) – 5:45
