= Magic Dirt =

Australian rock band

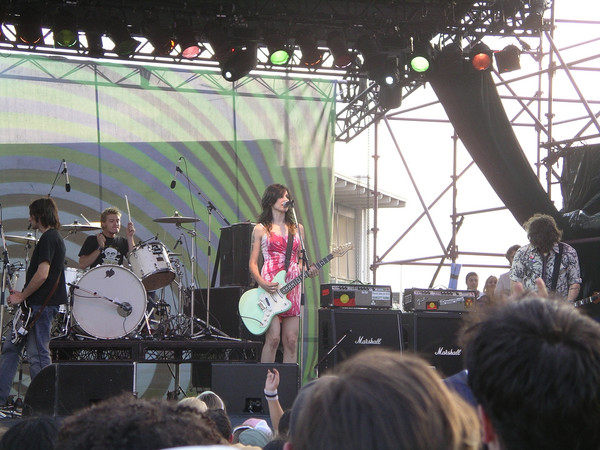
- Magic Dirt performing at Big Day Out in 2004

Background information
- Also known as: The Jim Jims
- Origin: Geelong, Victoria, Australia
- Genres: Alternative rock, grunge
- Years active: 1991–2010, 2018–present
- Labels: Fellaheen, Dirt, Au Go Go, Shock, Warner, Cargo, Various, Emergency
- Members: Adalita Srsen; Raúl Sánchez; Steve Patrick; Andre Fazio
- Past members: Dean Turner; Daniel Herring; Dave Thomas; Adam Robertson
- Website: www.magicdirt.com www.facebook.com/magicdirtofficialpage

Magic Dirt is an Australian rock band, which formed in 1991 in Geelong, Victoria, with Daniel Herring on guitar, Adam Robertson on drums, Adalita Srsen on vocals and guitar, and Dean Turner on bass guitar. Initially forming an alternative underground band called Deer Bubbles which split and formed into the much heavier, rock based group called The Jim Jims, they were renamed as Magic Dirt. Their top 40 releases on the ARIA Albums Chart are Friends in Danger (1996), What Are Rock Stars Doing Today (2000), Tough Love (2003) and Snow White (2005). They have received nine ARIA Music Award nominations including four at the ARIA Music Awards of 1995 for Life Was Better – their second extended play. Turner died in August 2009 of dermatofibrosarcoma protuberans (a soft tissue cancer). From 2010 to November 2018, the band were on hiatus.

== History ==
=== Early days (1991–1993) ===
Magic Dirt formed as Deer Bubbles in 1991 in Geelong, Victoria with Adalita Srsen on vocals and guitar, and Dean Turner on bass guitar. Within the same year, they started a new band, with transitory names such as "Detroit", "Brad" and "The Jim Jims", with guitarist Daniel Herring. Using the transitory name, "The Jim Jims", the band recorded a cover version of The Velvet Underground's "Heroin" for a Geelong compilation called Check This Action ... Let the Fun Begin, released in 1992. After the addition of drummer Adam Robertson, they became known as Magic Dirt. Srsen told a fanzine in 1996, "...we used to be in a band before Magic Dirt called Deer Bubbles. Dean knew Daniel from skating, and then he moved in with us, and we'd play like one song for forty minutes, we just loved it. Then we wanted to find a drummer, and we went through about five, then we found Adam through a mutual friend and that was it. We only used to have three songs we used to play for an hour".

Early in 1993, the band supported Sonic Youth and Pavement on their Australian tours. Later in the year, the band issued its debut single, "Supertear", for Fellaheen Records. By the time of its release in July, the band had broken up. However, they soon regrouped and signed with Au Go Go Records in November. Their first extended play, Signs of Satanic Youth appeared in December, with the track "Redhead" receiving airplay on Triple J radio.

=== The Au Go Go years (1994–1999) ===
==== Life Was Better EP ====
In April 1994, Magic Dirt split however, the group again reformed and released a second EP, Life Was Better in November. The EP included the tracks "Ice" and "Amoxycillin" and debuted at No. 1 on the Australian alternative music chart. It remained on that chart for 75 weeks, eventually selling 20,000 copies. Life Was Better went on to receive four nominations at the ARIA Music Awards of 1995.

In early 1995, the band performed on the Big Day Out festival tour across Australia, with Hole (Magic Dirt also supported their other Australian shows) and Silverchair. The success of Life Was Better had attracted international attention and Geoffrey Weiss, of Warner Music in the United States, traveled to Australia to see the band perform at the Big Day Out. Weiss negotiated a deal with their manager, Gavan Purdy and the band signed a two-album deal with Warner. In August 1995, Daniel Herring left the band. His final recording with the group was the 10" vinyl single, "I Was Cruel", which featured the words "Thankyou, Daniel. Goodbye" etched onto the vinyl. Dave Thomas, of fellow Geelong band Bored!, who had managed Magic Dirt at the early stages of their career, was recruited as Herring's replacement on guitar.

==== Friends in Danger ====
In late 1995, Dirt Records released the band's debut album in the US. The album was a compilation of their first two EPs, along with the track "Goofy Gumb", and titled simply Magic Dirt. In March, Magic Dirt began recording their debut album proper, Friends in Danger, in Sydney with Paul McKercher (You Am I) producing. The music style was a reaction to the accessibility of their earlier material. While Warner had expected more songs in the vein of "Ice", the band offered tracks like the 8-minute "Bodysnatcher". Warner were less than impressed, and went so far as to offer the band additional time and money to re-record the album. The band refused, and when Friends in Danger was released in September, the label put little effort into promoting it. According to rock music historian, Ian McFarlane, "[it] matched the band's fearless experimentation with a dark, unhinged sound that went from moments of eerie near-silence to full-tilt guitar noise". Friends in Danger peaked at No. 25 on the ARIA Albums Chart, and went on to sell 10,000 copies in Australia, helped along by "Sparrow", the album's most accessible track.

The group toured North America supporting Archers of Loaf and promoting Friends in Danger later in 1996. Warner still refused to promote the album and they were dropped by the label. Since the band had a two-album deal, Warner paid them for the second album, despite the fact that they did not release it.

==== Young & Full of the Devil ====
In January 1997, Magic Dirt again performed on the Big Day Out tour. In July, Thomas left and his replacement on guitar was Spanish-born Raúl Sánchez – former front man of Melbourne band, Muffcake. The group began recording its second full-length record, Young & Full of the Devil, at Birdland Studios with producer Lindsay Gravina. They followed with a three-week tour of the United Kingdom (where they appeared on John Peel's BBC radio show) and continental Europe in the later half of the year. Subway Records in Germany released an updated version of the band's US debut, with new artwork and two additional tracks. The group ended 1997 with a new single, "Rabbit with Fangs", and a national tour supporting Silverchair, playing large arenas around Australia.

April 1998 saw the release of Young & Full of the Devil, which peaked at No. 100. The album continued the unsettling, fuzzy sound of the debut, and sold 10,000 copies in Australia. Another single, "She-Riff" was released – in a new and more polished recording – with a video depicting Srsen re-enacting a scene from the 1975 Australian film Picnic at Hanging Rock.

Young & Full of the Devil was the last release by the band on Au Go Go Records. Turner and Srsen undertook two side projects. The first was Seaville - a project with Mérida Sussex from The Paradise Motel, which issued the Swan Song EP in 1998. The second project was with Ronin System, which resulted in the single, "Expectations" in 1999. Without a label, the band supported themselves by touring throughout much of 1999.

=== The East West years (2000–2006) ===
==== What Are Rockstars Doing Today ====
In 2000, Magic Dirt signed a recording contract with East West Records, and began recording their third album, What Are Rock Stars Doing Today with Phil Vinall (Placebo) producing. Released in October, What Are Rock Stars Doing Today reached the top 40. It signalled a dramatic shift in the band's sound. Gone were the fuzzy guitars and feedback. In its place was slick production and poppy hooks. Longtime fans of the band weren't sure what to make of lead single, "Dirty Jeans", with its hand claps and sing-a-long chorus. Tracks such as "Pace It" and "City Trash" proved that the band could still rock, however they did receive some backlash, with some fans labelling them "sell-outs". Triple J put "Dirty Jeans" on high rotation and it reached No. 12 in the year's Hottest 100. The year ended with a national tour supporting Powderfinger and Jebediah.

2001 and 2002 saw the band touring in the wake of What Are Rock Stars Doing Today. They launched their Love Ya & Leave Ya Tour - the largest the group had done up until that point – which saw them on their first trip to New Zealand. The City Trash Tour with The Nation Blue and Girls Against Boys followed in June–July 2002. They started recording demos for a fourth album early in the year – tracks such as "Love Me" and "Sarah May" from these sessions were later released as B-sides. Later that year, the band made its second trip to the UK, where What Are Rockstars Doing Today had been released on Sweet Nothing Records. In 2002, Magic Dirt appeared on the "World of Instruments" segment of John Safran's Music Jamboree, where they played "Dirty Jeans" using Indonesian gamelans – struck instruments including metallophones and xylophones.

==== Tough Love ====
In early 2003 Magic Dirt started recording its fourth album, Tough Love, at Birdland Studios in Melbourne, again produced by Lindsay Gravina. It was released in August and peaked at No. 15. It carried on the band's new slicker sound, although tracks like the epic "Brat" recalled the band's early days. Originally, no commercial singles were to be released from the album. After the success of the radio-only singles "Vulcanella" and "Watch Out Boys", "Plastic Loveless Letter" was officially released. It became the band's biggest hit to date, reaching No. 34 on the ARIA Singles Chart. Tough Love was nominated at the ARIA Music Awards of 2003 for Best Rock Album. It was re-issued in 2004 as two disc set containing their Live at the Wireless session on Triple J in 2003.

In 2004, Sánchez issued a solo album, Midnight Woolf, a self-recorded swamp blues instrumental release on his own Crossbone Recording Company. Sánchez formed the Midnight Woolf band and performed several gigs in Melbourne. In August, Turner produced the debut album, Peapod, for Sydney-based group, theredsunband.

==== Snow White ====
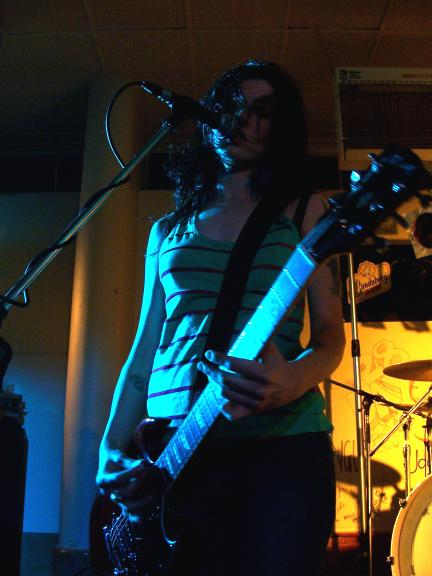
Magic Dirt's Adalita, live in 2005

In September 2005, Magic Dirt released their fifth studio album, Snow White, which peaked into the top 30. It received critical acclaim, as a combination of the band's pop sound, their noisy early material, and new elements such as acoustic guitars. Lead single "Locket" made an impact on radio and music video channels, but its exposure was limited due to the explicit language in the song's chorus. "I Love the Rain" followed as the second single from the album. Neither single charted into the top 50.

Speaking about the album, Snow White is far more mellow and less angst-ridden than 2003's Tough Love. Adalita Srsen told The Age "We're growing up more and you let go of those feelings, you're over and done with certain things and you don't go back there. So there's a lot of intense, deep feeling on the new record but it's not necessarily coming from an angry viewpoint. A lot of the album's about beauty and that's what I wanted to do, make a beautiful album."

Aside from joining the Big Day Out tour again in January and February, 2006 was a quiet year for the band. Sánchez continued his work with Midnight Woolf. He re-assembled the band in Spain for a series of gigs, and they released a second album, Electric Deluxe Graveyard Blues. Later in the year, two Magic Dirt tracks, "Sucker Love" (B-side to "Locket") and "Daddy" (from Life Was Better) appeared on the soundtrack for the Australian film Suburban Mayhem, plus a track from theredsunband, which had been produced by Turner. Also included were two solo contributions from Srsen, covers of "Sex Beat" and "Double Dare". "Double Dare" was released as a single in October. The tracks, produced by Mick Harvey (member of Nick Cave and the Bad Seeds, producer for PJ Harvey), were the first solo material to appear from Srsen. Turner, Harvey and Rowland S. Howard also played on the tracks.

=== Emergency Music (2006–2009) ===
After leaving East West, Magic Dirt created their own label, Emergency Music in 2006. In October, Srsen announced the band's future activities, in an interview on Triple J's breakfast show. The band would release an EP, a mini-album, and then an album. A report in Sydney street press Drum Media, indicated that the EP would be given away at shows and sold in selected independent music stores. The EP featured covers of The Scientists' "We Had Love" and Nick Cave and the Bad Seeds' "Stagger Lee", as well as a live re-recording of "Mother's Latest Fear" from Snow White.

In 2007, the band embarked on two separate projects; an experimental all noise album Roky's Room EP and a heavier dark rock mini album, Beast. Both were released on the band's own label Emergency Music in mid-2007. Beast harked back to the band's earlier, rawer material and featured original guitarist Herring on two tracks ("Horror Me" and a re-recording of "Sucker Love"). The single, "Bring Me the Head Of...", made little impact on radio, including Triple J, which had previously supported the band. The group spent the remainder of 2007 touring in support of Beast, including an East Coast tour with The Beasts Of Bourbon – who were often joined on stage by Srsen – and Rowland S. Howard.

In November 2007, the band began recording their sixth full-length album, Girl, which was released in July 2008. The album debuted at No. 7 on the Australian Independent Music chart. However, it did not reach the ARIA Albums Chart top 50. "Romy", lead single from the album, also failed to reach the related singles chart top 50. In support of the album, the group embarked on the No Sleep Til Christmas Tour, starting in July and ending in December 2008. The tour included dates in all major Australian cities, and a number of shows in regional centres. Playing bass on this tour was Melbourne musician Matt Sonic, as Turner was too ill to tour. To coincide with the tour, the band released a limited edition tour EP, available only at the shows. The second in a series of tour EPs (the first being the giveaway EP from 2006), the disc featured a cover of Hard-Ons' "Suck N Swallow", a collaboration with Gareth Liddiard of The Drones, two outtakes left over from Girl and a track recorded at Birdland Studios in 2003.

=== Death of Dean Turner and hiatus (2009–2011) ===
Dean Turner died on 21 August 2009 of dermatofibrosarcoma protuberans, a rare form of tissue cancer. He was 37 years old. Turner had been diagnosed nine years earlier. After Turner died, the band released a statement:

For nine years, Dean battled an extremely rare form of soft tissue cancer called dermatofibrosarcoma protuberans (DFSP). This cancer became life-threatening after it began to metastasize and cause various fatal tumours. Being a very private man, Dean chose to fight the cancer in a quiet and dignified manner. He displayed great courage and incredible stoicism. And above all else he had an unshakeable, positive attitude throughout his long ordeal. His composure and grace during this time will never be forgotten and are an inspiration to us all.

— Magic Dirt, Official Website

Following Turner's death Magic Dirt performed a final tour in honour of his memory, culminating in their appearance at the 2010 Big Day Out festival. They also released a six-track EP, White Boy, in November 2009. Srsen embarked on a successful solo career, while Sánchez formed a new band called River of Snakes.:

=== Reunion (2018–present) ===
In February 2018, Magic Dirt played a surprise small set at the end of an Adalita solo show at the Barwon Club in Geelong. In June 2018, the band were announced as a part of the 2019 Hotter Than Hell concert tour alongside Spiderbait, Shihad, Bodyjar and 28 Days. The band played their first official show since 2010 on November 18, 2018, at the River Rocks Rehab festival at the Barwon Club in Geelong.

In December 2018, the band were inducted into the National Live Music Awards Hall of Fame as the inaugural Live Legends. At the event, they told the crowd it was the first award of their career. February 2019 saw the band play alongside You Am I at Taronga Zoo Sydney, and in March as part of Golden Plains Festival with The Jesus and Mary Chain, Liz Phair, Happy Mondays and Four Tet. In late 2019, the band toured as part of the Scene and Heard festival alongside The Dandy Warhols, Jebediah, Wolfmother and Eskimo Joe.

The band were scheduled to perform at several festivals across Australia in 2020 and 2021, but many of these were cancelled or rescheduled due to the COVID-19 pandemic. The band later performed at several dates of the 2022 Spring Loaded Festival.

With a large portion of their back catalogue out of print, the band also announced in November 2018 that they would be reissuing their Signs Of Satanic Youth EP, on vinyl, CD and digitally, in January 2019. The reissue campaign continued with Life Was Better (available on vinyl and streaming services for the first time) in January 2020, a 20th anniversary edition of What Are Rocks Stars Doing Today in October 2020, and Friends In Danger in July 2021. The reissue of Friends In Danger reached number 10 on the ARIA Albums Chart, their highest chart entry to date. Young And Full Of The Devil was reissued for its 25th anniversary in April 2023, reaching 78 on the ARIA Albums Chart

In July 2022, the band embarked on their On The Road tour, their first headlining tour since reforming in 2018. The tour saw the band play several shows in New South Wales, along with dates in Canberra, Melbourne, Torquay and Adelaide. In June 2023, the band announced a national tour commemorating the 25th anniversary of Young and Full of the Devil, playing the album in full. In September 2023, the band released a cover of The Saints' "(I'm) Stranded", their first new music since 2009, for Mushroom Records 50th anniversary

== Members ==
Current members

- Adalita Srsen – vocals, guitar (1991–2010, 2018–present)
- Raúl Sánchez – guitar (1997–2010, 2018–present)
- Steve Patrick – bass (2018–present)
- Andre Fazio – drums (2023–present)

Former members

- Dean Turner – bass guitar (1991–2009; his death)
- Daniel Herring – guitar (1991–1995)
- Adam Robertson – drums (1992–2010, 2018–2022)
- Dave Thomas – guitar (1995–1997; died 2020)
- Matt Sonic – bass (2008–2010; touring)
- Dan McKay – drums (2022–2023; touring)

== Discography ==
=== Albums ===
==== Studio albums ====
List of studio albums, with selected chart positions
Title	Details	Peak chart positions
Title	Details	AUS
Friends in Danger	Released: September 1996; Label: Au Go Go (ANDA206); Formats: CD, cassette, LP	10 (Note: Friends in Danger originally peaked at number 25 in 1996. It reached its peak position of 10 Australia in July 2021.)
Young & Full of the Devil	Released: April 1998; Label: Au Go Go (ANDA237); Formats: CD, cassette	76 (Note: Young & Full of the Devil originally peaked at number 100 in 1998. It reached its peak position of 76 Australia in April 2023.)
What Are Rock Stars Doing Today	Released: October 2000; Label: East West (8573850032); Formats: CD, LP	35
Tough Love	Released: August 2003; Label: East West (2564606292); Formats: CD, CD+DVD	15
Snow White	Released: September 2005; Label: Warner Music Australia (5046786652); Formats: CD, LP, digital download	24
Roky's Room	Released: June 2007; Label: Emergency Music (003); Formats: CD, digital download	—
Beast	Released: 3 July 2007; Label: Emergency Music (002); Formats: CD, digital download	—
Girl	Released: 5 July 2008; Label: Emergency Music (004); Formats: CD, digital download	—

==== Compilation albums ====
List of compilation albums
Title	Details
Magic Dirt	Released: 1995 (US and Europe only); Label: Dirt Records (DRT021); Formats: CD, cassette

=== Extended plays ===
List of extended plays, with selected chart positions
Title	Details	Peak chart positions
Title	Details	AUS
Signs of Satanic Youth	Released: November 1993; Label: Au Go Go (ANDA167); Formats: CD, 7" LP	—
Life Was Better	Released: November 1994; Label: Au Go Go Records (ANDA180); Formats: CD, 12" LP	26 (Note: Life Was Better originally peaked at number 71 in 1994. It reached its peak position of 26 Australia in January 2020)
Magic Dirt	Released: October 2006; Label: Emergency Music (EMERGENCY001); Formats: Limited Edition CD	—
Magic Dirt	Released: August 2008 (Not sold in stores); Label: Emergency Music; Formats: 500 copies limited edition give away CD	—
White Boy	Released: October 2009; Label: Emergency Music (EMERGENCY006)	—

=== Singles ===
Title	Year	Peak chart positions	Album
Title	Year	AUS	Album
"Super Tear"	1993	—	Signs of Satanic Youth
"Redhead"	1993	—	Signs of Satanic Youth
"Ice"	1994	(Note: "Ice" was released as a radio-only single, thus ineligible to chart in 1994)	Life Was Better
"I Was Cruel"	1995	—	Non-album single
"Shovel"/"Heavy Business"	1996	—	Friends in Danger
"Sparrow"	1997	—	Friends in Danger
"Rabbit with Fangs"	1997	—	Young and Full of the Devil
"She-Riff"	1998	—	Young and Full of the Devil
"Supertear '98"	1998	(Note: "Supertear '98" was limited to 500 copies on 7" vinyl)	Non-album singles
"Expectations" (Ronin System featuring Magic Dirt)	1999	—	Non-album singles
"Dirty Jeans"	2000	68	What Are Rock Stars Doing Today
"Pace It"	2001	72	What Are Rock Stars Doing Today
"Supagloo"	2001	—	What Are Rock Stars Doing Today
"Magazine"/"I Want a Dog"	2001	(Note: "Magazine"/"I Want a Dog" was limited to 500 copies on 7" vinyl)	Non-album single
"City Trash"	2002	—	What Are Rock Stars Doing Today
"Vulcanella"	2003	(Note: "Vulcanella" was released as a radio-only single, thus ineligible to chart in 2003)	Tough Love
"Watch Out Boys"	2003	(Note: "Watch Out Boys" was released as a radio-only single, thus ineligible to chart in 2003)	Tough Love
"Plastic Loveless Letter"	2003	34	Tough Love
"All My Crushes"	2004	—	Tough Love
"Locket"	2005	51	Snow White
"I Love the Rain"	2005	—	Snow White
"Bring Me the Head Of"	2007	—	Beast
"Romy"	2008	—	Girl
"White Boy"	2008	—	Girl
"(I'm) Stranded"	2023	—	Mushroom: Fifty Years of Making Noise (Reimagined)

=== Album appearances ===
List of album appearances
Title	Year	Album
"Goofy Gumb"	1993	That Was Then, This Is Now
"My Pal"	1997	Idiot Box (soundtrack)
"Sparrow"	1997	Recovery: Hits from the Back Door
"Rabbit with Fangs"	1998	Triple J: Lust for Live
"Teenage Vampire" (demo)	2000	Hardcore Music in Ya Face!
"Supernova"	2000	Looking for Alibrandi (soundtrack)
"Who Made Me Who I Am" (with Richard Franklin)	2001	Corroboration

== Awards and nominations ==
=== AIR Awards ===
The Australian Independent Record Awards (commonly known informally as AIR Awards) is an annual awards night to recognise, promote and celebrate the success of Australia's Independent Music sector. (The commenced in 2006)

Year	Nominee / work	Award	Result	Ref.
2008	Girl	Best Independent Hard Rock/Punk Album	Nominated	

=== ARIA Music Awards ===
The ARIA Music Awards is an annual awards ceremony that recognises excellence, innovation, and achievement across all genres of Australian music. Magic Dirt have been nominated for 9 awards.

Year	Nominee / work	Award	Result	Ref.
1995	Life Was Better	Best New Talent	Nominated	
1995	Life Was Better	Breakthrough Artist - Single	Nominated	
1995	Life Was Better	Best Independent Release	Nominated	
1995	Life Was Better	Best Alternative Release	Nominated	
2001	What Are the Rock Stars Doing Today	Best Alternative Release	Nominated	
2003	Tough Love	Best Rock Album	Nominated	
2003	Adalita and Steven Gorrow for Tough Love	Best Cover Art	Nominated	
2003	Lindsay Gravina for Tough Love	Engineer of the Year	Nominated	
2006	Lindsay Gravina and Magic Dirt for Snow White	Producer of the Year	Nominated	

=== National Live Music Awards ===
The National Live Music Awards (NLMAs) are a broad recognition of Australia's diverse live industry, celebrating the success of the Australian live scene. The awards commenced in 2016.

Year	Nominee / work	Award	Result	Ref.
2018	Magic Dirt	Live Legends (Hall of Fame)	inductee	
