= Raúl Sánchez (musician) =

Spanish-born Australian rock musician (born 1973)

Raúl Sánchez i Jorge
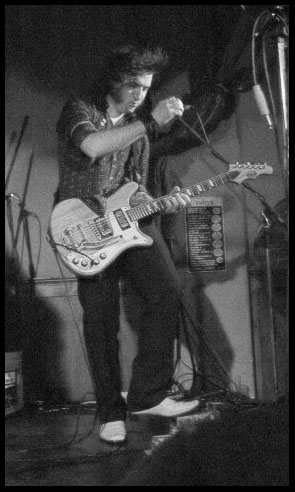

Background information
- Born: Raúl Sánchez i Jorge; 21 March 1973 (age 53); Valencia, Spain
- Instrument: Guitar
- Years active: 1997–present

Raúl Sánchez (born 21 March 1973) is a Spanish-born Australian rock musician, best known as the lead guitarist in Magic Dirt. Raul initially played in Melbourne based band Muffcake before joining Magic Dirt. Raul currently plays in River Of Snakes, and Tex Perkins super group "The Ape".

== Early life ==
Raúl Sánchez i Jorge was born in Valencia, Spain.

== Magic Dirt ==
Sánchez joined Magic Dirt in 1997.
