= Adalita Srsen =

Australian singer (born 1971)

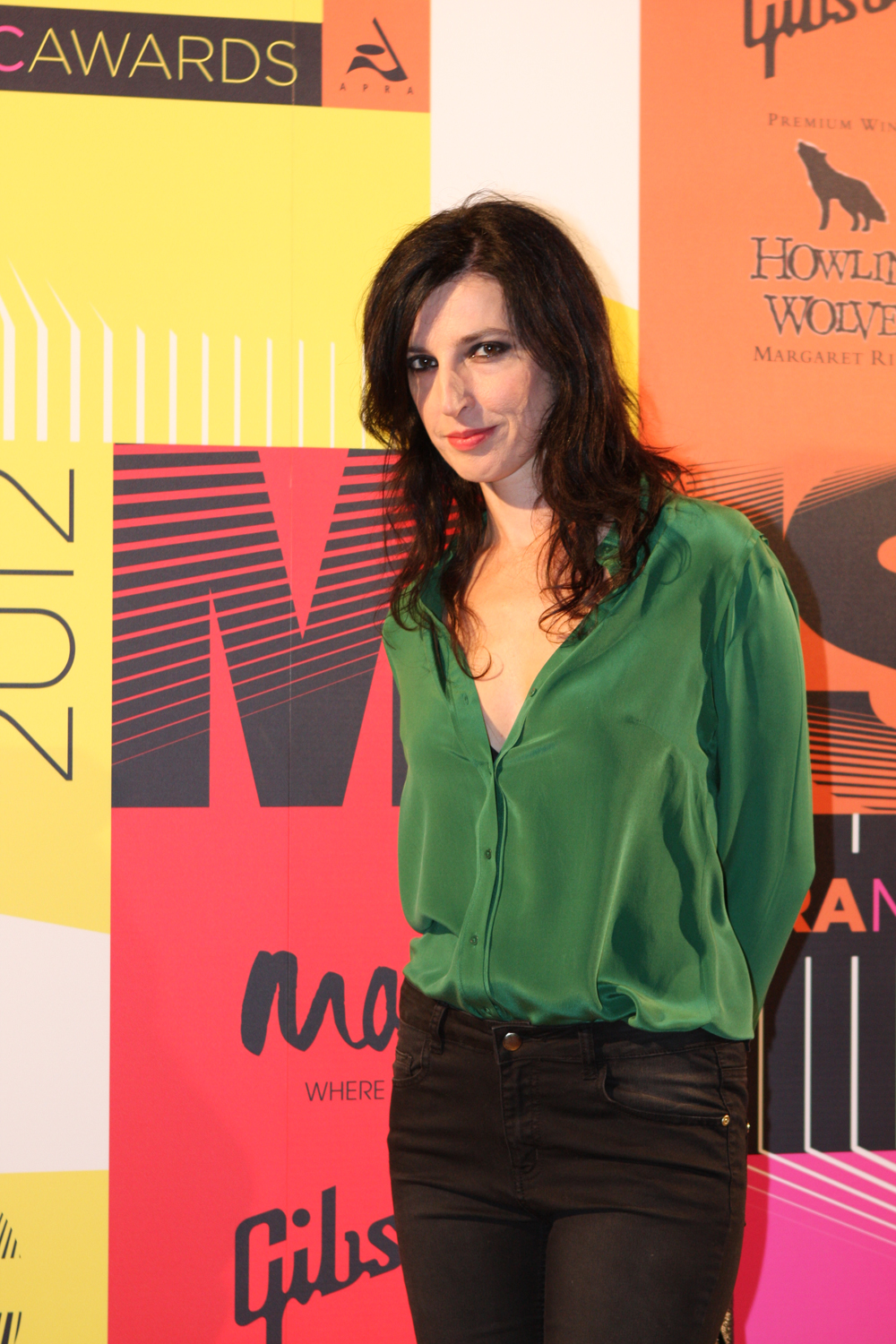
- Adalita at the 2012 APRA Music Awards

Background information
- Born: Adalita Srsen; 25 February 1971 (age 55); Geelong, Victoria, Australia
- Genres: Rock, alternative rock
- Occupations: Songwriter, singer, guitarist
- Instruments: Vocals, guitar
- Years active: 1989–present
- Member of: Magic Dirt, Bleak Squad
- Website: adalita.com

Adalita Srsen (/ˈsɜːrsən/, born 25 February 1971), commonly known mononymously as Adalita, is an Australian rock musician who is a founding member of the rock bands Magic Dirt and Bleak Squad as well as a solo artist. She released her first solo album, Adalita, in 2011 and her second solo album, All Day Venus, in September 2013.

== Early life ==
Adalita was born in Geelong, Victoria, on 25 February 1971.

She told Triple J's Richard Kingsmill in 2000 that she made her first guitar out of cardboard and wool, before she bought her first acoustic guitar. "I learnt a few chord progressions from a "how to" guitar book and then started writing and recording my own compositions, using two tape decks and layering guitar parts and vocal harmonies."

Adalita told Australian Guitar magazine (when she became the first female to appear on the magazine's cover) in 2005 that she "was 18 or 19 when I bought my first A$90 acoustic (guitar) for whatever strange reason I bought it for, on a whim. Then I got an electric maybe six months later and started on that – what was that – in like 1989, 1990."

In the early 1990s, she formed a band, Deer Bubbles, with Dean Turner. While, this band didn't last long, by 1992, Adalita and Turner, as well as guitarist Daniel Herring, had formed The Jim Jims. Adalita and Turner then formed Magic Dirt following the addition of drummer Adam Robertson.

== Solo work ==
=== 2006–2008: "Double Dare" ===
In 2006, Adalita released her first material as a solo performer. She performed on two cover versions for the Mick Harvey-produced soundtrack of the Australian film Suburban Mayhem: "Double Dare" (originally by Hoyt Axton) and "Sex Beat" (Gun Club). along with Harvey, Dean Turner and Rowland S. Howard who also played on the tracks. A promotional video was made for the single "Double Dare", featuring Adalita and Suburban Mayhem star Emily Barclay. At the time, such solo work were side projects and Adalita soon resumed work with Magic Dirt.

=== 2009–2012: Adalita ===
Initially, Adalita had no intention to release her own music as a solo artist, but was encouraged by her Magic Dirt bandmate and mentor, Dean Turner, to undertake the production of her debut album. Production of the solo album commenced in 2009, with Turner responsible for production duties; however, in August 2009, due to a rare form of tissue cancer, Turner died. The album was then completed in 2010 while Magic Dirt was on hiatus following Turner's death.

To coincide with her support slot on the Blondie and Pretenders double-headline Australian tour, Adalita released the Hot Air EP on 26 November 2010. Her eponymous debut album was released on 4 March 2011 through Liberation Music and debuted at No. 23 on the ARIA Album Chart.

=== 2013: All Day Venus ===
On 28 April 2013, Adalita announced on her Facebook fan page that she had started work on her second album at Birdland Studios with long-time producer Lindsay Gravina. She informed her Facebook fans on 24 May 2013 that Jim White from Dirty Three recorded drums for the album over two days.

Adalita appeared on Australian television program RocKwiz in June 2013 and performed a new track, entitled 'I Want Your Love'. In July 2013, she previewed the track "All Day Venus" and announced a small run of Australian east coast shows to preview the new material.

On 8 August 2013, music website mess+noise announced that All Day Venus would be released on 20 September 2013, and revealed the album artwork and track listing. The website also featured a link to the album's first single, 'Warm Like You', which premiered on Triple J the same day. 'Warm Like You' was released on iTunes on 12 August 2013.

In an October 2013 interview, Adalita described the experience of recording the album with Gravina and a new band:

I thought initially I should get a new producer, but in the end there were so many other new things going on—new sound, new band. I figured I needed something more stable. He knows what he can extract from me.

Adalita also explained that the album is about a transformative experience in her life that resulted in a learning process. During the creation process for the album, she was influenced by American academic Joseph Campbell and mythology. She also revealed that she is most comfortable in "bare" aesthetic surroundings and, in relation to the writing period for 'All Day Venus': "I like a lot of space and calm."

The album was voted into the third position in the 2013 readers poll of mess + noise, an Australian music website, in which readers selected their favourite albums of the year.

=== 2022: Inland ===
In September 2022, Adalita released "Dazzling", and announced the release of her third studio album, Inland, scheduled for release in December 2022.

In June 2023, Adalita released a cover of Michael Hutchence's "Rooms for the Memory" as a benefit record for Ollie Olsen.

== Collaborations ==
In addition to the various collaborations that were undertaken with Magic Dirt, Adalita has appeared as a guest vocalist on songs by other Australian bands. In 1992, she appeared on Velvet (Down) Underground, a tribute album for The Velvet Underground, providing vocals to The Clowns Smiling Backwards' rendition of 'The Black Angel's Death Song'.

In 2002, Adalita collaborated with Bodyjar on the 'Too Drunk To Drive' single and also appeared in the song's music video.

In 2003, Adalita appeared on The Calculators' song 'Cellophane' that was included on The Secret Life Of Us 3 soundtrack album. Also in 2003, she was one of many guest vocalists during an edition of Triple J's Live at the Wireless segment, in which You Am I performed 'Jewels And Bullets' and 'Damage'. Also in 2003, Adalita attended the 'Mushroom Music Writers Bloc', a songwriting workshop for Australian artists—she and 78 Saab's Ben Nash penned the track, 'Too Much Is Not Enough'. The track was featured as a b-side on Magic Dirt's "Plastic Loveless Letter".

During the 2006 Big Day Out tour, Adalita appeared on stage with The Beasts Of Bourbon and Magic Dirt supported the band on a 2007 Australian tour. Also in 2006, she appeared in the Australian short film The Desert by Glendyn Ivin.

In 2007, Adalita collaborated with Katalyst (Ashley Anderson) on the track 'Bladewalker', from the band's album What's Happening; the track was released on 25 August 2007. She also joined Katalyst on a national Australian tour in November of that year.

On 24 January 2009, Adalita appeared on an episode of RocKwiz and performed a duet with Gareth Liddiard (The Drones), as the pair covered The Saints' 'Messin' with the Kid'. Adalita also appeared on the 2009 RocKwiz Christmas special, which was broadcast on 19 December 2009, performing a cover of The Pretenders' '2,000 Miles'.

During December 2011, in the period leading up to the Christmas holiday, Adalita embarked on a tour of the east coast of Australia with fellow Australian musician Kevin Mitchell (the pair had also toured together with their bands, Jebediah and Magic Dirt). Entitled "Good Evans it's Xmas" (Mitchell was performing in the guise of Bob Evans), the tour featured the pair performing a rendition of 'Must Be Santa', a song that had also been covered by Bob Dylan in 2009.

In 2013, Adalita recorded bass for fellow Melbourne musicians Dark Fair, as well as performances with the band at live shows. 2013 also saw her reprise as guest on Rockwiz, where she performed a duet (with J Mascis) of 'Stop Draggin' My Heart Around'. Alongside Kevin Mitchell, Adalita was selected by Australia's Double J radio station for the August 2014 "Artist in Residence" role. Adalita and Mitchell presented two Sunday episodes individually throughout August 2014, and co-presented the final episode, 'Unforgettable Opening Lines', on 31 August. Adalita's individual episodes were titled 'Heartache & Pain' and 'The Dark Side'.

== Personal life ==
Adalita is a conservationist, a keen advocate of animal rights and is also a vegan. Adalita adopted a vegetarian diet around the age of 18 explaining, "It was a very easy decision to make and I never went back." During the promotional period of All Day Venus in September 2013, Adalita stated that she is a keen photographer.

== Discography ==
=== Studio albums ===
List of studio albums, with selected chart positions
Title	Details	Peak chart positions
Title	Details	AUS
Adalita	Released: 4 March 2011; Label: Liberation Music (LMCD0116); Formats: CD, digital download	23
All Day Venus	Released: 20 September 2013; Label: Liberation Music (LMCD0233); Formats: CD, LP, digital download	30
Inland	Released: 2 December 2022; Label: Liberation Records (LRCD0035); Formats: CD, LP, digital download, streaming	29

=== Singles ===
List of singles as lead artist and certifications
Title	Year	Album
"Double Dare"	2006	Suburban Mayhem soundtrack
"That's What I Heard" (with Robert Scott)	2010	non-album single
"Hot Air"	2010	Adalita
"The Repairer"	2011	Adalita
"Fool Around"	2011	Adalita
"Warm Like You"	2013	All Day Venus
"Dazzling"	2022	Inland
"Savage Heart"	2022	Inland
"Hit Me"	2022	Inland
"Rooms for the Memory"	2023	non album single

== Awards and nominations ==
=== AIR Awards ===
The Australian Independent Record Awards (commonly known informally as AIR Awards) is an annual awards night to recognise, promote and celebrate the success of Australia's Independent Music sector.

Year	Nominee / work	Award	Result
2011	herself	Best Independent Artist	Nominated
2011	herself	Breakthrough Artist of the Year	Nominated
2011	Adalita	Best Independent Album	Won
2011	"Hot Air"	Best Independent Single/EP	Nominated

=== ARIA Music Awards ===
The ARIA Music Awards is an annual awards ceremony that recognises excellence, innovation, and achievement across all genres of Australian music.

Year	Nominee / work	Award	Result
2011	Adalita	Best Female Artist	Nominated
2014	All Day Venus	Best Female Artist	Nominated

=== Australian Music Prize ===
The Australian Music Prize (the AMP) is an annual award of $30,000 given to an Australian band or solo artist in recognition of the merit of an album released during the year of award.

Year	Nominee / work	Award	Result
2012	Adalita	Australian Music Prize	Nominated

=== Music Victoria Awards ===
The Music Victoria Awards (previously known as The Age EG Awards and The Age Music Victoria Awards) are an annual awards night celebrating Victorian music.

Year	Nominee / work	Award	Result	Ref.
2013	Adalita Srsen	Best Female	Won	
2013	All Day Venus	Best Album	Nominated	
2023	Adalita Srsen	Best Solo Artist	Nominated	

=== National Live Music Awards ===
The National Live Music Awards (NLMAs) are a broad recognition of Australia's diverse live industry, celebrating the success of the Australian live scene. The awards commenced in 2016.

Year	Nominee / work	Award	Result
2017	Adalita	Live Guitarist of the Year	Nominated
