= Lindsay Gravina =

Australian record producer

- Occupation(s): Record producer, audio engineer
- Years active: 1990s–present
- Known for: Producing albums for The Living End, Magic Dirt, Thirsty Merc, Eskimo Joe, Jet, Rowland S. Howard, Kate Miller-Heidke, Cosmic Psychos, British India, Shihad, Society of Beggars; co-producing Mutiny in Heaven: The Birthday Party
- Website: https://www.birdlandstudios.com.au/

Lindsay Gravina is an Australian record producer and audio engineer known for his significant contributions to the Australian rock and post-punk music scenes. As the in-house producer at Melbourne's Birdland Studios, Gravina has collaborated with a diverse array of artists, including The Living End, Magic Dirt, Thirsty Merc, Eskimo Joe, Jet, Rowland S. Howard, Kate Miller-Heidke, Cosmic Psychos, Shihad, British India, and Society of Beggars.

== Career ==
Gravina began gaining recognition in the late 1990s, producing seminal records that helped define the Australian alternative music landscape. His production style is noted for capturing raw energy and authenticity.

Gravina's notable collaborations include:

- The Living End (1998): Produced and engineered the band's self-titled debut album, which reached number one on the ARIA Albums Chart and achieved multi-platinum status.
- Magic Dirt – Tough Love (2003) and Snow White (2005): Produced albums that earned ARIA nominations for Producer and Engineer of the Year.
- Thirsty Merc (2004): Produced their platinum-certified debut album.
- Eskimo Joe – Contributed to the band's early recordings.
- Jet – Recorded two tracks on their debut EP Dirty Sweet (2002) at Birdland Studios.
- Rowland S. Howard – Collaborated with the post-punk icon on various projects.
- Society of Beggars – Produced their EP An EP Called Night (2017) and album Levitator (2024).
- Co-producer of Mutiny in Heaven: The Birthday Party (2023), a documentary exploring the legacy of The Birthday Party.
- Nightflight (2012) – Co-produced the album by Kate Miller-Heidke.
- Self Totalled (1995) and Off Ya Cruet! (2005) – Produced albums for Cosmic Psychos.
- Love Is the New Hate (2005) – Mixed the second studio album by Shihad (tracks 2–10).
- "Outside 109" (2005) – Produced British India’s debut single at Birdland Studios.
- Live 1981–82 (1999) – Mixed the live album by The Birthday Party.

Gravina has also worked with The Galvatrons, Clowns, The ReChords, The Green Mist, and Area-7.

== Selected discography ==
- The Living End – The Living End (1998)
- Area-7 – Single "Bitter Words" (1998)
- The Birthday Party – Live 1981–82 (1999)
- Jet – Dirty Sweet EP (2002)
- Magic Dirt – Tough Love (2003)
- Magic Dirt – Snow White (2005)
- Thirsty Merc – Thirsty Merc (2004)
- Cosmic Psychos – Self Totalled (1995), Off Ya Cruet! (2005)
- Shihad – Love Is the New Hate (2005)
- British India – "Outside 109" single (2005)
- The Galvatrons – When We Were Kids EP (2008)
- Clowns – Debut album (2013)
- The ReChords – It Won't Be Long EP (2013)
- Kate Miller-Heidke – Nightflight (2012)
- Rowland S. Howard – Various recordings
- Society of Beggars – An EP Called Night (2017), Levitator (2024)
- The Green Mist – Next Stop Antarctica (2007)

== Awards and recognition ==
- ARIA Engineer of the Year nomination for Tough Love (2003)
- ARIA Producer of the Year nomination for Snow White (2005)
