= Dean Turner (musician) =

Australian musician and record producer

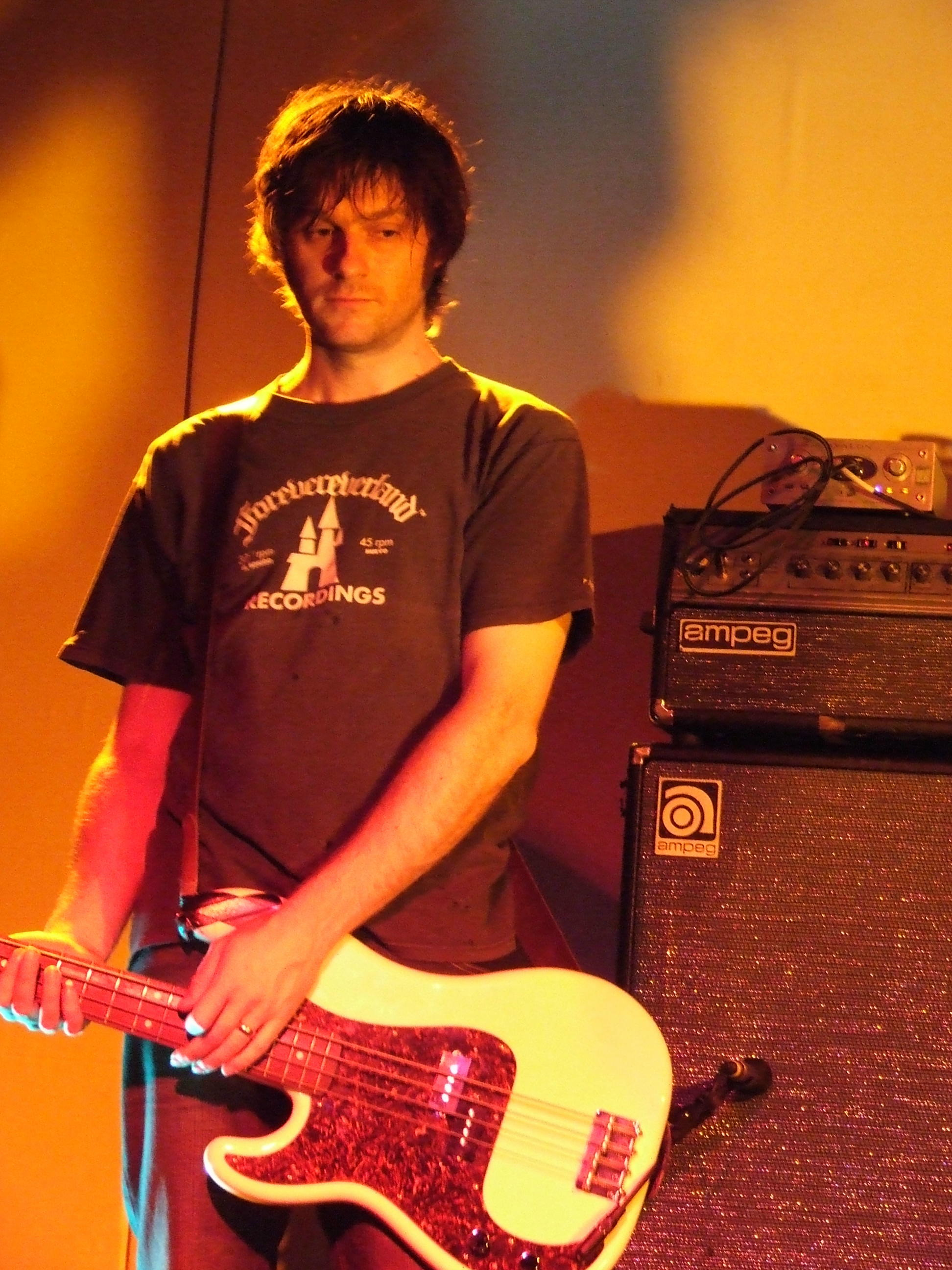

Background information
- Born: 6 January 1972; Geelong, Victoria, Australia
- Died: 21 August 2009 (aged 37) Melbourne, Victoria, Australia
- Instruments: Bass, vocals
- Years active: 1989–2009
- Formerly of: Magic Dirt

Dean Turner (6 January 1972 – 21 August 2009) was an Australian rock musician and record producer. He was best known as a founding member and bass player of Australian rock band Magic Dirt.

== Career ==
Turner began playing the bass guitar in 1989 and in 1990 he formed Deer Bubbles with Adalita Srsen. In 1991 the pair, along with guitarist Daniel Herring, started a new band, briefly known as The Jim Jims. With the addition of drummer Adam Robertson, they became known as "Magic Dirt".

Under the name Dean Dirt, Turner also produced recordings for a number of Australian bands, including two albums for theredsunband plus releases for Gersey and Sons Of The Sun. In the period up until his death, he was acting as the manager for Brisbane band Violent Soho.

== Personal life ==
Growing up in Geelong, Breamlea and Torquay with his parents, two brothers and two sisters. In the early 1980s Dean was racing BMX bikes, as well as riding dirt bikes. In the mid-1980s Dean turned to skateboarding and became quite popular at an indoor skatepark in Geelong. Turner subsequently married Linda Bosidis and in 2004 became a father. The birth of his daughter Charlie was followed by the birth of his second daughter Evie.

== Illness ==
After Turner died, the band released a statement that partially detailed the circumstances of his condition:

...For nine years, Dean battled an extremely rare form of soft tissue cancer called dermatofibrosarcoma protuberans or (DFSP)... This cancer became life threatening after it began to metastasize and cause various fatal tumours ... Being a very private man, Dean chose to fight the cancer in a quiet and dignified manner ... [H]e displayed great courage and incredible stoicism ... [And] above all else he had an unshakeable positive attitude throughout his long ordeal ... [H]is composure and grace during this time will never be forgotten and is an inspiration to us all ...

Although Turner had been ill for some time, it was only in 2008 that the band began using a substitute bass player on tour. Turner is survived by two daughters.

== Legacy ==
In September 2011, the organisers of the Laneway Festival, in collaboration with Turner's wife Bosidis and their two daughters, announced the launch of the "Dean Turner" stage at the Melbourne leg of the 2012 round of the annual event. The press release of the "ongoing collaboration" stated:

As bass player and co-founder of Magic Dirt, Dean was deeply devoted to and passionate about music which was always evident in his energetic and enthusiastic stage presence. He was a unique individual with a beautiful soul and is a huge inspiration to many musicians. He provided his vast knowledge and support with humility, grace and integrity throughout his role as a songwriter, musician and producer. Dean worked tirelessly because music was one of the greatest joys in his life; he selflessly championed Australian music, was focused on encouraging young bands and hosted music workshops for secondary schools nationally. He was particularly generous with his time and advice and had a profound effect on people, always leaving a warm and inspired feeling.

At the 2013 Laneway Festival, the "Dean Turner Project" was launched as an expansion of the collaboration and was also featured at the 2014 event. The addition to the collaboration includes financial support for the "Yiriman Project", an organisation that supports young indigenous people in the south-west Kimberley region of Western Australia, where suicide rates have been high.
