= Joe McKee (musician) =

- Born: 3 December 1984 (age 40) London, England
- Genres: Folk, Experimental, Psychedelic
- Occupation: Musician/Composer
- Instrument(s): Vocals, guitar, keys
- Years active: 2003–present
- Labels: Dot Dash Recordings
- Website: http://joemckeemusic.tumblr.com/

Joe McKee is a London-born composer and sound artist. He was raised in the Darling Ranges of Western Australia from the age of five.

== Background ==
McKee was born in London on 3 December 1984. He moved to Darling Ranges, Western Australia with his family at the age of five. In 2003, he became a founding member of Snowman.

After Snowman dissolved, McKee began composing under his own name for film, TV and his solo project. His debut album, Burning Boy, was released through Dot Dash Recordings in Australia in 2012, and through Big Ship in the UK and Europe in 2013. Since then McKee has contributed sound art installations to various group exhibitions including the L.A. based MAMA gallery inaugural exhibition.

== Discography ==
=== Albums ===
With Snowman

- Snowman (Dot Dash, 2006)
- The Horse, The Rat and The Swan (Dot dash, 2008)
- Absence (2011)

Solo

- Burning Boy (Dot Dash/Remote Control, 2012)
- An Australian Alien (Babyrace, 2018)
