= Winter McQuinn =

Australian musician

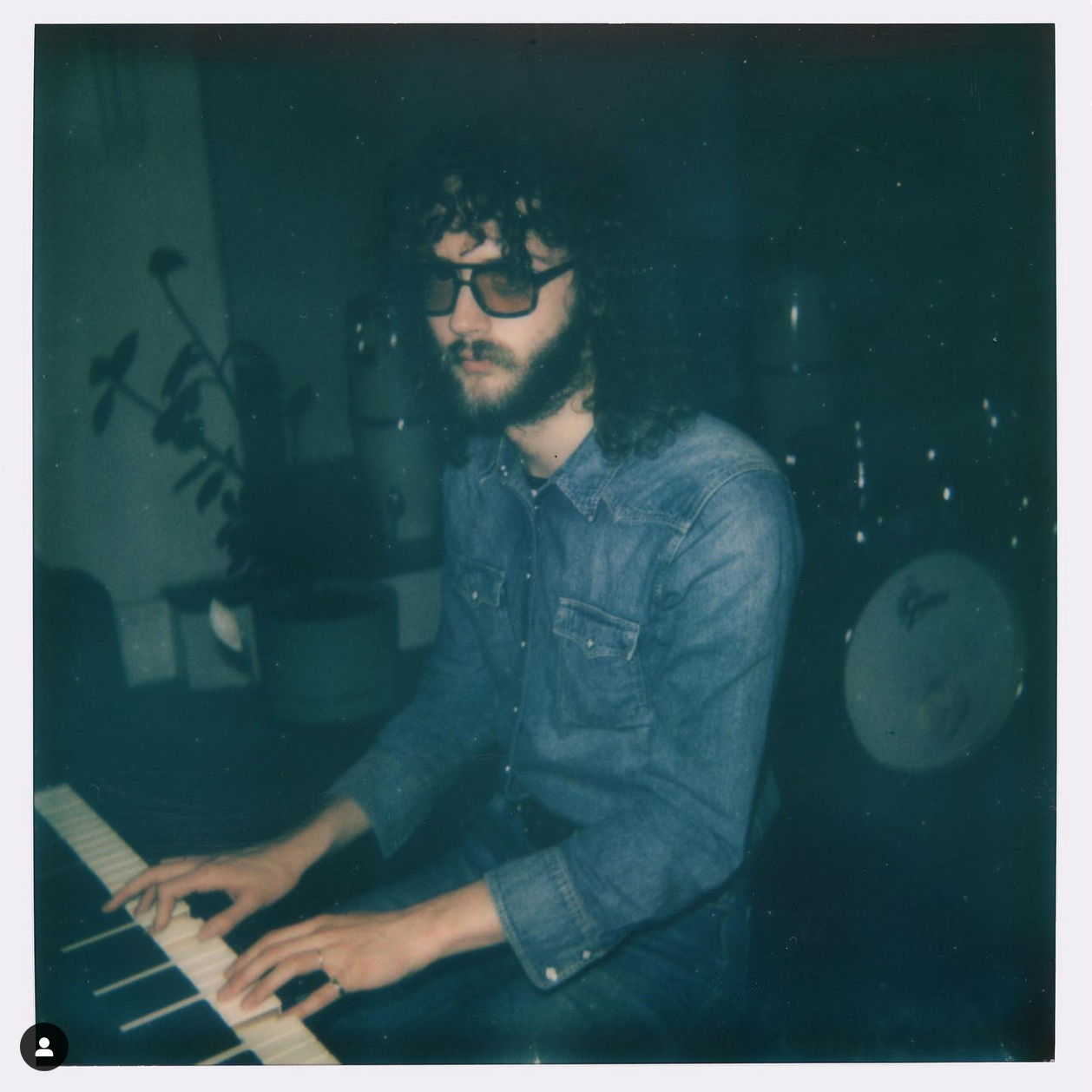

Winter McQuinn is an Australian musician, songwriter, and environmentalist. His work fuses folk, rock and psych-pop, intertwining vintage tones with contemporary lyrical content. Shindig! Magazine (UK) describes his music as "psychedelic pop with a 21st Century environmentalist twist."

He is the founding member of Sunfruits, who released their debut album One Degree in 2023 following this with UK/EU tours in 2023 and 2024.

Winter's solo work began with his debut album release A Rabble of Bees in 2021 His highly acclaimed 2024 album Move to the Trees was included in Rolling Stone Australia's Top 50 Albums of 2024 and KEXP FM Roadhouse Show Top 10 Albums of the Year.

In November 2024, he released Recently I've been missing the Colour Green, a collaborative EP with Acacia Pip of PINCH POINTS. Winter and Acacia are touring the UK/EU in support of this album in 2025. Winter is currently the drummer with Jade Imagine on the Australian label Remote Control Records and Leah Senior and Jesse Williams band Girlatones and his work is released by Australian independent record label Third Eye Stimuli Records.

In April 2025, Winter released the single Hand in Hand with Moby Beefheart of FUR under the new project, Beefheart and McQuinn.

In June 2025, Winter signed with US label, Born Losers Records. In May 2026, following the release of Beefheart and McQuinn's debut album, Midtown Downtime, Beefheart and McQuinn signed with We are Busy Bodies Record label Canada and Crossover Touring US.

Winter and Acacia created the Green Your Noise carbon calculator and resource for musicians.

== Discography ==
Title	Details
A Rabble of Bees (LP)	Released: 30 April 2021; Label: Third Eye Stimuli Records; Format: LP, digital download
Move to the Trees (LP)	Released: 5 April, 2024; Label: Third Eye Stimuli Records (AUS) and Echodelic Records (US); Format: LP, digital download
Recently I've been missing the Colour Green (EP)	Released: 15 November 2024; Label: Third Eye Stimuli Records; Format: Cassette, digital download; Collaboration with Acacia Pip
Hand in Hand (Single)	Released: 16 April 2025; Label: Third Eye Stimuli Records; Format: digital download; Collaboration with Moby Beefheart of FUR
Where are we now? (LP)	Released 19 September 2025; Label: Third Eye Stimuli Records and Born Losers Records; Format: LP, digital download
Midtown Downtime (LP)	Released May 8 2026; Label: Rainflower and We are Busy Bodies; Format LP, digital download; Beefheart and McQuinn collaboration
Disasociating on the Travelator ( EP)	Released 16 October 2026; Label: Third Eye Stimuli Records; Format: LP, digital download; Collaboration with Acacia Pip

With Sunfruits

Title	Details
One Degree (LP)	Released April 28, 2023; Format LP, digital; Label Third Eye Stimuli Records (AUS) Earth Libraries (US)
Certified Organic (EP)	Released February 11, 2020; Format LP, digital; Label Third Eye Stimuli Records (AUS)

== Awards and nominations ==
Winter's song "End of the World" written with his band Sunfruits was a finalist in the Environmental Music Prize.in 2023. Winter was a finalist in the UpStart Award (Australian music) 2024. In 2025, Winter was the winner of the Upstart Award ( Australian Music).
