= Beefheart & McQuinn =

British-Australian musical duo

Beefheart & McQuinn are a British-Australian musical duo consisting of British singer-songwriter William Murray, who performs under the name Moby Beefheart, and Australian musician Winter McQuinn. Based in Melbourne, Australia, the duo perform contemporary psychedelic folk and soft rock, combining acoustic guitar arrangements, vocal harmonies and elements of 1960s and 1970s folk rock.

Their debut single, "Hand in Hand", was released in April 2025 through Third Eye Stimuli Records. Their debut studio album, Midtown Downtime, was released in 2026 with Rainflower and We are Busy Bodies.

== History ==
=== Formation ===
Beefheart & McQuinn formed following a chance meeting between Murray and McQuinn at a coffee shop. Murray, a British musician associated with the Brighton-based indie rock band FUR had relocated to Australia, where he met McQuinn, a Melbourne musician associated with the bands Sunfruits and Jade Imagine.

The duo released their debut single, "Hand in Hand", on 16 April 2025 through Third Eye Stimuli Records.

The release received coverage from independent music publication Hard of Hearing Magazine, which described the track as psychedelic folk with stylistic influences from 1960s music.

=== 2026: Midtown Downtime ===
In 2026, Beefheart & McQuinn released their debut studio album, Midtown Downtime. The ten-track record was released digitally through Norwegian based label Rainflower on 8 May 2026 and subsequently received a vinyl release through Canadian independent label We Are Busy Bodies.

The album explores themes including work, time, productivity, isolation, relationships and nostalgia. Its arrangements combine soft rock and psychedelic folk, featuring layered vocal harmonies, acoustic guitars, syncopated rhythms and occasional keyboard and percussion elements.

Add to Wantlist described the record as a collection of soft-focus indie folk songs, highlighting its vocal harmonies, acoustic textures and understated arrangements.

In Backseat Mafia reviewer John Parry discussed its combination of melodic songwriting and lyrical reflections on contemporary life, identifying contrasts between its relaxed musical arrangements and more serious subject matter.

In October 2026, the duo appeared in Aquarium Drunkard's Lagniappe Sessions series, contributing cover versions of songs by Danny O'Keefe, Mark Fry and Heron.

== Musical style ==
Beefheart & McQuinn's music has been characterised as contemporary psychedelic folk and soft rock. Their sound incorporates elements of folk rock, country rock and 1970s singer-songwriter music, with an emphasis on vocal harmonies and melodic guitar arrangements.

Their influences include the folk-rock traditions of the 1960s and 1970s. Add to Wantlist noted similarities to the softer psychedelic music of that period, while Backseat Mafia highlighted the duo's melodic approach and use of acoustic instrumentation.

The lyrics of Midtown Downtime address themes of modern working life, economic pressures, personal relationships, nostalgia and isolation.

== Members ==
- William Murray (Moby Beefheart) – vocals, guitar, songwriting and production
- Winter McQuinn – vocals, guitar, songwriting and production

== Discography ==
=== Studio albums ===
Year	Title	Record label
2026	Midtown Downtime	Rainflower Records / We Are Busy Bodies

=== Singles ===
Year	Title	Record label
2025	"Hand in Hand"	Third Eye Stimuli Records
2026	"Do It Again"	Rainflower Records
2026	"Yesterdays & Younger Days"	Rainflower Records
