= UpStart Award =

The UpStart Award is an annual Australian award for singer-songwriters based in Victoria, Australia. The award is funded by a music loving family in Melbourne, and the winners are decided by a panel of local music experts including Angie McMahon. The Upstart Award was founded in 2017 with the intention of supporting and furthering Victorian based singer songwriters careers.

== Awards by year ==
Year	Finalists	Winner
2017	Alex Gilbert Dominic Kearton Gena Rose Bruce Jade Imagine James Ellis James Maloney Miss Eileen and King Lear Susie Scurry (The Grand Magoozi) Alex Lashlie Rhea Caldwell	Jade Imagine
2018	Joshua Blashki Ryan Basile Gena Rose Bruce Rhea Caldwell Ryan Downey Wesley Fuller Oscar Lush Bella Quinlan Jemma Rowlands Susie Scurry	Ryan Downey
2019	Gena Rose Bruce Fenn Wilson Phil Peers (Dumb Whales) Georgia Delves (Georgia State Line) Katie Bates Jack Robbins Holly Alexander (Signal Chain) Tamara Reichman Luke Jonothan (Voltaire) Patrick Ryan	Gena Rose Bruce
2020	Maple Glider Keiran Daly Chitra Ridwan Sol Hopkins James Ellis Georgia Delves Sam Flood Zoe Fox ORCHA Hannah Cameron	Chitra Ridwan
2021	Georgia Delves (Georgia State Line) Arnt Mae Mr Alford Emma Volard Al Matcott Immi Owusu Holly Alexander Tyler Millot Sophia Lubczenko The Florets	Georgia Delves (Georgia State Line)
2022	Charlie Needs Braces Nicholas Imfeld Charlotte Le Lievre Prudns Patrick Wilson Romanie Assez Rhys Renwick Olivia Bolmat (Norwood) Louis Valentine Charlie Needs Braces David M Western	Charlie Needs Braces
2023	Patrick Wilson Katie Bates Cheap Skate Jocelyn Wynter Mac Mittens Tim Wilson Loretta Miller Phil Peers Romanie Assez Maeve Grieve	Romanie Assez
2024	Mika James Liam Wright Ruby Jones Hana Brenecki The Counterfeit Ville Queenie Tejo D’Cruz Harriet Wraith Winter McQuinn	Queenie
2025	Karlo Acinue The Smith and Western Jury Winter McQuinn Elly McKinnon Oluwatobi Akanbi Hannah Kate The Darling Family Trust Emily McGill/Milou Moon Charlie Swansson Bad Bangs	Winter McQuinn
