= Crossover Touring =

American independent music booking agency

Crossover Touring is an American independent music booking agency specialising in the representation and touring of artists across multiple musical genres.

Founded in 2013 by Patrick May and Barron Ruth, the company is based in the United States and represents artists working across genres including Americana, bluegrass, folk, rock, soul and roots music.

== History ==
Crossover Touring was established in 2013 by music agents Patrick May and Barron Ruth in Atlanta, Georgia. The agency was founded to represent artists whose music and live performances appeal to audiences beyond traditional genre boundaries. In January 2018, Crossover Touring expanded through a merger with the Prater Day Agency, founded by Virginia Prater. The merger brought more than six agents and a roster of over 40 artists to the agency. Prater joined Crossover Touring as vice president. In March 2026, the agency announced the opening of a Chicago office and the addition of booking agent Harry Woosley, formerly of Madison House. The expansion accompanied an increase in international booking activity, including tours across Europe, Latin America, Asia, Australia and New Zealand.

== Artists and representation ==
Crossover Touring represents artists working across Americana, bluegrass, folk, roots music and other genres. Its roster has included performers such as Billy Strings, Watchhouse, Bronwyn Keith Hynes, Thee Sacred Souls, The Devil Makes Three, The Womack Sisters, The Tallest Man on Earth, Victor Wooten, Sam Bush, Yonder Mountain String Band, Gwenifer Raymond and Beefheart & Mcquinn. The agency provides artist booking and representation services, coordinating live performances, concerts, festival appearances and international touring opportunities.
