= Over the Stones, Under the Stars =

Studio album by Ned Collette & Wirewalker
- Released: 23 October 2009
- Genre: Folk rock
- Length: 54:21
- Label: Dot Dash Recordings
- Producer: Ned Collette, Joe Talia

Ned Collette & Wirewalker chronology
Over the Stones, Under the Stars (2009)	2 (2012)

Over the Stones, Under the Stars is the debut album by Australian folk-rock band Ned Collette & Wirewalker, released in 2009.

Mess+Noise magazine described the album as "astonishingly brilliant" in its denunciation of modern life and said: "This is music as foreboding weather, all downcast greys and apocalyptic reds, thick and blustery and beautiful." The magazine said: "Wirewalker (drummer Joe Talia and bass player Ben Bourke) brings a new spaciousness and extravagance required for the task, while Collette’s vocals have evolved from his hushed confessional roots into a more poised and commanding presence."

The Vine Music website highlighted the dense, convoluted lyrical content and that "the piling of details can sometimes find us bemused by his prolixity, our narrator veering from observation to observation, along a dark path we cannot always follow". Its review noted Collette's "weary worldview" and said the album was "a record of searching discontent, but one that finds plenty of space for careful arrangements. Keyboards and synths blossom and bloom across the songs here, finding their way up through the crevices the trio leave in their playing. Collette's wiry voice is prominent and pushed to do new things, increasingly aided—and with subtlety—by bassist Bourke".

== Track listing ==
(all songs by Ned Collette & Wirewalker)

1. "The Idealist" — 3:59
2. "All The Signs — 6:25
3. "Your Golden Heart" — 5:40
4. "Come Clean" — 5:10
5. "Mr Day" — 4:44
6. "Aspect" — 6:29
7. "Why We Can Be Apart" — 4:58
8. "Polly Angel" — 5:19
9. "I Had A Love" — 5:34
10. "One Evening, In The Middle Of The Road ..." — 5:56

== Personnel ==
- Ned Collette — vocals, guitar, organ, piano, mellotron
- Ben Bourke — bass, harmonies
- Joe Talia — drums, percussion, harmonies
