= Young and Restless =

Young and Restless may refer to:

- The Young and the Restless, an American television soap opera running since 1973
- Young and Restless (hip-hop band), a hip-hop duo famous in the early 1990s
- Young and Restless (Australian band), a band from Canberra, Australia formed in 2005
  - Young and Restless (Young and Restless album), 2007
- Young & Restless (Kristinia DeBarge album), 2013
- Young and Restless (Prism album), 1980

== See also ==
- Young & Reckless (disambiguation)
