= Networking in Purgatory =

Studio album by Ned Collette & Wirewalker
- Released: 18 April 2014 (digital); 22 August 2014 (CD)
- Recorded: Melbourne, Berlin, 2012-2013
- Genre: Folk rock
- Length: 40:24
- Label: Dot Dash Recordings, Bronze Rat
- Producer: Ned Collette, Joe Talia

Ned Collette & Wirewalker chronology
2 (2012)	Networking in Purgatory (2014)

Professional ratings
Review scores
Source	Rating
Rolling Stone	4/5 stars
Sunday Herald Sun	3/5 stars

Networking in Purgatory is the third album by Australian folk-rock band Ned Collette & Wirewalker, released in 2014.

Writing in The Quietus, reviewer Kate Hennessy praised the album as "very good, even exceptional". She described Collette's voice as "sibilant, astringent and at times vaguely waspish ... a voice that alchemises its flaws into powerful strengths, sitting neither above nor below the mix but slicing through it in both directions, reminiscent of the Brians (Eno and Ferry) and the Davids (Byrne and Bowie)". She noted of its lyrics that Collette's "bitterness runs cold and constant even beneath songs that, sonically, express a kind of genial largesse, a contradiction that is this record's most brilliant aspect". The Sydney Morning Herald described it as "a warm, lush record bursting (quietly) with a clutch of songs that dip and dive like springtime swallows, as intricate as they are robust ... It's a considered album, one for headphones with time on one's hands, and it rewards handsomely."

== Track listing ==
(all songs by Ned Collette & Wirewalker)

1. "At the Piano" — 4:33
2. "Networking in Purgatory" — 0:46
3. "Bird" — 4:06
4. "Falls" — 3:35
5. "Vanitas Quack" — 4:32
6. "Opiate Eyes" — 2:26
7. "Across the Frozen Bridge" — 6:17
8. "Echoes Toes" — 4:35
9. "Helios" — 2:31
10. "A Lawyer or a Gimmick" — 4:00
11. "Meltemi " — 2:43

== Personnel ==
- Ned Collette — voice, guitars, bass, synths, mellotron, drum machine, percussion
- Joe Talia — drums, percussion, synths, revox
- James Rushford — backing vocals, viola, synths, ocarina, piano ("At the Piano", "Across the Frozen Bridge")
- Ben Bourke — bassoon, bass ("At the Piano", "Across the Frozen Bridge")
- Erkki Veltheim — violin ("Opiate Eyes")
