= Young & Reckless (disambiguation) =

Young & Reckless is an album by Dirty Penny.

Young & Reckless or Young and Reckless may also refer to:

== Music ==
=== Albums ===
- Young & Reckless, EP by Jon Langston
- Young & Reckless, originally titled Peace and Love, album by Eric Donaldson
- Young & Reckless, album by Blac Youngsta of the Cocaine Muzik Group

=== Singles ===
- "Young & Reckless", song by Chief Keef feat. Lil Durk
- "Young & Reckless", song by Joe Jonas, unreleased
- "Young & Reckless", song by Jaden Smith from the album CTV2
- "Young & Reckless", song by Jon Langston from the EP of the same name
- "Young & Reckless", song by Sak Noel feat. Da Beat Freakz
- "Young & Reckless", song by Discipline from the dual album Working Class Heroes by Agnostic Front and Discipline.
- "Young n' Reckless", song by Krept and Konan from the album Young Kingz

== Other uses ==
- Young & Reckless, a clothing brand founded by Chris Pfaff

== The Young and the Reckless ==
The Young and the Reckless may refer to:

- "The Young and the Reckless", episode of Mad Love
- "The Young and the Reckless", episode of Storage Wars
- "The Young and the Reckless", episode of Cops
- "The Young and the Reckless", episode of Kuu Kuu Harajuku
- "The Young and the Reckless", episode of Most Daring

== See also ==
- Vanguard of the Young & Reckless, album by The Stanfields
- Young and Restless (disambiguation)
