= Oh Inhuman Spectacle =

Studio album by Methyl Ethel
- Released: 5 June 2015
- Label: Dot Dash/4AD

Methyl Ethel chronology
Teeth (2013)	Oh Inhuman Spectacle (2015)	Everything Is Forgotten (2017)

Singles from Oh Inhuman Spectacle
- 1. "Rogues" Released: 2015; 2. "Twilight Driving" Released: 2015; 3. "Idée Fixe" Released: March 2016

Oh Inhuman Spectacle is the debut studio album by Australian band Methyl Ethel. It was released in June 2015 through Dot Dash/4AD.

== Reception ==
Professional ratings
Aggregate scores
Source	Rating
Metacritic	65/100
Review scores
Source	Rating
The Guardian	3/5 stars
Consequence of Sound	B-
Drowned in Sound	7/10

In a review by Stuart Berman from Pitchfork, Berman said "Methyl Ethel makes dream-pop for insomniacs—shadowy, nocturnal music whose surface shimmer barely conceals the fidgety, restless soul lurking underneath."

Bekki Bemrose from Drowned in Sound said "The first few tracks on Oh Inhuman Spectacle set a high bar not quite maintained throughout, but still, the record is a promising début and a perfect soundtrack for those mysterious twilight hours."

Harriet Gibsone from The Guardian said "Its opening handful of tracks are robust – the doomish disco of 'Idée Fixe', the crepuscular melancholy of 'Shadowboxing', the Johnny Marr guitars that inhabit 'Rogues' – but soon the record wears out. Although it assimilates the past decade of alt-pop, there's a wiry quality to Webb's voice which recalls Turin Brakes' 'Olly Knights'. Much of the music here is less unearthly obscurity and more relatively straightforward indie, dressed up in a rainbow poncho."

== Track listing ==
All tracks are written by Jake Webb.

No.	Title	Length
1.	"Idée Fixe"	3:37
2.	"Shadowboxing"	4:10
3.	"Rogues"	3:45
4.	"To Swim"	2:16
5.	"Twilight Driving"	3:59
6.	"Depth Perception"	3:58
7.	"Unbalacing Acts"	4:01
8.	"Also Gesellschaft"	3:03
9.	"Obscura"	3:18
10.	"Artificial Limb"	3:13
11.	"Sweet Waste"	3:59
12.	"Everything Is As It Should Be"	4:30

== Release history ==
Region	Date	Format	Label	Catalogue
Australia	June 2015	CD; digital download; LP; streaming	Dot Dash Recordings	DASH031 /DASH031CD
Worldwide	June 2015	CD; digital download; LP; streaming	4AD	CAD3641 / CAD3641CD
