= 10 Lives (disambiguation) =

10 Lives is a 2024 animated comedy film.

10 Lives or Ten Lives may also refer to:

- Ten Lives, a 2008 album by Gwyneth Herbert
- 10 Lives, a 2018 album by American rock band Saliva (band)
- Ten Lives, a 2006 album by Australian rock band Deloris
