= 2 (Ned Collette album) =

Studio album by Ned Collette & Wirewalker
- Released: 11 May 2012 (Aus/NZ); 6 August 2012 (Worldwide)
- Genre: Folk rock, Art rock
- Length: 39:18
- Label: Fire Records; Dot Dash Recordings
- Producer: Joe Talia, Ned Collette

Ned Collette & Wirewalker chronology
Over the Stones, Under the Stars (2009)	2 (2012)	Networking in Purgatory (2014)

Professional ratings
Review scores
Source	Rating
Allmusic	4/5 stars
Time Out London	4/5 stars
Sydney Morning Herald	4/5 stars
Sunday Herald Sun	3.5/5 stars
Artrocker	5/5 stars

2 is the second album by Australian folk-rock band Ned Collette & Wirewalker, released in 2012.

The title is a reference to the album being the second released under that band name, but also reflects the fact that the album is essentially a collaboration between Collette and longtime collaborator Joe Talia, with regular Wirewalker member Ben Bourke taking time off to be with his young family in Melbourne. Parts of the album were recorded with the two artists working separately—Collette in Berlin and Talia in Melbourne—although Talia spent six weeks in Berlin in mid-2011 to expand the recordings before Collette returned to Melbourne for final mixing. It features guest vocals by Gemma Ray and Laura Jean, among others. The album also features "For Roberto", an instrumental tribute to late Chilean writer Roberto Bolaño.

== Track listing ==
All tracks by Ned Collette, music by Ned Collette & Wirewalker

1. "Il Futuro Fantastico" – 5:39
2. "Stampy" – 4:16
3. "The Hedonist" – 4:16
4. "How to Change a City" – 5:55
5. "The Decision" – 4:54
6. "Long You Lie" – 5:00
7. "Happy Heart" – 1:47
8. "For Roberto" – 3:24
9. "What Lights Have You Seen?" – 4:13

== Personnel ==
- Ned Collette – voice, guitar, bass, synths, drums, drum machine
- Joe Talia – drums, drum machine, synths, revox
- Byron Scullin – saxophone ("Il Futuro Fantastico")
- Gemma Ray – vocals ("The Decision")
- Mirjam Smejkal – vocals ("The Hedonist")
- Laura Jean – vocals ("How to Change a City")
- Biddy Connor – vocals ("How to Change a City")
- Sascha Gersak – vocals ("Long You Lie")
