= Everything Is Forgotten =

Studio album by Methyl Ethel
- Released: 3 March 2017
- Genre: Indie rock, dream pop
- Length: 41:17
- Label: 4AD
- Producer: James Ford, Jake Webb

Methyl Ethel chronology
Oh Inhuman Spectacle (2016)	Everything Is Forgotten (2017)	Triage (2019)

Singles from Everything Is Forgotten
- 1. "No. 28" Released: November 2016; 2. "Ubu" Released: 23 January 2017; 3. "L'Heure des Sorcières" Released: February 2017

Everything Is Forgotten is the second studio album by Australian art rock band Methyl Ethel, released in March 2017. The album peaked at number 16 on the ARIA Charts.

At the J Awards of 2017, the album was nominated for Australian Album of the Year.

At the 2017 West Australian Music Industry Awards, the album won Best Album.

It included the track "Ubu" which was voted into fourth place in the Triple J Hottest 100, 2017.

== Reception ==
Professional ratings
Aggregate scores
Source	Rating
Metacritic	56/100
Review scores
Source	Rating
AllMusic	3/5 stars
DIY	4/5 stars
NME	3/5 stars
PopMatters	5/10
Q	3/5 stars

Emily Mackay from NME said "Everything Is Forgotten is at its best when it pairs... darkly danceable purpose with Ethel's strongest suit – their spookiness" and completed tracks such as "L’Heure Des Sorcières".

NME ranked the album as the 28th best album of 2017.

== Track listing ==
All tracks are written by Jake Webb except where noted

No.	Title	Writer(s)	Length
1.	"Drink Wine"	Thom Stewart, Webb	4:30
2.	"Ubu"		5:02
3.	"No. 28"		4:02
4.	"Femme Maison/One Man House"		4:03
5.	"L'Heure des Sorcières"		3:42
6.	"Act of Contrition"		3:14
7.	"Groundswell"		3:31
8.	"Hyakki Yakō"		3:44
9.	"Summer Moon"		2:10
10.	"Weeds Through the Rind"		3:08
11.	"Schlager"		4:11
Total length:			41:17

== Personnel ==
- Jake Webb – instrumentation, producer, vocals, recording
- Thom Stewart – organ
- James Ford – drums, engineer, mixing, producer, synthesizer
- Noël Besson – vocals
- Holly Fewson – cover painting
- Phil Laslett – design

== Charts ==
Chart (2017)	Peak position
Australian Albums (ARIA)	16

== Release history ==
Region	Date	Format	Label	Catalogue
Australia	3 March 2017	CD; digital download; LP; streaming	Dot Dash Recordings	DASH044CD /DASH044LP
Worldwide	3 March 2017	CD; digital download; LP; streaming	4AD	CAD3701CD / CAD3701LP
