= Jade Imagine =

Australian indie pop band

Jade Imagine is an Australian indie pop band formed in Melbourne in 2016. The group is led by singer-songwriter Jade McInally, who previously performed with acts such as Teeth & Tongue and Tantrums.

== History ==
Jade Imagine released their debut EP, What the Fuck Was I Thinking, in 2017 through Milk! Records, a label co-founded by Australian singer-songwriters Courtney Barnett and Jen Cloher. In 2018, Jade Imagine played at key music festivals, Big Sound Australia, and South by South West, Austin, Texas.

In 2019, Jade Imagine released their first full-length album, Basic Love, through Milk! Records and Marathon Artists. Also in 2019 they supported Pond on their UK tour

The band's sophomore album, Cold Memory, was released in 2022. This record continued their exploration of contemporary themes, receiving positive reviews for its cohesive sound and lyrical depth. In 2024, Jade Imagine supported Stella Donnelly on her national tour.

On February 12, 2025, the band released the single Hot Bath with Rolling Stone listing it as Songs you need to Know. and with strong Australian radio support including rotation on Double J and 3RRR. On March 12, 2025 the band released a remix by GUM & Ginoli of Hot Bath.

== Members ==
- Jade McInally – vocals, guitar
- Tim Harvey – guitar, vocals
- Madeline Lo Booth– bass, vocals
- Winter McQuinn – drums

== Discography ==
- What the Fuck Was I Thinking (EP, 2017)
- Basic Love (Album, 2019)
- Cold Memory (Album, 2022)
- Hot Bath (single 2025)

== Awards and nominations ==
Jade Imagine was the inaugural winner of the Australian music Upstart Award in 2017. and a final nominee in the Australian Music Prize 2019.
