= Sea Priest =

Studio album by Fire! Santa Rosa, Fire!
- Released: 2010
- Recorded: 2008–2010
- Genre: Rock, folk, indie
- Length: 44:40
- Label: Dot Dash
- Producer: Matt Hills, Fire! Santa Rosa, Fire!

Professional ratings
Review scores
Source	Rating
Rave Magazine	3.5/5 stars
The Brag (Street Press)	4/5 stars
Music Australia Guide	4/5 stars
Mess and Noise	not rated

Sea Priest is the only studio album by Adelaide based band Fire! Santa Rosa, Fire!, released in 2010 on Dot Dash.

== Track listing ==
No.	Title	Length
1.	"Ghostress"	3:26
2.	"War Coward"	3:14
3.	"Animal Spirit Guide"	3:09
4.	"Test Crowd"	4:00
5.	"Little Cowboys, Bad Hombres"	3:34
6.	"All of Us in the Water"	2:10
7.	"Onionknight"	2:59
8.	"An Rabbit"	3:14
9.	"Cold Star"	5:27
10.	"Dogma Don't"	4:04
11.	"April/May"	5:05
12.	"Witch House"	4:31
