= Triage (Methyl Ethel album) =

Studio album by Methyl Ethel
- Released: 15 February 2019
- Length: 37:04
- Label: Dot Dash/4AD

Methyl Ethel chronology
Everything Is Forgotten (2017)	Triage (2019)	Are You Haunted? (2022)

Singles from Triage
- 1. "Scream Whole" Released: October 2018; 2. "Real Tight" Released: November 2018; 3. "Trip the Mains" Released: February 2019; 4. "Ruiner" Released: March 2019

Triage is the third studio album by Australian band Methyl Ethel. It was released on 15 February 2019 through Dot Dash/4AD Records.

In February 2020, Triage was nominated for the Australian Music Prize of 2019.

== Reception ==
Professional ratings
Aggregate scores
Source	Rating
Metacritic	67/100
Review scores
Source	Rating
AllMusic	3.5/5 stars
Consequence of Sound	B-
DIY	4/5 stars
Drowned in Sound	8/10

Marcy Donelson from AllMusic said "Triage was produced, performed, and recorded by Jake Webb at his home studio, though its lush, lopsided textures hardly sound like what was a solo effort until the mixing stage. Parts melancholy, trippy, and dancy, he combined programmed and traditional instruments, including his own synth timbres, layering them in ways that sound more like atmospheric arena fare than what was essentially a one-man recording project."

Brad Dountz from Consequence of Sound said "Every song from Methyl Ethel's latest album seems like it is trying to outdo all the others and that is never a bad thing. Triage is probably their best album yet because they only seem to be competing with themselves, which makes for the best form of uncompromising music."

== Track listing ==
All tracks are written by Jake Webb

No.	Title	Length
1.	"Ruiner"	4:19
2.	"Scream Whole"	4:12
3.	"All the Elements"	4:23
4.	"Trip the Mains"	3:49
5.	"Post-Blue"	5:16
6.	"Real Tight"	3:16
7.	"Hip Horror"	3:56
8.	"What About the 37º?"	3:49
9.	"No Fighting"	4:04
Total length:		37:04

== Charts ==
Chart	Peak position
Australian Albums (ARIA)	11

== Release history ==
Region	Date	Format	Label	Catalogue
Australia	15 February 2019	CD; digital download; LP; cassette; streaming	Dot Dash Recordings	DASH055CD /DASH055LPX
Worldwide	15 February 2019	CD; digital download; LP; streaming	4AD	4AD0114CD / 4AD0114LP
