= Methyl Ethel =

Australian art rock band

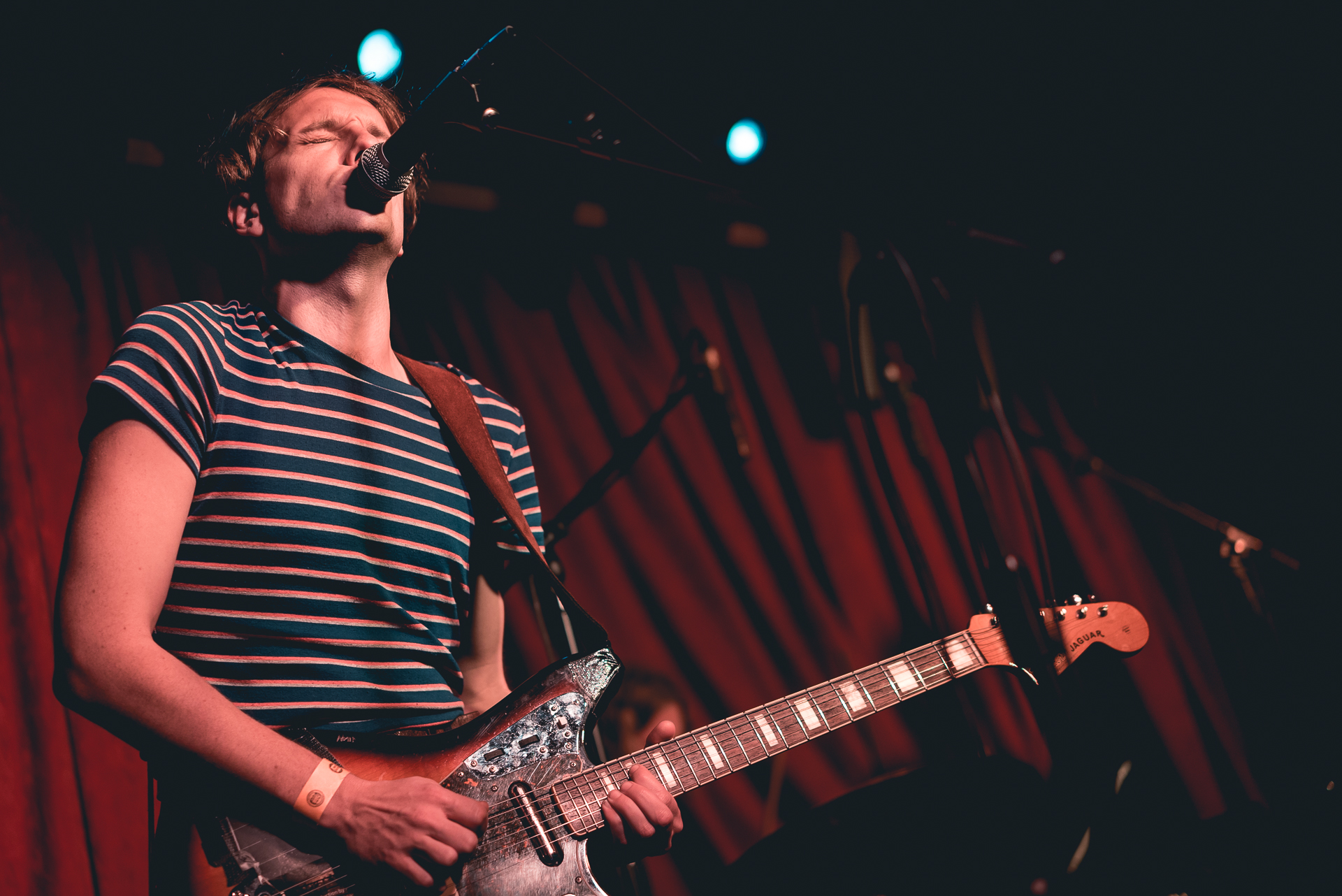
- Jake Webb performing with Methyl Ethel in 2016

Background information
- Origin: Perth, Western Australia
- Genres: Art rock; indie rock; synth-pop
- Years active: 2013–present
- Labels: 4AD (2013—20); Remote Control (2013—20); Future Classic (2021—)
- Members: Jake Webb
- Past members: Thom Stewart; Chris Wright; Hamish Rahm; Jacob Diamond; Lyndon Blue; Stella Donnelly
- Website: methylethel.com

Methyl Ethel is an Australian art rock band from Perth, signed to Future Classic in 2021 and formerly to Dot Dash and 4AD.

As a recording outfit, Methyl Ethel is the solo project of Jake Webb. When performing, Webb is joined by an accompanying band, whose core members were bassist Thom Stewart and drummer Chris Wright. Webb previously fronted Sugarpuss.

== Career ==
=== 2013–2020 ===
In March 2013, Methyl Ethel released their debut expended play, Guts, which was followed in November 2013 with Teeth. Lulu Ray from HappyMag said Guts is "very vocal heavy and the lyrics describe the suburban youth condition we can all relate to", whereas Teeth is "pretty different" and "Webb's voice is cool, calm and collected".

In June 2015, Methyl Ethel released their debut studio album Oh Inhuman Spectacle.

In March 2017, Methyl Ethel released their second album Everything Is Forgotten (co-produced by James Ford, who is best known for his work with Arctic Monkeys and Foals) to positive reviews from publications including NME. Everything Is Forgotten peaked at number 16 on the ARIA charts. They have supported acts including Pond.

In April 2017, the group released a limited edition double-A sided 12" LP single of "Architecture Lecture"/"Lagotto Romagnolo" from their debut EPs for Record Store Day.

On 26 September 2018, the band released the track "Scream Whole", their first new music in over a year as well as announcing some international tour dates.

In February 2019, Methyl Ethel released their third studio album, Triage. It peaked at number 11 on the ARIA Charts.

In February 2020, Methyl Ethel released "Majestic AF", the lead single from their EP, Hurts to Laugh, which was released on 10 April 2020. The EP is made up of songs that did not make the cut for Triage.

=== 2021–present: Future Classic and Are You Haunted? ===
In April 2021, Methyl Ethel released "Neon Cheap", the first single on new label Future Classic. This was followed in September with "Matters".

In January 2022, Methyl Ethel released the single "Proof" with Stella Donnelly, and announced the release of their fourth studio album, Are You Haunted?

In July 2022, Methyl Ethel released the stand-alone single "Talk Louder" ahead of their Splendour in the Grass appearance.

== Discography ==
=== Studio albums ===
Title	Details	Peak chart positions
Title	Details	AUS
Oh Inhuman Spectacle	Released: June 2015; Label: Dot Dash (DASH031CD); Format: CD, LP, digital download	—
Everything Is Forgotten	Released: March 2017; Label: Dot Dash (DASH044CD) / 4AD (CAD3701CD); Format: CD, LP, digital download, streaming	16
Triage	Released: February 2019; Label: Dot Dash (DASH055CD) / 4AD (4AD0114CD); Format: CD, LP, digital download, streaming	11
Are You Haunted?	Released: 18 February 2022; Label: Future Classic (FCL443CD); Format: CD, LP, digital download, streaming	22

=== Extended plays ===
Title	Details
Guts	Released: March 2013; Label: Methyl Ethel (me001); Format: digital download
Teeth	Released: November 2013; Label: Methyl Ethel; Format: digital download
Hurts to Laugh	Released: 10 April 2020; Label: Dot Dash; Format: digital download

=== Singles ===
Year	Title	Peak chart position	Certifications	Album
Year	Title	AUS	Certifications	Album
2015	"Rogue"	—		Oh Inhuman Spectacle
2015	"Twilight Driving"	—		Oh Inhuman Spectacle
2016	"Idée Fixe"	—		Oh Inhuman Spectacle
2016	"No. 28"	—		Everything Is Forgotten
2017	"Ubu"	106	ARIA: Platinum	Everything Is Forgotten
2017	"L'Heure des Sorcieres"	—		Everything Is Forgotten
2017	"Architecture Lecture"/"Lagotto Romagnolo"	— (Note: "Architecture Lecture"/"Lagotto Romagnolo" released as a 12" vinyl single, limited to 1000 copies, for Record Store Day.)		Guts/Teeth
2018	"Cry Me a River" {Triple J Like a Version}	—		Like a Version: Volume Twelve
2018	"Scream Whole"	—		Triage
2018	"Real Tight"	—		Triage
2019	"Trip the Mains"	—		Triage
2019	"Ruiner"	—		Triage
2020	"Majestic AF"	—		Hurts to Laugh
2020	"Charm Offensive"	—		Hurts to Laugh
2020	"Holy Days"	—		Bloom and Simmer (compilation)
2021	"Neon Cheap"	—		Are You Haunted?
2021	"Matters"	—		Are You Haunted?
2022	"Proof" (featuring Stella Donnelly)	—		Are You Haunted?
2022	"One and Beat"	—		Are You Haunted?
2022	"Talk Louder"	—		Non-album singles
2022	"Damn, I Wish I Was Your Lover" (featuring Hatchie)	—		Non-album singles

== Awards and nominations ==
=== AIR Awards ===
The Australian Independent Record Awards (commonly known informally as AIR Awards) is an annual awards night to recognise, promote and celebrate the success of Australia's Independent Music sector.

Year	Nominee / work	Award	Result
2018	Everything Is Forgotten	Best Independent Album	Won
2018	"Ubu"	Best Independent Single or EP	Nominated
2019	herself	Best Independent Artist	Nominated

=== Australian Music Prize ===
The Australian Music Prize (the AMP) is an annual award of $30,000 given to an Australian band or solo artist in recognition of the merit of an album released during the year of award. The commenced in 2005.

Year	Nominee / work	Award	Result
2015	Oh Inhumane Spectical	Australian Music Prize	Nominated
2019	Triage	Australian Music Prize	Nominated

=== J Award ===
The J Awards are an annual series of Australian music awards that were established by the Australian Broadcasting Corporation's youth-focused radio station Triple J. They commenced in 2005.

Year	Nominee / work	Award	Result
2017	Everything Is Forgotten	Australian Album of the Year	Nominated
2017	'Ubu'	Australian Video of the Year	Nominated

=== National Live Music Awards ===
The National Live Music Awards (NLMAs) are a broad recognition of Australia's diverse live industry, celebrating the success of the Australian live scene. The awards commenced in 2016.

Year	Nominee / work	Award	Result
2016	Methyl Ethel	The Heatseeker Award (Best New Act)	Nominated
2016	Methyl Ethel	West Australian Live Voice of the Year	Won
2017	Methyl Ethel	International Live Achievement (Group)	Nominated
2017	Methyl Ethel	Best Live Act of the Year (People's Choice)	Nominated
2018	Methyl Ethel	International Live Achievement (Band)	Nominated

=== WAM Song of the Year ===
The WAM Song of the Year was formed by the Western Australian Rock Music Industry Association Inc. (WARMIA) in 1985, with its main aim to develop and run annual awards recognising achievements within the music industry in Western Australia.

Year	Nominee / work	Award	Result (wins only)
2014	"Rogues"	Pop Song of the Year	Won

=== West Australian Music Awards ===
The West Australian Music Industry Awards (WAMIs) are annual awards presented to the local contemporary music industry, put on annually by the Western Australian Music Industry Association Inc (WAM).

Year	Nominee / work	Award	Result (wins only)
2015	Methyl Ethel	Best Pop Act	Won
2015	'Twilight Driving'	Best Single	Won
2016	Methyl Ethel	Best Pop Act	Won
2017	Methyl Ethel	Best Pop Act	Won
2017	Everything Is Forgotten	Best Album	Won
2017	Jake Webb (Methyl Ethel)	Best Male Vocalist	Won
