= Snowman (album) =

Studio album by Snowman
- Released: 23 September 2006
- Recorded: December 2005; Blackbird Studios
- Genre: Alternative rock
- Length: 58:58
- Label: Dot Dash/Inertia
- Producer: David Parkin, Snowman

Snowman chronology
| Zombies on the Airwaves of Paris (2004) | Snowman (2006) | The Horse, The Rat and The Swan (2008) |

Snowman is the self-titled debut album, released by the Australian alternative rockers, Snowman, on 23 September 2006 via Dot Dash. The group began recording it in December 2005 with Perth-based record producer, David Parkin, at Blackbird Studios. Three singles were released from the album, "Smoke & Mirrors", "You Are a Casino" and "Swimming with Sharks". They were all added to high rotation on national youth radio, Triple J. The album was featured on community radio stations RTRfm in Perth and FBI in Sydney. The 13 tracks highlight the group's signature sounds, including haunting and falsetto vocals, rock and roll guitars and rockabilly drums.

== Reception ==
Snowman received mixed reviews: Shane O'Donohue of Herald Sun's HiT opined "[the group] transcend their influences through sheer intensity and a wealth of ideas. The whole thing's a bit long (the 11-minute second last track, 'Wormwood', is too much, too late), but, small gripes aside, Snowman is a gripping debut. In a word: primal." FasterLouder's Kirsty Connor felt "[it] is eccentric, lively, and ultimately unstable... They flutter between murky, noise-based ballads and brutal, angular guitar-driven rockers as though the term genre was an insult." Amazon.com's editorial review observed "[they] make beautiful, jagged, swampy, hypnotic kinda sound, that can swerve from Scott Walker's dark romance to the Cramps jungle fever in the blink of a mascara'd eye."

== Track listing ==
1. "The Black Tide" - 4:17
2. "You Are a Casino" - 2:51
3. "Bloodmoney" - 4:59
4. "Smoke & Mirrors" - 3:04
5. "The Last Train Outta Town" - 5:56
6. "Vampire Blues" - 3:00
7. "Viva La Fever" - 3:27
8. "Red River" - 5:02
9. "Swimming with Sharks" - 2:38
10. "Cocaine Goldrush" - 5:14
11. "Shake Your Brains" - 1:21
12. "Wormwood" - 10:54
13. "The Curse" - 6:15

== Personnel ==
=== Snowman ===
- Andy Citawarman – guitar, violin, vocals, piano, keyboard, percussion
- Ross DiBlasso – drums, percussion
- Olga Hermanniusson – brass, vocals, saxophone, percussion
- Joe McKee – guitar, vocals, harmonica, theremin, trumpet, piano, keyboard, percussion, samples

=== Additional musicians ===
- Shaun Lee – violin ("The Black Tide")
- Daniel Russel – violin ("The Black Tide")
- Aaron Wyatt – viola ("The Black Tide")
- Tristan Parr – cello ("The Black Tide")
- Elliott Brannen – trumpet ("Bloodmoney" and "Smoke & Mirrors")
