= Ned Collette =

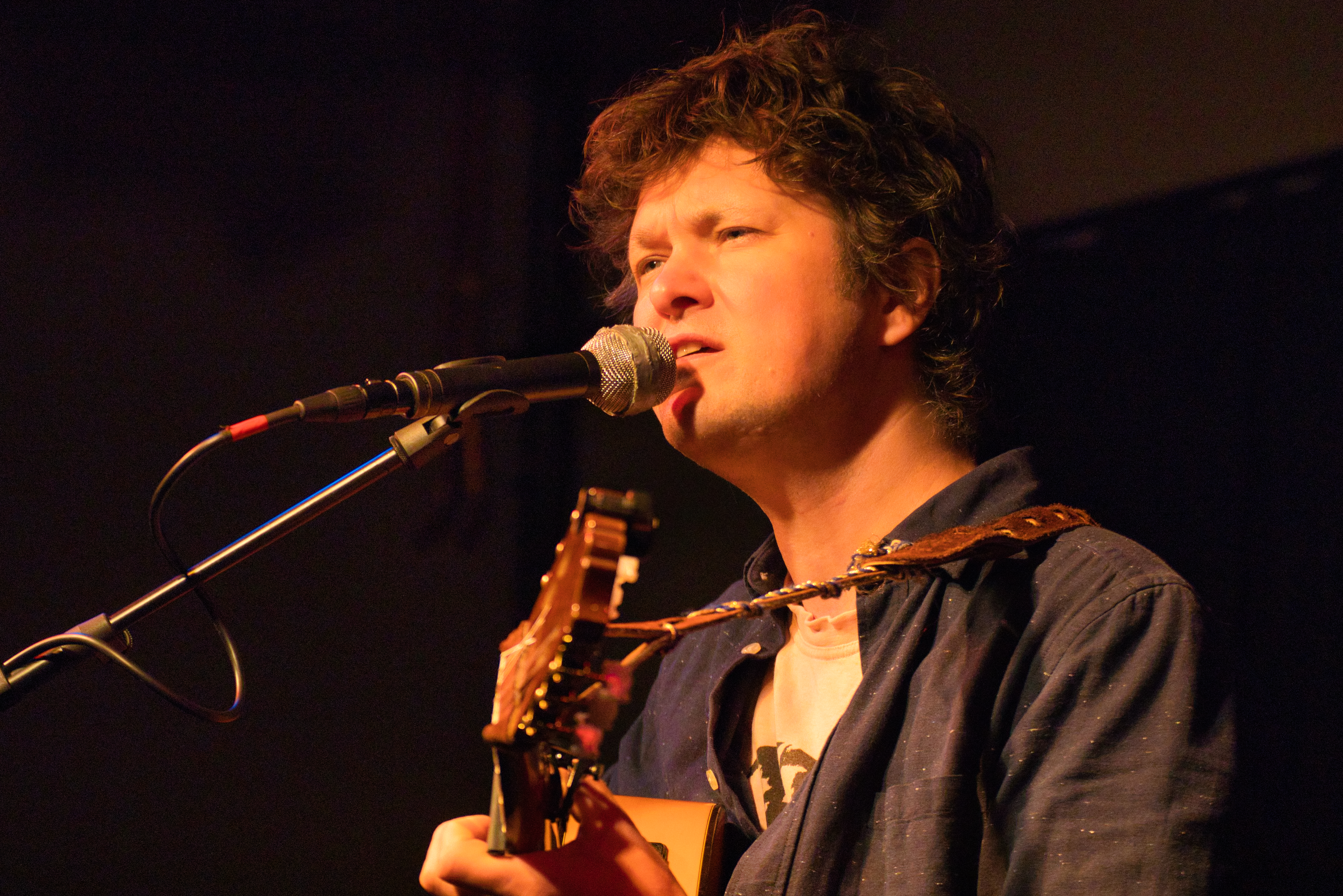

Background information
- Born: Carlton, Victoria, Australia
- Genres: Folk, rock, experimental
- Occupation: Musician
- Instruments: Voice, guitar, keyboards
- Years active: 1997–present
- Labels: Dot Dash Recordings; Bronze Rat Records; Fire Records; Holding Pattern; Escobar Records
- Website: nedcollette.com

Ned Collette is an Australian singer, instrumentalist, songwriter, and producer now based in Berlin. He was a member of Melbourne instrumental band City City City and has since then recorded eight albums, either as solo productions or with his band, Wirewalker.

== Background ==
Collette was born in the inner Melbourne suburb of Carlton, the only child of parents Susan Hancock, an author and English teacher at La Trobe University, and Adrian Collette, a former operatic baritone and later chief executive of Opera Australia. He graduated with a bachelor's degree in improvised music from the Victorian College of the Arts in 2000, and completed his honours in modern composition at Monash University in 2002.

He formed City City City, an improvisational and mostly instrumental band, and recorded two albums with them before signing to Australian label Dot Dash Recordings and releasing his debut solo album, Jokes and Trials, in July 2006. It drew influences from Paul Kelly, Nick Drake and Syd Barrett. During this time he performed solo, using loops to augment his electric guitar playing. Collette joined Bill Callahan and The National for a series of gigs in Australia and also toured Europe and Britain with harpist Joanna Newsom and indie pop band Camera Obscura.

In September 2007, he released his second album, Future Suture, which featured more complex synth arrangements and orchestration. Teaming with former City City City bandmates Ben Bourke (bass) and Joe Talia (drums) he toured the album in Australia under the name Ned Collette Band, striving to represent the album live. The album was 3RRR's Album of the Week and elicited comparisons with Damon Albarn, Bert Jansch and Leonard Cohen. In October 2008 the band undertook a 22-date tour of the UK, France, Switzerland, Austria, Germany, Poland, Luxembourg and the Netherlands, followed by a 10-date European solo tour in January 2009.

During this period Collette set up home in Glasgow, writing a new set of songs that abandoned the introspective singer-songwriter confessionals for more observed storytelling. Working at Talia's studio in back in country Victoria, the band recorded a second album, Over the Stones, Under the Stars, which returned to a simpler guitar/bass/drums sound. Collette and Talia then travelled to New York City to mix the album with American producer Joel Hamilton. The album was released on 23 October 2009 and received favorable critical reception. The band had earlier announced a name change to Ned Collette & Wirewalker, a reference to Philippe Petit and his Man on Wire film. Wirewalker added keyboardist James Rushford to the live lineup as they toured the album throughout Australia in November 2009. Collette moved to Berlin in early 2010 and the band played concerts throughout Europe in May.

A second Wirewalker album, titled 2, was released on 11 May 2012, through Dot Dash/Remote Control. Collette and Wirewalker also signed their first international licensing deal, with London-based Fire Records, who released the album worldwide (outside Australia and New Zealand) on 6 August. A media release said that while signifying that it was the second album released under that band name, "the title 2 also refers to the fact that the album is essentially a collaboration between Collette and Talia, with regular Wirewalker member Ben Bourke taking time off to be with his young family in Melbourne." Parts of the album were recorded with the two artists working separately—Collette in Berlin and Talia in Melbourne—although Talia spent six weeks in Berlin in mid-2011 to expand the recordings before Collette returned to Melbourne for final mixing. It features guest vocals by Gemma Ray and Laura Jean, among others. The album also features "For Roberto", an instrumental tribute to late Chilean writer Roberto Bolaño. The album received favorable reviews.

On 18 March 2014 it was announced that Collette's fifth album (and third with Wirewalker), Networking in Purgatory, would be released on 18 April 2014 through Dot Dash. The first single "Vanitas Quack" was made available to stream online.

== Discography ==
=== Albums ===
With City City City

- Dawn & The Blue Light District (Sensory Projects, 2004)
- The Perimeter Motor Show (Holding Pattern/Remote Control, 2005)

As Ned Collette

- Jokes & Trials (Dot Dash/Remote Control, 2006)
- Future Suture (Dot Dash/Remote Control, 2007)
- Old Chestnut (It Records/Feeding Tube Records, 2018)
- Quarantunes - limited live lathe cut (Feeding Tube Records, 2022)
- Our Other History (Sophomore Lounge Records, 2024)
- Mixed Light (It Records/Feeding Tube Records, 2026)

As Ned Collette & Wirewalker

- Over the Stones, Under the Stars (Dot Dash/Remote Control, 2009)
- 2 (Dot Dash/Remote Control, Fire Records, 2012)
- Networking in Purgatory (Dot Dash/Remote Control, Bronze Rat 2014)

Ned Collette, James Rushford, Joe Talia

- Afternoon—Dusk (Feeding Tube Records, 2019)

As a member of Rand & Holland

- Caravans (Spunk, 2007)

=== EPs and singles ===
- Test Patterns EP (CDR release 2004, repressed on Holding Pattern, 2006)
- The Pool is Full of Hats EP (featuring Wirewalker and remixes by Super Melody and Spiderface) (Dot Dash/Remote Control, 2010)
- Long You Lie / The Hedonist 7" Vinyl (with Joe Talia) (Escobar Records, 2011)
