= The Horse, the Rat and the Swan =

The Horse, The Rat and The Swan

Studio album by Snowman
- Released: 24 May 2008
- Recorded: Blackbird Studios
- Genre: Alternative rock
- Length: 38:07
- Label: Dot Dash Recordings
- Producer: Dave Parkin and Snowman

Snowman chronology
Snowman (2006)	The Horse, The Rat and The Swan (2008)	Absence (2011)

Professional ratings
Review scores
Source	Rating
Pitchfork Media	(8.0/10)
Polaroids of Androids	(9.5/10)
Sputnikmusic	4.5/5 stars

The Horse, The Rat, and The Swan is the second studio album for Perth band, Snowman. It was released on 24 May 2008 on Dot Dash Recordings. Snowman produced the album with Dave Parkin (The Panda Band, Red Jezebel) at Blackbird Studios in Perth, Western Australia. In an interview lead singer, Joe McKee explains the reasoning behind the name of the album.

The Horse, the Rat and the Swan are three different characters and themes that reoccur in the album. The Horse represents the apocalypse, the Rat represents betrayal and corruption, and the Swan is the letting go of all of this, realising that one cannot be consumed by these dark thoughts constantly because there needs to be beauty and letting go of that.

— Joe McKee

McKee goes on to explain how the band went around creating the album.

I think we wanted to strip things to their rawest form, and to make raw form interesting we had to rely on the rhythms being interesting. There is a big focus on the rhythms. We were all just making a whole lot of noise. It took a while to be happy with it. I mean, it’s not something that we sit around listening to. It was more of a relief to get it finished because it consumed us for such a long time. It broke us. But I think I can speak for the whole band and say that we are very proud of it. The subject matter was directly related to the solitary environment that we wrote in. I think we focused on isolating ourselves even more than we had in the past. We decided that we needed the album to be far more focused and cohesive than the first. The solitude in turn took its toll on our mental state, which may be the reason for the apocalyptic and bleak nature of the album as all of our fears and paranoias were seeping out slowly.

— Joe McKee

The first single to be lifted off the album was "We Are The Plague".

== Track listing ==
All songs were written by Snowman.

1. "Our Mother (She Remembers)" - 2:58
2. "We Are The Plague" - 3:27
3. "The Gods Of The Upper House" - 4:04
4. "The Blood Of The Swan" - 3:43
5. "Daniel Was A Timebomb" - 2:37
6. "A Re-Birth" - 3:25
7. "She Is Turning Into You" - 5:36
8. "The Horse (Parts 1 and 2)" - 6:00
9. "Diamond Wounds" - 6:16
