= Absence (Snowman album) =

2011 studio album by Snowman

Studio album by Snowman
- Released: 3 June 2011
- Recorded: Various Locations, London
- Genre: Alternative rock
- Length: 40:55
- Label: Dot Dash Recordings
- Producers: Aaron Cupples and Snowman

Snowman chronology
The Horse, The Rat and The Swan (2008)	Absence (2011)

Professional ratings
Review scores
Source	Rating
Faster Louder	(9/10)
One Thirty BPM	84%
Pitchfork	(8/10)

Absence is the third and final album for Australian band, Snowman. It was released on 3 June 2011 via Dot Dash Recordings. It was produced by Snowman and Aaron Cupples (The Drones, Dan Kelly, Paul Kelly) at various locations around London. Upon the release of the album, Snowman announced their split.

About the creative process behind the album, Joe McKee stated:

I collected these postcards not with any intention to make a record around them, but [because] essentially there was something about them that I wanted to achieve musically ... that I wanted to create musically. They were soothing, and there was something that I just liked looking at. They gave me some kind of security, even though they're quite cold. A lot of them are without people in them and there's almost like a removal of something. That's what this whole thing comes from. It's about a dislocation of yourself from a place, the dislocation of the focal point from a picture, or the focal sound from a song. It was about the removal of these things and creating a kind of audio environment for what I would imagine these pictures would sound like. That was texturally and sound-wise what we were aiming to do. That's where some of those ideas were born from, and by the time I got back to London we found a place in Walthamstow and we were all living together. When I looked at these photos, all of them had this element that I couldn't put my finger on. I couldn't say, "That's an angry one. That's making me feel 'romantic'. That's amorous" It had this absence of something, while not knowing quite what that was, and accepting it. We tried to communicate that same feeling musically.

— Joe McKee

== Track listing ==
All the words and music were written by Snowman.

1. "Snakes & Ladders" – 3:58
2. "Hyena" – 3:14
3. "White Wall" – 4:10
4. "Séance" – 5:00
5. "∆ (A)" – 6:08
6. "Memory Lost" – 5:27
7. "A Vanishing Act" – 6:08
8. "Absence" – 6:30
