= Dirty Penny =

American glam metal band

- Origin: Santa Cruz, California, United States
- Genre: Glam metal
- Years active: 2005–2011
- Label: Dirty Penny
- Past members: Binge Daniels; Johnny Prynce; Tyno Vincent; Spanky Savage
- Website: Official site

Dirty Penny was an American glam metal band from Santa Cruz, California, United States. Their music is identified as glam or sleaze metal, with their influences being Mötley Crüe, AC/DC, Skid Row, Judas Priest, Poison, and Guns N' Roses. Dirty Penny has currently released two albums, Take it Sleezy (2007), and Young & Reckless, released on September 17, 2009.

== History ==
Dirty Penny formed in Santa Cruz, California. They gained popularity by winning a "Battle of the Bands" run by jpotmusic.com. Their music has been described as "glittery-glam", "sex-fueled", and "leather-encased". It is reminiscent of 1980s glam metal made popular by Mötley Crüe, Poison, Guns N' Roses, RATT, and Skid Row.

Dirty Penny was originally a Poison cover band, ironically called Antidote. They later had to drop Antidote due to a Dutch band of the same name. Dirty Penny has since played at all three Rocklahoma Festivals.

Bassist Tyno Vincent said this about the band:

"We were into old-school punk, like The Misfits, when we first got into music, then got into glam as a fuck-you to our hometown...But punk's got a lot of rules, and that's not very punk. Rock'n'roll doesn't have any rules -- everybody can do drugs or not do drugs or dress however they want. A lot of people are tired of the screamo/I'm-not-okay thing. It's like, everyone's not okay, you know? Forget about it. Have fun. That's what you do with music -- you forget about your shit."

“Antidote was like our training wheels when we were learning how to play, but I consider the start of our band as being when we became Dirty Penny and recorded our album...There are a lot of haters...We’re labeled a cover band in Santa Cruz and that’ll probably never change, but it’s cool to go out and experience respect for what we’re doing now from older metal bands.”

Dirty Penny's debut album was Take it Sleezy, released on August 2, 2007. Young & Reckless was issued on September 17, 2009. For this album, Dirty Penny altered their look from their original "glittery-glam" to a more modern, less-showy getup. Fans tend to argue their music has not changed, despite their outward appearance.

In mid-2009, Dirty Penny embarked on the aforementioned headlining tour with Vains of Jenna. On this tour, Dirty Penny had a run-in with a woman who they deemed the "crazy bitch". She followed the band and asked for a free ride to Los Angeles, which they refused due to space restrictions. After they took off for LA, she followed them for a good while down the freeway. Something took over this woman, and she decided to ram Dirty Penny's van multiple times while driving. This incident resulted in their Young & Wrecked tour poster.

On October 25, 2010, Dirty Penny's social sites posted that lead singer Binge Daniels has left the band on good terms. On February 14, 2011, Jonny, using his real name of Ian MacPherson, appeared with his sister and the band Wildstreet on Late Night with Jimmy Fallon in a skit to have his hair permed. Ian referred to Wildstreet as 'his band'. Bassist "Tyno Vincent" (real name Tyler Molinaro) joined American Idol finalist, James Durbin's solo band for his tour in 2011/12.

== Members ==
All members of the band have adopted pseudonyms, or different names.

- Vocals - Binge Daniels (Matt Biggam)
- Guitar - Jonny Prynce (Ian MacPherson)
- Bass - Tyno Vincent (Tyler Molinaro)
- Drums - Spanky Savage (Spencer Joseph)
