= Race the Fray =

Australian band

- Also known as: Table 9, The Fray
- Origin: Melbourne, Victoria, Australia
- Genres: Alternative rock, pop punk
- Years active: 2003–2008
- Labels: Fray, Zudio
- Past members: Alister "Mac" Murrell; Callum "Cal" Reeves; Nicholas "Astro" Russo; Andrew "Swifty" Swift; Karl Russo

Race the Fray (originally seen as The Fray) were an Australian independent four-piece alternative rock, pop punk band formed in 2003. The line-up consisted of Alister "Mac" Murrell on drums; Callum "Cal" Reeves on bass guitar; Nicholas "Astro" Russo on vocals and guitar; and Andrew "Swifty" Swift on guitar. In November 2004 they issued their debut self-titled extended play, The Fray, they followed with a second EP, This Art Will Play, under Race the Fray, in September 2005. In 2007 Karl Russo replaced Swift on guitar and the group disbanded in 2008.

== History ==
Race the Fray were formed in Melbourne on 25 June 2003 as The Fray, an alternative rock and pop punk band, with Alister "Mac" Murrell on drums; Callum "Cal" Reeves on bass guitar; Nicholas "Astro" Russo on vocals and guitar; and Andrew "Swifty" Swift on guitar. Murrell, Russo and Swift had attended the same school in Beaconsfield, Russo met Reeves at a garage sale. From March 2003 Reeves, Russo and Swift performed as Table 9, by late April Murrell had joined and in June the group were named The Fray. Swift later recalled starting training on guitar and vocals " [i]t helped with depression and gave me a goal to work towards ... I started working in local pubs and cafes and then one of the guys from school and I formed 'Race the Fray'". Known locally as The Fray, the independent band relied on word-of-mouth during their early career. In August 2003 they issued their debut single, "My Best Friend" and followed in November with a limited tour edition. In November 2004 their self-titled debut extended play, The Fray, was released. The track, "Always Away", was played on national radio stations including Triple J. The band featured as Nova 100's Made in Melbourne band, and FReeZA's band of the month.

In September 2005 they issued their second EP, This Art Will Play, which was engineered and produced by Hugh Counsell (Deloris) for their own Fray label and distributed by Zudio Music. It featured in the top 10 of the Association of Independent Record Labels charts for several weeks before peaking at #3. In August they toured Australia to promote the EP. In September 2006 they appeared on national TV variety show, Rove Live. Their double a-side single, "Our Future's on the Weekend" / "Fumbling Mess", was released in November that year following the band's second national tour. Late in 2006 Swift left the band to pursue a solo career, he was replaced early the following year by Karl Russo (ex-Drake) on guitar.

In January and February 2007 they performed a series of gigs in Melbourne, including one being supported by Swift. In Music & Media's Christie Eliezer described them as "art conscious, indie rockers" who had "emerged with a new guitarist, countless half written classics and a renewed enthusiasm for the road and the chaotic splendours of the stage" after spending some months off the road. According to the band's website they were recording material for a proposed studio album from July 2007, however no new material was issued by April 2008. By March 2009 the website was no longer being updated.

== Band members ==
- Alister "Mac" Murrell – drums (2003–08)
- Callum "Cal" Reeves – bass guitar (2003–08)
- Nicholas "Astro" Russo – vocals, guitar (2003–08)
- Andrew "Swifty" Swift – guitar (2003–06)
- Karl Russo – guitar (2007–08)
