= Teeth & Tongue =

Australian musical project

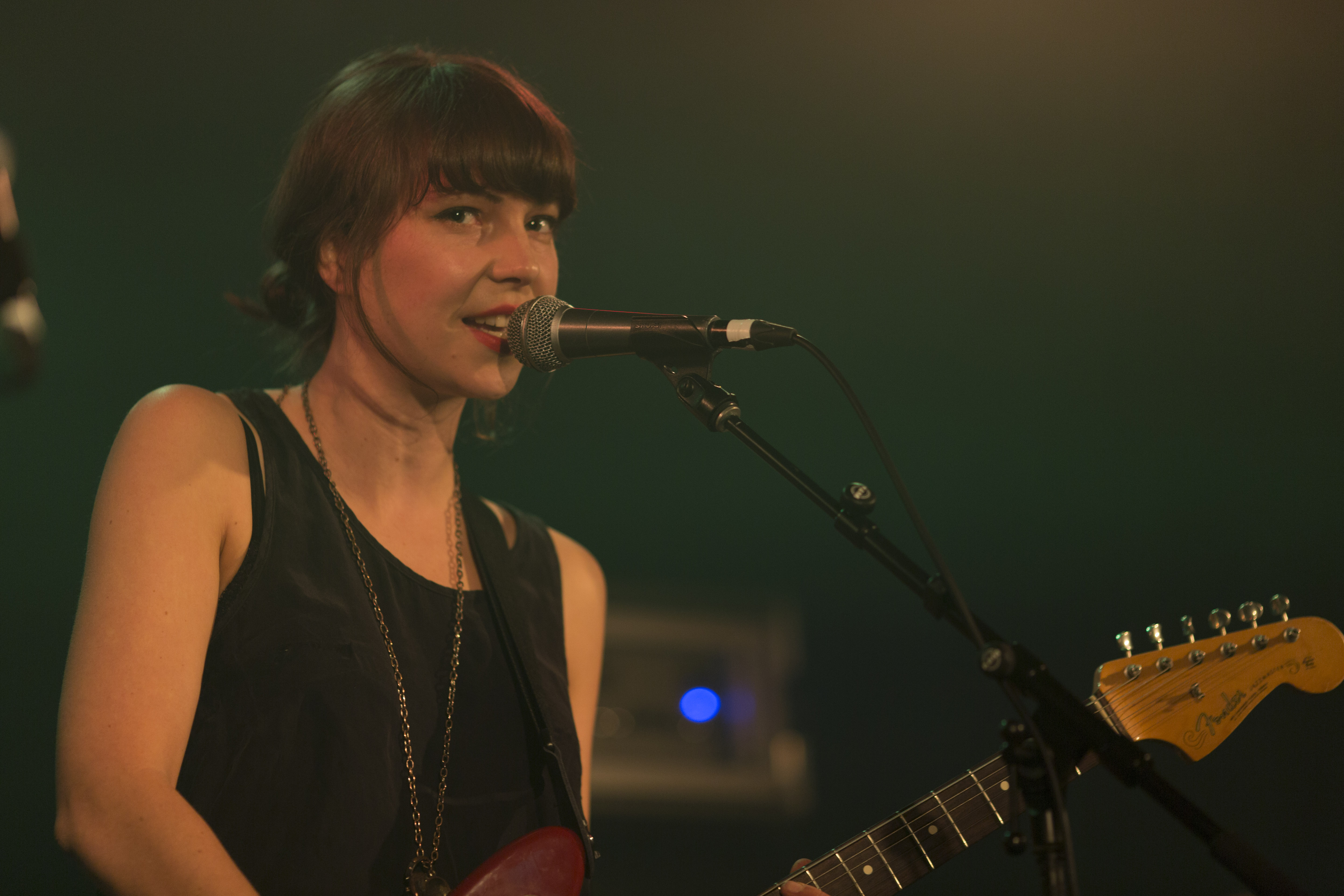
- Teeth & Tongue, Oxford Arts Factory, Sydney, August 2014

Background information
- Origin: Melbourne, Victoria, Australia
- Genre: Indie rock
- Years active: 2007–2017
- Labels: Dot Dash; Remote Control; Inertia; Omnian
- Past members: See below
- Website: teethandtongue.com

Teeth & Tongue were an Australian indie rock band formed in 2007 by Jessica Claire Cornelius, a New Zealand-born singer-songwriter and musician. The project has included other members, such as James Harvey on drums, Marc Regueiro-McKelvie on guitar and Damian Sullivan on bass guitar and synthesiser. Teeth & Tongue released four albums, Monobasic (November 2008), Tambourine (April 2011), Grids (March 2014) and Give Up on Your Health (September 2016), before disbanding early in 2017. The stage name had also been used for Cornelius' solo performances, but since 2017 she has performed and released material under her own name and relocated to Los Angeles late that year.

== History ==
Teeth & Tongue were formed in Melbourne in 2007 by Jessica Cornelius (ex-Moscow Schoolboy) on lead vocals, keyboards and guitar, as a vehicle for her song-writing. She recalled, "you either want a fully-collaborative band in which everyone has input into everything, or you just have your own project, and say 'this is my band, do you want to help with it?'" Cornelius was born in c. 1980 and grew up in Ngāruawāhia, New Zealand before moving to Wellington as a teenager. She relocated to Melbourne in 2000 where, "she cycled through scores of bands, before one she fronted, the snarling Moscow Schoolboy, stuck."

Teeth and Tongue's debut album, Monobasic, was issued in November 2008 via Inertia Records/Crystal Chain Records with Cornelius co-producing with Casey Rice. For the album Cornelius was joined by Rice on guitar and EBow, Ricky French on guitar, Ben MacDonald on keyboards, Patrick Millman on bass guitar, Cesar Rodgrigues on guitar, Joe Talia on drums, Ian Wadley on guitar. It received critical acclaim from Australian media, including rotation airplay on Triple J and FBi Radio, Album of the Week on Radio Adelaide, and reviews in Rolling Stone, Triple J Magazine, Who Weekly and Yen Magazine.

Teeth & Tongue, with the line-up of Cornelius, Steve Masterson, Marc Reguiro-Mckelvie and "Patto" Millman, were chosen as Triple J's radio programme Home & Hosed's Next Crop artist in November 2009. Steph Hughes of that programme explained, "Her latest songwriting output has seen the group remaining true to initial brooding sensibilities – with an added special sauce. At any turn a Teeth & Tongue song could be sludgy, melodic, metronomic – or a patchwork of them all. It's meticulously constructed but by no means restrained."

Tambourine, their second album, was released in April 2011 via Dot Dash Recordings/Remote Control Records, which was co-produced by Cornelius and Simon Grounds. It was listed as Album of the Week on 3RRR FM, Radio Adelaide, RTR FM and Edge Radio. The line-up was Cornelius (now also on drum machine) and Reguiro-McKelvie were joined on some tracks by Masterson on live drums and Brigitte Hart on backing vocals and percussion. According to The Beat's interviewer, "she wanted to record an album based primarily on the use of drum machines. But it was the long gestation of Tambourine that allowed Cornelius to examine exactly how she wanted the album to sound, and what she wanted it to represent as a record." The Age's reviewer rated Tambourine at four stars, The Vine's writer observed, "One of the best Australian releases this year".

Kat Mahina of The AU Review caught a live gig in July 2011, where, "Cornelius was in fine form and visibly less nervous than she was at her own album launch a few weeks ago. The young chanteuse let her vocals soar and her dirty, bluesy, pop was all encompassing. [She] has a sweet, understated presence and the music really took off." The album's first single, "Unfamiliar Skirts", received The Age's EG Award nomination for Song of the Year in October 2011.

In March 2012 Teeth & Tongue undertook a solo North American tour, including performances at the SXSW festival and New York's Piano's. VH1's Mark Graham saw both of the latter shows, "[she] has a beguiling, sultry sound, one that to this listener lies somewhere between Cat Power and Bat For Lashes. She's got a real knack for setting the scene in her songwriting, and has a novelist's gift for conveying the kind of minute details in her lyrics that really put the listener in her head space. The tour was also reviewed by Nylon Magazine and MTV. Teeth & Tongue returned to the US in October of that year with a full band for CMJ Music Marathon where they appeared on USA Today's list CMJ 2012: What you should be listening to Now. Followed by a live performance on East Village Radio. Also in that year they were nominated for another EG Award, for Outstanding Achievement. Cornelius, as a solo act, joined a live 12-date SBS RocKwiz tour during 2012. She has appeared on the related TV show twice: in 2011 as a duet with Mike Rudd of cover version of Roy Orbison's "Crying", and in 2013 covering "Take Another Little Piece of my Heart" with Joe Camilleri. In 2013 Cornelius was one of the musical artists in the National Gallery of Victoria's exhibition, "Wired for Melbourne Sound"; where musicians wrote and recorded an extended play live in a public gallery. Evelyn Morris was also a part of the project.

Teeth & Tongue's third album, Grids, was released in March 2014, with a line-up of Cornelius and Reguiro-Mckelvie joined in the recording studio by Damian Sullivan on bass guitar and synthesiser. It was co-produced by Cornelius with A J Bradford for Remote Control Records. Peter Luscombe provided drums for the album. It was named Album of the Week on RRR FM, Radio Adelaide, and by Beat Magazine, and Feature Album on ABC's Double J and on RTRFM radio. Jake Cleland, of music website thevine.com.au, observed, "equal parts piano balladry, electronic squall and guitar buzz, but its most distinct component is Cornelius's voice. One moment a David Bowie yawp, the next a Kate Bush howl, another soulful crooning, and occasionally joining herself in choirs both weeping and thunderous, Grids features some of her most adventurous vocal work to date."

The second single, and video from the album, "Good Man", premiered on Pages Digital, A writer for Australian Independent Record Labels Association (AIR) described it as "jawdropping" and "breathtaking" and explained, "We've never heard a song like it before. The star is the arrangement – A single organ, a smattering of feedback, some gated drums and Jess' multi-layered, multi-textured vocals dominating out front." The next single, "Newborn", featured Laura Jean and was launched with an accompanying video displaying syncopated dance moves by body builders. The album received three more The Age EG Award nominations: Best Band, Best Album and Best Female Artist.

During 2014, Teeth & Tongue had expanded to a five-piece band to recreate the Grids album for live shows, Cornelius, Reguiro-Mckelvie and Sullivan were joined by James Harvey on drums and Jade McInally on backing vocals, keyboards and percussion. That year they performed at Meredith Music Festival, Boogie Festival, White Night Melbourne, Friday Nights at the National Gallery of Victoria and New Year's Eve, as well as touring Australia to promote Grids — including a performance at MONA in Tasmania. In February 2015 took part in the Nes Artist Residency in Skagaströnd, northern Iceland, for two months, where she composed on new material. The group's single, "Cupcake", released in April 2015, included a video shot at the residency and through vehicle windows while driving around the town.

The group's fourth album, Give Up on Your Health, reached No. 2 on the ARIA Hitseekers Albums chart in September 2016. It was named Feature Album on 3RRR and described as an, "adventurous and accomplished album of smart, sophisticated pop", by their writer. The album was also named feature album on Double J and Teeth & Tongue was nominated for a J Award for Double J Australian Artist of the Year alongside King Gizzard and the Lizard Wizard and Ngaiire. At the Age Music Victoria Awards 2016, Teeth & Tongue was nominated for Best Song ("Dianne") and Cornelius was nominated for Best Female Artist. In the US, Teeth & Tongue were featured in Rolling Stone as one of '"Ten New Artists You Need to Know" in August of that year. Giselle Bueti of The AU Review saw their gig in February 2017, "delivered a bone shakingly sweet set... [they] deliver a dynamic live show. Each song is enhanced; with an almost darker, more spine tingling feel." The group disbanded early in that year with Cornelius concentrating on her solo career.

=== Touring ===
Teeth & Tongue has supported J Mascis, Vance Joy, EMA, The Drones, The Mountain Goats, The Dodos, Laura Marling, Courtney Barnett, Juana Molina, Sons and Daughters (band), Jack Ladder, Adalita and Dan Kelly in Australia. Teeth & Tongue toured Europe in 2010, playing Gea Festival in Tarragona alongside Lydia Lunch. Teeth & Tongue has played at several festivals, including Meredith Music Festival, Falls Festival, St Jerome's Laneway Festival, Boogie Festival, Perth Festival, Darwin Festival, Beechworth Festival, and the White Night festivals in Melbourne.

== 2017–present: Jess Cornelius, solo ==
In September 2017 Cornelius released a single, "Jealousy", as Jess Cornelius and toured the US supporting Australian singer-songwriter, Paul Kelly. In the following month she released a five-track EP, Nothing Is Lost. Following its release Cornelius relocated to Los Angeles and began working on new music. In February 2019 she issued another single, "No Difference".

== Members ==
- Jess Cornelius – lead vocals, keyboards, guitar, bass guitar, drum machine (2007–17)
- Patrick "Patto" Millman – bass guitar (2008–10)
- Steve Masterson – drums (2009–10)
- Marc Regueiro-McKelvie – guitar (2009–17)
- Damian Sullivan – bass guitar, synthesiser (2013–17)
- James Harvey – drums (2014–17)
- Jade McInally – backing vocals, keyboards, percussion (2014–16)
- Cheyenne Harper – keyboards (2017)

== Discography ==
=== Albums ===
Title	Details
Monobasic	Released: November 2008; Label: Crystal Chain (CC001CD); Format: CD, digital download
Tambourine	Released: April 2011; Label: Dot Dash (DASH019CD); Format: CD, digital download
Grids	Released: March 2014; Label: Dot Dash (DASH025CD/DASH025LP); Format: CD, LP, digital download
Give Up on Your Health	Released: September 2016; Label: Dot Dash (DASH037CD/DASH037LP); Format: CD, LP, digital download, streaming

=== Singles ===
Year	Title	Album
2008	"There Is a Lightness to My Bones"	Monobasic
2009	"Sad Sun"	Tambourine
2012	"The Party Is You"	Grids
2013	"Good Man"	Grids
2014	"Newborn"	Grids
2015	"Cup Cakes"	Give Up on Your Health
2016	"Dianne"	Give Up on Your Health
2016	"Turn, Turn, Turn"	Give Up on Your Health

== Awards and nominations ==
=== J Award ===
The J Awards are an annual series of Australian music awards that were established by the Australian Broadcasting Corporation's youth-focused radio station Triple J. They commenced in 2005.

Year	Nominee / work	Award	Result
J Awards of 2016	themselves	Double J Artist of the Year	Nominated

=== Music Victoria Awards ===
The Music Victoria Awards, are an annual awards night celebrating Victorian music. They commenced in 2005.

Year	Nominee / work	Award	Result
2014	Grids	Best Album	Nominated
2014	themselves	Best Band	Nominated
2014	Jess Cornelius	Best Female Artist	Nominated
2016	"Dianne"	Best Song	Nominated
2016	Jess Cornelius	Best Female Artist	Nominated
