= Snowman (band) =

Australian indie rock band

- Origin: Perth, Western Australia
- Genres: Indie rock
- Years active: 2002–2011
- Label: Dot Dash Recordings
- Past members: Andy Citawarman; Joe McKee; Olga Hermanniusson; Ross DiBlasio

Snowman was a band originally from Perth, Western Australia. They formed in 2002, relocated to London in 2008, and disbanded in 2011.

== History ==
=== 2002-2005: Formation and Zombies on the Airwaves of Paris ===
Snowman began playing together in various incarnations and under different names during their high school years. Joe McKee and Andy Citawarman met when they were fourteen years old; they began writing music together almost immediately. Olga Hermanniusson soon joined on Bass guitar and saxophone. After a few line-ups and name changes, the band settled on Snowman with new drummer Ross DiBlasio joining in 2002. In 2003 they began playing live around Australia. They also recorded two demo CDs, which included early versions of "Lost in the Woods", "The Horror Song", "Moodswing" and a track that would go through many changes to eventually become "Wormwood".

In 2003, the band won The Next Big Thing competition and began recording an EP later that year. Zombies on the Airwaves of Paris was released in September 2004 and distributed by Shock Records in Australia. It garnered positive reviews nationally. National tours with Interpol, Regurgitator, The Mint Chicks and Wolfmother soon followed, as well as a publishing deal with Mushroom Music Publishing.

In 2005 the band was nominated for six WAMi Awards, winning the Favourite Newcomer award.

=== 2006-2011: Studio albums, awards and break up ===
In 2006, the band signed with Melbourne-based indie label Dot Dash Records and began recording their self-titled debut album with Perth Producer David Parkin at Blackbird Studios. Snowman was released on 23 September 2006 to positive reviews. They toured Australia extensively in the year that followed, playing the national Big Day Out tour, Meredith Music Festival, Laneway Festivals, and supported Liars, Wolf & Cub and The Drones on their respective national tours.

In 2006 the band was nominated for two WAMi Awards: with Citawarman winning the Best Male Vocalist Award.

At the 2007 WAMi Awards, Snowman won three WAMI awards for 'Most Popular Album' (Snowman), 'Most Popular Music Video' ("You Are A Casino") and 'Best Rock Act'.

"You Are a Casino" was released as a limited 7" single in the UK on 25 June 2007 on the Passport Label, through Forte Distribution

In January 2008, Snowman announced that they were recording their second album with David Parkin. The Horse, The Rat and The Swan was released on 24 May 2008. It received critical acclaim throughout Australia, polling at number one on the Mess and Noise end of year critic's poll. and receiving a positive review and honorable mention in Pitchfork's end of year poll.

In late 2008, Snowman relocated to London, England. The next two years saw Snowman write a new record with Australian producer Aaron Cupples.

On 23 November 2010, Snowman announced the title, Absence, and track listing of their upcoming album. The album was released on 3 June 2011. Upon its release Snowman formally announced that they had split up.

== Band members ==
- Andy Citawarman (b. Indonesia, 1984) – guitar/vocals/violin/keys
- Joe McKee (b. England, 1984) – guitar/vocals/gammalan
- Olga Hermanniusson (b. Australia, 1983) – bass/vocals/saxophone
- Ross DiBlasio (b. Australia 1985) – drums/percussion

== Discography ==
=== Albums ===
Title	Details
Snowman	Released: September 2006; Label: Dot Dash (DASH005CD); Format: CD
The Horse, the Rat and the Swan	Released: 24 May 2008; Label: Dot Dash (DASH10CD); Format: CD
Absence	Released: 3 June 2011; Label: Dot Dash (DASH017CD); Format: CD

=== Extended plays ===
Title	Details
Zombies of the Airwaves of Paris	Released: 2004; Label: The Snowman Empire (Snowman001); Format: CD

== Awards ==
=== West Australian Music Industry Awards ===
The West Australian Music Industry Awards are annual awards celebrating achievements for Western Australian music. They commenced in 1985.

Year	Nominee / work	Award	Result (wins only)
2005	Snowman	Favourite Newcomer	Won
2006	Andy Citawarman (Snowman)	Best Male Vocalist	Won
2007	"You Are a Casino"	Most Popular Music Video	Won
2007	Snowman	Most Popular Album	Won
2007	Snowman	Best Rock Act	Won
