= Fire! Santa Rosa, Fire! =

Australian indie rock band

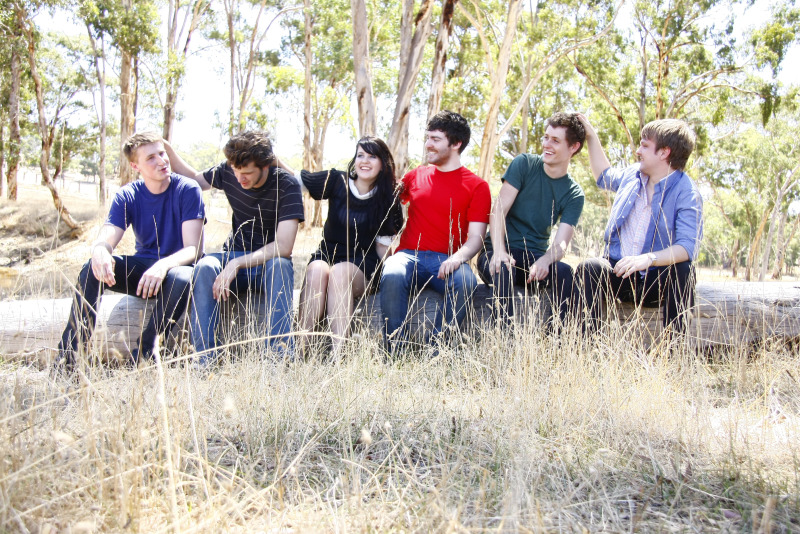
- Fire! Santa Rosa, Fire! - from left Sam Stearne, Josh Flavel, Caitlin Duff, David Williams, Nathaniel Morse, Artyom Zinoviev

Background information
- Origin: Adelaide, South Australia, Australia
- Genres: Rock, Indie
- Years active: 2005–2014
- Labels: Dot Dash
- Members: Sam Stearne (drums); Josh Flavel (bass); Caitlin Duff (vocals); David Williams (vocals/guitar); Nathaniel Morse (guitar)
- Past members: Grant Badcock (guitar); Andrew Walenczykiewicz (guitar); Art Zinoviev (synth)

Fire! Santa Rosa, Fire! was an indie rock group from Adelaide, South Australia. They describe their musical style as "monolithic tech-pop". They released the independent EPs You Seize the City, I'll Seize the Sky (2006) and Boy, Hush Yr Mouth, Grrl Bare Yr Teeth (2007), and full-length studio album Sea Priest (2010). In 2014, they announced that they had disbanded.

== History ==
=== 2005-2009: Origins and early EPs ===
The band met and formed during their time at Adelaide High School, where Williams, Stearne, Flavel and Zinoviev attended. After meeting and rehearsing cover songs for most of 2005, the group purchased the necessary equipment to perform live, and began playing regular shows in local Adelaide venues. In 2006, Fire! Santa Rosa, Fire! completed the independent EP You Seize the City, I'll Seize the Sky, and were invited to play Adelaide's Big Day Out. In early 2007, the band approached Caitlin Duff to take over from David as lead vocalist.

After performing at the Big Day Out and Parklife festivals, the band were placed in high rotation on Triple J radio, receiving considerable airplay. The band won a spot on the 2008 Homebake line-up thanks to Triple J's Unearthed competition and was featured in Rip It Up Magazine as an Adelaide act set to make a play for national attention in 2009.

Throughout the summer of 2009, the band performed once again at the Big Day Out festival in Adelaide, as well as the Adelaide Laneway Festival, and Come Together Festival in Sydney. In July/August 2009, Fire! Santa Rosa, Fire! released the iTunes-only EP Animal Spirit Guide, touring across the country with Hungry Kids of Hungary and Tom Ugly.

Throughout 2009, the band played shows supporting the likes of Sia, The Bumblebeez, and Bertie Blackman, and were shortlisted as one of the ten finalists for the Qantas Spirit of Youth award. In September 2009, Fire! Santa Rosa, Fire! announced the addition of a second guitarist, Nathaniel Morse, to complement their line up, embarking on a short Australian east coast tour with I Heart Hiroshima.

=== 2010- Debut album and touring ===
On 19 March 2010, Fire! Santa Rosa, Fire! released their debut studio album Sea Priest through Dot Dash, alongside lead single "Little Cowboys, Bad Hombres". The song gained airplay with Australian youth radio stations Triple J and FBi. They toured throughout May and June in support of the album, as well as playing opening support to Dappled Cities on their 'Winter Tour' with the John Steel Singers. Additional tours included St. Vincent, Band of Skulls and Kimbra.

In December 2012, the band released "Codebreaker".

They announced they had disbanded via Facebook in September 2014.

== Discography ==
=== Studio albums ===
Title	Details
Sea Priest	Released: March 2010; Label: Dot Dash; Format: CD, digital download

=== Extended plays ===
Title	Details
You Seize the City, I'll Seize the Sky	Released: 2006; Label: self-released; Format: CD, digital download
Boy, Hush Yr Mouth, Grrl Bare Yr Teeth	Released: 2007; Label: self-released; Format: CD, digital download

=== Singles ===
Title	Year	Album
"War Coward"	2009	Sea Priest
"Animal Spirit Guide"	2009	Sea Priest
"Little Cowboys, Bad Hombres"	2010	Sea Priest
"Codebreaker"	2012	non album single

== Awards ==
=== Fowler's Live Music Awards ===
The Fowler's Live Music Awards took place from 2012 to 2014 to "recognise success and achievement over the past 12 months [and] celebrate the great diversity of original live music" in South Australia. Since 2015 they're known as the South Australian Music Awards.

Year	Nominee / work	Award	Result (wins only)
2012	Fire! Santa Rosa, Fire!	Best Indie Artist	Won
