= We Are Busy Bodies =

Canadian record label and music company

We Are Busy Bodies is a Canadian independent record label and music company based in Toronto, Ontario. Founded in 2005 by music promoter and entrepreneur Eric Warner, the label releases music by Canadian and international artists across a wide range of genres, including indie rock, experimental music, jazz, electronic music, folk and psychedelic music. It is known for its eclectic catalogue, international reissue projects and unconventional physical record formats.

The company also operates several subsidiary imprints, including Having Fun Records, Record Record Label and Busy Buddies. In 2025, the label celebrated its twentieth anniversary with a five-day festival in Toronto, coinciding with its 200th release, Everything Is Possible by Peace Flag Ensemble.

== History ==
=== Formation and early years (2005–2018) ===
We Are Busy Bodies was founded in 2005 by Eric Warner, who had previously worked in concert promotion and music booking.

Initially operating alongside Warner's concert promotion and booking activities, the label developed into a platform for emerging Canadian independent musicians. Its early catalogue included artists such as METZ, Doldrums, The DeathSet, Cuff the Duke, DD/MM/YYYY, Limblifter and Rich Aucoin.

Warner described the label as a means of supporting emerging musicians and providing opportunities for artists to reach wider audiences. The company developed alongside his work in concert promotion, festival booking and artist management.

=== International expansion (2019–present) ===
Following a period of reduced activity, We Are Busy Bodies relaunched in 2019 with an expanded focus on international artists, archival recordings and new releases. Its catalogue increasingly incorporated music from outside the Canadian independent rock scene, including South African and Japanese jazz, African funk and soul, experimental electronic music and international folk traditions.

Its international releases have included archival recordings and projects involving South African jazz musicians, alongside funk and soul recordings from Africa. The label has also released contemporary music by artists including New Age Doom, Blk Jks, Peace Flag Ensemble and Lee "Scratch" Perry.

In 2022, the company announced the establishment of a North American booking division, intended to create touring opportunities for international artists and expand its activities beyond record releases.

In 2023, the label established Record Record Label, an imprint dedicated primarily to limited vinyl reissues of Canadian albums that had previously been released only on CD or in limited vinyl editions. Its initial projects included reissues by The Monoxides, Wide Mouth Mason and The Waking Eyes.

In 2025, the label celebrated its twentieth anniversary with a five-day festival in Toronto, featuring performances by The Bug Club, No Frills, Newfound Interest in Connecticut, The Elwins and other artists associated with the label. The anniversary also coincided with the release of Everything Is Possible, the third album by Saskatchewan-based ambient jazz group Peace Flag Ensemble, identified as the company's 200th release.

== Artists ==
We Are Busy Bodies has released music by Canadian and international artists working across independent rock, experimental music, jazz, electronic music, folk and psychedelic music.

Artists associated with the label include METZ, Doldrums, Rich Aucoin, Limblifter, Cuff the Duke, The Death Set, DD/MM/YYYY, Odonis Odonis, The Bug Club, New Age Doom, Peace Flag Ensemble, Blk Jks, Lee "Scratch" Perry, Gwenifer Raymond and Beefheart & McQuinn.

The label's catalogue includes both new recordings and reissues, reflecting its genre-spanning approach to independent music. Its more recent releases have included recordings by Welsh guitarist Gwenifer Raymond and psychedelic folk duo Beefheart & McQuinn.

== Reissues and international music ==
A significant part of We Are Busy Bodies' catalogue is devoted to reissues and recordings that have received limited distribution or have been unavailable for extended periods. Its projects have explored musical traditions from South Africa, Japan and other regions, including jazz, funk, soul and regional folk music.

The label has also become known for unusual physical releases, including picture discs, playable postcards, experimental vinyl formats and distinctive packaging. Its projects have included records incorporating unconventional materials and formats, such as playable X-ray records and vinyl incorporating food products. These releases have been discussed in coverage of the label's twentieth anniversary by Exclaim!.

The company has also undertaken projects and collaborations involving cultural organisations such as Smithsonian Folkways and the National Film Board of Canada.

== Subsidiary labels ==
We Are Busy Bodies operates several imprints covering different areas of its catalogue.

=== Record Record Label ===
Record Record Label focuses primarily on limited-edition vinyl reissues, particularly Canadian recordings that were previously unavailable on vinyl or had received limited pressings. Its projects have included releases by The Monoxides, Wide Mouth Mason and The Waking Eyes.

=== Having Fun Records ===
Having Fun Records was launched in January 2025 as an imprint focusing on rock, pop, indie rock and related genres. Its first announced signing was British band Pale Blue Eyes for the North American release of their album New Place. The imprint also announced releases by Beta Trip, a project associated with Canadian musician Steve Lewin.

=== Busy Buddies ===
Busy Buddies is the company's family-oriented music imprint, focusing on children's music and related recordings.

== Other activities ==
In addition to its record-label operations, We Are Busy Bodies has been involved in concert promotion, booking, artist management and international touring. Its North American booking division was established to support artists from different countries and musical backgrounds seeking opportunities to perform in the region.

Founder Eric Warner has also worked in the wider creative industries. His professional biography at Toronto Metropolitan University documents his background in concert promotion, festival management, music marketing and artist management, as well as his role as founder of We Are Busy Bodies.
