= Ryan Downey =

Australian pop musician

- Born: Australia
- Origin: Melbourne, Australia
- Genres: Alternative folk; indie folk
- Occupations: Singer; songwriter
- Years active: 2013–present
- Labels: Gaga Digi (2013-2017); Barely Dressed Records (2018-2020); Dot Dash Records (2021+)
- Website: ryandowney.net

Ryan Downey is an Australian singer and songwriter from Melbourne.

== Early life ==
Ryan Downey grew up in rural Victoria, Australia. At age of 10 he was diagnosed with juvenile arthritis. In 2016, Downey said that "I was a young boy with an old man's body. There were days when I couldn't walk and during the worst of it my hair turned grey for a while. Being a forced bystander through those early years really bound me to my love of art, music and cinema."

== Career ==
=== 2013–2014: Familiar Ground by Venice Music ===
In July 2013, Downey released his debut 4-track EP Familiar Ground under the moniker Venice Music on Gaga Digi. The EP was produced by Casey Rice. In a review of the EP, Stephanie Tell from The Music AU said "Ryan Downey's captivatingly dark, baritone voice immediately strikes you."

=== 2015–2017: Me & Her ===
In 2015, Downey broke his left arm which left him unable to play any instrument for six weeks. During this time, he recorded a "vocals based" EP titled Me & Her which was released on 22 March 2016. The EP contained two originals and songs written and recorded by female songwriters. Downey said "The album was a true joy to make and these songs provided the greatest company, I hope you enjoy them too." The Music AU described the EP as "A jaw-dropping set of gorgeously constructed voice work".

=== 2018–2019: Running ===
On 13 February 2018, The Music Network revealed Downey had signed with Barely Dressed Records and Remote Control Records and released the single "Running". Two further singles were released and on 13 April 2018, Downey released his debut studio album, Running. Australian Independent Record Labels Association described the album as "jaw-droppingly beautiful" and Alastair Cairns from Happy Mag said "Running is his immaculately crafted debut album and it provides the perfect introduction to an artist that has been gathering momentum for some time now." The album was produced by Steve Hassett and recorded across New York and Melbourne, with subject material ranging from humour and pathos, self-analysis and love.

The album made the 2018 Australian Music Prize long list.

=== 2020–present: A Ton of Colours ===
In February 2021, it was announced that Downey had signed with Dot Dash Recordings. Downey said of the signing: "I'm very excited to be joining the Dot Dash fam, their gene pool is outstanding. Not only are they the easiest, most supportive people to work with, they're so incredibly hard working and they believe in the art." To coincide with the announcement, Downey announced his second studio album, A Ton of Colours (stylised as A TON OF COLOURS) and released its lead single "Heart Is an Onion". Downey enlisted producer Burke Reid for this album after hearing the rawness Reid brought to Julia Jacklin's Crushing and Courtney Barnett's Tell Me How You Really Feel albums. Downey said "I'd written these big drama-filled songs that I wanted to be represented vividly and playfully, but balanced with realness in the recordings, which Burke understood immediately." A Ton of Colours was released on 14 May 2021. The album was proceeded by the singles "Heart Is An Onion", "Contact" and "Half Light".

=== Touring ===
Downey has toured nationally, including performances at BIGSOUND, the Melbourne Recital Centre, the Museum of Old and New Art, the St Kilda Festival and headline shows. He has opened for artists including Marlon Williams, Middle Kids, Julia Jacklin, Sarah Blasko and Emma Louise.

== Discography ==
=== Studio albums ===
List of studio albums, with release date and label shown
Title	Details
Running	Released: 13 April 2018; Label: Barely Dressed/Remote Control (BARELY015CD/BARELY015LP); Formats: CD, LP, Digital download, streaming
A Ton of Colours	Released: 14 May 2021; Label: Dot Dash Records (DASH072CD/DASH072LP); Formats: CD, LP, Digital download, streaming

=== Extended plays ===
List of EPs, with release date and label shown
Title	Details
Familiar Ground (as Venice Music)	Released: 26 July 2013; Label: Gaga Digi; Formats: DD
Me & Her	Released: 22 March 2016; Label: Gaga Digi; Formats: DD

=== Singles ===
List of singles, with year released and album name shown
Title	Year	Album
"Tidings"	2015	Me & Her
"Only Time"	2016	Me & Her
"Running"	2018	Running
"Those Eyes That Answer"	2018	Running
"1+1" (featuring Zoë Randell)	2018	Running
"No More Miracles"	2018	non album single
"Heart Is an Onion"	2021	A Ton of Colours
"Contact"	2021	A Ton of Colours
"Half a Light"	2021	A Ton of Colours
"Let Me Love You Like a Woman"	2021	TBA

==== Album appearances ====
List of non-singles, album appearances with year released and album name shown
Title	Year	Album
"Good Time Girl"	2020	Bloom and Simmer (by various artists)
