= Deloris =

Australian indie rock band

- Origin: Melbourne, Victoria, Australia
- Genres: Indie rock
- Years active: 1994–2008
- Labels: Halflight; Quietly Suburban; Dot Dash/Remote Control
- Spinoffs: Single Twin
- Past members: Stuart Charles; Simon Heelis; Marcus Teague; Luke Turley; Leigh Lambert; Daniel Brimelow; Ben Gook; Hugh Counsell; Joe Hammond; Ben Keenan; Tim O'Connor; Anthony Petrucci

Deloris were an Australian indie rock band, which formed in 1994. They released four albums, Fraulein (1999), The Pointless Gift (2000), Fake Our Deaths (2004) and Ten Lives (2006) before disbanding in 2008. Long-term members were Daniel Brimelow on drums, Simon Heelis on bass guitar and guitar, Leigh Lambert on guitar and Marcus Teague on lead vocals, guitar and keyboards. They undertook tours of Australia both headlining and supporting other artists, Something for Kate, Augie March and Delgados. Teague became a solo artist as Single Twin and issued his debut album in 2011.

== History ==
Deloris were formed as an indie rock quartet in Melbourne's outer suburb, Frankston, in 1994 by Stuart Charles on bass guitar, Simon Heelis on guitar, Marcus Teague on lead vocals, guitar and keyboards and Luke Turley on drums. The members had met at secondary school and shared an interest in guitar-based music. The band recorded a four-track demo tape in 1994 at Sandringham Studios, some of that material was released on a various artists' compilation album by the studio. Heelis left and they continued as a trio. Another four tracks were recorded at Backbeach Studios, Rye in 1996.

Deloris played more widely across Melbourne. The trio returned to Backbeach in late 1998 to record material for their debut album, Fraulein, which was released on Perth-based label Halflight Records in April 1999. hEARd's reviewer rated it at 10/10, "[their] music trades between the sounds of grungey pop in similar fashion to Weezer, while simultaneously managing to get their sound close enough to Archer's Of Loaf & perhaps even Pavement... Way cool debut release, can't wait for the follow up."

In 1999 the band flew to Perth and spent two weeks recording and mixing their second album, The Pointless Gift, which was released by Sydney label Quietly Suburban Records in December 2000 and received a glowing critical response, with Melbourne's The Age newspaper giving it four stars, saying "a huge future awaits Deloris". Leigh Lambert joined the band as a second guitarist and Deloris toured Australia supporting Augie March, Something for Kate, Art of Fighting and Purplene as well as for international artists the Mountain Goats and Delgados. They issued a split single with Braving the Seabed and United Kingdom label Scientific Laboratories released The Pointless Gift in that market. Deloris recorded a live set for Triple J radio's Oz Music Show.

In 2001 Turley left the band and, after a brief stint using Something for Kate drummer Clint Hyndman filling in on drums, his replacement was Daniel Brimelow. In 2002 Deloris began assembling material for their third album, Fake Our Deaths, using audio engineer Matt Voigt (Cat Power, the Nation Blue, Augie March, the Dirty Three) and assistant engineer Hugh Counsell (later worked with Race the Fray), to commence recording at Melbourne's Sing Sing studios. The band struggled through a long recording process whenever money and time allowed. The thirteen-track album Fake Our Deaths was completed in late 2003, only months before Quietly Suburban ceased to operate. Without a label, Deloris issued an extended play featuring album tracks "The Unbroke Part of It" and "Playing the Spaces", which were added by Triple J on high rotation.

Deloris were signed by the newly-formed label Dot Dash (an imprint of Remote Control Records) in mid-2004, and Fake Our Deaths was finally released late that year. Throughout the remainder of 2004 and during 2005, the band toured Australia several times. Lambert and Heelis both left at the end of the Fake Our Deaths Tour, leaving Teague and Brimelow to continue as a duo. In 2005 they entered Abercorn studios in Harkaway, to begin work on their fourth album, Ten Lives. After recording basic tracks for half an album, Brimelow left to focus on his family. Teague, the sole remaining band member, continued to write and record instrumentation, drafting in friend Ben Gook on bass guitar and Turley on drums. Ten Lives was issued in 2006 by Dot Dash records. Deloris headlined a tour of Australia as well as supporting Okkervil River using a flexible line-up which variously included Brimelow on drums, Gook on bass guitar, Turley on drums, Hugh Counsell on guitar, Joe Hammond on drums, Ben Keenan on guitar, Tim O'Connor on guitar and Anthony Petrucci on guitar. In late 2007 Deloris comprised Teague, Gook, Hammond and Petrucci. They were the main support on Something for Kate's national tour. In early 2008 the same line-up played their last high-profile show as guests of Brooklyn band the National.

After a handful of more local shows in 2008, Deloris disbanded without an official announcement. In 2009 Teague, Gook and Hammond started writing for a new project and then added in O'Connor. Teague also completed writing his solo project, Single Twin's debut album. In February 2010, although not playing a show in over a year, an official announcement on the Deloris' MySpace page signified their disbandment. Single Twin's debut album Marcus Teague was released in June 2011 and Teague supported it with a tour.

== Discography ==
=== Albums ===
- Fraulein (1999) Halflight Records / MGM
- The Pointless Gift (Quietly Suburban Records / MGM – 2001)
- Fake Our Deaths (Dot Dash – 2004)
- Ten Lives (Dot Dash/Remote Control Records – 2006)

=== Extended plays ===
- Playing the Spaces (independent – 2003)
- Dead Drunks (Remote Control Records/independent – 2004)
- Feather Figure/Elastic Bones (Dot Dash/Independent – 2005)

=== Singles ===
- "Deloris/Braving the Seabed" (Split single — Steady Cam Records – 2002)
