= Take it Sleezy =

Studio album by Dirty Penny
- Released: August 2, 2007
- Recorded: 2006–2007
- Genre: Sleaze metal
- Length: 44:19
- Label: Dirty Penny
- Producer: Johnny Lima

Dirty Penny chronology
| Take it Sleezy (2007) | Young & Reckless (2009) |

Take it Sleezy is the debut album by American Glam Metal band Dirty Penny, released on August 2, 2007. It was produced by music engineer Johnny Lima and was recorded at Suspect Studios, San Jose, California.

== Track listing ==
All tracks written and composed by Ian MacPherson, Matt Biggam, Spencer Joseph, and Tyle Molinaro.

1. "Midnight Ride" – 3:53
2. "Hot and Heavy" – 4:16
3. "Push Comes To Shove" – 3:20
4. "Runnin' Wild" – 2:49
5. "Sleeze Disease" – 3:40
6. "Take a Bite" – 3:18
7. "Black N' Blue" – 4:05
8. "Scream & Shout" – 3:28
9. "Vendetta" – 3:43
10. "No. 1" – 2:50
11. "Rock" – 3:27
12. "Sleeze Disease (Acoustic)" – 5:30

== Music videos ==
There are two music videos from this album. Scream & Shout (2007) and Midnight Ride (2009).
