= Leah Senior =

Australian folk musician

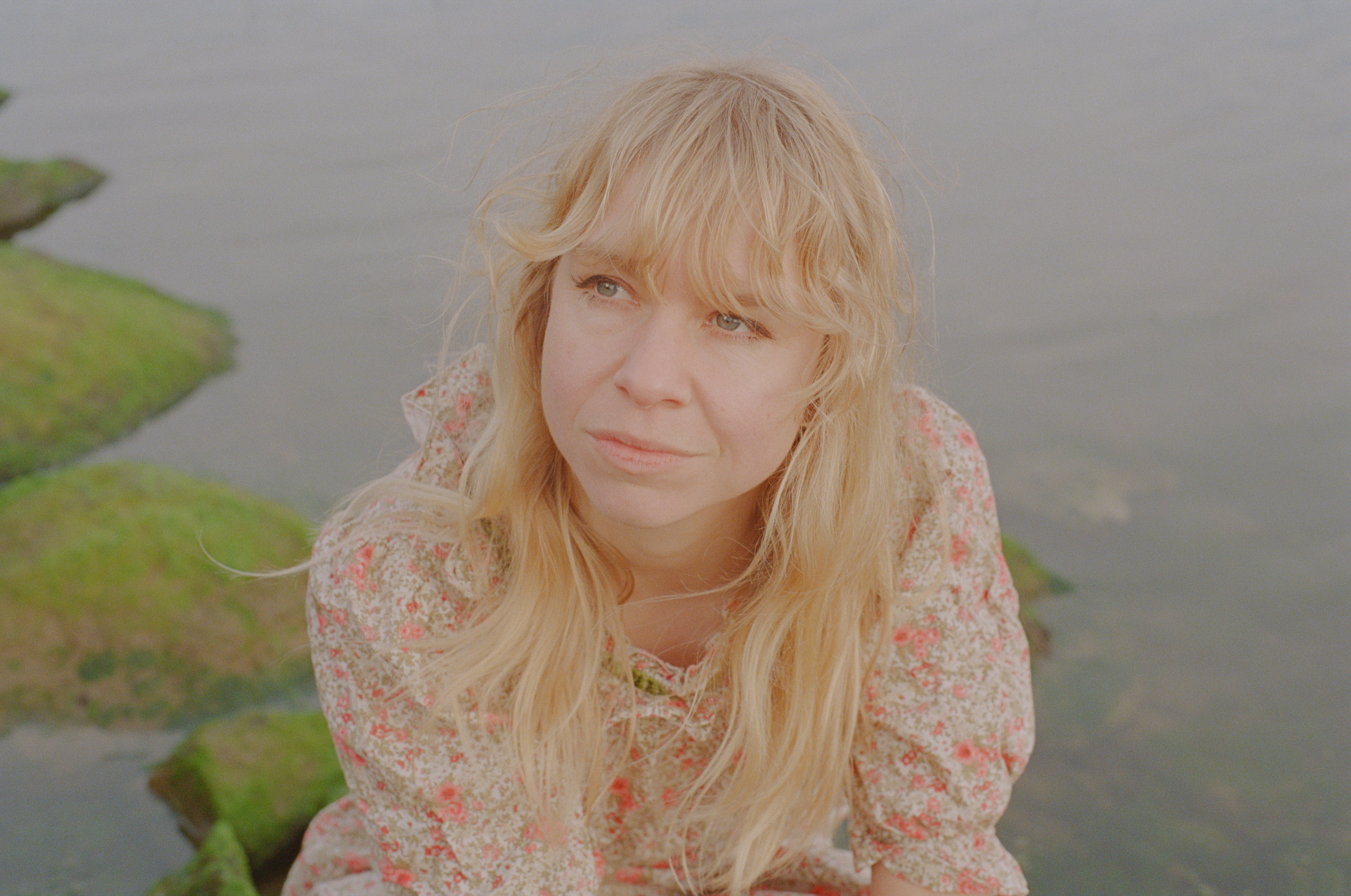
- Leah Senior by Izzie Austin

Background information
- Origin: Woodford, Victoria, Australia
- Genre: Folk
- Occupations: Musician; songwriter; singer
- Instruments: Guitar; piano
- Years active: 2015–present
- Label: Poison City Records
- Member of: Girlatones

Leah Senior is an Australian folk musician.

== Career ==
Leah Senior grew up in Woodford, Victoria, and played classical piano and guitar. She released her first album Summer's on the Ground in 2015 on Flightless Records. It was nominated for Best Folk Roots Album at Music Victoria Awards of 2016.

The album was likened to folk music from the 1960s and 70s, and early Laura Marling, and was built around acoustic guitar and strings. This was followed in 2017 by her album Pretty Faces, featuring a similar folk style, with a full band on the song Black Limousine.

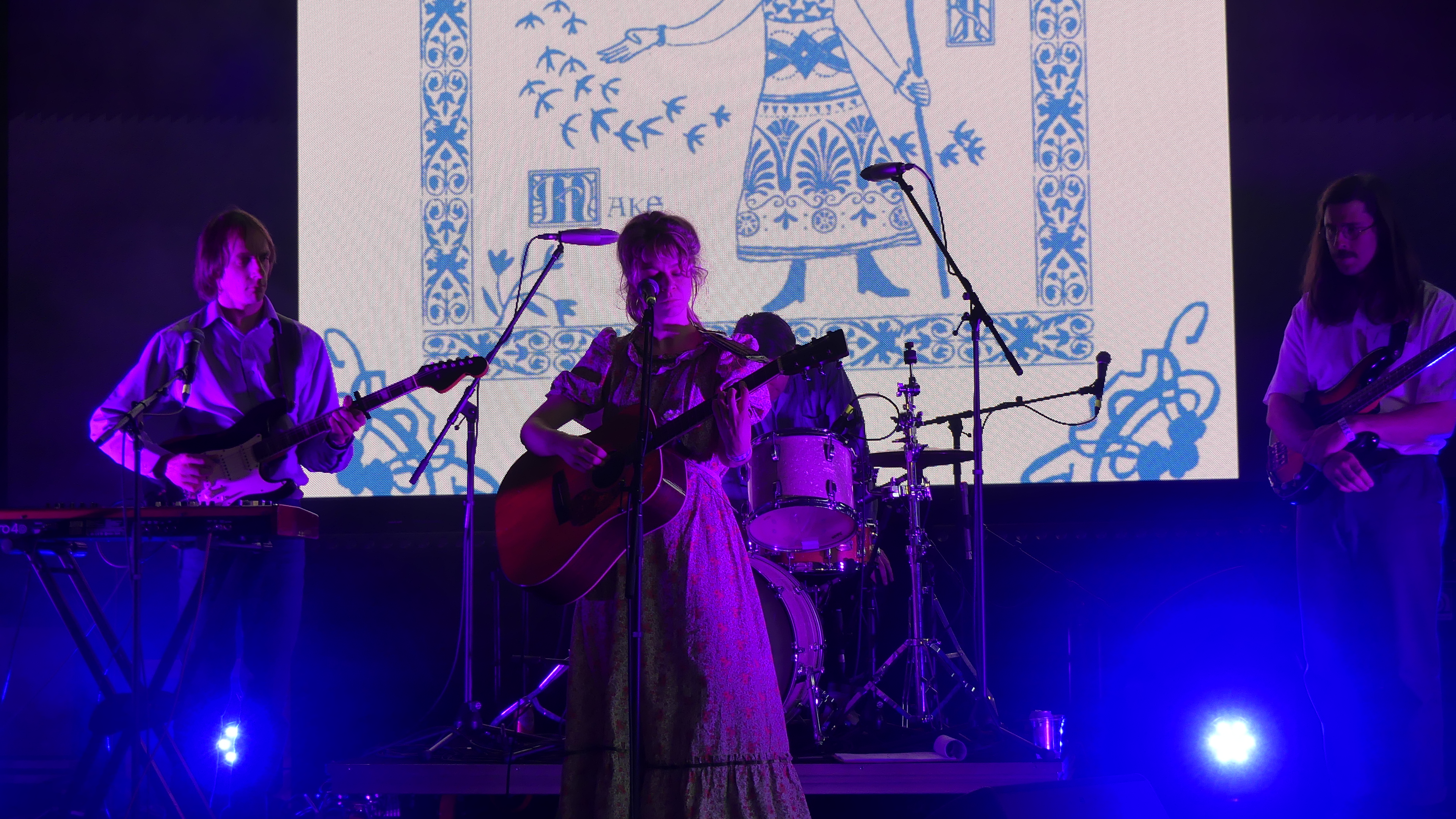
Leah Senior performing at Seasonal Fruits Festival in Brisbane September 2023

During 2017, Senior joined Jesse Williams, Jacob Booty, and Fabian Hunter-Shaw to record an EP as Girlatones. The band recorded a debut album Fitting In Well, with Tam Matlakowski replacing Fabian Hunter-Shaw. This was followed by a second album Horn If You're Honky in 2020 that was described by Rhythms as "a bit more rock'n'roll than the Go-Betweens". It was released by Lost & Lonesome Recording Co. She also collaborated with fellow Australian rock band King Gizzard & the Lizard Wizard to provide narration on their 2017 studio albums Murder of the Universe and Polygondwanaland. She has since joined the band on stage multiple times to perform her parts in a live setting, with notable appearances at the band's 2022 Red Rocks shows.

2020 also saw the release of Senior's third solo album The Passing Scene, with a lenticular album cover created by Jamie Wdziekonski. Senior wrote the album on piano before working on the songs further with her band, made up of Luke Brennan, Tam Matlakowski, Jesse Williams, and her sister Andi Senior. The Passing Scene was recorded at her home in Preston, and was described as being more of "a baroque pop vein", different from the melancholic folk her early albums were known for.

In May 2023, Senior announced her next album The Music That I Make would be released in August on Poison City Records. She narrated "Dawn of Eternal Night", the bonus song of the album PetroDragonic Apocalypse by King Gizzard & the Lizard Wizard released in June 2023.

In July 2025, Senior removed her music from Spotify, citing the company's low payout for artists, and CEO Daniel Ek's involvement with the AI weapons development company Helsing. Senior's fifth album, Pt. Roadknight, was released in June 2026 on Third Eye Stimuli Records and Spinster Records.

== Discography ==
=== Albums ===
List of albums, with selected details
Title	Details	Peak chart positions
Title	Details	AUS
Summer's on the Ground	Released: November 2015; Label: Flightless (FLT-019); Format: CD, digital	—
Pretty Faces	Released: 2017; Label: Flightless (FLT-030); Format: CD, digital, LP	—
The Passing Scene	Released: 2020; Label: Flightless (FLT-059); Format: digital, LP	58
The Music That I Make	Released: 2023; Label: Poison City Records (PCR193); Format: CD, digital, LP	—
Pt. Roadknight	Released: 19 June 2026; Label: Third Eye Stimuli (TES047); Format: CD, digital, LP	42

== Awards and nominations ==
=== AIR Awards ===
The Australian Independent Record Awards (commonly known informally as AIR Awards) is an annual awards night to recognise, promote and celebrate the success of Australia's Independent Music sector.

Year	Nominee / work	Award	Result	Ref.
2024	The Music That I Make	Best Independent Blues and Roots Album or EP	Nominated	

=== Music Victoria Awards ===
The Music Victoria Awards are an annual awards night celebrating music from the Australian state of Victoria.

Year	Nominee / work	Award	Result	Ref.
2016	Summer's On the Ground	Best Folk Roots Album	Nominated	
2017	Pretty Faces	Best Folk Roots Album	Nominated	
2020	"Evergreen"	Best Victorian Song	Nominated	
2020	Leah Senior	Best Solo Artist	Nominated	
2023	Leah Senior	Best Regional Act	Nominated	
2023	Leah Senior	Best Folk Work	Nominated	
2024	Leah Senior	Best Regional Act	Won	
