= Sunfruits =

Australian psychedelic pop band

- Origin: Melbourne, Australia
- Genres: Psychedelic pop
- Years active: 2018-present
- Labels: Third Eye Stimuli (AU); Earth Libraries (US)
- Members: Winter McQuinn (guitar, vocals); Evie Vlah (guitar, vocals); Eugene Argiro (drums, vocals); Elena Jones (bass, vocals)
- Past members: Acacia Coates; Shelby De Fazio
- Website: http://sunfruitsband.com

Sunfruits is an Australian psychedelic pop band formed by Winter McQuinn. They released their debut album One Degree in April 2023.

== History ==
In 2020, the group released their debut EP, Certified Organic.

In 2021, Sunfruits recorded songs for their debut album. In August 2022, the band released the first single from the album, "Made to Love."

In November 2022, the band released the single "Believe it All".

In March 2023, they released a new single, "End of the World" and announced the forthcoming release of their debut album, One Degree.

In April 2023, they released their debut album One Degree, which reached 19 on the Australian Independent Record independent label charts in its first week of release The album was released by Third Eye Stimuli Records, Australia and Earth Libraries, US.

NME included the album in top ten picks for April 2023, with Alex Gallagher writing: "This psych-pop group‘s debut album manages to be at once kaleidoscopic and exuberant – the kind of euphoric ear candy that hits one’s brain like a sudden dopamine rush. The twist to all that deceptively effervescent, blissed-out fuzz is it’s a kind of Trojan horse for the band to grapple with bigger matters, confronting environmental collapse and the weight of trying to be a good, empathetic person while navigating the hellscape."

In Shindig Magazine (UK) Camila Asia gave the album 4 stars. In Pilerats Conor Herbert wrote: "herein lies the beauty of Sunfruits’ One Degree — while it grapples with catastrophe, it finds solace in community, pulling hope from existential despair and linking arms as we stare down a potentially untimely end. It's when things seem desperate and hopeless that resolve and hope are most needed, and in their tales of love, loss, and armageddon, there's a shoulder to lean on and a tempo to move to."

The Underground Stage Australia noted Better off Dead by Sunfruits as the Story of the week in April 2023, up against much more established artists.

In August–September 2023 Sunfruits toured EU/UK for the first time, with 22 shows in 10 countries, including appearances at leading festivals Manchester Psych Festival, Leffingeleuren Festival (BEL) and Misty Fields Festival (NL).

== Discography ==
Title	Details
One Degree (LP)	Released April 28, 2023; Format LP, digital; Label Third Eye Stimuli Records (AUS) Earth Libraries (US)
Certified Organic (EP)	Released February 11, 2020; Format LP, digital; Label Third Eye Stimuli Records (AUS)

== Awards ==
In April 2023, Sunfruits were announced as finalists for the Environmental Music Prize with their song, "End of the World" Their song lyrics were read in the Australian Parliament by Greens Senator Janet Rice, as part of a call to action on climate policy, and they were featured artists on the leading climate change podcast, Outrage and Optimism hosted by former United Nations climate change official Christiana Figueres and the team who developed the Paris Agreement.
