= Gena Rose Bruce =

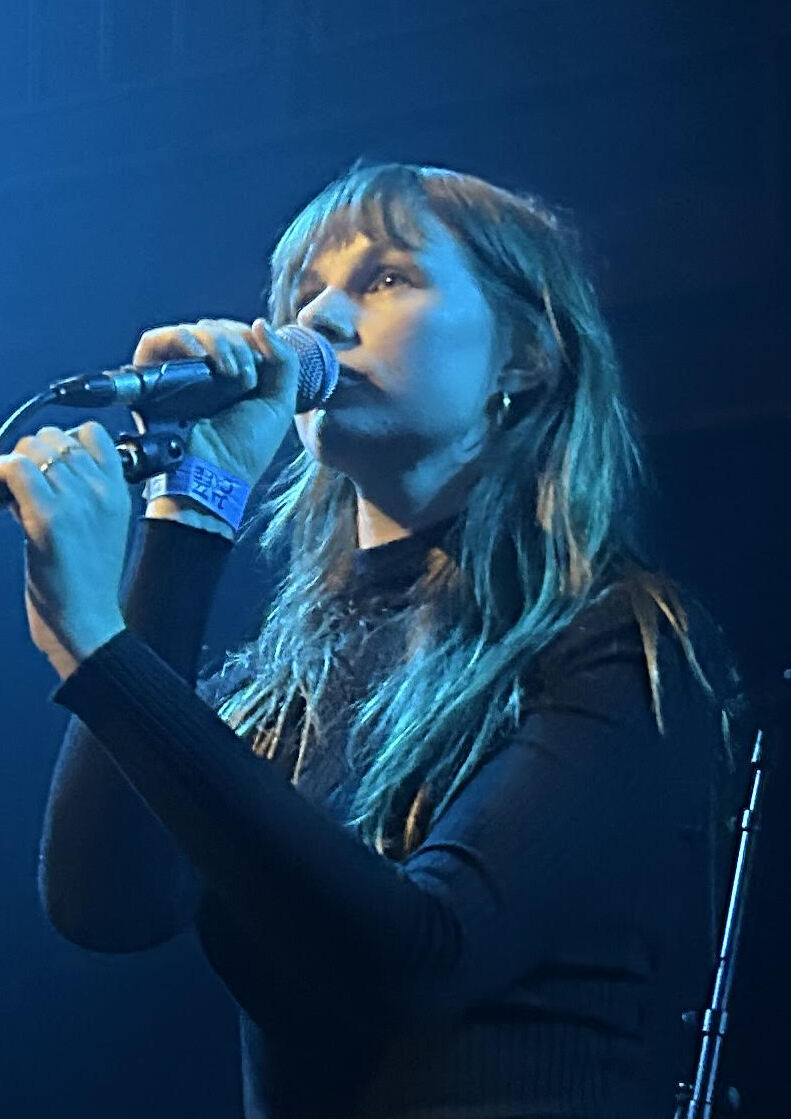
- Gena Rose Bruce performing at the Jazz Cafe, in London

Background information
- Born: 1993 (age 32–33); Mitcham, Victoria, Australia
- Origin: Melbourne, Australia
- Genres: indie folk, alternative country
- Occupations: Singer; songwriter; musician
- Instruments: Vocals; guitar
- Years active: 2013–present
- Label: Dot Dash Recordings
- Website: https://www.genarosebruce.com/

Gena Rose Bruce is an Australian singer-songwriter based in Melbourne.

== Career ==
In 2013, Rose competed in the Telstra Road to Discovery competition at the Tamworth Country Music Festival, and won the performer category. In 2016, she released the EP Mad Love and joined Ella Hooper on the Calamine Sisters tour in support of their respective new releases. In 2018, she released the singles "The Way You Make Love" and "Coming Down", and in 2019 she released the single "Angel Face" and her corresponding debut album Can't Make You Love Me.

In 2022, Rose released the singles "Foolishly in Love" and "Deep Is the Way", both collaborations with Bill Callahan. In 2023, she released her second album, Deep Is the Way, to positive reviews.

== Discography ==
=== Studio albums ===
List of studio albums, with selected details about release date and label
Title	Details
Can't Make You Love Me	Released: 28 June 2019; Label: Dot Dash Recordings (DASH056); Format: CD, LP, digital
Deep Is the Way	Released: 27 January 2023; Label: Dot Dash Recordings (DASH079); Format: CD, LP, digital

=== Extended Plays ===
List of EPs, with selected details about release date and label
Title	Details
Wild One Babe	Released: 2013; Label: Gena Bruce Music (GRB2013); Format: CD, digital
Mad Love	Released: 2015; Label: Gena Bruce Music (148029.1); Format: CD, digital

== Awards and nominations ==
=== Music Victoria Awards ===
The Music Victoria Awards are an annual awards night celebrating Victorian music. They commenced in 2006.

Year	Nominee / work	Award	Result	Ref.
2023	Gena Rose Bruce	Best Solo Artist	Nominated	
