= Young & Reckless =

Studio album by Dirty Penny
- Released: September 17, 2009
- Recorded: Suspect Studios, 2008-2009
- Genre: Sleaze Metal
- Length: 45:31
- Label: Dirty Penny
- Producer: Johnny Lima

Dirty Penny chronology
Take it Sleezy (2007)	Young & Reckless (2009)

Young & Reckless is Dirty Penny's second and final album, released on September 17, 2009. It was produced by Johnny Lima, and recorded at Suspect Studios in San Jose, California.

== Track listing ==
All tracks written and composed by Ian MacPherson, Matt Biggam, Spencer Joseph, and Tyle Molinaro.

1. "If I Were You I'd Hate Me Too" – 3:27
2. "In Luv with Insanity" – 3:01
3. "LCS" – 3:01
4. "On My Sleeve" – 3:35
5. "Goin' Out in Style" – 3:34
6. "Stand on My Own" – 3:36
7. "Sleeping Dogs" – 3:27
8. "Devil in Me" – 3:23
9. "Dead at 16" – 3:38
10. "Livin' Rock" – 3:20
11. "Run to You" – 4:26
12. "Crash and Burn" – 3:17
13. "Wrecking Ball" – 3:46
