= Young and Restless (Australian band) =

- Origin: Canberra, Australian Capital Territory, Australia
- Genres: Post-hardcore
- Years active: 2005–2009
- Label: Dot Dash Recordings
- Past members: Karina Utomo; Ross Paxman; Nugroho "Nugie" Utomo; Ash Pegram; Mark Falkland; Josh Weller
- Website: http://www.youngandrestless.org

Young and Restless (sometimes abbreviated to Y + R or Y & R) were a band from Canberra, Australia.

== Biography ==
Young and Restless were formed in 2005, and won the 2006 Triple J Unearthed competition to play at the Homebake Festival 2006. The band formed in early 2005 when Karina Utomo and Ash Pegram (who were old high school buddies) combined with Ross Paxman, Mark Falkland and Nugie Utomo. Early names of the band were '...Wolves' and then 'The I Hate Yous' before settling on the current name. They started playing shows in Canberra before slowly playing interstate shows. They recorded initial demos in Canberra before recording their first single "Satan" with Christopher Colonna from past Unearthed winners The Bumblebeez. The track was given to James Ford from Simian Mobile Disco to mix and master and the result was sent off to radio, blogs and industry people. Triple J quickly caught on to the single, giving it considerable airplay.

Split-based between Canberra and Melbourne since 2007, they have played with the likes of The Mint Chicks, Erase Errata, Suicide Girls, Die! Die! Die! and Cansei de Ser Sexy.

It was announced in August 2007 that founding members Mark Falkland and Ash Pegram would be leaving the band.

In November 2007, the band took the QANTAS Spirit of Youth Award in the music category, the prize included a mentorship with legendary music producer Nick Launay. Other finalists in the category included Mercy Arms and Bridezilla.

In December 2007 the band were announced as winners of the inaugural 2007 Unearthed J Award.

In 2008, Josh Weller was announced as the new guitarist.

On 17 August 2009, the band posted a blog on their MySpace stating that the band would be breaking up. Young And Restless played their final show on 21 August at the Arthouse in Melbourne.

Karina Utomo and Ash Pegram are now in High Tension, a new outfit also featuring members of The Nation Blue.

=== Debut album ===
The band's debut album, Young and Restless, was released on 14 July 2007 through Dot Dash Recordings, produced by Tom Larkin of New Zealand band Shihad.

When it came time to recording their album, a few notable producers were interested including Dean Turner of Magic Dirt, Phil McKellar and Pelle Henricson of Refused fame. Tom Larkin was chosen purely on his understanding of the band's influences (which include Hot Snakes, Suicide and Sleater-Kinney). The album was done over a period of 6 months in Larkin's studio in Brunswick. The drum and bass tracks of all songs were recorded straight onto tape reels to give them warmth and depth. Peter Saladino of Canberra band Brisk was brought it on assist on "My Knives" and Tom Lyncolgn of Nation Blue was also enlisted with "Testestrogen". The album was partly mixed by Magoo and partly by Larkin in the studio. The meaning of the songs is unknown with a few exceptions. "Satan" has been seen as a pisstake on the two genres in alternative music that were popular at the time - hardcore and dance. "I Pointed at You and You Burst into Flames" recalls a conversation Karina overheard where a woman yelled at two foreigners for speaking another language other than English.

=== Break up ===
They announced their breakup on their Myspace page on 17 August 2009, a few weeks after the release of their single "Creeps".

== Former members ==
- Karina Utomo - vocals (2005–2009)
- Ross Paxman - bass (2005–2009)
- Nugroho "Nugie" Utomo - drums, percussion (2005–2009)
- Ash Pegram - guitars, keyboards (2005–2007)
- Mark Falkland - guitars, vocals (2005–2007)
- Josh Weller - guitar (2007–2009)

== Discography ==
=== Studio albums ===
Album information
Young and Restless
- Release date: 14 July 2007
- Label: Dot Dash

=== Singles ===
Year	Title	Album
2006	"Satan"	Young and Restless
2007	"Kapow!"	Young and Restless
2007	"Police Police"	Young and Restless

=== Music videos ===
Year	Video title	Director
2006	"Satan"	Thomas Fitzgerald / BITER
2007	"Police Police"	Rhett Wade-Ferrel / MOOPJAW

== Awards ==
=== J Award ===
The J Awards are an annual series of Australian music awards that were established by the Australian Broadcasting Corporation's youth-focused radio station Triple J. They commenced in 2005.

Year	Nominee / work	Award	Result
J Awards of 2007	themselves	Unearthed Artist of the Year	Won
