= Gwenifer Raymond =

Welsh musician

Gwenifer Raymond is a Welsh guitarist, composer and multi-instrumentalist based in Brighton, England. She is associated with the American primitive guitar tradition, a style of instrumental acoustic music characterised by intricate fingerpicking and influences from blues, folk and other musical traditions. Her compositions incorporate elements of pre-war American blues, Appalachian music, Welsh folklore and experimental music.

== Early life and education ==
Raymond grew up in South Wales. She began playing guitar at approximately eight or nine years old after hearing Nirvana's 1991 album Nevermind, which prompted her to ask for a guitar. During her adolescence, Raymond played guitar and drums in punk and rock bands. Her early musical influences included alternative rock groups and musicians, before she developed an interest in American blues and acoustic folk music. Raymond studied astrophysics at Cardiff University, where she completed a Doctor of Philosophy in 2011. Her doctoral thesis was titled Limitations and Advances in the Field of Far-Infrared/Submillimetre Extragalactic Astronomy, or The Trouble With Terahertz. Following her doctorate, Raymond worked as a programmer in the video-game industry while developing her musical career. She has discussed her academic background and continuing interests in astronomy and science fiction in interviews.

== Musical career ==
=== 2018–2019: You Never Were Much of a Dancer ===
Raymond released her debut studio album, You Never Were Much of a Dancer, on 29 June 2018 through the independent record label Tompkins Square Records. The album established her association with the American primitive guitar tradition, drawing on acoustic blues, Appalachian music and the instrumental guitar compositions of John Fahey. It received positive reviews from music critics, with particular attention given to Raymond's intricate fingerpicking and distinctive approach to instrumental acoustic music. In March 2019, Raymond discussed her musical beginnings, early influences and work as a video-game programmer in an interview with Guitar.com.

=== 2020–2024: Strange Lights Over Garth Mountain ===
Raymond released her second studio album, Strange Lights Over Garth Mountain, on 13 November 2020 through Tompkins Square Records. The album drew inspiration from Raymond's Welsh upbringing and the landscape surrounding Garth Mountain in Wales. It developed her earlier American primitive influences into a more experimental musical approach, incorporating elements of Welsh folklore and folk horror. Raymond discussed the development of her musical style and the influence of Celtic mythology and folk horror in a July 2021 interview with Guitar Player. In a September 2021 interview with ON: Yorkshire Magazine, she discussed the album's recording process and its relationship with her Welsh background and musical development.

=== 2025–present: Last Night I Heard the Dog Star Bark ===
Raymond announced her third studio album, Last Night I Heard the Dog Star Bark, in June 2025. The album was released on 5 September 2025 through We Are Busy Bodies. The album incorporated themes associated with astronomy, science fiction, mythology, occultism and experimental music. Its lead single, "Jack Parsons Blues", was inspired by the American rocket scientist and occultist Jack Parsons. In September 2025, The Quietus published a review discussing the album's instrumental arrangements and musical development. The Financial Times also reviewed the album, discussing its combination of occult and folkloric themes with Raymond's instrumental guitar compositions. In an interview with The Line of Best Fit in 2025, Raymond discussed the relationship between her astrophysics background, science-fiction interests and the themes explored in the album.

== Musical style ==
Raymond's music is associated with the American primitive guitar tradition, particularly the instrumental fingerstyle approach developed and popularised by American guitarist John Fahey. Her compositions feature intricate fingerpicking, unconventional tunings, rhythmic complexity and influences from American blues and folk music. Her musical influences include John Fahey and early American blues and Appalachian musicians. Her compositions also incorporate elements of Welsh folklore, folk horror and experimental music. Raymond has used the term "Welsh Primitive" to describe her musical approach, combining the American primitive guitar tradition with influences from her Welsh upbringing and the surrounding landscape.

== Discography ==
- You Never Were Much of a Dancer 29 June 2018 Tompkins Square Records
- Strange Lights Over Garth Mountain 13 November 2020 Tompkins Square Records
- Last Night I Heard the Dog Star Bark 5 September 2025 We Are Busy Bodies }

== Tours ==
In 2026, Raymond undertook an extensive international touring schedule, performing at festivals and venues across Europe, North America and Australia. Her festival appearances included Shake The High Road Festival, Focus Wales, Primavera a la Ciutat, Roskilde Festival, Mariposa Folk Festival, Ottawa Bluesfest and Hillside Festival. In August, she performed four Australian dates in Sydney, Brisbane, Melbourne and Adelaide. In October, Raymond appeared as a supporting artist on selected North American dates with The Tallest Man on Earth, before joining Geese as a supporting act on their Getting Killed Again Tour, with performances in the United States and Canada during November. Further solo performances were scheduled across Europe in November and December, including dates in Finland, Sweden, Denmark, Norway, France, Spain, Portugal and the United Kingdom.
