= Fur (band) =

English indie rock band

- Origin: Brighton, England
- Genres: Indie rock; psychedelic pop; dream pop; doo-wop
- Years active: 2015–present
- Labels: 777 MUSIC, Nice Swan Records
- Members: Will Murray; Will "Tav" Tavener; Flynn Whelan
- Past members: Harry "Zwaig" Saunders; Josh Buchanan
- Website: furband.co.uk

Fur (stylised as FUR) are an English indie rock band based in Brighton, England. The band was formed by lead singer and guitarist Will Murray, former guitarist Harry Saunders, bassist Will Tavener, and drummer Flynn Whelan. The members met when they attended BIMM Institute in 2015. Saunders left the band in 2019. He was then replaced by guitarist and keyboard player Josh Buchanan, who shared the writing duties with Murray until his departure in 2023. They are currently signed to Boy Pablo's independent label, 777 MUSIC.

The band is known for their unique mixture of a 1950s and 1960s-inspired style with a current modern sound. Their 2017 hit single "If You Know that I'm Lonely" has garnered 36 million views on YouTube as of June 2023, gaining significant portions mostly from Southeast Asia and South America, especially Indonesia, Peru, and Brazil. In November 2021, they released their debut album and their first ever release under 777 MUSIC, When You Walk Away. The album was met with positive reviews, highlighting on the band's craftsmanship in fusing contemporary and traditional rock as well as touching relevant subject to their listeners which the band described as "the individual's post-coming-of-age era."

In June 2023, the band announced an "extended hiatus" following the last shows and music for the foreseeable future.

== Members ==
=== Current ===
- Will Murray - vocals, guitar (2015–present)
- Will "Tav" Tavener - bass, backing vocals (2015–present)
- Flynn Whelan - drums (2015–present)

=== Former ===
- Harry "Zwaig" Saunders - guitar, backing vocals (2015–2019)
- Josh Buchanan - guitar, keyboards, backing vocals (2019–2023)

== Discography ==
=== Studio albums ===
Title	Details
When You Walk Away	Released: 5 November 2021; Label: 777 MUSIC; Format: LP, CD, digital download

=== Mixtapes ===
Title	Details
Facing Home Mixtape	Released: 31 July 2020; Label: Self-released; Format: cassette, digital download

=== EPs ===
Title	Details
FUR	Released: 14 February 2019; Label: Nice Swan Records; Format: LP, digital download
Oldies & Goldies	Released: 26 August 2022; Label: 777 MUSIC; Format: Digital download
