= Third Eye Stimuli Records =

Australian independent record label

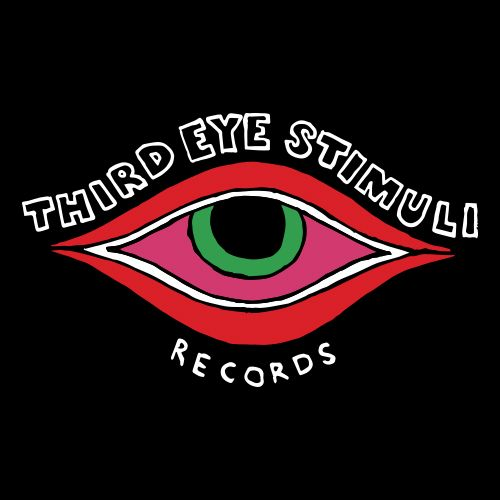

Third Eye Stimuli Records is an Australian independent record label based in Thirroul, NSW founded in 2015 by Joshua White and Rick Snowden.

In 2020, the label curated a performance series called Strange News in NSW and Victoria.

Third Eye Stimuli Records curates ongoing tours in Australia and New Zealand. Artists with this label have had albums in the Rolling Stone Album of the Year in Australia and New Zealand in 2024.

| Third Eye Stimuli Records | |
| Founded | 2016 |
| Genre | Psychedelic rock, psychedelic folk |
| Country of Origin | Australia |
| Official website | https://www.thirdeyestimuli.com/ |

== Artists released by Third Eye Stimuli Records ==
=== Current roster ===
- Arbes
- Chet Sounds
- The Flamingo Jones
- Gimmy
- The Grease Arrestor
- Hot Apple Band
- Joe Ghatt
- Laure Briard
- The Laurels
- Leah Senior
- Luke Spook
- Melodrones
- The Oogars
- Peel
- Rosamaria
- Stephen Bailey
- Sunfruits
- The Uplifting Bell Ends
- Winter McQuinn
- Za.Noon

== See also ==
List of record labels
