= Sunbeam Sound Machine =

- Also known as: Sunbeam Sound Machine
- Born: Nick Sowersby
- Origin: Melbourne, Australia
- Genres: Psychedelic rock, psychedelic pop, indie rock, dream pop, neo-psychedelia
- Occupation: Musician
- Instruments: Vocals; guitar; bass; keyboards; drums
- Years active: 2013–present
- Label: Dot Dash

Nick Sowersby, known professionally as Sunbeam Sound Machine is an Australian multi-instrumentalist musician.

== Biography ==
Sunbeam Sound Machine first garnered attention with the 2013 EPs One and Sunbeam Sound Machine. A video for "Cosmic Love Affair" was released in December 2013.

In November 2014, the debut studio album Wonderer received widespread acclaim, leading to nationwide touring in Australia, followed by a tour of the US with Sowersby's five-piece live outfit.

In February 2019, Sunbeam Sound Machine released "Talking Distance", the lead single from the second studio album. In May 2019, Sunbeam Sound Machine released Goodness Gracious which Sowersby described as "a bit more of a moody album" [than Wonderer]. Sowersby said "I began working on this album in an exploratory way, recording for recording's sake until an album began to naturally take form. Along the way, I found some sounds that it feels like I've been hearing in my head for years. The result is 11 songs that document a period of change, about what we look to for guidance, comfort, and stability in uncertain times". The album debuted at number 97 on the ARIA Charts.

== Discography ==
=== Albums ===
List of studio albums, with selected chart positions
Title	Album details	Peak chart positions
Title	Album details	AUS
Wonderer	Released: 21 November 2014; Label: Dot Dash (DASH028); Format: LP, CD, digital download	-
Goodness Gracious	Released: 3 May 2019; Label: Dot Dash (DASH052); Format: LP, CD, digital download, streaming	97
Possum	Released: 7 October 2022; Label: Dot Dash; Format: Digital download, streaming & LP (Limited edition)	-
Double Magic	Released: 15 August 2025	-

=== Extended plays ===
List of Extended Plays
Title	EP details
One	Released: 29 November 2013; Label: Dot Dash; Format: digital download
Sunbeam Sound Machine	Released: 29 November 2013; Label: Dot Dash; Format: digital download
