= Remote Control Records =

Australian record label

- Founded: 2001
- Founder: Steve Cross; Harvey Saward
- Genre: Various
- Country of origin: Australia
- Location: Melbourne
- Official website: Remote Control Records

Remote Control Records was established in 2001 by Steve Cross and Harvey Saward. It provides publicity, label management, distribution and marketing services to international and local artists and labels.

Remote Control's roster of international artists includes Adele, Queens of the Stone Age, The xx, FKA Twigs, Jungle, Vampire Weekend, Alabama Shakes, Radiohead, the National, Purity Ring and SBTRKT. The company represents various international record labels in the Australian and New Zealand markets, including 4AD, Matador Records, Rough Trade, True Panther, XL Recordings, and Young Turks. By October 2009 Andrew McMillen of Mess+Noise felt, "[it] represents a substantial roster of international artists in Australia and New Zealand."

In 2004 Remote Control established Dot Dash Recordings with Inertia Distribution, exclusively for Australian acts. The Dot Dash roster includes Pearls, Teeth & Tongue, Client Liaison, Sunbeam Sound Machine, Total Giovanni, Dorsal Fins, Saskwatch, Jeremy Neale, Methyl Ethel, and Velociraptor.

Remote Control also works in partnership with a number of independent Australian and New Zealand labels, including Milk!, Flightless and Barely Dressed, providing support to such artists as Courtney Barnett, King Gizzard & the Lizard Wizard, Fat Freddy's Drop, Babe Rainbow, Kllo, and Banoffee.

In 2013 Remote Control opened a new publicity and promotions department via Recon Music, an established, boutique PR agency specialising in strategic national media campaigns. Recon's list of past and present clients included Sharon Van Etten, Ty Segall, Josh Pyke, The Clean, Elizabeth Rose, Allday, DZ Deathrays, Say Lou Lou, Loon Lake, Sally Seltmann, Sugar Mountain Festival, Saskwatch and Philadelphia Grand Jury.

The label celebrated its 15th birthday in June 2016 by a party with, "a wide range of dope beat pushers, from Jim Lawrie at the start to Teeth & Tongue in the middle to Milwaukee Banks at the end."

theMusic.com.au's reviewers described the company in February 2018, "one of the country’s leading record labels." They observed, "they’ve opened up a completely different avenue of upcoming talent and assisted in building strong communities within the local scene" and determined that, "2017 saw the label have its strongest and most consistent year ever on the ARIA Album Chart."

== Representation ==
=== Labels ===
- Beggars Group
  - 4AD
  - Matador Records
  - Rough Trade
  - True Panther
  - XL Recordings
  - Young Turks
  - Dot Dash Recordings
  - Flightless
  - Barely Dressed Records
- Omnian Music Group
  - 2MR
  - Body Double Ltd
  - Captured Tracks
  - Couple Skate
  - Fantasy Memory
  - Honor Press
  - Manufactured Recordings
  - Sinderlyn
  - Squirrel Thing

=== International acts ===
- AC Newman
- Adam Green
- Adele
- Alabama Shakes
- Alexander
- Algiers
- Atlas Sound
- Atoms For Peace
- BeeGeeDee
- Belle & Sebastian
- Basement Jaxx
- Bauhaus
- Beirut
- Benjamin Booker
- The Big Pink
- Blonde Redhead
- Body/Head
- Boulevards
- The Breeders
- British Sea Power
- Ceremony
- Camera Obscura
- Cat Power
- Civil Civic
- The Cave Singers
- The Cocteau Twins
- The Creases
- The Cult
- Daughter
- Delorean
- Deerhunter
- DIIV
- Dillinger Escape Plan
- East India Youth
- Efterklang
- Eddi Reader
- EMA
- Emiliana Torrini
- Elvis Perkins
- Esben & the Witch
- Eyedress
- Fat Freddy's Drop
- FKA Twigs
- Francoiz Breut
- Friendly Fires
- Fucked Up
- Future Islands
- Future of the Left
- Gang Gang Dance
- Giggs
- Glasser
- Grayson Gilmour
- Guerre
- Holy Fuck
- The Horrors
- Houndmouth
- Iceage
- Inc
- Indians
- Holly Herndon
- Howler
- Ibeyi
- Iron & Wine
- Jamie xx
- Jane Badler
- Jeffrey Lewis
- Jenny Lewis
- Jungle
- Kelly Dance
- King Krule
- Kirin J Callinan
- Kurt Vile
- Lapsley
- Lee Ranaldo & the Dust
- Le1f
- Lo Fang
- Love Migrate
- Lower
- Lucianblomkamp
- Majical Cloudz
- Merchandise
- Micachu
- Mike Turner
- The Mountain Goats
- The National
- Ned Collette
- New Gods
- The New Pornographers
- Palma Violets
- Panthu Du Prince
- Parquet Courts
- Pavement
- Paul Banks
- Peaches
- Pixies
- Prodigy
- Purity Ring
- QT
- Queens of the Stone Age
- Radiohead
- Ratking
- Ratatat
- SOAK
- Sagamore
- Sampha
- Savages
- SBTRKT
- Scott Walker
- Shamir
- SHLOHMO
- Sigur Ros
- SOAK
- Sohn
- Sonic Youth
- St. Vincent
- Stereolab
- Stornoway
- Super Wild Horses
- T54
- Thom Yorke
- Thurston Moore
- Tindersticks
- Tobias Jesso Jr.
- Tune-Yards
- Twin Shadow
- Vampire Weekend
- Velociraptor
- Warpaint
- Wild Nothing
- The White Stripes
- Willis Earl Beal
- Woods
- Yo La Tengo
- The xx
- Zomby

=== Australian acts ===
- Banoffee
- Client Liaison
- Courtney Barnett
- Dirty Three
- Dorsal Fins
- Jess Ribeiro
- Jim Lawrie
- King Gizzard & the Lizard Wizard
- Leah Senior
- Love Migrate
- Miami Horror
- Milwaukee Banks
- Methyl Ethel
- The Murlocs
- Oh Pep!
- Pearls
- Pipe-Eye
- Saskwatch
- Sui Zhen
- Sunbeam Sound Machine
- Teeth & Tongue
- Velociraptor

== See also ==
- Lists of record labels
