= Dot Dash Recordings =

- Founded: 2004
- Founder: Remote Control Records
- Distributor: Inertia Distribution
- Genre: Various
- Location: North Melbourne, Victoria, Australia
- Official website: Dot Dash Recordings

Dot Dash Recordings is a collaboration between the two companies - Remote Control Records, which provides publicity, marketing and label management while Inertia Distribution looks after distribution and sales. Dot Dash Recordings was set up by Remote Control Records in mid-2004 as a new label for Australian artists.

The label works exclusively with Australian artists, including Methyl Ethel, Client Liaison, Gabriella Cohen, Donny Benet and many more. Previous label artists include Wolf & Cub, Ned Collette, New Buffalo, Deloris, Snowman, St. Helens, Fire! Santa Rosa, Fire!, Cloud Control and Young and Restless.

== Artists ==
- Stella Donnelly
- Methyl Ethel
- Client Liaison
- Donny Benét
- Ryan Downey
- Gabriella Cohen
- Jeremy Neale
- Teeth & Tongue
- Jess Cornelius
- Sui Zhen
- Banoffee
- Total Giovanni
- Milwaukee Banks
- Dorsal Fins
- friendships
- Katz
- HANDSOME
- Sunbeam Sound Machine
- Lost Animal
- Velociraptor
- Gena Rose Bruce

=== Past artists ===
- Nightstick
- Young and Restless
- Wolf & Cub
- Ned Collette
- New Buffalo
- Deloris
- Snowman
- St. Helens
- Fire! Santa Rosa, Fire!
- Cloud Control

== See also ==
- List of record labels
