= Vera Blue discography =

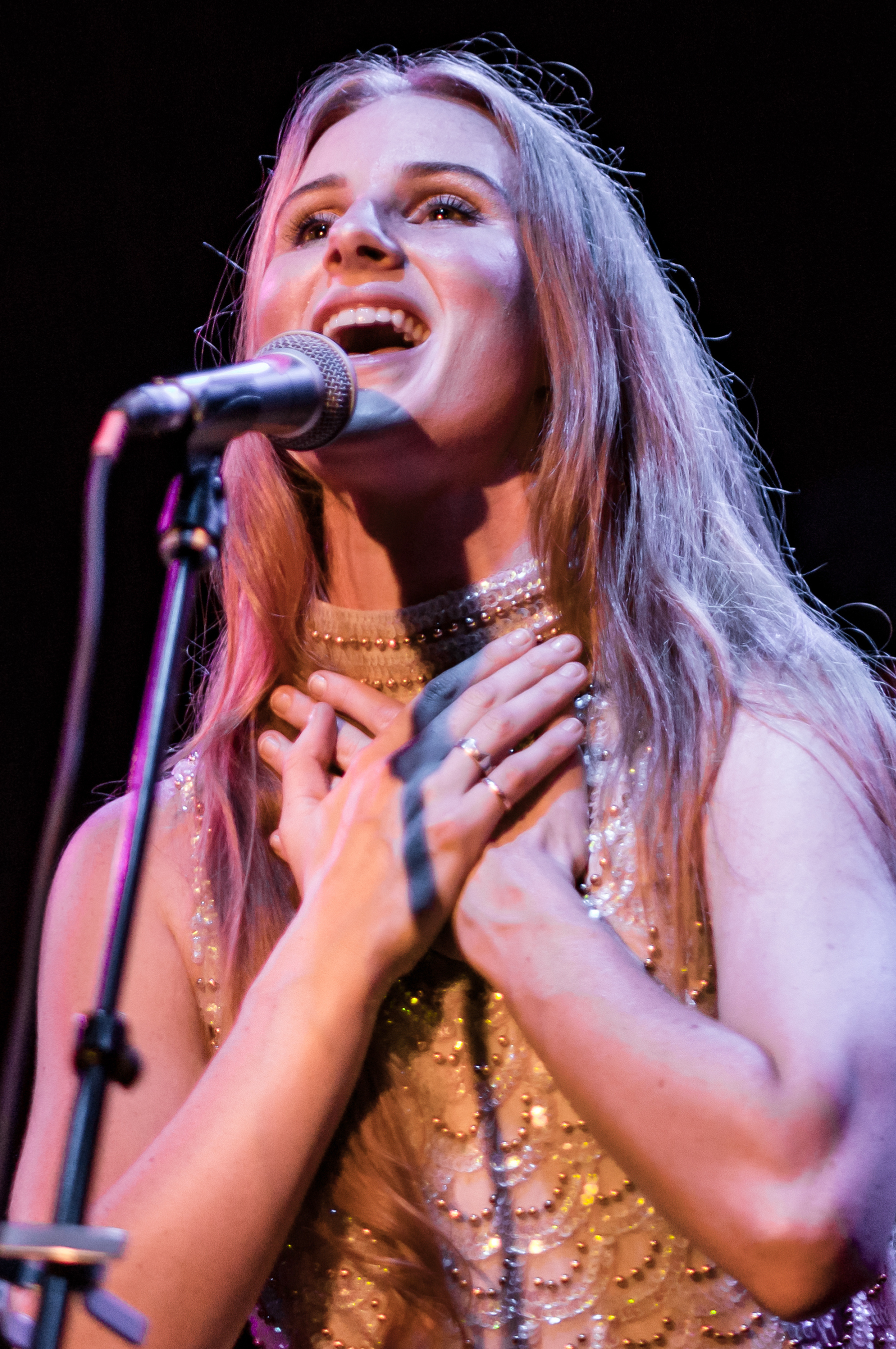
- Vera Blue performing in 2017
- Studio albums: 4
- EPs: 2
- Live albums: 1
- Singles: 24

Australian singer and songwriter, Celia Pavey (known professionally as Vera Blue) has released four studio albums, one live album, two extended play, and twenty-four singles (including three as featured artist). In 2013, Pavey auditioned for and placed third on second season of The Voice (Australia).

Since August 2015, Pavey has released music under the name Vera Blue.

In September 2025, Vera Blue performed the national anthem at the AFL Grand Final

== Albums ==
=== Studio albums ===
List of studio albums, with selected chart positions shown
| Title | Album details | Peak chart positions | Certifications |
| Title | Album details | AUS | Certifications |
|---|---|---|---|
| This Music (as Celia Pavey) | Released: 12 July 2013; Label: Mercury, Universal Music | 14 | |
| Perennial | Released: 21 July 2017; Label: Island Records, Universal Music | 6 | ARIA: Gold |
| Mercurial | Released: 28 October 2022; Label: Island Records, Universal Music | 61 | |
| Modern Rituals | Released: 21 August 2026; Label: Island Records, Universal Music | 12 | |

=== Live albums ===
List of live albums, with release date and label shown
| Title | Album details |
|---|---|
| Lady Powers Live at the Forum | Released: 26 October 2018; Label: Island Records, Universal Music; Formats: CD, digital download, streaming |

== Extended plays ==
List of EPs, with selected details
| Title | Details | Peak chart positions |
| Title | Details | AUS |
|---|---|---|
| Bodies (as Celia Pavey) | Released: 29 August 2014; Label: Mercury Records / Universal Music Australia; Format: Digital download | — |
| Fingertips | Released: 13 May 2016; Format: Digital download, streaming; Label: Universal Music Australia | 72 |

== Singles ==
=== As lead artist ===
List of singles, with year released and album details shown
| Title | Year | Peak chart positions | | Certifications | Album |
| Title | Year | AUS | NZ Hot | Certifications | Album |
|---|---|---|---|---|---|
| "Believe Me" (as Celia Pavey) | 2013 | — | — | | Non-album single |
| "Red" (as Celia Pavey) | 2014 | — | — | | Bodies |
| "Hold" | 2015 | 62 | — | ARIA: Platinum | Fingertips |
| "Settle" | 2016 | 79 | — | ARIA: Platinum | Fingertips |
| "Private" | 2017 | 84 | — | ARIA: Gold | Perennial |
| "Mended" | 2017 | 96 | — | ARIA: Platinum | Perennial |
| "Regular Touch" | 2017 | 97 | — | ARIA: 2× Platinum; RMNZ: Gold | Perennial |
| "Lady Powers" (featuring Kodie Shane) | 2018 | — | — | ARIA: Gold | Perennial |
| "All the Pretty Girls" | 2018 | 82 | — | ARIA: Platinum | Non-album singles |
| "Like I Remember You" | 2019 | — (Note: "Like I Remember You" did not enter the Top 100, but peaked at number 19 on the Hitseekers Singles Chart.) | — | ARIA: Gold | Non-album singles |
| "The Way That You Love Me" | 2019 | — (Note: "The Way That You Love Me" did not enter the Top 100, but peaked at number 14 on the Hitseekers Singles Chart.) | 30 | | Non-album singles |
| "Nobody Like You" (with Louis the Child) | 2020 | — | — | | Here for Now |
| "Heroes" | 2020 | — | — | | Non-album singles |
| "Lie to Me" | 2020 | — | — | ARIA: Gold | Non-album singles |
| "Temper" | 2021 | — | — | | Non-album singles |
| "The Curse" | 2022 | — | — | | Mercurial |
| "Mermaid Avenue" | 2022 | — | — | | Mercurial |
| "Feel Better" | 2022 | — | — | | Mercurial |
| "In the Corner" | 2025 | — | — | | Modern Rituals |
| "Parallel Desire" | 2025 | — | — | | Modern Rituals |
| "Go Lucky" | 2026 | — | — | | Modern Rituals |
| "Rituals" | 2026 | — | — | | Modern Rituals |
| "Maze" | 2026 | — | — | | Modern Rituals |
| "In My Head" | 2026 | — | — | | Modern Rituals |
| "—" denotes a recording that did not chart or was not released. | | | | | Modern Rituals |

=== As featured artist ===
List of singles, with selected details
| Title | Year | Peak chart positions | Certifications | Album |
| Title | Year | AUS | Certifications | Album |
|---|---|---|---|---|
| "Papercuts" (Illy featuring Vera Blue) | 2016 | 2 | ARIA: 8× Platinum; RMNZ: Gold | Two Degrees |
| "Fracture" (Slumberjack featuring Vera Blue) | 2017 | 89 | ARIA: Gold | Fracture |
| "Rushing Back" (Flume featuring Vera Blue) | 2019 | 8 | ARIA: 6× Platinum; RMNZ: 2× Platinum | Non-album single |

=== Promotional singles ===
List of promotional singles
| Title | Year | Album |
|---|---|---|
| "Young Melody" (Pnau featuring Vera Blue) | 2017 | Changa |
| "First Week" (acoustic) | 2017 | Perennial |
| "Nothing Compares 2 U" (Live at SynthTemple) | 2025 | recorded to promote SynthTemple |

== Guest appearances ==
List of non-single guest appearances
| Title | Year | Album |
|---|---|---|
| "I Know How It Goes" (Nina Las Vegas featuring Vera Blue and Ecca Vandal) | 2018 | Lucky Girl |
| "Regular Touch" | 2020 | Music from the Home Front |
| "Other Side" (Illenium, Said the Sky and Vera Blue) | 2023 | Illenium |
| "Chemistry" (Chris Lake featuring Vera Blue) | 2025 | Chemistry |

== Other charted and certified songs ==
| Title | Year | Peak chart positions | Certifications | Album |
| Title | Year | AUS | Certifications | Album |
|---|---|---|---|---|
| "Scarborough Fair/Canticle" | 2013 | 27 | | This Music |
| "A Thousand Years" | 2013 | 23 | | This Music |
| "Woodstock" | 2013 | 29 | | This Music |
| "Jolene" | 2013 | 15 | | This Music |
| "Edelweiss" | 2013 | 23 | | This Music |
| "Will You Still Love Me Tomorrow" | 2013 | 23 | | This Music |
| "Xanadu" | 2013 | 73 | | This Music |
| "Give In" | 2017 | — | ARIA: Gold | Perennial |
"—" denotes a recording that did not chart or was not released.
