= Lady Powers Live at the Forum =

Live album by Vera Blue
- Released: 26 October 2018
- Recorded: 2 June 2018
- Venue: Forum Theatre, Melbourne
- Label: Universal Music Australia

Vera Blue chronology
Perennial (2017)	Lady Powers Live at the Forum (2018)	Mercurial (2022)

Lady Powers Live at the Forum is the first live album by Australian folk musician Vera Blue. The album was recorded on 2 June 2018 at the Forum Theatre, Melbourne during her Lady Powers Tour and includes tracks from her extended play Fingertips and studio album Perennial. The album was released digitally on 26 October 2018.

== Promotion ==
16 live videos, filmed from the show, will be released weekly with the first being "Magazine" on 26 October 2018.

== Track listing ==
No.	Title	Writer(s)	Length
1.	"Magazine"	Celia Pavey; Andrew Macken; T. Thomas Macken; Adam Anders	4:41
2.	"Give In"	Pavey; A. Macken; T. Macken	4:47
3.	"Fingertips"	A. Macken; T. Macken; Helen Croome	3:44
4.	"Settle"	Pavey; A. Macken; T. Macken; Croome	4:19
5.	"Overachiever"	Pavey; A. Macken; T. Macken; Anders	3:44
6.	"Patterns"	Pavey; A. Macken; T. Macken	4:23
7.	"We Used To"	Pavey; A. Macken; T. Macken	3:19
8.	"Interlude"		1:12
9.	"Private"	Pavey; A. Macken; T. Macken	3:10
10.	"First Week"	Pavey; A. Macken; T. Macken; Anders; Croome	4:14
11.	"Fools"	Pavey; A. Macken; T. Macken	3:21
12.	"Hold"	Pavey; A. Macken; T. Macken; Croome	4:14
13.	"Pedestal/Cover Me"	Pavey; A. Macken; T. Macken	6:44
14.	"Said Goodbye to Your Mother"	Pavey; A. Macken; T. Macken	4:11
15.	"Mended"	Pavey; A. Macken; T. Macken; Anders; Samuel Telford	5:24
16.	"Regular Touch"	Pavey; A. Macken; T. Macken; Anders; Croome	5:39
17.	"Lady Powers"	Pavey; A. Macken; T. Macken; Anders	6:03

== Release history ==
Region	Date	Format(s)	Label
Australia	26 October 2018	Digital download,	Universal Music Australia
