= Temper =

Temper, tempered or tempering may refer to:

== Heat treatment ==
- Tempering (metallurgy), a heat treatment technique to increase the toughness of iron-based alloys
  - Temper mill, a steel processing line
- Tempering (spices), a cooking technique where spices are roasted briefly in oil or ghee
- Tempered glass, a type of safety glass processed by controlled thermal or chemical treatments
- Tempering chocolate, processing to ensure a uniform sheen and crisp bite
- Temper (pottery), a non-plastic material added to clay to prevent shrinkage during drying and firing

== Arts and entertainment ==
- Temper (film), a 2015 Telugu film
  - Temper (soundtrack), or the title track, 2015
- Temper (band), a dance music group
- Tempers, an American synth-pop band
- Temper (artist), an English graffiti artist
- Temper, a 2008 album by Benoit Pioulard
- "Temper", a song by Cyberaktif from the 1991 album Tenebrae Vision
- "Temper", a 2021 song by Vera Blue
- Temper, or, Domestic Scenes, a novel by Amelia Opie, 1812–1813
- The Tempering, a young-adult novel by Gloria Skurzynski, 1983
- Temper, a Marvel Comics character formerly known as Oya
- Kanthaswamy, a 2009 Indian Tamil-language film, titled Temper 2 in Hindi
- Temper (Drayden novel), a 2018 novel by Nicky Drayden
- Temper (Fargo novel), a 2019 novel by Layne Fargo

== Other uses ==
- Tempering (music), adjusting the musical temperament of an instrument
- Tempered distribution, in mathematics
- Tempered representation, in mathematics
- Temper, an alternate spelling of Tempel (boat), a type of native cargo boat from the Philippines

== See also ==
- Temper Temper (disambiguation)
- Tremper (disambiguation)
- True Temper (disambiguation)
- Temperament, in psychology, consistent individual differences in behavior that are biologically based
- The Well-Tempered Clavier, a composition by Bach
- Irritability, low frustration tolerance and high frustration tolerance, related to temper.
