= Music from the Home Front (album) =

Live album by Various artists
- Released: 19 June 2020
- Recorded: 25 April 2020
- Venue: Australia; New Zealand
- Label: Bloodlines

Music from the Home Front is a live album recorded by various Australian and New Zealand artists, released on 19 June 2020 through Bloodlines. The album features performances from the live concert of the same name.

== Background ==
The album is a recording of the live concert of the same name, which was held across Australia and New Zealand on 25 April 2020 to pay tribute to the Australian and New Zealand Army Corps (ANZACs) and health workers at the frontline of the response to the COVID-19 pandemic.

Discussing the album in a press release, Mushroom Group founder and record label executive Michael Gudinski said:

"I am so proud of the results, humbled by the reaction to our incredible musical talent, and now so pleased to bring you this album to commemorate that special night."

== Release ==
Michel Gudinski announced the release of Music from the Home Front on 29 May 2020.

The album was released on 19 June 2020 through Bloodlines and Universal Music, on 2×CD, digital download, and streaming.

The album received a limited edition 3×LP release on 4 September 2020. Each copy was individually numbered.

== Track listing ==
Disc one
No.	Title	Artist	Length
1.	"Welcome Speech"	Michael Gudinski	1:11
2.	"Working Class Man"	Jimmy Barnes featuring Diesel	4:44
3.	"We're All in This Together"	Ben Lee featuring Jack River and Lime Cordiale	3:50
4.	"Handwashing Song"	The Wiggles	1:54
5.	"Forever Young"	Tones and I	2:37
6.	"Throw Your Arms Around Me"	Mark Seymour featuring James Reyne and Hannah and Eva Seymour	3:07
7.	"Reckless"	James Reyne featuring Mark Seymour	3:10
8.	"I Was Only 19 (A Walk in the Light Green)"	John Schumann featuring the Vagabond Crew and Archie Roach	5:12
9.	"Moments"	Bliss n Eso featuring Kate Ceberano and Vince Harder	3:41
10.	"Don't Dream It's Over"	Crowded House	4:16
11.	"Be Alright"	Dean Lewis	3:19
12.	"Every Day My Mother's Voice"	Paul Kelly featuring Jess Hitchcock	2:35
13.	"Live in Life"	The Rubens	3:36

Disc two
No.	Title	Artist	Length
1.	"Never Tear Us Apart"	Jon Stevens, Andrew Farriss and Isabella Manfredi	3:53
2.	"Down Under"	Delta Goodrem and Colin Hay	3:47
3.	"Lay It on Me" (Smartphone isolation version)	Vance Joy	3:25
4.	"Carry You"	Missy Higgins and Tim Minchin	3:17
5.	"About You"	G Flip	3:56
6.	"Better Be Home Soon"	DMA's	2:50
7.	"Spirit of the Anzacs"	Lee Kernaghan featuring Amy and George Sheppard & Jon Stevens	3:42
8.	"Solid Rock"	Shane Howard featuring Vika and Linda, Emma Donovan, Troy Cassar-Daley & William Barton	4:14
9.	"Battle Scars"	Guy Sebastian	4:18
10.	"Unbreakable"	Birds of Tokyo and West Australian Symphony Orchestra	3:17
11.	"Regular Touch"	Vera Blue	3:35
12.	"Fool's Gold"	Jack River	3:53
13.	"When the War Is Over"	Jimmy Barnes and Ian Moss featuring the Barnes Family	4:45
14.	"The Last Post"	James Morrison	1:53

== Charts ==
=== Weekly charts ===
Weekly chart performance for Music from the Home Front
Chart (2020)	Peak position
Australian Albums (ARIA)	1

=== Year-end charts ===
Year-end chart performance for Music from the Home Front
Chart (2020)	Position
Australian Albums (ARIA)	20

== See also ==
- List of number-one albums of 2020 (Australia)

== Release history ==
Release history and formats for Music from the Home Front
Region	Date	Format	Label	Catalogue	Ref.
Various	19 June 2020	2×CD; digital download; streaming	Bloodlines; Universal Music	BLOOD75	
Australia	4 September 2020	3×LP (limited edition; individually numbered)	Bloodlines; Universal Music	BLOODLP75	
