= The Father and Daughter =

1801 novel by Amelia Opie

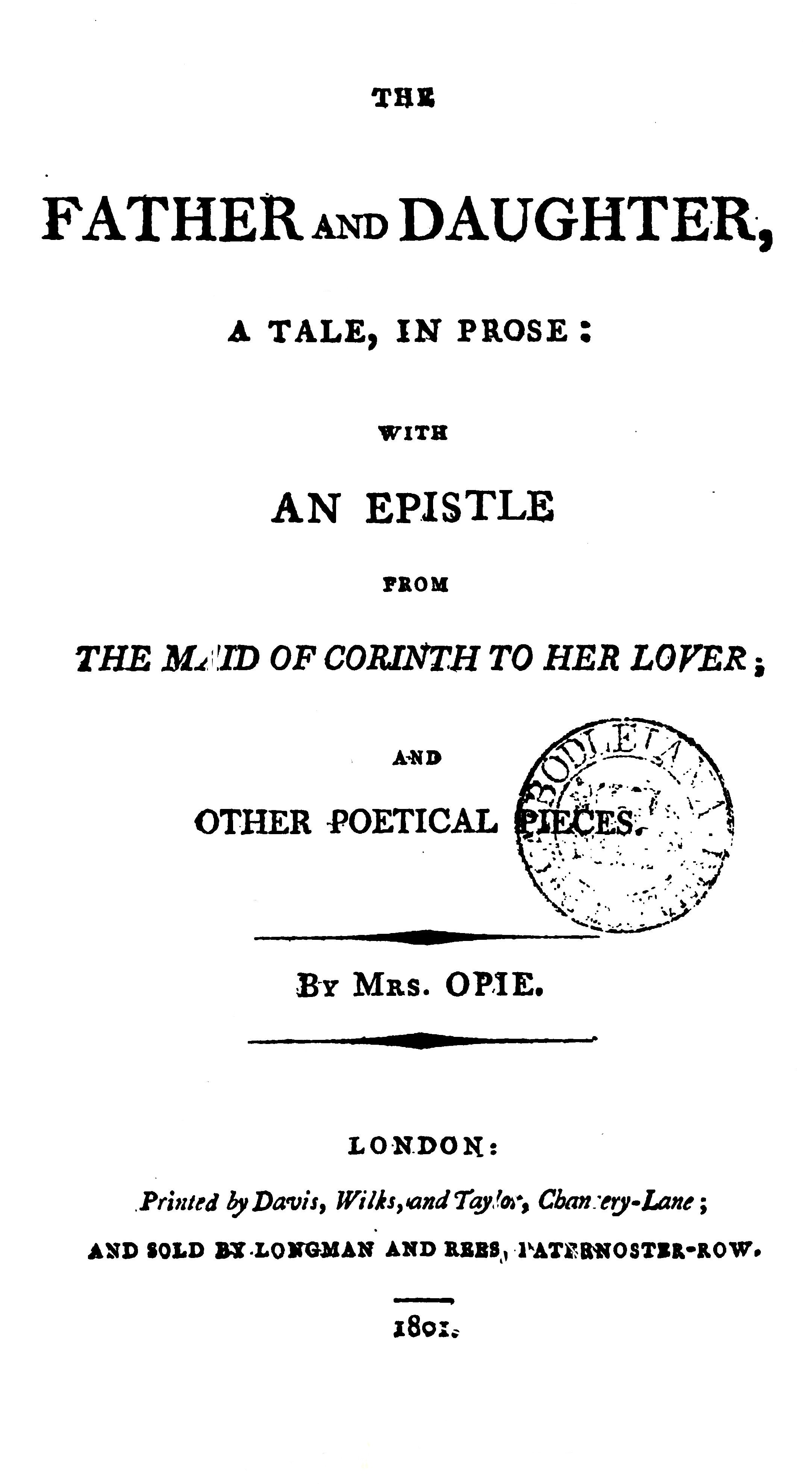
First edition title page

The Father and Daughter is a novel by Amelia Opie that was published in 1801. It was Opie's first novel published under her own name (an earlier novel, Dangers of Coquetry, was published anonymously).

== Synopsis ==
The novel opens with Agnes Fitzhenry, a repentant 'fallen woman', returning to her father's house with her illegitimate son, Edward.

It turns out that Agnes's father was driven mad from the shock of her elopement with a libertine (Clifford), and her supposed death. Agnes stays in order to nurse her father, and ultimately earns the respect of many (although not all) in the local community. However, she constantly feels a deep sense of shame and unworthiness.

Eventually, Agnes's father recognises her, forgives her and acknowledges all she has done for him. Both he and Agnes die in quick succession, and are buried in the same grave.

Clifford happens to come across the funeral procession. Although he does not repent his mistreatment of Agnes, he decides to take Edward away in order to make the boy his heir.

== Reception ==
The Father and Daughter proved very popular. It ran to at least nine editions during the first three decades of the nineteenth century, and was also adapted into an opera and two plays.

Several contemporary reviews praised the novel's use of pathos.

Thomas Robinson suggested that Opie was seeking to develop a middle ground between the sexual politics of William Godwin (who vehemently opposed the institution of marriage) and Hannah More (who supported it).
