= The Way That You Love Me =

The Way That You Love Me may refer to:

- "The Way That You Love Me" (Vera Blue song), 2019
- "(It's Just) The Way That You Love Me", a 1988 song by Paula Abdul
