= All the Pretty Girls =

All the Pretty Girls may refer to:

- "All the Pretty Girls" (Kenny Chesney song), 2017
- "All the Pretty Girls" (Vera Blue song), 2018
- "All the Pretty Girls", a song by Fun from the 2009 album Aim and Ignite
- "All the Pretty Girls", a song by Kaleo from the 2016 album A/B
- "All the Pretty Girls", a song by the Darkness from the 2017 album Pinewood Smile
- "All the Pretty Girls", a book by J.T. Ellison
