= Madeline, A Tale =

Two-volume novel by Amelia Opie

Madeline, A Tale is a two-volume novel by Amelia Opie that was published in 1822. It was Opie's last completed novel, and explores issues of class, gender and insanity.

== Synopsis ==
The novel is told in the first-person, by its heroine Madeline Munro. Born to poor Scottish cottagers, as a child Madeline was adopted and brought up by a wealthy couple. When her patroness dies, she returns to her birth family. She falls in love with Mr. Falconer, the local laird, and the couple have a 'Scotch marriage' (these were not officiated by an officially sanctioned authority, but were nevertheless still legally binding in Scotland). Falconer insists that the marriage must be kept secret because Madeline's lower social status will anger his sister, and also because it will help his career if people think he is still a bachelor. Opie portrays Falconer as a selfish and unworthy character; whereas Maclean, a clergyman whom she might have married, is consistently shown as a good and worthy man.

Madeline, although Falconer's lawful wife, must now pretend to be his mistress. Opie has Madeline face similar problems to her more well-known heroine Adeline Mowbray (including the fact that other men will try to sexually exploit her because they think that she is a mistress). Madeline's mental and physical health deteriorates. When it seems that Falconer is about to abandon her, she proactively sets out to dissolve their marriage, and travels to London with their baby son. She manages to sell several of her own paintings, and makes enough money to live comfortably in London with her son. Although broken-hearted at separating from her husband, she concludes that it is better to claim her freedom and be seen by society as a 'dishonourable' woman than to remain in a loveless clandestine marriage.

Eventually, Falconer and Madeline's marriage is publicly acknowledged. Madeline is very ill, but after a contrite Glencarron brings her parents to his estate and tries to mend bonds between the families, she finally recovers.

== Reception ==
Madeline was one of Opie's least commercially successful works.

David Thame calls the novel 'the summation of Opie's craft' as a writer, and that 'Opie transcends the convention of the love mad woman'.

Meghan Burke Hattaway argues that the novel is more unconventional than it first appears, particularly in the figure of Madeline:

'Secure in the sense of her own righteousness and supporting herself mentally and financially through modes of self-expression (as she writes for her sanity, and paints for her money), Madeline disregards the unsatisfactory available roles of "wife" or "whore" and is instead posed to survive and thrive respectably in an identity of her own making'.
