= Fingertips (disambiguation) =

"Fingertips" is a 1963 song by Stevie Wonder.

Fingertips may also refer to:

- Fingertips, the tips of fingers
- Fingertips (plant), or Dudleya edulis, a succulent plant
- Finger Tips, a 2001–2008 British children's TV show

== Music ==
- Fingertips (band), a Portuguese pop rock band
- Fingertips (album) or the title song, by the Cockroaches, 1988
- Fingertips (EP), by Vera Blue, 2016
- "Fingertips", a suite of songs by They Might Be Giants from Apollo 18, 1992
- "Fingertips", a song by Felguk, 2009
- "Fingertips", a song by One Republic from Oh My My, 2016
- "Fingertips", a song by Tom Gregory, 2020
- "Fingertips", a song by Lana Del Rey from Did You Know That There's a Tunnel Under Ocean Blvd, 2023
- "Fingertips", a song by Unwound from Unwound, 1995

== See also ==
- "Fingertips '93", a song by Roxette
- "Fingertip" (song), by GFriend, 2017
- Fingertip (web series), a 2019 Indian Tamil-language series
