= Mercurial (album) =

Studio album by Vera Blue
- Released: 28 October 2022
- Genre: Indie pop
- Length: 33:17
- Labels: Island; UMA

Vera Blue chronology
Lady Powers Live at the Forum (2018)	Mercurial (2022)	Modern Rituals (2026)

Singles from Mercurial
- 1. "The Curse" Released: 25 May 2022; 2. "Mermaid Avenue" Released: 16 September 2022; 3. "Feel Better" Released: 4 November 2022

Mercurial is the third studio album by Australian folk musician Vera Blue (the second under the name Vera Blue). It was released on 28 October 2022 through Island Records Australia.

Upon announcement on 31 August 2022, Vera Blue said "This body of work has been a long time coming and tells the stories of my life since Perennial came into the world. This album is colourful, emotional, personal, chaotic, passionate, transformative and beautiful and most of all, mercurial." The album was preceded by the release of the singles "The Curse" and "Mermaid Avenue". To support the album, Vera Blue embarked on the Mercurial Tour, commencing in the Gold Coast on 3 November 2022.

Mercurial was released on vinyl on 12 May 2023 featuring two new songs, "One Condition" and "Take Your Time".

== Reception ==
Bryget Chrisfield from Beat Magazine said: "Mercurial intersperses soul-searching ballads with electropop bangers for dancing the hurt away." Chrisfield ended the review saying, "her vocals are perennially flawless and, throughout the deeply personal Mercurial, Pavey embraces vulnerability as a superpower."

Zoë Radas from Stack Magazine said: "Mercurial has been crafted with the stage in mind; it's changeable and volatile like its namesake, full of thick bass and synths, and imbued with an urgent spirit."

== Track listing ==
All tracks are written by Celia Pavey, Andy Mak, and Thom Mak, except where noted. All tracks are produced by Andy Mak and Thom Mak, except where noted.

Mercurial standard edition track listing
No.	Title	Writer(s)	Producer(s)	Length
1.	"Alright Now"			3:32
2.	"Lethal"			2:49
3.	"Feel Better"			3:07
4.	"The Curse"	Pavey; Billy Johnston	A. Mak; Johnston	2:44
5.	"Heart Still Works"			3:55
6.	"Everything Is Wonderful"			3:22
7.	"Wherever We Go"			3:19
8.	"Mermaid Avenue"			3:09
9.	"Trust Fall"	Pavey; Steve Solomon; Andrew Goldstein	A. Mak; Solomon	3:31
10.	"Red Rose"			3:49
Total length:				33:17

Mercurial deluxe edition track listing
No.	Title	Writer(s)	Producer(s)	Length
3.	"One Condition"			3:18
4.	"Feel Better"			3:07
5.	"The Curse"	Pavey; Johnston	A. Mak; Johnston	2:44
6.	"Heart Still Works"			3:55
7.	"Everything Is Wonderful"			3:22
8.	"Take Your Time"			3:39
9.	"Wherever We Go"			3:19
10.	"Mermaid Avenue"			3:09
11.	"Trust Fall"	Pavey; Solomon; Goldstein	A. Mak; Solomon	3:31
12.	"Red Rose"			3:48
Total length:				40:13

== Personnel ==
Musicians

- Celia Pavey – vocals
- Andy Mak – programming (all tracks), synthesizer (1–9), bass guitar (3, 4), piano (4, 6, 8–10), drums (5, 7), guitar (7); background vocals, strings (10)
- Thom Mak – guitar (tracks 1, 4, 5, 7), synthesizer (1–3, 5–8, 10), bass guitar (3), background vocals (10)
- Billy Johnston – programming, synthesizer (4)
- Steve Solomon – synthesizer (9)

Technical

- Stuart Hawkes – mastering
- Scott Horscroft – mixing (1–3, 5–10)
- Mark Rankin – mixing (4)
- Andy Mak – engineering (1–10)
- Jackson Barclay – engineering (1, 5, 7, 10)
- Billy Johnston – engineering (4)
- Thom Mak – engineering (4)
- Steve Solomon – engineering (9)

== Charts ==
Chart performance for Mercurial
Chart (2022)	Peak position
Australian Albums (ARIA)	61

== Release history ==
Release dates and formats for Mercurial
Region	Date	Format(s)	Edition(s)	Label	Catalogue	Ref.
Australia	28 October 2022	Digital download; streaming; CD	Standard	Island; UMA	4850893	
Australia	12 May 2023	Vinyl	Standard	Island; UMA	5501531	
Australia	12 May 2023	Digital download; streaming; vinyl	Deluxe	Island; UMA	4557912	
