= Valentine's Eve =

Novel by Amelia Opie

Valentine's Eve is a novel by Amelia Opie that was published in 1816. Through the trials of its heroine, Opie explores the challenge of living virtuously in a corrupt society.

== Synopsis ==
After Catherine Shirley's father dies in battle, she is adopted by her grandfather, General Shirley.

Catherine is deeply pious and trusting in other people. She marries Lord Shirley (her cousin), and they have twins. After he wrongly suspects her of infidelity, he takes the children away from her.

Lucy Merle (Catherine's republican friend) and Lord Livesay (a friend of Catherine's husband) successfully prove Catherine's innocence. Catherine is briefly reunited with her husband and children, but she dies shortly afterwards.

== Reception ==
Opie was dismayed to find that Valentine's Eve displeased many of her Quaker friends and acquaintances - in part because of its allusions to adultery, seduction, and a brothel.

The novel was not received particularly well by reviewers. One reviewer felt that it 'is not calculated either by its conduct or its circumstances to display advantageously the talents of the writer'.

The character of Catherine has similarities with the virtuous heroine of Samuel Richardson's popular novel Clarissa (1748). However, Isabelle Marie Cosgrave argues that the ending of Valentine's Eve is even bleaker than that of Clarissa. She suggests that Valentine's Eve implicitly criticises both 'worldly' society and the Established Church, for failing to support those who try and live according to their Christian principles:

"It is through society’s refusal to acknowledge the importance of religion in everyday life – and the malice that virtuous piety seems to invite – that Catherine Shirley comes to die ... Since Catherine does nothing wrong in Valentine’s Eve to warrant her death, the reader must question what kind of reward might be possible for such a pious woman in such a hostile world, and it is the sort of question that is not normally asked of the readers of a ‘moral-evangelical’ novel."
