= Perennial (Vera Blue album) =

Studio album by Vera Blue
- Released: 21 July 2017
- Genres: Electropop, folk, alternative pop
- Length: 44:52
- Labels: Island Records, UMA

Vera Blue chronology
Fingertips (2016)	Perennial (2017)	Lady Powers Live at the Forum (2018)

Singles from Perennial
- 1. "Private" Released: 17 February 2017; 2. "Mended" Released: 26 May 2017; 3. "Regular Touch" Released: 14 July 2017; 4. "Lady Powers" Released: 2 March 2018

Perennial is the second studio album by Australian folk musician Vera Blue (the first under the name Vera Blue). The album was announced on 15 June 2017, and released on 21 July 2017.

Upon announcement, Vera Blue said: "Perennial is a term for plants that come back year after year, and I like to relate that to memory, feelings and emotions. It's what the record is all about; relationships can be very cyclical, or never-ending, but that isn't necessarily a bad thing. It's just part of life." The album was recorded between Sydney and Los Angeles and is arranged into three chapters which chronologically trace the development of the songwriter.

Vera Blue promoted the album with a national tour across Australia from July to September 2017.

At the J Awards of 2017, the album was nominated for Australian Album of the Year.

== Reception ==
Professional ratings
Review scores
Source	Rating
Herald Sun	3.5/4 stars
Rolling Stone	3/5 stars
Renowned for Sound	3.5/5 stars

Cameron Adams from the Herald Sun said: "Pavey and her creative partners Andy and Thom Mak fire up a deep house beat, where the bass goes low while Pavey's voice hovers above, detailing how with a few billion humans on the earth she can afford to be choosy. "Magazine" and "Regular Touch" are what you could even call bangers—it's as if Pavey is cutting out the middle man and remixing herself ... and it works."

Annabel Ross from Rolling Stone felt that "There's nothing subdued about the dubby organ chorus on "First Week", or the calamitous, whirring sirens on "Private", and with Andy and Thom Mak producing, it's all reasonably tasteful, if reeking a little of artifice. Pavey's lyrics, meanwhile, are undoubtedly hers. She's been through a breakup and spends a good few tracks singing about it." adding "Pavey needn’t forget that her unvarnished voice has always been her biggest asset."

Haydon Benfield from Renowned for Sound wrote "Pavey hasn’t sought to reinvent the wheel she rolled out with the EP. If anything, she has doubled down on the formula that proved so successful last year", adding "Knowing that her voice is the drawcard, and recognising the value in restraint, Pavey selectively deploys the gorgeous vocal harmonies and layers, and the surprising combinations of these with the music, throughout Perennial."

Ross Maurice from Beat said "While there is a stylistic distinctiveness between individual tracks, the album is cohesive overall. Perennial is an ambitious debut. It follows a narrative of the initial rawness of a relationship which is then transformed into a celebration of renewal and vivacity."

== Track listing ==
Perennial track listing
No.	Title	Writer(s)	Producer(s)	Length
1.	"First Week"	Celia Pavey; Andrew Macken; Thomas Macken; Adam Anders; Helen Croome	Andy Mak; Adam Anders	4:13
2.	"Give In"	Pavey; A. Macken; T. Macken	Mak; Anders	3:41
3.	"Regular Touch"	Pavey; A. Macken; T. Macken; Anders; Croome	Mak; Anders	3:28
4.	"We Used To"	Pavey; A. Macken; T. Macken	Mak; Anders	3:21
5.	"Said Goodbye to Your Mother"	Pavey; A. Macken; T. Macken	Mak; Anders	4:02
6.	"Private"	Pavey; A. Macken; T. Macken	Mak	2:29
7.	"Lady Powers"	Pavey; A. Macken; T. Macken; Anders	Mak; Anders	2:53
8.	"Magazine"	Pavey; A. Macken; T. Macken; Anders	Mak; Anders	3:39
9.	"Fools"	Pavey; A. Macken; T. Macken	Mak	3:14
10.	"Overachiever"	Pavey; A. Macken; T. Macken; Anders	Mak; Anders	3:39
11.	"Pedestal/Cover Me"	Pavey; A. Macken; T. Macken	Mak; Anders	5:08
12.	"Mended"	Pavey; A. Macken; T. Macken; Anders; Samuel Telford	Mak; Macken; Anders	5:05
Total length:				44:52

iTunes edition bonus tracks
No.	Title	Writer(s)	Producer(s)	Length
13.	"Settle"	Pavey; A. Macken; T. Macken; Croome	Mak; Vera Blue	3:40
14.	"Hold"	Pavey; A. Macken; T. Macken; Croome	Mak	4:08
Total length:				52:40

== Charts ==
Chart performance for Perennial
Chart (2017)	Peak position
Australian Albums (ARIA)	6

== Certifications ==
Certifications for Perennial
Region	Certification	Certified units/sales
Australia (ARIA)	Gold	35,000^{‡}
^{‡} Sales+streaming figures based on certification alone.

== Release history ==
Release history and formats for Perennial
Region	Date	Format(s)	Label	Catalogue
Australia	21 July 2017	Digital download, CD	Universal Music Australia	5766890
Australia	1 September 2017	Vinyl	Universal Music Australia	5775089
