= Amelia Opie =

English novelist and abolitionist (1769–1853)

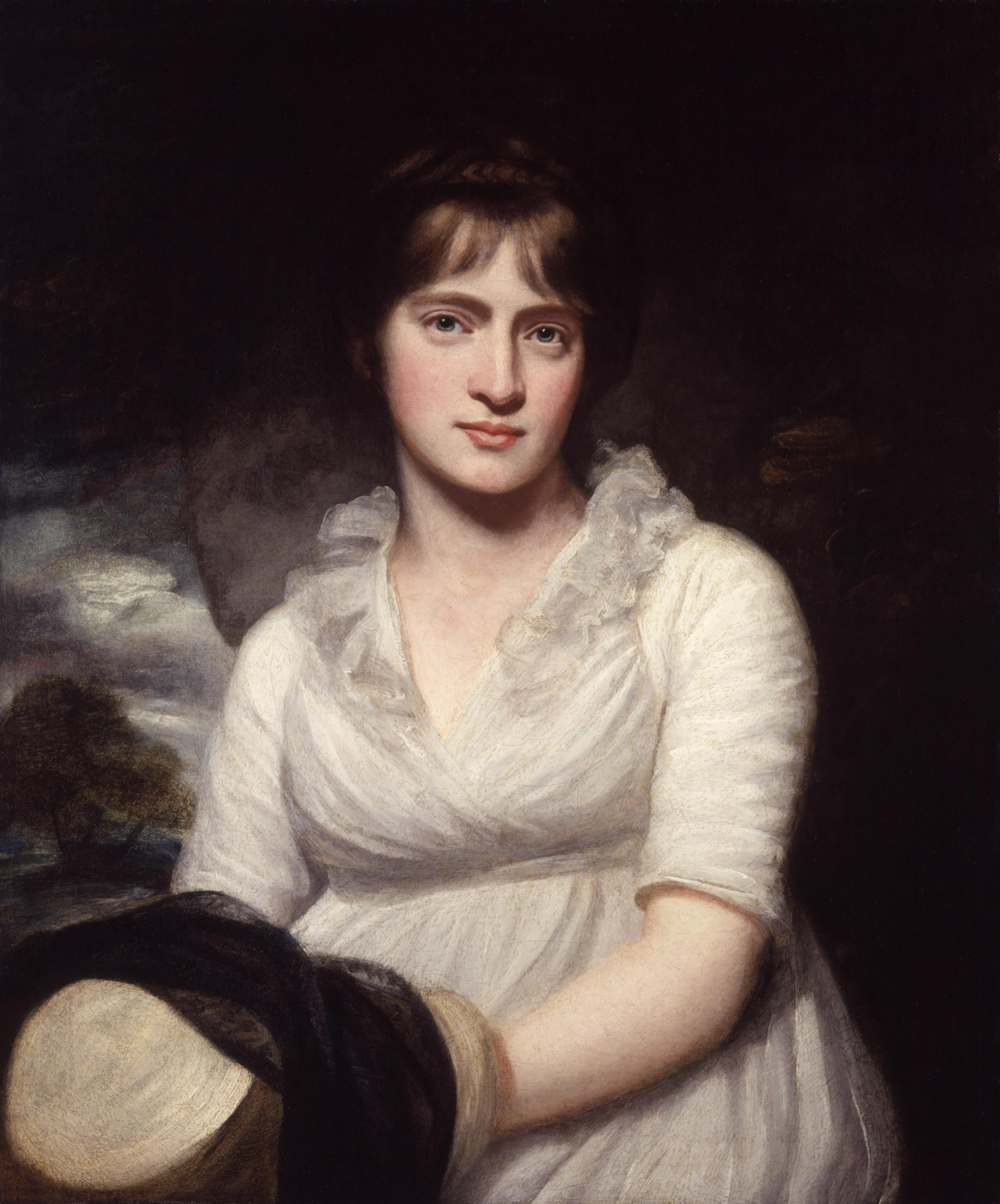
- 1798 Portrait of Amelia Opie by her husband, John Opie
- Born: Amelia Alderson; 12 November 1769; Norwich, Norfolk
- Died: 2 December 1853 (aged 84); Norwich, Norfolk
- Resting place: Gildencroft Quaker Cemetery, Norwich
- Occupations: Novelist, poet
- Spouse: John Opie

Amelia Opie (born Amelia Alderson; 12 November 1769 – 2 December 1853) was an English author and abolitionist who published numerous novels in the Romantic period up to 1828. A Whig supporter and Bluestocking, Opie was also a leading abolitionist in Norwich. Hers was the first of 187,000 names presented to the British Parliament on a petition from women to stop slavery.

== Early life and influences ==
Amelia Alderson was born on 12 November 1769. An only child, she was the daughter of James Alderson, a physician, and Amelia Briggs of Norwich. Her mother also brought her up to care for those who came from less privileged backgrounds. After her mother's death on 31 December 1784, she became her father's housekeeper and hostess, remaining very close to him until his death in 1807.

According to her biographer, Opie "was vivacious, attractive, interested in fine clothes, educated in genteel accomplishments, and had several admirers." She was able to speak French, having learnt from John Bruckner. She was a cousin of the judge Sir Edward Hall Alderson, with whom she corresponded throughout her life, and was also a cousin of the artist Henry Perronet Briggs. Alderson inherited radical principles and was an ardent admirer of John Horne Tooke. She was close to activists John Philip Kemble, Sarah Siddons, William Godwin and Mary Wollstonecraft. Along with Wollstonecraft, she was connected with the Blue Stockings Society.

== Career and connections ==
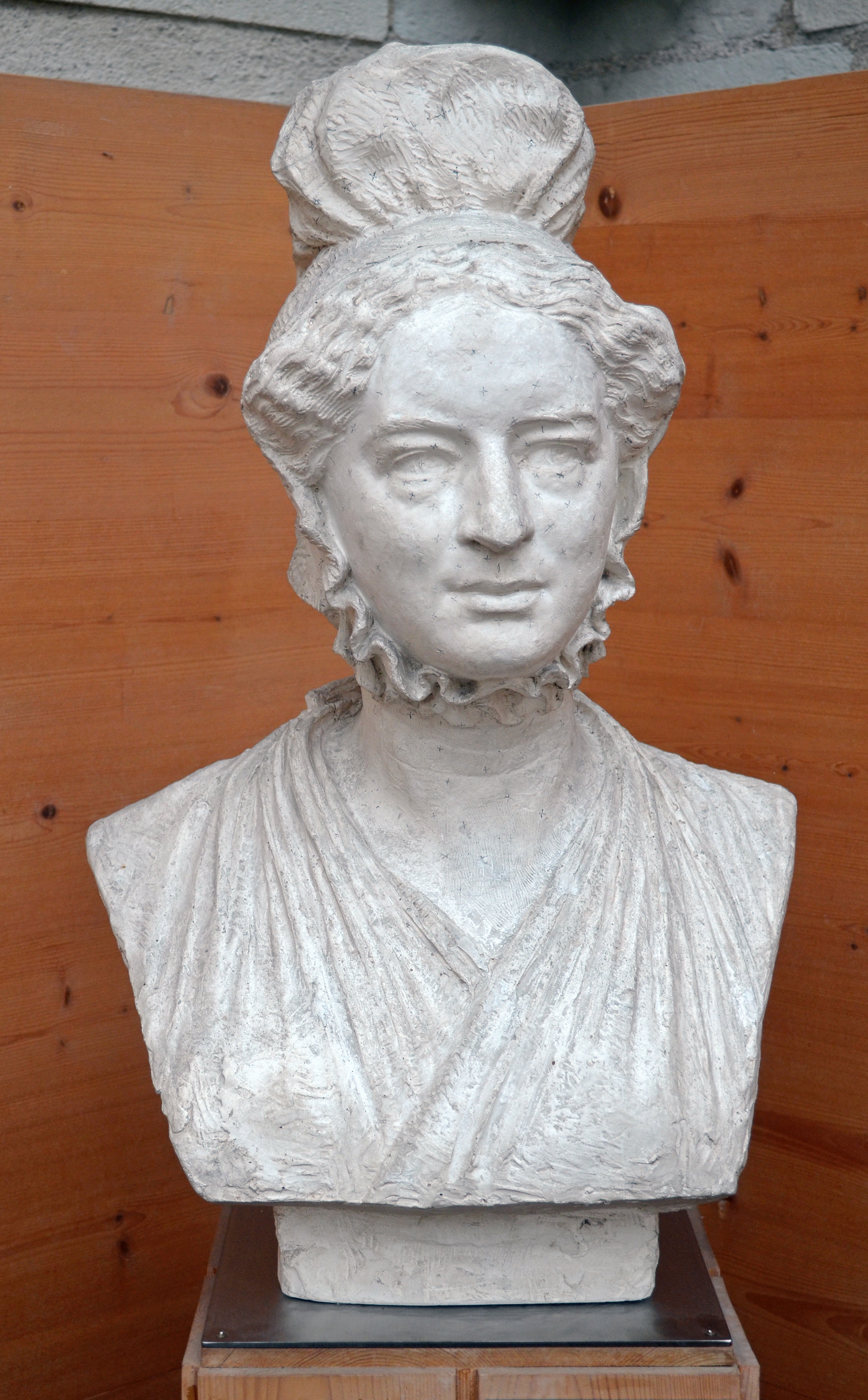
Amelia Opie by David d'Angers (1836)

Opie spent her youth writing poetry and plays and organizing amateur theatricals. She wrote The Dangers of Coquetry when she was 18 years old and by 1800 her "songs" (poems) - along with those of Georgiana, Duchess of Devonshire, Mrs Barbauld, Peter Pindar and R.B. Sheridan - were published and advertised widely throughout England.

Between the years 1790-1834, Opie had written 13 different works. In 1801, Opie's most famous novel was completed and titled Father and Daughter. Characterized as showing genuine fancy and pathos, the novel is about misled virtue and family reconciliation. After it came out, Opie began to publish regularly. Her volume of Poems, published in 1802, went through six editions. Encouraged by her husband to continue writing, she published Adeline Mowbray (1804), an exploration of women's education, marriage, and the abolition of slavery. This novel in particular is noted for engaging the history of Opie's former friend Mary Wollstonecraft, whose relationship with the American Gilbert Imlay outside of marriage caused some scandal, as did her later marriage to the philosopher William Godwin. Godwin had previously argued against marriage as an institution by which women were owned as property, but when Wollstonecraft became pregnant, they married despite his prior beliefs. In the novel, Adeline becomes involved with a philosopher early on, who takes a firm stand against marriage, only to be convinced to marry a West Indian landowner against her better judgement. The novel also engages abolitionist sentiment, in the story of a mixed-race woman and her family, whom Adeline saves from poverty at some expense to herself.

More novels followed: Simple Tales (1806), Temper (1812), Tales of Real Life (1813), Valentine's Eve (1816), Tales of the Heart (1818), and Madeline (1822). The Warrior's Return and other poems was published in 1808.

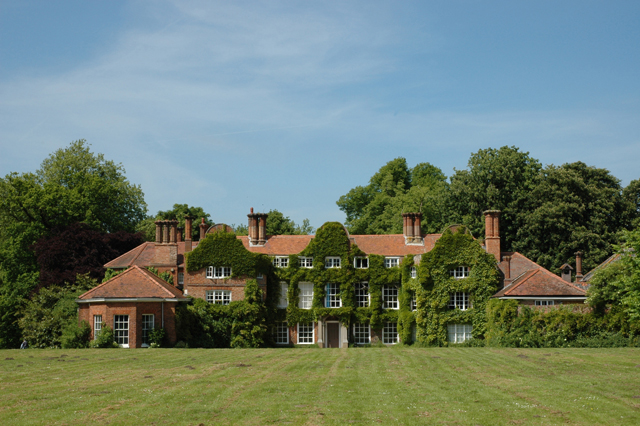
Earlham Hall - where Opie was a frequent guest and met her husband, John

In 1825, Opie joined the Society of Friends, due to the influence of Joseph John Gurney and his sisters, who were long-time friends and neighbours in Norwich, and despite the objections made by her recently deceased father. Opie had long known the Gurneys of Earlham Hall, Norfolk. Likewise, her future husband, artist John Opie, was "an intimate associate of the family" (having painted members of them) and met Amelia at Earlham in 1797. Amelia had been a friend of the Gurney sisters for many years. Alongside Amelia, Prince William Frederick had also been a guest at numerous balls and parties held at Earlham where the guests - both "old and young" - enjoyed "standing around his Princeship and singing - which pleased him amazingly". Harriet Martineau recalled her family's memories of the Gurney girls at this time "dressing in gay riding boots, and riding about the country to balls and gaieties of all sorts."

1840 World Anti-Slavery Convention. Move cursor to identify delegates – the female delegates are on the right.

In 1809, Opie published a biography on her husband John which accompanied the lectures he had given at the Royal Academy of Arts prior to his death in 1807. Her subscribers included Prince William Frederick and members of the Taylor, Gurney and Martineau families, all of whom were connected to Norwich, as was Amelia. Her friendship with the Duke of Gloucester remained firm; she stated "...he seemed so glad to see me" when reunited with him at the "African Meeting" at London's Freemasons' Tavern.

The rest of Opie's life was spent mostly in travel and working with charities. Meanwhile, she published an anti-slavery poem titled, The Black Man's Lament in 1826 and a volume of devotional poems, Lays for the Dead in 1834. Opie worked with Anna Gurney to create a Ladies Anti-Slavery Society in Norwich. This anti-slavery society organised a petition of 187,000 names that was presented to parliament. The first two names on the petition were Amelia Opie and Priscilla Buxton. Opie went to the World Anti-Slavery Convention in London in 1840 where she was one of the few women included in the commemorative painting.

== Personal life ==
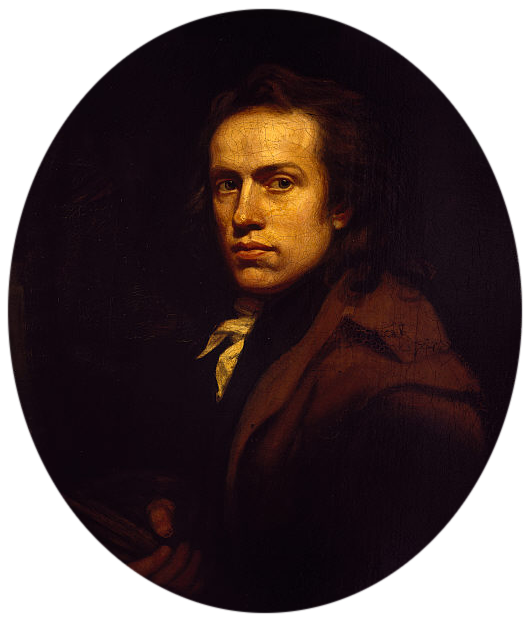
Amelia's husband, John Opie (self-portrait, 1789)

On 8 May 1798 she married artist John Opie at the Church of St Marylebone, Westminster, London. She had met Opie at a parties and balls in London and in Norfolk including at Holkham Hall where he had come to carry out some commissions for Thomas Coke. They lived at 8 Berners Street, London where Opie had moved in 1791. The couple spent nine years happily married, although her husband did not share her love of society, until his death in 1807. She divided her time between London and Norwich. She was a friend of writers Walter Scott, Richard Brinsley Sheridan and Germaine de Staël. Opie's concern for the well-being of writers is evident in a letter dated 12 December 1800 in which she wishes to hear from Susannah Taylor about the death of Dame Sarah Martineau whom Opie had met through their mutual friend Anna Laetitia Barbauld.

Even late in life, Opie maintained an interest and connections with writers, for instance receiving George Borrow as a guest. After a visit to Cromer, a seaside resort on the North Norfolk coast, she caught a chill and retired to her bedroom. A year later on 2 December 1853, she died at Norwich and was said to have retained her vivacity to the last. She was buried at the Gildencroft Quaker Cemetery, Norwich.

A somewhat sanitised biography of Opie, entitled A Life, by Cecilia Lucy Brightwell, was published in 1854.

One of her husband's portraits of her was copied by his friend Henry Bone who created an enamel portrait miniature of her "in 1798 or after". Bone's drawing for the miniature is held in London's National Portrait Gallery.

== Selected works ==
Novels and stories

- Dangers of Coquetry (published anonymously), 1790
- The Father and Daughter, 1801
- Adeline Mowbray, 1804
- Simple Tales, 1806
- Temper; or, Domestic Scenes, 1812
- First Chapter of Accidents, 1813
- Tales of Real Life, 1813
- Valentine's Eve, 1816
- New Tales, 1818
- Tales of the Heart, 1820
- The Only Child; or, Portia Bellendon (published anonymously), 1821
- Madeline, A Tale, 1822
- Illustrations of Lying, 1824
- Tales of the Pemberton Family for Children, 1825
- The Last Voyage, 1828
- Detraction Displayed, 1828
- Miscellaneous Tales (12 Vols), 1845–1847

Biographies

- Memoir of John Opie, 1809
- Sketch of Mrs. Roberts, 1814

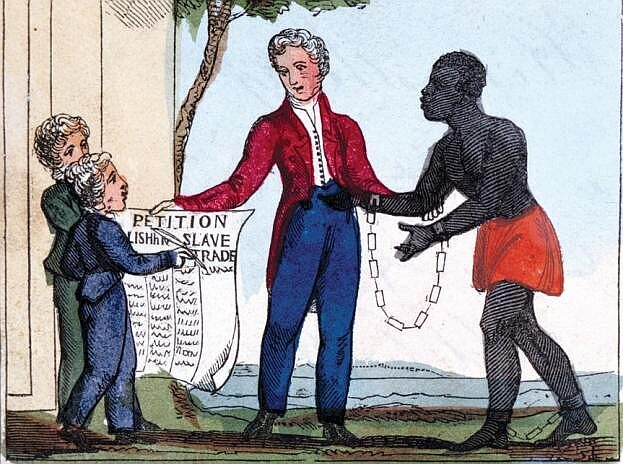
Illustration from the poetry book: The Black Man's Lament, Or, How to Make Sugar by Amelia Opie (London, 1826)

Poetry

- Maid of Corinth, 1801
- Elegy to the Memory of the Duke of Bedford, 1802
- Poems, 1802
- Lines to General Kosciusko, 1803
- Song to Stella, 1803
- The Warrior's Return and other poems, 1808
- The Black Man's Lament, 1826 (Wikisource text)
- Lays for the Dead, 1834

Miscellaneous

- Recollections of Days in Holland, 1840
- Recollections of a Visit to Paris in 1802, 1831–1832
- Winter's Beautiful Rose, a song with words by Opie and music by Jane Bianchi dedicated to the Viscountesses Hampden
