= Lie to Me (Vera Blue song) =

Single by Vera Blue
- Released: 20 August 2020
- Length: 3:46
- Label: Island Records Australia / Universal Music Australia
- Songwriter(s): Vera Blue; Andy Mak; Thom Mak; Thom Macken
- Producer(s): Andy Mak

Vera Blue singles chronology
"Heroes" (2020)	"Lie to Me" (2020)	"Temper" (2021)

Music video
- "Lie to Me" on YouTube

"Lie to Me" is a song by Australian singer songwriter Vera Blue, released on 20 August 2020 via Island Records Australia and Universal Music Australia.

Upon release, Vera Blue explained how the track touches on falling in love after a rough break-up. saying, "When you go through a lot of emotional shit, you can't imagine yourself in a new relationship. Then you suddenly fall into one, and the fear and mistrust can be overwhelming: 'is this as amazing as it seems – or is it going to blow up in my face again?'"

Furthermore, Vera Blue told Triple J the song is about "The beauty of falling in love but also the anxieties and fears of rejection that come with falling in love if you've been through past traumas or had your heart broken. The lyric 'lie to me' isn't necessarily aimed at anyone – it's a conversation with myself. It's the paranoia and little voices in my head."

The music video was directed by Onil Kotian and released on 8 September 2020.

== Track listing ==
Digital download

No.	Title	Length
1.	"Lie to Me"	3:46

No.	Title	Length
1.	"Lie to Me" (acoustic)	3:40
2.	"Lie to Me" (acoustic)	3:40

== Certifications ==
Region	Certification	Certified units/sales
Australia (ARIA)	Gold	35,000^{‡}
^{‡} Sales+streaming figures based on certification alone.

== Credits and personnel ==
Credits adapted from Spotify.

- Celia Pavey – vocals, writing
- Andy Mak – writing, production
- Thom Mak– writing
- Thom Macken – writing
