= Tremper =

Tremper may refer to:

== People ==
- George Nelson Tremper (1877–1958), American educator
  - George Nelson Tremper High School, or Tremper High School, in Kenosha, Wisconsin, U.S.
- Overton Tremper (1906–1996), American baseball player
- Will Tremper (1928–1998), German journalist and filmmaker
- Tremper Longman, American theologian and author

== Places ==
- Mount Tremper, or Tremper Mountain, one of the Catskill Mountains in New York, U.S.
  - Mount Tremper, New York, a hamlet
- Tremper Mound and Works, in Scioto County, Ohio, U.S.

== See also ==
- Temper (disambiguation)
- Tremp, a municipality in Catalonia, Spain
- Trevemper, a hamlet in Cornwall, UK
