= Fracture (song) =

Single by Slumberjack featuring Vera Blue

from the EP Fracture
- Released: 13 January 2017
- Recorded: 2016
- Length: 3:54
- Label: onelove
- Songwriter(s): Morgan Then * Fletcher Ehlers * Brooke Addamo

Slumberjack singles chronology
| "Open Fire" (2016) | "Fracture" (2017) | "Afraid, Unafraid" (2017) |

Vera Blue singles chronology
| "Papercuts" (2016) | "Fracture" (2017) | "Private" (2017) |

"Fracture" is a song by Australian band Slumberjack, featuring folk/indie-pop vocalist Vera Blue. The song was released on 13 January 2017 and peaked at number 89 on the ARIA Chart.

== Reception ==
Tom Williams from Music Feeds said the song mixes "eastern melodies with some heavy-as-hell drum kicks, as Pavey’s vocals glide over the top." Sosefina Fuamoli of The AU Review said Blue's vocals had "an icy edge" while also stating "onward pushing electro beats pulsate deeply". Joseph Smith of Stoney Roads stated "Vera Blue's vocal range is simply phenomenal, and she flaunts this effortlessly on top of Slumberjack’s hard-hitting, synth-heavy production that acts as a brilliant foundation." Farrell Sweeney of Dancing Astronaut said the track was "heavy enough to appeal to future bass lovers along with progressive house/pop lovers".

== Charts ==
| Chart (2017) | Peak position |
|---|---|
| Australian (ARIA) | 89 |
