= Temper Temper =

Temper Temper may refer to:

- Temper Temper (duo), a British musical duo
  - Temper Temper (Temper Temper album), the duo's 1991 album
- Temper Temper (Bullet for My Valentine album), 2013
  - "Temper Temper" (Bullet for My Valentine song)
- "Temper Temper" (Goldie song), 1998
- "Temper Temper" (Lime Cordiale song), 2017

== See also ==
- Temper (disambiguation)
