= Modern Rituals =

Studio album by Vera Blue
- Released: 21 August 2026
- Length: 25:27
- Labels: Island; UMA
- Producers: Lach Bostock; Chris Collins; Lionel Crasta; Eric J Dubowsky; Lucy Healey; Jono Ma; Celia Pavey; TimFromTheHouse; Upsidedownhead

Vera Blue chronology
Mercurial (2022)	Modern Rituals (2026)

Singles from Modern Rituals
- 1. "In the Corner" Released: 23 May 2025; 2. "Parallel Desire" Released: 27 February 2025; 3. "Go Lucky" Released: 26 February 2026; 4. "Rituals" Released: 12 June 2026; 5. "Maze" Released: 3 July 2026; 6. "In My Head" Released: 21 August 2026

Modern Rituals is the fourth studio album by Australian folk musician Celia Pavey (the third under the name Vera Blue). Announced in June 2026 alongside the single "Rituals", the album was released on 21 August 2026.

Pavey said "Each album I write, for me, is a form of healing. This album is more about awareness and looking at myself from a bird's eye view, without needing to fix or change anything. It's very much just about witnessing myself."

The album follows eight rituals and eight identities told through eight songs. It was supported by an Australian tour through August 2026.

== Track listing ==
Modern Rituals track listing
No.	Title	Writer(s)	Producer(s)	Length
1.	"Rituals"	Celia Pavey; Lachlan Bostock	Bostock	2:29
2.	"Brittle Wings"	Pavey; Alexandra Veltri; Tim Nelson; Bostock	TimFromTheHouse; Bostock	3:35
3.	"Maze"	Pavey; Natalie Dunn; Harley Streten; Jono Ma	Eric J Dubowsky; Josh Dubowsky^{[a]}	3:37
4.	"Go Lucky"	Pavey; Chris Collins; Ma	Ma; Collins; E. Dubowsky^{[a]}	3:36
5.	"Imprints"	Pavey; Dunn; Lionel Crasta	Crasta	3:08
6.	"In My Head"	Pavey; Kristin Carpenter; Nelson	TimFromTheHouse	3:14
7.	"In the Corner"	Pavey; Collins; Ma	Ma; Collins; E. Dubowsky^{[a]}	3:08
8.	"Parallel Desire"	Pavey; Lucy Healey	Upsidedownhead; E. Dubowsky; Healey; Pavey	2:40
Total length:				25:27

=== Note ===
- ^{^[a]} indicates an additional producer

== Personnel ==
Credits are adapted from the album's liner notes.

- Celia Pavey – vocals
- Eric J Dubowsky – mixing (all tracks), engineering (tracks 3–5, 7, 8); programming, keyboards (3, 7, 8); synthesizer (3)
- Dale Becker – mastering
- Katie Harvey – mastering assistance
- Kegn Venegas – mastering assistance
- Adam Burt – mastering assistance
- Lach Bostock – keyboards, programming, engineering (1, 2); piano (1)
- TimFromTheHouse – synthesizer, programming, drums, bass, engineering (2, 6)
- Alexandra Velltri – background vocals (2)
- Jono Ma – programming, keyboards, engineering (4, 7)
- Chris Collins – programming, keyboards, engineering (4, 7)
- Lionel Crasta – drums, guitar, bass, synthesizer, engineering (5)
- Jackson Rau – guitar (5)
- Ross James – programming, synthesizer, keyboards, engineering (8)
- Lucy Healey – programming, synthesizer, keyboards, engineering (8)
- Grey Ghost – creative direction
- Hemisphere – photography
- Casey Moore – photography
- Casey Skilbeck – photography assistance
- Alex Green Haigh – styling
- Ethan Bergersen – top design
- Audrey Rose – skirt design
- Dinosaur Designs – jewellery
- Kerri Gravina – hair
- Nadine Muller – make-up
- Connor Dewhurst – packaging design

== Charts ==
Chart performance for Modern Rituals
Chart (2026)	Peak position
Australian Albums (ARIA)	12
