= Portrait of Amelia Opie =

Painting by John Opie

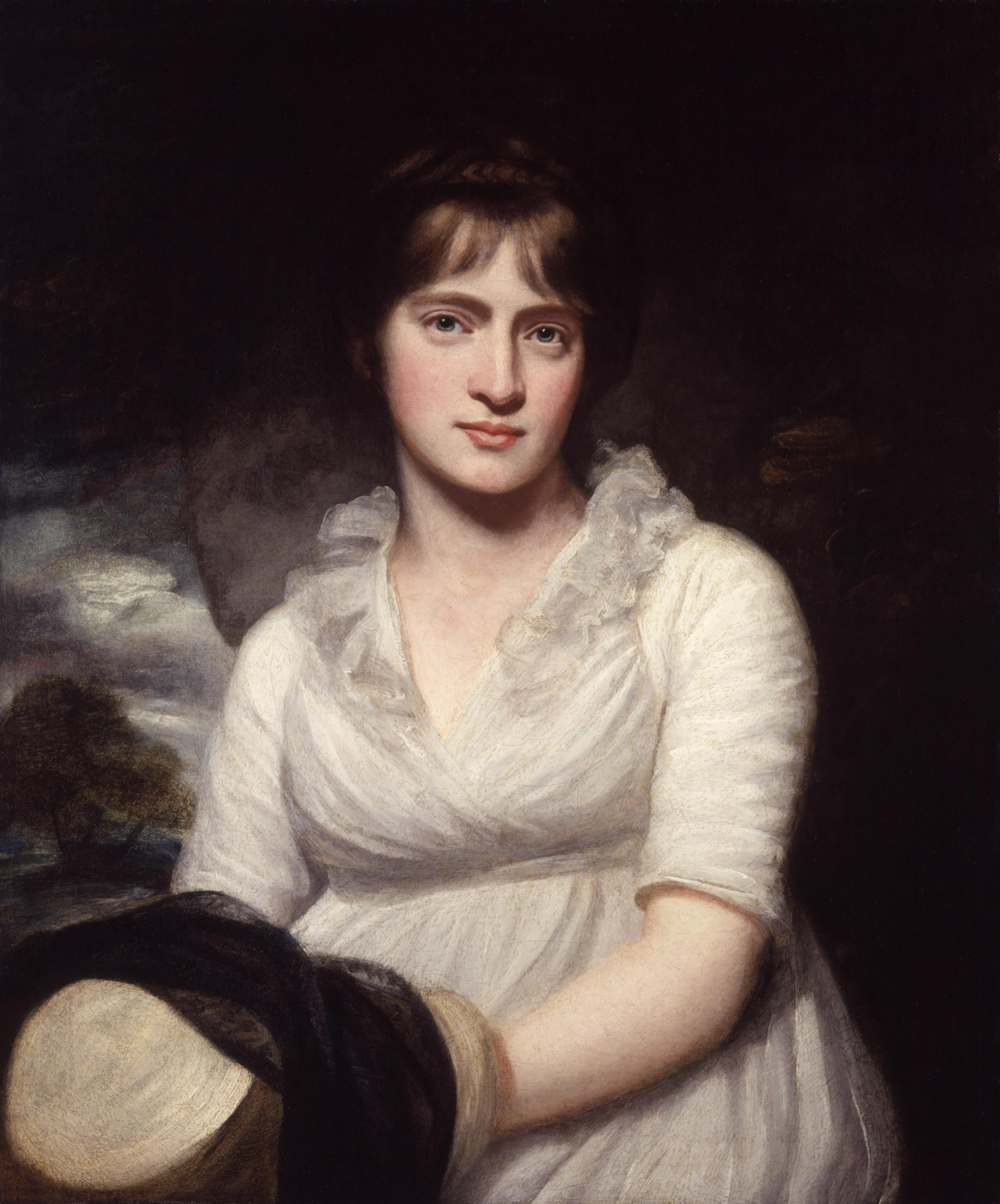
- Artist: John Opie
- Year: 1798
- Type: Oil on canvas, portrait
- Dimensions: 74.3 cm × 62.6 cm (29.3 in × 24.6 in)
- Location: National Portrait Gallery, London

Portrait of Amelia Opie is an oil on canvas portrait painting by the British artist John Opie, from 1798. It is a depiction of his wife, Amelia Opie, a noted writer and abolitionist.

== History and description ==
It was painted the year the couple married. She is shown at half-length, dressed in white, looking directly at the viewer, and with her straw hat in her hands. She is seated under a tree, and a landscape with another tree visible is shown at the left, in the background. After her husband's death, in 1807, Amelia became a quaker known for her role in good causes. It has been describe as "one the finest portraits of the era, rivalling in expression Reynolds' Sarah Siddons as the Tragic Muse".

Today the painting is in the collection of the National Portrait Gallery, in London, having been acquired in 1887.

== Bibliography ==
- Bray, Joe. The Portrait in Fiction of the Romantic Period. Routledge, 2016.
- Burwick, Frederick. A History of Romantic Literature. John Wiley & Sons, 2019.
- Walker, Richard John Boileau. Regency Portraits, Volume 1. National Portrait Gallery, 1985.
