= True Temper =

True Temper may refer to:

- True Temper, a lawn and garden tool manufacturer, now part of Ames True Temper
- True Temper Sports, a golf equipment manufacturer headquartered in Memphis, Tennessee
  - True Temper Foursomes Tournament, a 1939 golf tournament sponsored by the company
