= Music from the Home Front =

- Dates: 25 April 2020
- Location: Australia
- Years active: 2020
- Founders: Michael Gudinski
- Website: musicfromthehomefront.com.au

Music from the Home Front was a concert held across Australia and New Zealand on 25 April 2020, to pay tribute to the Australian and New Zealand Army Corps and workers at the frontline of the COVID-19 pandemic response. The concert was broadcast live on television by the Nine Network in Australia, Channel Three in New Zealand and YouTube internationally and run for 3 ½ hours.

The broadcast was viewed by 1.159 million Australians, with the show rating number 1 for under 40 year olds.

A compilation album of the same name was released by Bloodlines on 19 June 2020.

== Background ==
25 April is Anzac Day in Australia and New Zealand, a national day of remembrance, that traditionally is a day to attend the dawn service and attend or participate in the Anzac Day march to pay our respects to Australian and New Zealander service people who have served and/or died in all wars, but in particular those who fought at Gallipoli campaign in 1915. Due to the COVID-19 pandemic in 2020 and restrictions in place across Australia and New Zealand, no public gatherings were allowed.

In 2020, tourism promoter Michael Gudinski (from Mushroom Group and Frontier Touring Company) wanted to provide an event which was positive and uplifting during the time of isolation. 9 days prior to Anzac Day, Michael Gudinski spoke with Jimmy Barnes and the Victorian Premier, Daniel Andrews about the concept of a concert to pay respects to the Anzacs and to recognise the work that is being done by those on the frontline in the medical community during the Covid-19 pandemic, whereby musician performed songs while in isolation and raising awareness for Support Act, RSLs and RSAs.

The line-up of Australian and New Zealand artists performed a song from their homes, and it was then produced as a live concert and screened on Network 9 in Australia, Channel Three in New Zealand and YouTube internationally. The host for the evening was David Campbell and co-hosted by Christian O'Connell from Gold 104.3 and Australian musicians Delta Goodrem and Guy Sebastian.

Adrian Swift, Head of Content Production and Development at Network Nine said "Music from the Home Front is a salute from Australia and New Zealand's music communities to everyone serving our nations under lockdown. From the military this Anzac Day to all those on the frontline fighting COVID-19 and those working to keep food delivered, shelves stacked and streets cleaned. And it's an opportunity for everyone watching to say thanks too just by texting us as we go to air this very different Anzac Day."

== Funds raised ==
Unlike the special projects that have come before it, Music from the Home Front is not a telethon. Gudinski told The Industry Observer: "This is not contrived, we're going to dwell much more on the frontline workers and the Anzacs. The only fundraising element will be a commercial for Support Act and an ad for the frontline workers and hospital people. It's up to people to donate."

== Reception ==
=== Critical reception ===
Professional ratings
Review scores
Source	Rating
The Sydney Morning Herald	3.5/5 stars

Brodie Lancaster from The Guardian said: "With a three-hour runtime and multiple montages... the energy of the event often threatened to dip into an inescapably sombre place" continuing with "It's understandably hard to have fun when the message is one of sacrifice and loss, but sensitivity and vitality can co-exist, as proved by a few performers who cracked through the downcast mood." Lancaster said DMA's cover of "Better Be Home Soon" was a stand-out moment from the whole night.

James Jennings from The Sydney Morning Herald thought at times it veered a little too closely to a "Triple M Greatest Songs of All Time countdown" but the "decent smattering of newer artists' "freshened things up". Jennings said "As an event designed to lift spirits and remind us that we are all in this together, Music from the Home Front succeeds admirably. We may not have as many family members around us to faithfully belt out Australian classics such as "When the War Is Over", as Jimmy Barnes and his brood do at the event's conclusion, but at least there are now new ways for us to feel a little less lonely while sitting around the living room wondering what’s next."

=== Commercial reception ===
The concert was the most watched program of the night on Australia's free to air multi channels and subscription channels, and the fourth most watched program overall, peaking at 4.7 million viewers.

== Live album ==
Mushroom Group founder and record label executive Michael Gudinski confirmed the release of a live album on 29 May 2020. The album was released through Bloodlines on 19 June 2020.

Music from the Home Front debuted and peaked at number 1 on the ARIA Albums Chart. The album reached number 20 on the 2020 End of Year ARIA Top 100 Australian Albums Chart.
