= Temper (Drayden novel) =

2018 novel by Nicky Drayden

- First edition
- Author: Nicky Drayden
- Language: English
- Genre: Fantasy
- Set in: South Africa
- Publisher: Harper Voyager
- Publication date: 7 August 2018
- Publication place: South Africa
- Pages: 400 (first edition)
- ISBN: 978-0-06-249305-7
- Preceded by: The Prey of Gods

Temper is a 2018 speculative fiction novel by South African writer Nicky Drayden. It was published by Harper Voyager, an imprint of HarperCollins.

== Plot ==
Temper is set in a village in South Africa. It follows twins, Kasim and Auben, who were presumed to be born with different virtues and vices. Six vices for Auben and a vice for Kasim. It is presumed that Kasim should be more prosperous than the latter. As the novel progresses, the twins start to hear voices in their head which they later identify as the voices of the original twin gods; Icy Blue and Grace who had possessed each of the twins. They seek exorcism but in the long-run, allow the gods to take full possession of their bodies.

== Reception ==
Publishers Weekly reviewed that the author "takes speculative fiction in an exciting direction with a harrowing and impressive tale of twisted prophecy, identity, and cataclysmic change." Liz Bourke reviewing the book for Tor.com noted that Temper is "a novel that requires more from its readers than a more conventional SFF novel." due to its complexity. It also received a mixed review from Locus Magazine.
