= Mended (song) =

Single by Vera Blue

from the album Perennial
- Released: 26 May 2017
- Length: 5:05
- Label: Universal Music Australia
- Songwriter(s): Vera Blue, Andy and Thom Mak

Vera Blue singles chronology
"Private" (2017)	"Mended" (2017)	"Regular Touch" (2017)

Music video
- "Mended" on YouTube

"Mended" is a song by Australian singer songwriter, Vera Blue and was released on 26 May 2017 as the second single from her second studio album, Perennial (2017).

Blue told Triple J's Veronica & Lewis, "I was in a stage where I was thinking about past relationships and my co-writer Thom, [he] came up with the idea for the title. It reminded me of all the things I haven't said and people I haven't quite let go of... It's basically about not mending with someone and making up with them. Not necessarily getting back in a relationship but letting go of the pain and the hurt, saying sorry." In an interview with The Music AU, Blue added “It’s funny because you think the song is going to be about resolution, but we haven’t quite made it there yet.”

"Mended" was certified gold in 2019 and platinum in 2020.

== Music video ==
The music video was directed by Cloudy Rhodes and released on 14 June 2017. Rhodes said; "I wanted to make a film where we witness the triumph of a young woman rising-up to the experience of love. I wanted Vera to be the protagonist of the film who falls from the night sky, out of the darkness into the light - her falling is a metaphorical representation of ‘falling in love’. Mended to me is all as about the female experience and that's what I tried to convey through the visuals in this clip."

== Track listing ==
Digital download

No.	Title	Length
1.	"Mended"	5:05

== Charts ==
Chart (2017)	Peak position
Australia (ARIA)	96

== Certifications ==
Region	Certification	Certified units/sales
Australia (ARIA)	Platinum	70,000^{‡}
^{‡} Sales+streaming figures based on certification alone.

== Release history ==
Region	Date	Format(s)	Label
Australia	26 May 2017	Digital download	Universal Music Australia
