= Slumberjack =

Australian electronic music duo

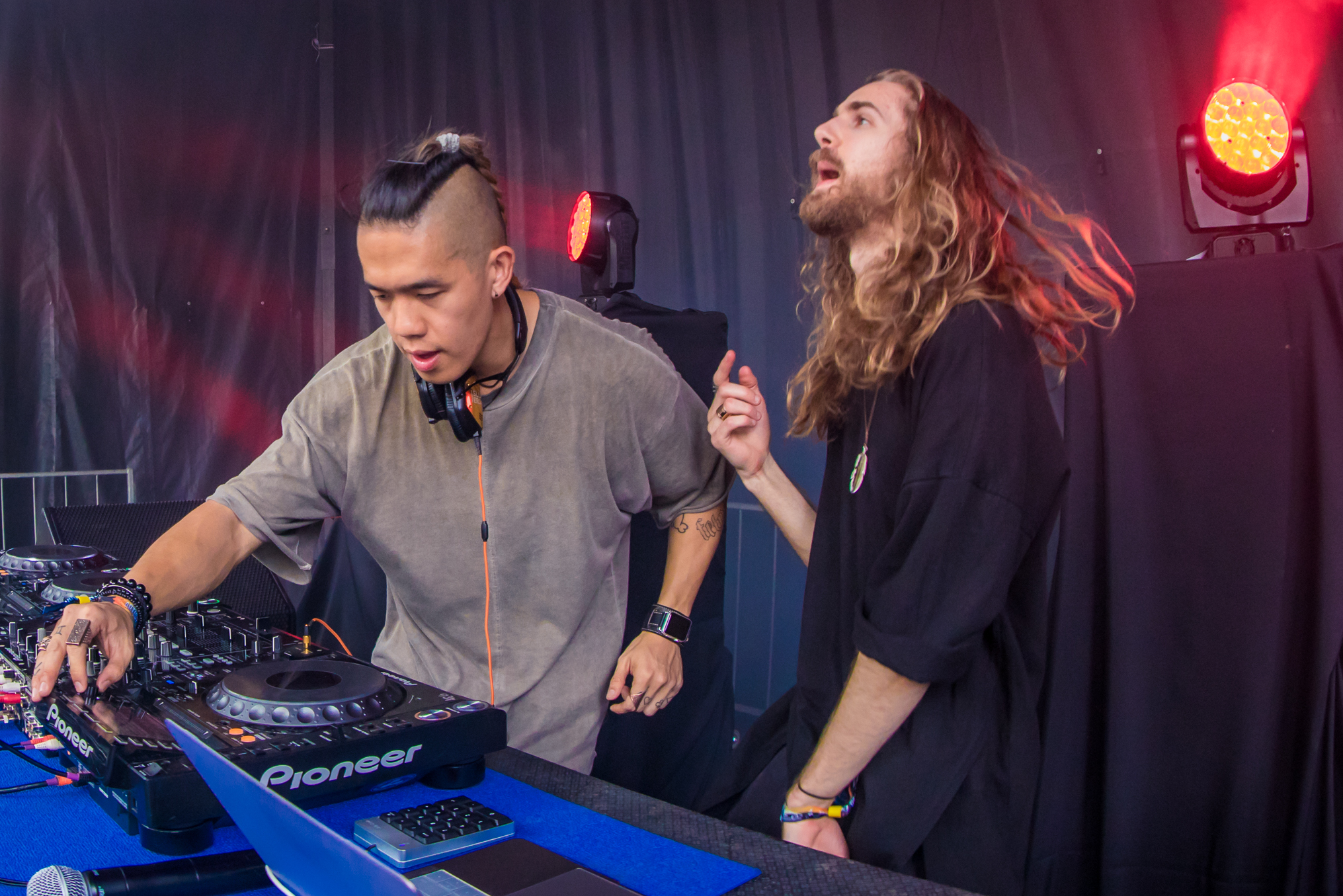
- Slumberjack performing in 2019

Background information
- Origin: Perth, Australia
- Genres: EDM
- Occupation: Record producers
- Years active: 2014–present
- Labels: Onelove Recordings; Mad Decent; Monstercat; Lowly Palace; Sweat It Out; Future Classic
- Members: Fletcher Ehlers; Morgan "Yee Sheng" Then

Slumberjack (stylised in all caps) is an Australian electronic music duo consisting of Morgan Then and Fletcher Ehlers. Their 2017 single, "Fracture", peaked at 89 on the ARIA Charts.

== Members ==
=== Morgan Then ===
Morgan Then was raised in Borneo, before moving to Perth for university. Then has had a long relationship with his love for music, growing up listening to world music and learning piano from his father from a young age.

=== Fletcher Ehlers ===
Ehlers was born in Perth, but moved with his close family and spent his early years to Vietnam before moving back to Perth ten years later. His parents were always fond of house music, which gave him an early appreciation for electronic music in general.

== Career ==
=== Creation of Slumberjack ===
Then and Ehlers met at a DJ competition in 2011, where they became familiar with one another's work. Ehlers won the competition in 2011 while Then won in 2012, and afterwards they found themselves hanging out as friends, which naturally led to hanging out in the studio. They had the opportunity to get in the studio with Mr Carmack, the day where things truly started to fall into place for Slumberjack. A few singles later, they had enough material for a debut EP which quickly received traction in Australia, as well as receiving ample support from Triple J, pushing Slumberjack to become a staple electronic artist.

=== 2013–2015: Debut ===
After meeting a year prior while at a DJ Competition, Then and Ehlers started working on music together, and it wasn't long before they found themselves in the studio working on new music alongside Mr Carmack. They released their self titled EP to critical acclaim, getting adds on Triple J and launching them into the mainstream early in their career. They spent their 2015 touring alongside Alison Wonderland, playing "secret warehouse shows" and any time not touring was spent working on new music.

=== 2016–2019: "Open Fire" to Sarawak ===
During this time, much of their work became collaborative, and they began linking with many different artists in preparation for their next EP Fracture. Working with artists like Vera Blue and Sydnee Carter, Fracture led to their first headlining tour, and the overall visual aesthetic of Slumberjack, mainly in their live shows, was developed throughout this time. In late 2017, they were invited to do a "triple j Like A Version" performance alongside K. Flay, where they played a cover of the song "Paper Planes" by M.I.A.

In 2018, Slumberjack began production on a new EP titled Sarawak, featuring another eclectic mix of collaborators including TroyBoi and Ekali. The release of SARAWAK in 2019 led to their most ambitious worldwide tour alongside fellow collaborators TroyBoi, Ekali, and Alison Wonderland.

=== 2020–present: Black & Blue to Dichotomy ===
Slumberjack kicked off 2020 with the EP "Black & Blue" featuring various collaborations with artists like Daktyl and FOMO. Around this time Slumberjack started releasing their "Distillation Mixes", pulling a mix of Slumberjack originals as well as some of their favorite tracks that's inspired their sound. The release of "Poison" featuring Sydnee Carter marked the first single as part of their first full-length album, "Dichotomy". Following "Poison", their next release was a double single titled "Memory" and "The Reprise". Shortly after, Slumberjack won Best Electronic Producer in the WAM Awards. "DICHOTOMY" is slated for release in late 2021.

== Discography ==
=== Studio albums ===
List of studio albums, with release date and label shown
Title	Album details
Dichotomy	Released: 28 January 2022; Label: Sweat It Out, Warner Music Australia; Format: LP, digital download, streaming

=== Extended plays ===
List of EPs, with release date, label, and certifications shown
Title	EP details	Certifications
Slumberjack	Released: 21 November 2014; Label: Onelove Recordings; Format: Digital download	ARIA: Gold
Fracture	Released: 13 April 2017; Label: Onelove Recordings, Mad Decent; Format: Digital download, streaming	
Sarawak	Released: 5 February 2019; Label: Onelove Recordings, Monstercat; Format: Digital download, streaming	
Black & Blue	Released: 21 February 2020; Label: Monstercat; Format: Digital download	

=== Singles ===
List of singles, with year released, selected chart positions and certifications, and album name shown
Title	Year	Peak chart positions		Certifications	Album
Title	Year	AUS	NZ Hot	Certifications	Album
"Naked" (with Alison Wonderland)	2015	—	—		Run
"Enigma"	2016	—	—		Back to Bass
"Fracture" (featuring Vera Blue)	2017	89	—	ARIA: Gold	Fracture
"Hollow" (with Krane)	2017	—	—		Fallout
"Vision" (with Quix featuring Josh Pan)	2017	—	—		Non-album singles
"Warlord" (with What So Not)	2018	—	—		Non-album singles
"Sometimes Love" (with Alison Wonderland)	2018	—	—		Awake (Remixes)
"Helios" (with Ekali)	2018	—	—		Crystal Eyes
"Daggers" (with Machine Age)	2018	—	—		Sarawak
"Solid" (with TroyBoi)	2018	—	—		Sarawak
"Crucified" (with Daktyl featuring Moonzz)	2019	—	—		Black & Blue
"Hades" (with Fomo)	2020	—	—		Black & Blue
"Inferno" (with Twerl, Loston, ShockOne and Hwls)	2020	—	—		Non-album singles
"Legend" (with Apashe featuring Wasiu)	2020	—	—		Non-album singles
"Surrender"	2020	—	—		Non-album singles
"Poison" (featuring Sydnee Carter)	2020	—	13		Dichotomy
"Better Off" (featuring Lucy Lucy)	2021	—	—		Dichotomy
"Pain" (featuring Josh Pan)	2021	—	—		Dichotomy
"Reptiles"	2023	—	—		TBA
"Bodymorph"	2023	—	—		TBA
"Uh Uh"	2023	—	—		TBA
"Python"	2023	—	—		TBA
"Scout"	2023	—	—		TBA
"Nostalgia" (featuring Little Green)	2023	—	—		TBA
"To Be Loved"	2024	—	—		TBA
"Back Again"	2024	—	—		TBA
"Swear You"	2024	—	—		

=== Remixes ===
List of remixes, with year released, artist(s), and album name shown
Title	Artist(s)	Year	Album
"Fellow Feeling"	Porter Robinson	2015	Worlds Remixed
"Time"	Alison Wonderland and Quix	2019	Non-album singles
"14U+14ME"	The Presets	2019	Non-album singles

== Awards and nominations ==
=== WAM Awards ===
The Western Australian Music Industry Awards (commonly known as WAMis) are annual awards presented to the local contemporary music industry, put on by the Western Australian Music Industry Association Inc (WAM).

Year	Nominee / work	Award	Result
2020	Slumberjack	Best Electronic Producer	Won

=== AIR Awards ===
The Australian Independent Record Awards (commonly known informally as AIR Awards) is an annual awards night to recognise, promote and celebrate the success of Australia's Independent Music sector.

Year	Nominee / work	Award	Result
2018	Fracture	Best Independent Dance/Electronic Album	Nominated

=== National Live Music Awards ===
The National Live Music Awards (NLMAs) commenced in 2016 to recognise contributions to the live music industry in Australia.

Year	Nominee / work	Award	Result	Ref.
2016	Slumberjack	Live Electronic Act (or DJ) of the Year	Nominated	
2023	Slumberjack	Best DJ/Electronic Act	Nominated	

=== Triple J Unearthed Awards ===
Australia's Listen Out award is given to 4 different artists each year, and offer the chance to perform at the Listen Out festival, which started in 2013.

Year	Nominee / work	Award	Result
2014	Themselves	Listen Out Winner	Won
