= The Way That You Love Me (Vera Blue song) =

Single by Vera Blue
- Released: 5 July 2019
- Length: 3:36
- Label: Island Records Australia / Universal Music Australia
- Songwriter(s): Vera Blue, Andy & Thom Mak

Vera Blue singles chronology
"Like I Remember You" (2019)	"The Way That You Love Me" (2019)	"Rushing Back" (2019)

Music video
- "The Way That You Love Me" on YouTube

"The Way That You Love Me" is a song by Australian singer songwriter Vera Blue, released in July 2019 as the third single from her forthcoming third studio album. Prior to the songs premier on Triple J Vera Blue said "It feels very different; A new phase, new story, new vibe for me.". She said "When you love someone in your life or someone loves you, whether its friendship, family, or a lover, sometimes you can treat that person badly and not realise it... It's a weird way of loving someone." Co-write Andy Mak said "Emotionally we wanted to create a sense of tension and unease, like something isn't quite right in the world. It felt right to support that with tough beats, dark synths, choirs."

The song has peaked at number 30 on the New Zealand Hot Singles chart.

== Reception ==
Laura English from Music Feeds said "It has a rushed tempo and an upbeat sound that's juxtaposed by dark lyrics" calling the song "catchy AF".

Nic Kelly from Project U described the song as "One of her most soaring choruses ever precedes a frenetic, cooked breakdown packed with sharp drums and dirty synths." calling it "extremely good."

== Music video ==
The music video was directed by Benn Jae and released on 26 August 2019. The clip features latex, whips, sleek black outfits, choreographed dancing, and near-naked men hanging suspended by rope from the ceiling and was filmed in Melbourne in a giant warehouse.

Vera Blue said "When I was writing this song I had a vision of the video already, wanting a really strong, tough and dark video that incorporated lots of dancers." adding "I grew up dancing so it was really nice to be able to express the feelings of this song with beautiful strong dancers and push my own boundaries a little. I loved working with so many different characters and personas in this video."

=== Video reception ===
Michael Di Iorio from Tone Deaf said "[the song] features a pulsating electronic beat that drives the entire song, as Vera and her fit-bodied dancers communicate a feminist narrative through the art of dance" adding "It really is something to behold".

== Release history ==
Region	Date	Format(s)	Label
Australia	5 July 2019	Digital download, streaming	Island Records Australia, Universal Music Australia
