= Lady Powers =

Single by Vera Blue featuring Kodie Shane

from the album Perennial
- Released: 2 March 2018
- Length: 3:12
- Label: Universal Music Australia
- Songwriter(s): Celia Pavey; Andrew Macken; Thomas Macken; Adam Anders

Vera Blue singles chronology
"Regular Touch" (2017)	"Lady Powers" (2018)	"All the Pretty Girls" (2018)

Music video
- "Lady Powers" on YouTube

"Lady Powers" is a song by Australian singer-songwriter, Vera Blue and is included on Vera Blue's second studio album, Perennial (2017). A remixed version of the song featuring American hip-hop singer Kodie Shane was released on 2 March 2018 as the album's fourth and final single.

Vera Blue said "Lady Powers" is "about not having to use your sexuality to be respected as a woman and to be able to feel comfortable in your own skin without having to change for someone while knowing who you are, your worth and your strength." adding "It's hard sometimes, especially when you feel vulnerable... As women we all have lady powers, but we shouldn't have to use them to feel wanted or respected. We need to respect ourselves. In doing that, we have true lady powers other than just our bodies."

Kodie Shane said she was "super excited" to be part of a song, saying "Feminism to me is nothing more and nothing less than the belief in equality for women. I personally feel a responsibility to demonstrate to that we girls have the power to not only gain equality for women but all sectors of society."

The song was promoted with a 'Lady Powers Tour' across Australia in May and June 2018.

"Lady Powers" was certified gold in Australia in 2019.

== Music video ==
The music video for "Lady Powers" was directed by Jesse Heath and released on 22 March 2018. Vera Blue said "It all went well, it was a great day. There was a lot of cool lighting, smoke machines, there were a couple of dancers, as well. There's quite a few powerful moments within the film clip that I'm really excited for people to see and feel. Overall, it was really fun!" Adding "It could have been easy to make an oppositional ’girls vs. boys’ video, but that would have done the song a great disservice. The girls in the video aren't performing for anyone except themselves and that's what makes them so powerful."

== Reception ==
Hayden Davies from Pile Rats said "On Vera Blue's debut album Perennial, "Lady Powers" stood out. With its bouncy, anthemic pop vibe, "Lady Powers" showcased Vera Blue's newfound dance-pop sound at its best, which is probably the reason why she's highlighting the single months later with a new remix featuring Atlanta hip-hop gem Kodie Shane." Sarah Bamford from Student Edge said "'Lady Powers' is one of those tracks that just wriggles its way into your ear and nests there." Fashion Journal called the song "a true feminine anthem." Amplify called the single "a killer".

== Track listings ==
Digital download

No.	Title	Length
1.	"Lady Powers"	3:12

Digital download

No.	Title	Length
1.	"Lady Powers" (Acoustic)	2:54

Digital download / Vinyl Record

No.	Title	Length
1.	"Lady Powers"	3:12
2.	"Lady Powers" (TOKiMONSTA remix)	3:33
3.	"Lady Powers" (Maya Jane Coles remix)	6:01
4.	"Lady Powers" (Alice Ivy remix)	4:11
5.	"Lady Powers" (Maria Marcus remix)	4:27
6.	"Lady Powers" (album version)	2:53

Digital download

No.	Title	Length
1.	"Lady Powers" (Slumberjack remix)	4:08

Digital download

No.	Title	Length
1.	"Lady Powers" (Mahogany Sessions)	2:55

== Certifications ==
Region	Certification	Certified units/sales
Australia (ARIA)	Gold	35,000^{‡}
^{‡} Sales+streaming figures based on certification alone.

== Release history ==
Region	Date	Format(s)	Label	Version
Australia	2 March 2018	Digital download, streaming	Universal Music Australia	Single version
Australia	8 March 2018	Digital download, streaming	Universal Music Australia	Acoustic version
Australia	13 April 2018	Digital download, streaming	Universal Music Australia	Remixes
Australia	22 June 2018	Digital download, streaming	Universal Music Australia	SlumberJack remix
Australia	5 April 2019	Digital download, streaming	Universal Music Australia	Mahogany Sessions
