= Temper, or, Domestic Scenes =

Temper, or, Domestic Scenes is a three-volume novel by Amelia Opie that was published in 1812 and 1813. It explores issues concerning mother-daughter relationships, female education, and the unfairness of patriarchal marriage customs.

Opie set part of the novel in Paris (which she had visited in 1802), where her characters take what is 'tantamount to a tourist trip around places of revolutionary bloodshed'.

== Synopsis ==
Temper follows the instruction of its heroine, Emma. She is the daughter of Agatha Torrington, and the granddaughter of Emma Castlemain. Opie criticizes both Agatha and the older Emma for not correctly educating their daughters. Agatha's own lax education is partly responsible for her unwise marriage to George Danvers. He turns out to be a libertine, who deserts her and their daughter Emma.

Agatha tries to get proof that her marriage was lawful, but the relevant page has been torn out of the marriage register. As a result, Emma is potentially illegitimate.

Emma later becomes the ward of a clergyman, Mr. Egerton, who provides her with an appropriate education. She and Henry St Aubyn fall in love, and he is finally able to prove that Emma is legitimate. After this revelation, he and Emma marry.

== Reception ==
In the novel, Opie cited William Hayley's popular poem The Triumphs of Temper. This sparked a long and friendly correspondence between Opie and Hayley, which lasted until his death in 1820.

Temper has one of Opie's more optimistic endings: Emma is the first of her heroines not to die tragically.
