= Bodies (EP) =

Australian extended play

EP by Celia Pavey
- Released: 29 August 2014
- Genre: Pop rock; indie rock
- Length: 15:42
- Label: Universal, Mercury
- Producer: Eric J. Dubowsky

Celia Pavey chronology
This Music (2013)	Bodies (2014)	Fingertips (2016)

Singles from Bodies
- 1. "Red" Released: 25 August 2014

Bodies is the debut extended play (EP) by Australian pop rock singer-songwriter, Celia Pavey. It was announced on 4 August 2014, along with a tour of Australia's east coast. The four-track EP was released on 29 August 2014 via Universal Music Australia. In an interview, Pavey reflected, "I'm a very honest person so I like to write about real things that are happening in my life rather than make up stories. I write a lot about the people in my life. Most of my songs are about love or the habits people share." Chart analyst Gavin Ryan predicted the EP would reach the Australian ARIA top 40 albums chart, however it did not.

== Review ==
Riley Ackley, the Promotional Director for The Oswegonian, gave the EP 4.5 out of 5, and explained "[it] is a beautiful four track debut. Focusing heavily on acoustics and Pavey's angel-like melodies, each song off of Bodies will carry listeners into a day dream trance." adding, "Overall, [it] is near perfection. As an EP, its glossy set-up paired with Pavey's celestial voice makes it one of the most prominent EP releases of the year. [Her work] is proof that there is more to be done in the folk-singer-songwriter genre. Other artists beware, because they'll soon pale in comparison."

Venue operator, Lizotte's advertiser wrote, "This studio introduction to Celia's honest and adventurous folk songwriting sweeps through that flat, ghostly landscape and into sonically lush territory" adding "[she] sings of young loss and desire with a voice that has already captured international attention." In a review of the EP and its live tour, Chloe Webb of Reverb Magazine said "Pavey has truly found her place musically, a meticulous combination of rambling folk and easy listening indie-pop."

== Track listing ==
Bodies (EP) – Universal Music Australia (3792865)
No.	Title	Writer(s)	Length
1.	"Bodies"	Danielle Blakey, Alexandra Hosking, Celia Pavey, Jake Stone	3:20
2.	"Shadow"	Tim Hart, Hugo Levingston, Pavey	3:42
3.	"Red"	Pavey	4:38
4.	"Laura"	Natasha Khan, Justin Parker	4:02

== Release history ==
Region	Date	Format(s)	Label
Australia	29 August 2014	Digital download	Universal Music Australia
