= Like I Remember You =

Single by Vera Blue
- Released: 8 February 2019
- Length: 3:06
- Label: Island Records Australia / Universal Music Australia
- Songwriter(s): Vera Blue; Julia Stone; Andy Mak; Thom Macken
- Producer(s): Andy Mak

Vera Blue singles chronology
"All the Pretty Girls" (2018)	"Like I Remember You" (2019)	"The Way That You Love Me" (2019)

Music video
- "Like I Remember You" on YouTube

"Like I Remember You" is a song by Australian singer songwriter Vera Blue, released as a standalone single on 8 February 2019 via Island Records Australia and Universal Music Australia.

The song was released in conjunction with Greenpeace, to raise awareness to the 'People Vs Oil' campaign; a campaign focusing on protecting the Great Australian Bight from oil drilling. Vera Blue said she's doing it "...for the love of our oceans."

Vera Blue said "I was shocked when I found out that oil drilling is going to happen off Australia's southern coast, in the Great Australian Bight... The beaches of my childhood could end up covered in oil, and the thriving animals in this incredible stretch of ocean would be done for... It's no use this magical place just being a memory we tell our grandkids about: we need to protect it, now, while we still have it. We need to keep the Great Australian Bight like we remember it."

The music video was directed by Nicholas Colla and released on 7 February 2019 and features clips of Greenpeace activists on board Rainbow Warrior with powerful signage protesting oil, clips of the reef, and of Vera Blue dancing along to the track.

== Reception ==
Laura English of Music Feeds said "The song has that same dreamy kind of sound that flows through most of Vera Blue's discography."

== Track listing ==
Digital download

No.	Title	Length
1.	"Like I Remember You"	3:08

== Certifications ==
Region	Certification	Certified units/sales
Australia (ARIA)	Gold	35,000^{‡}
^{‡} Sales+streaming figures based on certification alone.

== Credits and personnel ==
Credits adapted from Spotify.

- Celia Pavey – vocals, writing
- Andy Mak – writing, production
- Julia Stone – writing
- Thom Macken – writing
