= Dangers of Coquetry =

Amelia Opie's first published novel

Dangers of Coquetry is Amelia Opie's first published novel, and deals with issues of female sexuality and the social construction of gender. It was published anonymously in 1790.

== Synopsis ==
The novel follows the life of Louisa Conolly, a woman who enjoys flirting ('coquetry'). After she marries Henry Mortimer, she continues to flirt with other men. This causes her husband considerable anxiety, although Louisa remains physically faithful to him.

Whilst Louisa is pregnant, Henry fights in a duel to defend her reputation. He is fatally wounded, and the shock causes Louisa to give birth prematurely. Henry and Louisa's child is born dead, and Louisa herself also dies shortly afterwards.

== Reception ==
The Dangers of Coquetry attracted little attention when it was first published.

Although the novel cautions readers about the dangers of flirting, Opie also depicted Louisa as a flawed yet ultimately sympathetic figure. One contemporary reviewer was far more critical of Henry's behaviour than hers, writing that: 'while it [the novel] attributes the most mischievous and dreadful consequences to a little innocent coquetry in the character of a wife, it shews them to have proceeded from an idle, ridiculous, and unfounded jealousy on the part of her husband. Teresa Pershing suggests that although Opie portrays Louisa as an example of failed femininity, she also shows that society's narrow notions of acceptable female behaviour are flawed.

The novel uses some standard tropes found in 'coquette narratives' written at the time (particularly in that the coquette dies tragically), but is also unusual in that Louisa is married. Pershing argues that Dangers of Coquetry therefore "reveals marriage’s inability to contain emotional and erotic desire".
