= Tempers =

American synth-pop duo

- Origin: New York City, U.S.
- Genres: Indie pop; synth pop; darkwave
- Years active: 2013–present
- Labels: aufnahme + wiedergabe; BMG; Dais Records; fear of luxury
- Publisher: Mute Song
- Members: Jasmine Golestaneh
- Past members: Eddie Cooper
- Website: tempersmusic.com

Tempers is a synthpop and indie darkwave project based in New York. It was founded in 2013 by singer and songwriter Jasmine Golestaneh.

The project initially consisted of Golestaneh and Eddie Cooper. As a duo, Tempers released the studio albums Services, Private Life, and New Meaning, as well as Junkspace, a collaborative work featuring architect Rem Koolhaas.

The fourth album, Delusion, was released on April 24, 2026 and was co-produced by Golestaneh and Jorge Elbrecht.

== Career ==
=== 2013-2015: Formation and initial success ===
Jasmine Golestaneh is of Latvian-Iranian descent and was born in Florida, United States. Golestaneh grew up in Europe before moving to New York. Eddie Cooper is originally from New York City, and prior to the duo's collaboration had lived and worked in Berlin. Cooper released music on electronic record labels including !K7 and Eskimo. The duo began recording music together in 2013. They released the single "Strange Harvest" in 2013 on the Pendu Sound record label. Ian Cohen of Pitchfork described Tempers as having a coldwave sound, and wrote "[...] within its four minutes, the slow burn of "Strange Harvest" reaches a point of self-immolation".

Tempers first full-length studio album, Services, was released in 2015 on the German record label aufnahme + wiedergabe. "Strange Harvest" was included as a single for Services. The album was popular in Europe, and gained the duo a European and UK following. When recording, they used the Moog Opus 3 on tracks like "Summer is Gone" and the acoustic version of "Strange Harvest".

In 2016, they played at the Volcano Extravaganza festival on the island of Stromboli.

The duo released a five-track EP Fundamental Fantasy, on the British record label The Vinyl Factory, on 24 February 2017. The duo recorded much of Fundamental Fantasy through improvisation, and Cooper said in an interview for Wonderland Magazine that "a lot of the melodies and chord progressions came out of live improvisation, so the songs already had their colours and characters defined before we even got into the arrangement and production". "Further" was released as the lead single for the EP and in a review by David Graver for Cool Hunting it was described as "thoughtful" and "complex songwriting".

In 2017, Tempers played at SXSW in Austin, Texas and toured Europe in the summer.

=== 2018-2019: Breakthrough with Private Life ===
In 2018, Tempers released the concept album Junkspace, featuring Dutch architect Rem Koolhaas which is set in a shopping mall. Junkspace used samples from interviews with Koolhass to comment on the architecture of consumerism. Cooper and Golestaneh have said that the album was intended to critique shopping malls as manufactured places of "fantasy" that can psycholigically manipulate to spend money.

Tempers were signed to the label Dais Records in 2019, and their second full-length studio album Private Life was released on October 25, 2019. They began writing the album in 2017. A review by Rich Wilhelm from PopMatters is generally positive and Wilhelm writes that "the album should appeal both to old school and new school synthpop fans". Writing for Slug Magazine, Bianca Velasquez gave a favourable review and said "listening to Private Life was a pleasant journey through a story of loneliness and despair".

=== 2020-2022: New Meaning and growing popularity ===
Following the release of Private Life, Tempers announced a UK and European tour in 2020. They began the tour with a headline show at London's Moth Club on 28 February 2020.

In December 2020, Tempers re-released Services under Dais Records, making it available in the United States and internationally.

Tempers' third full-length studio album New Meaning was released in 2022 on the record label Dais Records. The songs were written by Golestaneh and she has said she was influenced by the uncertainty of the COVID-19 pandemic.

== Discography ==
=== Studio albums ===
Services

- Released: 2015
- Format: CD
- Label: aufnahme + wiedergabe (2015)
- Producer: Tempers
- Singles: "Strange Harvest", "Undoing"

Junkspace

- Released: 2018
- Format: CD
- Label: BMG (2015)
- Producer: Katja Eichinger, Jasmine Golestaneh and Edward Cooper
- Singles: "Strange Harvest", "Undoing"

Private Life

- Released: 2019
- Format: CD
- Label: Dais Records
- Producer: Jasmine Golestaneh and Edward Cooper
- Singles: "Capital Pains"

New Meaning

- Released: 2022
- Format: CD
- Label: Dais Records
- Producer: Tempers
