= This Music =

Studio album by Celia Pavey
- Released: 12 July 2013
- Genre: Folk
- Labels: Universal Music Australia, Mercury

Celia Pavey chronology
This Music (2013)	Bodies (EP) (2014)

This Music is the debut studio album by Australian singer-songwriter Vera Blue. It was released in July 2013 and peaked at number 14 on the ARIA Charts.

== Background and release ==
In 2013 Pavey auditioned for The Voice Australia and was mentored by Delta Goodrem. In June she became the second runner-up behind Harrison Craig and Luke Kennedy. She was signed to Universal Music Australia immediately following the show and recorded an album featuring songs Pavey had performed on the show along with "a couple of extras".

"Believe Me" was released as the first official single from the album on 5 July but failed to impact the Australian singles chart.

In an interview with Cream in August 2013 Pavey responded to the question of recording original material; "It was good fun doing covers, and cover work is really good for artists to practise, but I was really excited to get one of my own compositions on there. And I can't wait to do more of that."

== Critical reception ==
A staff writer at news.com.au gave the album 3 out of 5 stars, saying "Her 'Scarborough Fair' is enchanting and her incredible version of Joni Mitchell's 'Woodstock' would surely have got her a record deal with or without a hit TV show." They were more critical of "Xanadu", saying she had "suck[ed] all the fun out of [it]" with her cover, but concluded by saying they hoped Pavey would "see the world" and make the album she wants to make.

== Track listing ==
No.	Title	Length
1.	"Scarborough Fair/ Canticle" (Simon & Garfunkel song)	2:27
2.	"A Thousand Years" (Christina Perri song)	3:03
3.	"Woodstock" (Joni Mitchell song)	4:21
4.	"Jolene" (Dolly Parton song)	3:25
5.	"Edelweiss" (The Sound of Music song)	2:22
6.	"Will You Still Love Me Tomorrow" (The Shirelles' song)	2:56
7.	"Xanadu" (Olivia Newton-John song)	3:38
8.	"Candle in the Night" (original [written by Pavey])	4:16
9.	"Believe Me" (Ellie Goulding song)	4:33
10.	"Feel Good Inc." (Gorillaz song)	4:09
11.	"Moonshadow" (Cat Stevens' song)	2:51

== Charts ==
Chart (2013)	Peak position
Australian Albums (ARIA)	14

== Release history ==
Country	Date	Format	Label	Catalogue
Australia	12 July 2013	CD, digital download	Universal Music Australia	3743763
