= All the Pretty Girls (Vera Blue song) =

Single by Vera Blue
- Released: 26 October 2018
- Length: 3:22
- Label: Island Records Australia / Universal Music Australia

Vera Blue singles chronology
"Lady Powers" (2018)	"All the Pretty Girls" (2018)	"Like I Remember You" (2019)

Music video
- "All the Pretty Girls" on YouTube

"All the Pretty Girls" is a song by Australian singer songwriter Vera Blue, released in October 2018. The music video was directed by Jared Daperis and released on 29 November 2018. "All the Pretty Girls" was certified platinum in Australia in January 2020.

Upon release, Vera Blue told Triple J that she channelled Fleetwood Mac while writing the tune in Los Angeles adding "It's a cheeky play on stereotypes; the whole idea of judging a book by its cover. It's kind of cruel and not really my vibe, but when you like someone or attracted to someone you're like 'ooh, ok that person looks like they're a player-heartbreaker; makes all the girls cry'. All the pretty girls meaning all girls in general because all girls are pretty."

== Reception ==
Al Newstead from Triple J called the song a "summery single that continues the empowerment messaging of 'Lady Powers'". Matthew Kent from The Line of Best Fit said "'All the Pretty Girls' merges a folk-inspired innoncence [sic] and naiveté that is masked by the crescendo of modern influences that come into play." adding "the dreamy, guitar-strum-led production plays off against Blue's crystalline vocals."

== Track listing ==
Digital download

No.	Title	Length
1.	"All the Pretty Girls"	3:22

No.	Title	Length
1.	"All the Pretty Girls" (Mahogany Sessions)	3:26

== Charts ==
Chart (2018/19)	Peak position
Australia (ARIA)	82

== Certifications ==
Region	Certification	Certified units/sales
Australia (ARIA)	Platinum	70,000^{‡}
^{‡} Sales+streaming figures based on certification alone.

== Release history ==
Region	Date	Format(s)	Label	Version
Australia	26 October 2018	Digital download, streaming	Universal Music Australia	Single
Australia	31 January 2019	Digital download, streaming	Universal Music Australia	Mahogany Sessions
