= Fingertips (EP) =

EP by Vera Blue
- Released: 13 May 2016
- Recorded: 2015–2016
- Studio: The Grove Studios, Sydney and Josh Telford's home studio in Terrigal
- Genre: Folk; indie pop
- Length: 19:00
- Label: Universal Music Australia
- Producer: Andy Mak

Vera Blue chronology
Bodies (2014)	Fingertips (2016)	Perennial (2017)

Singles from Fingertips
- 1. "Hold" Released: 19 November 2015; 2. "Settle" Released: 11 March 2016

Fingertips is an extended play by Australian folk musician Vera Blue. It is the first EP released under this name as she released previous music under her birth name Celia Pavey. It was released on 13 May 2016.

Upon release Blue said; "I've always wanted to create something that's a blend of folk and cool, heavy, thick sounds. This is the music I have been wanting to make and I feel like I'm unleashing."

Vera Blue promoted the album by supporting Matt Corby on his Telluric tour and Broods on their Australian tour in July 2016.

== Reviews ==
Professional ratings
Review scores
Source	Rating
Renowned for Sound	4.5/5 stars
The Music	4/5 stars

Haydon Benfield from Renowned for Sound thought Fingertips was a more adult release than 2013's This Music and 2014's Bodies, with the maturity being felt in both the music and lyrical content. Benfield said "with Fingertips, Vera Blue has exhibited a burgeoning maturity and artistry... there are still a few kinks to iron out, a few blends to perfect but, with the current direction that is being pursued, it is all but fait accompli that results will be breathtaking."

Carly Hall from The Music AU said; "Thank goodness the Sydney alternative folkster didn't stray down that more commercial path because her sultry, haunting EP would never have sounded as good or as interesting."

A review at Mushroom said the EP was "a swirling cocktail of lush electronica and fierce songwriting." adding "the result is an honestly raw and fiery body of work with the purity of folk music and the punch of a bassline."

== Track listing ==
No.	Title	Writer(s)	Producer(s)	Length
1.	"Hold"	Celia Pavey; Andrew Macken; Thomas Macken; Helen Croome	Andy Mak	4:06
2.	"Settle"	Pavey; A. Macken; T. Macken; Croome	Mak	3:38
3.	"Fingertips"	A. Macken; T. Macken; Croome	Mak	3:16
4.	"Turn"	Pavey; A. Macken	Mak	3:39
5.	"Patterns"	Pavey; A. Macken; T. Macken	Mak	4:02
Total length:				19:00

== Charts ==
Chart (2016)	Peak position
Australia (ARIA)	72

== Release history ==
Region	Date	Format(s)	Label
Australia	13 May 2016	Digital download	Universal Music Australia
