= Private (Vera Blue song) =

Single by Vera Blue

from the album Perennial
- Released: 17 February 2017
- Length: 2:29
- Label: Universal Music Australia
- Songwriter(s): Andrew Macken, Thomas Macken, Vera Blue

Vera Blue singles chronology
"Fracture" (2017)	"Private" (2017)	"Mended" (2017)

Music video
- "Private" on YouTube

"Private" is a song by Australian singer songwriter Vera Blue, released on 17 February 2017 as the lead single from her second studio album, Perennial (2017). "Private" was certified gold in Australia in 2020.

Vera Blue told Triple J the song was written in April 2016 and is about "that fantasy of wanting someone you can't have… I find that's something everyone can relate to. There's that frustration from not being able to have something whether you fall for a friend or a celebrity..."

== Reception ==
In a review of Perennial, Jessica Dale from The Music AU said "It’s short and sharp at two and half minutes. It’s a view into Pavey’s own fantasy world, playing on the concept of what she wants in her dreams verses what she knows is right in her reality."

== Track listing ==
Digital download

No.	Title	Length
1.	"Private"	2:29

== Charts ==
Chart (2017)	Peak position
Australia (ARIA)	84

== Certifications ==
Region	Certification	Certified units/sales
Australia (ARIA)	Gold	35,000^{‡}
^{‡} Sales+streaming figures based on certification alone.

== Release history ==
Region	Date	Format(s)	Label
Australia	17 February 2017	Digital download	Universal Music Australia
