= Regular Touch =

- Vice Remix cover

Single by Vera Blue

from the album Perennial
- Released: 14 July 2017
- Length: 3:28
- Label: Universal Music Australia
- Songwriter(s): Celia Pavey; Andrew Macken; Thomas Macken; Adam Anders; Helen Croome

Vera Blue singles chronology
"Mended" (2017)	"Regular Touch" (2017)	"Lady Powers" (2018)

Music video
- "Regular Touch" on YouTube

"Regular Touch" is a song by Australian singer songwriter, Vera Blue and was released on 14 July 2017 as the third single from her second studio album, Perennial (2017).

Blue told Triple J "I had this vision of myself feeling free from the chains of heartbreak and needing someone, anyone to feel complete and of purpose. The most incredible thing about this song is that it's exactly how I feel right now in my life. So free and happy within my own skin, focused and independent." adding "It's okay to be without someone's 'Regular Touch'. I've developed a sense of self love rather than constantly needing attention and affection, 'loving' for happiness."

A Vice Remix was released on 10 November 2017.

The single peaked at No. 97 on the ARIA singles chart, and was listed at No. 15 on the Triple J Hottest 100, 2017. By December 2018 it had appeared on the ARIA Hitseekers Singles top 20 for 44 weeks.

"Regular Touch" was certified platinum in Australia in 2019 and double platinum in January 2020.

== Music video ==
The music video for "Regular Touch" was filmed in Cardrona, New Zealand, directed by Benn Jae and released on 31 October 2017.

== Reception ==
Project U said "It sounds sorta like an Astrid S moment" adding it has a "big, electronic singalong chorus and some divine intricacies in every verse".

Al Newstead from Australian Broadcasting Corporation described the song as a "Flume-y electronic twists and synth pads frame [while] her platinum pipes in a song about achieving a sense of contentment in the wake of a rough romance."

In a review of Perennial, Jessica Dale from The Music AU said "Drawing on some Avicii-type vibes, it’s easy to hear that this will go on to be one of the biggest Vera Blue hits to date."

== Track listing ==
Digital download

No.	Title	Length
1.	"Regular Touch"	3:28

Digital download (Vice Remix)

No.	Title	Length
1.	"Regular Touch"	4:04

== Charts ==
Chart (2017)	Peak position
Australia (ARIA)	97

== Certifications ==
Region	Certification	Certified units/sales
Australia (ARIA)	2× Platinum	140,000^{‡}
New Zealand (RMNZ)	Gold	15,000^{‡}
^{‡} Sales+streaming figures based on certification alone.

== Release history ==
Region	Date	Format(s)	Label	Version
Australia	14 July 2017	Digital download, streaming	Universal Music Australia	Album version
Australia	10 November 2017	Digital download, streaming	Universal Music Australia	Vice Remix
