= Hold (song) =

Single by Vera Blue

from the album Fingertips
- Released: 18 September 2015
- Recorded: 2015
- Genre: Alternative music, pop
- Length: 4:08
- Label: Universal Music Australia
- Songwriters: Celia Pavey, Andrew Macken, Thomas Macken, Helen Croome
- Producer: Andy Mak

Vera Blue singles chronology
"Red" (2014)	"Hold" (2015)	"Settle" (2016)

Music video
- "Hold" on YouTube

"Hold" is a song by Australian singer songwriter, Vera Blue. This was her first single released under the name Vera Blue, as she'd previously released songs under her birth name, Celia Pavey. "Hold" was released on 18 September 2015 and peaked at number 62 on the Australian ARIA Chart in March 2016 and at number 5 on the US Spotify viral top 50 chart.

Upon release, Vera Blue said; “This song is about finding someone who pulls you out of a dark place. It’s about when you’ve opened your heart so many times to people and you finally find that person who is there to protect you, to look after you, even when you’ve hurt them and they’ve hurt you. You never give up on them.”

A black and white music video was released on 19 November 2015 to promote the single. It was directed by Pete Foley & Laura Nagy.

The single was certified gold in 2017 and platinum in 2018.

== Track listing ==
Digital download

No.	Title	Length
1.	"Hold"	4:08

Remix digital download

No.	Title	Length
1.	"Hold (Black Vanilla remix)"	4:29

== Charts ==
Chart (2016)	Peak position
Australia (ARIA)	62

== Certifications ==
Region	Certification	Certified units/sales
Australia (ARIA)	Platinum	70,000^{‡}
^{‡} Sales+streaming figures based on certification alone.

== Release history ==
Region	Date	Edition	Format(s)	Label
Australia	18 September 2015	Standard	Digital download	Universal Music Australia
Australia	26 February 2016	Black Vanilla Remix	Digital download	Universal Music Australia
