= Settle (Vera Blue song) =

Single by Vera Blue

from the album Fingertips
- Released: 11 March 2016
- Length: 3:40
- Label: Universal Music Australia
- Songwriters: Andrew Macken, Thomas Macken, Helen Croome
- Producer: Andy Mak

Vera Blue singles chronology
"Hold" (2015)	"Settle" (2016)	"Papercuts" (2016)

Music video
- "Settle" on YouTube

"Settle" is a song by Australian singer songwriter, Vera Blue and was released on 11 March 2016. and peaked at number 79 on the Australian ARIA Chart in April 2016.

A black-and-white music video was released on 3 March 2016.

== Review ==
Mike Wass from Idolator said the song was "dark and brooding" and "Melancholy piano propels the song along with delicate synths merely adding depth and texture."

== Track listing ==
Digital download

No.	Title	Length
1.	"Settle"	3:40

== Charts ==
Chart (2016)	Peak position
Australia (ARIA)	79

== Certifications ==
Region	Certification	Certified units/sales
Australia (ARIA)	Platinum	70,000^{‡}
^{‡} Sales+streaming figures based on certification alone.

== Release history ==
Region	Date	Format(s)	Label
Australia	11 March 2016	Digital download	Universal Music Australia
