= Vera Blue =

Australian singer-songwriter

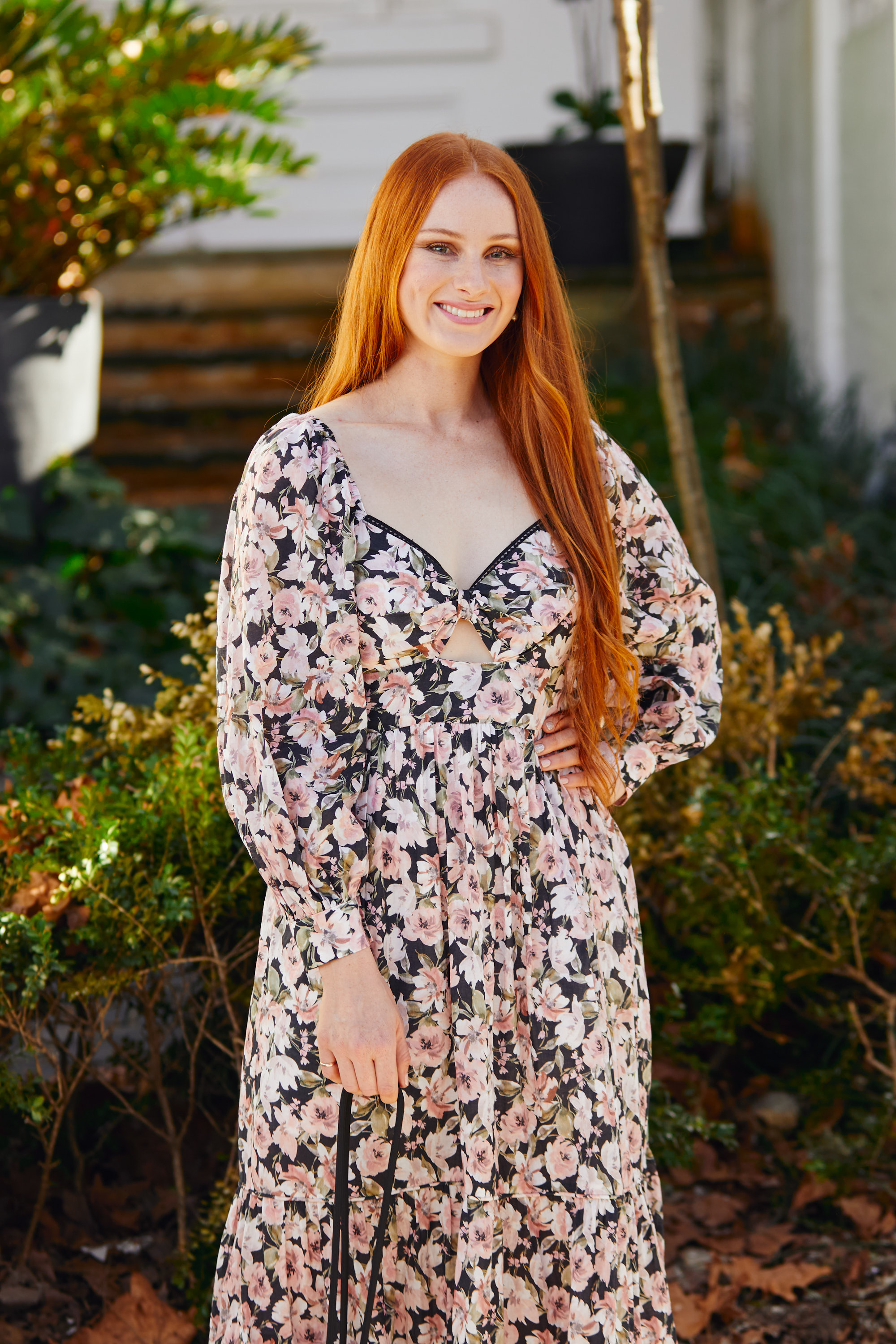
- Vera Blue at Australian Fashion Week 2021

Background information
- Born: Celia Pavey; January 23, 1994 (age 32); Forbes, New South Wales, Australia
- Genres: Folk; electronica; electropop
- Instruments: Vocals; violin; guitar
- Years active: 2012–present
- Label: Island Records Australia
- Spouse: William Johnston (married 2026-present)
- Website: verablue.com

Celia Pavey, known professionally as Vera Blue, is an Australian singer-songwriter known for her novel fusion of folk and synth pop music. She first rose to popularity as a contestant on season 2 of The Voice Australia. Her folk-inspired album This Music, was released under her birth-name and peaked at number 14 on the Australian ARIA Charts in July 2013. After assuming the name Vera Blue, her debut album Perennial achieved Gold certification in Australia in 2017. Two more studio albums have followed, along with collaborations with prominent Australian and USA-based artists and producers such as Flume, Illenium, Louis the Child and the hip hop artist, Illy. Pavey sings, dances and plays the guitar, violin and EWI.

== Career ==
=== 2013–2014: Celia Pavey, The Voice and This Music ===
During the 2013 season of The Voice Australia, Pavey auditioned while playing the guitar and received acclaim from the judges and audience. Her first audition clip of Simon & Garfunkel's "Scarborough Fair / Canticle" has amassed over 14 million views online. She joined Team Delta and placed third in the competition.

Round	Song	Original artist	Order	Result
The Blind Auditions	"Scarborough Fair"	Simon & Garfunkel	4	All judges offered to coach Pavey chose to join Team Delta
Battle Rounds	"A Thousand Years" (vs. Anna Weatherup)	Christina Perri	1	Saved by Delta
The Showdowns	"Woodstock"	Joni Mitchell	1	Saved by public
Live Finals 1	"Jolene"	Dolly Parton	10	Saved by public
Live Finals 2	"Edelweiss"	The Sound Of Music	7	Saved by public
Live Finals 3	"Will You Love Me Tomorrow"	Carole King	8	Saved by public
Semi-finals	"Xanadu"	Olivia Newton-John and Electric Light Orchestra	1	Advanced
Semi-finals	"Candle in the Night"	Celia Pavey	10	Advanced
Grand Final	"You're the Voice" (with Celia Pavey, Danny Ross and Luke Kennedy)	John Farnham	1	3rd place
Grand Final	"Go Your Own Way" (with Delta Goodrem)	Fleetwood Mac	5	3rd place

Following The Voice, Pavey released her debut studio album This Music in July 2013, which peaked at number 14 in Australia. Her debut EP Bodies followed on 29 August 2014, produced by Eric J. Dubowsky. Pavey toured the east coast of Australia in support of the EP.

=== 2015–2017: Vera Blue, Fingertips and Perennial ===
In August 2015, Pavey announced that she would be releasing music under the name Vera Blue. Her first EP under her new alias, Fingertips, was released on 13 May 2016. It features five tracks, including the two singles "Hold" and "Settle". In 2016, she was featured on the Australian hip hop artist Illy's song "Papercuts", which peaked at number two on the ARIA singles chart. Her single "Hold" peaked at number 5 on the US Spotify viral top 50 chart and number 1 on the Australian Viral 50 chart. In February 2017, Vera Blue released "Private". In June 2017, Vera Blue announced the release of her second studio album, Perennial. The album was released in July and peaked at number 6 on the ARIA Charts. Her song "Regular Touch" placed at number 15 on triple j's 2017 Hottest 100.

=== 2018–2021: "All the Pretty Girls" and "Like I Remember You" ===
On 26 October 2018, Vera Blue released the single "All The Pretty Girls" after premiering the song a day earlier on the Australian radio station Triple J. She also released the live album Lady Powers Live at the Forum. In February 2019, Vera Blue released "Like I Remember You" in partnership with Greenpeace. Describing her involvement, Celia stated "I'm lending my voice to the campaign to stop oil drilling in the Great Australian Bight – for the love of our oceans... I feel a deep connection to our oceans and I know that the seafloor is no place for risky oil drilling".

=== 2022–present: Mercurial and Modern Rituals ===
Vera Blue's second album (and Pavey's third overall), Mercurial, was released on 28 October 2022. It was preceded by the single "The Curse".

In May 2025, Vera Blue released "In the Corner", her first single in three years.

In September 2025, Vera Blue performed the national anthem at the AFL Grand Final

In July 2026, Vera Blue performed a sold-out concert with the Melbourne Symphony Orchestra and conductor Leonard Weiss.

Vera Blue's third studio album Modern Rituals was released on 21 August 2026, preceded by the singles "Parallel Desire", "In the Corner", "Go Lucky" and "Rituals". When interviewed about the album, she listed Madonna, Enya and Bjork as sources of inspiration.

== Touring ==
Vera Blue performs during her Modern Rituals tour, 2026

Vera Blue supported Conrad Sewell on his Australian tour September 2015. In April and May 2016 Vera Blue supported Matt Corby on his Telluric tour. In July 2016 Vera Blue supported Broods on their Australian tour.

Vera Blue's own Australian headline Fingertips tour concluded in May 2016, with all 8 dates around the country sold out. Vera Blue's second headline tour ran August through October 2016, reaching metropolitan and regional cities.

Vera Blue supported Flume at the 2016 Splendour in the Grass Festival, performing his number one hit Never Be Like You.

The 'Private' Tour was announced on 16 February 2017 and toured Australia in support of her released single, "Private". After the rising popularity of March 2018 single "Lady Powers", Vera Blue set off on her biggest Australian tour, titled 'Lady Powers' in March and June 2018.

Vera Blue performed as the headliner at the RMIT Graduation ceremony in 2023 hosted at Marvel Stadium.

She also appeared at the Big Chill Festival in Armidale, New South Wales, Australia, in May 2025.

== Discography ==
- This Music (2013) (as Celia Pavey)
- Perennial (2017)
- Mercurial (2022)
- Modern Rituals (2026)

== Awards and nominations ==
=== AIR Awards ===
The Australian Independent Record Awards (commonly known informally as AIR Awards) is an annual awards night to recognise, promote and celebrate the success of Australia's Independent Music sector.

Year	Nominee / work	Award	Result
2020	"Rushing Back" (with Flume)	Best Independent Dance, Electronica or Club Single	Nominated

=== APRA Awards ===
The APRA Awards are several award ceremonies run in Australia by the Australasian Performing Right Association (APRA) to recognise composing and song writing skills, sales and airplay performance by its members annually.

Year	Nominee / work	Award	Result	Ref.
2018	"Mended" (Andrew Macken, Thomas Macken, Samuel Telford, Celia Pavey, Adam Anders)	Song of the Year	Shortlisted	
2020	"Rushing Back" (Harley Streten, Celia Pavey, Sophie Cates, Eric Dubowsky) (with Flume)	Song of the Year	Shortlisted	
2021	"Rushing Back" (Harley Streten, Celia Pavey, Eric Dubowsky, Sophie Cates) (with Flume)	Most Performed Australian Work	Nominated	
2021	"Rushing Back" (Harley Streten, Celia Pavey, Eric Dubowsky, Sophie Cates) (with Flume)	Most Performed Dance Work	Won	

=== ARIA Music Awards ===
The ARIA Music Awards are annual awards, which recognises excellence, innovation, and achievement across all genres of Australian music.

Year	Nominee / work	Award	Result
2020	"Rushing Back" (with Flume)	ARIA Award for Best Dance Release	Nominated
2020	"Rushing Back" (with Flume)	Song of the Year	Nominated

=== Electronic Dance Music Awards ===
The Electronic Dance Music Awards (also known as the EDMAs) is an annual music award show focusing on electronic dance music.

Year	Award	Nominee / work	Category	Result	Ref.
2024	Electronic Dance Music Awards	Herself	Vocalist Of The Year	Nominated	

=== J Award ===
The J Awards are an annual series of Australian music awards that were established by the Australian Broadcasting Corporation's youth-focused radio station Triple J. They commenced in 2005.

Year	Nominee / work	Award	Result
2017	Perennial	Australian Album of the Year	Nominated

=== MTV Europe Music Awards ===
The MTV Europe Music Awards is an award presented by Viacom International Media Networks to honour artists and music in pop culture.

Year	Nominee / work	Award	Result
2017	herself	Best Australian Act	Nominated

=== National Live Music Awards ===
The National Live Music Awards (NLMAs) commenced in 2016 to recognise contributions to the live music industry in Australia.

Year	Nominee / work	Award	Result	Ref.
2017	Vera Blue	Live Voice of the Year	Nominated	
2017	Vera Blue	Best New Act of the Year	Nominated	
2017	Vera Blue	Best Live Voice of the Year – People's Choice	Nominated	
2023	Nathan Dagostino, Nicholas Beachen and Rachael Johnston (Vera Blue)	Best Stage & Light Design	Nominated	
2023	Vera Blue	Best Pop Act	Nominated	
2023	Vera Blue	Live Voice in NSW	Won	
