= Diplomatic Immunity (Client Liaison album) =

Studio album by Client Liaison
- Released: 4 November 2016 (Australia); 17 November 2017 (worldwide)
- Recorded: Melbourne, Australia
- Genres: Electronic pop; Indie pop; new wave; synth-pop
- Length: 51:50
- Labels: Dot Dash Recordings, Remote Control, Inertia
- Producers: Client Liaison; Flight Facilities; Dann Hume; George Hewitt; Lionel Towers; Ben Plant

Client Liaison chronology
Client Liaison (2014)	Diplomatic Immunity (2016)	Divine Intervention (2021)

Singles from Diplomatic Immunity
- 1. "World of Our Love" Released: 19 April 2016; 2. "Wild Life" Released: 19 August 2016; 3. "Off White Limousine" Released: 20 March 2017; 4. "A Foreign Affair" Released: 30 August 2017

Diplomatic Immunity is the debut studio album by Australian indie pop duo Client Liaison, released independently and exclusively in Australia on 4 November 2016. It was eventually re-released worldwide and onto digital streaming platforms on 17 November 2017.

== Background ==
Since entering the Australian music scene with breakthrough single "End of the Earth" in 2012, Monte Morgan and Harvey Miller (a.k.a. Client Liaison) have attracted a fawning following with their catchy songs, camp choreography, flamboyant costumes and poker-faced skewering of 1980s Australian culture and excess. The group released a self-titled extended play in 2014 and have continued to perform live.

In an interview with Cameron Adams from the Herald Sun, Client Liaison explained why they think their genuine love of 1980s and early 1990s music may make some feel they're less credible or serious. "Why don't people who are into rock music [...] get asked what it is about those decades they're so interested in? No one ever questions why people make rock music. We feel the same way about the eras we take from, the '80s and early '90s, where our interests in music were born, those synthesisers and palettes of sound. And why is it not a gimmick to wear tight rocker jeans and a rockabilly hat but it is to wear acid wash jeans and a suit? I'd argue those people are further stuck in the past than we are."

== Reception ==
Professional ratings
Review scores
Source	Rating
The Guardian	4/5 stars
Herald Sun	3/5 stars
Rolling Stone Australia	4/5 stars
Tone Deaf	9/10 stars
auspOp	5/5 stars

Shaun Prescott from The Guardian gave the album 4 out of 5 and wrote: "On their long-awaited debut, the Melbourne act meld silky 1980s dance pop with nostalgic Australiana – as long as you don’t overthink it", adding "Client Liaison is capable of producing very beautiful pop music, suffused with a powerful combination of dancefloor vigour and bittersweet nostalgia."

Annabel Ross from Rolling Stone Australia gave the album 4 out of 5, saying "The album is finally here, and it sees vocalist Monte Morgan and producer Harvey Miller continue their ridiculous romp through Eighties-era excess; see the George Michael grunt of "Off White Limousine" and sublime electro-ballad "Hotel Stay" – in a vibrant Ken Done canvas of Prince-inspired pop, Eurobeats and the odd didgeridoo. "Canberra Won't Be Calling Tonight", an ode to diplomatic immunity, looks set to become the unlikely refrain of the summer, and Tina Arena makes an inspired cameo with a wink at the "Sorrento Moon"."

Kyle Butcher from Tone Deaf gave the album 9 out of 10 and said "Canberra Won't Be Calling Tonight" is "easily one of the highlights... and it lays out the album’s eclectic mixture of modern electro-pop with 1980s disco". Butcher summarised the album by writing "Diplomatic Immunity sees Client Liaison offer a comprehensive list of songs that perfectly encapsulate everything the duo are about."

Zanda Wilson from Music Feeds wrote "[while] there are plenty of songs that sound a lot like previous tracks... it’s the subject material that differs and is significant", adding "In saying that, it's not as if Diplomatic Immunity isn't a diverse record. It definitely is, and songs like the bass heavy 1990s style techno track "Do It My Way" and the funk-pop inspired "Off White Limousine" shows off the ability of Client Liaison to craft songs in unexpected ways. "Where Do We Belong" even has a killer horn riff throughout."

Ross also wrote another review of the album for The Sydney Morning Herald, stating "Diplomatic Immunity is every bit as ridiculous and glorious as their fans could hope for."

David from auspOp website gave the album 5 out of 5 saying; "With Client Liaison’s debut album Diplomatic Immunity, you’re transported right back to the 1980s; into a world full of layered synths, echoey vocals and shoulder pads." adding "From start to finish, the boys don’t put a foot wrong."

== Track listing ==
No.	Title	Writer(s)	Producer(s)	Length
1.	"Canberra Won't Be Calling Tonight"	Harvey Miller; Monte Morgan	Client Liaison	5:22
2.	"Wild Life"	Miller; Morgan; George Hewitt	Client Liaison; Hewitt^{[b]}	4:36
3.	"A Foreign Affair" (featuring Tina Arena)	Miller; Morgan	Client Liaison	4:21
4.	"Off White Limousine"	Miller; Morgan; Daniel Benjamin Cobbe; Benjamin McIldowie	Client Liaison; Dann Hume	4:35
5.	"World of Our Love"	Miller; Morgan	Client Liaison; Flight Facilities	4:30
6.	"Hotel Stay"	Miller; Morgan	Client Liaison	4:44
7.	"Where Do We Belong"	Miller; Morgan; Benjamin Plant	Plant; Client Liaison^{[b]}	4:13
8.	"The Bravest Beginnings"	Miller; Morgan	Client Liaison	5:37
9.	"Home"	Miller; Morgan; Lionel Towers	Client Liaison; Towers	4:40
10.	"Do It My Way"	Miller; Morgan	Client Liaison	4:08
11.	"Electric Eyes"	Miller; Morgan; Hewitt	Client Liaison	5:04
Total length:				51:50

Notes

- [b] signifies an additional producer.
- "World of Our Love" samples "Love Sensation" by Loleatta Holloway.
- "Off White Limousine" features backing vocals from Mr. Hudson.
- "Home" features backing vocals from Sarah Carr.
- "Electric Eyes" features backing vocals from George Hewitt.

== Charts ==
Chart (2016)	Peak position
Australian Albums (ARIA)	15

== Release history ==
Region	Date	Format(s)	Label	Catalogue
Australia	4 November 2016	Digital download, CD	Dot Dash Recordings / Remote Control / Inertia	DASH043CD
