= Client Liaison =

Australian indie pop duo

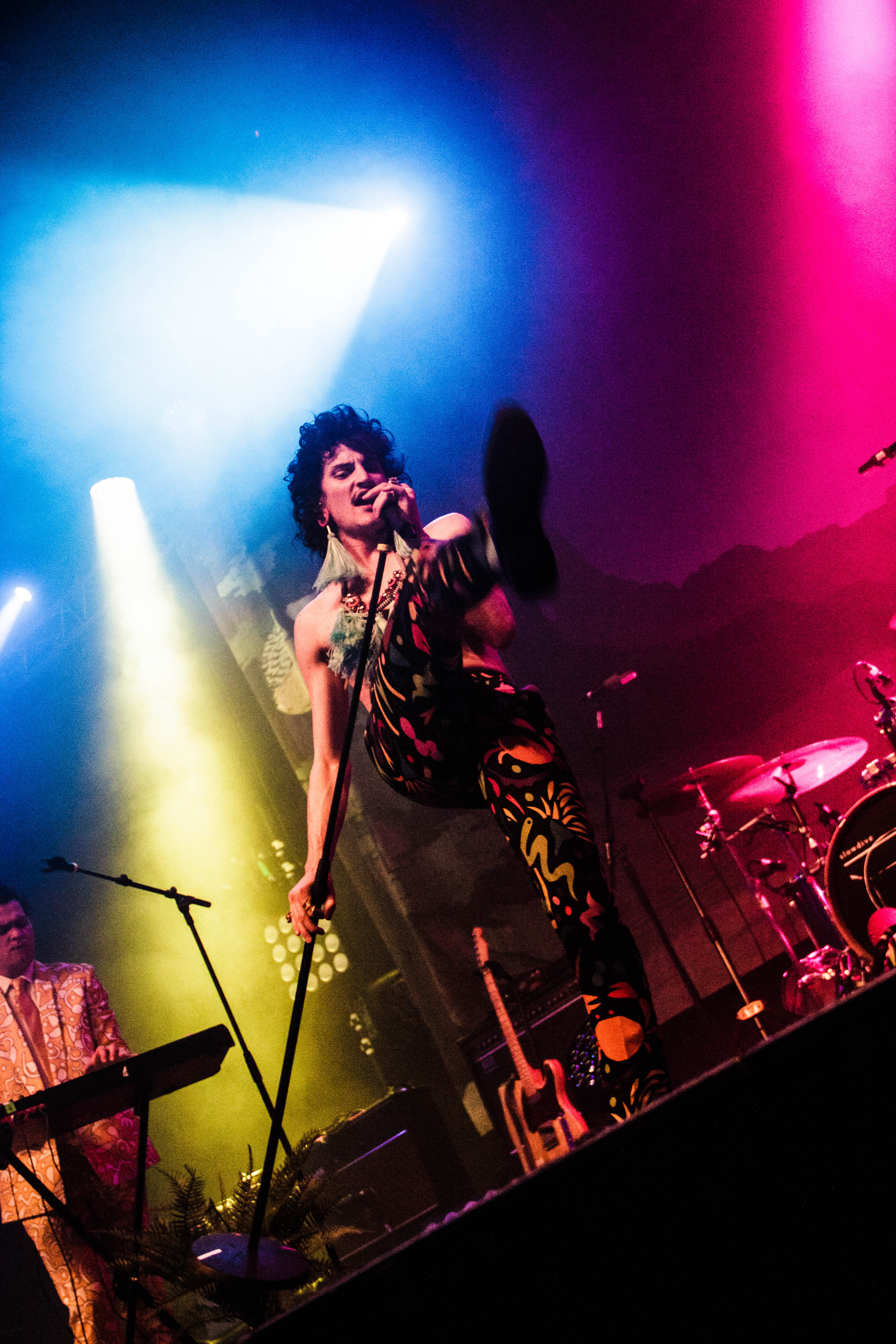
- Client Liaison performing at WayBackWhen Festival in 2017

Background information
- Origin: Melbourne, Australia
- Genres: Electronic, indie pop
- Years active: 2009–present
- Labels: Dot Dash Recordings (2009–present); Parlophone (2018–present)
- Members: Monte Morgan; Harvey Miller
- Website: http://www.clientliaison.com

Client Liaison are an Australian indie pop duo made up of vocalist Monte Morgan, and keyboardist and producer Harvey Miller. The pair first came to prominence in 2012 after the release of their first music video "End of the Earth", and went on to release a self-titled EP in 2014, and studio album Diplomatic Immunity in 2016. Their second studio album, Divine Intervention was released on 1 October 2021.

== Background ==
=== Origins ===
Client Liaison was formed in Melbourne in 2009 by former Geelong Grammar schoolmates Monte Morgan (born 1985) and Harvey Miller (born 22 May 1988).

Influenced by late '80s and early '90s electronic and house music, the pair produces a style of music described by them as "faux-fi", and incorporate a similar 1980s Australia theme into their personas. As part of this image, the pair draw a wide range of Australian references into their performances and music videos, and often make reference to brands such Ansett, Foster's, and Diners Club, and have named Tina Arena and John Farnham as being amongst the many influences on their music.

When performing live, the duo expands to include Miller's brother Geordie Miller on guitar and saxophone, and former Triple J Hack presenter (2011-2019) Tom Tilley, whom Miller had met through a previous girlfriend, on bass.

Both Monte and Harvey attended the private Geelong Grammar School. The former is the son of executive-chairman of Roy Morgan Research, Gary Morgan, the latter is the son of director George T. Miller. The duo bases themselves in a Collins Street office space owned by Morgan's father's company.

Morgan studied general arts at the University of Melbourne. Miller, who studied fine arts at the Victorian College of the Arts, frequently uses the postnominal AO after his name, describing himself as a "self-appointed" member of the Order of Australia — he is not, in reality, a member.

=== 2012–2016: Client Liaison ===
In mid-2012, Client Liaison released the music video for "End of the Earth", a song Morgan had written five years prior during a time when he was "angry with Australia" and its culture cringe. The video, featuring the pair in '80s pop clothing performing in front of a montage of iconic Australian clips, became a cult hit on YouTube.

It was not until over a year later, on 29 August 2014, that the duo released their first EP, eponymously titled Client Liaison. The music video for the single "Queen" was filmed on a VHS camcorder and made reference to the clip for the Womack and Womack song "Teardrops".

The pair played their first national tour as a support act for Miami Horror, and later went on to support Flight Facilities on their national and international tours.

At the 2014 J Awards, the duo were nominated for best music video for their song "Free of Fear" but lost to "Chandelier" by Sia.

=== 2016–2017: Diplomatic Immunity ===
Client Liaison's first studio album Diplomatic Immunity was released on 4 November 2016. The pair described the theme of the album as being of them as "diplomats flying the Australian flag, taking Australia to the world". The duo collaborated with Cleopold, Flight Facilities and Tina Arena while producing the album. The music video for "Wild Life", the album's second single, makes references to Qintex, the former company run by businessman-turned-fugitive Christopher Skase. The album's fourth single, "A Foreign Affair", features Tina Arena and makes reference to her 1995 song Sorrento Moon. As part of the release of the album, Client Liaison announced that in place of ordinary band merchandise they would be releasing a line of clothing named the "Client Liaison: Deluxe Line" with the assistance of stylist Kirsty Barros.

The pair performed at Firefly Music Festival, Splendour in the Grass, and Secret Garden Festival in 2015, Groovin' the Moo and The Falls Music and Arts Festival in 2016, and Field Day in 2017. The band commenced a world tour titled "A Foreign Affair" in August 2017. In November, the group won Australian Music Video of the Year at the 2017 J Awards for "A Foreign Affair", which was directed by Tim White.

=== 2018–present: Divine Intervention ===
In May 2018, Client Liaison released "Survival in the City".

In August 2019, Client Liaison released "The Real Thing", and confirmed they are working on a second studio album. In November 2019, Client Liaison released "Champagne Affection". In June 2021, Client Liaison announced the released of their second studio album Divine Intervention, released on 1 October 2021.

Divine Intervention became the band's first ARIA top ten album, debuting at number 7.

== Discography ==
=== Albums ===
Title	Details	Peak
Title	Details	AUS
Diplomatic Immunity	Release date: 4 November 2016; Label: Dot Dash, Remote Control; Formats: Digital download, CD	15
Divine Intervention	Release date: 1 October 2021; Label: Warner; Formats: Digital download, CD	7

=== EPs ===
Title	Details	Peak
Title	Details	AUS
Client Liaison	Release date: 5 September 2014; Label: Dot Dash; Format: Digital download	76

=== Singles ===
==== As lead artist ====
List of singles, with selected chart positions and certifications, showing year released and album name
Title	Year	Peak chart positions		Certification	Album
Title	Year	AUS	AUS Indie	Certification	Album
"End of the Earth"	2012	—	—		Client Liaison
"Free of Fear"	2014	—	—		Non-album singles
"That's Desire"	2014	—	—		Non-album singles
"Queen"	2014	—	—		Client Liaison
"Feed the Rhythm"	2014	—	—		Client Liaison
"Groove the Physical"	2014	—	—		Client Liaison
"Pretty Lovers"	2015	—	—		Client Liaison
"Evolution" (with Gypsy and the Cat)	2015	—	—		Hearts a Gun
"World of Our Love"	2016	196	7	ARIA: Gold	Diplomatic Immunity
"Wild Life"	2016	—	—		Diplomatic Immunity
"Off White Limousine"	2017	—	9		Diplomatic Immunity
"A Foreign Affair" (featuring Tina Arena)	2017	—	—		Diplomatic Immunity
"Survival in the City"	2018	—	—		Non-album single
"The Real Thing"	2019	—	—		Divine Intervention
"The Beat Supreme"	2019	—	—		Divine Intervention
"Champagne Affection"	2019	—	—		Divine Intervention
"Intervention"	2020	—	—		Divine Intervention
"House of Holy"	2021	—	—		Divine Intervention
"Elevator Up"	2021	—	—		Divine Intervention
"Strictly Business"	2021	—	—		Divine Intervention

==== Remixes ====
- "Cruel", The Preatures (June 2015)
- "90s Music", Kimbra (August 2014)
- "Rain", Retiree (February 2014)
- "Oh Innocence", Dúné (March 2013)

== Awards and nominations ==
=== AIR Awards ===
The Australian Independent Record Awards (commonly known informally as AIR Awards) is an annual awards night to recognise, promote and celebrate the success of Australia's Independent Music sector.

Year	Nominee / work	Award	Result	Ref.
2015	Client Liaison	Breakthrough Independent Artist	Nominated	

=== ARIA Music Awards ===
The ARIA Music Awards is an annual awards ceremony that recognises excellence, innovation, and achievement across all genres of Australian music. They commenced in 1987.

Year	Nominee / work	Award	Result	Ref.
2017	Tim White (for Client Liaison featuring Tina Arena) - "A Foreign Affair"	Best Video	Nominated	
2017	Tobias Willis and Zachary Bradtke for Client Liaison - "Off White Limousine"	Best Video	Nominated	
2018	David Porte Beckefeld (for Client Liaison) - "Survival in the City"	Best Video	Nominated	

=== J Award ===
The J Awards are an annual series of Australian music awards that were established by the Australian Broadcasting Corporation's youth-focused radio station Triple J. They commenced in 2005.

Year	Nominee / work	Award	Result
2014	"Free of Fear"	Australian Video of the Year	Nominated
2017	"A Foreign Affair" (with Tina Arena)	Australian Video of the Year	Won

=== Music Victoria Awards ===
The Music Victoria Awards, are an annual awards night celebrating Victorian music. They commenced in 2005.

Year	Nominee / work	Award	Result
2013	Best Electronic Act	Music Victoria Awards	Nominated
2014	Best Electronic Act	Music Victoria Awards	Nominated
2014	Best Emerging Artist	Music Victoria Awards	Nominated
2014	Best Band	Music Victoria Awards	Nominated
2016	Best Electronic Act	Music Victoria Awards	Nominated
2017	Best Electronic Act	Music Victoria Awards	Won

=== National Live Music Awards ===
The National Live Music Awards (NLMAs) are a broad recognition of Australia's diverse live industry, celebrating the success of the Australian live scene. The awards commenced in 2016.

Year	Nominee / work	Award	Result
2016	Tom Tilley (Client Liaison)	Live Bassist of the Year	Nominated
2017	themselves	Live Act of the Year	Nominated
2017	themselves	Live Pop Act of the Year	Won
2017	themselves	People's Choice - Live Act of the Year	Nominated
2017	Tom Tilley (Client Liaison)	Live Bassist of the Year	Nominated
