= Ballroom (disambiguation) =

A ballroom is a large room inside a building, the primary purpose of which is holding large formal parties called balls.

Ballroom, ball room, etc. may also refer to:

- Ballroom, a house music subgenre, associated with ballroom culture
- Ballroom dance, dance style commonly called simply "ballroom"
- Ballroom (musical), a 1978 Broadway musical
- The Ballroom, 2007 Brazilian-French romantic drama
- "Ballroom", a 2018 song by Jack River from Sugar Mountain
- Burn the Ballroom, an American alternative rock band
- Ballroom culture, an African-American LGBTQ+ subculture
- The White House Ballroom
