= A Foreign Affair (song) =

- Digital artwork

Single by Client Liaison featuring Tina Arena

from the album Diplomatic Immunity
- Released: 30 August 2017
- Recorded: 2016
- Length: 4:21
- Label: Client Liaison
- Songwriters: Harvey Miller; Monte Morgan
- Producer: Client Liaison

Client Liaison singles chronology
| "Off White Limousine" (2017) | "A Foreign Affair" (2017) | "Survival in the City" (2018) |

Tina Arena singles chronology
| "Chains" (2015) | "A Foreign Affair" (2017) | "Tant que tu es là" (2017) |

Music video
- "A Foreign Affair" on YouTube

"A Foreign Affair" is a song written and produced by Australian group Client Liaison, featuring Tina Arena. The song was released on 30 August 2017 as the fourth and final single from Client Liaison's debut studio album Diplomatic Immunity (2016). At the J Awards of 2017, the music video of song, directed by Tim White, won the Australian Music Video of the Year.

== Background and production ==
Band member Monte Morgan told The West Australian it was during the writing of the song Tina Arena's "Sorrento Moon" was referenced with the lyric "as we kiss on the beach of Sorrento". "We developed the song and it had her style in it; the early 90s power ballad vibe". Morgan said he originally sang the entire song solo, but parts were "out of his register". Morgan has acknowledged that Client Liaison are "huge fans" of Arena and stated "Our manager actually reached out to her management and she came in and smashed it out in one take".

In July 2017, the group announced the A Foreign Affair World Tour, which began in August 2017. In July 2017, Client Liaison were performing at Splendour in the Grass when Arena joined them on stage for a surprise performance of "Sorento Moon".

The song includes a lyrical allusion to Arena's own hit single "Sorrento Moon".

== Release ==
"A Foreign Affair" was released as a single on 30 August 2017 as the fourth and as the fourth and final single from Client Liaison's debut studio album Diplomatic Immunity (2016). A music video for the track was filmed the following week.

== Music video ==
The music video for the song was directed by Tim White and released on 29 August 2017.

The video includes references to Australia's former second airline Ansett Australia, which collapsed in 2001, in a tribute to the '80s sounds and looks that influence their style.

== Reception ==
=== Song ===
Kyle Butcher from Tone Deaf wrote about the song "Soft balladry casts the song back into the mid-1980s synth-pop that bred artists like Eurogliders and Pseudo Echo, offering a chance for the melody and lyrics to tell the tale of a mile high foreign affair".

Mushroom said "["A Foreign Affair" is] a sexy track saturated in '80s tropes. From the thick dance beat with that classic gated reverb to edgy bass synths and swirling synth pads, this song is everything you thought you'd never hear in 2017 – and it works". Zoë Radas from Stack magazine called the song "the best track" on the album.

=== Video ===
Zoë Radas from Stack magazine said the video is "sumptuous, hilarious and glowingly nostalgic all at once." Lucinda Price from Pedestrian said the video is "cinematically stunning".

The video was nominated for Best Video at the ARIA Music Awards of 2017, losing out to "Moments" by Bliss n Eso.

At the J Awards of 2017, the song won the Australian Music Video of the Year.

== Release history ==
| Region | Date | Format | Label |
|---|---|---|---|
| Various | 30 August 2017 | Digital download; streaming | Client Liaison |
