= Jack River (musician) =

Australian pop musician

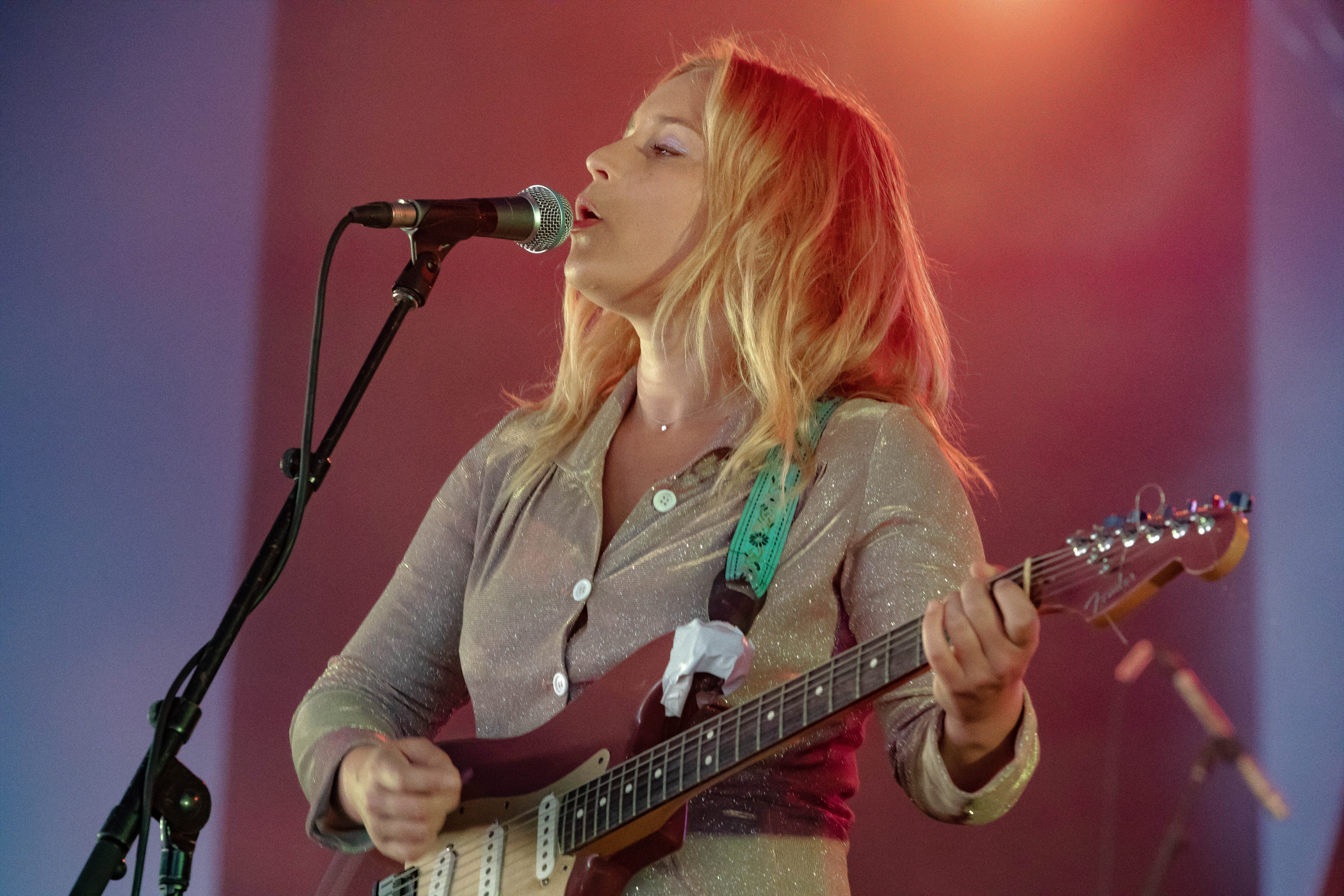
- Falls Festival, Byron Bay, January 2019

Background information
- Born: Holly Isabella Rankin; 19 December 1991 (age 34); Forster, New South Wales, Australia
- Genres: Pop; electronic; alternative rock; indie rock
- Occupations: Musician; producer
- Instruments: Vocals; guitar; piano; violin; trombone
- Years active: 2012–present
- Labels: Waterfront/MGM; I Oh You/Universal
- Website: jackrivermusic.com

Holly Isabella Rankin (born 19 December 1991), known professionally as Jack River, is an Australian singer-songwriter, multi-instrumentalist, and producer. Her debut album, Sugar Mountain (22 June 2018), peaked at No. 11 on the ARIA Albums Chart. At the ARIA Music Awards of 2018 she received nominations for Breakthrough Artist, Best Pop Release and Engineer of the Year (the latter shared with Xavier Dunn and John Castle).

== Early life ==
Holly Isabella Rankin was born on 19 December 1991, to David and Donna Rankin, and raised in Forster, New South Wales. She started writing a diary from the age of five or six, with Rankin stating, "I just had an attraction to writing and also recording things. I've always been fascinated by people and stories and nature."

== Career ==
=== 2013-2016: Career beginnings and EPs ===
Rankin initially performed under her given name, before adopting the performance name, Jack River, upon relocating to Sydney. Her eight-track debut extended play, On Nature Part One, was issued in April 2013 via Waterfront Records and MGM Distribution. James Monger of AllMusic described how her, "laid-back, psych-tinged electropop [had] earned her a loyal local following."

River signed with I Oh You / Universal Music Australia, which issued her single, "Talk Like That", in early 2016. Happy Mag's Emerson Noble felt, "[it] has an incredibly tangible, organic feel that seems to come pretty naturally to [River]. There is an air of self-produced originality that draws you into this track but it's still so damn hooky that you're going to be singing that sweet synth riff for days."

Her seven-track EP, Highway Songs No. 2 (October 2016) peaked at number 19 on the ARIA Hitseekers Albums Chart. It was co-produced by Rankin and Xavier Dunn. Laura Polson of The Newcastle Herald observed, "On top of writing the melody and lyrics, Rankin seeks landscape sounds to add to her music... the opening track 'Highway (Intro)' draws together carnival sounds with a western, cowboy twist."

=== 2017-2022: Sugar Mountain ===
River's single, "Fool's Gold" (June 2017), was accompanied by a music video, which Sosefina Fuamoli of The AU Review felt was, "dreamy as hell" and "lit up through a beautifully-crafted haze of a narrative, following different couples." In June–July 2017 the singer-songwriter launched a series of concerts, Electric Lady, featuring only female acts: Ali Barter, Alex Lahey, and Gretta Ray. River supported Midnight Oil during that year and undertook her own Fool's Gold Tour.

On 22 June 2018, River released her debut album, Sugar Mountain, titled for Neil Young's song of the same name. The album recounts River's painful memories, including her sister's fatal accident. During an interview with Richard Kingsmill on 2018, a program on Triple J radio, River explained that music was her way of dealing with emotions and also as therapy, calling it her "go to for everything". It peaked at number 11 on the Albums Chart and received three nominations at the 2018 ARIA Awards: Breakthrough Artist, Best Pop Release and Engineer of the Year (the latter shared with Dunn and John Castle). In October 2019, she came at no.11 in Happy Mag's list of "The 15 Australian female artists changing the game right now".

On 4 October 2019, River released the single "Later Flight" and announced she had an EP due for release on 14 February 2020.

In September 2021, River released "We Are the Youth" saying "At the same time as there is widespread climate injustice, there is ongoing abuse of power on many fronts in our society: against First Nations people, in the halls of parliament and in workplaces everywhere. People are tired of it. We want change and action and we are ready to work to build our way out of a broken system."

=== 2023: Endless Summer ===
In February 2023, River released "Endless Summer", the title track from her second studio album Endless Summer, released on 16 June 2023. In an album review, Ellie Robinson from NME called it "a psychedelic cruise through streams of pop influenced by surf-rock and shoegaze, carried by lyrics that paint an oddly alluring picture of an apocalyptic hellscape."

=== 2026: "Borderline" ===
In November 2026, River released "Borderline", her first single in three years.

== Personal life ==
Rankin's sister, Shannon Rankin (born 1995), died in 2006 in an accident due to a faulty drain in a spa.

== Political views and activism ==
On 15 February 2019, Rankin was present at Labor New South Wales' live music policy launch in Sydney and delivered a speech in opposition to the Baird Government and their lockout laws. In her speech, Rankin endorsed Labor for the 2019 election. On 3 December 2020, Rankin held a climate panel entitled New Energy, designed to get politicians together to discuss energy and climate policy. The event saw politicians respond to questions from guests, including Triple J presenters Avani Dias and Lewis Hobba, in addition to rugby union player David Pocock, motivational speaker Turia Pitt, and Reuben Styles of electronic music duo Peking Duk. On 27 October 2021, Rankin criticised Scott Morrison and his Government's plan to reach net-zero emissions by 2050, labelling it "gutless" and "paper thin".

== Discography ==
=== Studio albums ===
List of studio albums, with year released and selected chart positions shown
Title	Album details	Peak chart positions
Title	Album details	AUS
Sugar Mountain	Released: 22 June 2018 (Australia); Label: I Oh You (IOU268/IOU269); Formats: CD, LP, digital download, streaming	11
Endless Summer	Released: 16 June 2023; Label: I Oh You (IOU711/IOU712); Formats: CD, digital download, streaming	—

=== Extended plays ===
List of extended plays, with release date and label shown
Title	EP details
On Nature Part One	Released: 5 April 2013; Label: Waterfront Records/MGM Distribution (JACKRIVER01); Format: CD, digital download
Highway Songs No. 2	Released: 7 October 2016; Label: I Oh You (IOU175); Format: CD, digital download, streaming
Stranger Heart	Released: 14 February 2020; Label: I Oh You (IOU402); Format: LP, digital download, streaming

=== Singles ===
==== As lead artist ====
List of singles, with year released, selected chart positions and certifications, and album name shown
Title	Year	Peak chart positions	Certifications	Album
Title	Year	AUS	Certifications	Album
"Talk Like That"	2016	—		Highway Songs No. 2
"Nothing's Gonna Hurt You Baby"	2016	—		Highway Songs No. 2
"Palo Alto"	2016	—	ARIA: Gold	Highway Songs No. 2
"Fool's Gold"	2017	—	ARIA: Platinum	Sugar Mountain
"Fault Line"	2017	—	ARIA: Gold	Sugar Mountain
"Ballroom"	2018	—		Sugar Mountain
"Limo Song"	2018	—		Sugar Mountain
"Confess"	2018	—	ARIA: Gold	Sugar Mountain
"Sugar" (with Peking Duk)	2019	54	ARIA: Platinum; RMNZ: Gold	Non-album single
"Adolescent"	2019	—		Sugar Mountain (Deluxe Edition)
"Later Flight"	2019	—		Stranger Heart
"Closer"	2019	—		Stranger Heart
"Dark Star"	2020	—		Stranger Heart
"We Are the Youth"	2021	—		non album single
"Real Life"	2022	—		Endless Summer
"Nothing Has Changed"	2022	—		Endless Summer
"Endless Summer" (with Genesis Owusu)	2023	—		Endless Summer
"Lie in the Sun"	2023	—		Endless Summer
"Honey"	2023	—		Endless Summer
"Lie to You"	2023	—		Endless Summer
"Borderline"	2026	—		

==== As featured artist ====
List of singles as featured artist, with year released and album shown
Title	Year	Album
"Multiply" (Love Fame Tragedy featuring Jack River)	2020	Five Songs to Briefly Fill the Void and Wherever I Go, I Want To Leave

== Awards ==
=== AIR Awards ===
The Australian Independent Record Awards (commonly known informally as AIR Awards) is an annual awards night to recognise, promote and celebrate the success of Australia's Independent Music sector.

Year	Nominee / work	Award	Result	Ref.
2020	Sugar Mountain	Best Independent Pop Album or EP	Nominated	
2021	Stranger Heart	Best Independent Pop Album or EP	Nominated	
2024	Endless Summer	Best Independent Pop Album or EP	Won	

=== APRA Music Awards ===
The APRA Music Awards are an annual awards ceremony. Jack River has received two nominations.

Year	Nominee / work	Award	Result	Ref.
2019	Herself	Breakthrough Songwriter of the Year	Nominated	
2020	"Sugar" (with Peking Duk)	Most Performed Dance Work of the Year	Nominated	

=== ARIA Music Awards ===
The ARIA Music Awards is an annual awards ceremony that recognises excellence, innovation, and achievement across all genres of Australian music. Jack River has received 4 nominations overall.

Year	Nominee / work	Award	Result
2018	Sugar Mountain	Breakthrough Artist	Nominated
2018	Sugar Mountain	Best Pop Release	Nominated
2018	Holly Rankin, Xavier Dunn & John Castle for Sugar Mountain	Engineer of the Year	Nominated
2019	"Sugar" (with Peking Duk)	Best Dance Release	Nominated

=== Environmental Music Prize ===
The Environmental Music Prize is a quest to find a theme song to inspire action on climate and conservation. It commenced in 2022.

Year	Nominee / work	Award	Result	Ref.
2022	"We Are the Youth"	Environmental Music Prize	Nominated	
2025	"Nature's Cry" (in collaboration with the Australian Conservation Foundation)	Environmental Music Prize	Nominated	

=== J Awards ===
The J Awards are an annual series of Australian music awards that were established by the Australian Broadcasting Corporation's youth-focused radio station Triple J. They commenced in 2005.

Year	Nominee / work	Award	Result	Ref.
2017	"Fool's Gold"	Australian Video of the Year	Nominated	
2021	Jack River	You Done Good Award	Nominated	

=== National Live Music Awards ===
The National Live Music Awards (NLMAs) are a broad recognition of Australia's diverse live industry, celebrating the success of the Australian live scene. The awards commenced in 2016.

Year	Nominee / work	Award	Result	Ref.
2019	Herself	Live Pop Act of the Year	Nominated	
2019	Herself	NSW Live Act of the Year	Won	

=== Rolling Stone Australia Awards ===
The Rolling Stone Australia Awards are awarded annually in January or February by the Australian edition of Rolling Stone magazine for outstanding contributions to popular culture in the previous year.

Year	Nominee / work	Award	Result	Ref.
2022	"We Are the Youth"	Best Single	Nominated	
