= J Awards of 2017 =

Annual Australian music awards

- Date: 23 November 2017
- Venue: Australia
- Website: abc.net.au/triplej

The J Award of 2017 is the thirteenth annual J Awards, established by the Australian Broadcasting Corporation's youth-focused radio station Triple J. The announcement comes at the culmination of Ausmusic Month (November). For the fourth year, four awards were presented; Australian Album of the Year, Double J Artist of the Year, Australian Music Video of the Year and Unearthed Artist of the Year.

The eligible period took place between November 2016 and October 2017. The winners were announced live on air on Triple J on Thursday 23 November 2017.

== Awards ==
=== Australian Album of the Year ===
Artist	Album Title	Result
A.B. Original	Reclaim Australia	Won
Alex Lahey	I Love You Like a Brother	Nominated
Ali Barter	A Suitable Girl	Nominated
Gang of Youths	Go Farther in Lightness	Nominated
Gordi	Reservoir	Nominated
Meg Mac	Low Blows	Nominated
Methyl Ethel	Everything Is Forgotten	Nominated
The Smith Street Band	More Scared of You Than You Are of Me	Nominated
Thundamentals	Everyone We Know	Nominated
Vera Blue	Perennial	Nominated

=== Double J Artist of the Year ===
Artist	Result
Jen Cloher	Won
Dan Sultan	Nominated
Kardajala Kirridarra	Nominated
Lance Ferguson	Nominated
Paul Kelly	Nominated

=== Australian Video of the Year ===
Director	Artist and Song	Result
Tim White	Client Liaison featuring Tina Arena – "A Foreign Affair"	Won
Josh Davis and Heath Kerr	A.B. Original - "Report to the Mist"	Nominated
Matt Sav	Jack River - "Fool's Gold"	Nominated
Danny Cohen	Kirin J. Callinan featuring Alex Cameron, Molly Lewis & Jimmy Barnes - "Big Enough"	Nominated
PAXI	Methyl Ethel - "Ubu"	Nominated

=== Unearthed Artist of the Year ===
Artist	Result
Stella Donnelly	Won
Alex the Astronaut	Nominated
Baker Boy	Nominated
Confidence Man	Nominated
Ruby Fields	Nominated

Perth-based, Stella Donnelly uploaded her debut track "Mechanical Bull" to the Triple J Unearthed site in April 2017. Following this, Donnelly performed with San Cisco, Ali Barter, and Polish Club, as well as performing on the Unearthed stage at Bigsound.
