= Frank Waller =

Frank Waller may refer to:

- Frank Waller (athlete)
- Frank Waller (painter)
