= Divine Intervention =

Divine intervention is an event that occurs when a deity (i.e. God or a god) becomes actively involved in changing some situation in human affairs.

Divine Intervention may also refer to:

== Music ==
- Divine Intervention (Slayer album), a 1994 album by American band, Slayer
- Divine Intervention Tour, a 2015 tour by recording artist Bette Midler
- Divine Intervention (Client Liaison album), a 2021 album by Australian duo Client Liaison
- "Divine Intervention Part 3", a 2002 song by Australian musician Suffa
- "Divine Intervention", a song by Matthew Sweet on the 1991 album Girlfriend
- "Divine Intervention", a song by Pennywise on the 2001 album Land of the Free?
- "Divine Intervention", a song by Backstreet Boys recorded for the 2005 album Never Gone, but it didn't make the cut
- "Divine Intervention", a song by Taking Back Sunday from the 2006 album Louder Now
- "Divine Intervention", a song by Autopilot Off from the 2004 album Make a Sound
- "Divine Intervention", a song for the game Ultrakill

== Other uses ==
- Divine Intervention (2002 film), a film by Elia Suleiman
- Divine Intervention (2007 film), an American romantic comedy-drama film
- Divine/Intervention, a 2015 play about performer Divine

== See also ==
- Act of God, a legal term for natural events that can't be blamed on any person
- Divine providence
- Divine retribution
