= Client Liaison (EP) =

EP by Client Liaison
- Released: 5 September 2014
- Recorded: Melbourne, Australia
- Genre: Electronic pop; Indie pop; synthpop
- Label: Dot Dash Recordings / Inertia
- Producer: Client Liaison

Client Liaison chronology
Client Liaison (2014)	Diplomatic Immunity (2016)

Client Liaison is the self-titled debut extended play (EP) by Australian indie pop duo Client Liaison, released independently on 5 September 2014.

Client Liaison promoted the EP with a national tour throughout August and September.

The first and only single from the EP, "Queen" was released on 12 August 2014.

== Reviews ==
Professional ratings
Review scores
Source	Rating
Tiny Mix Tapes	3.5/5 marks
The Music	3.5/5 stars
The AU Review	6.4 stars on a 10 point scale

Nico Callaghan of Tiny Mix Tapes gave the album 3 1/2 out of 5 saying; "Stylistically speaking, the songs on this debut EP move between new-wave, synth pop, and house. 'End of the Earth,' the opening track and the band’s earliest single dating back three years, is their most overt piece referencing Australian tropes. Following track 'Feed the Rhythm' deals primarily in piano-house, with the echoes of Australiana rendered subtler beneath ravey vocal samples, saxophone solos, and a thumping bass that evokes the period of their fascination with equal magnitude, despite the different focus. It's worth pointing out that, while the majority of this EP is more like the latter, the referential nature of Client Liaison's music is just as brash and in your face."

Stephanie Tell of The Music gave the album 3 1/2 out of 5 saying; "Opening gem "End of the Earth"'s bright, '80s-revived synth-pop is decked out with tribal, junkyard percussion. In contrast, follow-up "Feed the Rhythm" is a '90s-inspired club anthem, funky sax solo included. With dramatic keys, whooshing beats and soulful female BVs, the song is both a drunken crowd-pleaser and feelgood gym jam. The Melbourne duo don’t exactly revitalise the disco-infused, electro-pop genre, but they do filter the best parts of past beats to create sharp'n'shiny retro nostalgia."

Joe Hansen of Beat Magazine gave the EP a positive review, saying: "With previous singles "End of the Earth" and "Feeling" connecting the EP with four brand new tracks, the release is a product of slick professionalism, focus, and an intensely accurate and conscious understanding of the style they have embraced. Vocalist Monte Morgan channels equal parts Prince and Debbie Gibson, with the utmost conviction and dedication to delivering his message. Producer and instrumentalist Harvey Miller provides synth-driven backdrop to the band’s atmosphere of confidence and determination."

Michael Lean from the AU Review said: "Client Liaison are unabashedly retro. Everything about them from the old school mobile phone pasted across their EP cover, their music clips filmed almost purely on self-repaired, discontinued analogue video cameras. Down to the outfits the duo drape themselves in on stage. When their songs are removed from context though they lose impact. They are well constructed and expertly executed but fail to offer anything that hasn’t come before them, which may be the point after all."

== Track listing ==
1. "End of the Earth" – 4:49
2. "Feed the Rhythm" – 4:40
3. "Queen" – 4:49
4. "Groove the Physical" – 3:41
5. "Feeling" – 4:28
6. "Pretty Lovers" – 4:03

== Credits ==
- All tracks written and produced by Harvey Miller AO, Monte Morgan (a.k.a. Client Liaison)
- Illustration – Peter Deering
- Photography – Kate Ballis

== Charts ==
Chart (2014)	Peak position
Australian Albums (ARIA)	76
Australian Independent Albums (AIR)	3

== Release history ==
Region	Date	Format(s)	Label	Catalogue
Australia/New Zealand	5 September 2014	Digital download	Dot Dash Recordings / Inertia	DOT032CD
