= Secret Garden Festival =

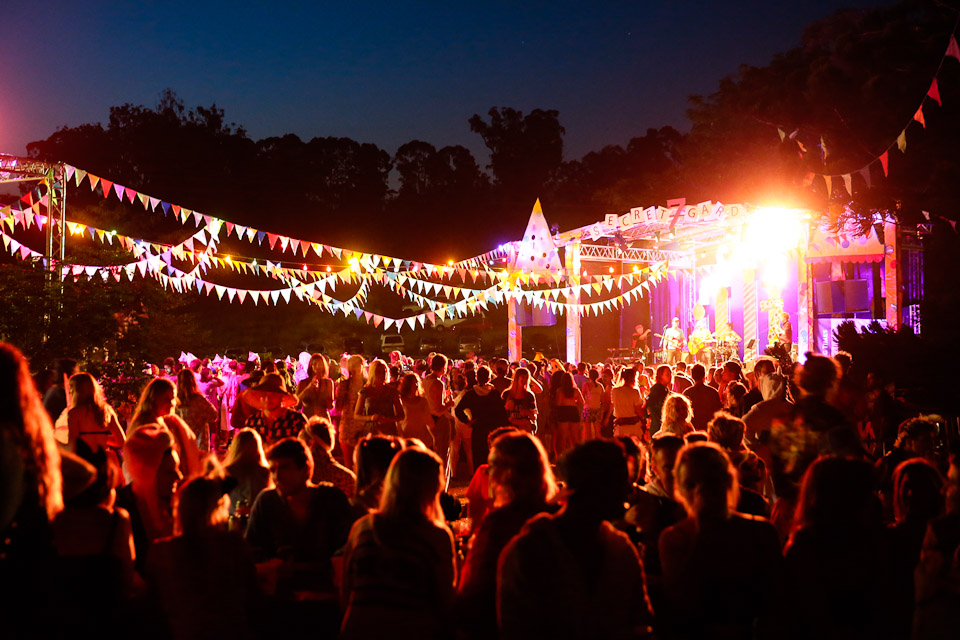

The Secret Garden Festival is a 48-hour forest-themed dress-up festival located in Sydney. The festival provides music as well as small parties, plays, comedy, games and art. With over 5,000 patrons attending each year, the festival has and continues to raise money for charities.

== Location ==
Secret Garden is located one hour south of Sydney. The location is kept secret until a few days prior to the event, when all newcomers are sent an email with the address. It can be accessed via car, or if not there is a bus package available to ticket holders, which leaves from Central station.

== Artist Lineups ==
=== 2016 ===
- Adi Toohey
- Ariane
- Bad//Dreems
- Black Vanilla
- BUOY
- CC:DISCO!
- Cruisin' Deuces
- Dorsal Fins
- Elizabeth Rose (DJ)
- Ella Thompson
- Gang of Youths
- GG MAGREE
- Gordi
- Green Buzzard
- Hayden James
- Hey Geronimo
- Jess Kent
- Jody
- Jonathan Boulet
- L-Fresh the Lion
- Levins
- Love Bombs
- Luen
- Mansionair
- Matt Corby
- Money For Nothing DJs
- Montaigne
- Moonbase Commander
- Motorik Vibe Council
- Palms
- Planète
- Purple Sneakers & Friends
- Raury
- Rock & Roll Karaoke
- Roland Tings
- Sampa the Great
- Saskwatch
- Sex On Toast
- Shag
- Shantan Wantan Ichiban
- Steregamous
- The Completely Boys
- The Lulu Raes
- The Meeting Tree
- Tuka
- World Champion

=== 2015 ===
- Ariane
- Baro
- Client Liaison
- Devotional
- Donny Benét (Solo)
- Fishing
- Frames
- Gang of Youths
- Gooch Palms
- Grace
- Heartbeat DJs
- Heather Woods Broderick
- Holiday Sidewinder
- Hot Dub Time Machine
- I Oh You DJs
- Jack Ladder and The Dreamlanders
- Japanese Wallpaper
- Jeremy Neale
- Joe Liddy & The Skeleton Horse
- JÜAN DU SOL
- Lake Street Dive
- Le Fruit DJs
- Levins
- Little Bastard
- Little May
- Love Bombs
- LUCIANBLOMKAMP
- Luen
- Luluc
- Lunice
- Mike Who
- Milwaukee Banks
- No Zu
- Oh Mercy
- Oisima
- Parquet Courts
- Pepa Knight
- Peter Combe
- Purple Sneakers DJs
- Remi
- Rolls Bayce
- RY4
- San Holo
- Shag
- Shantan Wantan Ichiban
- Sharon Van Etten
- Softwar B2B Slow Blow
- Spookyland
- Stereogamous ft. Shaun J. Wright
- Steve Smyth
- Stolen Violin
- Tees
- The Griswolds
- The Morrisons
- Total Giovanni
- UV Boi
- Velociraptor
- Willow Beats
- Wintercoats
- Yo Grito! DJs
- Yon Yonson

=== 2014 ===
- Alex Cameron
- Ariane
- Blank Realm
- Bloods
- Client Liaison
- Cosmos Midnight
- D. D. Dumbo
- Day Ravies
- Dusty Fingers
- DZ Deathrays
- Elizabeth Rose
- Ernest Ellis
- Goldroom
- Joyride
- Ken Davis
- King Gizzard & the Lizard Wizard
- Lancelot
- Levins
- Little May
- Love Bombs
- Mighty Mouse
- Mike Who
- Nantes
- Olympia
- Palms
- Papa Vs Pretty
- Richard In Your Mind
- Roland Tings
- Ryan Hemsworth
- Shantan Wantan Ichiban
- Shining Bird
- Slowblow & Softwar
- Steve Smyth
- Straight Arrows
- Sures
- The Beatnix
- The Donny Benét Show Band
- The Rubens
- The Trouble with Templeton
- True Vibenation
- Wordlife
- World's End Press

=== 2013 ===
- Alison Wonderland
- Caitlin Park
- Cliques
- Collarbones
- Cub Scouts
- DCUP
- Frames
- Furnance and the Fundamentals
- Joyride
- Lancelot
- Little Bastard
- Little May
- Oliver Tank
- Pelvis
- Rainbow Chan
- Rüfüs
- DJ Crocs
- Softwar & Slowball
- Spit Syndicate
- The Aston Shuffle
- The Delta Riggs
- The Griswolds
- The Preatures
- Vance Joy

=== 2012 ===
- Alison Wonderland
- Castlecomer
- DreamDelay
- Emma Davis
- Evan and the Brave
- Fanny Lumsden
- Georgia Fair
- Horse Meat Disco (UK)
- Jack Carty
- Joyride (DJ Set)
- Kira Puru and the Bruise
- New Navy
- Owl Eyes
- R + R
- SlowBlow
- Softwar
- Sticky Fingers
- The Aston Shuffle DJs
- The Be Sharps
- The Essential Stix
- The Preachers
- Tin Sparrow
- Wordlife (Bang Gang 12 inches)

== Charities ==
All proceeds made at Secret Garden are donated each year to various charities. Over the past seven years Secret Garden has raised more than $200,000 for charities including Oxfam, The Sarah Hilt Foundation and The Girls & Boys Brigade.

== Reception ==
Since its conception in 2009, Secret Garden has grown incredibly. In 2015 Australian radio station Triple J named it "One of Australia's much-loved boutique festivals ... providing two days worth of ace artists at a secret dairy farm". Time Out Sydney also praised the festival, telling punters "This is a good one, though, and worth the mystery. They keep the crowds at a limited capacity, the vibe is loved-up and the site teems with secret pathways and hidden pop-ups housing food, art and entertainment."

Other reviews include:

"A magical, wild and completely creative festival of music and art." - The AU Review

"Pillow forts, giant jellyfish and kissing booths — this independent festival has and always will be built by and for the people." - Concrete Playground

"The most magical of festivals to grace the Australian music scene"- Pedestrian TV
