= Endless Summer (Jack River album) =

Studio album by Jack River
- Released: 16 June 2023
- Genre: Pop
- Length: 33:10
- Label: I Oh You
- Producer: Matt Corby

Jack River chronology
Sugar Mountain (2018)	Endless Summer (2023)

Singles from Endless Summer
- 1. "Real Life" Released: 8 July 2022; 2. "Nothing Has Changed" Released: 18 November 2022; 3. "Endless Summer" Released: 10 February 2023; 4. "Lie in the Sun" Released: 7 April 2023; 5. "Honey" Released: 26 May 2023; 6. "Lie to You" Released: 16 June 2023

Endless Summer is the second studio album by Australian singer-songwriter Jack River, released on 16 June 2023 through I Oh You. It was preceded by the release of the singles "Real Life", "Nothing Has Changed", "Endless Summer" with Genesis Owusu, "Lie in the Sun" and "Honey".

At the AIR Awards of 2024, the album won Best Independent Pop Album or EP.

== Background ==
Holly Rankin stated that the inspiration behind the album is "activism, and sounds of the '60s and '70s when artists were living through political turmoil but making escapist music". The title also refers to "the physical endless summer" of climate change, which Rankin said became "even more tactile" to her when she became pregnant after writing the album, and considering the world she was bringing her daughter into.

== Critical reception ==
Professional ratings
Review scores
Source	Rating
The AU Review	5/5 stars

Sarah Duggan of The AU Review wrote that "this musical gem encapsulates a delightful fusion of psychedelic waves and captivating melodies that will undoubtedly leave you craving more", calling it "undeniably a breathtaking album that envelops you in a sun-drenched journey filled with moments of pure bliss and introspection". Bryget Chrisfield of Beat Magazine remarked that while "so many new releases contain gloomy, Covid-influenced material at present", Endless Summer "instead sends postcards from aspirational Hot Girl Summers" and that it "contains lashings of sugary pop confection (think: Steal My Sunshine by Len) and hooks for days". Josh Leeson of the Newcastle Herald called it an "album of pure escapism".

== Track listing ==
Endless Summer track listing
No.	Title	Length
1.	"Real Life"	3:22
2.	"Lie in the Sun"	2:48
3.	"Endless Summer" (with Genesis Owusu)	3:02
4.	"Lucy Sea Queen"	2:50
5.	"Honey"	2:58
6.	"Lie to You"	3:41
7.	"Nothing Has Changed"	3:08
8.	"Paradise"	3:07
9.	"Holy Men"	3:36
10.	"Stranger's Dream"	4:38
Total length:		33:10
