= National Live Music Awards of 2018 =

Annual Australian music awards ceremony

- Date: 6 December 2018
- Venue: The Triffid, Brisbane, Australia
- Hosted by: Dominic Miller

Highlights
- Most wins: Baker Boy, Stella Donnelly, Tropical Fuck Storm (3)
- Most nominations: Camp Cope, Stella Donnelly (6)

The National Live Music Awards of 2018 are the third National Live Music Awards in Australia. The event took place on 6 December 2018. The event moved its gala event to Brisbane – following events in Sydney and Melbourne in the last two years.

The 2018 event introduced a new award for Best Live Music Photographer in Australia and a Hall of Fame equivalent, titled the Live Legends. Live Country or Folk Act was renamed to Live Country Act. The state based All Ages Achievement expanded to all states and territories, from only NSW and Victoria in 2017. The event was streamed live and for free via Netgigs.

== Live Legends ==
- Magic Dirt

== National awards ==
Nominations and wins below.

Live Act of the Year

Artist	Result
Baker Boy	Won
Camp Cope	Nominated
High Tension	Nominated
WAAX	Nominated
West Thebarton	Nominated

Live Voice of the Year

Artist	Result
Caiti Baker	Nominated
Georgia Maq (Camp Cope)	Nominated
Karina Utomo (High Tension)	Nominated
Kira Puru	Nominated
Stella Donnelly	Won

Best New Act

Artist	Result
A. Swayze & the Ghosts	Nominated
Alex the Astronaut	Nominated
Baker Boy	Nominated
Tropical Fuck Storm	Won
WAAX	Nominated

Live Bassist of the Year

Artist	Result
Annie Siegmann (Mio, Sasha March, Hana & Jessie-Lee and more)	Nominated
Isobel D'Cruz Barnes (HEXDEBT)	Won
Kelly-Dawn Hellmrich (Camp Cope)	Nominated
Nick Brown (Cable Ties)	Nominated
Zoe Hauptmann	Nominated

Live Drummer of the Year

Artist	Result
Dave Mudie (Courtney Barnett)	Nominated
Jen Sholakis (Jen Cloher, East Brunswick All Girls Choir)	Won
Sarah Thompson (Camp Cope)	Nominated
Shauna Boyle (Cable Ties)	Nominated
Tim Commandeur (Pnau, Tkay Maidza)	Nominated

Live Guitarist of the Year

Artist	Result
Aife Larkin (HEXDEBT, Jarrow)	Nominated
Gareth Liddiard (Tropical Fuck Storm)	Won
Jen Cloher	Nominated
Jenny Mckechnie (Cable Ties)	Nominated
Plini Roessler-Holgate	Nominated

Live Instrumentalist of the Year

Artist	Result
Erica Dunn (Tropical Fuck Storm)	Nominated
Hannah Marjorie Crofts (All Our Exes Live in Texas)	Nominated
Kat Mear (Cash Savage and the Last Drinks)	Nominated
Kirsty Tickle (Party Dozen, Exhibitionist)	Nominated
Luke Liang (Guy Sebastian, Alex The Astronaut, Nicole Millar, Jarryd James and more)	Won

Live Blues and Roots Act of the Year

Artist	Result
All Our Exes Live in Texas	Won
Cash Savage and the Last Drinks	Nominated
C.W. Stoneking	Nominated
Dan Sultan	Nominated
John Butler Trio	Nominated

Live Country Act of the Year

Artist	Result
Brad Butcher	Nominated
Fanny Lumsden	Nominated
Freya Josephine Hollick	Nominated
Hana & Jessie Lee's Bad Habits	Nominated
Marlon Williams	Won

Live Electronic Act (or DJ) of the Year

Artist	Result
Alice Ivy	Nominated
Electric Fields	Won
ShockOne	Nominated
The Kite String Tangle	Nominated
The Presets	Nominated

Live Hard Rock Act of the Year

Artist	Result
Amyl and the Sniffers	Nominated
Cable Ties	Nominated
High Tension	Nominated
Luca Brasi	Nominated
Tropical Fuck Storm	Won

Live Hip Hop Act of the Year

Artist	Result
A.B. Original	Nominated
Baker Boy	Won
Genesis Owusu	Nominated
Sampa The Great	Nominated
Tkay Maidza	Nominated

Live Pop Act of the Year

Artist	Result
Ali Barter	Nominated
Amy Shark	Nominated
Confidence Man	Won
Stella Donnelly	Nominated
The Preatures	Nominated

Live R&B or Soul Act of the Year

Artist	Result
Caiti Baker	Nominated
Kira Puru	Nominated
Mojo Juju	Won
The Bamboos	Nominated
The Sugarcanes	Nominated

Best Live Music Festival or Event

Festival or Event	Result
A Festival Called Panama	Nominated
Bigsound	Nominated
Dark Mofo, Tasmania	Won
Falls Festival	Nominated
Yours and Owls	Nominated

Best Live Photographer of the Year

Festival or Event	Result
Jess Gleeson	Won
Kane Hibberd	Nominated
Lauren Connelly	Nominated
Michelle Grace Hunder	Nominated
Naomi Beveridge	Nominated

International Live Achievement (Band)

Band	Result
Camp Cope	Nominated
Gang of Youths	Won
Methyl Ethel	Nominated
Peking Duk	Nominated
West Thebarton	Nominated

International Live Achievement (Solo)

Group	Result
Alex Lahey	Nominated
Amy Shark	Nominated
Courtney Barnett	Won
Stella Donnelly	Nominated
Tash Sultana	Nominated

Industry Achievement

Name	Result	Notes
Camp Cope	Nominated	For speaking out against venues and festivals who program problematic acts and don't aim for a gender balance.
Girls Rock! Australia	Won	A national network of girls rock camps. Each program is independently run by a team of musicians and educators passionate about empowering girls, trans and gender-diverse young people through music education and mentorship.
Helen Marcou	Nominated	Helen's continued involvement and leadership in supporting live music via the SLAM and Safer Venues activities has been so successful that her ideas have been highly influential across the entire country, not just in Victoria.
Milk! Records	Nominated	Not since Michael Gudinski established Mushroom Records in 1970's has there been such awareness raised and conversations started re Independent vs major release/distribution, and this is all thanks to the amazing Jen Cloher, Courtney Barnett and their team at Milk!
Sharni Honor	Nominated	One of the industry's brightest lights is Sharni Honor in Adelaide, who is responsible for creating The Porch Sessions, The Porch Sessions Tour and Porchland Festival – providing a wealth of opportunities for emerging musicians.

== People's Choice awards ==
Best Live Act of the Year

Artist	Result
A Swayze and the Ghosts	Nominated
Ball Park Music	Nominated
Dean Lewis	Nominated
Ecca Vandal	Nominated
Electrik Lemonade	Nominated
Hockey Dad	Nominated
Mojo Juju	Nominated
Rackett	Nominated
Sampa the Great	Nominated
The Cat Empire	Won

Best Live Voice of the Year

Artist	Result
Alex the Astronaut	Nominated
Amy Shark	Nominated
Angie McMahon	Nominated
Carla Geneve	Nominated
Harry James Angus (of The Cat Empire)	Won
Kira Puru	Nominated
Marie Devita (of Waax)	Nominated
Stella Donnelly	Nominated
Thando	Nominated
Timothy James Bowen	Nominated

== State and Territory awards ==
- Note: Wins only.

ACT Awards - Presented by BMA Magazine
Award	Winner
Live Act of the Year	Moaning Lisa
Live Voice of the Year	Ella Hunt (Lowlands)
Live Venue of the Year	The Phoenix Bar
Live Event of the Year	Spilt Milk
All Ages Achievement	Girls Rock! Canberra

Northern Territory Awards - Presented by Foldback Magazine
Award	Winner
Live Act of the Year	Baker Boy
Live Voice of the Year	Caiti Baker
Live Venue of the Year	Darwin Railway Club
Live Event of the Year	Darwin Festival
All Ages Achievement	MusicNT – Sista Sounds

NSW Awards - Presented by 2SER
Award	Winner
Live Act of the Year	Gang of Youths
Live Voice of the Year	Julia Jacklin
Live Venue of the Year	Enmore Theatre, Sydney
Live Event of the Year	Splendour in the Grass
All Ages Achievement	Under 18s Festival

Queensland Awards - Presented by 4ZZZ
Award	Winner
Live Act of the Year	WAAX
Live Voice of the Year	Amy Shark
Live Venue of the Year	The Triffid
Live Event of the Year	BIGSOUND
All Ages Achievement	Woodfordia

South Australian Awards - Presented by Radio Adelaide
Award	Winner
Live Act of the Year	West Thebarton
Live Voice of the Year	Tkay Maidza
Live Venue of the Year	Crown & Anchor
Live Event of the Year	A Day of Clarity
All Ages Achievement	Music SA

Tasmanian Awards - Presented by Edge Radio
Award	Winner
Live Act of the Year	A Swayze and the Ghosts
Live Voice of the Year	Tyler Richardson (Luca Brasi)
Live Venue of the Year	Odeon Theatre, Hobart
Live Event of the Year	A Festival Called Panama
All Ages Achievement	Tasmanian Rock Challenge (Brad Harbeck)

Victorian Awards - Presented by SYN Media
Award	Winner
Live Act of the Year	Alex Lahey
Live Voice of the Year	Angie McMahon
Live Venue of the Year	The Tote Hotel
Live Event of the Year	Meredith Music Festival
All Ages Achievement	Kate Duncan, The Push

West Australian Awards - Presented by RTR FM
Award	Winner
Live Act of the Year	Stella Donnelly
Live Voice of the Year	Stella Donnelly
Live Venue of the Year	Mojo's
Live Event of the Year	Nannup Music Festival
All Ages Achievement	Hyperfest
