= Nannup Music Festival =

Music festival in Western Australia

Coordinates: 33°58′43″S 115°45′53″E

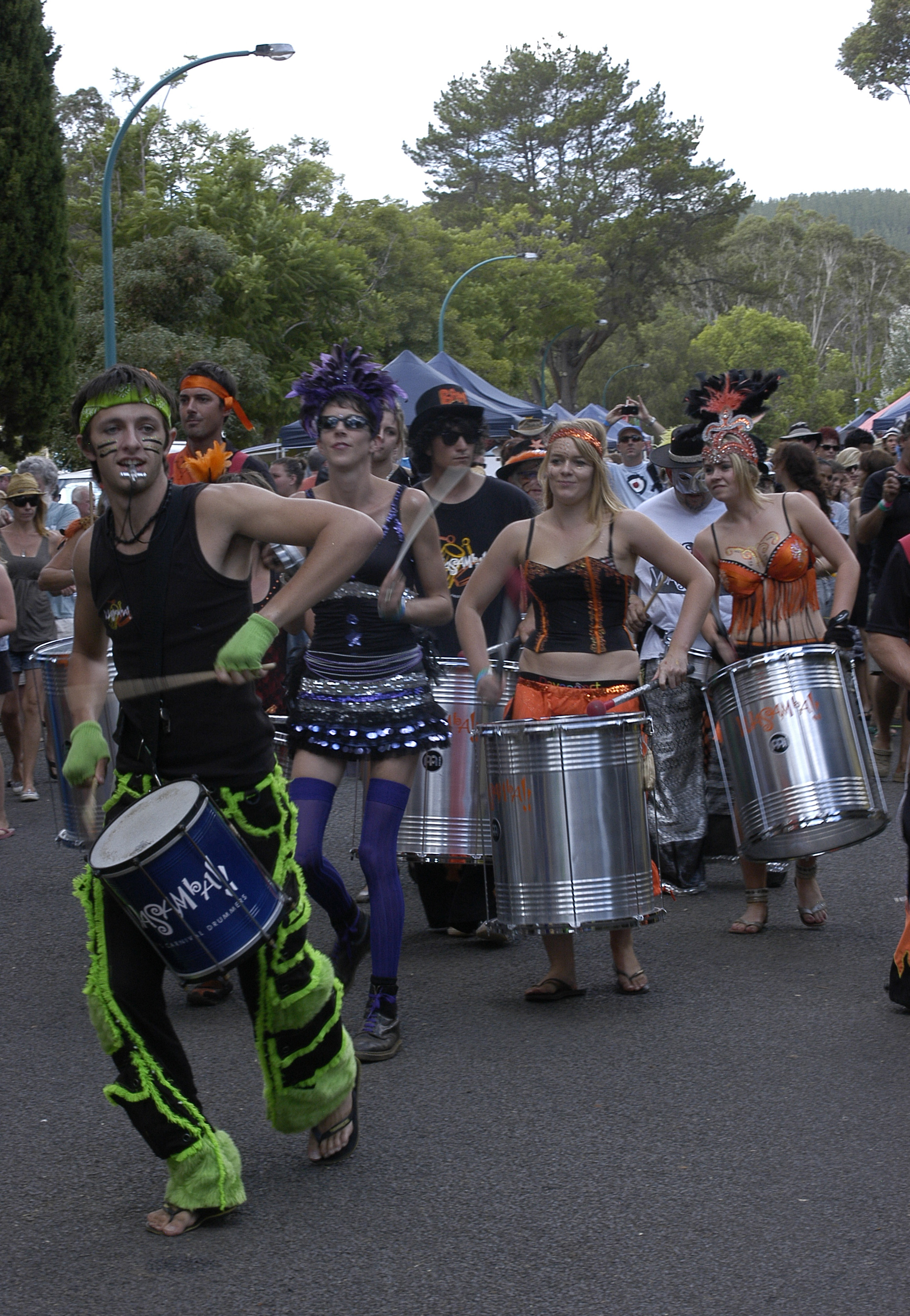
Part of a weekend festival and workshop at Nannup

The Nannup Music Festival (formerly the Southwest Folk Festival) is an Australian live performance music festival held in the small timber town of Nannup. Nannup is located in the centre of Western Australia's South West, on the banks of the Blackwood River and the Festival is held annually over the Labour Day long weekend in March. The thirtieth anniversary event was in 2020. The Festival is a community event operated by a Committee and a team of volunteers from the not-for-profit Nannup Music Club.

== Awards and nominations ==
=== National Live Music Awards ===
The National Live Music Awards (NLMAs) commenced in 2016 to recognise contributions to the live music industry in Australia.

Year	Nominee / work	Award	Result
National Live Music Awards of 2018	Nannup Music Festival	West Australian Live Event of the Year	Won
National Live Music Awards of 2023	Nannup Music Festival	West Australian Live Event of the Year	Won
