= World of Our Love =

Single by Client Liaison

from the album Diplomatic Immunity
- Released: 19 April 2016
- Recorded: 2016
- Length: 4:30
- Label: Dot Dash
- Songwriters: Harvey Miller; Monte Morgan
- Producers: Client Liaison; Flight Facilities

Client Liaison singles chronology
"Queen" (2014)	"World of Our Love" (2016)	"Wild Life" (2016)

Music video
- "World of Our Love" on YouTube

"World of Our Love" is a song written by Australian group Client Liaison and co-produced with Flight Facilities. It was released on 19 April 2016 as the lead single from their debut studio album, Diplomatic Immunity (2016). The single was certified gold in Australia in 2018.

== Reception ==
"World of Our Love" peaked at No. 11 on the ARIA Hitseekers Singles chart; it was certified gold, for shipment of 35000 copies, by Australian Recording Industry Association (ARIA) in January 2018.

Sosefina Fuamoli from The Music AU observed, "With some well timed saxophone blending in with the shimmery and uber-danceable beat, 'World of Our Love' is inviting, fun and excellently executed."

== Music video ==
The song's music video was directed by Mike Greaney and Aaron McDonald with art direction from Jarrod Prince. It was released on 11 May 2016. The animated music video was made in collaboration with Oh Yeah Wow and is a tribute to the opulence of Australian life and culture. Greaney and McDonald described how, "It's an absurdist pastiche of cultist and Australiana iconography, retro-future architecture, and exotic wild animals. We packaged these ideas up in a visual style that was heavily inspired by late 80s Masters of the Universe cartoons and then basically just had a blast coming up with the most outrageous ideas we could think of within that frame work."

== Charts ==
Chart (2017)	Peak position
Australia (ARIA)	196
Australian Independent Chart (AIR)	7

== Certifications ==
Region	Certification	Certified units/sales
Australia (ARIA)	Gold	35,000^{‡}
^{‡} Sales+streaming figures based on certification alone.

== Release history ==
Region	Date	Format	Label
Various	19 April 2016	Digital download	Dot Dash Recording
