= We Are the Youth (song) =

Single by Jack River
- Released: 10 September 2021
- Length: 3:33
- Label: I OH YOU
- Songwriters: Holly Rankin; Edwin White; Joel Quartermain; Xavier Dunn
- Producers: Holly Rankin; Matt Corby

Jack River singles chronology
"Multiply" (2020)	"We Are the Youth" (2021)

Music video
- "We Are the Youth" on YouTube

"We Are the Youth" is a song by Australian singer songwriter, Jack River. It was released in September 2021.

In November 2021, Rankin performed the song on The Sound.

In December 2021, River partnered with Sydney's The Artist Studio to launch We Are the Youth Day where the song was reinterpreted by 14 up-and-coming artists.

At the 2022 Rolling Stone Australia Awards, the song was nominated for Best Single.

The song was also nominated for the inaugural Environmental Music Prize in 2022.

== Background ==
Holly Rankin (Jack River) said she was inspired to write the track after performing at the 2019 School Strike for Climate rally calling gate song "a protest anthem that forefronts a new generation of advocates and activists fighting for change". Rankin said "I played to 80,000 young people, and I realised that I didn’t have an anthem for them, and myself – to express how we felt about the times." Rankin told Broadsheet, "I had the concept for a really long time, over six or seven years, but being at that march made me realise I didn't have the song to give to these students and to my generation about how I'm feeling and how they're feeling."

Rankin was empowered by this moment and inspired by multiple global social movements and Rankin's own experiences as well as forebears of the 'political pop' style of music such as Bob Dylan, Joni Mitchell and Neil Young.

Rankin said she began writing the song about "climate action", but released "...it needed to be about everything that everyone is feeling, which is, I think, a really persistent frustration with our leader and global leaders on climate action, on First Nations' rights and respects, on women's rights and respects. It feels like we’re at a cultural turning point. A lot of us feel like it can be tipped, but we're exhausted and the change needs to be urgent – especially with impending climate doom."

== Music video ==
The music video was directed by Rankin and Nyikina Warrwa and Wangkumara-Barkindji filmmaker Marlikka Perdrisat. It begins with a card dedicating the track to "the billions of young people driving urgent political and social change. We are living in the anthropocene. The actions of this generation will define the destiny of humanity and the planet for the rest of time." It is assembled from archival footage and focuses on global change-makers such as Jean Hinchcliffe, Grace Tame and Brittany Higgins, in addition to global advocates like Amanda Gorman, Hindou Oumarou Ibrahim and Autumn Peltier.

== Reception ==
Tyler Jenke from Rolling Stone Australia called it "likely one of the most important songs of her career, unveiling the uplifting and powerful protest anthem."

Sose Fuamoli from Australian Broadcasting Corporation said "The new Jack River single comes at us hard, but in the unique way only her music can. On the surface, it lands like a hazy folk-pop dream, yet stripping away those layers, we find some propulsive and honest songwriting from Jack River that can really strike a chord." adding "'We Are The Youth' is glimmering and pumped up with guitars and percussion that properly capture the essence behind the song's message."

Emma Joyce from Broadsheet said "'We Are the Youth' can be described as 'political pop'. It's a shimmering mix of warped guitars and stomping drums."
