= Divine Intervention (Client Liaison album) =

Studio album by Client Liaison
- Released: 1 October 2021
- Length: 52:46
- Label: Warner Music Australia
- Producer: Client Liaison; Francois Tetaz; Dann Hume; Nick Littlemore; Xavier Dunn; Lewis Stephenson; Benson; Edwin White; Joel Quartermain; Matthias Dierkes

Client Liaison chronology
| Diplomatic Immunity (2016) | Divine Intervention (2021) |

Singles from Divine Intervention
- 1. "The Real Thing" Released: 31 July 2019; 2. "The Beat Supreme" Released: 4 October 2019; 3. "Champagne Affection" Released: 29 November 2019; 4. "Intervention" Released: 30 October 2020; 5. "House of Holy" Released: 10 June 2021; 6. "Elevator Up" Released: 20 August 2021; 7. "Strictly Business" Released: 1 October 2021

Divine Intervention is the second studio album by Australian indie pop duo Client Liaison, released on 1 October 2021. Divine Intervention became the band's first ARIA top ten albums, debuting at number 7.

== Background ==
Following the release of their 2016 debut album Diplomatic Immunity, Client Liaison released the stand-alone single "Survival in the City" on 4 May 2018, confirming with Triple J "there's heaps more music to come."

In August 2019, Client Liaison released "The Real Thing", and confirmed they are working on a second studio album alongside Dann Hume and Nick Littlemore. Two additional singles were released in 2019.

On 30 October 2020, Client Liaison released "Intervention", which Purple Sneakers said "is the perfect form of escapism taking you from the bedroom to a propulsive dance-floor in a pandemic free world."

The album and forthcoming tour dates were announced on 10 June 2021, alongside the released of the fifth single "House of Holy". In a press statement, the band said "'House of Holy' sets the tone for what this album is all about. It looks to the future with restless wonder, dedicating mind, body and spirit to having a seriously good time."

== Reception ==
Professional ratings
Review scores
| Source | Rating |
|---|---|
| Rolling Stone Australia | 4/5 stars |
| auspOp | 4/5 |

Tyler Jenke from Rolling Stone Australia said "Divine Intervention is a jam-packed affair which illustrates every facet of the Client Liaison experience. From slick instrumentation, to the carefree, iconic-pop stylings reminiscent of '90s-era Michael Jackson, there's barely a second that goes by in which you're unable to feel the same energy, excitement, and pure, unadulterated enjoyment that both Morgan and Miller are producing the record with." David from auspOp said This album affirm "Australian artists have real vision to create music that's not just meaningful to us domestically, but to the rest of the globe too. As a body of work, Divine Intervention makes it incredibly hard not to fall in love with Client Liaison's unique brand of music."

== Track listing ==
Divine Intervention track listing
| No. | Title | Writer(s) | Producer(s) | Length |
|---|---|---|---|---|
| 1. | "Divine Intervention" | Monte Morgan; Harvey Miller | Client Liaison | 0:45 |
| 2. | "Club Called Heaven" | Morgan; Miller; Edwin White; Joel Quartermain; Xavier Patrick Dunn | Client Liaison; Francois Tetaz; Xavier Dunn | 2:49 |
| 3. | "Strictly Business" | Morgan; Miller; Dann Hume | Client Liaison; D. Hume | 4:05 |
| 4. | "Cold to Touch" (featuring Glades) | Morgan; Miller; D. Hume | Client Liaison; D. Hume | 4:30 |
| 5. | "Champagne Affection" | Morgan; Miller; D. Hume | Client Liaison; D. Hume | 3:48 |
| 6. | "The Real Thing" | Morgan; Miller; D. Hume | Client Liaison; D. Hume | 4:28 |
| 7. | "Unloaded" | Morgan; Miller; Peter Hume; White; Quartermain | Client Liaison; Tetaz; Lewis Stephenson; Benson | 4:26 |
| 8. | "Eulogy for the Living" | Morgan; Miller; Mike Waters; White; Quartermain | Client Liaison; Tetaz; White; Quartermain; D. Hume | 3:33 |
| 9. | "Prisoners of the High Life" | Morgan; Miller | Client Liaison; Tetaz | 4:16 |
| 10. | "Intervention" | Morgan; Miller; Cyrus Villanueva; Ned Houston; Tim Metcalfe | Client Liaison; Tetaz | 3:43 |
| 11. | "Elevator Up" | Morgan; Miller; Nicholas Littlemore | Client Liaison; Tetaz; Littlemore | 3:14 |
| 12. | "House of Holy" | Morgan; Miller; Littlemore | Client Liaison; Tetaz; Littlemore | 4:31 |
| 13. | "The Beat Supreme" | Morgan; Miller; D. Hume | Client Liaison; D. Hume | 4:23 |
| 14. | "Witness" | Morgan; Miller; Mattias Dierkes; Jonathan Dreyfus | Client Liaison; Tetaz; Dierkes | 4:15 |
| Total length: | | | | 52:46 |

== Charts ==
Chart performance for Divine Intervention
| Chart (2021) | Peak position |
|---|---|
| Australian Albums (ARIA) | 7 |

== Release history ==
Release history and formats for Divine Intervention
| Region | Date | Format(s) | Label | Catalogue |
|---|---|---|---|---|
| Australia | 1 October 2021 | Digital download, CD, LP, streaming | Warner Music Australia | 5419710957 / 5419710950 |
