= Alex the Astronaut =

Australian folk-pop singer and songwriter

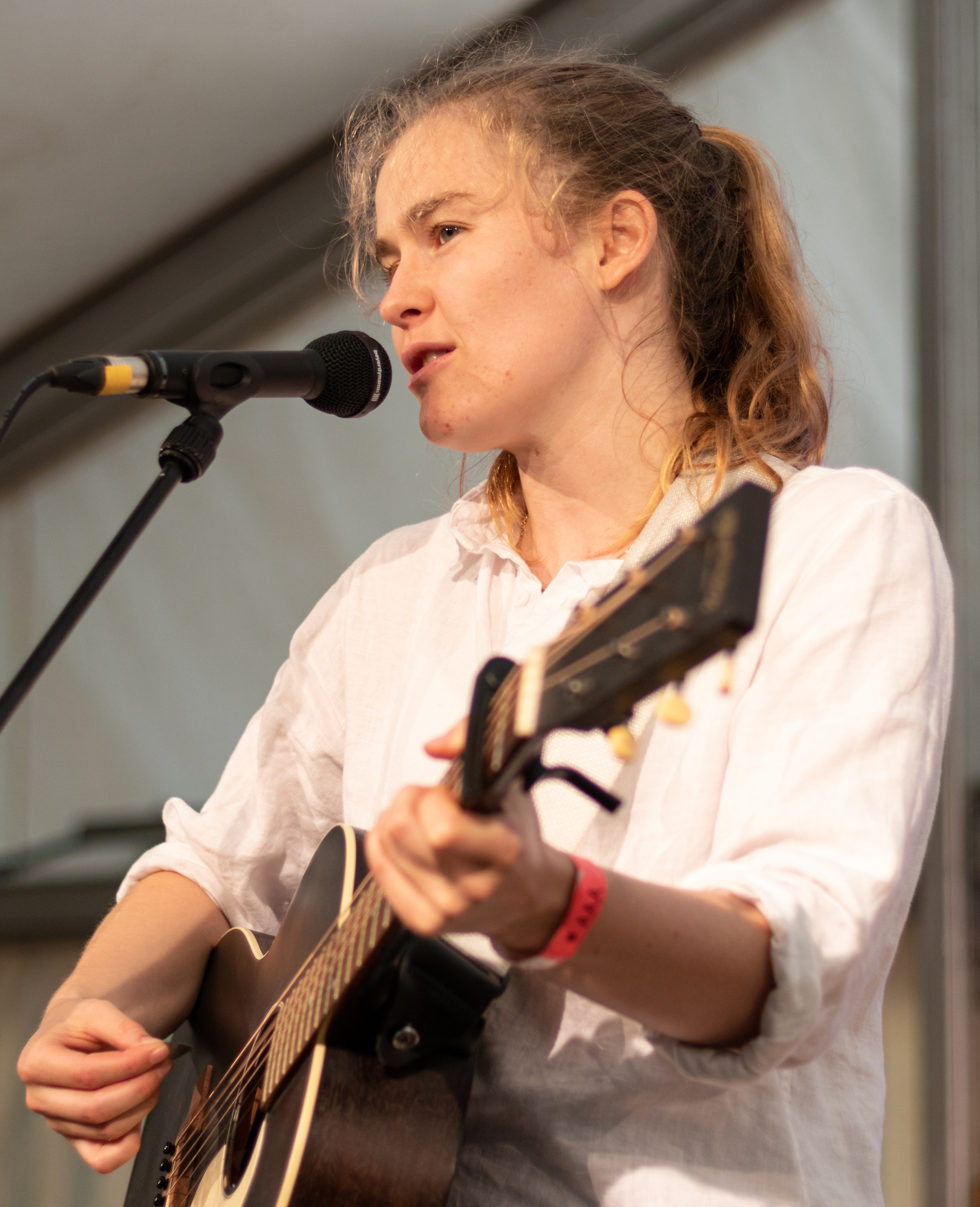
- Alex the Astronaut performing live in August 2019

Background information
- Born: Alexandra Frances Lynn; 3 March 1995 (age 31); Sydney, New South Wales, Australia
- Genres: Folk pop; folktronica
- Occupations: Singer; songwriter
- Instruments: Vocals; guitar; piano; keyboards; drums; percussion
- Years active: 2016–present
- Label: Minkowski Records
- Website: alextheastronaut.com

Alexandra Frances Lynn (born 3 March 1995), known professionally as Alex the Astronaut, is an Australian folk-pop singer-songwriter.

Her (Note: Lynn uses both she/her and they/them pronouns and switches between them; this article uses she/her for consistency.) debut album The Theory of Absolutely Nothing was released on 21 August 2020, and peaked at number 22 on the ARIA Album's Chart. Her second studio album How to Grow a Sunflower Underwater was released on 22 July 2022.

Lynn has her own record label, Minkowski Records, which was named after the Minkowski diagram.

== Early life ==
Lynn graduated from Pymble Ladies' College in Sydney before studying maths and physics at Long Island University, New York, including a thesis on sonoluminescence, where she played soccer for the LIU Post Pioneers as a forward.

== Career ==
=== 2017–2018: To Whom It May Concern and See You Soon ===
Lynn released her debut EP To Whom It May Concern as Alex the Astronaut in 2017. The EP features the single "Already Home", which was described by HuffPost Australia as "a melancholy number about a bus ride and ruminations on the mundanities of life".

Lynn's second EP See You Soon featured the single "Not Worth Hiding", and was nominated for a J Award for Unearthed Artist of the Year in 2017.

"Not Worth Hiding" ranked at number 23 on Triple J Hottest 100 and it described as an unofficial anthem for the "Yes" campaign in the Australian Marriage Law Postal Survey.

Lynn performed at The Great Escape Festival in Brighton, UK, and at the Primavera Sound Festival in Barcelona. Alex the Astronaut commenced their first national Australian headline tour in November 2018.

=== 2019–2020: The Theory of Absolutely Nothing ===
Lynn released the single "I Like To Dance" on 8 August 2019. which Brooklyn Vegan described as "tuneful folk-pop to tell a haunting story".

In January 2020, Alex the Astronaut released the single "I Think You're Great" and "Split the Sky" in April. The track references the film franchise, Harry Potter, in the opening line where Lynn sings "I've been colder, watching Harry Potter looking older". Alex The Astronaut tweeted the inspiration upon release, and James and Oliver Phelps, who played the Weasley twins, both retweeted the post.

In May 2020, Lynn announced her album The Theory of Absolutely Nothing, scheduled for release on 21 August 2020, and released a subsequent single titled "Lost".

The Theory of Absolutely Nothing was released on 21 August 2020, with Lynn releasing the single "Caught in the Middle" on the same day. The accompanying music video for the single features an appearance from Lindy Morrison of the Go-Betweens, and shows the two playing tennis and drumming competitively. The Line of Best Fit described her debut album as "a record packed full of vibrant, witty, insightful and heart-rending storytelling, all hooked around rich and tender folk-pop melodies". NME Australia praised the album as a "dynamic, ambitious debut" and gave it a five-star review.

=== 2021–present: How to Grow a Sunflower Underwater ===
On 19 November 2021, Lynn released "Growing Up" which according to triple j, is her "favourite, most honest song" she has written. Its sequel "Airport" was released in January 2022. On 3 March 2022, Lynn released "Octopus" and announced the release of her second studio album, How to Grow a Sunflower Underwater.

== Personal life ==
Lynn identifies herself as gay. She has been quoted as saying she is "not at a definitive spot" in her gender identity journey. Lynn uses she/they pronouns. Lynn was diagnosed with autism in May 2021.

== Musical style and influences ==
Lynn's music has been described as folk pop and folktronica, and has drawn comparisons to Australian musician Paul Kelly.

== Discography ==
=== Studio albums ===
List of studio albums, with release date, label, and selected chart positions shown
Title	Details	Peak chart positions
Title	Details	AUS
The Theory of Absolutely Nothing	Released: 21 August 2020; Label: ADA, Nettwerk; Formats: CD, LP, digital download, streaming	22
How to Grow a Sunflower Underwater	Released: 22 July 2022; Label: Warner Music Australia; Formats: CD, LP, digital download, streaming	47

=== Live albums ===
List of live albums released with label and release date shown
Title	Details
The Space Tour Live (At Your Place)	Released: 26 April 2019; Label: Minkowski; Formats: Digital download, streaming

=== Extended plays ===
List of EPs, with label and release date shown
Title	Details	Peak chart positions
Title	Details	AUS
To Whom It May Concern	Released: 31 March 2017; Label: Minkowski Records; Formats: LP, (Note: To Whom It May Concern and See You Soon received a physical release as Notes from an Astronaut.) digital download, streaming	—
See You Soon	Released: 6 October 2017; Label: Minkowski; Formats: LP, digital download, streaming	—
Rage & All Its Friends	Released: 22 November 2024; Label: Minkowski; Formats: digital download, streaming	19
The Weird One	Released: 25 September 2026; Label: Minkowski; Formats: digital download, streaming	TBA

=== Singles ===
==== As lead artist ====
List of singles, with year released and album details shown
Title	Year	Album
"Already Home"	2016	To Whom It May Concern
"Rockstar City"	2017	To Whom It May Concern
"Not Worth Hiding"	2017	See You Soon
"Waste of Time"	2018	Non-album single
"Happy Song" (original or Shed mix)	2018	The Theory of Absolutely Nothing
"I Like to Dance"	2019	The Theory of Absolutely Nothing
"I Think You're Great"	2020	The Theory of Absolutely Nothing
"Split the Sky"	2020	The Theory of Absolutely Nothing
"Lost"	2020	The Theory of Absolutely Nothing
"Banksia"	2020	The Theory of Absolutely Nothing
"Christmas in July"	2020	The Theory of Absolutely Nothing
"Caught in the Middle"	2020	The Theory of Absolutely Nothing
"Growing Up"	2021	How to Grow a Sunflower Underwater
"Airport"	2022	How to Grow a Sunflower Underwater
"Octopus"	2022	How to Grow a Sunflower Underwater
"Haircut"	2022	How to Grow a Sunflower Underwater
"Ride My Bike"	2022	How to Grow a Sunflower Underwater
"South London"	2022	How to Grow a Sunflower Underwater
"Cold Pizza"	2024	Rage & All Its Friends
"If You Have to Go"	2024	Rage & All Its Friends
"Road Rage"	2024	Rage & All Its Friends
"Business Man"	2026	The Weird One
"In Nashville"	2026	The Weird One
"I Just Wanna Dance"	2026	The Weird One
"Music Shop"	2026	The Weird One

==== As featured artist ====
List of singles, with year released and album shown
Title	Year	Album
"Dickheads" (Tuka featuring Alex the Astronaut)	2020	Non-album single

== Awards and nominations ==
=== AIR Awards ===
The Australian Independent Record Awards (known colloquially as the AIR Awards) is an annual awards night to recognise, promote and celebrate the success of Australia's independent music sector.

Year	Nominee / work	Award	Result	Ref.
2018	See You Soon	Best Independent Album	Nominated	

=== ARIA Music Awards ===
The ARIA Music Awards is an annual awards ceremony that recognises excellence, innovation, and achievement across all genres of the music of Australia. Alex the Astronaut has received one nomination.

Year	Nominee / work	Award	Result	Ref.
2020	The Theory of Absolutely Nothing	Breakthrough Artist – Release	Nominated	
2022	How to Grow a Sunflower Underwater	Best Adult Contemporary Album	Nominated	
2022	Giulia Giannini McGauran for Alex the Astronaut How to Grow a Sunflower Underwater	Best Cover Art	Nominated	

=== J Awards ===
The J Awards are an annual series of Australian music awards that were established by the Australian Broadcasting Corporation's youth-focused radio station Triple J. They commenced in 2005.

Year	Nominee / work	Award	Result	Ref.
2017	Herself	Unearthed Artist of the Year	Won	

=== National Live Music Awards ===
The National Live Music Awards (NLMAs) are a broad recognition of Australia's diverse live industry, celebrating the success of the Australian live scene. The awards commenced in 2016.

Year	Nominee / work	Award	Result	Ref.
2018	Herself	Best New Act	Nominated	
2018	Herself	People's Choice – Best Live Voice of the Year	Nominated	
