= Frank Waller (painter) =

American architect and painter

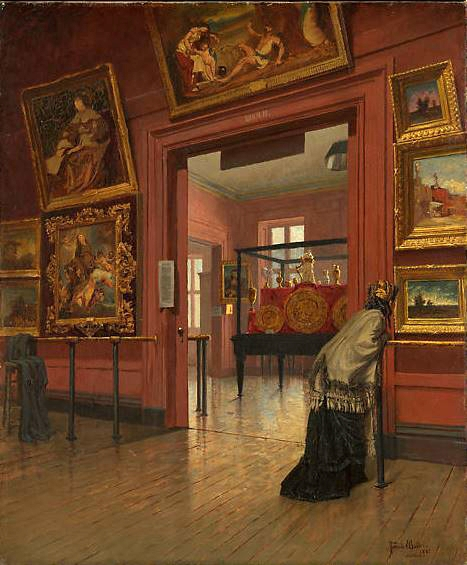
Interior of the Metropolitan Museum of Art

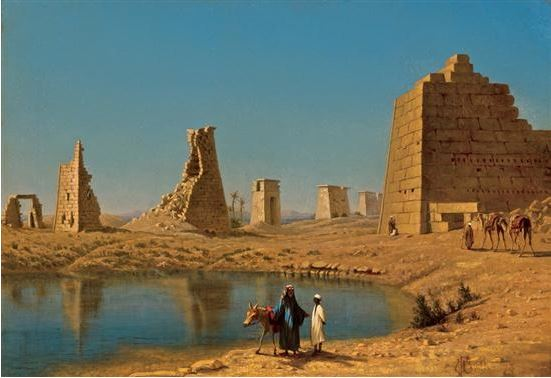
Egyptian Ruins

Frank Waller (12 June 1842, New York City - 9 March 1923, Morristown, NJ) was an American architect, Orientalist and landscape painter.

== Biography ==
His father was a drygoods merchant who died while Frank was still a boy.

From 1857 to 1861, he attended the New York Free Academy (now the City College of New York) where he studied commercial art. During the 1860s, he was employed in that capacity and painted in his spare time. In 1870, he began exhibiting at the National Academy of Design. That same year, he undertook a study trip to Europe and spent some time in Rome, studying with John Gadsby Chapman, who was then quite poor and dependent on support from his fellow expatriates.

He returned to New York in 1871, but left again, the very next year, to visit Egypt with the history painter, Edwin White. He developed a lifelong interest in the area; later becoming a member of the Egypt Exploration Society.

Always seeking to improve himself, he continued his studies, with Lemuel Wilmarth, and participated in the founding of the Art Students League of New York, visiting several art schools in Europe to report on their methods, and serving in various administrative capacities through the 1880s. He also exhibited frequently, at the Brooklyn Art Association and the Pennsylvania Academy of Fine Arts, among others.

After 1885, he worked as an architect and joined the Architectural League of New York. Most of his designs were for country homes, but he also helped design the First National Bank of Cooperstown, New York. He also travelled, producing small oil sketches of the places he visited.

In 1895, he went to live in Morristown, New Jersey. After 1902, he gave up architecture and turned to landscape painting, which he would pursue until his death in 1923.
