= Ali Barter =

Australian singer-songwriter

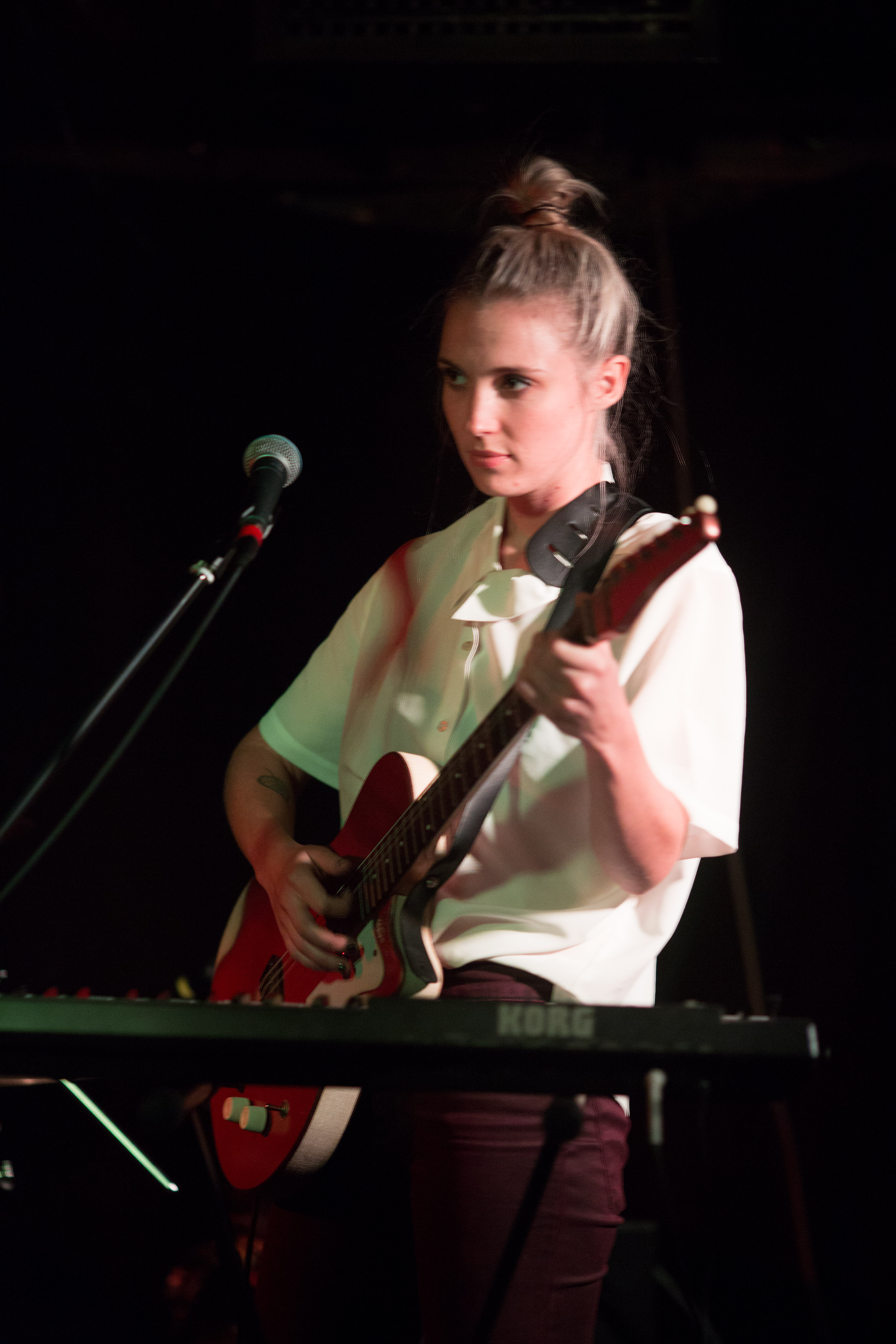
- Barter, April 2013

Background information
- Born: Alison Barter; Melbourne, Victoria, Australia
- Genre: Pop rock
- Occupations: Tour guide; Musician
- Instruments: Vocals; guitar; bass
- Years active: 2012–2022 (musician); 2022–present (tour guide)
- Labels: Ronnie/MGM; Independent/Inertia
- Website: alibartermusic.com

Alison Barter is an Australian tour guide and former singer-songwriter. Trained in classical music, Barter began writing and independently releasing pop rock in her mid-twenties. She released an EP, Trip, in 2012 and was the winner of the 2013 Triple J Unearthed competition. An opinion column Barter wrote in 2016 for Junkee, on the need for representation of women in music history, attracted local and international attention. Barter released one live and two studio albums before ultimately leaving the music industry in 2022. She married musician and collaborator Oscar Dawson in 2016.

== Early years ==
Ali Barter was born in Melbourne. She was raised by an Irish Catholic father (who had a son from a previous marriage) and a Buddhist mother. She spent her early years in Lae, Papua New Guinea, where her father worked. The family moved to Cairns before returning to Melbourne where she attended a Methodist secondary school. Barter was trained as a classical vocalist and spent eight years singing in the Australian Girls Choir. She left music, at about 14 to 16, and became a self-proclaimed 'rat bag': "I was just naughty. Drinking/partying too much and too often, behaving badly ... just bummed around being a pest. Not contributing!" Her father unexpectedly died when she was 24.

== Career ==
Barter said she had a "taste of mortality" resulting from her father's early death. She returned to music soon after, feeling that if she "didn't do something then then I'd waste my life", and began writing and releasing music independently.

Barter issued her debut extended play (EP), Trip, in August 2012. It was recorded and produced in Melbourne by local beat-maker Matik. It provided the single "Run You Down", which was co-written by Barter and Stephen Mowat. She was a 2013 Triple J Unearthed winner, earning a spot on the line-up at St Jerome's Laneway Festival in that year. She followed with support slots for Vance Joy, Cloud Control and the Rubens. Late in 2013 her second EP, Community, was released, which was produced by Oscar Dawson (of Holy Holy). She toured with the War on Drugs.

Barter's third EP, AB EP, was released on 4 September 2015. It was recorded at the Aviary, Abbotsford with Dawson producing and co-writing. It provided the single "Hypercolour", with its music video, directed by Rhys Mitchell, being premiered on NPR. Barter appeared in ABC1's TV mini-series The Beautiful Lie (2015), a modern adaptation of Leo Tolstoy's Anna Karenina.

In April 2016 Barter performed on triple j's weekly Like a Version segment, where she covered Tame Impala's track "'Cause I'm a Man". She released two singles in that year — "Far Away" in January and "Girlie Bits" in August. Both were quickly added to high rotation on national youth broadcaster triple j. She was also invited by triple j to perform at the Unearthed 10-year anniversary show in November, where she was joined onstage by Melbourne musician Ecca Vandal for a special performance of "Girlie Bits". In 2016, Barter also toured in support of the Rubens, City Calm Down and the Jezabels and held her single launches in Sydney and Brisbane.

In mid-2016 inspired by her experiences while studying 20th century music history at a university in Melbourne, she posted on her Facebook page "about how under-represented women were in the course material." She was called to a meeting: "We had a horrendous chat and they hounded me to take down the post. I had so much anxiety going to class that I stopped going." In December of that year Barter penned an op-ed, "It's About Fucking Time We Gave Female Musicians the Credit They Deserve" for Australian media website Junkee. She discussed the importance of including women in music history. The piece garnered a number of responses, including one from Yoko Ono, who re-tweeted the article.

Barter released her debut album, A Suitable Girl, in March 2017, independently on Ronnie Records via Inertia Music. It peaked at No. 17 on the ARIA Albums Chart. In February of the following year she performed at the Melbourne Zoo, for its Twilights Season, which Giselle Bueti of The AU Review praised: "There is something compelling about her stage presence, a certain awkward charm. The powerful chords mixed with delicate harmonies make for sweet listening. It's like biting into a sour lolly – that initial punch is quickly followed by sugary bliss, making your mouth water and plead for more."

In 2019 Barter announced her second full length album, Hello I'm Doing My Best. Released in October, it was generally well received. It yielded the singles "UR a Piece of Shit", "Backseat" and "Big Ones". The release was followed by a tour of Australian cities.

In March 2020, Australian radio station Triple J premiered a new song by Barter in collaboration with Oscar Dawson (from Holy Holy) titled "Four Days", as part of a COVID-19 self-isolation musical challenge nicknamed Quarantune.

Barter played her final shows in 2022. She pivoted to being a tour guide, running her own travel company called Trunk out of India.

== Personal life ==
In 2013 Barter began working with fellow Australian musician Oscar Dawson (ex-Dukes of Windsor, member of Holy Holy), as a songwriting and musical collaboration. Dawson produced Barter's latter two EPs and debut album. Barter and Dawson married in early 2016. The couple run a small independent label, Ronnie Records, which issued Barter's material, as well as work by fellow musicians Ben Wright Smith and Miles de Carteret. She often visited India and expressed a desire to live there, which ultimately happened in 2022.

== Discography ==
=== Studio albums ===
Title	Album details	Peak positions
Title	Album details	AUS
A Suitable Girl	Released: 20 March 2017; Label: Inertia Records (IR5247CD)	17
Hello, I'm Doing My Best	Released: 18 October 2019; Label: Girly Bits / Inertia Music	53

=== Live albums ===
Title	details
triple j Live At The Wireless	Released: 29 May 2020; Label: ABC Music

=== Extended plays ===
Title	EP details
Trip	Released: September 2012; Label: Ali Barter
Community	Released: 7 November 2014; Label: Ronnie Records (RON001)
AB-EP	Released: 31 August 2015; Label: Ronnie Records (RON002)
Chocolate Cake	Released: 30 April 2021; Label:

=== Singles ===
Year	Title	Album
2012	"Run You Down"	Trip
2014	"Community"	Community
2015	"Hypercolour"	AB-EP
2015	"Blood"	AB-EP
2016	"Far Away"	A Suitable Girl
2016	"Girlie Bits"	A Suitable Girl
2017	"Cigarette"	A Suitable Girl
2017	"Please Stay"	A Suitable Girl
2017	"One Foot In"	A Suitable Girl
2019	"UR a Piece of Shit"	Hello, I'm Doing My Best
2019	"Backseat"	Hello, I'm Doing My Best
2019	"Big Ones"	Hello, I'm Doing My Best
2019	"Issues" (615 Sessions)	non-album singles
2019	"Backseat" (615 Sessions)	non-album singles
2020	"Four Days" (with Oscar Dawson)	non-album singles
2020	"Twisted Up"	Chocolate Cake
2021	"You Get in My Way"	Chocolate Cake

== Awards and nominations ==
=== AIR Awards ===
The Australian Independent Record Awards (commonly known informally as AIR Awards) is an annual awards night to recognise, promote and celebrate the success of Australia's Independent Music sector.

Year	Nominee / work	Award	Result
2017	herself	Best Independent Artist	Nominated

=== J Awards ===
The J Awards are an annual series of Australian music awards that were established by the Australian Broadcasting Corporation's youth-focused radio station Triple J. They commenced in 2005.

Year	Nominee / work	Award	Result
2017	A Suitable Girl	Australian Album of the Year	Nominated

=== Music Victoria Awards ===
The Music Victoria Awards are an annual awards night celebrating Victorian music. They commenced in 2006.

Year	Nominee / work	Award	Result	Ref.
2017	Ali Barter	Best Female Artist	Nominated	

=== National Live Music Awards ===
The National Live Music Awards (NLMAs) are a broad recognition of Australia's diverse live industry, celebrating the success of the Australian live scene. The awards commenced in 2016.

Year	Nominee / work	Award	Result
2018	Ali Barter	Live Pop Act of the Year	Nominated
