= Sugar Mountain (album) =

Studio album by Jack River
- Released: 22 June 2018
- Length: 41:23
- Producer: Holly Rankin; Xavier Dunn; John Castle

Jack River chronology
Highway Songs No. 2 (2016)	Sugar Mountain (2018)	Endless Summer (2023)

Singles from Sugar Mountain
- 1. "Fool's Gold" Released: 22 June 2017; 2. "Fault Line" Released: 17 November 2017; 3. "Ballroom" Released: 27 February 2018; 4. "Limo Song" Released: 1 June 2018; 5. "Confess" Released: 31 October 2018

Singles from Sugar Mountain (Deluxe Edition)
- 1. "Adolescent" Released: 13 April 2019

Sugar Mountain is the debut studio album by Australian singer-songwriter Jack River, released on 22 June 2018.

At the AIR Awards of 2020, the album was nominated for Best Independent Pop Album or EP.

== Release and promotion ==
On 31 May 2019, the album was re-released in a deluxe edition, featuring a new single "Adolescent", a cover of Neil Young's "Sugar Mountain" and alternate versions of "Fool's Gold" and "Fault Line".

=== Singles ===
The album was supported by five singles: "Fool's Gold", released on 22 June 2017, "Fault Line", released on 17 November 2017, "Ballroom", released on 27 February 2018, "Limo Song", released on 1 June 2018, and "Confess", released on 31 October 2018.

"Adolescent" was released as the deluxe edition's sole single on 13 April 2019.

== Critical reception ==
Professional ratings
Review scores
Source	Rating
The AU Review	8.3/10
Beat Magazine	9.5/10 stars
The Newcastle Herald	4/5 stars

Sugar Mountain received "universal acclaim".

Dylan Marshall from The AU Review said: "As the first album of the artist also known as Holly Rankin, you're exposed to the sugary highs of sweet pop, whilst also left mourning within the depths of despair and complete heartbreak." adding "You're going to have a good time listening to the album, but you'll be sad, and you won't know why." Marshall concluded the review saying "The album is a pearler" and "She's managed to release an album of pure class and beauty, whilst willingly and knowingly making herself open to the public gaze.".

Alexander Crowden of Beat Magazine said: "To put it simply, River has released one of the greatest Australian debut albums of the past decade. Every single moment on Sugar Mountain is a surefire winner, and there's an instant appeal apparent on each of the 13 tracks adorning River's debut. Her glorious voice cascades over stunning soundscapes that dance the fine line between intimate and cinematic."

Josh Leeson of The Newcastle Herald said: "Sugar Mountain is at once intensely emotional and a shiny fabrication. It's taken... five years to build this songbook which aims to paint an alternate childhood from her own, which was marred by the death of her 11-year-old sister.".

Triple J said: "Each song takes you into a melancholic pastel dream, recalling musical influences of her formative teenage years. You can hear the folk tinges of Neil Young and Joni Mitchell taken from her parents' record collection alongside the self-navigated discoveries of gritty guitars and power-pop hooks".

Tim Lamber from Stack Magazine said "If you look only at Sugar Mountain through the sparkling, rose-coloured glasses that River has draped over the album, you might not be rewarded with uncovering the confidential and vulnerable world she has created – but which she is encouraging you to discover."

Tina Odukoyat from Never Enough Notes said: "The electropop album, inspired by her favourite Neil Young song, includes intense guitar motifs, heavy drum riffs and crystal clear vocals, all perfectly apt for a glitter filled festival headliner spot." He added, "Sugar Mountain is a personal and bold debut album that laments River's lost youth, yet simultaneously oozes a glowing sense of hope. It's a record that deserves to be performed on a big festival stage in all its sparkly and glittery glory".

=== Year-end lists ===
Sugar Mountain on year-end lists
Publication	List	Rank	Ref.
Triple J	Triple J's Top 10 Albums of 2018	9	

== Commercial performance ==
Sugar Mountain debuted and peaked at number 11 on the ARIA Albums Chart for the chart dated 2 July 2018, before falling 70 positions the following week.

== Track listing ==
Sugar Mountain track listing
No.	Title	Writer(s)	Length
1.	"Her Smile"	Holly Rankin	3:02
2.	"Ballroom"	Rankin	3:15
3.	"Confess"	Holly Rankin; Alex Burnett	3:22
4.	"Limo Song"	Holly Rankin; Rowin White; Xavier Dunn	3:46
5.	"Fool's Gold"	Holly Rankin	4:18
6.	"Mars" (Reuben Rankin)	Holly Rankin	0:59
7.	"So High"	Holly Rankin	3:24
8.	"Stardust & Rust"	Holly Rankin	3:19
9.	"Saturn" (Reuben Rankin)	Holly Rankin	0:33
10.	"Fault Line"	Rankin; Dunn	2:51
11.	"Fields"	Holly Rankin	2:51
12.	"Constellation Ball"	Holly Rankin	3:45
13.	"In Infinity"	Holly Rankin	4:48

Sugar Mountain — Deluxe edition (bonus tracks)
No.	Title	Writer(s)	Length
14.	"Adolescent"	Holly Rankin	2:44
15.	"Sugar Mountain"	Neil Young	3:13
16.	"Fool's Gold" (acoustic)	Holly Rankin	3:29
17.	"Fault Line" (Gear 1 Version)	Holly Rankin; Dunn	3:18

== Awards and nominations ==
At the 32nd Annual ARIA Music Awards, the album was nominated for two awards; Best Pop Release and Breakthrough Artist. Rankin, Xavier Dunn and John Castle were additionally nominated for Engineer of the Year for their production on the album.

Year	Nominee / work	Award	Result
2018	Sugar Mountain	Breakthrough Artist	Nominated
2018	Sugar Mountain	Best Pop Release	Nominated
2018	Holly Rankin, Xavier Dunn & John Castle (for Sugar Mountain)	Engineer of the Year	Nominated

== Charts ==
Chart performance for Sugar Mountain
Chart (2018)	Peak position
Australian Albums (ARIA)	11

== Release history ==
Sugar Mountain release details
Region	Date	Format	Label	Edition	Catalogue	Ref.
Australia	22 June 2018	CD; digital download; streaming	I Oh You	Standard	IOU268	
Australia	22 June 2018	Limited edition vinyl	I Oh You	Standard	IOU269	
Australia	31 May 2019	Deluxe LP; digital download; streaming	I Oh You	Deluxe edition		
