= Fool's Gold (Jack River song) =

Single by Jack River

from the album Sugar Mountain
- Released: 22 June 2017
- Length: 4:17
- Label: I OH YOU
- Songwriter(s): Holly Rankin

Jack River singles chronology
"Palo Alto" (2016)	"Fool's Gold" (2017)	"Fault Lines" (2017)

Music video
- "Fool's Gold" on YouTube

"Fool's Gold" is a song by Australian singer songwriter, Jack River. It was released in June 2017 as the lead single from River's debut studio album, Sugar Mountain. It was certified platinum in Australia in 2020.

Jack River said "I was alone in New York, chasing shiny things. The verses were spinning around my head. I was annoyed at myself for falling for the same things over again without them giving back. But I also knew how human it was to feel like that, and how I'd probably come up against this feeling again and again. I wanted to write a song for that emotion – the relentless humanity in thinking something is gold when it just isn't."

== Certifications ==
Region	Certification	Certified units/sales
Australia (ARIA)	Platinum	70,000^{‡}
^{‡} Sales+streaming figures based on certification alone.
