= Stack (magazine) =

American sports magazine

- Categories: Sports; lifestyle
- Frequency: Three Times Per Year
- Circulation: 875,000
- Founder: Nick Palazzo and Chad Zimmerman
- First issue: February 2005
- Company: STACK Media, Inc.
- Country: United States
- Based in: Cleveland, Ohio
- Language: English
- Website: Stack.com

Stack is a sports performance and athlete lifestyle publication targeted at high school student athletes. Double issues of STACK Magazine are distributed free of cost three times per year to 13,500 high schools nationwide (about 75% of all U.S. high schools with sports programs), resulting in a readership of 5.4 million athletes.

== Content ==
The magazine covers a wide variety of topics, including training, nutrition, sports skills, athlete lifestyle and motivation. The articles are often sport-specific in nature, covering nearly all sports including football, basketball, baseball, track, soccer, volleyball, swimming, wrestling, softball, lacrosse, tennis, and hockey.

== History ==
STACK Media, Inc. was founded by Nick Palazzo and Chad Zimmerman, both former collegiate athletes, in Cleveland, Ohio in February 2005. STACK Magazine's premier issue featuring a young LeBron James on the cover was printed and distributed shortly thereafter. STACK was originally financed privately, helped by a $15,000 win from a 2003 competition organized by Northeast Ohio's Council of Smaller Enterprises. Further financing has come from its current Chairman and from private equity firm CapitalWorks LLC of Cleveland. The extensive readership, mostly males in the age range 12–24, has attracted major Blue Chip advertisers including Nike, Inc., Reebok, Gatorade, ASICS, New Balance, Under Armour, Milk, Navy and the United States Army.
