= Gypsy & the Cat =

Australian pop duo

Gypsy & The Cat
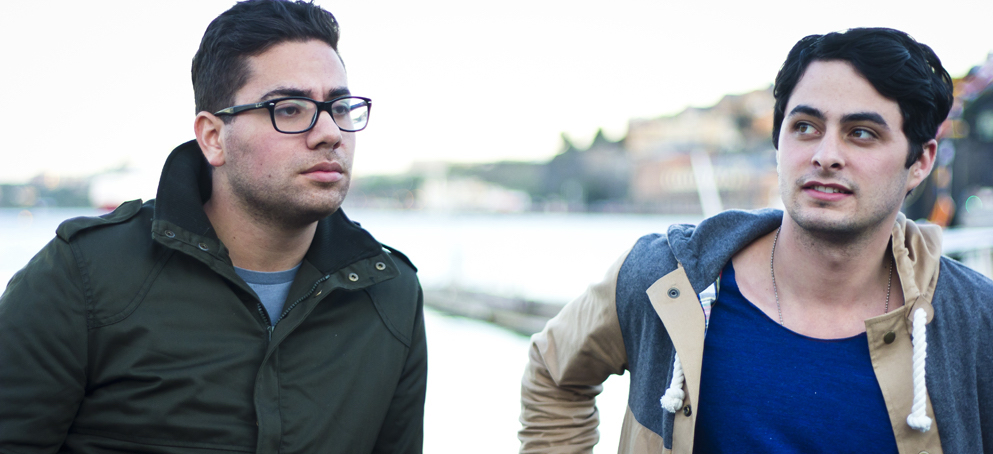
- Gypsy & The Cat in Sweden

Background information
- Origin: Melbourne, Victoria, Australia
- Genres: Indie pop, dream pop
- Years active: 2008–2016, 2023-present
- Labels: Sony, Alsatian Music
- Members: Xavier Bacash; Lionel Towers

GATC (better known by their original name Gypsy & The Cat) are an Australian indie and dream pop duo formed in Melbourne by former DJs Xavier Bacash and Lionel Towers. The band rebranded in 2023 after returning from a seven-year hiatus, likely due to changing perspectives around the term "gypsy". The band is now listed as GATC fka Gypsy & The Cat on their Bandcamp page.

== History ==
=== 2010-2011: Gilgamesh ===
Gypsy & The Cat's first live performance was in 2010 in London, where they were based for much of that year. They released their debut album in November 2010, "Gilgamesh", played in UK and Australia, and have received significant airplay including on Triple J, Nova and Fox during 2011. Gypsy & The Cat were an Unearthed J Award nominee in 2010 and finished the year with three hit songs on the station's Top 100 for the Year, their highest being "Jona Vark" at 64. The duo were booked to play Coachella, but pulled out the last minute due to issues with their label, Sony Music.

During 2010–2012, they extensively toured Australia, Japan, Germany, Switzerland, Sweden, Denmark, the Netherlands and Hong Kong and performed further concerts in the UK. Their first album, Gilgamesh, was awarded a gold record in Australia.

In October 2012 Gypsy & The Cat started their own record label Alsatian Music. They independently released their second album, The Late Blue. Produced by the band themselves and mixed by Dave Fridman (MGMT, Flaming Lips, Tame Impala), they also collaborated with director Krozm for the first single "Sorry", with artist Mark Alsweiler providing the album artwork. The second single from The Late Blue, "Bloom", was used for Europe Canon's Power to Your Next Step campaign and in Australia as the feature in the Big M Kakao. In 2013 the band took the album across Australia and the US on headline tours as well as playing Future Music Festival, joining the line-up with bands such as the Stone Roses and Bloc Party.

The band completed recording of their third album Virtual Islands in mid-2016, which was scheduled for a global digital release on 5 August 2016. The first single from the album, "Inside Your Mind", was released in February 2016 on iTunes and Spotify and was largely met with positive reception. Also met with positive reception was the second single "I Just Wanna Be Somebody Else", which was released in April 2016 and achieved number 1 on the Hypem Charts, accompanied by a two-part video shot in Tokyo encompassing both singles.

=== 2012-2015: The Late Blue ===
The Late Blue was released in Australia on 19 October 2012. Towers and Bacash worked on this record at a farm studio. On 20 September, Gypsy & The Cat released the dates for their Australian tour, which commenced after the release of the album. In an interview with music journalist Nick Milligan for the Maitland Mercury, Towers said: "It's [the new record] probably a bit more 'summery'. There's a little bit of world [music] influence in it. It's definitely different to the first album in many ways - there's lots more major chords. With Gilgamesh there were more minor chords. We're just doing what we want to do, like we always have. On the next album we might do something even different, but I think [on this album] we needed to do something a little more 'left' than the first album". The album was released independently, rather than with a major label.

=== 2016:Virtual Islands and break up ===
Gypsy & The Cat's third album was released on 5 August 2016. According to an article written in The Music online publication, the band have been influenced by their travels to Japan for the album. "According to Bacash, the cultural and environmental upheaval (in Japan) was just what the doctor ordered for the band's head-space in making this record." The album features mixing assistance by Dave Fridmann and Tony Espie (Avalanches, Cut Copy) and mastering by Mike Marsh (Chemical Brothers, Basement Jaxx) and John Davis (Led Zeppelin Re-masters, Foals).

After the release of Virtual Islands the duo decided to split ending the band on a high note. They made an announcement on Facebook on 14 July 2016 that they were going split after the final tour. 'We feel like it is even clearer to us that we should move on, on a high and both focus on other projects we have been working on. Lionel is going to be moving into the world of film scoring and I have a solo project under an alias with music coming soon'.

=== 2023: Return and new name ===
On July 31 2023, the duo announced an official return on their Facebook page: "Same band, same sound, slightly new name. Gypsy & The Cat is back in a new incarnation, 'GATC'. After 7 years, we have been in the studio recording new music together."

== Discography ==
=== Studio albums ===
Title	Details	Peak chart positions			Certification
Title	Details	AUS	GER	SWI	Certification
Gilgamesh	Released: 12 November 2010; Label: Sony Music Australia	14	43	54	ARIA: Gold
The Late Blue	Released: 19 October 2012; Label: Alsatian Music	23	—	—	
Virtual Islands	Released: 5 August 2016; Label: Alsatian Music	—	—	—	

== Awards and nominations ==
=== ARIA Music Awards ===
The ARIA Music Awards is an annual awards ceremony that recognises excellence, innovation, and achievement across all genres of Australian music. They commenced in 1987.

Year	Nominee / work	Award	Result	Ref.
2011	Gilgamesh	Breakthrough Artist - Album	Nominated	
2011	Gilgamesh	Best Pop Release	Nominated	
