= Edwin White =

American painter (1817–1877)

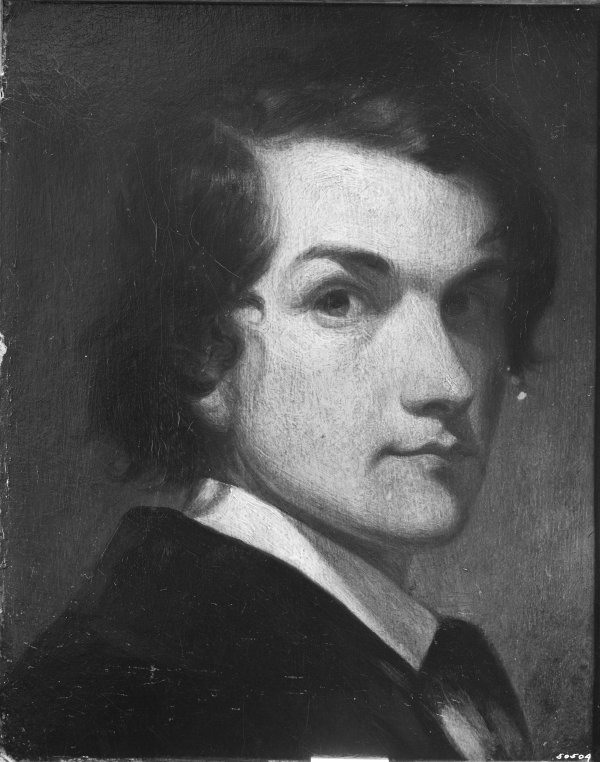
- Self-Portrait at Nineteen by Edwin White, c.1836
- Born: 21 May 1817; South Hadley, Massachusetts
- Died: 7 June 1877 (aged 60); Saratoga Springs
- Education: Paris, Düsseldorf, Rome, and Florence
- Known for: Painter
- Movement: Academic

Edwin White (May 21, 1817 in South Hadley, Massachusetts – June 7, 1877 in Saratoga Springs, New York) was an American painter.

== Life and career ==
Edwin White studied in Paris, Düsseldorf, Rome, and Florence and later taught at the National Academy of Design, in New York. He studied under several different American and European painting masters, attended lectures at a Medical College in New York City to study anatomy, and attended Amherst College where he received an A.M. by the end of 1856.

Works by White, mostly in storage, are in the collections of Yale; The Metropolitan Museum of Art; Museum of Fine Arts, Boston; the Mount Holyoke College Art Museum; and the New-York Historical Society.

A notable moment in White's career was noted in October, 1855, when he met the painter Sanford Robinson Gifford in Paris and told Gifford that he was about to return to New York, was destitute, had no commissions, and might have to return to portrait painting. However, when White did return to his New York studio, he went to work on his Mayflower painting, which he sold off the easel for $1,000, and a new and successful stage of his career was launched. His painting of Washington resigning was painted on commission by the state of Maryland, for $6,000, when White had returned to Paris.

The Mayflower painting was the basis for a 5-cent stamp issued in 1920 as part of the Pilgrim Tercentenary. An apparently later, unfinished painting of the same subject, from 1867, was left by the artist to Yale, and the university art museum has a collection of some 24 sketches White made preparatory to painting.

The artist was cousin to Andrew Dickson White, the first president of Cornell University.

== Influential works ==
- The Compact of the Mayflower 1855-56
- Washington Resigning his Commission 1858
- Pocahontas Informing John Smith of the Conspiracy of the Indians
- Major Anderson Raising the Flag at Fort Sumter 1862.

== Gallery ==
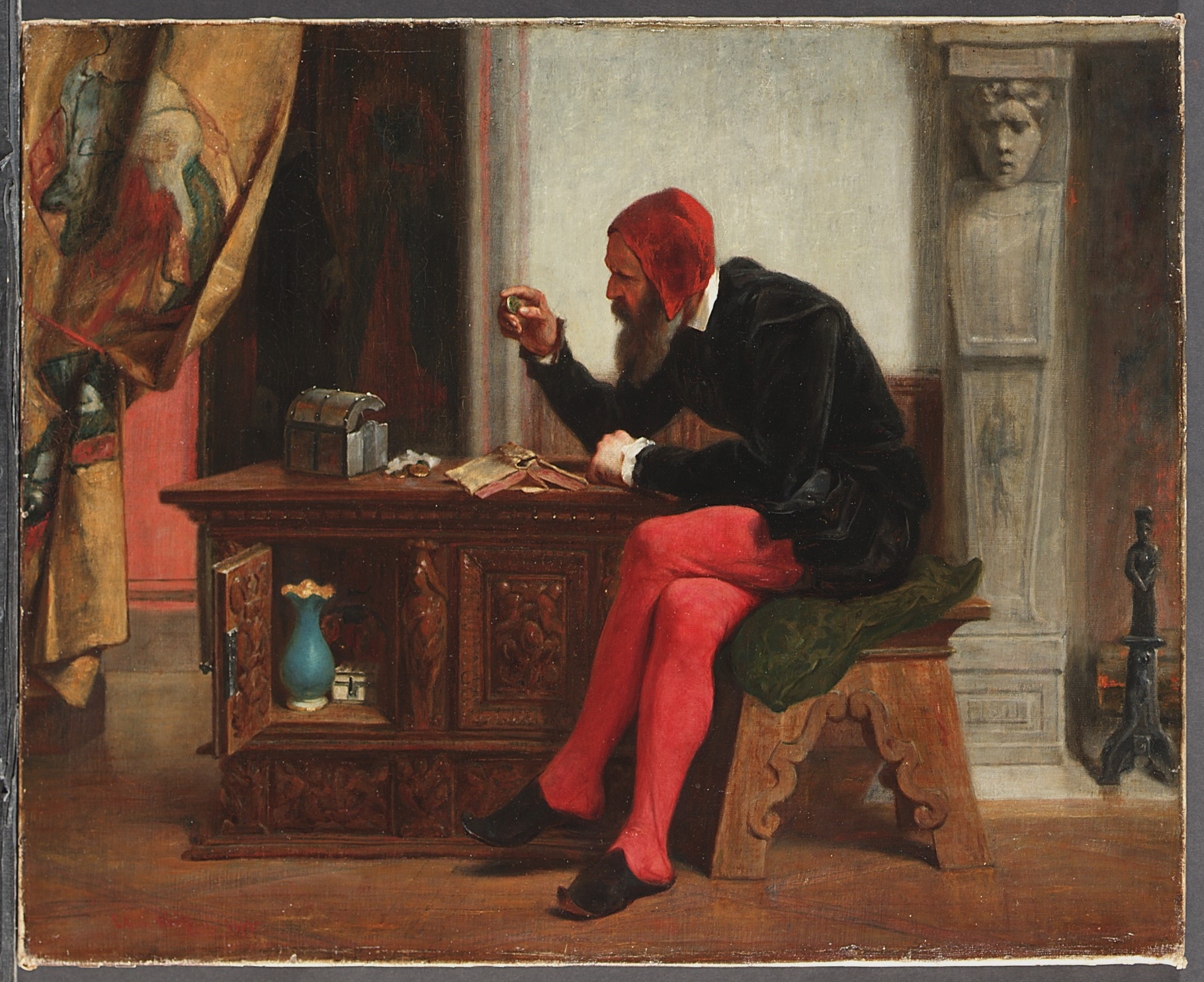
The Antiquary, 1855

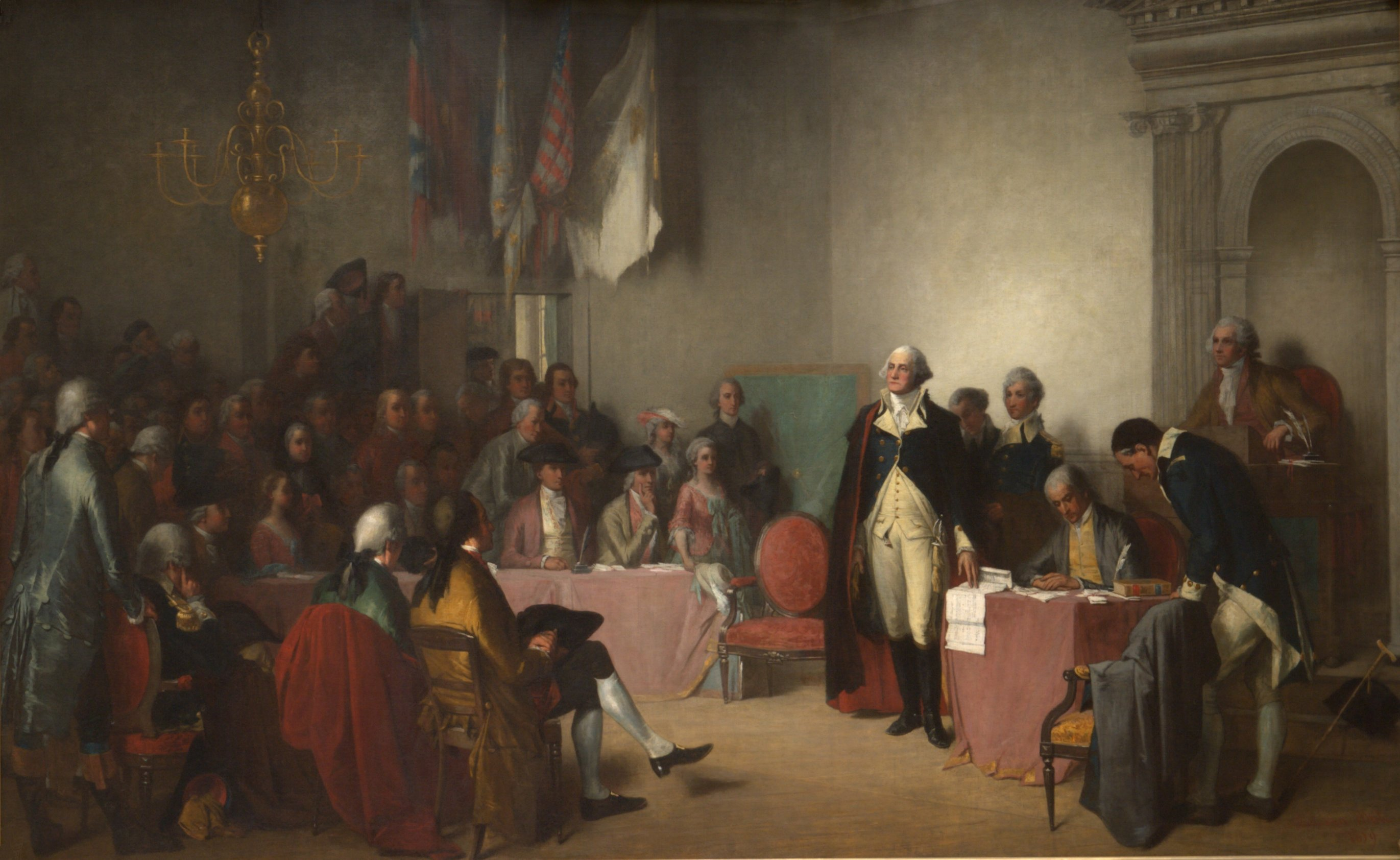
Washington Resigning His Commission, 1858

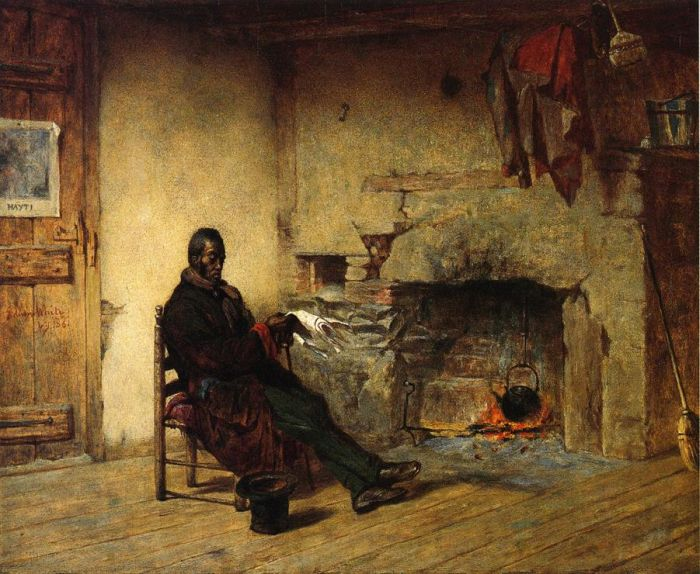
Thoughts of Liberia - Emancipation, 1861

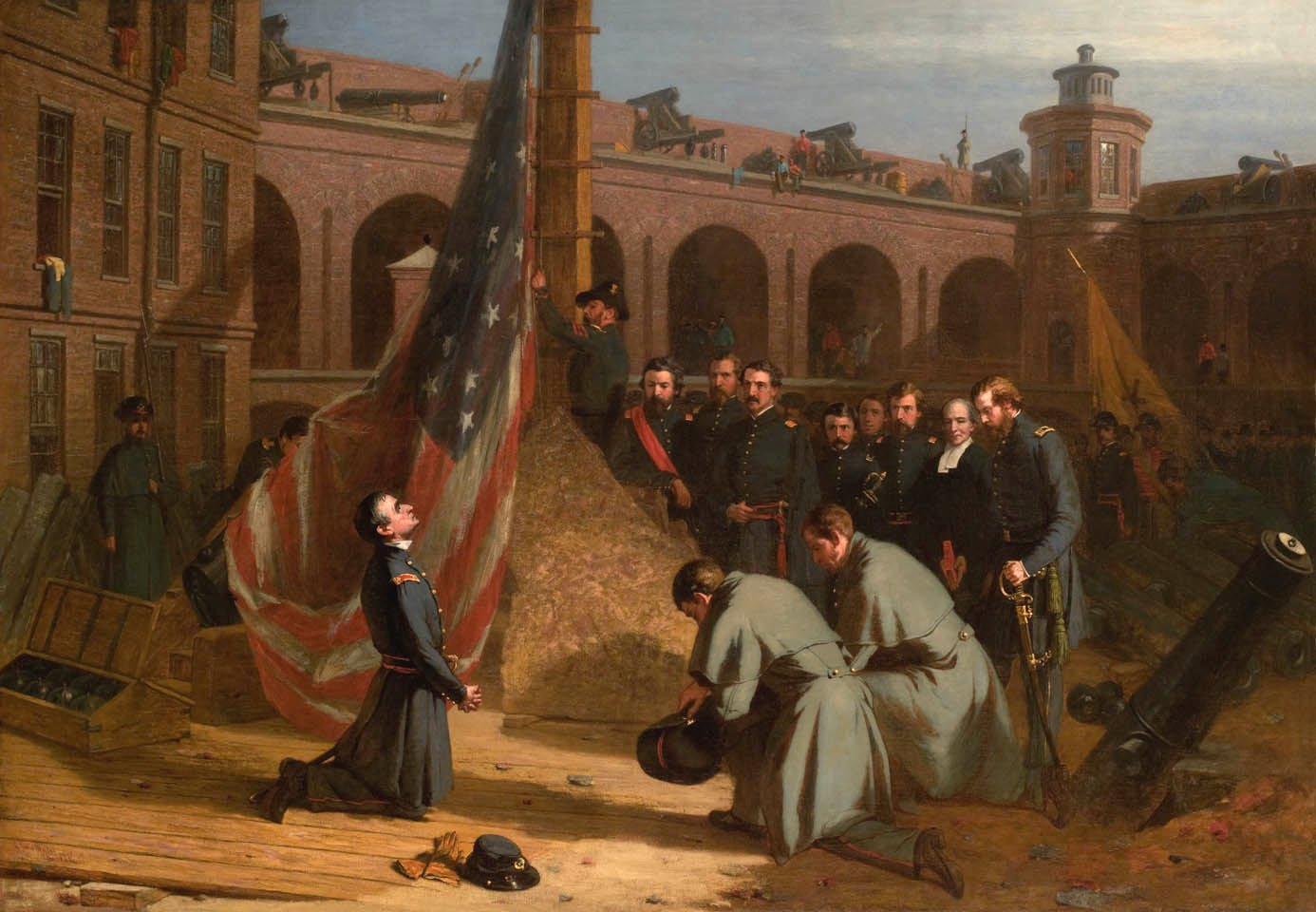
Major Anderson Raising the Flag at Fort Sumter, 1862

== Minor works ==
- Fisher boy, Florence Griswold Museum, Old Lyme, Connecticut. A sentimental genre subject of a boy and his dog.
