= The Gem (disambiguation) =

The Gem may refer to:

- The Gem, (1907–1939), a story paper
- The Gem, Bayer abbreviation of the star Theta Geminorum
- The Gem, a 2026 album by Julia Jacklin
