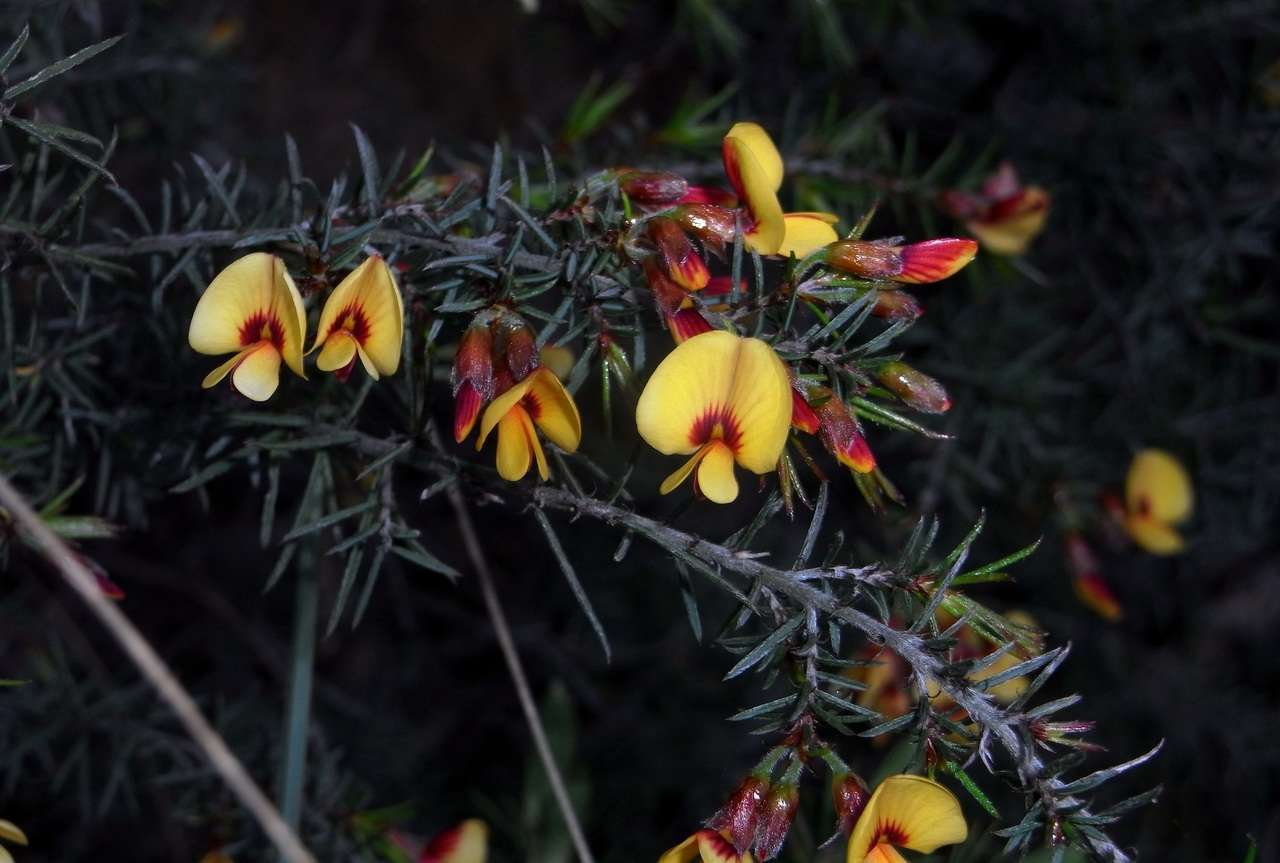

Conservation status
- Vulnerable (EPBC Act)

Scientific classification
- Kingdom: Plantae
- Clade: Tracheophytes
- Clade: Angiosperms
- Clade: Eudicots
- Clade: Rosids
- Order: Fabales
- Family: Fabaceae
- Subfamily: Faboideae
- Genus: Pultenaea
- Species: P. williamsoniana

Binomial name
- Pultenaea williamsoniana J.H.Willis

Synonyms
- Pultenaea angustifolia var. viscosa J.H.Willis

= Pultenaea williamsoniana =

Williamson's bush pea

Species of flowering plant

Pultenaea williamsoniana, commonly known as Williamson's bush-pea, is a species of flowering plant in the family Fabaceae and is endemic to a restricted area of Victoria, Australia. It is a slender, erect shrub with its stems covered with white hairs, and has cylindrical, grooved leaves and yellow to orange and red, pea-like flowers arranged in clusters on the ends of short side branches.

== Description ==
Pultenaea williamsoniana is a slender, erect shrub that typically grows to a height of up to 3 m (9.8 ft) and has its stems covered with white hairs. The leaves are cylindrical with a groove along the upper surface, 6–15 mm (0.24–0.59 in) long, 0.2–0.5 mm (0.0079–0.0197 in) wide tapering to a sharp point and with dark brown stipules 1.5–2 mm (0.059–0.079 in) long at the base. The flowers are yellow to orange and red, arranged in clusters of three to five on the ends of short side branches with sticky round bracteoles 2.0–2.5 mm (0.079–0.098 in) long at the base of the sepal tube. The sepals are 4–5 mm (0.16–0.20 in) long, the standard petal is 10.0–11.8 mm (0.39–0.46 in) long and 9–11 mm (0.35–0.43 in) wide, the wings 9.8–10.5 mm (0.39–0.41 in) long and the keel 9.3–10 mm (0.37–0.39 in) long. Flowering occurs from September to October and the fruit is a pod 5.5–6.2 mm (0.22–0.24 in) long.

== Taxonomy and naming ==
Pultenaea williamsoniana was first formally described in 1967 James Hamlyn Willis in the journal Muelleria from specimens he collected on Mount Zero in October 1927. The specific epithet (williamsoniana) honours Herbert Bennett Williamson.

== Distribution and habitat ==
Williamson's bush-pea grows on rocky slopes in heathy understorey in the northern Grampians.

== Conservation status ==
This peas is listed as "vulnerable" under the Australian Government Environment Protection and Biodiversity Conservation Act 1999 and the Victorian Government Flora and Fauna Guarantee Act 1988. A National Recovery Plan has been prepared. The main threats to the species include inappropriate fire regimes, visitor pressure and road works.
