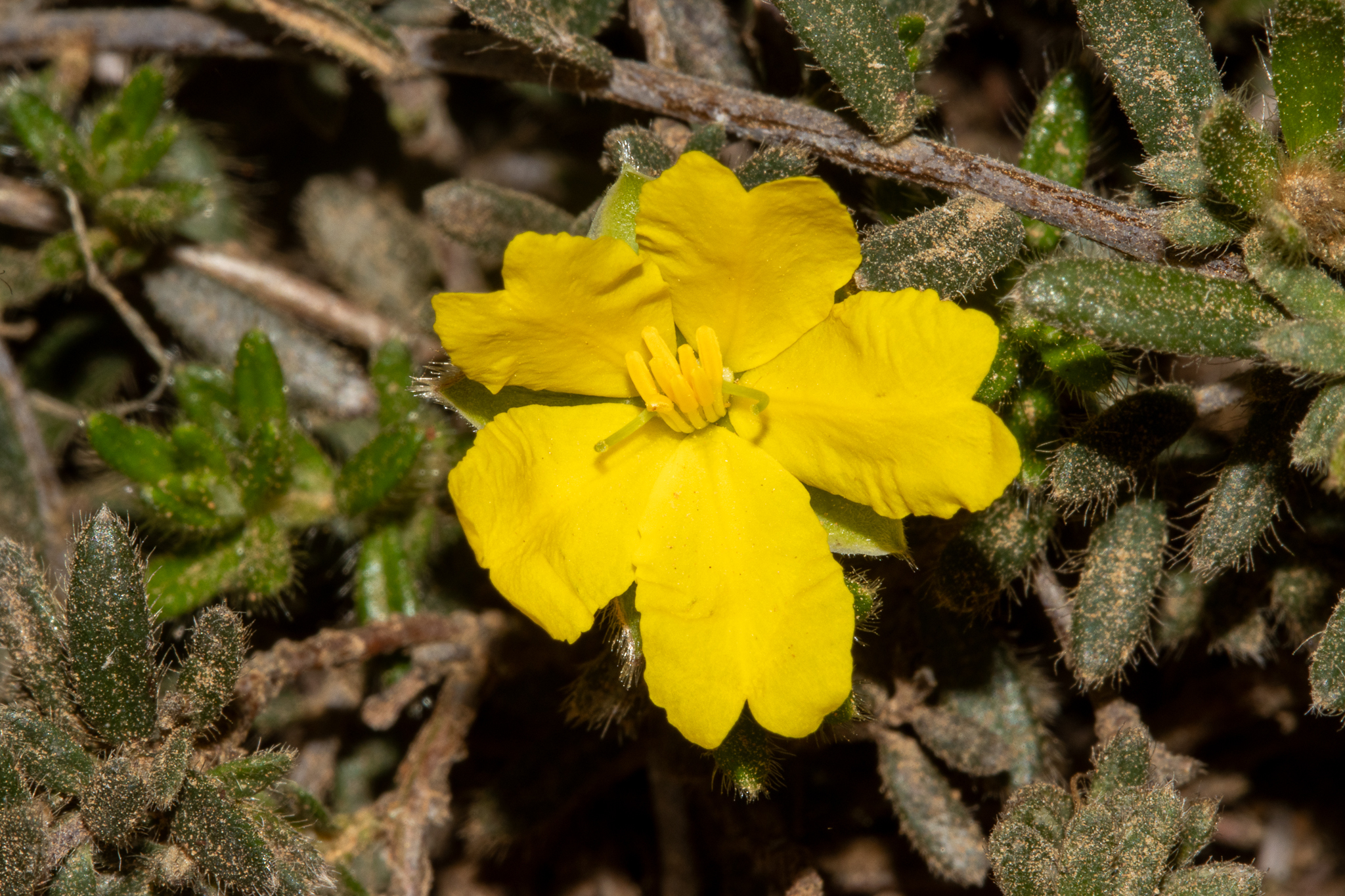
- Near Grampians National Park, Victoria

Scientific classification
- Kingdom: Plantae
- Clade: Embryophytes
- Clade: Tracheophytes
- Clade: Spermatophytes
- Clade: Angiosperms
- Clade: Eudicots
- Order: Dilleniales
- Family: Dilleniaceae
- Genus: Hibbertia
- Species: H. humifusa

Binomial name
- Hibbertia humifusa Toelken

= Hibbertia humifusa =

Species of plant

Hibbertia humifusa is a species of flowering plant in the family Dilleniaceae and is endemic to central Victoria, Australia. It is a prostrate to low-lying shrub with linear to elliptic leaves, and bright yellow flowers with six to ten stamens arranged in a cluster on one side of the two carpels.

== Description ==
Hibbertia humifusa is a prostrate to low-lying shrub that typically grows to a height of up to 40 cm (16 in) with wiry branches. The leaves are linear to elliptic, 5–9 mm (0.20–0.35 in) long and 0.9–3 mm (0.035–0.118 in) wide on a short petiole, the edges of the leaves turned down. The flowers are arranged singly on the ends of the branchlets and are sessile or on a peduncle up to 24 mm (0.94 in) long, with a bract 2.2–3.7 mm (0.087–0.146 in) long. The five sepals are woolly-hairy, 3.3–9.4 mm (0.13–0.37 in) long and the five petals are bright yellow and egg-shaped with the narrower end towards the base, 5.8–12.4 mm (0.23–0.49 in) long. There are six to ten stamens arranged in a single cluster on one side of the two carpels.

== Taxonomy ==
Hibbertia humifusa was first formally described in 1862 by Ferdinand von Mueller in his book The Plants Indigenous to the Colony of Victoria from specimens collected "in barren scrubby plains near Mount Zero". The specific epithet (humifusa) means "low-lying".

In 1995, Hellmut R. Toelken described three subspecies in the Journal of the Adelaide Botanic Gardens and the names are accepted by the Australian Plant Census:

- Hibbertia humifusa subsp. debilis Toelken has sepals up to 3.6 mm (0.14 in) long, the outer sepals 1.3–3 mm (0.051–0.118 in) wide;
- Hibbertia humifusa subsp. erigens Toelken has sepals 4.2–7.5 mm (0.17–0.30 in) long, the outer sepals 1.3–3 mm (0.051–0.118 in) wide;
- Hibbertia humifusa F.Muell. subsp. humifusa has its outer sepals 3.5–5.8 mm (0.14–0.23 in) wide.

== Distribution and habitat ==
Subspecies debilis is only known from near Dergholm where it grows in wet heathland and subspecies erigens from the Euroa-Mansfield area where it grows in woodland. The autonym (humifusa) grows in dryish woodland in scattered locations around central Victoria, including in the Grampians and near Stawell.

== Conservation status ==
Subspecies debilis and erigens are listed as "vulnerable" under the Australian Government Environment Protection and Biodiversity Conservation Act 1999 and the Victorian Government Flora and Fauna Guarantee Act 1988. A national recovery plan has been prepared for subspecies erigens.

== See also ==
- List of Hibbertia species
