= Drifting Clouds =

Drifting Clouds may refer to:

- Ukigumo ('Drifing Clouds'), several uses of the Japanese term
- Drifting Clouds (film), 1996 Finnish film by Aki Kaurismäki
- Drifting Clouds (band), an Australian indie rock band from Arnhem Land
