= Swap meet (disambiguation) =

Swap meet is a type of informal market that provides space for vendors to sell previously owned (second-hand) goods in contrast to direct from manufacturing retail

Swap meet may also refer to:

- Swapmeet (band), an Australian indie rock group
- "Swap Meet" (CSI), an episode of the television program CSI
- Swap Meet (film), an American film
- "Swap Meet" (song), a song by Nirvana
- Swap Meet (The Price Is Right), a segment game on the game show The Price Is Right
