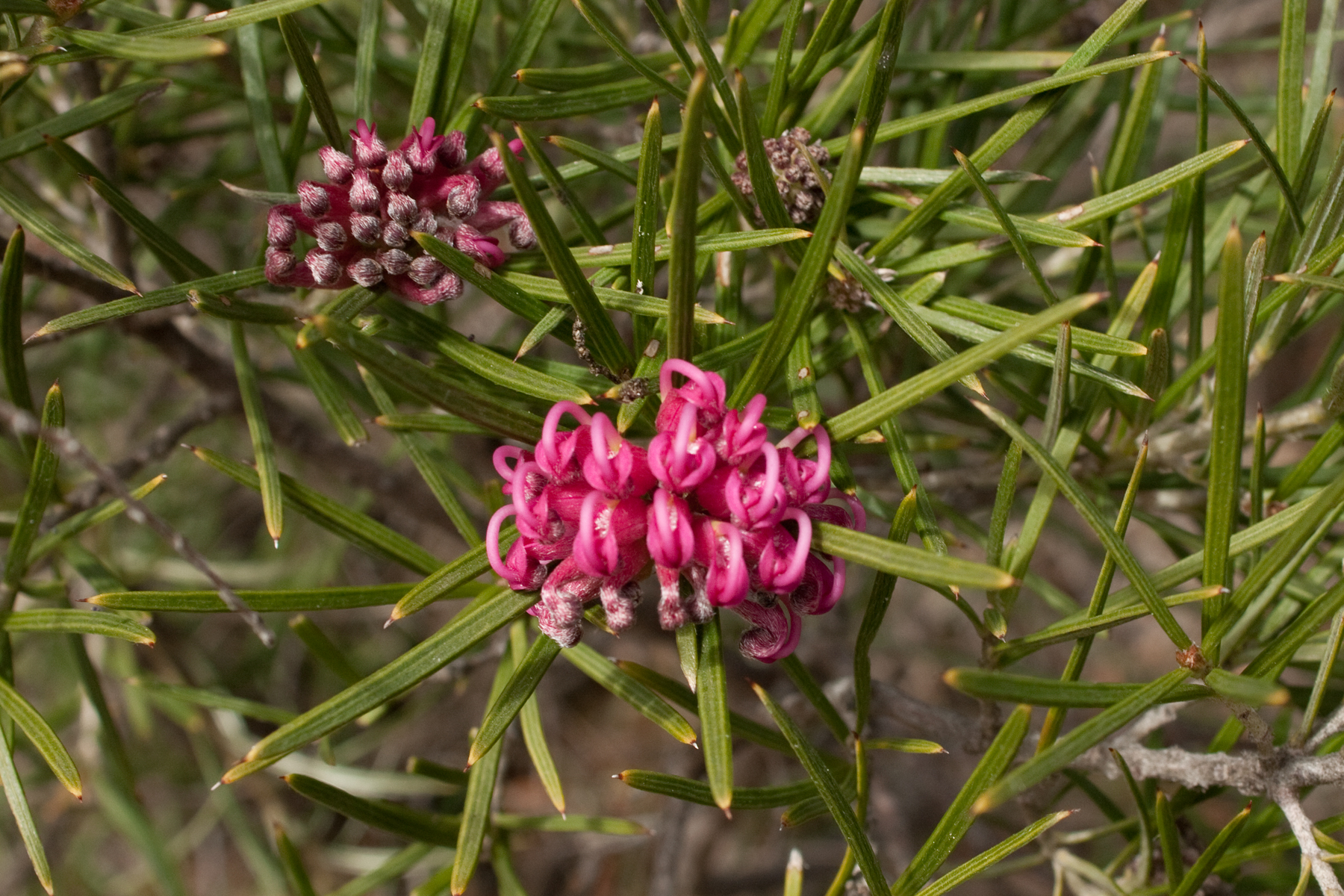
- Grevillea confertifolia

Scientific classification
- Kingdom: Plantae
- Clade: Embryophytes
- Clade: Tracheophytes
- Clade: Spermatophytes
- Clade: Angiosperms
- Clade: Eudicots
- Order: Proteales
- Family: Proteaceae
- Genus: Grevillea
- Species: G. confertifolia

Binomial name
- Grevillea confertifolia F.Muell.

= Grevillea confertifolia =

Grampians grevillea

Species of shrub endemic to Victoria, Australia

Grevillea confertifolia, commonly known as Grampians grevillea or dense-leaf grevillea, is a species of flowering plant in the family Proteaceae and is endemic to the Grampians in Victoria, Australia. It is a spreading, often dense shrub with linear to narrowly oblong leaves, and reddish-purple flowers.

== Description ==
Grevillea confertifolia is a spreading, often dense shrub that typically grows to a height of up to 1 m (3 ft 3 in). Its leaves are linear to narrowly oblong, 10–45 mm (0.39–1.77 in) long and 0.7–2.0 mm (0.028–0.079 in) wide with the edges turned down or rolled under, obscuring all but the mid-vein on the lower surface. The flowers are usually arranged in groups of more than thirty on the ends of branchlets and are reddish-purple, the pistil 10.5–12.5 mm (0.41–0.49 in) long with a pink to reddish-mauve style. Flowering occurs from August to December and the fruit is a glabrous, oblong follicle 11–12 mm (0.43–0.47 in) long.

== Taxonomy ==
Grevillea confertifolia was first formally described in 1854 by Ferdinand von Mueller in Transactions of the Philosophical Society of Victoria from specimens collected between the summit of Mount William and rocky ridges towards Mount Zero. The specific epithet (confertifolia) means "crowded-leaved".

== Distribution and habitat ==
Grampians grevillea grows on rocky sites in woodland, or the shrub layer near streams, and is endemic to the Grampians Range in Victoria.

== Conservation status ==
The species is listed as endangered in Victoria under the Flora and Fauna Guarantee Act 1988 and as rare in the Victorian Government Department of Environment and Primary Industries "List of rare or threatened plants in Victoria - 2014".

== Use in horticulture ==
Grevillea confertifolia is commercially available, can be grown in a variety of soil types, is frost-tolerant and drought-tolerant when established. It can be propagated from seed or from semi-hardwood cuttings using rooting hormone solution.
