= Don't Let the Kids Win =

Studio album by Julia Jacklin
- Released: 7 October 2016
- Genre: Indie rock, Folk rock
- Length: 43:04
- Label: Polyvinyl Record Co. • Transgressive Records • Liberation Records
- Producer: Ben Edwards

Julia Jacklin chronology
Don't Let the Kids Win (2016)	Crushing (2019)

Singles from Don't Let the Kids Win
- 1. "Don't Let the Kids Win" Released: 2016; 2. "Pool Party" Released: 2016; 3. "Leadlight" Released: 2016; 4. "Coming of Age" Released: 2016; 5. "Hay Plain" Released: 2016

Don't Let the Kids Win is the debut studio album by Australian singer/songwriter Julia Jacklin. It was released in October 2016 under Polyvinyl Record Co., Transgressive Records and Liberation Records.

At the J Awards of 2016, the album was nominated for Australian Album of the Year. At the ARIA Music Awards of 2017, the album was nominated for Best Female Artist and Best Cover Art.

== Critical reception ==
At Metacritic, which assigns a normalised rating out of 100 to reviews from mainstream publications, the album received an average score of 81, based on 12 reviews. El Hunt of DIY praised the album, noting that "'Don't Let the Kids Win' shines brightest for its clear, and charismatic narrative voice." Lauren Down of Under the Radar gave the album a positive review, saying "It's in examining her own life through different colored lenses that this album becomes something remarkable." The Guardian's Michael Hann wrote "Don't Let the Kids Win feels very much like one of those albums that will slowly creep into the affections of a large number of people; it's that lovely."

== Track listing ==
All tracks are written by Julia Jacklin

No.	Title	Length
1.	"Pool Party"	4:16
2.	"Lead Light"	3:43
3.	"Coming of Age"	3:20
4.	"Elizabeth"	3:37
5.	"Motherland"	5:14
6.	"Small Talk"	3:30
7.	"L.A. Dream"	3:29
8.	"Sweet Step"	2:51
9.	"Same Airport, Different Man"	3:03
10.	"Hay Plain"	5:58
11.	"Don't Let the Kids Win"	4:03
Total length:		43:04

== Charts ==
Chart (2016)	Peak position
Australian Albums (ARIA)	42

== Personnel ==
- Julia Jacklin - vocals, guitar
- Eddie Boyd - guitar
- Tom Stephens - drums, bass
- Mitchell Lloyd Scott - bass
- Joe McCallum - drums
- Ben Edwards - production, mixing
- Nick McKinlay - photography
