= 2026 J Awards =

22nd Annual J Awards

- Awarded for: The best in Australian music
- Date: 12 November 2026
- Presented by: Various

Highlights
- Most nominations: Genesis Owusu; (3)
- Website: abc.net.au/triplej/

The 2026 J Awards are the 22nd annual J Awards, established by the Australian Broadcasting Corporation's youth-focused radio station Triple J. It awards the best albums, artists, live acts and music videos in the Australian music scene, as determined by the network's teams.

The eligibility period was for releases between 1 November 2025 and 31 October 2026. Nominees were announced on 28 October 2026, and the winners were announced on 12 November 2026.

== Awards ==
=== Australian Album of the Year ===
List of Australian Album of the Year nominees
Artist	Album	Result
Genesis Owusu	Redstar Wu & the Worldwide Scourge	Won
Bugs	Head Noise	Nominated
Ecca Vandal	Looking for People to Unfollow	Nominated
Julia Jacklin	The Gem	Nominated
Kayps	Bunuba Baby	Nominated
Nerve	Growing Pains	Nominated
South Summit	Run It Back	Nominated
Swapmeet	Mount Zero	Nominated
Sycco	Look Up	Nominated
Troye Sivan	She's the Best	Nominated

=== Australian Live Act of the Year ===
List of Australian Live Act of the Year nominees
Artist	Result
Ninajirachi	Won
Ecca Vandal	Nominated
Genesis Owusu	Nominated
Miss Kaninna	Nominated
Tame Impala	Nominated

=== Australian Video of the Year ===
Co-presented with Rage.

List of Australian Video of the Year nominees
Artist	Song	Director	Result
Genesis Owusu	"Stampede"	Isaac Brown	Won
Drifting Clouds	"Rarrandharr"	Matt Sav	Nominated
Elektronik Girl Epic	"I Love Stealing from Woolies"	Elektronik Girl Epic	Nominated
Julia Jacklin	"The Hardest Thing"	Danny Cohen	Nominated
Miss Kaninna	"Backstreets"	Claudia Sangiorgi Dalimore	Nominated

=== Unearthed Artist of the Year ===
List of Unearthed Artist of the Year nominees
Artist	Result
Devaura	Nominated
Kayps	Nominated
Public Figures	Nominated
Swapmeet	Won
The Tullamarines	Nominated

=== Double J Artist of the Year ===
Presented by Double J, a sister station of Triple J.

List of Double J Artist of the Year nominees
Artist	Result
Vika & Linda	Won
The Avalanches	Nominated
Eddy Current Suppression Ring	Nominated
Mulga Bore Hard Rock	Nominated
Rowena Wise	Nominated
