= The Tullamarines =

Australian indie pop band

- Origin: Adelaide, South Australia, Australia
- Genre: Indie pop
- Years active: 2021–present
- Members: Lucinda Machin; Angus Purvis; Josh Thomas; Benny Waltho
- Website: thetullamarines.com.au

The Tullamarines are an Australian indie pop band formed in Adelaide in 2021. The group consists of Lucinda Machin, Angus Purvis, Josh Thomas, and Ben Waltho. They have released two extended plays, Ugly Cry (2023) and Safety Blanket (2025).

== History ==
Most members of the Tullamarines were already involved in other Adelaide bands before coming together as a four-piece in late 2021. Josh Thomas played in Mum Thinks Blue, Ben Waltho played guitar and sang in Cove Street, and Angus Purvis was in Don't Bring Stacey. Purvis and Thomas had also previously featured on Lucinda Machin's solo single Time Moves Too Fast For Me.

The band released their debut extended play (EP), Ugly Cry, in November 2023. It was self-recorded and produced alongside Michael Cutayar, before the members added more elements to the mix from their home studios.

The Tullamarines' second EP, Safety Blanket, was released in September 2025 and supported by a national tour. It was recorded with Izaac Wilson at the start of 2025.

Performing for Triple J's Like a Version, they covered Fleetwood Mac's "The Chain" in June 2026.

== Artistry ==
The Tullamarines cite San Cisco, the Jungle Giants and Ball Park Music as core musical inspirations. They call themselves "perennial over thinkers" and stress about "every millisecond of a song."

== Discography ==
List of EPs, with selected details
Title	Details
Ugly Cry	Released: 3 November 2023; Label: The Tullamarines
Safety Blanket	Released: 19 September 2025; Label: The Tullamarines / G.Y.R.O.

== Awards and nominations ==
=== AIR Awards ===
The Australian Independent Record Awards (commonly known informally as AIR Awards) is an annual awards night to recognise, promote and celebrate the success of Australia's Independent Music sector.

Year	Nominee / work	Award	Result	Ref.
2026	Safety Blanket	Best Independent Rock Album or EP	Nominated	

=== J Awards ===
The J Awards are an annual series of Australian music awards that were established by the Australian Broadcasting Corporation's youth-focused radio station Triple J. They commenced in 2005.

Year	Nominee / work	Award	Result	Ref.
2026	The Tullamarines	Unearthed Artist of the Year	Nominated	

=== South Australian Music Awards ===
The South Australian Music Awards are annual awards that exist to recognise, promote and celebrate excellence in the South Australian contemporary music industry. They commenced in 2012.

Year	Nominee / work	Award	Result (wins only)	Ref.
2026	The Tullamarines	Best New Artist	Won	
2026	Safety Blanket	Best Cover Art	Won	
