= Rowena Wise =

Australian singer songwriter

- Genres: Folk; rock
- Occupations: Singer; songwriter
- Instrument: Vocals
- Years active: 2016–present
- Label: Beloved
- Website: rowenawise.com

Rowena Wise is an Australian indie folk and rock singer and songwriter from Margaret River, Western Australia and based in Melbourne, Australia.

In August 2026, Wise released her second studio album Bad Things Feel Good*, which became her first to enter a national chart, debuting at number 44 on the ARIA Albums Chart.

== Early life ==
Wise was part of a touring family band in her youth. She moved to Melbourne at 18 to forge her own artistic path.

== Career ==
Wise released her self-titled demo album in 2016.

In May 2024, Wise released her debut studio album Senseless Acts of Beauty. The album was shortlisted for the 2024 Australian Music Prize, and producer Rob Muinos was nominated for the 2025 AIR Awards.

In August 2026, Wise released Bad Things Feel Good*.

== Discography ==
=== Studio albums ===
List of albums, with selected details
Title	Details	Peak chart positions
Title	Details	AUS
Senseless Acts of Beauty	Released: May 2024; Label: Beloved; Format: CD, LP, digital download	—
Bad Things Feel Good*	Released: 7 August 2026; Label: Beloved; Format: LP, digital download	44

=== Self released / Demo albums ===
List of Self released / Demo albums, with selected details
Title	Details
Rowena Wise	Released: 2016; Label: Rowena Wise (RW001); Format: CD, digital download

== Awards and nominations ==
=== AIR Awards ===
The Australian Independent Record Awards (commonly known informally as AIR Awards) is an annual awards night to recognise, promote and celebrate the success of Australia's Independent Music sector.

Year	Nominee / work	Award	Result	Ref.
2025	Robert Muinos for Senseless Acts of Beauty by Rowena Wise	Independent Mix, Studio or Mastering Engineer of the Year	Nominated	

=== Australian Music Prize ===
The Australian Music Prize (the AMP) is an annual award of $50,000 given to an Australian band or solo artist in recognition of the merit of an album released during the year of award. They commenced in 2005.

Year	Nominee / work	Award	Result	Ref.
2024	Senseless Acts of Beauty	Australian Music Prize	Nominated	

=== J Awards ===
The J Awards are an annual series of Australian music awards that were established by the Australian Broadcasting Corporation's youth-focused radio station Triple J. They commenced in 2005.

Year	Nominee / work	Award	Result	Ref.
2026	Rowena Wise	Double J Artist of the Year	Nominated	
