= Mulga Bore Hard Rock =

Australian indigenous rock band

- Origin: Akaye, Northern Territory, Australia
- Genres: Hard rock, glam rock
- Years active: 2022 to present
- Members: Kirklen Bird; Talvin Bird; Tryell Bird; Aiden Manfong; Alvin Manfong; Niara Tilmouth

Mulga Bore Hard Rock are an Australian indigenous hard rock band from the desert town Akaye (Mulga Bore), Northern Territory. They are a family group and opened for KISS in 2022.

== Background ==
The six-member band come from Akaye which is a remote central Australia desert community. It is in the Northern Territory, approximately two hours northeast of Alice Springs.

The group's sound is influenced by 1970s glam rock. They are also inspired by KISS and Guns N' Roses which is blended with their own original rock. The band leader is Alvin Manfong. As of April 2024, the band members ages ranged from 14 to 19. The band has played in festivals in Australia from Melbourne to Hobart and opened for Kiss and No Fixed Address.

== Career ==
They started out as a school band in 2022 Not long after that they won a Battle of the Bands competition. In September that year, the group opened for Kiss at their Gold Coast concert. According to a 25 August 2022 article by Brenton Harris for The Music, this came about as a result of filmmaker Rebecca McLean who was working on a video clip and a documentary of the band. It was discovered that Kiss was coming to Australia. She had initiated contact and some time later had a reply from the Kiss tour promoter said that they could do a half-hour supporting set. On 10 September 2022 at Cbus Super Stadium, band commenced their 30 min performance at 4:00 pm. Later the drummer for Kiss, Eric Singer told the band they rocked and Paul Stanley shared a fist-bump with Aiden Manfog, Mulga Bore Hard Rock's drummer.

By Late 2024, the group had released their debut single "Young Men". According to the National Indigenous Times, the single channelled the 1980s glam rock era, with heavy drums and polished guitar solos. A video for the song featured the group dressed in Kiss like attire, cruising in a powder-blue 1964 Cadillac Music magazine Rolling Stone had it on the Best Australian Music of the Week: November 11th-17th list.

== Members ==
- Alvin Manfong a.k.a. Thunder Child - vocals, guitar
- Kirklen Bird a.k.a. Desert Demon - bass, vocals
- Aiden Manfong a.k.a. Desert Dingo - drums
- Niara Tilmouth a.k.a. Queen of Hearts - vocals, tambourine
- Tryell Bird a.k.a. Star Boy - guitar, vocals
- Talvin Bird a.k.a. Black Diamond - bass

== Awards and nominations ==
=== J Awards ===
The J Awards are an annual series of Australian music awards that were established by the Australian Broadcasting Corporation's youth-focused radio station Triple J. They commenced in 2005.

Year	Nominee / work	Award	Result	Ref.
2026	Mulga Bore Hard Rock	Double J Artist of the Year	Nominated	
