= Swapmeet (band) =

Australian indie rock band

- From left: Jack Medlyn, Maxwell Elphick, Venus O’Broin and Joshua Doherty at Music Farmers, Wollongong, in July 2026.

Background information
- Also known as: Sour Sob (2022–2023)
- Origin: Adelaide, South Australia, Australia
- Genres: Indie rock; alt rock
- Years active: 2022–present
- Label: Winspear
- Members: Joshua Doherty; Venus O'Broin; Maxwell Elphick; Jack Medlyn
- Website: swapmeetband.com

Swapmeet is an Australian indie rock band formed in Adelaide in 2022. The group consists of guitarists and drummers Maxwell Elphick and Jack Medlyn, lead vocalist and guitarist Venus O’Broin, and bassist Joshua Doherty.

After issuing their debut extended play Oxalis in 2024, they became the first international artist signed to Los Angeles-based record label Winspear. They released their debut studio album, Mount Zero, in July 2026.

== History ==
The four band members met as teenagers in the early 2020s. Maxwell Elphick and Joshua Doherty had previously played in a jangle pop band.

The group played in the Adelaide scene under the name Sour Sob, until 2023, when they were sent a cease and desist from local musician Soursob Bob, who claimed their names were too similar. Swapmeet became their new name, a reference to Elphick buying his guitar from a swap meet.

In April 2024, the band released their debut five-track extended play (EP), Oxalis, named in reference to oxalis pes-caprae, the botanic name of a soursob. It was entirely self-recorded and mixed. At the 2024 South Australian Music Awards, Swapmeet received more nominations than any other act, with wins in the Best Song ("Ceiling Fan") and Best Release (Oxalis) categories, and nods for Best New Artist, Best Group and Best Cover Art.

Swapmeet became the first international artist signed to the Los Angeles-based record label Winspear. They played at South by Southwest in early 2026 and were named by Rolling Stone as one of the "most impressive new acts" at the festival. In July 2026, they released their debut studio album, Mount Zero, named after the mountain range halfway between Adelaide and Melbourne. It was recorded at a beach house in Noarlunga.

== Artistry ==
Early influences for the band included folk rock artists including Pinegrove, Big Thief, Stella Donnelly and Julia Jacklin. The group utilise recording software as if its another instrument, layering dozens, sometimes hundreds, of tracks in the production process.

== Discography ==
=== Studio albums ===
List of studio albums, with selected details
Title	Details	Peak chart positions
Title	Details	AUS
Mount Zero	Released: 17 July 2026; Label: RKT (WSP079lp)	26

=== Extended plays ===
List of EPs, with selected details
Title	Details	Peak chart positions
Title	Details	AUS
Oxalis	Released: 12 April 2024; Label: Winspear	—

== Awards and nominations ==
=== Australian Music Prize ===
The Australian Music Prize (the AMP) is an annual award of $50,000 given to an Australian band or solo artist in recognition of the merit of an album released during the year of award. It commenced in 2005.

Year	Nominee / work	Award	Result	Ref.
2026	Mount Zero	Australian Music Prize	Nominated	

=== J Awards ===
The J Awards are an annual series of Australian music awards that were established by the Australian Broadcasting Corporation's youth-focused radio station Triple J. They commenced in 2005.

Year	Nominee / work	Award	Result	Ref.
2026	Mount Zero	Australian Album of the Year	Nominated	
2026	Swapmeet	Unearthed Artist of the Year	Won	

=== South Australian Music Awards ===
The South Australian Music Awards are annual awards that exist to recognise, promote and celebrate excellence in the South Australian contemporary music industry. They commenced in 2012.

Year	Nominee / work	Award	Result	Ref.
2024	"Ceiling Fan"	Best Song	Won	
2024	Oxalis	Best Release	Won	
2024	Swapmeet	Best New Artist	Nominated	
2024	Swapmeet	Best Group	Nominated	
2024		Best Cover Art	Nominated	
2026	Swapmeet	Best Group	Won	
2026	Mount Zero	Best Release (EP/ Album)	Won	
2026	"I Know!"	Best Song	Won	
2026	Mayah Salter – Swapmeet ("Halfway")	Best Music Video	Nominated	
2026	Swapmeet	Best Rock	Won	
2026	Swapmeet	Best Producer	Nominated	
