= Crushing (album) =

Studio album by Julia Jacklin
- Released: 22 February 2019
- Length: 39:24
- Labels: Polyvinyl; Transgressive; Liberation
- Producer: Burke Reid

Julia Jacklin chronology
Don't Let the Kids Win (2016)	Crushing (2019)	Pre Pleasure (2022)

Singles from Crushing
- 1. "Body" Released: 3 October 2018; 2. "Head Alone" Released: 8 November 2018; 3. "Pressure to Party" Released: 24 January 2019; 4. "Comfort" Released: 14 February 2019; 5. "Don't Know How To Keep Loving You" Released: October 2019

Crushing is the second studio album by Australian singer-songwriter Julia Jacklin. It was released in February 2019 under Polyvinyl Record Co., Transgressive Records and Liberation Records.

At the ARIA Music Awards of 2019, the album was nominated for six awards; Best Female Artist, Best Adult Contemporary Album, Best Independent Release, Producer of the Year, Engineer of the Year and Best Cover Art. At the AIR Awards of 2020, the album won Best Independent Blues and Roots Album or EP.

== Critical reception ==
Professional ratings
Aggregate scores
Source	Rating
AnyDecentMusic?	8.1/10
Metacritic	85/100
Review scores
Source	Rating
AllMusic	4.5/5 stars
Chicago Tribune	3.5/4 stars
The Daily Telegraph	5/5 stars
The Independent	5/5 stars
Mojo	4/5 stars
NME	4/5 stars
The Observer	4/5 stars
Pitchfork	7.7/10
Q	4/5 stars
Rolling Stone	4/5 stars

At Metacritic, which assigns a normalised rating out of 100 to reviews from mainstream publications, the album received an average score of 85, based on 24 reviews. Helen Brown of The Independent gave the album a perfect score, calling it "Grunge-rinsed, feminist-flipped, upcycled Fifties guitar an' all: Crushing is a triumph". Neil McCormick of The Daily Telegraph praised the album, giving it a perfect score and saying, "As a body of work, Crushing feels small, intimate and inward. But these are big songs, full of big ideas, from a big talent." Jonathan Bernstein of Rolling Stone described it as a "subdued yet arresting LP that blends sweet indie-pop with folk introspection and delicate piano balladry, as Jacklin offers up concise self-realizations without fuss or fanfare." Adriane Pontecorvo of PopMatters gave the album a positive review, saying, "Life, love, heartbreak: none of it is particularly novel as musical material, but on Crushing, Julia Jacklin lets us learn from her experiences with her heart on her sleeve. There is a valuable perspective here, and truly moving music."

In a year-end essay for Slate, Ann Powers cited Crushing as one of her favorite albums from 2019 and proof that the format is not dead but rather undergoing a "metamorphosis". She added that concept albums had reemerged through the culturally-relevant autobiographical narratives of artists such as Jacklin, who "redefined the edges of intimacy within the singer-songwriter mode on Crushing, which considers how women set boundaries and constantly face the violation of them, not just in love but in every aspect of their lives".

== Track listing ==
All tracks are written by Julia Jacklin.

No.	Title	Length
1.	"Body"	5:07
2.	"Head Alone"	2:58
3.	"Pressure to Party"	3:02
4.	"Don't Know How to Keep Loving You"	5:32
5.	"When the Family Flies In"	4:00
6.	"Convention"	3:16
7.	"Good Guy"	4:11
8.	"You Were Right"	2:22
9.	"Turn Me Down"	5:49
10.	"Comfort"	3:07
Total length:		39:24

== Personnel ==
Credits adapted from liner notes.

- Julia Jacklin – vocals, guitar
- Georgia Mulligan – backing vocals (2, 5)
- Blain Cunneen – guitar
- Dominic Rizzo – piano, assistant engineer
- Clayton Allen – drums
- Harry Fuller – bass guitar
- Burke Reid – production, mixing, engineering
- Guy Davie – mastering
- Nick Mckk – photography
- Mel Baxter – layout

== Charts ==
Chart (2019)	Peak position
Australian Albums (ARIA)	8
Irish Independent Albums (IRMA)	20
Belgian Albums (Ultratop Flanders)	156
New Zealand Albums (RMNZ)	22
Scottish Albums (Official Charts)	29
UK Albums (Official Charts)	67
