= Pre Pleasure =

Studio album by Julia Jacklin
- Released: 26 August 2022
- Studios: Mixart Studios, Montreal; Planet Studios, Montreal
- Length: 37:59
- Labels: Polyvinyl; Transgressive
- Producers: Julia Jacklin; Marcus Paquin

Julia Jacklin chronology
Crushing (2019)	Pre Pleasure (2022)	The Gem (2026)

Pre Pleasure is the third studio album by Australian singer-songwriter Julia Jacklin. It was released on 26 August 2022 under Polyvinyl Record Co. and Transgressive Records. At the 2022 ARIA Music Awards, the album earned Jacklin nominations for Best Solo Artist, Best Independent Release and Best Adult Contemporary Album. The album was also nominated for several other awards, including the Australian Album of the Year at the 2022 J Awards, the Australian Music Prize, Independent Album of the Year at the AIR Awards of 2023, and Best Album at the 2023 Music Victoria Awards.

== Critical reception ==
Professional ratings
Aggregate scores
Source	Rating
Metacritic	84/100
Review scores
Source	Rating
AllMusic	4/5 stars
Clash	7/10
Exclaim!	9/10
The Independent	4/5 stars
The Line of Best Fit	7/10
Mojo	4/5 stars
The Observer	4/5 stars
Paste	8.3/10
Pitchfork	7.4/10
Uncut	9/10

Pre Pleasure received critical acclaim from music critics upon its release. At Metacritic, which assigns a normalised rating out of 100 to reviews from mainstream publications, the album received an average score of 84, based on 18 reviews, indicating "universal acclaim". Kitty Empire of The Observer gave the album four out of five stars, describing it as "a record about the impossibility of communication, and never quite solving your problems". Bella Fleming of The Line of Best Fit indicates that this is Julia's most punchy album so far, "a testament to Julia Jacklin’s ability to adapt and grow as a songwriter". Ellie Robinson of NME wrote that "the material here is some of Jacklin’s most intense, never holding back with her gut-punching ruminations on religion, sex and trauma".

== Track listing ==
All songs are written by Julia Jacklin.

1. "Lydia Wears a Cross" – 4:02
2. "Love, Try Not to Let Go" – 3:44
3. "Ignore Tenderness" – 3:09
4. "I Was Neon" – 4:03
5. "Too in Love to Die" – 3:36
6. "Less of a Stranger" – 4:32
7. "Moviegoer" – 3:47
8. "Magic" – 2:59
9. "Be Careful with Yourself" – 3:48
10. "End of a Friendship" – 4:24

== Personnel ==
- Julia Jacklin – vocals, backing vocals, electric guitar, nylon string guitar, piano
- Will Kidman – electric guitar, acoustic guitar, Hammond organ, vibraphone
- Adam Kinner – saxophone on "Moviegoer"
- Karen Ng – clarinet on "Moviegoer"
- Owen Pallett – string arrangements on "Ignore Tenderness" and "End of a Friendship"
- Marcus Paquin – synthesizer, drum machine, acoustic guitar
- Laurie Torres – drums, percussion
- Ben Whiteley – bass guitar, acoustic guitar, piano, synthesizer
- Arrangements performed by the Macedonian Symphonic Orchestra

Production

- Julia Jacklin – producer, photography
- Marcus Paquin – producer, engineer, mixer
- Karolane Carbonneau – assistant engineer
- Joao Carvalho – mastering
- Nick Mekk – cover photography
- Sebastian White – design

== Charts ==
Chart performance for Pre Pleasure
Chart (2022)	Peak position
Australian Albums (ARIA)	2
New Zealand Albums (RMNZ)	11
Irish Independent Albums (IRMA)	11
Scottish Albums (Official Charts)	11
UK Albums (Official Charts)	56
UK Independent Albums (Official Charts)	4
