= The Gem (album) =

Studio album by Julia Jacklin
- Released: 25 September 2026
- Studios: Rat Shack, Melbourne
- Genres: Indie folk; indie pop
- Length: 34:56
- Labels: 4AD; Remote Control
- Producers: Julia Jacklin; Robert Muiños

Julia Jacklin chronology
Pre Pleasure (2022)	The Gem (2026)

The Gem is the fourth studio album by the Australian singer-songwriter Julia Jacklin. It was released on 25 September 2026 under 4AD and Remote Control Records.

The album's title refers to a pub in Collingwood that Jacklin began frequenting when she moved to Melbourne, and the studio in which the album was recorded sits right above it.

At the 2026 J Awards, the album was nominated for Australian Album of the Year. The album was shortlisted for the 2026 Australian Music Prize.

== Critical reception ==
Professional ratings
Aggregate scores
Source	Rating
Album of the Year	78/100
Any Decent Music	7.7/10
Metacritic	81/100
Review scores
Source	Rating
AllMusic	3.5/5 stars
The Guardian	4/5 stars
Slant Magazine	4/5 stars

On Album of the Year, the album has an average score of 78 out of 100 from seventeen critic scores. Any Decent Music gave it a weighted average score of 7.7 out of 10 from seventeen critic scores. According to Metacritic, it received "universal acclaim" based on a weighted average score of 81 out of 100 from twelve critic scores.

Giselle Au-Nhien Nguyen of The Guardian gave the album four out of five stars, writing that it "offers a window into the contradictions and confusions of Jacklin's smart, sensitive mind". Writing for The Line of Best Fit, John Amen rated the album 7/10, commenting, "The artist’s persona (the forthright introvert?) serves as MC, but a shadowy presence (the mercurial Persephone?) lurks beneath the surface". He concluded, "If The Gem is frequently beguiling, it’s for this tamped volatility or simmering despondence, a not-so-quiet desperation bubbling in the depths".

== Track listing ==
All tracks are written by Julia Jacklin.

The Gem track listing
No.	Title	Length
1.	"Brand New"	3:14
2.	"God Sometimes"	3:41
3.	"If I Had the Hand of God"	2:41
4.	"The Hardest Thing"	3:21
5.	"Angel Vision"	3:41
6.	"Real Life"	3:28
7.	"Get Away from Me (I Think I'll Love You Soon)"	2:48
8.	"You Turned On the Tap"	2:59
9.	"Walk on Me"	6:03
10.	"I Wish" (featuring the Maes)	3:00
Total length:		34:56

== Personnel ==
Credits are adapted from the album's liner notes and Tidal.

- Julia Jacklin – voice, production (all tracks); electric guitar (tracks 3, 4, 7, 9), drum kit (8)
- Robert Muiños – production, engineering, mixing (all tracks); tambourine (1, 2, 4, 7, 9); bass guitar, voice (1); electric guitar (3, 9)
- Jordan Power – mastering
- Jacob Diamond – acoustic guitar (1, 2, 4, 6, 7, 9, 10), voice (1, 4–7), electric guitar (2–4, 7, 9), guitar (5)
- Jess Elwood – drum kit (1–4, 6, 7, 9), voice (1)
- Olaf Scott – Wurlitzer piano (1, 2, 6), synthesizer (6), piano (8)
- Mimi Gilbert – voice (2–4), bass guitar (3, 4, 7, 9)
- Richard Bradbeer – bass guitar (2), double bass (5)
- Nathaniel Poynter – flute (8)
- Elsie Rigby – voice (10)
- Maggie Rigby – voice, acoustic guitar (10)

== Charts ==
Chart performance for The Gem
Chart (2026)	Peak position
Australian Albums (ARIA)	5
Irish Independent Albums (IRMA)	43
New Zealand Albums (Recorded Music NZ)	32
Scottish Albums (Official Charts)	13
UK Albums (Official Charts)	78
UK Independent Albums (Official Charts)	7
