= Drifting Clouds (band) =

Australian indie rock band

- Origin: Bunhungura, Northern Territory, Australia
- Genres: Indie rock; alt rock
- Years active: 2025–present
- Members: Terry Guyula; Chris Ashley; Daniel Guyula; James Guyula; Marcus Guyala; Zac Terry; Alfred Wunungmurra; Alvin Wunungmurra

Drifting Clouds is an Australian indie rock from Arnhem Land in the Northern Territory. The group consists of singer/songwriter/keyboardist Terry Guyula with Chris Ashley, Daniel Guyula, James Guyula, Marcus Guyala, Zac Terry, Alfred Wunungmurra and Alvin Wunungmurra. According to Terry Guyula, the name Drifting Clouds reflects Yolŋu imagery of clouds separating during song and dance, a nod to his cultural roots.

== History ==
Terry Guyula is from Bunhungura, a 20-minute drive from Gapuwiyak in eastern Arnhem Land. He sings in the Liyawulma’mirr-Djambarrpuyŋu dialect of Yolŋu Matha language. He grew up in a musical family, with his father and uncle playing in a local fellowship band. This inspired him to take up drums and keyboards. “I was always listening to the sound of the keyboard, laying my head on the keyboard with my dad when he was playing,” he told radio station Triple J. He describes his influences as Billy Ocean’s saxophone-driven sound, the Bee Gees, and synth-pop.

He studied music in Perth, Western Australia and is currently studying screen and media at Batchelor Institute of Indigenous Tertiary Education in Batchelor, Northern Territory. He says he ultimately wants to produce his own music videos.

== Discography ==
=== Singles ===
- "Bawuypawuy" (2025)
- "Rarrandharr" (2026)

== Awards and nominations ==
=== J Awards ===
The J Awards are an annual series of Australian music awards that were established by the Australian Broadcasting Corporation's youth-focused radio station Triple J. They commenced in 2005.

Year	Nominee / work	Award	Result	Ref.
2026	"Rarrandharr" (director Matt Sav)	Australian Video of the Year	Nominated	
