= Julia Jacklin =

Australian singer-songwriter

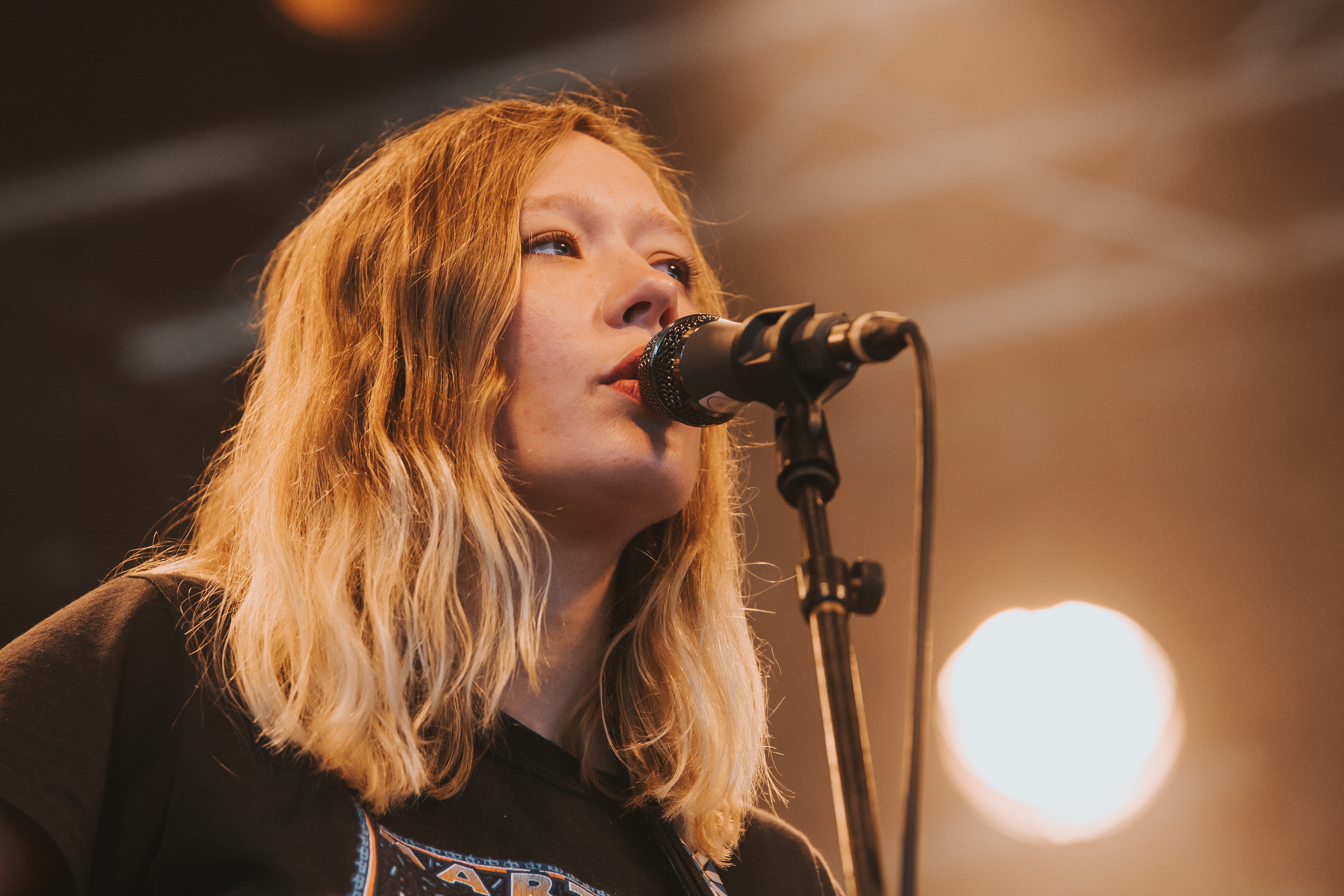
- Jacklin performing at the Roskilde Festival in 2017

Background information
- Born: 30 August 1990 (age 36); Blue Mountains, New South Wales, Australia
- Genres: Indie pop; indie folk; alternative country; indie rock
- Occupation: Singer-songwriter
- Instruments: Vocals, guitar
- Years active: 2013–present
- Labels: Transgressive; Liberation; Polyvinyl; 4AD
- Member of: Phantastic Ferniture, Binspoon
- Formerly of: Salta
- Website: http://www.juliajacklin.com/

Julia Jacklin (born 30 August 1990) is an Australian singer-songwriter from the Blue Mountains region of New South Wales. Jacklin's musical style has been described as indie pop, indie folk, and alternative country. She has released four studio albums, Don't Let the Kids Win (2016), Crushing (2019), Pre Pleasure (2022) and The Gem (2026). Jacklin has also performed with the band Phantastic Ferniture, with whom she released the debut single "Fuckin 'n' Rollin" and a self-titled album in 2018, followed by subsequent singles.

== Early life and education ==
Jacklin grew up in the Blue Mountains, Australia, in a family of school teachers. Her father is from Northampton. Inspired by Britney Spears, at the age of 10, she took classical singing lessons before joining a high school band which did Avril Lavigne and Evanescence covers. She studied social policy at Sydney University, and after graduating she lived in a garage in Glebe, a suburb of Sydney, and worked in a factory making essential oils. Growing up, Jacklin did not know anyone who was a full-time musician, and her family did not understand what it meant to be a musician: "They didn't really see it as being something that was going to work out, at all," Jacklin says in an interview with Sound of Boston.

== Career ==
Jacklin continued to perform locally, and formed the band Salta together with Liz Hughes in 2012.

=== 2014-2016: Santafel and Don't Let the Kids Win ===
In 2014, Jacklin released her debut solo EP, Santafel.

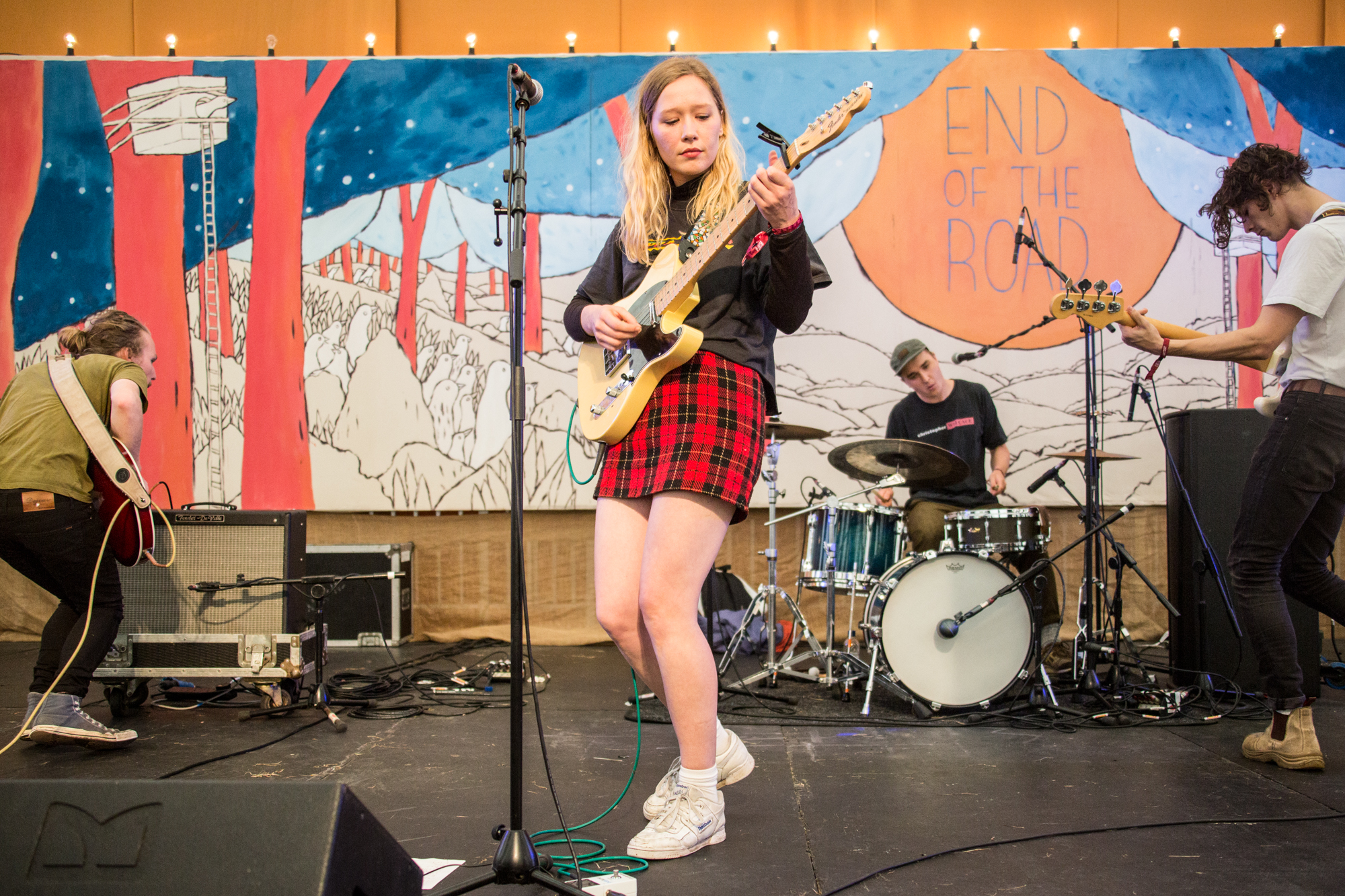
Jacklin and her band performing at End of the Road Festival in 2016

Jacklin gained an audience and significant critical acclaim through her first two singles, "Pool Party" and "Coming of Age", which both received radio airplay on BBC Radio 6 Music. She toured extensively from March 2016 in the US, UK, Europe and Australia, appearing at various festivals (most notably End of the Road Festival, Electric Picnic and South by Southwest). She has played headline gigs and has also supported artists such as First Aid Kit, Whitney, Marlon Williams and Okkervil River. In 2016, Rolling Stone Australia tipped Jacklin as one of their "Future Is Now" artists, while Triple J nominated her for a J Award for Unearthed Artist of the Year. Jacklin did not consider herself a full-time musician until August 2016, when she really started touring and figured she could not manage her regular job anymore.

Her debut studio album, Don't Let The Kids Win, was released in October 2016 on Transgressive Records. The Guardian described it as "one of those albums that will slowly creep into the affections of a large number of people" while Rolling Stone Australia found her songs "simple and unadorned". Jacklin was working at an essential oils factory to save money to record with producer Ben Edwards, having been inspired by Aldous Harding's debut album. The album was recorded and produced by Edwards in Lyttelton, New Zealand over a three-week period. It features Eddie Boyd (guitar), Tom Stephens (drums, bass), Mitchell Lloyd (bass), Joe McCallum (drums).

In early 2016, she released her single "Pool Party" independently, and became one of the stand out acts at SXSW the same year, receiving rave reviews from publications such as The New York Times, Vogue, Brooklyn Vegan and NME. Off the back of SXSW she signed with Transgressive Records, Polyvinyl Record Co. and Liberation Music and showcased at The Great Escape Festival in the UK. Following the release of the album, she went on to perform at major festivals including Glastonbury Festival, Latitude Festival, Newport Folk Festival, Splendour in the Grass and Falls Festival.

In January 2017, Julia Jacklin was named "Next Big Thing" at the FBi SMAC Awards for 2016 before she embarked on another extensive tour of Europe. She achieved various award nominations including ARIA Charts Female Artist of the Year, J Award for Album of the Year, as well as APRA Music Awards of 2017 Song of the Year for her single 'Pool Party'.

=== 2017–2020: Crushing ===
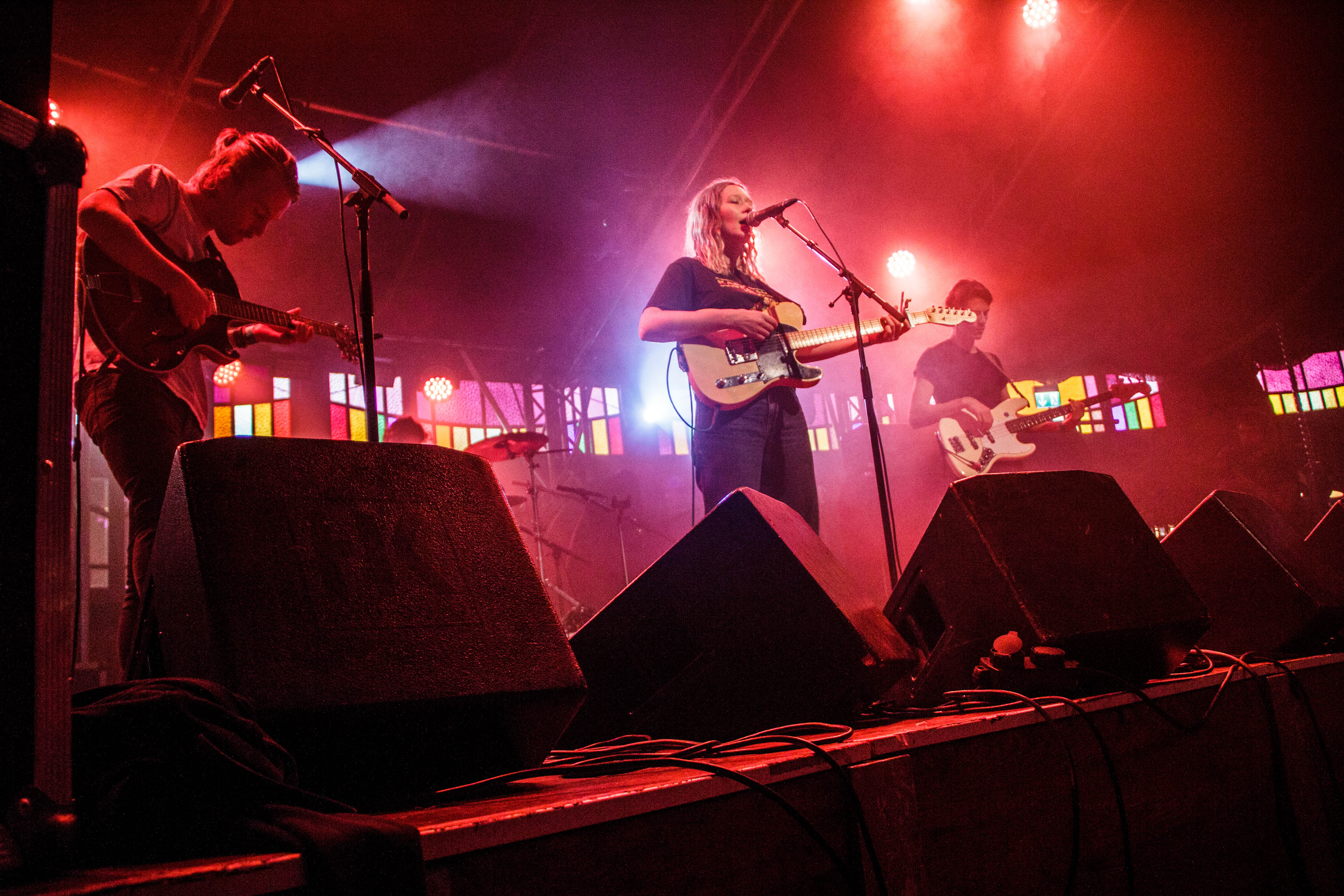
Jacklin's band at Haldern Pop in 2017

In September 2017, Julia Jacklin released a 7" single featuring two songs, once again recorded with producer Ben Edwards in Lyttelton, New Zealand. Touring in support of the single, Jacklin headlined Shepherd's Bush Empire in London on top of selling out shows in Los Angeles, New York City, Toronto, Melbourne, Sydney and cities throughout the United Kingdom.

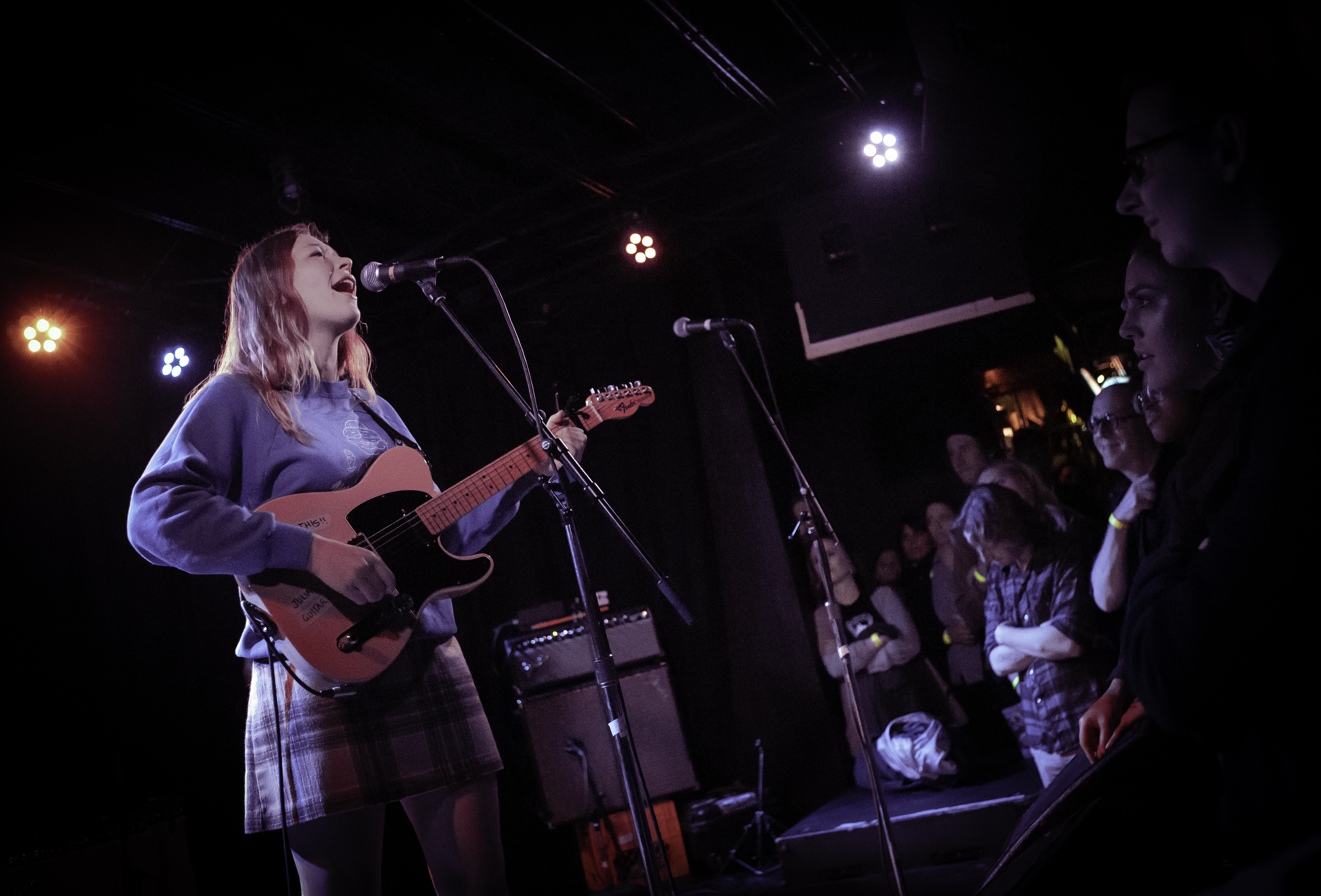
Jacklin at a 2019 concert in Minneapolis

In March 2018, Jacklin confirmed, via social media, that she had completed her second album. The album was recorded with producer Burke Reid (Courtney Barnett, The Drones) and features Blain Cunneen (guitar), Dominic Rizzo (piano), Clayton Allen (drums), Harry Fuller (bass) and Georgia Mulligan (backing vocals). Singles released prior to the album's release included "Body", "Head Alone", "Pressure To Party" and "Comfort". Crushing was released in February 2019, and was warmly received by critics with an average score of 85 on Metacritic, based on 26 reviews from mainstream publications. In light of the release of Crushing, Jacklin came at number 4 in Happy Mag's list of "The 15 Australian female artists changing the game right now".

Jacklin has stated that the song, "Head Alone" was written about personal boundaries, contrasting with the encroachment of her personal and physical space during album tours and relationships.

The tour in support of Crushing included festival dates at Shaky Knees Music Festival, Latitude Festival and Forecastle Festival, as well as sold-out headline shows for the majority of her world tour.

In October 2020 Julia Jacklin released a 7" single for the fifth volume of the Sub Pop Singles Club containing two new songs, "To Perth, Before the Border Closes" and "Cry".

=== 2022–present: Pre Pleasure and The Gem ===
On 10 May 2022, Jacklin announced her album Pre Pleasure with a 26 August release date via Polyvinyl. She accompanied the announcement with the release of her single "Lydia Wears a Cross". The album was recorded in Montreal, Quebec and was released in August 2022.

In 2025, Jacklin became the lead vocalist of a Grinspoon tribute act called Binspoon.

Jacklin announced in June 2026 she will be going on tour in North America and Europe. The tour coincides with her signing with British record label 4AD. On 15 June 2026, she released "Get Away From Me (I Think I’ll Love You Soon)" as the lead single for her album The Gem. The album released on 25 September 2026.

== Phantastic Ferniture ==
In 2014, Jacklin formed the indie garage group Phantastic Ferniture along with members Elizabeth Hughes (guitar) and Ryan K Brennan (drums).

In May 2018, the band released their debut single "Fuckin 'n' Rollin", accompanied by a music video directed by Nick McKinlay. In July 2018 the band released its self-titled album, produced by drummer Ryan K Brennan. The album featured subsequent singles "Gap Year", "Bad Timing" and "Dark Corner Dance Floor".

Following a hiatus, the band released two new tracks, "Change My Mind" and "Dare to Fall in Love", in September 2025.

== Musical and visual style ==
Allmusic described her music as a "meld of dreamy indie pop and confessional alt-country", while she cites as her influences Doris Day, The Andrews Sisters, Björk and Billy Bragg. She has also mentioned Fiona Apple and Leonard Cohen as influences.

In an interview with Sound of Boston, Jacklin notes her music video style is inspired by Swedish photographer Lars Tunbjörk, who captured the mundane and absurd moments of modern life. Jacklin has co-directing credits on all of her music videos to date. In February 2019, Stella Donnelly released a music video for her single "Tricks", which Jacklin co-directed with longtime collaborator Nick McKinlay.

In an episode of Amoeba Records' long-running What's in my Bag?, Jacklin listed her connections to Fiona Apple, Edith Piaf, Silverchair, Iris DeMent, The Drifters, Laura Jean, Goblin, Emile Mosseri, Zap Mama, Hurray For The Riff Raff, Britney Spears, Björk, and Neil Young.

== Discography ==
=== Studio albums ===
Title	Details	Peak positions		
Title	Details	AUS	NZ	UK
Don't Let the Kids Win	Released: 7 October 2016; Label: Transgressive, Polyvinyl, Liberation; Format: LP, CD, digital download	42	—	—
Crushing	Released: 22 February 2019; Label: Transgressive, Polyvinyl, Liberation	8	22	67
Pre Pleasure	Released: 26 August 2022; Label: Transgressive, Polyvinyl, Liberation	2	11	56
The Gem	Released: 25 September 2026; Label: 4AD	5	32	78

=== Extended plays ===
List of EPs, with selected details
Title	Details
Santafel	Released: December 2014; Label: Julia Jacklin

=== Singles ===
Title	Year	Peak chart positions	Album
Title	Year	US AAA	Album
"Don't Let the Kids Win"	2016	—	Don't Let the Kids Win
"Pool Party"	2016	—	Don't Let the Kids Win
"Leadlight"	2016	—	Don't Let the Kids Win
"Coming of Age"	2016	—	Don't Let the Kids Win
"Hay Plain"	2016	—	Don't Let the Kids Win
"Eastwick / Cold Caller"	2017	—	Non-album single
"Body"	2018	—	Crushing
"Head Alone"	2018	—	Crushing
"Pressure to Party"	2019	—	Crushing
"Comfort"	2019	—	Crushing
"Don't Know How to Keep Loving You"	2019	—	Crushing
"To Perth, Before the Border Closes"	2020	—	Non-album singles
"Baby Jesus Is Nobody's Baby Now"	2020	—	Non-album singles
"Army of Me" (with RVG)	2021	—	Non-album singles
"Lydia Wears a Cross"	2022	—	Pre Pleasure
"I Was Neon"	2022	—	Pre Pleasure
"Love, Try Not to Let Go"	2022	—	Pre Pleasure
"Be Careful With Yourself"	2022	—	Pre Pleasure
"Shivers"	2023	—	Non-album singles
"Good Guy" (featuring Faye Webster)	2024	—	Non-album singles
"Get Away From Me (I Think I'll Love You Soon)"	2026	27	The Gem
"I Wish"	2026	—	The Gem
"The Hardest Thing"	2026	—	The Gem

== Awards and nominations ==
=== AIR Awards ===
The Australian Independent Record Awards (commonly known informally as AIR Awards) is an annual awards night to recognise, promote and celebrate the success of Australia's Independent Music sector.

Year	Nominee / work	Award	Result	Ref.
2017	Herself	Breakthrough Independent Artist	Nominated	
2017	Don't Let the Kids Win	Best Independent Blues and Roots Album	Won	
2019	Herself	Best Independent Artist	Nominated	
2020	Crushing	Best Independent Album	Nominated	
2020	Crushing	Best Independent Blues and Roots Album	Won	
2020	"Don't Know How to Keep Loving You"	Independent Song of the Year	Nominated	
2023	Pre Pleasure	Independent Album of the Year	Nominated	
2023	"I Was Neon"	Independent Song of the Year	Nominated	

=== APRA Awards ===
The APRA Awards are presented annually from 1982 by the Australasian Performing Right Association (APRA), "honouring composers and songwriters".

Year	Nominee / work	Award	Result	Ref.
2017	"Pool Party" by Julia Jacklin	Song of the Year	Nominated	
2020	"Pressure to Party" by Julia Jacklin	Song of the Year	Shortlisted	
2023	"Lydia Wears a Cross"	Song of the Year	Nominated	

=== ARIA Music Awards ===
The ARIA Music Awards is an annual awards ceremony that recognises excellence, innovation, and achievement across all genres of Australian music. Jacklin have been nominated for eight awards.

Year	Nominee / work	Award	Result	Ref.
2017	Don't Let the Kids Win	Best Female Artist	Nominated	
2017	Nick McKinlay for Don't Let the Kids Win	Best Cover Art	Nominated	
2019	Crushing	Best Female Artist	Nominated	
2019	Crushing	Best Independent Release	Nominated	
2019	Crushing	Best Adult Contemporary Album	Nominated	
2019	Nick McKK for Crushing	Best Cover Art	Nominated	
2019	Burke Reid for Crushing	Engineer of the Year	Nominated	
2019	Burke Reid for Crushing	Producer of the Year	Nominated	
2022	Pre Pleasure	Best Solo Artist	Nominated	
2022	Pre Pleasure	Best Independent Release	Nominated	
2022	Pre Pleasure	Best Adult Contemporary Album	Won	
2022	"Lydia Wears a Cross" by Julia Jacklin	Best Video	Nominated	
2023	Pre Pleasure Tour	Best Australian Live Act	Nominated	

=== Australian Music Prize ===
The Australian Music Prize (the AMP) is an annual award of $30,000/$50,000 given to an Australian band or solo artist in recognition of the merit of an album released during the year of award. It exists to discover, reward and promote new Australian music of excellence.

Year	Nominee / work	Award	Result	Ref.
2019	Crushing	Australian Music Prize	Nominated	
2022	Pre Pleasure	Australian Music Prize	Nominated	
2026	The Gem	Australian Music Prize	Nominated	

=== J Awards ===
The J Awards are an annual series of Australian music awards that were established by the Australian Broadcasting Corporation's youth-focused radio station Triple J.

Year	Nominee / work	Award	Result	Ref.
2016	Themselves	Unearthed Artist of the Year	Nominated	
2016	Don't Let the Kids Win	Australian Album of the Year	Nominated	
2019	Themselves	Double J Artist of the Year	Nominated	
2022	Pre Pleasure	Australian Album of the Year	Nominated	
2023	Julia Jacklin	Australian Live Act of the Year	Nominated	
2026	"The Hardest Thing" (directed by Danny Cohen)	Australian Video of the Year	Nominated	
2026	The Gem	Australian Album of the Year	Nominated	

=== Music Victoria Awards ===
The Music Victoria Awards are an annual awards night celebrating Victorian music. They commenced in 2006.

Year	Nominee / work	Award	Result	Ref.
2022	"Lydia Wears a Cross"	Best Victorian Song	Nominated	
2022	Julia Jacklin	Best Solo Artist	Won	
2023	Pre Pleasure	Best Album	Nominated	
2023	"Love, Try Not to Let Go"	Best Song	Won	

=== National Live Music Awards ===
The National Live Music Awards (NLMAs) are a broad recognition of Australia's diverse live industry, celebrating the success of the Australian live scene. The awards commenced in 2016.

Year	Nominee / work	Award	Result	Ref.
2016	Herself	The Heatseeker Award (Best New Act)	Nominated	
2017	Herself	Live Voice of the Year	Nominated	
2017	Herself	Live Country or Folk Act of the Year	Nominated	
2017	Herself	International Live Achievement (Solo)	Nominated	
2017	Herself	Best Live Voice of the Year (People's Choice)	Nominated	
2017	Herself	NSW Live Voice of the Year	Won	
2018	Herself	NSW Live Voice of the Year	Won	
2019	Herself	Live Voice of the Year	Nominated	
2019	Herself	International Live Achievement (Solo)	Nominated	
2023	Julia Jacklin	Live Voice in Victoria	Won	

=== Rolling Stone Australia Awards ===
The Rolling Stone Australia Awards are awarded annually in January or February by the Australian edition of Rolling Stone magazine for outstanding contributions to popular culture in the previous year.

Year	Nominee / work	Award	Result	Ref.
2023	Pre Pleasure	Best Record	Nominated	
