= Mount Zero (Mura Mura) =

Mountain in Victoria, Australia

- Location within Victoria

Highest point
- Elevation: 364 metres (1,194 ft) AHD
- Coordinates: 36°53′06″S 142°22′08″E

Geography
- Location: Victoria, Australia
- Parent range: Grampians
- Topo map: Geoscience Australia Mount Zero

Climbing
- First ascent: Sir Thomas Mitchell (Scottish explorer and surveyor)

Mount Zero, also known as Mura Mura in the Jardwadjali language, is the northernmost mountain of the Grampian range. Its prominent conical shape is visible from the Western Highway south of Horsham. Scottish explorer Sir Thomas Livingstone Mitchell named and then described the mountain as "Mount Zero, a name I applied to a remarkable cone at the western extremity of the chain of mountains." While the peak is inside the National Park, the Mount Zero Olive Farm runs along its northern approaches. Scrub covers the sandstone slopes, with a track running up to the summit from the Mt Zero Picnic Area.

Mount Zero is the terminus of the 164 km Grampians Peaks Trail, which starts at Dunkeld. The trail began construction in 2015, and was finished in 2021.

== In popular culture ==
The debut studio album of Adelaide indie rock band Swapmeet, Mount Zero, is named after the mountain. As the mountain is halfway between Melbourne and Adelaide, the band's members would see its name on road signs, and it "became a symbol of in-betweenness and disconnection".

== See also ==
- List of mountains in Australia § Victoria
